= Polytechnic University of the Philippines Quezon City =

Public university in Quezon City, Philippines

- Politeknikong Unibersidad ng Pilipinas Lungsod Quezon (Filipino)
- Other names: PUP Commonwealth Campus; PUP Quezon City Branch
- Motto: Tanglaw ng Bayan
- Motto in English: Light of the Nation
- Type: State University
- Established: July 29, 1997; 29 years ago
- Accreditation: Accrediting Agency of Chartered Colleges and Universities in the Philippines
- Academic affiliations: Association of Southeast Asian Institutions of Higher Learning; International Association of Universities; Philippine Association of State Universities and Colleges
- President: Manuel Muhi
- Director: Edgardo S. Delmo
- Location: Quezon City, Philippines; 14°41′59″N 121°4′55″E
- Campus: Urban
- Language: Tagalog, English
- Newspaper: Vox Nova
- Colors: Maroon and gold
- Nickname: Mighty Maroons
- Sporting affiliations: State Colleges and Universities Athletic Association; National Athletic Association of Schools, Colleges and Universities
- Mascot: Pylon
- Website: www.pup.edu.ph/quezoncity
- Location in Metro Manila Location in Luzon Location in Philippines

Polytechnic University of the Philippines Quezon City (abbreviated as PUPQC; also known as PUP Commonwealth Campus) is one of the satellite campuses of the Polytechnic University of the Philippines located in Commonwealth, Quezon City, Philippines. It was established in 1997. It confers undergraduate and diploma degrees.

== History ==
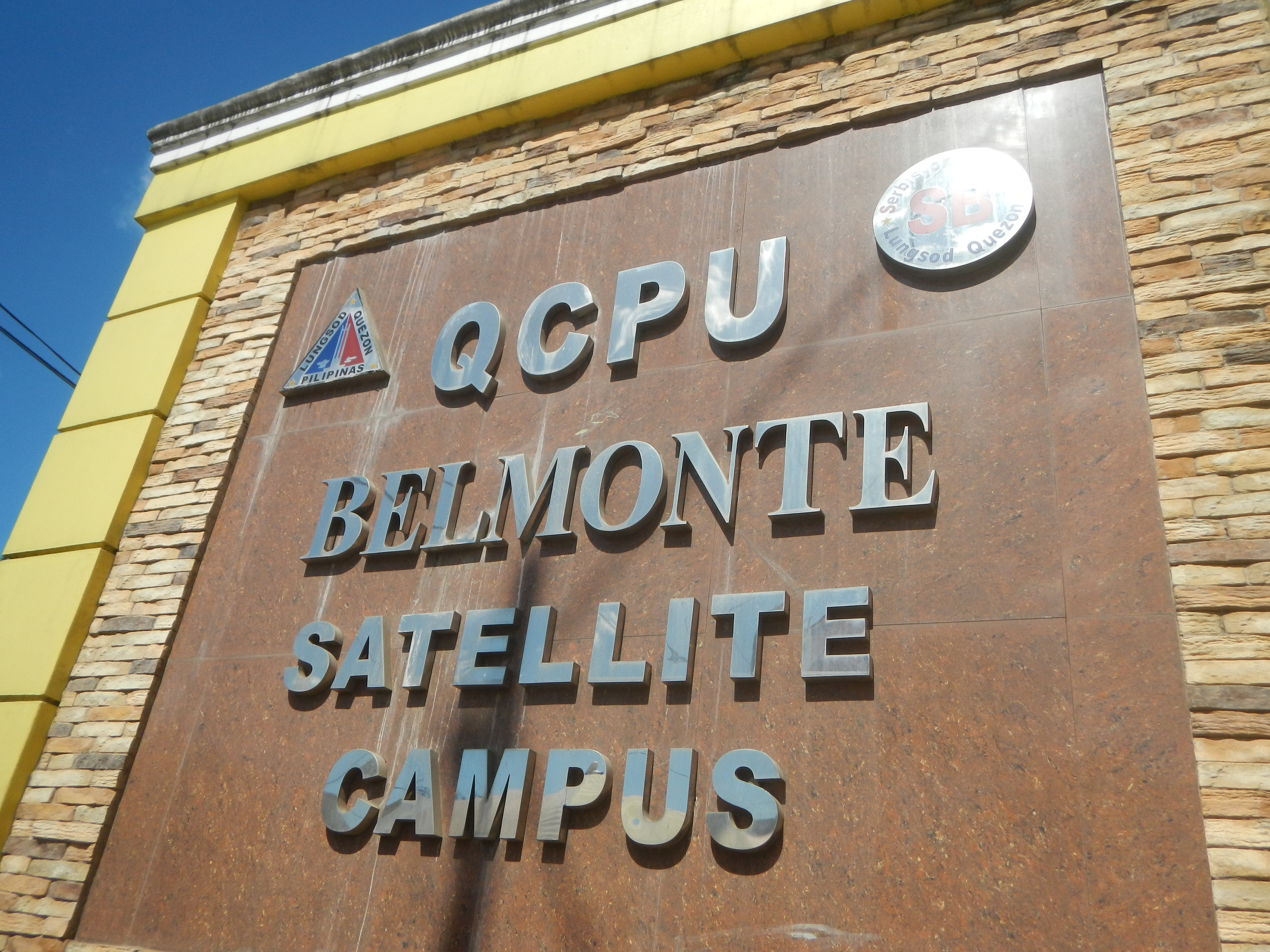
Batasan Hills Campus

PUPQC was established through the generosity and benevolence of Walter Rothlehner, a German church leader who donated his property in Barangay Commonwealth, Quezon City to PUP. The campus lot with an area of 1.9 hectares is donated by SIKHAY, an association led by Rev. Fr. Joel Tabora. The PUP Open University was tasked to administer and maintain the campus and its facilities.

PUPQC was formally inaugurated on July 29, 1997. Although it was in existing prior to 1997, it only started its operations and formal classes after its inauguration.
