= Polytechnic University of the Philippines College of Computer and Information Sciences =

College department

- Former names: College of Computer Management and Information Technology (CCMIT)
- Type: State Institution
- Established: 1986
- Chairperson: Montaigne G. Molejon MSIT(Department of Computer Science); John Dustin Santos MSIT (Department of Information Technology)
- President: Dr. Manuel Muhi
- Vice-president: Emanuel de Guzman
- Dean: Melvin C. Roxas MSGITS
- Location: N207 second Flr., North Wing, PUP Main Building, Santa Mesa, Manila, Philippines
- Campus: Urban
- Website: www.pup.edu.ph/CCIS

The Polytechnic University of the Philippines College of Computer and Information Science formerly known as College of Computer Management and Information Technology (abbreviated as PUP CCIS and commonly known as CCIS) is an academic division of the Polytechnic University of the Philippines that specializes in computer science and information technology. It grants the Bachelor of Science (BS) degree in Computer Science, Information Technology, and Information Science. It also offers and a post-baccalaureate program in computer technology.

The college was established in 1986 and has the highest grade standard required on admission. Its Information Technology program was recognized as a Center for Development by the Commission on Higher Education and as a Virtual Center for Technology Innovation in Information Technology by the Department of Science and Technology.

== History ==
In 1969, the Faculty of Accountancy of the Philippine College of Commerce offered short term electronic data processing (EDP) courses. The EDP courses were eventually transferred to the newly created Electronic Data Processing/Computer Data Processing Management (EDP/CDPM) unit and was placed under the administration of the Faculty of Business and Cooperatives in 1977 and was headed by Professor Ofelia M. Carague. The EDP/CDPM unit began offering its first four-year baccalaureate course in 1979, namely the Bachelor in Computer Data Processing Management (BCDPM).

In December 1986, by virtue of a memorandum signed by the then University President Nemesio E. Prudente, the EDP/CDPM unit was transformed into its own college and was known as the College of Computer Management and Information Technology (CCMIT) with Dr. Ofelia M. Carague as its first dean. From CCMIT, it was renamed as the College of Computer and Information Science (CCIS) in 2012. To date, it is one of the most prestigious courses offered by the university and has since produced large numbers of successful graduates.

== Academic Programs ==
=== Undergraduate ===
==== BS in Information Technology ====
Bachelor of Science in Information Technology, a four-year bachelor's degree that concentrates on the evaluation of computer use and software for information technology infrastructure planning, installation, customization, operation, management, administration, and maintenance. It also includes the development of computer-based information systems for practical business solutions.

==== BS in Computer Science ====
Bachelor of Science in Computer Science a four-year bachelor's degree that focuses on the study of ideas and theories, the foundations of algorithms, and the implementation and usage of information and computing solutions.

===== Requirements =====
- Must have attained a high school general average not lower than 88%.
- Must have a grade not lower than 85% for English, Math, and Science subjects taken in high school.
- Passed the PUP College Entrance Test with a raw score not lower than 110 points (subject to changes depending on current University set qualification mark for PUPCET
- Passed the college screening.

=== Graduate ===
The graduate school of Polytechnic University of the Philippines solely offers as of the moment is the Master of Science in Information Technology. MSIT program employs a strategy that brings together important concepts from decision science, systems management, and information technology. Students get a solid grasp of and understanding for the power of information and the systems designed to supply and manage that information through this integrated approach.

== Organizations ==
The College of Computer and Information Sciences have the official student government (CCIS -Student Council) that represents in the Polytechnic University of the Philippines Student Council (SKM), there are several organizations on both department of Computer science and Information technology.

=== Department of Computer Science (DCS) ===
==== PUP ASCII ( Association of Students in Computer Intelligence Integration) ====
Is the official Student organization under the Department of Computer Science in Polytechnic University of the Philippines main campus and other campuses.

=== Department of Information Technology (DIT) ===
==== PUP IBITS (Institute of Bachelors in Information Technology Studies) ====
The official student organization under the course of Bachelor of Science in Information Technology in Polytechnic University of the Philippines main campus and other campuses.
