= Polytechnic University of the Philippines =

Public university in Manila, Philippines

- Politeknikong Unibersidad ng Pilipinas (Filipino)
- Former names: Manila Business School (1904–1908); Philippine School of Commerce (1908–1952); Philippine College of Commerce (1952–1978)
- Motto: Filipino: Tanglaw ng Bayan
- Motto in English: Light of the Nation
- Type: Public coeducational research higher education institution
- Established: October 19, 1904 (121 years and 350 days)
- Academic affiliations: Association of Southeast Asian Institutions of Higher Learning; Accrediting Agency of Chartered Colleges and Universities in the Philippines; International Association of Universities; Philippine Association of State Universities and Colleges; ASEAN University Network
- Budget: ₱2.435 billion (2023)
- Chairman: Ronald L. Adamat (Board of Regents)
- President: Manuel M. Muhi
- Academic staff: 1,202
- Students: 83,328 (As of 2023)
- Location: Santa Mesa, Manila, Philippines; 14°35′50″N 121°0′39″E
- Campus: Main Campus Santa Mesa, Manila Campus (including NDC and MH Del Pilar) Satellite Campuses; San Juan Campus; Parañaque Campus; Taguig Campus; Quezon City Campus; Caloocan Campus; Mariveles, Bataan Campus; Pulilan, Bulacan Campus; Sta. Maria, Bulacan Campus; Pandi, Bulacan (OUS-Extension Program); Cabiao, Nueva Ecija Campus; Maragondon, Cavite Campus; Alfonso, Cavite Campus; Biñan, Laguna Campus; Calauan, Laguna Campus; San Pedro, Laguna Campus; Sta. Rosa, Laguna Campus; Pakil, Laguna (Sto. Tomas Extension); Sto. Tomas, Batangas Campus; Talisay, Batangas Campus; Mulanay, Quezon Campus; General Luna, Quezon (Mulanay Annex); Lopez, Quezon Campus; Unisan, Quezon Campus; Leyte, Leyte Campus; Bansud, Oriental Mindoro Campus; Sablayan, Occidental Mindoro Campus; Ragay, Camarines Sur Campus
- Medium of instruction: Filipino, English
- Hymn: Imno ng PUP (PUP Hymn)
- Colors: Maroon Gold
- Nickname: PUP Radicals
- Sporting affiliations: State Colleges and Universities Athletic Association; National Capital Region Athletic Association
- Mascot: Pylon
- Website: www.pup.edu.ph

- Location in Manila Location in Metro Manila Location in Luzon Location in the Philippines

The Polytechnic University of the Philippines (PUP; Filipino: Politeknikong Unibersidad ng Pilipinas) is a public research university in the Philippines with a main campus in Santa Mesa, Manila. It was founded on 19 October 1904, as the Manila Business School (MBS) and as part of Manila's public school system. It was eventually promoted to a chartered state university in 1978, by virtue of Presidential Decree 1341. PUP has more than 20 campuses (2 newly approved campuses in NCR and Visayas) across Central Luzon, Southern Luzon and Metro Manila. With over 80,000 enrolled students in all campuses, PUP claims to be the largest state university in the Philippines by student population.

The Universal Access to Quality Tertiary Education Act of 2017 mandates free tuition and fees for all students of state universities and colleges. Before the act was enforced, tuition was exactly ₱12 (roughly 24 US cents) per unit (since 1979) for undergraduate students. Students may opt out of the subsidy and choose to pay the full tuition instead. PUP has a reputation for student activism against tuition fee hikes.

== History ==
PUP traces its roots from the Manila Business School, which was founded by the Civil Government of the Philippines and was established on October 19, 1904. It is also referred to as the Manila School of Commerce. The school was delegated to create businessmen and businesswomen for government service and private employment. It was a part of the city school system of Manila which was under the superintendence of Gabriel A. O'Reilly. It held its first classes at a small two-storey building in No. 38 Gunao Street corner Arlegui in Quiapo.

The influx of students from different provinces elevated the school's status as an insular (or national) school, and it was renamed as the Philippine School of Commerce in 1908. The school moved out of its Arlegui building and continued its operation at Goldenberg Mansion located on Gen. Solano Street in San Miguel which was formerly occupied by the Bureau of Audits and the Philippine Senate. Its faculty was composed of Filipino and American teachers. For administrative purposes, the school was placed under the administration of the Superintendent of City Schools but kept its status as a national school.

In 1933, the school was merged with the Philippine Normal School and the Philippine School of Arts and Trades. During the merger that lasted 12 years, PSC was administered by the PNS Superintendent and its students who completed their courses were considered graduates of Philippine Normal School. The existence of the Philippine School of Commerce caught the attention of President Manuel L. Quezon. In his graduation address on March 26, 1940, at the Rizal Memorial Stadium, he promised a new building for the school where its graduates could be recognized. Two years later, Congressman Manuel A. Alazarte together with the Department Head of the Philippine School of Commerce Luis F. Reyes, formulated a bill to this effect and presented it to Congress. Unfortunately, the plan was not carried out because of the Japanese occupation of the Philippines that occurred between 1942 and 1945 during World War II.

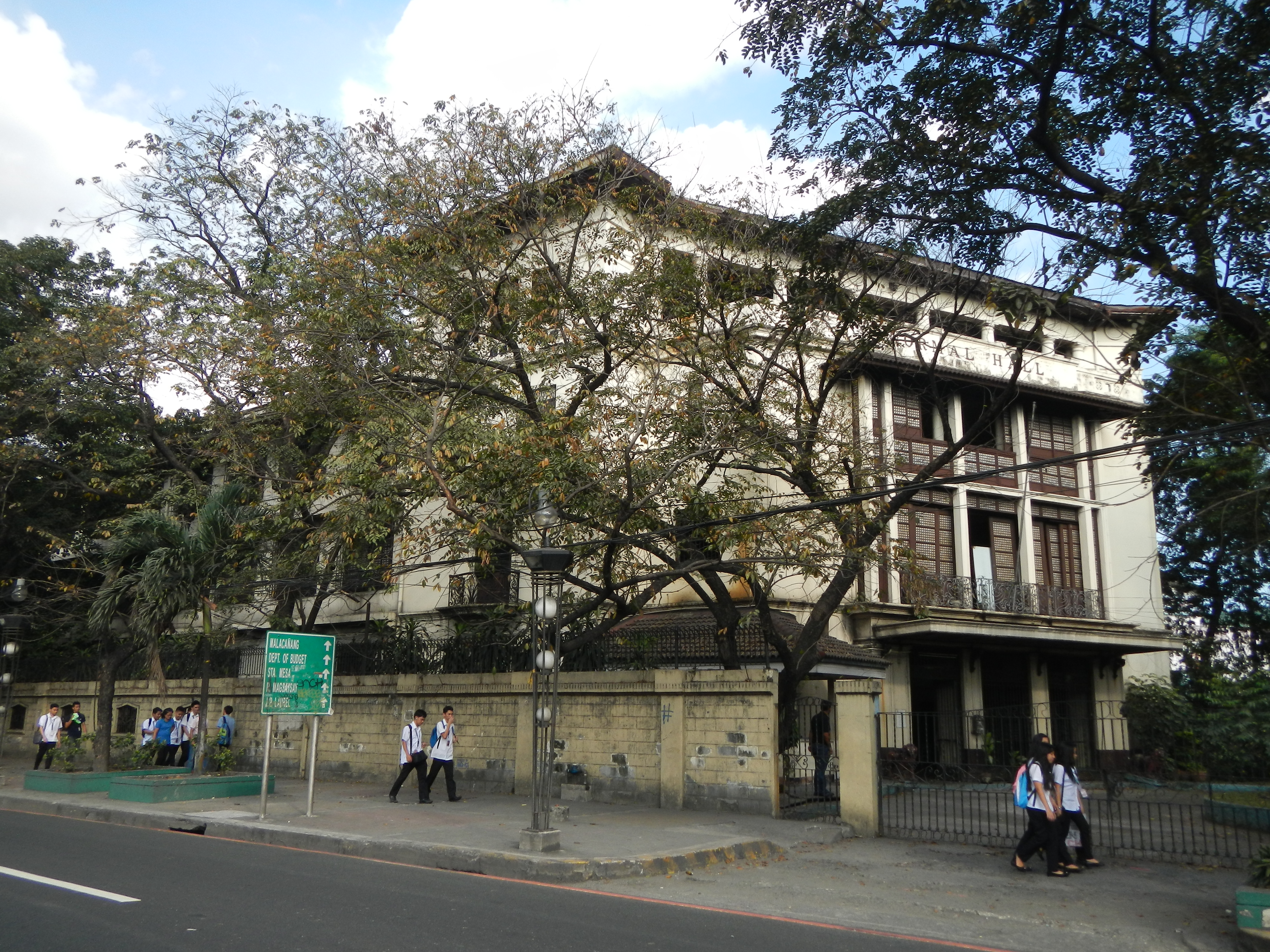
Without its own building, PSC held its classes at the Normal Hall of Philippine Normal University from 1946 to 1947.

Shortly after Philippine liberation, Superintendent Luis F. Reyes resumed the task of re-establishing and rehabilitating the school. The Bureau of Public Works released more than ₱8,000 for the repairs and maintenance of public buildings of which the school is a beneficiary. The ruins of Normal Hall were reconstructed and the college resumed its classes there on August 4, 1946. In 1947, the Philippine Normal School converted the Normal Hall into a dormitory, resulting in the Philippine School of Commerce to relocate to its former lot, where it held classes with overcrowded rooms. Because of its unbearable condition, the school made representations in the Philippine Alien Property Administrator, through Malacañang and the Department of Foreign Affairs, for the acquisition of the Lepanto site in Sampaloc. By August 4, 1947, the school had transferred to its new Lepanto campus, and Luis F. Reyes was appointed as its superintendent.

The Philippine School of Commerce was elevated into a college and was renamed as the Philippine College of Commerce in 1952 by virtue of Republic Act 778. Superintendent Luis F. Reyes became the President of the college. It broadened its course offerings and the Annex Building, which had formerly housed the Congress of the Philippines, was turned over to the college. The Business Writers Association of the Philippines awarded the college the title of "Business College of the Year" in 1955.

In 1962, Dr. Nemesio E. Prudente was appointed president. He implemented numerous initiatives that greatly benefit the students such as student loans and the inclusion of the student council in the policy-making body of the college. Three years later, President Diosdado Macapagal proclaimed that the Pandacan site of the Bureau of Animal Industry (which is a slaughterhouse) to be reserved for the exclusive use of the college. In 1968, the college offered social science courses related to business education. Also, the college was granted the right to use and dispose the A. Mabini Campus in Santa Mesa, Manila. It later adjoins the former site of National Development Corporation, which will eventually become the main and flagship campus of the institution. It was also awarded the title lot for its S.H. Loyola (Lepanto) Campus as a hotbed of student activism, where a handful of its students participated in the First Quarter Storm, one of the factors leading up to the declaration of Martial Law in 1972.

The college moved out of its Lepanto campus and completed its transfer to the A. Mabini Campus in 1971. Through Presidential Decree 1341 that was proclaimed on April 1, 1978, the Philippine College of Commerce became a chartered state university and was accordingly renamed as the Polytechnic University of the Philippines. It strengthened PUP Manila campus' designation as the main and flagship campus because it hosts the offices of PUP's Executive Officials.

In 1979, the construction of the Main Library, the University Canteen (Sampaguita Building), the Interfaith Chapel, and the addition of the third-fifth floors of the Main Academic Building was completed (although the fifth floor finished its construction in 1984). The Institute of Technology was also created, which was later known as the College of Engineering and Architecture. Because of the addition of more technical, undergrad and postgraduate programs, PUP adopted the "cluster colleges" setup in 1984, where each college prepared the program and supervised all the subjects required in the degree program offered in the college.

In 1986, Dr. Nemesio E. Prudente re-assumed the presidency of PUP. Under his presidency, PUP developed its physical facilities in Manila and on other campuses. He also formulated a new PUP logo, hymn and philosophy and had the university's organization restructured. PUP experienced enhancements in its academic and co-curricular programs, an upsurge in cultural activities, and a dynamic physical education and sports program during his term. Because of what Prudente did, he was credited with revitalizing public education in the Philippines by institutionalizing much-needed changes in the state university he led, which will eventually become the largest state university.

In the 1990s, PUP had its first female president appointed, Dr. Zenaida A. Olonan. PUP established its Information and Technology Center (ICTC) in 1999. It started its operations a year later in 2000. By February 2000, PUP was conferred by the Commission on Higher Education as a Center of Development for Excellence (CODE) in Information Technology. PUP was also recognized as a Virtual Center for Technology Innovation in Information Technology by the Department of Science and Technology (Philippines).

PUP celebrated its Centennial Year in 2004. The countdown for the Centennial started in 1999. In 2003, President Gloria Macapagal Arroyo proclaimed 2004 as the "PUP Centennial Year". She also declared that the PUP Mabini Campus would be the official and permanent home of the Mabini Shrine. The Shrine was transferred to PUP to protect it from the flood control project of the Metropolitan Manila Development Authority. As a part of its Centennial Year, plans were drawn to construct the Diosdado P. Magapagal Law Center (College of Law Building) in the Lepanto Campus and Freedom Plaza. Only the Plaza was constructed and the lot at Lepanto Campus where the Law Center is supposed to stand remains empty. PUP made the world's largest human rainbow during its centennial celebration held in Rizal Park to highlight the signing of the Declaration of Peace to be put before the United Nations. PUP's largest human rainbow is made of 30,365 students, faculty, staff and alumni.

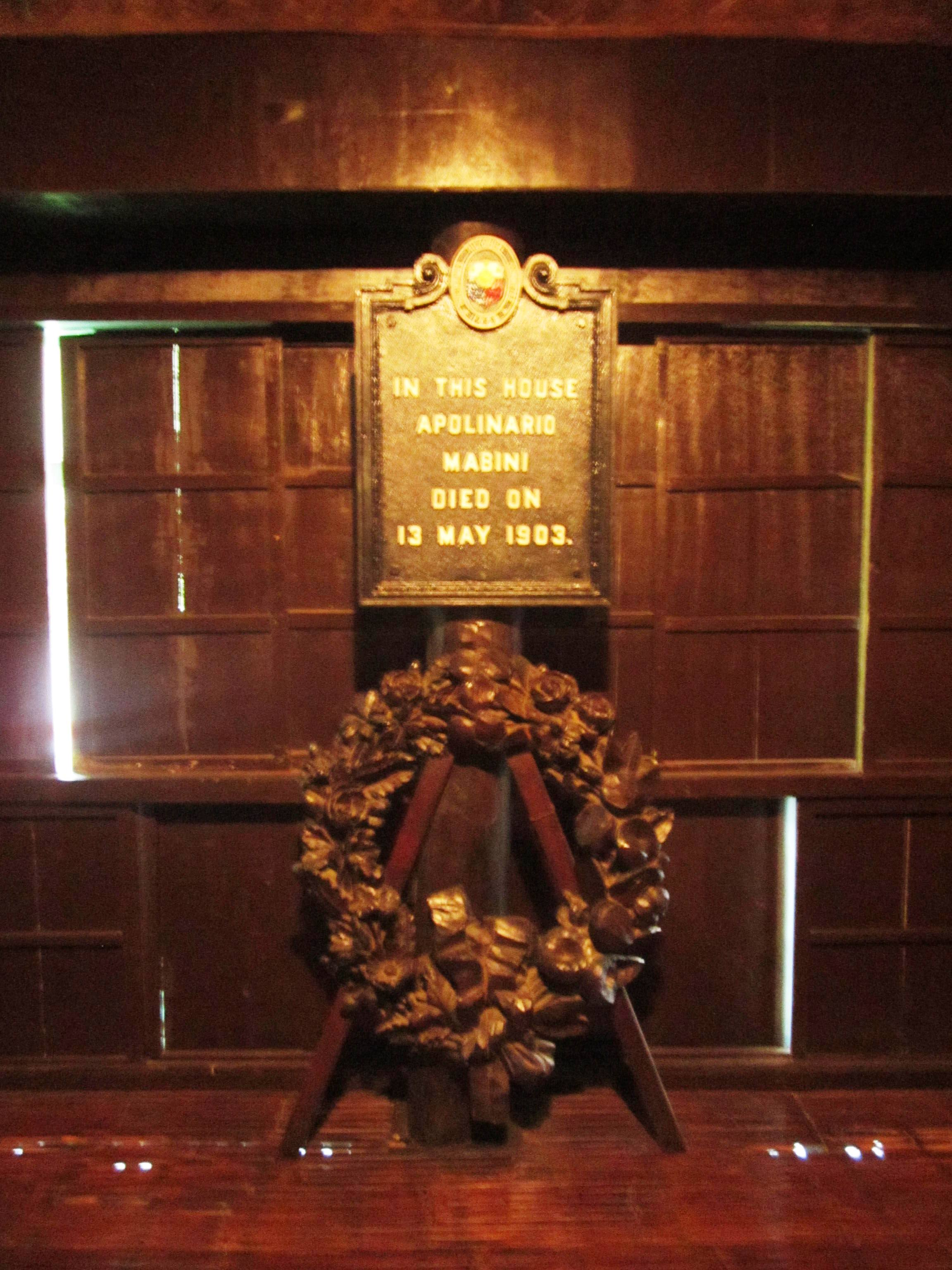
The marker of Mabini's death inside the antesala room where he died. The Mabini Shrine was relocated to the PUP main campus in 2010.

In 2005, Dr. Dante G. Guevarra was appointed as the officer-in-charge of PUP. A year later, he became acting president. Notable achievements during his term include the creation of the web-based application system PUP iApply, the designation of PUP as Southeast Asia's first railway academy in 2007, and PUP becoming as one of the sites for the entire nation's commemoration of the 110th Anniversary of the Proclamation of the Philippine Independence. Among the notable structures built during this time include the Mabini Obelisk, Freedom Plaza, and the Fort Santiago replica walls of the Luntiang Pilipinas Forest Park. Despite these achievements, however, Dr. Guevarra's tenure was also controversial due to allegations of graft and corruption, which was linked to the assassination of the vice president for administration during his term, Augustus Cezar. Because of his unsatisfactory performance after the recent events, he was suspended from his duty as the president of PUP along with other university officials that are believed to be involved in the aforementioned the scandals. In February 2020, Dr. Manuel M. Muhi was appointed as the new President of PUP.

PUP participated in a successful attempt to set a world record for most organ donation pledges in 2014, a project spearheaded by the Department of Health. It broke the record for most organ donation pledges in one hour. 3,548 people signed up in the span of 30 minutes, beating India's 2,755 pledged organ donors. PUP placed third in the "Go Green in the City" contest held at Paris, France in June 2015, representing the Philippines. Engineering students John Paul Santos and Christian Santa Romana won the award for their invention, the ELECTRIFILTER (Electricity Generation from Filthy Water). It generates electricity from waste water, has the capability to filter and cleanse water and is portable so that it can be delivered to places where clean water and electricity are in short supply.

In September 2019, multiple bills were filed in the House of Representatives and the Senate to elevate the status of PUP into national polytechnic university. The consolidated bill was vetoed by President Rodrigo Duterte in 2019, while another bill was vetoed by President Bongbong Marcos in 2025.

== PUP Sta. Mesa, Manila ==
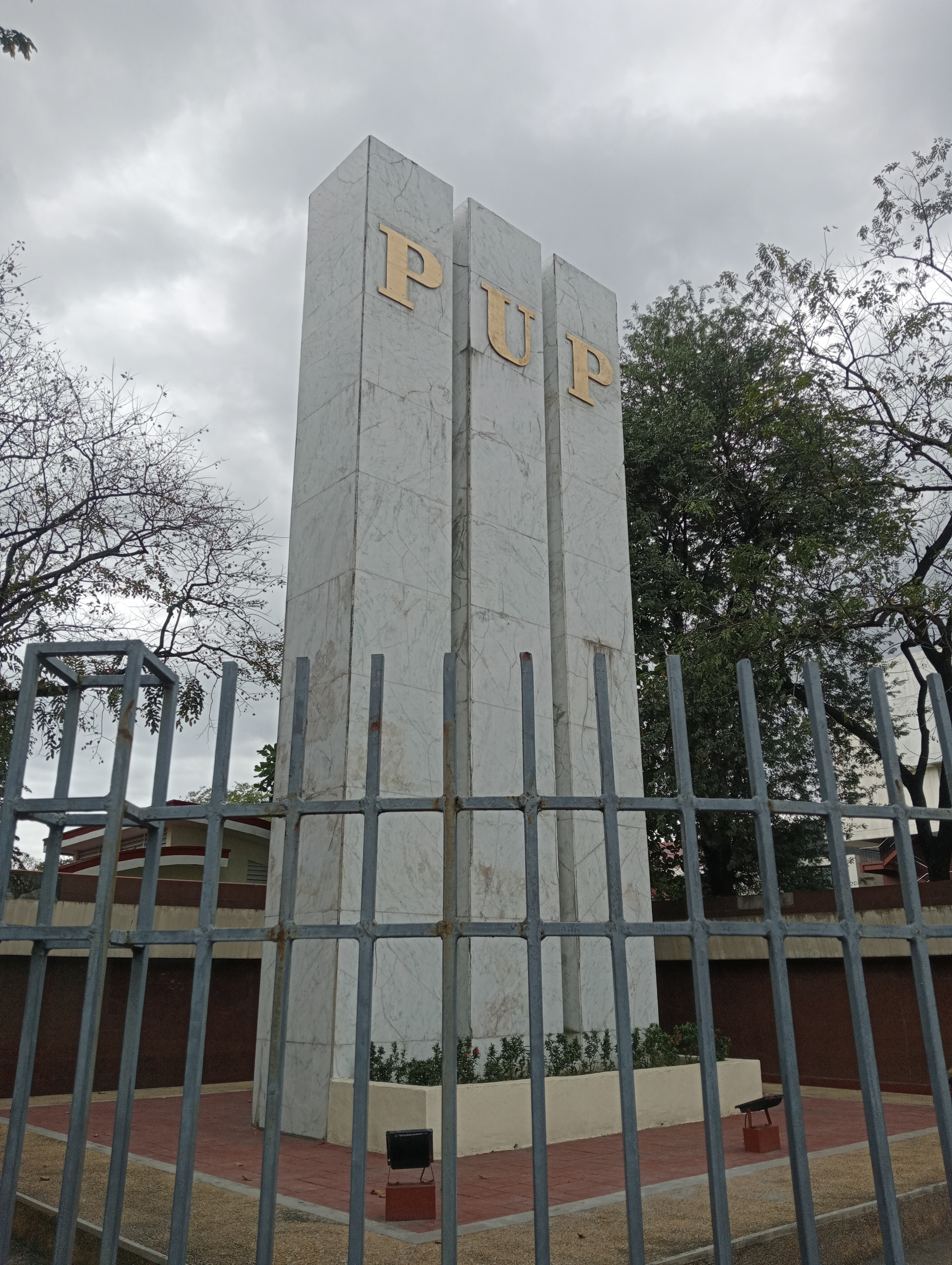
PUP Pylon

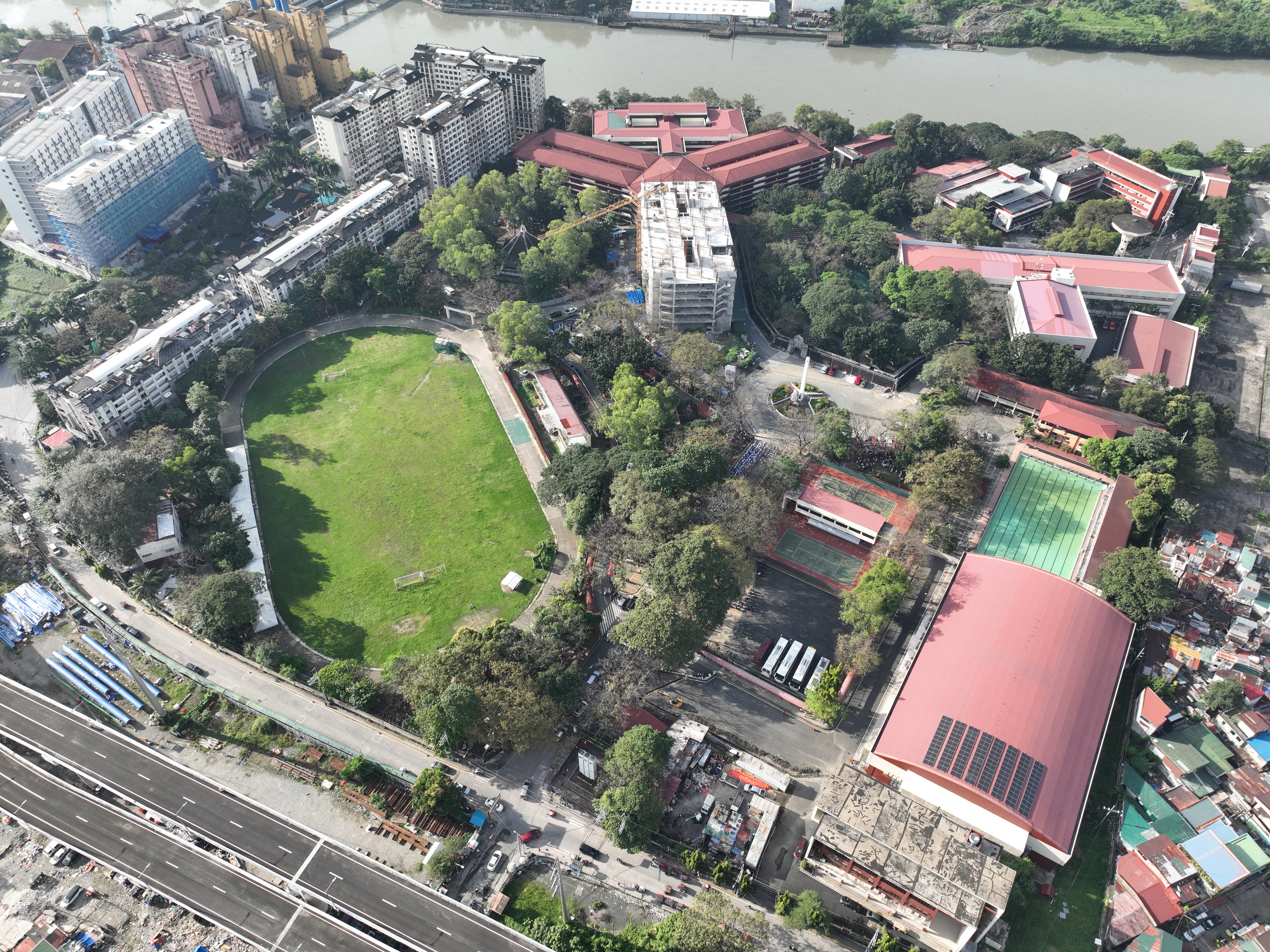
Aerial view of the PUP Mabini Campus (2026)

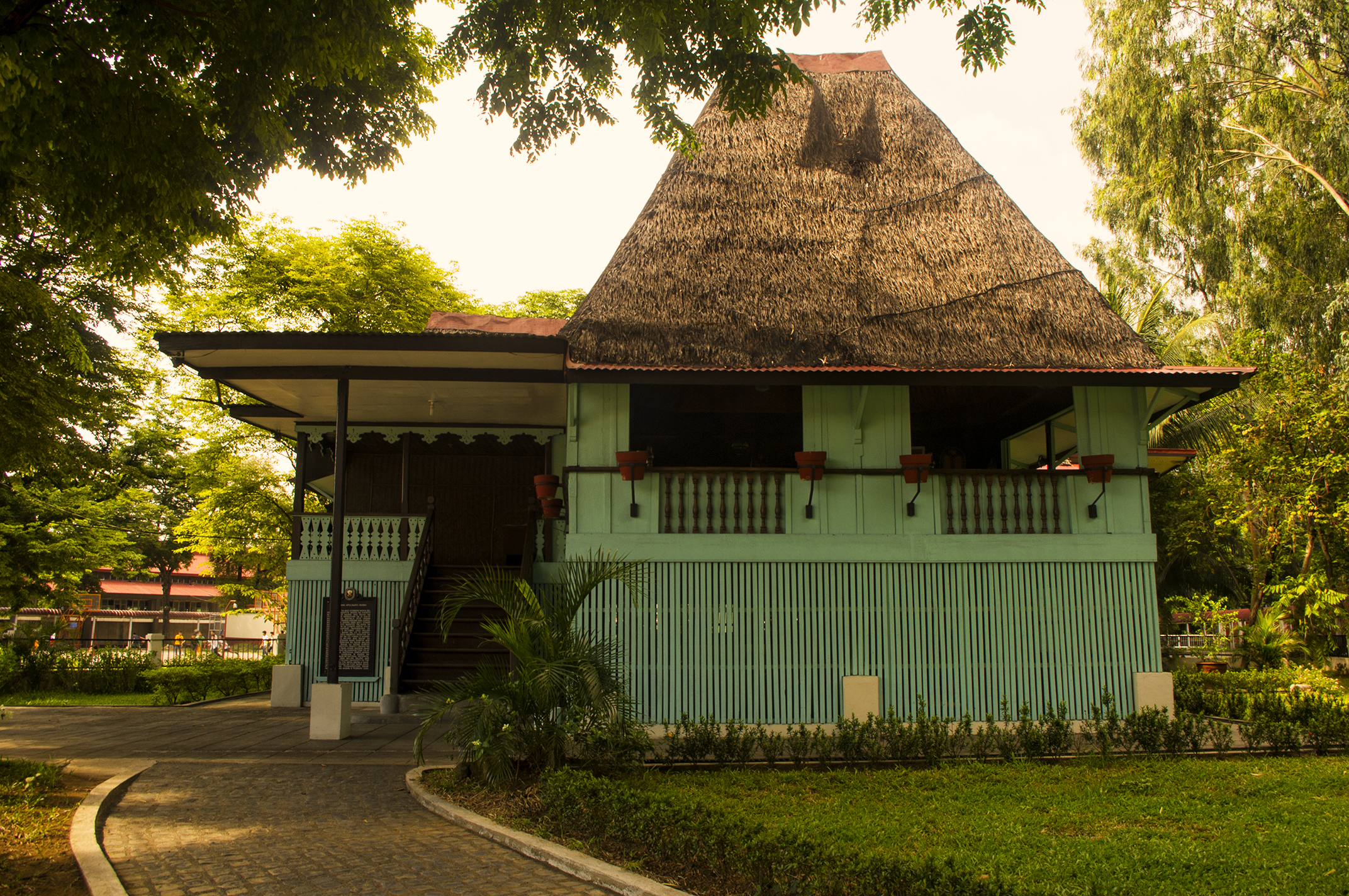
Mabini Shrine is a listed national cultural property.

Polytechnic University of the Philippines is located in three campuses that are scattered across Santa Mesa, Manila. These campuses are commonly referred as PUP Santa Mesa. The Mabini and NDC campuses lie adjacent to the banks of the Pasig River and host a ferry station. These campuses are serviced by the Philippine National Railways South Commuter Santa Mesa station and the LRT Line 2 Pureza station. New buildings for the College of Law and Institute of Technology are being constructed in another campus in the university belt, which served as PUP's former headquarters.

=== A. Mabini Campus (Main Campus) ===
The PUP Main Campus was named after Apolinario Mabini by Dr. Nemesio Prudente, when he reorganized the university in 1988. The sprawling A. Mabini Campus, with 10.71 hectares, hosts the core cluster of academic buildings and services. The entrance to the campus is flanked by the PUP Pylon and Mural, which serve as icons of the university. The first building built on the site is the Main Academic Building, which was originally intended to be a military tenement. The Main Library, known as Ninoy Aquino Library and Learning Resources Center, is regarded as one of the largest libraries in Southeast Asia. The historic Mabini Shrine located east of Freedom Plaza, is the house where Apolinario Mabini died.

Parks inside the campus include the PUP lagoon that is sealed by walls that imitate Fort Santiago and its walls in Intramuros, and the PUP Linear Park that was constructed in 2006 at the banks of the Pasig River. The Freedom Plaza in front of the Main Academic Building was built for PUP's Centennial Year that was celebrated in 2004. Its construction was finished in 2007. Sports facilities in the campus include the PUP Gymnasium and Sports Center, an Olympic-size swimming pool, two basketball courts, tennis courts, and the university oval (sports ground) and grandstand.

Some of the newest buildings in PUP are the Engineering and Sciences Research Center designed by prominent Filipino Architect and PUP alumnus Royal Pineda, PUP Laboratory High School Building and the PUP Open University System Building. In 2022, the university started a new nine-storey building project that will replace the Main Academic Building to accommodate the increasing student population and disaster risks. The first phase of the project, the North Wing, costs ₱ 187.3 million pesos and is targeted to be complete in 12 months. The other wings will also be demolished and reconstructed in two more phases, aimed to be finished by 2025.

=== NDC Compound Campus ===
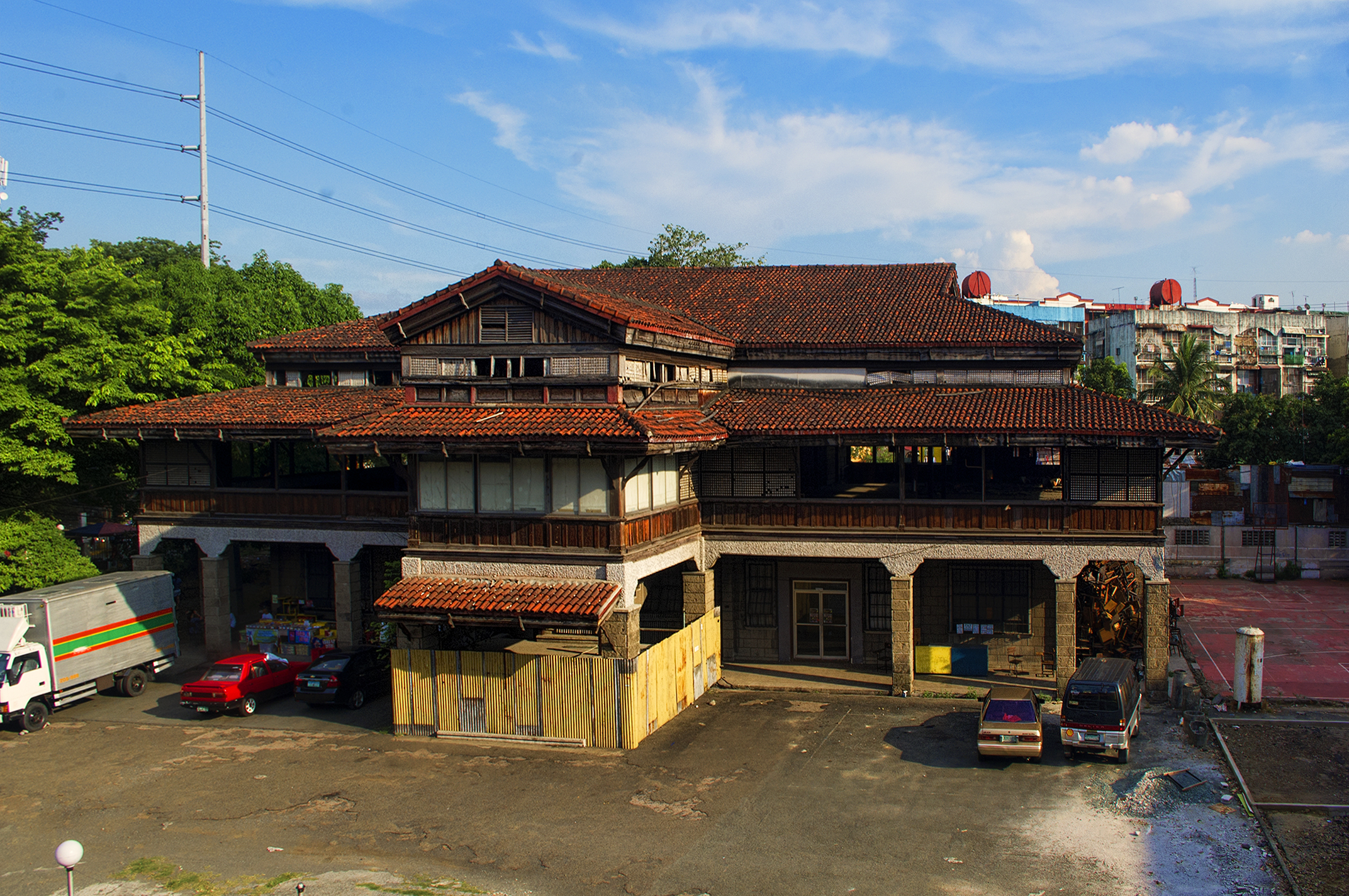
The Carriedo Mansion, popularly known as the PUP Antique House, is one of the assets transferred by the National Development Company to PUP. It is currently unusable.

The PUP-NDC Compound Campus contains the College of Architecture, Design, and the Built Environment (formerly College of Architecture and Fine Arts), College of Communication, College of Engineering, and the Institute of Technology. Among its notable landmark is the Carriedo Mansion, which is popularly known as the Antique House. It was transferred by the National Development Corporation to the National Government in 1989 which in turn transferred it to PUP. It also contains the PUP BPO Center which was launched through a partnership between PUP and the Civil Service Commission.

The campus of PUP was given by the National Development Corporation when it moved out in 1989, transferring all its assets to the national government which in turn will be given to PUP. The campus of the National Development Corporation is leased to several warehouses, factories and other government institutions and private offices. The lessees have the option to purchase the land according to their agreement with the company. When the National Development Corporation decided to move out, however, it decided that all its assets be transferred to the National Government and be given to PUP. This was ratified by President Corazon Aquino when she signed Memorandum Order No. 214, s. 1989 on January 6, 1989.

Firestone Ceramics, Incorporated is one of the lessees of the National Development Company. It occupies 1.8 hectares adjacent to the A. Mabini Campus. The company filed a case against PUP when the university tried to take over the land they occupy. Because the land was protected by a contract between the NDC and Firestone Ceramics that enables the latter to purchase the land, the Supreme Court ruled in favor of Firestone Ceramics and granted it its right of first refusal. However, the Court acknowledges the need of PUP to expand, but says it can do so in other ways. PUP unsuccessfully tries to take over a lot measuring 2,407 meters owned by Golden Horizon Realty Corporation inside the NDC Compound whose case is very similar to that of the Firestone Ceramics years earlier.

In 2007, PUP purchased two five-storey condotel-hostel buildings near its NDC Campus from the Government Service Insurance System to accommodate its growing student population. The buildings, known as PUP Condotel, were worth ₱575.7 million upon its purchase. The Commission on Audit labeled it as a "waste of government funds" because the buildings were in unusable condition at the time of its purchase. Only PUP Condotel Building A was rehabilitated and is currently in use while Building B is still unusable. The rehabilitation cost already amounted to ₱101.3 million as of 2013. The overall cost for the buildings, including its rehabilitation, already amounts to ₱677.1 million and balloons higher as rehabilitation continues.

=== M. H. Del Pilar Campus ===
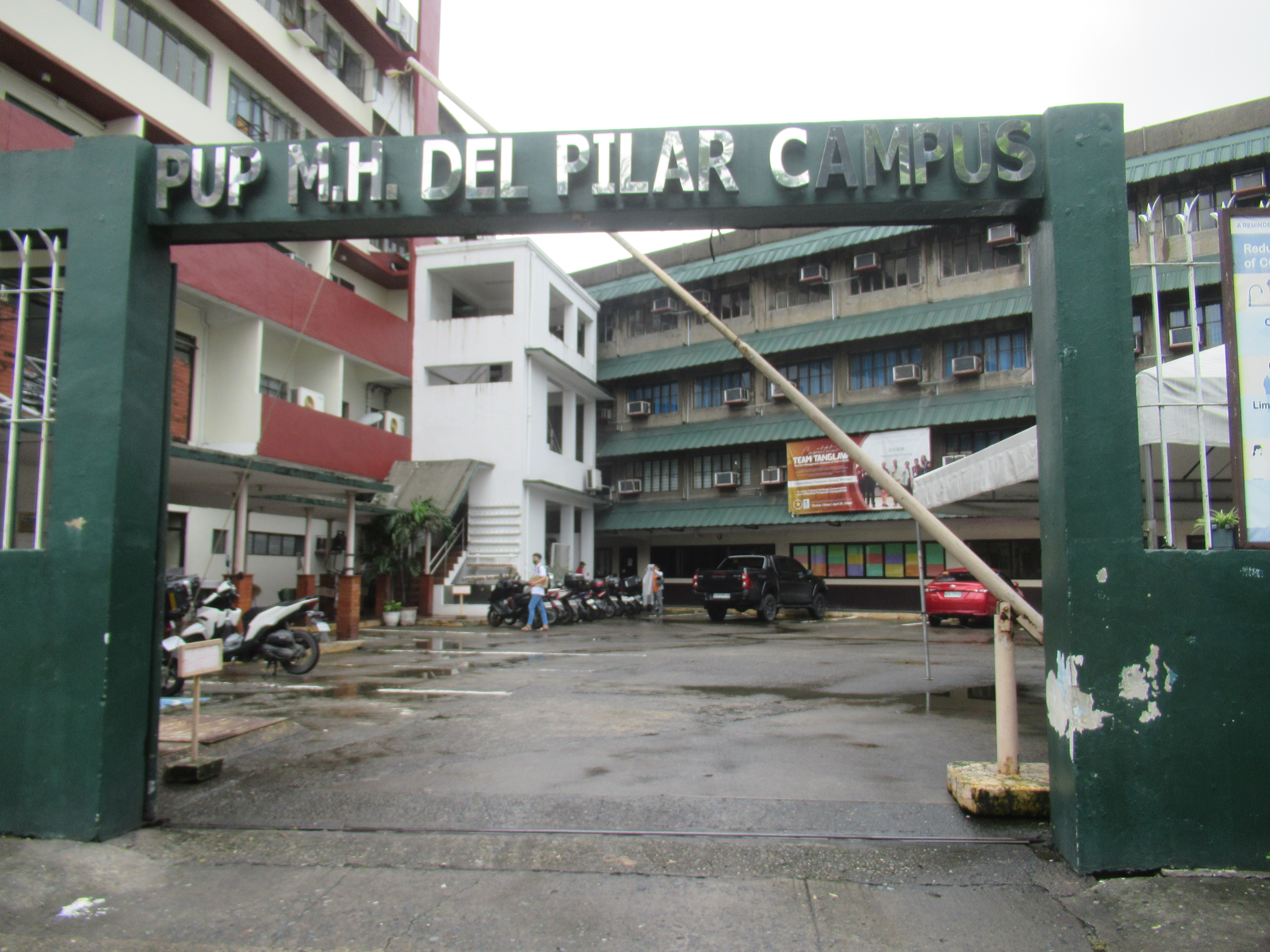
The PUP M. H. Del Pilar Campus

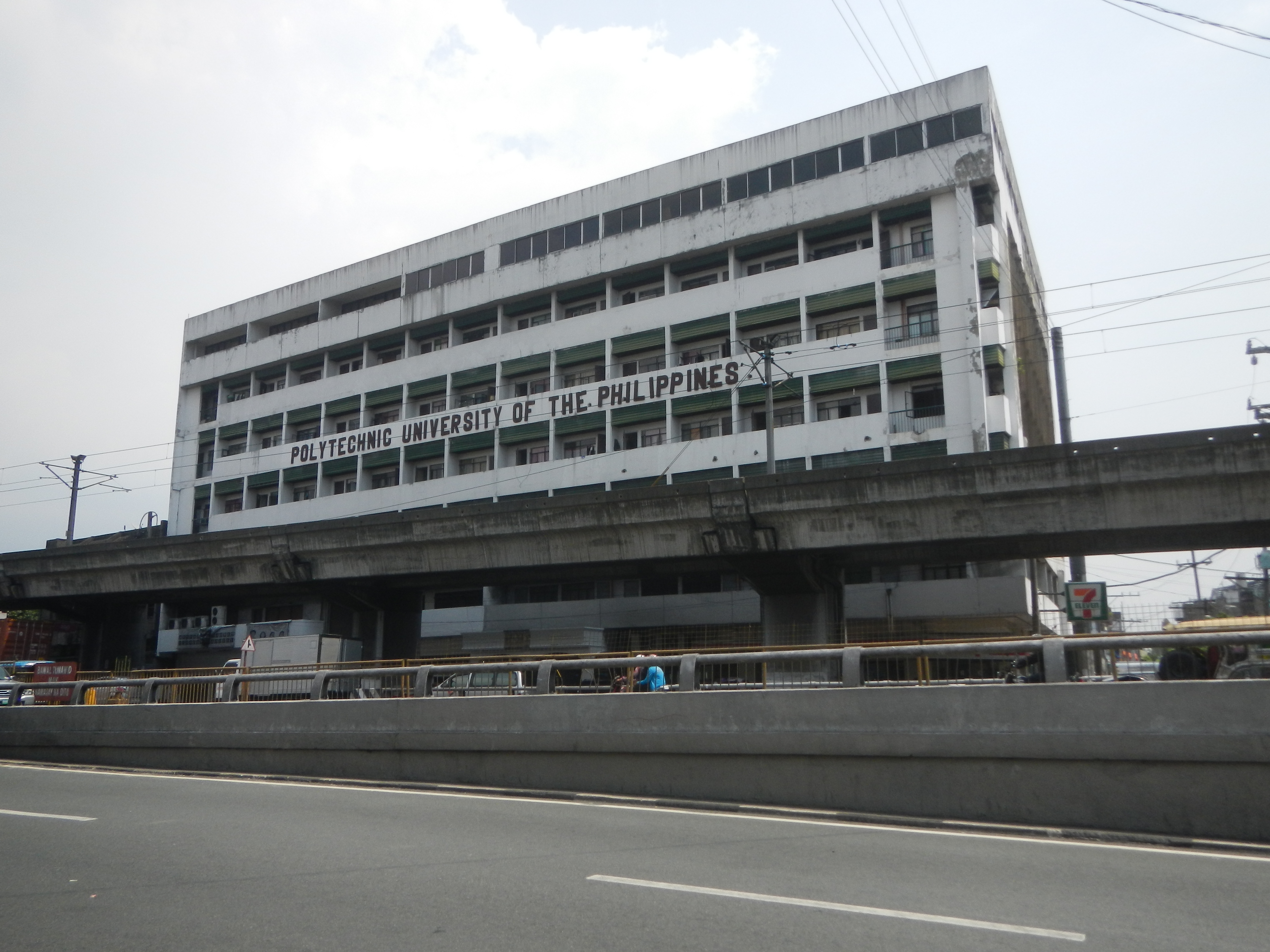
The PUP Hasmin Hostel, the home of the College of Tourism, Hospitality, and Transportation Management.

The PUP M. H. Del Pilar Campus, named after Marcelo H. Del Pilar, contains the Graduate School and the College of Tourism, Hospitality, and Transportation Management (CTHTM). It also contains the Hasmin Hostel, formerly a budget hostel which was purchased by PUP in the late 1980s. Currently, it provides the sleeping and residential quarters for the students and faculty of PUP. The hostel also serves as the training grounds for CTHTM students. The current Director of the campus is Joseph M. Lardizabal.

=== J.P. Rizal Campus ===
The PUP Rizal Campus inside the university belt was the main campus of the university from 1947 until 1968. On July 31, 1947, two buildings at Lepanto Street (now S. H. Loyola Street) in Sampaloc, Manila were leased to the government for the exclusive use of the then PSC. Shortly before the award, one of the schoolhouse buildings was temporarily used by the first Congress of the Philippines until 1945. One year later, the school acquired its P.E. Grounds, adjacent to its campus. The PUP Technopreneurial School, now the Institute of Technology, occupied the campus until 2007.

In 2020, the university started constructing new buildings in the vacant lots of the campus, starting with a new five-story academic building beside the University of the East campus. In 2021, the Department of Public Works and Highways started the construction of a new seven-storey building for the College of Law in the north area of the campus. The building will have 13 classrooms, 9 offices and other facilities such as Moot court, student centers and assembly hall. It was also announced that the Institute of Technology (ITech) will return to the Rizal campus.

== PUP satellite campuses ==
PUP currently operates 23 campuses around the country. 10 of these are campuses funded by the local government unit where it is located. 2 additional campuses has already opened: PUP Leyte Campus and PUP Caloocan Campus. Meanwhile, another 2 campuses will open, 1 each in Bulacan and Laguna. | These campuses are headed by directors, reporting to the Vice President for Campuses on the Mabini Campus.

PUP Campuses
Campus	Location	Picture
PUP Manila (Mabini Campus)	Santa Mesa, Manila	
PUP Manila (NDC Compound)	Santa Mesa, Manila	
PUP Manila (Institute of Technology)	Santa Mesa, Manila	
PUP Manila (Architecture and Engineering Building)	Santa Mesa, Manila	
PUP Manila (Communication Building)	Santa Mesa, Manila	
PUP Manila (Graduate School)	Santa Mesa, Manila	
PUP Manila (J.P. Rizal Campus)	Sampaloc, Manila	
PUP Caloocan	Rainbow Village, Camarin Road, Deparo, Caloocan City	

== Administration ==
Governance of PUP is vested upon the Board of Regents, which exercises policy-making functions to carry out the mission and programs of the university by virtue of Republic Act No. 8292, the Higher Education Modernization Act of 1997. PUP is administered by Dr. Manuel M. Muhi, President and he is assisted by an Executive Vice President and six Vice Presidents.

As of December 31, 2016, PUP had a total of 3,078 personnel complement, composed of 2,236 faculty, 51 officials, 297 regular employees, 468 casual employees, 18 consultants and eight job orders inclusive of the branches and campuses.

== Academics ==
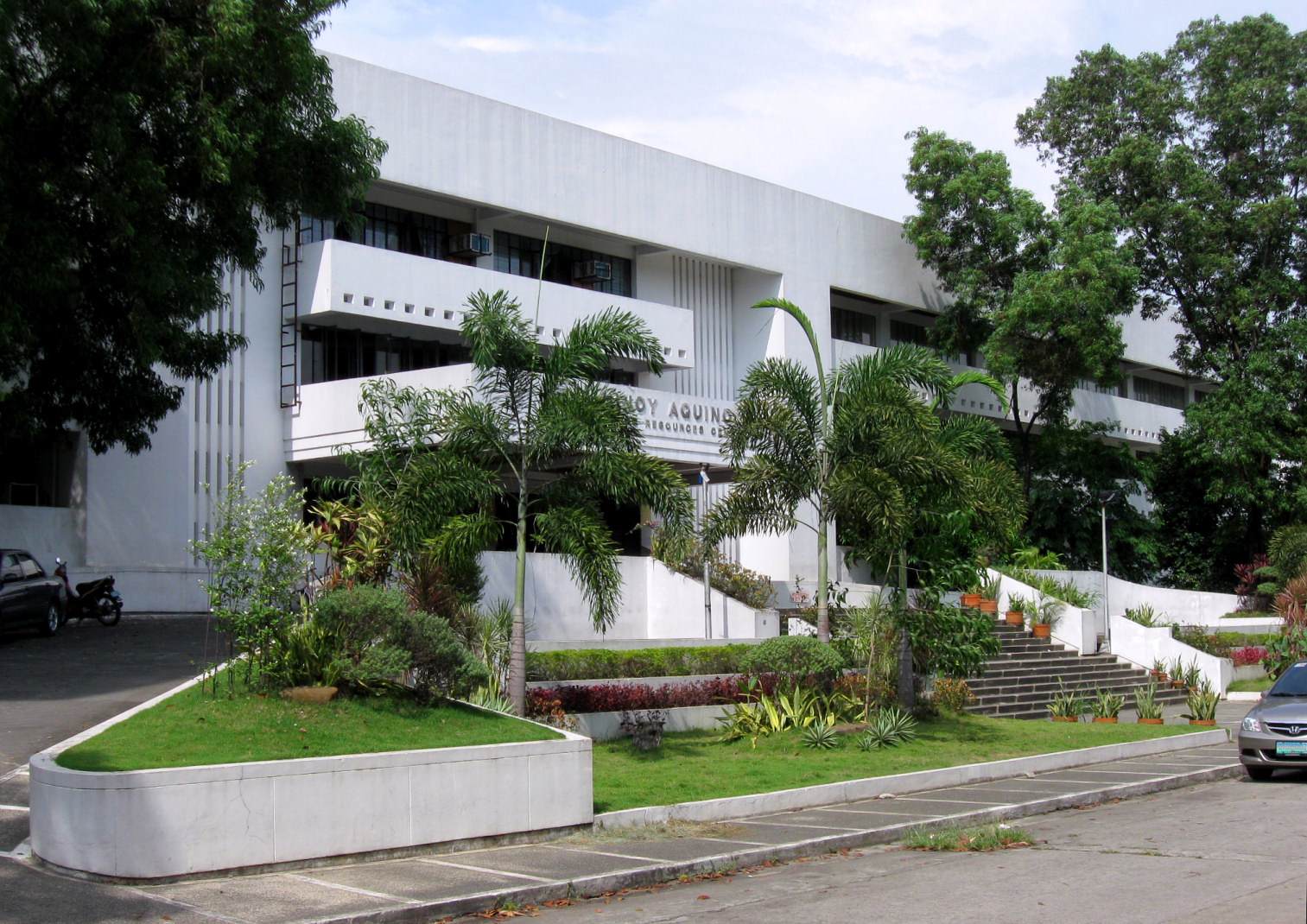
The Ninoy Aquino Library and Learning Resources Center is regarded as one of the largest libraries in Southeast Asia.

PUP is broadly organized into 14 colleges, two high school departments (the Laboratory High School and the Senior High School), the Open University System and a Graduate School. It offers an extensive selection of more than 90 undergraduate and graduate programs. The Graduate School and the College of Education confers doctoral and master's degrees. The PUP Open University System, which offers its distance learning education programs, is the first institution of distance learning education in the Philippines and is located inside the Ninoy Aquino Library and Learning Resources Center. The Institute of Technology does not require passing the entrance test for admission and offers six diploma programs.

PUP formerly had the lowest tuition among all the universities and colleges in the country. With the passage of Republic Act 10931, students of all State Universities and Colleges will have subsidized tuition. Students will now only pay the miscellaneous fee.

An aerial view of the PUP Engineering and Architecture Building.

The oldest college in PUP is the College of Education, tracing its roots back to a course in business education in 1904. From the entrepreneurship courses offered in 1904 began the College of Business Administration, while the College of Accountancy and Finance started in 1960 as a bachelor's program in Commerce with a major in accounting. The College of Computer and Information Sciences started in 1969 as an Electronic Data Process course offered by the College of Accountancy. To develop the culture of sports and athleticism, the present-day College of Human Kinetics was established in 1978 as the College of Physical Education and Sports. The College of Engineering was established in 1986 as the College of Engineering and Architecture. In 2001, several collegiate departments were elevated into their own colleges which resulted in the establishment of the College of Architecture and Fine Arts, College of Communication, College of Law, and the College of Tourism, Hospitality, and Transportation Management. Its newest academic units are the College of Arts and Letters, College of Political Science and Public Administration and the College of Social Sciences and Development, all of which are founded through an organizational restructuring in 2012.

The PUP Laboratory High School, which is one of few high schools in the country offering a commercial curriculum, is regarded as one of the best high schools in the country and serves as the laboratory school of the College of Education where students practice-teach. In 2015, the PUP Senior High School was created as a separate department from the Laboratory High School and currently offers all the tracks in the K–12 curriculum.

PUP's bachelor's program in Filipinology and Journalism were recognized by the Commission on Higher Education as Centers of Development. Its Bachelor of Science in Information Technology program was recognized as a Center of Development for Excellence by the Commission on Higher Education from 2000 up to 2006.

=== Student population, admission and enrollment ===
First-time freshman profile
	2018	2017	2016	2015	2014	2013	2012
Freshman Applicants	–	–	–	–	41,824	36,458	34,198
Admitted	–	–	–	–	10,820	10,280	8,868
% Admitted	–	–	–	–	25.87	28.19	25.93
Enrollment	–	–	–	–	–	–	–

Admission to PUP, particularly on its main campuses in Manila, is highly selective. To be admitted, aspiring students must pass the PUP College Entrance Test. Admission to a selected program is based on the test score and the availability of slots. Starting 2026, there will be 2 types of passers: secured slot passers, and first-come, first-serve passers. For passers who choose Architecture and Interior Design as their first choice, they will undergo the CADBE Aptitude test, those who pass the aptitude test will only be allowed to enroll in the University's BS Architecture and BS Interior Design programs. Of an estimated 100,000 annual PUPCET takers, around 8,000 to 12,000 will be accepted due to the university's limited budget. In 2018, it is estimated that roughly 66,000 took the college entrance exam according to the Philippine Senate President Koko Pimentel. With a population of 71,963 students in 2016, it is the largest state university in the Philippines.

PUP claims to maintain an average size of 40–50 students per class, but the lack of facilities and growing student population causes overcrowding in classes. A total of 36,527 students on the Manila campus alone are enrolled in the Baccalaureate Program, while 1,658 undergrads are taking up Diploma Courses. About 897 students are also enrolled in the undergraduate programs of the PUP Open University and ETEEAP/Non-Traditional Programs. PUP operates year-round with two semesters and a summer. Following the shift to the international school calendar, classes for Academic Year 2017–2018 were supposed to start in August, but was reverted to June due to issues regarding the proposed transitional semester by the administration. Summer sessions depend on the program and on the campus. More than a hundred percent of the student population are foreigners from China, Singapore, Indonesia, Cambodia, Myanmar, Tanzania, Nigeria, and Ghana. Also, students from South Korea visit PUP every summer to take up intensive English courses.

=== Research ===
The PUP Engineering and Science Research Center houses the CCIS, CE, and ITECH since 2019.

Research is a major function of the university. As a result, research undertakings in PUP are extensive. The Office of the Vice President for Research, Extension, Planning and Development is the official research and planning agency of PUP. It is composed of six research offices and five institutes. PUP is a member of the De La Salle University–Commission on Higher Education Zonal Research Center, and the Higher Education Research Consortium Philippines. Three of its research publications are accredited by the Commission on Higher Education, these are the Mabini Review, PUP Journal Science and Technology and the Social Sciences and Development Review.

PUP organized the 2011 and hosted the 2013 International Research Conference in Higher Education.

The 4-storey Engineering and Science Research Center, designed by Filipino Architect Royal Pineda, is the central research building of PUP. It is occupied by the research institutes of the university and laboratories of the College of Computer and Information Sciences, the College of Engineering, and the Institute of Technology.

== Reputation and rankings ==
As of July 2022, the university offers 68 undergraduate and graduate programs. All programs are accredited by the Accrediting Agency of Chartered Colleges and Universities in the Philippines (AACCUP), with 28 earning the highest level of accreditation. Two of these programs, Journalism and Filipino, were granted Center of Development status by the Commission on Higher Education. A 2018 survey of 503 JobStreet employers ranked PUP as the top choice of employers in general, the top choice in the business process outsourcing (BPO) industry, and the second choice in the Manufacturing, IT, and Banking industries.

In 2023, PUP earned an over-all Three Star rating from the QS Stars university rating system and eventually placed 88th in QS' Asian University Rankings – South-Eastern Asia and 551–660th in the Asian University Rankings in Asia for 2024. This places PUP within the top five universities in the Philippines. PUP previously ranked 300+ in the QS Asia University Rankings in 2012.

== Student life ==
PUP has a variety of longstanding traditions and celebrations such as its month-long Founding Anniversary held every October, with post-foundation anniversary events being held afterwards. The Pylon Run, held until 2019 at during founding anniversary by the PUP chapter of Alpha Phi Omega is PUP's own version of the Oblation Run.. Balik Sinta which is held around the months of July and August, PUP's own version of UST's ROARientation, and Tanglaw Fest held around January.

=== Student organizations ===
PUP's more than a hundred student organizations and clubs cover a wide range of interests. Cultural organizations are under the University Center for Culture and the Arts. The Central Student Council is the undergraduate student government of PUP. Under the Central Student Council is the PUP Commission on Student Organizations and Accreditation which has the mandate to accredit, re-accredit, or re-validate student organizations.

Notable political student organizations are Anakbayan, Students' Party for Equality and Advancement of Knowledge (SPEAK), Sandigan ng Mag-aaral para sa Sambayanan (SAMASA).

Popular music organizations include the PUP Bagong Himig Serenata, PUPLHS Chorale, Polysound, and formerly the internationally acclaimed bamboo orchestra group PUP Banda Kawayan (now known as Banda Kawayan Pilipinas).

The Federation of Alumni Associations of PUP, Inc. (FEDAAPI) is the official alumni association of PUP. It oversees various activities for alumni such as class reunions, local gatherings, alumni travel, and career services. The PUP Tahanan ng Alumni Building was established through FEDAAPI.

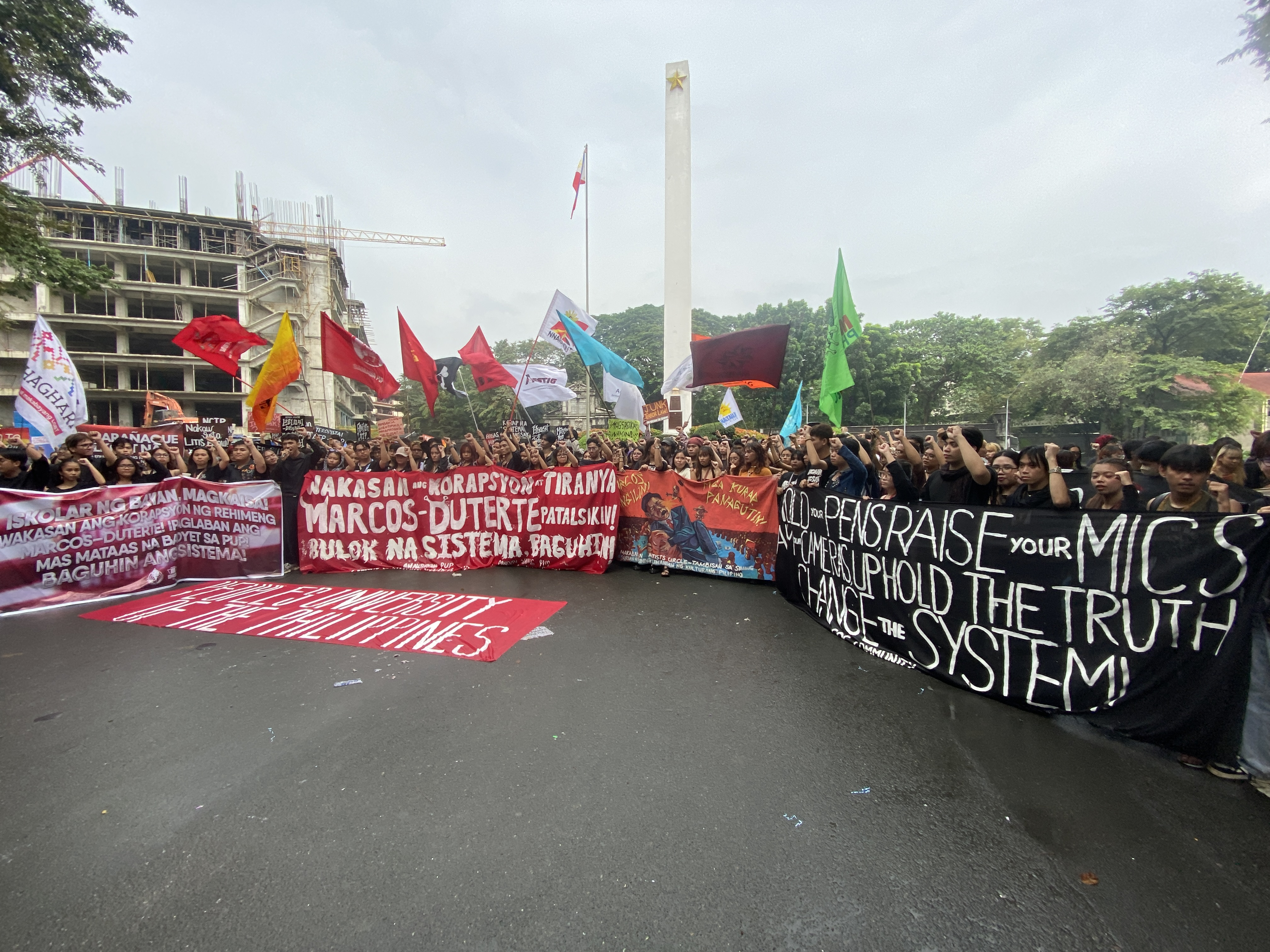

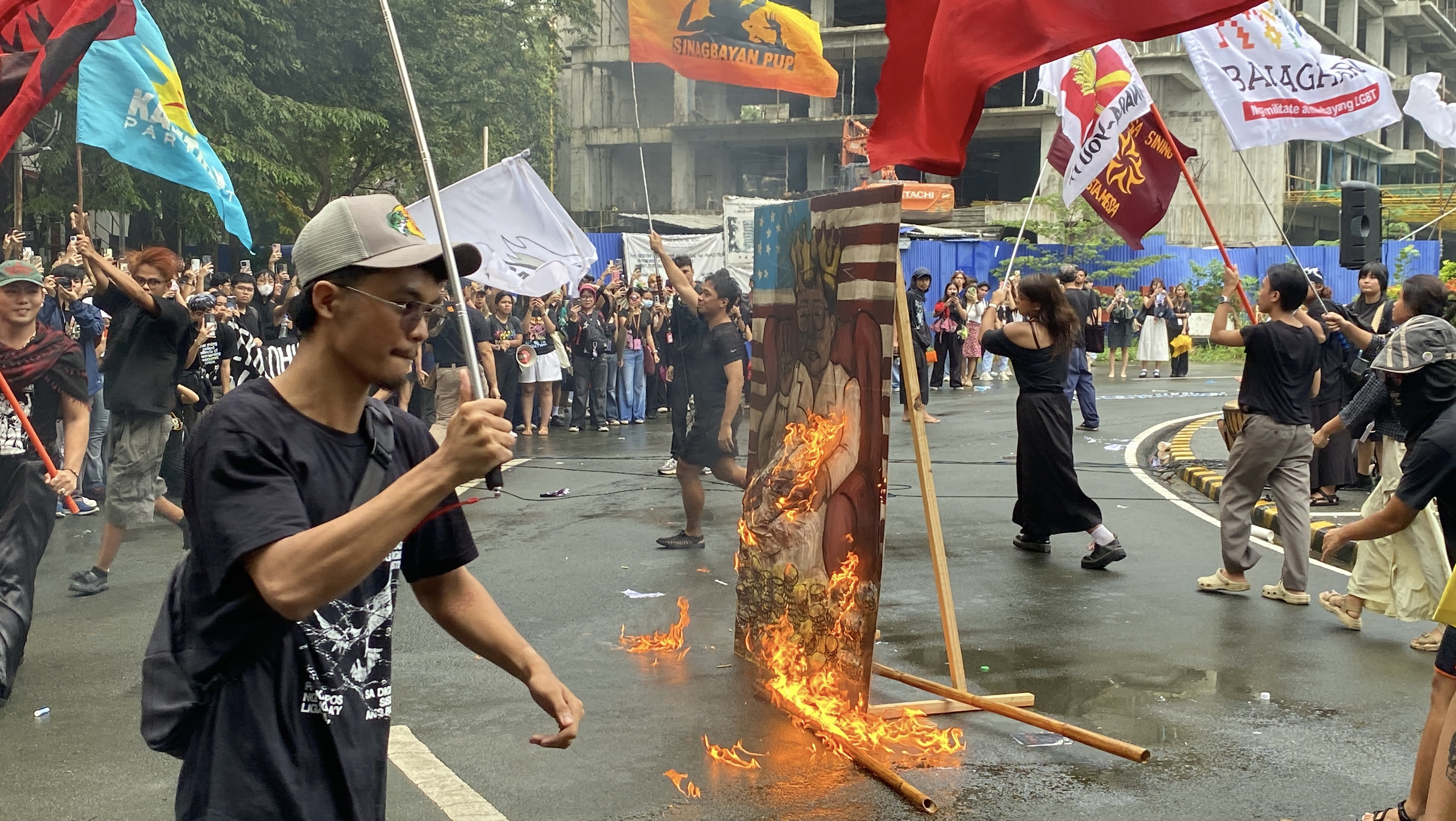
On October 10, 2025, more than 15,000 PUP students walked out and burned an effigy of President Marcos Jr. as part of the 2025 Philippine anti-corruption protests

=== Activism ===
PUP is known for its student activism. PUP has many student groups focused on political reform. The militant national democratic partisan groups are the cause of frequent protests and rallies on campus. PUP's variety of partisan groups include liberal, socialist, social democratic, and several political organizations.

In March 2013, some activist students burned chairs in a protest regarding an alleged tuition hike. The incident came in the wake of the suicide of a University of the Philippines Manila freshman who allegedly could not afford to pay her tuition. The students involved in the violent protests faced sanctions from the university. Student activists, however, have already destroyed school properties way back in 2010, where hundreds of agitated students walked out of the room and began throwing dilapidated chairs, tables, and examination papers from the Main Building to denounce an allegedly 2,000% tuition hike.

PUP is also known for holding one of the first pride marches in Asia, with the first one organized in the 1990s. Since 2016, its LGBT organization Kasarianlan annually holds the PUP Pride March. Pride events are held in March at the university to spread awareness on LGBT rights and push for passage of policies including the Anti-discrimination bill.

== Media ==
=== Print media ===
The Observer is PUP's official publication and is published monthly on print and online.

The Catalyst, formerly The New Businessman, is the official student publication of PUP. It was founded on February 25, 1986 and is written in both English and Filipino.

In 2017, Anakbayan claimed that the university administration ordered "the takeover of campus student publications through an administration office called Student Publication Section." PUP President Emanuel de Guzman debunked the claim, stating that he "decided to restore the office that will oversee that selection of writers and editors" and it will be composed of advisers and former editors-in-chief of The Catalyst, which has been historically militant.

Notable editors of The Catalyst include Emanuel de Guzman (12th President of the Polytechnic University of the Philippines and editor-in-chief of the publication from 1989 to 1990) and Manuel Muhi (13th President of the Polytechnic University of the Philippines)

=== Other media ===
PUP CreaTV is regarded as the first university-based online channel in the Philippines. It was launched in February 2013 and its pioneer programs are "The Observer Flash Online" (newscast), "PUP TV: Pinaka Usap-usapan sa Pamantasan" (feature magazine program), and "State U" (web series).

DZMC is the campus radio station operated by the College of Communication. Its programming tentatively includes news, sports, educational/children's programs, talk shows, commentaries, to music programs and request shows, mostly geared towards the interests of students, faculty and the administration. All operations have been put on hold, due to reasons of pending license applications. DZ1PUP, an amateur radio club, is known for its involvement in a wide range of amateur radio activities, including contesting, research, and community involvement. PUPHAM-RCG, a non-profit university based radio station, is known to assist those who need fast and rapid response communications within the university and nearby areas.

== Athletics ==
The former PUP Gymnasium and Sports Center which was demolished in 2017 for the construction of a new University Gym on the same site.

PUP's varsity teams compete in the National Capital Region Conference of the State Colleges and Universities Athletic Association. The university's basketball team also played at the National Athletic Association of Schools, Colleges and Universities in 2013. The athletic teams of PUP are called the PUP Radicals.

Its volleyball and basketball teams play at the PUP Gymnasium and Sports Center. Softball is played at the PUP Oval field, which was recently rehabilitated in 2013. Non-varsity student sports clubs that compete with other area universities include the PUP Ultimate, which played at the 2011 University FriXbee Championship held at the University of the Philippines Diliman.

The university's official volleyball team also played at the 2nd Conference of the 12th Season of Shakey's V-League and was known as the PUP Lady Radicals; avoiding the usage of the name Mighty Maroons because of its resemblance to the name of rival team UP Fighting Maroons. The team was the replacement for the De La Salle Lady Spikers who pulled out of the league due to its commitment in other tournaments.

The PUP Stars Cheerleading Team, the official cheerleading team representative of PUP, was formed in 1998 and was the champion in the 2011 SCUAA-NCR Cheerdance Competition. They were also the champions in the 2006 and 2010 seasons of the Philippine Inter Schools, Colleges and Universities Athletic Association cheerdance competition.

== People ==
Persons affiliated to the university, either as students, faculty members, or administrators, are called as "PUPians". Like in all Philippine state universities, students and graduates are also called "Iskolar ng Bayan" (Scholars of the Nation).

=== Notable Alumni ===
The Polytechnic University of the Philippines has numerous notable alumni locally and internationally.

- Bayani Agbayani - Actor
- Joy Barcoma - 2025 Miss Philippines Earth
- Rustica Carpio - Playwright and actress
- Herminio Dagohoy - Reverend
- Ted Failon - Broadcaster and former politician
- Moymoy Palaboy - Lip singing duo Moymoy and Rodfil
- Papa Jackson - Radio disc jockey
- Tado Jimenez - Actor
- Marc Logan (broadcast journalist)
- Satur Ocampo - Former Bayan Muna Representative
- Marina Summers - Filipino drag performer
- Eli San Fernando Kamanggagawa Representative
- Eddie Villanueva - Jesus Is Lord Church Worldwide founder and CIBAC representative,
