= Ninoy Aquino Library and Learning Resources Center =

University library in Manila, Philippines

Coordinates: 14.5978°N 121.0097°E

- Location: Sta. Mesa, Manila, Philippines
- Type: Academic, Museum, National

Other information
- Director: Marcela R. Figura, RL, MLIS
- Website: www.pup.edu.ph/academic/nallrc
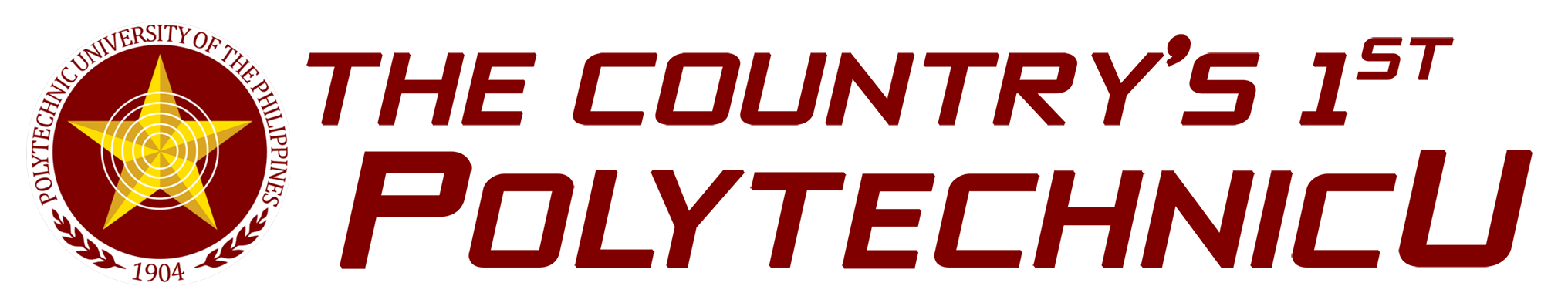

The Ninoy Aquino Library and Learning Resources Center (NALLRC) is the library system of the Polytechnic University of the Philippines composed of libraries providing services to the PUP System. Its headquarters is in the building of the same name, located in Manila, Philippines. NALLRC offers various services and development of programs to its clientele.

The NALLRC Main Library is regarded as one of the largest libraries in Southeast Asia. The building is also home to the university's College of Law and Open University System.

== History ==
The university library and learning resource center had its share in the nomadic history of PUP. Like the university, it had no home of its own until after the Second World War.

=== Early years ===
In 1933, it shared a space with the Philippine Normal School. In 1947, the Philippine Congress allotted the amount of P120, 000.00 for the construction of the Philippine School of Commerce library and social hall buildings. Then PSC President, Luis F. Reyes, acted as Administrator of Libraries. The library had an initial collection of twelve (12) volumes as the library collection started to grow during the period 1952-1961 under Ms. Dolores A. Teotico, Library Administrator who was appointed Supervising Librarian in 1962. During this period, the library adopted an open-shelf system. Room I of the Library Annex in Lepanto, Sampaloc was converted as reading room for male students and an additional librarian was assigned at the High School reading room.

=== 1960s ===
During the school year 1964-1965, more books were acquired through purchase and donation. The Library Board was created to act as formulating body of the library. It was during this period when the policy of suspending the lending of books during the examination period was lifted. In 1966, library exchanges were practiced. This enabled the library to maximize its services to its clientele despite the difficulty of purchasing books due to very strict government rules and regulations.

In 1967, the college was given an allocation of P50, 000.00 for the purchase of library books. Thus, more books were purchased. Text and reference books which were not available in local bookstores were ordered direct from foreign publishers. During the school year 1968–1969, the Graduate School Library was established. To improve the collection in the College Library and to support the Graduate School Library, the Board of Trustees allocated an additional amount of P100, 000.00 to the library.

=== 1970s ===
During the fiscal year 1970–1971, the Main Library transferred 1,461 and 51 volumes of books to the Sta. Mesa and high school libraries, respectively. It was also during this period that the Graduate School Library started its operation with Mr. Bonifacio C. Macanas as the Supervising Librarian. Within the period 1971–1972, the College Library had units in all campuses with a collection of 14,748 volumes.

From 1972 to 1973, the College Library operated five library units, as follows: one unit serving the graduate students; three units catering to the undergraduate students; and one unit servicing the library needs of the high school students. On December 15, 1973, upon the representation of Dr. Narciso Albarracin, who was then serving as the Officer-in-Charge of the PCC, Asia Foundation donated 800 books and 100 assorted cliff notes (a paperbound compilation of short stories and other articles) to the PCC library.

During the academic year 1973–1974, the PCC library was centralized at the newly renovated Loyola Annex. As in the past, an open-shelf system was adopted during this period. During the academic year 1974–1975, the College Library reduced its units into three, confining them in its two campuses: the Annex campus in Lepanto and the Mabini Campus in Sta. Mesa. The Annex library served both the graduate and undergraduate students while the two units in the Sta. Mesa campus served the undergraduate and the high school students.

In 1977, a library consultant was appointed to assist in updating and enriching the learning resources of the school. The library continued to increase its collection in terms of books and periodicals. Likewise, during this year, a new library building known as the Bagong Lipunan Library was inaugurated, with Dona Josefa Edralin Marcos, mother of then President Ferdinand E. Marcos, as guest speaker. Mrs. Estrella V. Manuel was designated Coordinator of Libraries. In 1978, the Philippine College of Commerce (PCC) was converted into a university and was consequently named Polytechnic University of the Philippines (PUP). The library was renamed Department of Library and Related Services. Between the periods 1979 and 1980, another wing of the library building was completed. The name of the library was changed to Learning Resource Center and Dr. Estrella V. Manuel was designated as Director of Libraries. Mr. Bonifacio C. Macanas remained as Chief Librarian. Since the university started offering a program in Library Science, the library also served as a practicum site for students in library science.

As part of the program of the Library Director, library personnel were given professional trainings, were sent to book fairs and were given the chance to participate in National Book Week celebrations. Book exhibits were held. It was also during this year that the A-V (Audio-Visual) Center was established. The Library acquired 2,227 volumes of books through purchase and 706 volumes through donation from Dr. Juan L. Manuel, Sr., former Secretary of Education, Culture and Sports. Likewise, the library secured 147 pamphlets and brochures mostly for its Filipiniana collection, from various government agencies, embassies, faculty, PUP officials and others. PUP President Pablo T. Mateo and Office of Media Affairs Minister Gregorio Cendaña signed the PUP-NMPC agreement on audio-visual linkage. The two branches of the university, PUP-BEPZ in Bataan and PUP-Lopez in Quezon established their libraries during this period.

=== 1980s ===
In 1981, the library continued to acquire the latest books in all areas of study to add to the increasing accessions of four libraries located in the following campuses: Sta. Mesa; Lepanto; PUP-BEPZ in Bataan; and PUP-Lopez in Quezon. In addition, the CPA Review Center Library was opened as an additional unit of the library system. In order to draw attention to the resources available in the university's libraries, the Director of Learning Resource Center mounted a program to celebrate National Book Week, where the importance of books and the use of the same for intellectual and social development were emphasized by Dr. Serafin Quiason, who served as guest speaker of the program. The university continued to maintain its Book Bank to help the students in their book requirements.

In 1987, the name of the Library was changed from Learning Resource Center to Library and Book Exchange Center. Mrs. Mona Lisa P. Leguiab was designated Chief Librarian. A University Library Advisory Board was constituted with the PUP Executive Vice President as Presiding Officer, Vice President for Student Services and External Affairs as Vice Chairman, Chief Librarian as Secretary, Vice President for Academic Affairs, Deans and Directors of Colleges and Institutes, and Director, CPA Review Center as members.

In 1988, the construction of a four-storey library building at the Mabini Campus started. Because of the demand for adequate and conducive space in 1989, the Graduate School Library was transferred to Hasmin Hostel building at the M. H. del Pilar Campus. However, it coincided with the closure of the CPA Review Center Library, causing the CPA Review Center Library to cease operation. The intent to meet the thrust of the university drove the Library to continue to transform through active participation of staff by attending seminars, fora and series of training related to the field. Library personnel were encouraged to enroll in Library and Information Science course and training on computer literacy program. At that time, there was an increase in acquisition of books and professional journals. Linkages with other libraries and development and improvement of facilities and services were also strengthened.

A remarkable increase in collection was realized from 1987 to 1990 with 22,161 volumes of books acquired, and 4,476 volumes received from donations. Almost 100 titles of professional journals were added to its collection through purchase and donations.

On the same year, with strong determination to support the noble vision of the university, and through the initiative of Mrs. Leguiab, automation of the library system was conceptualized. Mrs. Leguiab sought the assistance of Prof. Teresita Geronimo, then Head of the EDP Section of the university. Meeting with the demand of trends in information technology, the program for the computerization was designed and data were encoded. The computerization was already on the dry-run for implementation.

To top it all, from 1987 to 1990, true to its vision, the administration of the university fully supported the objectives of the library through notable acquisition of books and other library materials which totaled to 22,161 volumes of books and 4,476 volumes from donations and almost 100 titles of professional journals through purchase and donations.

=== 1990s ===
On September 4, 1991, a four-storey library edifice was inaugurated with Dr. Guillermo N. Carague, Secretary of the Department of Budget and Management, as Guest Speaker. Dr. Irene D. Amores was designated Director of the Library. She served as such from October 1, 1991, to June 2, 1992. During the school year 1992–1993, the PUP Hostel and the PUP College of Engineering and Architecture Libraries were established. The library continued to build its books and audio-visual materials collections. The university function rooms became venues for many cultural activities like film showing, stage plays and painting exhibits. The library collections were converted into the Library of Congress Classification System.

In 1994, Dr. Estrella V. Manuel was again designated Director of Libraries. The University Library keenly aligned itself to the forward-looking thrust of the academe as it continued updating materials for the research needs of both faculty and students. Dr. Estrella V. Manuel retired in 1996 and Mrs. Mona Lisa P. Leguiab was designated Director of Libraries. In 1997, the “Alay-Aklat Project” was initiated. This project contributed an additional 611 volumes to the library collection. Library staff joined library associations and continued their professional growth through in-house trainings.

In 1998, the in-house On-line Public Access Catalog (OPAC) was launched for implementation. The system was facilitated with catalog card and book label productions and inventory procedures, which improved the library services. In 1999, Dr. Irene D. Amores was again designated as Director of Libraries and served as such until her retirement in October 2004. The name of the library was changed to Ninoy Aquino Learning Resources Center. The University Library Advisory Board was also renamed as Learning Resources Center Advisory Board. Processing of student IDs was entrusted to the library.

=== 2000s ===
In 2002, the Ninoy Aquino Center for Human Rights was launched and the Archives Section was opened to the public as part of the university's centennial activities.

In November 2004, Dr. Amalia Cullarin Rosales, former Dean of the College of Arts, was designated as new Director of the University Library. From November 2004 October 19, 2007, the following were done in the library as a response to the needs of the time: reorganization of the Library to improve the services to its clientele; formulation of the vision, mission and goals of the library; improvement of the physical structure of the library to make it conducive to learning and research; forging linkage with the Filipinas Heritage Library of the Ayala Foundation, Inc. for the inclusion of PUP’s Filipiniana Collections to their LibraryLink Program; revision of the student library guide, publication of Library Handbook and Manual of Operations; production of the library power point presentation for use during library orientations; established the Faculty Research Center; placement of art works in the library building and inclusion of collections on our national heritage in the Museum made the Library as a repository of arts and culture; conduct of staff development through library and museum visits, intensified the computerization of the collections; and reactivation of the Film Center which has not been operational since 1999.

In November 2007, when Dr. Rosales was designated Dean of the PUP Graduate School, Mrs. Mona Lisa P. Leguiab, was again designated as Director of the Ninoy Aquino Library and Learning Resources Center. Upon assumption to office, she recommended the following: (1) the immediate operation and implementation of the Athena Software Library and Information System; (2) provision of sufficient budget for collection development, and (3) provision of Online database resources such as e-books and e-journals to meet the modern trends in information access, which were positively responded to and given priority by the PUP administration. Online database resources were acquired and the Athena Software System was operational starting the year 2008 with its launch in July 2008, with Gale Virtual reference Library and Academic OneFile through CE Logic as provider.

=== 2010 to Present ===
On November 25, 2010, the NALLRC launched its Online Public Access Catalog (OPAC) adopting the Koha Open source system in coordination with the National Library and PUP University Information System-Network Operations Center. The E-Resource Center was established to provide the library clientele free access to internet. The center can accommodate twenty five people in one sitting with five personal computers for its clientele to use.

In May 2012, Mrs. Mona Lisa P. Leguiab retired from service and, five months before her retirement, Dr. Amalia Cullarin Rosales took over in June of the same year, spending the last remaining months of her fruitful government service in the library.

It was on November 19, 2012, when the youngest and newly appointed PUP President, Dr. Emanuel C. De Guzman, issued Special Order No. 2458, s. 2012, designating one of the Chief Administrative Officers of the university, Dr. Divina T. Tormon-Pasumbal, as new Director of the Ninoy Aquino Library and Learning Resource Center. Turn-over ceremonies were held on December 13, 2012, at the Silid Lakan Dayang of the NALLRC. Through collaborative efforts of the librarians and support staff of the library, the university was able to forge the signing of three Memoranda of Agreement with two government agencies and one private corporation in a span of nine months: the Department of Science and Technology (DOST); the National Center on Disability Affairs (NCDA); and the Cebuana Lhuiller Foundation, Inc (CLFI). Through the university's linkage with DOST, it was given access to thousands of electronic books, journals, audio and video materials on science and technology through the agency's STARBOOKS—Science and Technology Academic and Research-Based Openly Operated Kiosk Station. Through NCDA, on the other hand, a Disability Section was established at the 3rd floor of the main library. This is in preparation for the envisioned program on inclusive education which the university plans to embark on in the future. On its part, the Cebuana Lhuiller Foundation, Inc. sponsored the establishment of an E-Learning Center at the Circulation wing of the library. This fully air-conditioned Center is equipped with multi-media gadgets such as high-powered sound system and microphones, LCD projector and screen, 21 computers, 3 CCTV cameras with monitor, and free wi-fi connection. It was also during this period when President De Guzman allotted 10M budget for the purchase of books.

It was also during Dr. Pasumbal's term that the University Library Board was reconstituted with the University President as chair and the Vice President for Academic Affairs as Vice Chair. In October 2014, the NALLRC entered into a memorandum of agreement with the National Economic and Development Authority (NEDA). The institution would provide the Graduate School library its published journals and other reading materials from other government agencies. The GS library then allotted a space called NEDA Nook.

Furthermore, the Graduate School students’ clamor for a GS Library Sunday Service came into reality in April 2015. This assistance was made possible through the endorsement of Vice President for Administration Prof. Alberto C. Guillo and Vice President for Academic Affairs Dr. Samuel M. Salvador with the consequent approval of President Emanuel C. De Guzman. The administration has provided a 7M budget in the years 2014 and 2015 for book acquisition. Moreover, a fiduciary fund of 9.5M enabled the library the procurement of book shelves, printing machine, air-conditioning units for the readers section, computer units and server for library full automation.

On June 30, 2015, the PUP Board of Regents approved the NALLRC Organizational Chart. With this, two (2) chiefs are placed under the NALLRC Director: the chief of library operations and chief of multimedia and e-learning services. Further, section heads were identified to handle the following sections: technical services, special collections services, readers services, and satellite libraries under the library operations unit and the multimedia venues, Cebuana Lhuiller Foundation, Inc. e-Learning Center, and other related services. September 4, 2015 marked the University Library's 24th year. A thanksgiving mass was offered which formally began the kick-off to NALLRC's 25th year.

Before 2015 ends, the procurement of Php 2.5 million worth of server and computers will have been purchased for the full operational KOHA library system and air-conditioning units will have been in place and installed in the left wing of the NALLRC. To date, the NALLRC continues to efficiently serve the public.

== Facilities and Services ==
The NALLRC functions and operates through the following units committed to provide the best services and observe the best practices in the entire system:

=== Readers Services ===
The Readers Services provides the research and information needs of the library clientele. It operates within the framework of guidelines followed efficiently by the Readers Services staff to carry out the objectives, rules, regulations, and policies of the department effectively. The sections under this department are the following: Reference, Serials, Filipiniana, Special Collections, Circulation, and Learning Hub.

Encyclopedias, dictionaries, almanacs, directories, atlases, yearbooks, gazetteers and other books on general information are housed in this section.

Serials

This unit consists of periodical collections of foreign and local journals/magazines and newspapers subscribed to by the university. It offers the following services:

Education in the News - To meet a wider scope of research needs of library users, it makes daily clippings of articles on education including those found in THE OBSERVER .

Newspaper Clippings – clippings are maintained to provide researchers easy access in locating information from newspaper sources.

Culture and Arts Updates – clippings on culture and arts for the use of the faculty, students and other library clientele are also maintained.

Filipiniana

The Filipiniana houses the library's Filipiniana collection composed of books and library materials written by Filipino authors published in the Philippines and abroad, and books about the Philippines written by foreign authors.

Special Collections

This unit is tasked to organize and establish special materials appropriate for the research needs of the university. The collections consist of government publications, undergraduate feasibility and case studies, graduate theses and dissertations, and other collections given /donated by PUP friends and faculty members.

Circulation

The Circulation Section supports the instructional and research programs of the university. It consists of the general collection of the library dealing with different branches of knowledge such as books on Humanities, Social Sciences, Languages, Pure Sciences, Management, Marketing, Fine Arts, Literature, History and other allied subjects.

=== Technical Services ===
This unit is responsible for the selection and acquisition, cataloging and classification, organization and management of library resources such as books, serials, multimedia materials, and online databases received whether through purchase, gifts or donation or through exchange programs. Its functions are distributed into its five sections, namely:

Acquisitions

The basic function of the Acquisition Section is the selection and acquisition of books and other learning resources that were evaluated, selected and recommended by Deans of Colleges, Area Chairpersons, Faculty members, who select first hand library materials for inclusion in the library holdings through book fairs and exhibit upon invitation of book dealers and suppliers.

The Section also handles and maintains purchase request files of resources selected and recommended by Deans/Chairperson, faculty. It is also responsible for the request for periodical subscriptions and receiving, recording and sending acknowledgement letters for library gifts and exchanges. Its collection includes books, periodicals, non-print materials and special collections.

Classification/Cataloging

The basic function of the Classification and Cataloging Section is to organize library resources for effective use of library clientele through:

Classification – refers to classification of books received which are represented in a classification scheme arranged systematically on the library shelves.

Cataloging – classify according to categorical system

Materials Processing

This section takes care of the technical processing of newly acquired resources such as stamping of ownership, accessioning, labeling of books, providing book pockets and date due slips and maintaining bibliographic records of library collection.

=== Special Services ===
The Special Services provides the archival, museum and special collections needs of library clientele.

Archives

This section is tasked to establish useful and relevant information related to the historical development of the university and to preserve the university's records for present and future activities. It also serves as a repository of relevant documents generated by various components of the university. The collections include relevant records, manuscripts or printed materials such as University bulletins, student and faculty organizations’ newspapers/newsletters, yearbooks, university catalogs, university research monographs, annual reports, memorabilia, faculty publications, faculty, employees and student files, photographs and University official records and other archival materials of pertinent value.

PUP Presidents’ Memorabilia

This houses some memorabilia of PUP Presidents.

PUP Memorabilia

The collection includes books and other related materials authored by PUP faculty members.

Rare Books Collection

The collection has 640 volumes of books copyrighted from 1909 to 1970.

=== Satellite Libraries ===
The Satellite Libraries cater to the library needs of the different campuses in Manila. The NALLRC has six satellite libraries such as the following:

Graduate School Library

The new Graduate School Library is located on the ground floor of the Graduate School building of the M. H. del Pilar Campus in R. Magsaysay Blvd., Sta. Mesa, Manila. Its collections consist primarily of books with comprehensive value for advanced studies, theses, dissertations and other professional books and publications intended for graduate school curricula. It is fully air-conditioned and has a NEDA Nook (National Economic and Development Authority) which contains published journals and other reading materials from other government agencies.

College of Tourism, Hospitality and Transportation Management Library

The CTHTM Library is located on the second floor of the PUP Hasmin Hostel Building at M. H. del Pilar Campus, R. Magsaysay Blvd., Sta. Mesa, Manila. Its collections consist of books and other library materials to support the curricular needs of students taking up courses on Tourism, Hospitality and Transportation Management.

College of Engineering and Architecture Library

The CEA Library is housed on the fourth floor of the College of Engineering and College of Architecture and Fine Arts Building at the NDC Compound, PUP, Anonas St., Sta. Mesa, Manila. Its collections consist mostly of engineering and architecture books and periodicals for the use of engineering, architecture and fine arts students.

College of Communication Library

This satellite library is on the second floor of the College of Communication Building, also at the NDC Compound, PUP, Anonas St., Sta. Mesa, Manila. Its collections include mostly books and other library materials related to the curricular offerings of the college.

College of Law Library

The College of Law Library is housed on the ground floor of the Ninoy Aquino Library and Learning Resources Center Building, Mabini Campus, Sta. Mesa, Manila. Its collections consist mostly of law books and journals for the use of law students.

Laboratory High School Library

Operating on an open-shelf system, the Laboratory High School Library is housed at the Laboratory High School Building Mabini Campus, PUP, Sta. Mesa, Manila. The collection is intended for high school students.

Institute of Technology

The IT library is the newest satellite library. It can be found on the 3rd floor of the Institute of Technology building which is located at the NDC compound where the old Antique house is situated.

=== Multimedia Services ===
The Multimedia Service provides the PUP community with audio-visual facilities to meet their media instructions and other related activities. Venues are available to cater to various activities of PUP such as conferences, conventions, convocations, meetings, assemblies, fora, social and cultural presentations, seminars, orientation and other instruction-related services like film showing, video production and documentation, and others.

All users are accommodated on a first-come-first-served basis. Outside users can also avail the use of the facilities and equipment by arrangement, reservation, and payment of corresponding fee.

Silid Pulungan/Lakandayang (NALLRC Board Room)

The Silid Pulungan/Silid Lakandayang is a venue for meetings, oral defense, small and intimate concert/social gatherings and programs and the likes.

Multimedia Center

Known as MMC, it is located on the fourth floor of the building. It is a venue for small to medium group of attendees for forum, conferences, meetings, and the like.

Film Viewing Room

The FVR is also located at the fourth floor of the building (right wing, last room on the left side of the hall). Classes which would like to hold film showing and the like are entitled to use the room. Reservations are also on a first-come-first-served basis, upon approval of use.
