= Human rainbow =

Rainbow pattern formed by people

A human rainbow is where a group of people form a pattern on the ground by placing themselves in the typical characteristics of a rainbow. For example, wearing the colours red, orange, yellow, green, blue, indigo, violet and forming a rainbow arch at the same time. Some human rainbows are formed in celebration of anniversaries and for charitable purposes. These human rainbows usually involve a large number of people participating and this has resulted in world records being broken. These records are officially recognised by the Guinness World Records.

== Records ==
- In 1997, 6,444 people formed a human rainbow at Transco Tower Park, Houston, Texas, United States.
- On October 6, 2002, 11,273 Hong Kong Polytechnic University staff, students, alumni, friends and families united together and set a new world record. All wearing T-shirts and caps in seven rainbow colours, they formed the largest Human Rainbow in the world. This historic event, held in celebration of Hong Kong Polytechnic University 65th anniversary, aimed to raise fund for the University, the Children's Cancer Foundation and The Hong Kong Society for the Aged.
- On November 15, 2003, 11,750 individuals assembled in Floriana, Malta to break the record. The Prime Minister of Malta, Eddie Fenech Adami and members of the opposition also joined in. The money which was raised from the participants went to 23 different charity institutions.
- On September 18, 2004, over 31,000 students, faculty, staff and alumni of the Polytechnic University of the Philippines broke the record previously held by the Maltese. They used the human rainbow to celebrate the university's centennial, which was from 1904 to 2004, and to highlight the signing of the Declaration of Peace which will be submitted to the United Nations.

== See also ==
- Human chain
