= Polytechnic University of the Philippines College of Law =

Law school

- Motto: Eximius Academicus
- Type: Public
- Established: May 25, 2001
- Parent institution: Polytechnic University of the Philippines – Sta. Mesa, Manila
- Affiliations: Philippine Association of Law Schools
- Dean: Dean Gemy Lito L. Festin, LL.B., LL.M.
- Location: Manila, Philippines
- Website: www.pup.edu.ph/CL
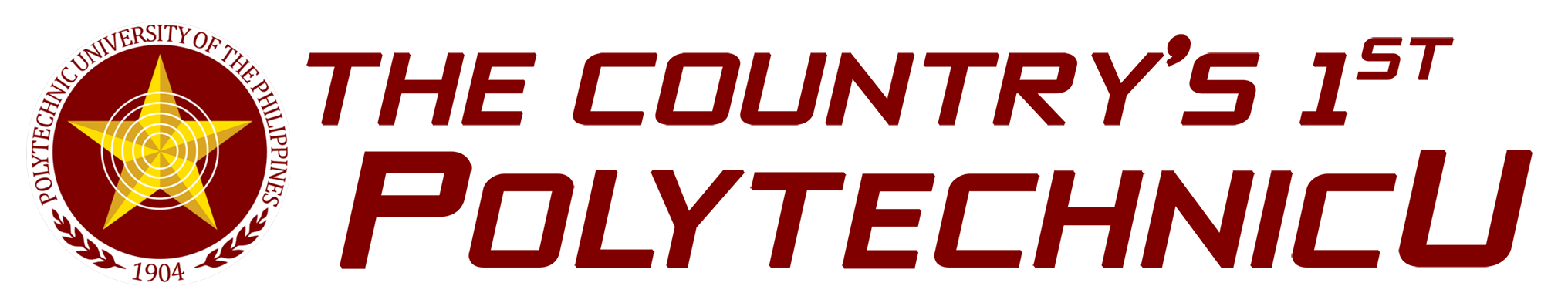

The Polytechnic University of the Philippines College of Law, abbreviated as PUPCOL, is the law school of the Polytechnic University of the Philippines located in Manila, Philippines that was established in 2001. It ranks as one of the top law schools in the country in terms of percentile passing rate in the bar examination.

== Admission ==
Interested applicants who wish to study in the PUP College of Law must pass the PUP College of Law Entrance Examination (PUPCLEE). Furthermore, the applicant must be a graduate of a bachelor's degree and must pass the Dean's interview.

== History ==
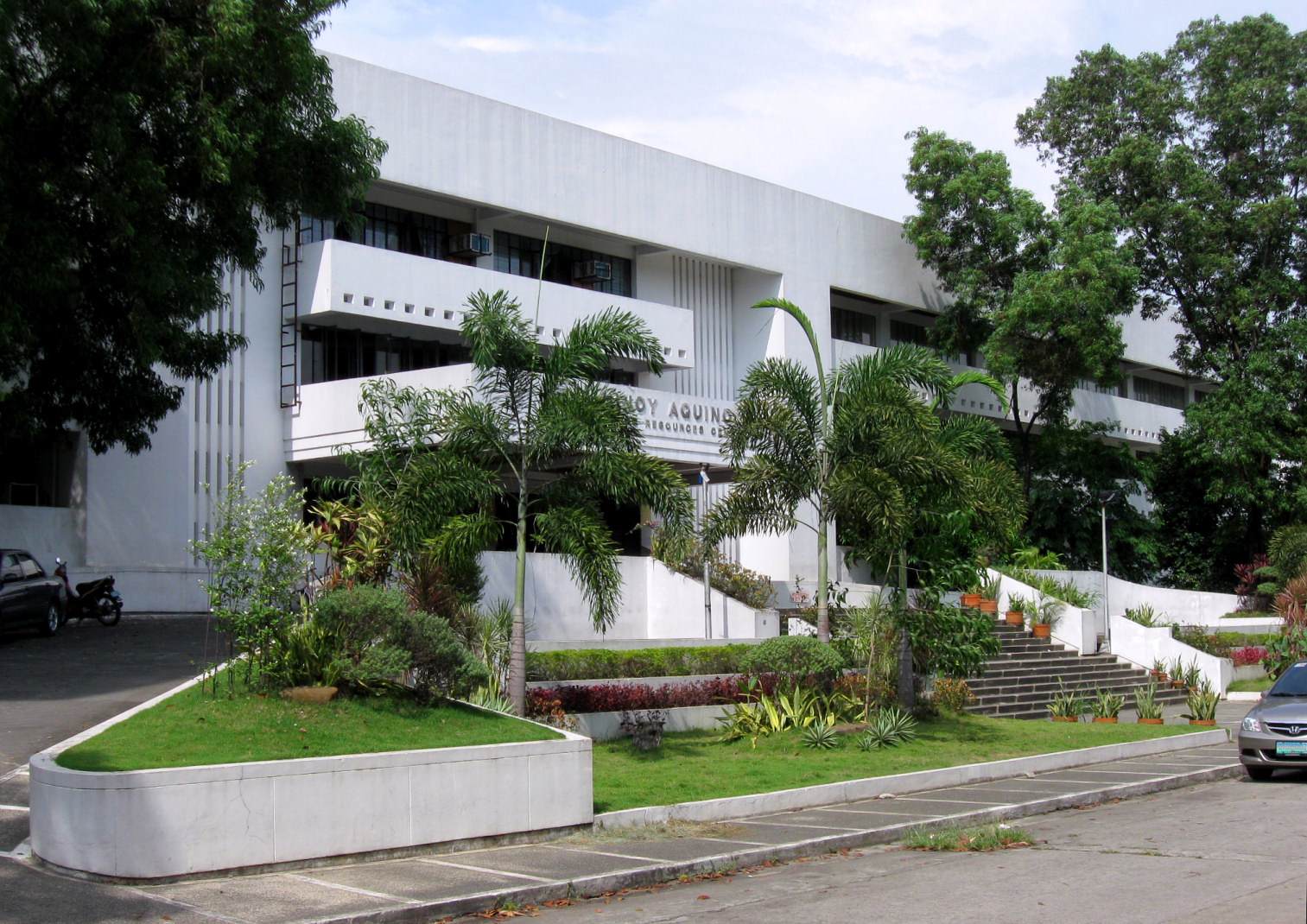
The PUP College of Law is located at the NALLRC building.

In January 2001, the plans for the establishment of the Polytechnic University of the Philippines College of Law started when the then University President Dr. Ofelia M. Carague instructed the Dean of the College of Accountancy and Law to prepare a proposal for the establishment of the said college. In the early part of May 2001, a meeting was held between the Vice President for Academic Affairs, the Dean of the College of Accountancy and Law and the Chairperson of the Department of Law to finalize the proposal to approve the establishment of the PUP College of Law. It was on May 25, 2001 when the PUP Board of Regents approved Resolution No. 115, Series of 2001, also known as "Resolution Approving the Establishment of the College of Law." Former Supreme Court Associate Justice Dante Tiñga served as its first dean.

In 2013, the PUP is one of the first law schools in the Philippines which offered a Juris Doctor program. This was before the Legal Education Board uniformed the Bachelor of Laws degree to Juris Doctor degree in 2018.

The 2016 Bar Examination marks the first breakthrough in the PUPCOL history. For the first time, all 25 bar candidates, including 9 out of 9 PUPCOL students who took the Bar Examination for the first time secured a passing rate of 100%. Likewise, a passing rate of 100% in the subject of Criminal law was also recorded. Because of these numbers, the University posted a high passing percentage of 83.33% surpassing the national passing rate of 59.06%. The Legal Education Board awarded the PUP with a plaque, recognizing it as the top performing school in the Philippines and NCR in terms of first takers. The bar chairperson, Supreme Court Associate Justice Presbitero Velasco Jr. personally attended the thanksgiving party of the College on June 6, 2017.

In 2016, the college celebrated its 15th anniversary; a lecture series was organized by the college and was attended by hundreds of students, faculty members and employees. Past accomplishments were also mentioned by the College Dean Gemy Lito L. Festin such as the college's performance in the bar examinations and the establishment of the Office of the Legal Aid.

== Achievements ==
The PUP College of Law is one of the top law schools in the country in terms of passing rate in the Philippine Bar Examination. In the 2016 Bar Examination results released by the Supreme Court on May 3, 2017, 100% of the first time takers from the college passed the bar exam, and 76.19% of the retakers from the college successfully passed the said exam. This gives the university a high passing rate of 83.33 percent, surpassing the 2016 national passing rate of 59.06 percent.

In 2019, the PUP College of Law produced its first topnotcher, Atty. Jun Dexter Rojas, who ranked 9th in the 2019 Bar Examinations.

PUP COL’s performance in the recent five bar examinations is consistent, being ranked among the top 5 performing law schools. In 2020-2021 Bar, PUP COL ranked 3rd in the category of law school with 11 to 50 candidates, with an impressive 88% passing rate, ten of whom are exemplary passers.

PUP COL again ranked 3rd in the 2022 Bar Examinations for the category with 11 to 50 candidates for first-time takers, with an exemplary 93.10 passing rate.

In 2023, PUP COL secured the 5th rank in the same category of 11 to 50 candidates for first takers, with 86.67% passing rate, and ranked 1st in the category of law schools with 50 to 100 candidates for all takers, with a 75.86% passing rate.

In 2024, PUP COL ranked 1st in the category of law schools with 51 to 100 candidates for first-time takers, with 88.52 % passing rate, and ranked 3rd in the category of law schools with 51 to 100 candidates for all takers, with 75.95% passing rate. In the same year, the Legal Education Board recognized PUP COL’s achievement placing 6th among the Top Performing Legal Education Institutions (Overall-Upper Cluster) in the 2024 Bar Examination.

In the recently concluded 2025 Bar Exam, PUPCOL ranked 3rd in the category of law schools with 51 to 100 first-time examinees, with 94.20% passing rate – marking it as the second highest passing rate since 2016, which obtained 100% for first-time takers. It also ranked 2nd in the category of 51 to 100 candidates for all takers, with 89.89% passing rate.

== Organizations ==
The college also has various student organizations actively participating in wide-variety of intercollegiate activities of law schools around the country, including CODAL (Christians on Demand at Law), PUP Law Moot Court Society, PUP Legal Aid Clinic, and The Solicitor, their official student publication.

In 2016, PUP Law Moot Court Society secured a championship place in a debate cup on International Humanitarian Law organized by the House of Representatives and the Philippine Red Cross.
