= Polytechnic University of the Philippines Laboratory High School =

Public high school in Manila, Philippines

- Sanayang Mataas na Paaralan ng Politeknikong Unibersidad ng Pilipinas (Filipino)

Location
- Manila, Metro Manila; Philippines; 14°35′50″N 121°0′39″E

Information
- Type: commercial, state, laboratory school
- Motto: Discipline, Academic Excellence, Nationalism
- Established: 1954
- President: Manuel Muhi
- Dean: Junithesmer Rosales
- Principal: Christine Del Rosario
- Chaplain: Rev. Fr. Stephen Misud
- Faculty: 13
- Grades: 7 to 10
- Enrollment: 541
- Campus: Urban
- Colors: Maroon and Gold
- Athletics: Basketball, Volleyball, Badminton, and Chess
- NCAE average: 635.87
- Yearbook: Junior Memorabilla
- Website: www.pup.edu.ph/lhs

The Polytechnic University of the Philippines Laboratory High School (Filipino: Sanayang Mataas na Paaralan ng Politeknikong Unibersidad ng Pilipinas), abbreviated as PUPLHS, is the laboratory school of the Polytechnic University of the Philippines College of Education located in PUP Mabini Campus, Sta. Mesa, Manila. It was established in 1954 as the Philippine College of Commerce High School offering commercial courses, and is the first high school to offer commercial curriculum in the Philippines. The school has a student population of 541 in 2015.

== History ==
Upon the conversion of PSC into the Philippine College of Commerce in 1952, talks about a commercial high school for the Faculty of Secretarial and Business Education (now College of Education) started. In November 1954, a business high school curriculum to be implemented the following school year was prepared by PCC president Luis F. Reyes and was immediately approved by the Board of Regents.

On January 3, 1955, the Philippine College of Commerce High School started its operations at the PCC S.H. Loyola campus in Sampaloc, Manila. All students were required to take stockkeeping, general and retail merchandising, and secretarial courses. However, in June 1963, the curriculum was revised to improve areas of social, physical, and biological sciences. Students were grouped into 3 sections (Bookkeeping, Salesmanship, Stenography) which take respective classes since then.

When PCC transferred to its new campus in Santa Mesa, the school followed suit. It continued its operations there until present time.

The school adopted the K-12 educational system in 2012, which includes the new curricula of all schools. PUPLHS underwent a revision in its curriculum following its adoption of the K-12 program. In 2015, President Emanuel De Guzman announced that the senior high school program in the PUPLHS will be separated from the senior high school to be offered by the university starting in 2016.

Recently, PUPLHS ranks 2nd place, after the Manila Science High School in recently concluded National Achievement Test in Manila.

== Campus ==
Since the 1970s the school has been operating in its current compound located within the Mabini Campus of PUP. At the western part of the Mabini Campus of PUP Manila lies the PUP Laboratory High School, occupying a small parcel of land and is composed of four buildings. The buildings contain 15 lecture rooms, 4 laboratory rooms, a multi-purpose hall, and other offices utilized by the school administration. Trees and gardens surround the compound itself.

In celebration of the school's 60th foundation anniversary in 2014, the university's Physical Planning and Development Office proposed a new building for the school. The proposed building consists of two wings which houses 15 classrooms, 4 laboratories, function rooms, administrative offices, a library, and rooms for the organization. The administration already pledged P10 million as a startup fund for the project.

== Academics ==
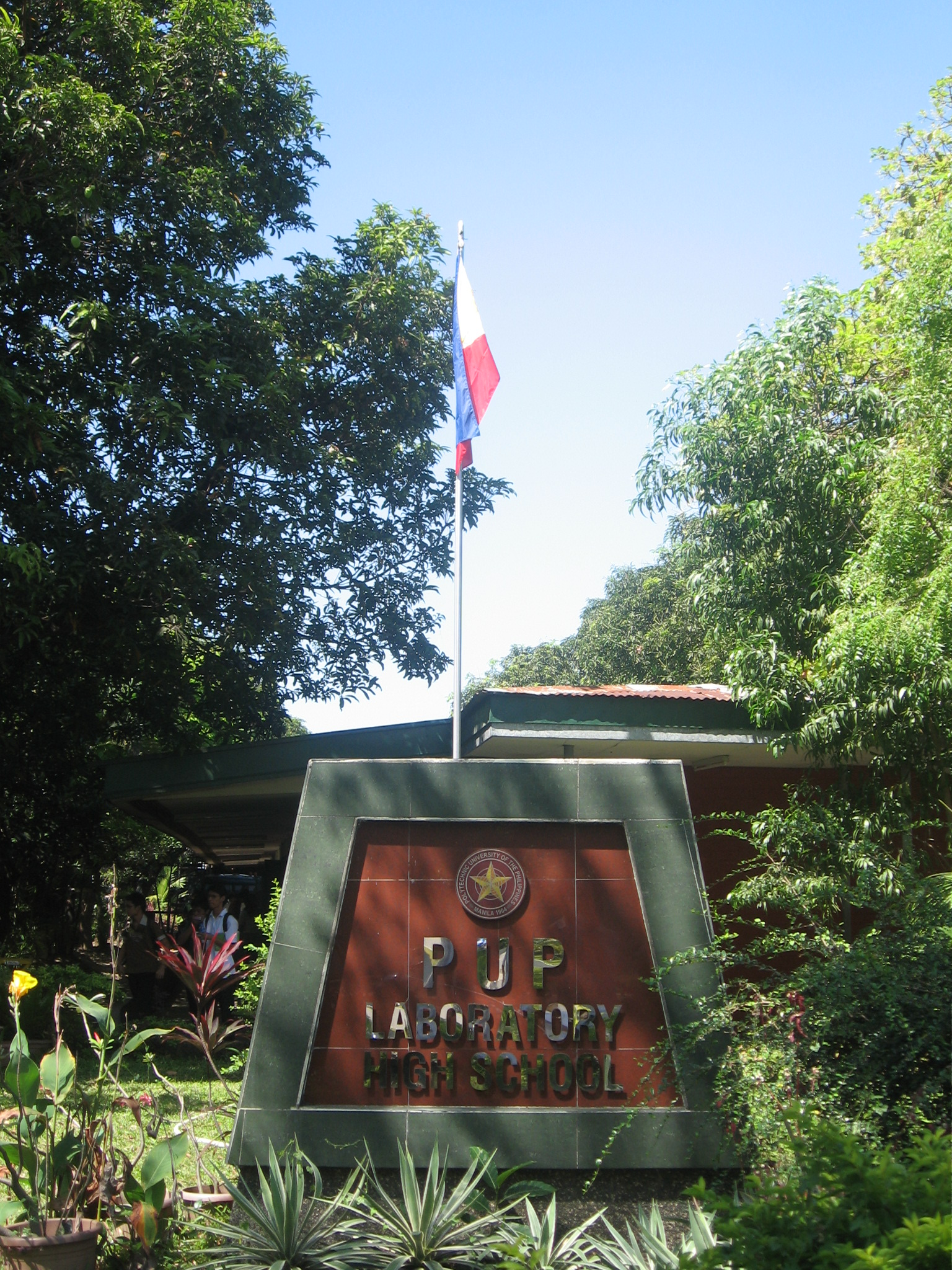
The front of PUP Laboratory High School with the Philippine Flag in the foreground

Admission to PUPLHS requires passing the PUP Laboratory High School Entrance Exam (LHSEE). In case a student doesn't want to enter the school, students from the waiting list are selected to fill up the 150 slots available for Grade 7. Each year level is composed of 3 sections with 50 students or less in each section and is grouped according to the results of a psychological examination.

The sections of the PUPLHS are:

- Grade 7 (PUP): Peace, Unity, and Prosperity
- Grade 8 (LHS): Loyalty, Honesty, and Sincerity
- Grade 9: Bookkeeping, Entrepreneurship, and Office Technology
- Grade 10: Bookkeeping, Entrepreneurship, and Office Technology

=== Curriculum ===
The current curriculum of PUPLHS roots from the secondary courses offered by the Philippine School of Commerce (now PUP). It follows the K-12 educational system and emphasizes business and management programs, such as Accountancy, Business Administration, and Office Administration. Upon reaching the 9th Grade, students are grouped according to their abilities and grades in Bookkeeping as Section 1, Entrepreneurship as Section 2, and Office Technology as Section 3.

== Student life ==
=== Student organizations ===
PUPLHS has 16 organizations, clubs, and teams that covers the students' wide range of interests. The Student Central Organization (SCO) is the official governing student body and acts as the coordinating body for all student organizations.

The PCC-PUPLHS Alumni Association, Inc. (PCC-PUPLHSAAI) is the official alumni association of PUPLHS. It oversees various activities for alumni such as class reunions, local gatherings, alumni travel, and career services. It offers student scholarships and also coordinates in different school programs.

=== Publications ===
The former wordmark and logo of Buklod Diwa

Buklod Diwa (BD) is the official publication of PUPLHS. It started in the 1950s as Trumpet, an English newsletter, and was later renamed as the Junior Businessman in School Year 1974–1975, after the college level's publication Businessman. It was renamed Buklod Diwa in School Year 1976–1977.

The Junior Memorabilia is the official yearbook of PUPLHS. It started in 1966 and was named after the college level's yearbook, Memorabilia.

=== Performing Arts ===
The PUPLHS Chorale is one of the chorale groups in the university. Since its organization in 2003, it has won several awards from different local, national and international choir competitions, including the grand prize in the Philippine Travel Mart Eco Chorale Competition High School Division last September 5, 2010; Gold diploma and 2nd prize in the 1st Vietnam International Choir Festival and Competition held in Hoi An, Quang Nam, Vietnam last March 14, 2011 for the Mixed Youth Choir category; and two silver certifricates in the 4th Voyage of Songs International Chorale Festival held in Penang, Malaysia last July 4–8, 2009; Gold Diploma in the 1st Guam Pacific Choral Festival at Hagatna, Guam last May 1–5, 2012, among others. It is now part of a larger group, the PUPLHS Music Collective.

The Banda Kawayan is a bamboo orchestra organized in 1973. It regularly performs during school programs and also for diplomats and tourists in various functions in the Malacañan Palace, the Department of Tourism, the Philippine Convention and Visitors Corporation known now as Tourism Promotions Board, the Cultural Center of the Philippines and other public and private institutions. It is now called as Banda Kawayan Pilipinas.

Entablado Performing Group, better known as "Entablado" or "Enta", is the performing arts guild of PUPLHS. It has performed on several university-wide events.

Compaña de Danza is the official dance team of the school. The team had already performed and competed in several SUC competitions.

PUPLHS Drum and Lyre Band, better known as "DAL", is the performing and marching band of the PUPLHS. It is composed of drummers (snare, bass, and quad), lyrists, cymbalists, majorettes and color guards. It regularly performs for the university parades and different college programs.

PUPLHS Oratorical and Debate Society, better known as "ODS", it is the debating team of PUPLHS. It joined various inter-collegiate and inter-school debating competitions. They host Oratorical and Debate competitions and training that they use to spread awareness and confidence in public speaking.

=== Athletics ===
The school has several varsity teams and sport clubs participating in different sports competitions, most notably badminton, basketball, volleyball, swimming, and chess. The PUPLHS Basketball, Volleyball and Swimming teams compete in the university intramurals held in line with the celebration of the university's anniversary.

Aside from the University Intramurals, the school also holds an annual sports festival for major sports at the end of the school year.

== Notable people ==
LHS students, faculty members, or administrators, are known as "LHSians". Throughout the school's history, faculty, alumni, and the students have played prominent roles in many different fields.

=== Alumni and faculty ===
PUPLHS has produced alumni distinguished in their respective fields. Among the well-known people who have attended the school are Filipino government officials Securities and Exchange Commission Commissioner Antonieta Fortuna-Ibe, and Former Undersecretary Celia Capadoccia Yango. Businessmen Noel Gonzales, Reynaldo Garcia, Joey Bermudez also attended the school. Multi-awarded Social Advocate Jo Enrica Enriquez-Rosales, Magno-Humphries Drug Manufacturing Company founder Thelma Magno-Humphries, TV and movie director Lamberto De Leon and Banco de Oro Vice President for Informational Technology Rolino Bucao Jr. are graduates of the school. Prominent educators who have attended the university include Eusebia Delos Reyes Talastas and PUP Open University director Carmencita Castolo.

Notable people who have taught in the school include Palanca Awardee for Literature and Poetry Luwalhati Alvero-Kendrick.
