= Polytechnic University of the Philippines College Entrance Test =

The Polytechnic University of the Philippines College Entrance Test, commonly known as PUPCET, is part of the admission requirements in the Polytechnic University of the Philippines, administered to graduates of Philippine and foreign high schools. It is used to measure the capability of incoming students depending on what degree will the applicant choose. PUPCET, especially for admission to its main campuses in Manila, is one of the most extremely competitive entrance examinations in the Philippines. Of an estimated 120,000 annual entrance test examinees for the main campus in Manila, only around 12-16% will be accepted due to the university's limited budget. Due to COVID restrictions, from 2021 to 2023, the University temporarily suspended the regular admission process and implements the College Admission Evaluation of Polytechnic University of the Philippines or CAEPUP which evaluates the High School Grades of applicants.

== CAEPUP ==
The Polytechnic University of the Philippines announced that the yearly PUPCET's canceled due to ongoing COVID-19 pandemic for academic year 2021–2022, 2022–2023 and 2023–2024 instead the admission in Polytechnic University of the Philippines both Open University and Institute of Technology are based in College Evaluation of PUP or CAEPUP that evaluated through their iApply website.

== Eligibility and application to the PUPCET ==
Individuals that are considered eligible for the PUPCET should be any one of the following:

1. Graduating high school students of the current school year.
2. High school graduates who have not enrolled in any technical/diploma/degree program immediately after high school graduation.
3. A Philippine Educational Placement Test (PEPT) passer, eligible for admission to college with an average rating of 82 or higher in its five subject areas: Mathematics, Science, Communication Arts (English or Filipino), and Araling Panlipunan.
4. An Alternative Learning System Accreditation & Equivalency (ALS A & E) Test for Secondary Level passer, eligible for admission to college and has 100 or higher Standard Score (SS) and an essay writing proficiency level of 2 or higher.

Applicant is allowed to apply and take the PUPCET in only one campus and only once this school year. Double application will make the applicant's PUPCET result null and void.

In addition, graduates must not have taken and must not be taking any college subjects.

=== Entrance scholars ===
PUP also offers entrance scholarships to deserving and talented high school graduates who have not yet enrolled in any college degree program and who have shown exemplary performance in academics and extra-curricular activities. An applicant for entrance scholarship may not take the PUPCET but has to pass the PUP Scholastic Aptitude and Interest Test (PUPSAIT).

=== PUP Laboratory High School graduates ===
For a PUP Laboratory High School graduate, there is a privilege given that one may apply to the university without taking the PUPCET but he must have a high school general weighted average of at least 85%. However the final admission and enrollment is still subject to compliance with the admission credentials required for an incoming freshman in a college degree he wants to pursue.

== Where to apply ==
All PUPCET applicants must apply online, using PUP's iApply website. An applicant is only allowed to apply and take the PUPCET on one campus, and only once in an academic year.

== Results ==
=== PUPCET ===
The applications for PUPCET, for Main Campus normally happens every November of the previous year. Examinations are held in Batches starting from January up until March. The results of PUPCET normally released between the Months of May to June. For other PUP Campuses, applications normally happens from January to April with examinations held from February to June, and results are released starting from April until Early August. Each campus has an allotted specific date to show the list of its successful examinees. Confirmation of their slot and schedule of their application is done through the university's website, and failure to confirm their slot may result in the cancellation of their admission to the university. Classes in PUP starts in Late August or Early September.

=== CAEPUP ===
Since the implementation of CAEPUP, the evaluation of college application can be viewed through iapply website by logging in for slot confirmation and downloading of forms.
