= Banda Kawayan Pilipinas =

Background information
- Also known as: BKP
- Origin: Manila, Philippines
- Genres: Classical, folk, OPM, pop, jazz, international
- Instrument(s): Marimba, angklung, panpipes, bumbong, kalagong, kalamor, kalabong, kiskis, drums
- Years active: 1973–present
- Members: Various musicians
- Website: Official website

Banda Kawayan Pilipinas is an orchestra based in the Philippines that uses musical instruments made from bamboo and other indigenous materials. It was established as a bamboo orchestra of Philippine College of Commerce High School (now Polytechnic University of the Philippines Laboratory High School) in 1973 by former PCCHS principal Gloria R. Talastas and faculty member Prof. Siegfredo B. Calabig. It was known as PUP Banda Kawayan and was under the Polytechnic University of the Philippines University Center for Culture and the Arts until it separated itself from the university in 2014.
