= PUP Centennial Year =

The Polytechnic University of the Philippines Centennial Year is a yearlong celebration in 2004 celebrating the centenary of the establishment of the Polytechnic University of the Philippines. It was celebrated throughout the system. Colleges and other schools have celebrated their anniversaries in accordance to theme of the Centennial Year: "PUP: Kabalikat sa Pag-aangat ng Antas ng Buhay ng Mamamayan".

The year 2004 was proclaimed as the "PUP Centennial Year" in 2003 by President Gloria Macapagal Arroyo.

== Pre-Centennial ==
=== 1999 ===
- The official countdown to the university's centenary was launched in the program Ugnayan held at Hotel Rembrant on October 1, 1990, in cooperation with the Philippine Information Agency.

=== 2001 ===
- The Centennial Logo was unveiled during the celebration of 97th Foundation Anniversary at the PUP Mabini Campus. The logo was used in all documents during the centennial year. A marker bearing the Centennial Logo was placed in front of the Main Academic Building and was later moved to its present position at the Luntiang Pilipinas Forest Park.

== Centennial Year ==
- Centennial Souvenir Shop was opened on July 12.
- Consisting of 30,365 students, faculty, staff and alumni, PUP made the world's largest human rainbow on September 18, 2004, at the Rizal Park. The Centenary Intramurals was commenced on the same day with the lighting of torch.
- On October 12, the Grand Centennial Night was held at the Manila Hotel with former Vice President Noli De Castro as Guest of Honor.
- Ground-breaking ceremonies for the Diosdado P. Magapagal Law Center (College of Law Building) at Lepanto was held in October 16.
