= PUPLHS Chorale =

Major musical group

Polytechnic University of the Philippines Laboratory High School Chorale
- Also known as: PUPLHS Chorale
- Origin: Manila, Philippines
- Genres: Choral music
- Years active: 2003–present
- Members: Prof. Kris Bartolome (choirmaster, 2014-present)
- Website: Official website

The PUPLHS Chorale is one of the major performing musical groups based in the Polytechnic University of the Philippines. PUPLHS Chorale is the resident choir of the PUP Laboratory High School. Started in 2003, it is now part of a larger group, the PUPLHS Music Collective.

The PUPLHS Chorale has won numerous accolades and citations, locally and internationally, including diplomas from the 4th Voyage of Songs International Chorale Festival and 1st Vietnam International Choir Festival and Competition.

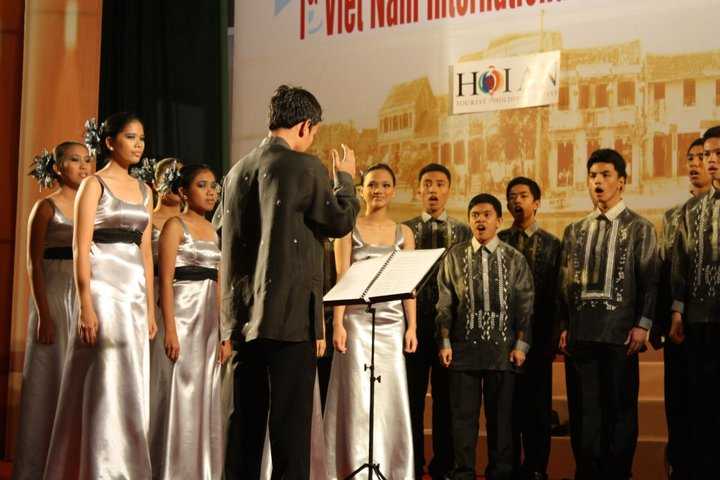
Performance at the 1st Vietnam Choral Festival

== History ==
The Polytechnic University of the Philippines Laboratory High School Chorale was formally established in 2003 by a PNU graduate, Mr. Jonathan A. Jarin. The group sang for the monthly catholic masses at the PUP Interfaith Chapel and the school's programs until they joined Rotary Club of Makati's “Touch Another Filipino Soul” District Youth Choral Competition in 2005. They won 3rd place in the said competition.

Engagements followed their first success in local competitions. In 2007, they were 2nd runner-up in the Philippine School of Business Administration's “Isang Himig, Isang Tinig” competition and 1st Runner Up in Philippine Tour Operators Association's 20th Philippine Travel Mart Eco Chorale Competition. In 2010, they joined Eat Bulaga “Sa Pula, Sa Puti” and Philippine Travel Mart Eco Chorale Competition's High School Division and got the first place prize in both contests. In the same year, they also joined Pasig's “Paskong Himig” and placed 3rd, defeating other university and high school choirs. The chorale competed in the Himig Handog Choral Competition in Tagum in February 2012 and placed third in the Youth Category.

PUPLHS Chorale also joined international choir festivals and won awards. In July 2009, the group earned Silver B Certificates in Folklore and Chamber Categories at the 4th “A Voyage of Songs” competition in Penang, Malaysia. They also won a Gold diploma from the 1st Vietnam International Choir Festival and Competition held in Hoi An, Quang Nam, Vietnam and placed second in Mixed Youth Choir Category. The group won the Youth Categorysilver medal and the Spiritual Category gold medal at the 1st Guam Pacific Choral Festival in May 2013. The choir also performs for Filipinos abroad whenever they join these competitions.

Due to their achievements, the chorale was invited to perform for different personalities and institutions, including Ms Lani Misalucha, President Benigno Simeon Aquino III and the Malacanan Palace, Department of Foreign Affairs, City of Calauan, Development Academy of the Philippines, Emilio Aguinaldo College, Young Men's Christian Association, Resorts World Manila, GO NEGOSYO!, ABS-CBN (Umagang Kay Ganda), GMA (Eat Bulaga, 24 Oras, Kapuso Mo, Jessica Soho, News To Go), TV5 (Sapul sa Singko) Solar News Channel and other media institutions. Then-first lady and now Calauan Mayor Baby Berries also invited the chorale to interpret their town hymn.

PUPLHS Chorale also showed devotion into helping others. The choir visited and sang for the Silong Tanglaw Orphanage in 2011. The group rendered songs for a Medical Mission and a Home for the Aged Outreach Program at Tagum City in 2013. To promote choral singing among the youth, the chorale also hosted two seminar-workshops in development of successful of choirs in 2012. Held in October and November, the choir taught the members of the Makati Science High School and Tanong High School Choirs. In 2013, the PUPLHS Chorale performed alongside other performing groups in a concert-for-a cause hosted by the university.

The chorale co-headlined the Voices II concert with PNU Chorale at PAGCOR Grand Theater in November 2011. In 2013, they celebrated their 10th founding anniversary at the Philam Life Theater with a concert entitled “Committed”.

Jarin resigned from his post as choirmaster and music teacher in 2014. Prof. Kris Bartolome took the post in August 2014.

== Awards and recognitions ==
=== 2005 ===
- Rotary Club of Makati's “Touch Another Filipino Soul” District Youth Choral Competition
  - Second Place

=== 2007 ===
- Philippine School of Business Administration's “Isang Himig, Isang Tinig” competition
  - Third Place

=== 2009 ===
- 4th Voyage of Songs International Choral Festival
  - Silver B Certificate Awardee, Folklore and Chamber Categories
- 20th Philippine Travel Mart Eco Chorale Competition
  - First Runner Up, High School division

=== 2010 ===
- Eat Bulaga's Sa Pula, Sa Puti
  - First Place
- 21st Philippine Travel Mart Eco Chorale Competition
  - First Place, High School division

=== 2011 ===
- 1st Vietnam International Choir Festival and Competition, Hoi An, Quang Nam, Vietnam
  - Second Place, Mixed Youth Category
  - Gold Diploma Awardee, Mixed Youth Category

=== 2012 ===
- Musikahan sa Tagum, Davao Del Norte
  - Third Place, Youth Category
  - Participant, Championship Round

=== 2013 ===
- 1st Guam Pacific Choral Festival, Guam, USA
  - Youth Category Silver Medal Category Winner
  - Spiritual Category Gold Medal

== Concerts ==
=== Headlining ===
- PUPLHS Chorale (2011)
- PUPLHS Chorale: Committed (2013)

=== Co-headlining ===
- Voices II (with PNU Chorale) [2010]
