= PUP Radicals =

PUP Mighty Maroons/Radicals
- School: Polytechnic University of the Philippines
- League: SCUAA, NAASCU, NCBL, Fr. Martin Cup | NCRAA
- Joined: SCUAA: 1953, NAASCU: 2013
- Location: Manila and other locations, Philippines
- Team colors: Royal Maroon and Gold

The PUP Radicals (formerly the PUP Mighty Maroons) are the athletic teams of Polytechnic University of the Philippines (PUP). The school's teams compete in NAASCU and SCUAA. The teams also have several intercollegiate varsity sports teams for women and men at the university.

In 2024, PUP disowned rumors of them joining the University Athletic Association of the Philippines (UAAP), saying while PUP is not a part of the UAAP, it was one of their goals to join.

== Notable alumni ==
- Jerwin Gaco - PBA player
- Christian Geronimo - Kia Picanto team draftee
- Arnold Rodriguez
