= University Center for Culture and the Arts =

Coordinates: 14.5978°N 121.0097°E

Polytechnic University of the Philippines University Center for Culture and the Arts
- Sentrong Pang-unibersidad para sa Kultura at mga Sining
- Abbreviation: UCCA
- Director: Bely R. Ygot
- Secretary: Arlene A. Sandel
- Theater Manager: Alfred R. Soliman
- Website: www.pup.edu.ph/studentservices/ucca/

The University Center for Culture and the Arts (UCCA) is a non-profit cultural center of the Polytechnic University of the Philippines. The agency is under the Office of the Vice President for Student Services. The UCCA is currently residing at the PUP Theater inside the PUP College of Communication compound.

The UCCA hosts various events inside and outside the university. On August 29, 2014, the Polytechnic University of the Philippines through UCCA conferred the 'Pambansang Artista Ng Mamamayan' award to Nora Aunor in the PUP Theater. The UCCA also spearheads the annual university Arts Month every February.

== History ==
Buklod Sining, a central cultural body, was organized in 1974. Under the cultural body were different cultural groups: Dulambuhay, Himig Lahi (a faculty choral group), Bagong Himig, Banda Kawayan, Rondalla, Brass Band, and the PCC Dance Troupe. The organization of Buklod Sining started the University Center for Culture and the Arts.

The Cultural Development Office (CDO) was included in the university structure during the University Reorganization Plan in 1976. The creation of CDO lead to the direction of cultural programs from a formal university unit. Objectives and programs were defined in the creation of the office.

With the issuance of the University President's Office Order No. 6, s. 1980, the Cultural Development Office was renamed to Office the University Center for Cultural Affairs (UCCA) on October 1, 1980. It was in 1987 that office was renamed to University Center for Culture and the Arts during the reorganization plan. Different cultural groups were also added under UCCA during that time. Since then, the office have undergone different renaming and reorganization over the past years.

== Cultural groups ==
The University Center for Culture and the Arts is composed of various cultural groups and organizations specializing on different crafts. The following groups and organizations are members of the UCCA.

Buklod Sining, formerly known as Guhit Sudlungan, is the official visual arts group under the University Center for Culture and the Arts, Polytechnic University of the Philippines. The group have won various competitions including the 2014 3D street painting contest organized by the Department of Environment and Natural Resources

Polysound is the official band of the University Center for Culture and the Arts, Polytechnic University of the Philippines composing of undergraduate students and university artists.

Maharlika Dance Artists is the official dance group of the university, performing myriad repertoires. The group aims to promote the significance of cultural performing arts from traditional to modern era.

PUP ICONS, formerly known as PUP Ramp Artists, is the official cultural promotions management group of the university.

PUP Bagong Himig-Serenata is the official chorale group of the university under the University Center for Culture and the Arts.

PUP Sining-Lahi Polyrepertory, also known as POLYREP, is the resident student theater organization of the Polytechnic University of the Philippines under the University Center for Culture and the Arts

PUP Harana String Co., formerly known as PUP Rondalla, is a string ensemble under the Polytechnic University of the Philippines – University Center for Culture and the Arts.

PUPIL Photography Club or PUP's iskong/iskang litratista is the official photography organization of PUP University Center for Culture and the Arts. It used to be known as PUP Lente Photo Club.
