= PUP Open University System =

Distance learning unit of the Polytechnic University of the Philippines

Polytechnic University of the Philippines Open University
- Type: Public research university Open university
- Established: 1990
- Affiliations: ICDE, AAOU, PSDL, APKBODL
- President: Manuel Muhi
- Director: Anna Ruby Gapasin (executive)
- Location: Manila, Philippines
- Campus: 9 physical and 1 virtual campuses
- Colors: Maroon and Gold
- Website: www.pup.edu.ph/ous
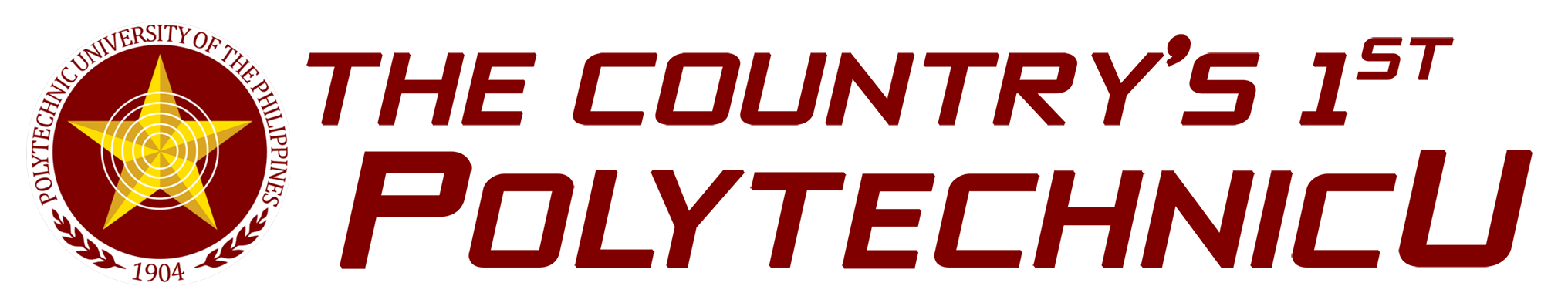

The Polytechnic University of the Philippines Open University System is the nontraditional/distance studies unit of the Polytechnic University of the Philippines. It began with the offering of non-degree (technical-vocational) courses in 1970s and was formally established in 1990, making it the first open learning institution in the country. It is one of the only two open learning institutions in the Philippines recognized by the UNESCO Asia Pacific Knowledge Base on Open and Distance Learning.

The PUP Open University was established to provide education opportunities to individuals aspiring for higher education and improved qualifications but were unable to take advantage of traditional modes of education because of personal and professional obligations. It is also known as the "Pamantasang Bayan," literally translating as "Nation's University" in Filipino.

The students under the PUP OU program are not required to physically attend classes in a traditional classroom setting, or set foot on the campus. Instead, they can get the education they want wherever it is most convenient and conducive on their educational activities.

== Academics ==
=== Institutes and center ===
PUP Open University consists of three units: Institute of Open and Distance Education/Transnational Education, Institute of Non-Traditional Studies Program and ETEEAP, and the Center of Professional and Continuing Studies, under which the Nontraditional Study Program and Expanded Tertiary Education Equivalency and Accreditation Program are under.

==== Institute of Open and Distance Education/Transnational Education ====
Institute of Open and Distance Education / Transnational Education allows students to learn independently with the guidance of a teacher or in an online classroom, students may interact with the teacher and other students while studying.

==== Institute of Non-Traditional Studies and ETEEAP ====
Institute of Non-traditional Studies and ETEEAP gives an opportunity to practitioners and executives to complete their college degrees or graduate programs and earn their diplomas without having to take a leave from the jobs.

==== Institute for Continuing and Professional Development ====
Institute for Continuing and Professional Development in collaboration with the Professional Regulations Commission, the Commission on Higher Education, and other government agencies provide courses to enhance an individual's knowledge and skills through integrated industry-based professional development experiences.

== Learning Centers ==
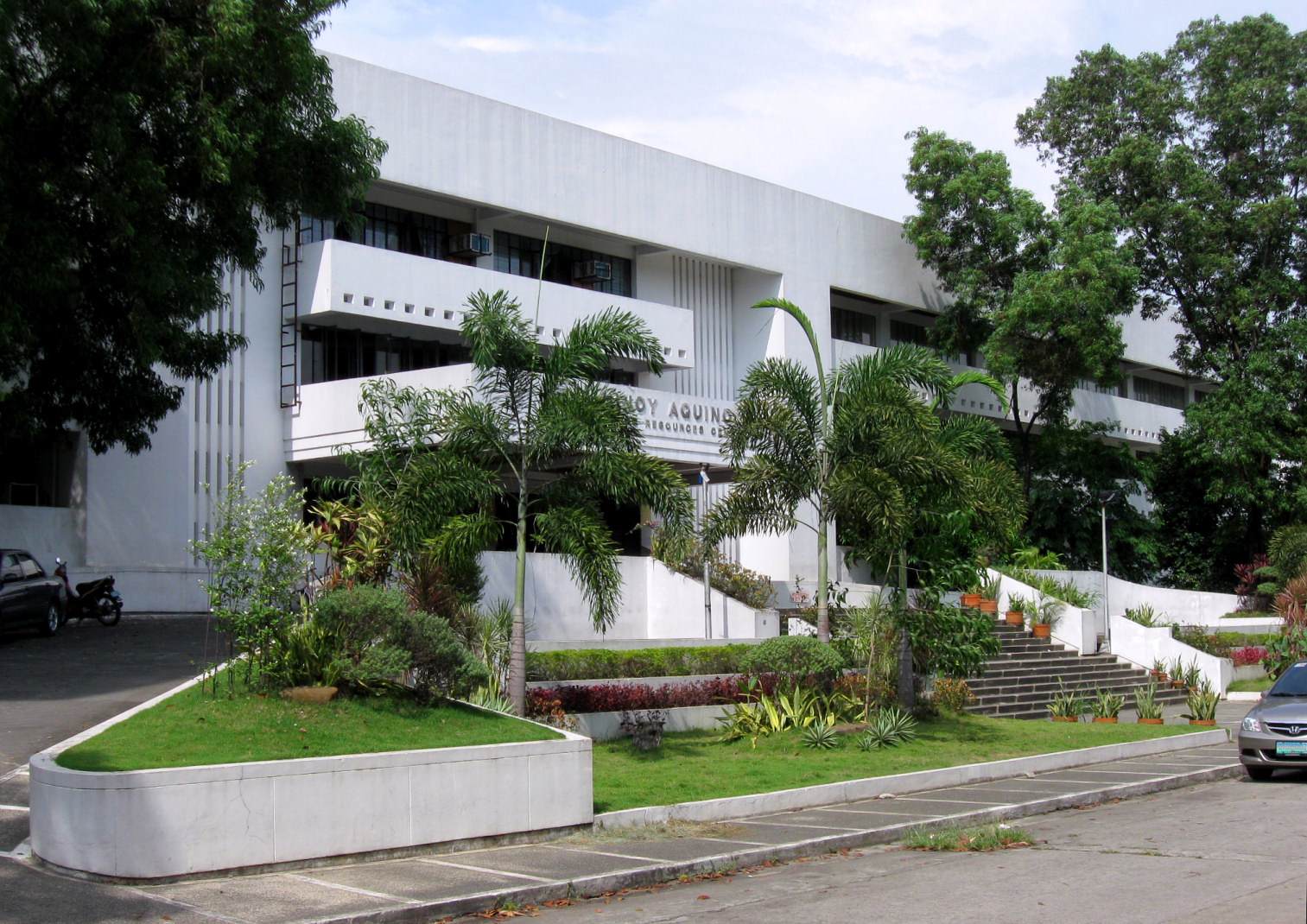
Ninoy Aquino Library and Learning Resources in the Mabini Campus, which houses the headquarters of the Open University

The PUP OU has 9 Learning Centers in strategic locations in the country. Most of the centers are mostly located in other PUP campuses in the selected regions of the country.

Learning Center	Director	Campus location
Manila	Dr. Carmencita L. Castolo	Ninoy Aquino Library and Learning Resources Center, PUP Mabini Campus, Sta. Mesa, Manila
Quezon City	Dir. Pascualito B. Gatan	PUP Quezon City, Commonwealth, Quezon City
Lopez	Dir. Rufo Bueza	PUP Lopez, Lopez, Quezon
Maragondon	Dir. Denise A. Abril	PUP Maragondon, Maragondon, Cavite
Sablayan	Dir. Laurence P. Usona	PUP Sablayan, Sablayan, Occidental Mindoro
Sta. Rosa	Dir. Charito A. Montemayor	PUP Sta. Rosa, New Sta. Rosa Village, Congco Subd., Tagapo, Sta. Rosa, Laguna
Sto. Tomas	Dir. Frederick O. Ramos	PUP Sto. Tomas, Sto. Tomas, Batangas
Taguig	Dir. Sharon Joy F. Pelayo	PUP Taguig, Lower Bicutan, Taguig, Metro Manila
Unisan	Dir. Edwin G. Malabuyoc	PUP Unisan, Ibabang Ilaya, Unisan, Quezon

In 2007, OU has launched the Open University Learning Management System (PUPOU-LMS or eMabini), where the faculty of the OU can hold classes online to Filipino students in United Arab Emirates, Hong Kong, Singapore, and Vietnam.
