= List of Alpha Phi Omega Philippines chapters =

Alpha Phi Omega Philippines is a service fraternity and sorority. It has chapters at colleges and universities throughout the Philippines. Alpha Phi Omega Philippines has aumni associations for those members who are no longer at colleges and universities.

== Administrative regions ==
Alpha Phi Omega chapters are divided into fourteen administrative regions with corresponding sections, as follows:

1. National Capital Administrative Region (NCAR)
2. Northern Luzon Administrative Region (NLAR)
3. Cavite, Laguna, Batangas, Rizal, Quezon Region (CALABARZON)
4. Bicol Administrative Region (BAR)
5. Northwestern Visayas Administrative Region (NVAR a.k.a. NWVAR)
6. Eastern Visayas Administrative Region (EVAR)
7. Northwestern Mindanao Administrative Region (NMAR a.k.a. NWMAR)
8. Southeastern Mindanao Administrative Region (SMAR a.k.a. SEMAR)
9. Administrative Region of North America (ARNA)
10. Administrative Region of Asia (ARA)
11. Administrative Region of the Pacific (ARP)
12. Administrative Region of Middle East (ARME)
13. Administrative Region of Europe (ARE)
14. Mindoro, Marinduquque, Romblon, Palawan Region (MIMAROPA)

The last five regions only include alumni associations.

== Collegiate chapters ==
In the following list, active chapters are indicated in bold and inactive chapters and institutions are in italics.

| Code | Chapter | Fraternity charter date | Sorority charter date | Institution | Location | Region | Status | Ref. |
|---|---|---|---|---|---|---|---|---|
| 0001 | **Alpha** | Mar 2, 1950 | Aug 15, 1974 | Far Eastern University | Sampaloc, Manila | NCAR | Active | (Note: The sorority was originally established as Sigma Gamma Phi in 1957.) |
| 0002 | **Beta** | Mar 24, 1951 | Oct 27, 1970 | National University | Sampaloc, Manila | NCAR | Active | (Note: The sorority was originally chartered as Sigma Lambda Sigma in 1955.) |
| 0003 | **Gamma** | Oct 5, 1953 | Mar 18, 1975 | Silliman University | Dumaguete | NVAR | Active | (Note: The sorority formed as Kappa Phi Omega in 1964.) |
| 0004 | **Delta** | Mar 5, 1952 | Oct 15, 1970 | Mapua Institute of Technology | Intramuros, Manila | NCAR | Active | (Note: The sorority was originally formed as Delta Sigma Sigma in 1955.) |
| 0005 | **Epsilon** | Mar 2, 1952 | Dec 15, 1971 | University of the East | Sampaloc, Manila | NCAR | Active | |
| 0006 | **Zeta** | Mar 28, 1952 | Apr 23, 2023 | STI West Negros University | Bacolod | NVAR | Active | |
| 0007 | **Eta** | Feb 9, 1953 | Oct 12, 1978 | University of the Philippines Diliman | Diliman, Quezon City | NCAR | Active | |
| 0008 | **Theta** | Feb 14, 1958 | Dec 14, 1971 | University of the Philippines Los Baños | Los Baños, Laguna | CALABARZON | Active | (Note: The sorority was originally established as Kappa Phi Omega in 1959.) |
| 0009 | **Iota** | Mar 2, 1960 | Jan 15, 1970 | PMI Colleges | Quiapo, Manila | NCAR | Active | (Note: Chapter formed at the Department of Customs Administration, now PMI.) |
| 0010 | **Kappa** | Mar 2, 1960 | not chartered | Guzman College of Science and Technology | Quiapo, Manila | NCAR | Active | |
| 0011 | **Lambda** | Feb 14, 1958 | Sep 27, 1971 | De La Salle Araneta University | Malabon | NCAR | Active | (Note: The sorority original formed as Alpha Lambda Sigma in 1963.) |
| 0012 | **Mu** | Mar 30, 1960 | May 14, 1971 | Manuel L. Quezon University | Quiapo, Manila | NCAR | Active | |
| 0013 | **Nu** | Nov 26, 1960 | Feb 5, 1972 | Manila Central University | Caloocan | NCAR | Active | |
| 0014 | **Xi** | Dec 8, 1960 | Jul 3, 1975 | Central Luzon State University | Nueva Ecija | NLAR | Active | |
| 0015 | **Omicron** | Feb 9, 1961 | Apr 7, 2001 | University of the Philippines Diliman - Extension Program in Pampanga | CAB, Angeles | NLAR | Active | |
| 0016 | **Pi** | Aug 23, 1961 | Oct 18, 1970 | University of Santo Tomas | Sampaloc, Manila | NCAR | Active | (Note: The sorority formed as Sigma Lambda Phi in 1967.) |
| 0017 | **Rho** | Nov 18, 1961 | Oct 27, 1970 | Central Colleges of the Philippines | Quezon City | NCAR | Active | |
| 0018 | **Sigma** | Feb 7, 1964 | Oct 9, 1969 | Adamson University | Ermita, Manila | NCAR | Active | (Note: The sorority formed as Sigma Lambda Phi in 1964.) |
| 0019 | **Tau** | Dec 14, 1964 | not chartered | University of Manila | Sampaloc, Manila | NCAR | Active | |
| 0020 | **Upsilon** | Feb 25, 1965 | not chartered | Philippine College of Criminology | Quiapo, Manila | NCAR | Active | |
| 0021 | **Phi** | May 9, 1965 | Apr 25, 2021 | Araullo University | Cabanatuan | NLAR | Active | |
| 0022 | **Chi** | Dec 9, 1965 | Mar 1, 1969 | Manuel S. Enverga University Foundation | Lucena | CALABARZON | Active | |
| 0023 | **Psi** | Dec 27, 1966 | Apr 15, 1970 | Centro Escolar University | San Miguel, Manila | NCAR | Active | |
| 0024 | **Omega** | Oct 23, 1965 | Oct 22, 1974 | FEATI University | Quiapo, Manila | NCAR | Active | |
| 0101 | **Alpha Alpha** | Dec 15, 1965 | Sep 9, 1969 | Trinity University of Asia | Quezon City | NCAR | Active | |
| 0102 | **Alpha Beta** | Apr 17, 1966 | not chartered | Cebu Institute of Technology – University | Cebu City | SEVAR | Active | |
| 0103 | **Alpha Gamma** | Mar 22, 1966 | Dec 14, 1970 | University of Pangasinan | Dagupan, Pangasinan | NLAR | Active | |
| 0104 | **Alpha Delta** | Apr 17, 1966 | Feb 7, 1988 | San Sebastian College - Recoletos | Quiapo, Manila | NCAR | Active | |
| 0105 | **Alpha Epsilon** | Jan 19, 1967 | Nov 14, 1968 | Technological University of the Philippines | Ermita, Manila | NCAR | Active | |
| 0106 | **Alpha Zeta** | Nov 16, 1966 | Jan 28, 1970 | Laguna College | San Pablo City, Laguna | CALABARZON | Active | |
| 0107 | **Alpha Eta** | Sep 2, 1968 | Sep 17, 1968 | Philippine School of Business Administration | Sampaloc, Manila | NCAR | Active | |
| 0108 | **Alpha Theta** | Nov 15, 1968 | Sep 6, 1969 | Lyceum of the Philippines | Intramuros, Manila | NCAR | Active | |
| 0109 | **Alpha Iota** | Mar 17, 1971 | not chartered | St. Peter's College, Iligan City | Iligan City | NMAR | Active | |
| 0110 | **Alpha Kappa** | May 12, 1967 | Aug 15, 1973 | Jamiatul Philippine Al-Islamia | Marawi City | NMAR | Active | |
| 0111 | **Alpha Lambda** | Dec 7, 1968 | Oct 1, 1969 | Technological Institute of the Philippines | Quiapo, Manila | NCAR | Active | |
| 0112 | **Alpha Mu** | Mar 25, 1969 | Jul 9, 1970 | University of San Carlos | Cebu City | SEVAR | Active | |
| 0113 | **Alpha Nu** | Jun 10, 1969 | Dec 18, 1971 | University of Nueva Caceres | Naga, Camarines Sur | BAR | Active | |
| 0114 | **Alpha Xi** | Jul 1, 1969 | Dec 17, 1971 | Velez College | Cebu City | SEVAR | Active | |
| 0115 | Alpha Omicron | Feb 7, 1970 | Apr 17, 1970 | Divine Word University of Tacloban | Tacloban City | SEVAR | Inactive | (Note: The sorority formed as Alpha Omega Sigma in 1966.) |
| 0116 | **Alpha Pi** | May 26, 1970 | May 26, 1970 | University of Luzon | Dagupan | NLAR | Active | |
| 0117 | **Alpha Rho** | Jan 11, 1971 | April 22, 2017 | Central Mindanao University | Maramag, Bukidnon | NMAR | Active | |
| 0118 | **Alpha Sigma** | Apr 14, 1971 | Apr 22, 1971 | San Pablo Colleges | San Pablo City, Laguna | CALABARZON | Active | |
| 0119 | **Alpha Tau** | Jul 16, 1970 | May 21, 1973 | Central Mindanao Colleges | Kidapawan City | SMAR | Active | |
| 0120 | **Alpha Upsilon** | Jan 8, 1971 | April 22, 2017 | University of San Jose - Recoletos | Cebu City | SEVAR | Active | |
| 0121 | **Alpha Phi** | Oct 5, 1970 | Apr 1, 1979 | University of the East - RMMMC | Quezon City | NCAR | Active | |
| 0122 | **Alpha Chi** | Oct 5, 1970 | not chartered | University of the Visayas | Cebu City | SEVAR | Active | |
| 0123 | **Alpha Psi** | Dec 21, 1970 | not chartered | University of Baguio | Baguio | NLAR | Active | |
| 0124 | **Alpha Omega** | Feb 27, 1971 | Sep 15, 1996 | Saint Mary's University | Bayombong, Nueva Vizcaya | NLAR | Active | |
| 0201 | **Beta Alpha** | Feb 27, 1971 | not chartered | National College of Business and Arts | Sampaloc, Manila | NCAR | Active | |
| 0202 | **Beta Beta** | Feb 27, 1971 | Jan 21, 1977 | University of Northeastern Philippines | Iriga City | BAR | Active | |
| 0203 | **Beta Gamma** | Mar 30, 1971 | Sep 24, 1976 | Southwestern University | Cebu City | SEVAR | Active | |
| 0204 | **Beta Delta** | Sep 26, 1971 | not chartered | Guagua National Colleges | Guagua, Pampanga | NLAR | Active | |
| 0205 | **Beta Epsilon** | Sep 26, 1971 | Feb 5, 1972 | De Ocampo Memorial College | San Miguel, Manila | NCAR | Active | |
| 0206 | **Beta Zeta** | Sep 26, 1971 | not chartered | Core Gateway College | San Jose City, Nueva Ecija | NLAR | Active | (Note: Chapter was formed at the Colleges of the Republic, now Core Gateway College.) |
| 0207 | Beta Eta | Oct 19, 1971 | April 14, 2019 | Southern Luzon Colleges | San Pablo City, Laguna | CALABARZON | Inactive | |
| 0208 | **Beta Theta** | Oct 26, 1971 | April 14, 1984 | University of Southern Mindanao | Kabacan, Cotabato | SMAR | Active | |
| 0209 | **Beta Iota** | Dec 17, 1971 | Apr 17, 1977 | Bulacan Agricultural State College | San Ildefonso, Bulacan | NLAR | Active | |
| 0210 | **Beta Kappa** | Dec 18, 1971 | Oct 23, 1976 | Ateneo de Naga University | Naga, Camarines Sur | BAR | Active | |
| 0211 | **Beta Lambda** | Nov 28, 1971 | May 22, 1993 | Divine Word College of Laoag | Laoag City | NLAR | Active | |
| 0212 | **Beta Mu** | Dec 17, 1971 | Jul 6, 1991 | Aldersgate College | Solano, Nueva Vizcaya | NLAR | Active | |
| 0213 | **Beta Nu** | Sep 15, 1973 | Dec 3, 1983 | Ateneo de Zamboanga University | Zamboanga City | ZPAR | Active | |
| 0214 | **Beta Xi** | Apr 15, 1973 | not chartered | Cagayan Colleges | Tuguegarao City, Cagayan | NLAR | Active | |
| 0215 | **Beta Omicron** | Sep 23, 1973 | Apr 1, 1979 | Mabini College | Daet, Camarines Norte | BAR | Active | |
| 0216 | **Beta Pi** | Sep 30, 1973 | Jan 17, 1976 | Baliuag University | Baliuag, Bulacan | NLAR | Active | |
| 0217 | **Beta Rho** | Dec 13, 1973 | Sep 2, 1976 | Notre Dame University | Cotabato City | SMAR | Active | |
| 0218 | **Beta Sigma** | Dec 13, 1973 | not chartered | San Beda College | Mendiola, Manila | NCAR | Active | |
| 0219 | **Beta Tau** | Aug 15, 1974 | Jan 23, 2022 | Arellano University | Sampaloc, Manila | NCAR | Active | |
| 0220 | **Beta Upsilon** | Aug 15, 1974 | Oct 3, 1976 | Mindanao State University | Marawi City | NMAR | Active | |
| 0221 | **Beta Phi** | Aug 15, 1974 | Feb 15, 1975 | University of Mindanao | Davao City | SMAR | Active | |
| 0222 | **Beta Chi** | Jan 11, 1975 | not chartered | Don Bosco Technical College | Mandaluyong | NCAR | Active | |
| 0223 | **Beta Psi** | Jan 25, 1975 | Sep 26, 1982 | Ateneo de Davao University | Davao City | SMAR | Active | |
| 0224 | **Beta Omega** | Dec 17, 1974 | Apr 1, 1979 | Xavier University – Ateneo de Cagayan | Cagayan de Oro | NMAR | Active | |
| 0301 | **Gamma Alpha** | Jan 25, 1975 | not chartered | Lanao Agricultural College | Lumbatan, Lanao del Sur | NMAR | Active | |
| 0302 | **Gamma Beta** | Jul 28, 1975 | not chartered | Northwestern University | Laoag City | NLAR | Active | |
| 0303 | **Gamma Gamma** | Jul 28, 1975 | Apr 6, 1976 | Misamis University | Ozamiz | NMAR | Active | |
| 0304 | **Gamma Delta** | Jul 28, 1975 | Feb 6, 1976 | Father Saturnino Urios University | Butuan | NMAR | Active | |
| 0305 | **Gamma Epsilon** | Nov 22, 1975 | Dec 28, 1981 | De La Salle University | Malate, Manila | NCAR | Active | |
| 0306 | **Gamma Zeta** | May 5, 1977 | not chartered | Universidad de Zamboanga | Zamboanga City | ZPAR | Active | |
| 0307 | Gamma Eta | Dec 11, 1975 | Sep 27, 1980 | Nueva Ecija University of Science and Technology | Cabanatuan | NLAR | Active | |
| 0308 | Gamma Theta | Jun 14, 1976 | Feb 7, 1988 | International Harvardian University | Davao City | SMAR | Inactive | |
| 0309 | **Gamma Iota** | Mar 3, 1976 | not chartered | Philippine Christian University | Ermita, Manila | NCAR | Active | |
| 0310 | **Gamma Kappa** | Nov 28, 1976 | not chartered | Ateneo de Manila University | Quezon City | NCAR | Active | |
| 0311 | **Gamma Lambda** | Mar 22, 1976 | November 8, 2020 | Roxas College | Roxas, Oriental Mindoro | MIMAROPA | Active | |
| 0312 | **Gamma Mu** | Nov 27, 1976 | Jul 8, 1984 | Saint Ferdinand College | Ilagan, Isabela | NLAR | Active | |
| 0313 | **Gamma Nu** | Mar 27, 1976 | Mar 27, 1976 | Naga College Foundation | Naga, Camarines Sur | BAR | Active | |
| 0314 | **Gamma Xi** | Mar 27, 1976 | Apr 1, 1979 | University of Santo Tomas–Legazpi | Legazpi, Albay | BAR | Active | |
| 0315 | **Gamma Omicron** | Jul 15, 1976 | Dec 15, 1985 | Bicol University | Legazpi, Albay | BAR | Active | |
| 0316 | **Gamma Pi** | Jul 3, 1976 | Oct 14, 1976 | University of the Philippines Baguio | Baguio | NLAR | Active | |
| 0317 | Gamma Rho | Jun 25, 1976 | not chartered | Ortañez University | Cubao, Quezon City | NCAR | Inactive | |
| 0318 | **Gamma Sigma** | Jul 13, 1976 | Mar 29, 1980 | Saint Louis University | Baguio | NLAR | Active | |
| 0319 | **Gamma Tau** | Aug 10, 1976 | not chartered | San Jose Colleges | San Jose City, Nueva Ecija | NLAR | Active | |
| 0320 | **Gamma Upsilon** | Aug 10, 1976 | not chartered | Pangarungan Islam College | Marawi City | NMAR | Active | |
| 0321 | Gamma Phi | Sep 2, 1976 | May 29, 1983 | Philippine Harvardian College | Cotabato City | SMAR | Inactive | |
| 0322 | **Gamma Chi** | Sep 2, 1976 | Sep 29, 1985 | Mindanao State University - Iligan Institute of Technology | Iligan City | NMAR | Active | |
| 0323 | **Gamma Psi** | Oct 2, 1976 | not chartered | University of the Cordilleras | Baguio | NLAR | Active | |
| 0324 | **Gamma Omega** | Oct 15, 1976 | Oct 15, 1976 | Sacred Heart College of Lucena City | Lucena | CALABARZON | Active | |
| 0401 | **Delta Alpha** | Oct 7, 1976 | not chartered | Rizal Technological University | Mandaluyong | NCAR | Active | |
| 0402 | **Delta Beta** | Oct 8, 1976 | Oct 12, 1976 | Emilio Aguinaldo College | San Andres, Manila | NCAR | Active | |
| 0403 | **Delta Gamma** | Oct 10, 1976 | not chartered | Pangasinan State University | Bayambang, Pangasinan | NLAR | Active | |
| 0404 | **Delta Delta** | Oct 23, 1976 | not chartered | Western Leyte Colleges | Ormoc City | SEVAR | Active | |
| 0405 | **Delta Epsilon** | Nov 25, 1976 | not chartered | Benguet State University | La Trinidad, Benguet | NLAR | Active | |
| 0406 | **Delta Zeta** | Dec 10, 1976 | not chartered | Las Piñas College | Las Piñas | NCAR | Active | |
| 0407 | **Delta Eta** | Dec 16, 1976 | not chartered | Jose Rizal University | Mandaluyong | NCAR | Active | |
| 0408 | **Delta Theta** | Dec 29, 1976 | Dec 28, 1981 | Southern Mindanao Colleges | Pagadian City | ZPAR | Active | |
| 0409 | **Delta Iota** | Nov 6, 1977 | Mar 31, 1979 | Bicol University - Tabaco | Tabaco City, Albay | BAR | Active | |
| 0410 | **Delta Kappa** | May 29, 1978 | Jun 26, 1988 | Adventist University of the Philippines | Silang, Cavite | CALABARZON | Active | |
| 0411 | **Delta Lambda** | May 29, 1978 | not chartered | Divine Word College of Legazpi | Legazpi, Albay | BAR | Active | |
| 0412 | **Delta Mu** | Jul 2, 1978 | Jul 2, 1978 | Martinez Memorial Colleges | Caloocan | NCAR | Active | |
| 0413 | **Delta Nu** | Jul 2, 1978 | not chartered | PATTS College of Aeronautics | Parañaque | NCAR | Active | |
| 0414 | **Delta Xi** | Mar 31, 1979 | Apr 1, 1979 | University of Perpetual Help System DALTA | Las Piñas | NCAR | Active | |
| 0415 | **Delta Omicron** | Mar 31, 1979 | Feb 28, 1997 | University of Saint Anthony | Iriga City | BAR | Active | |
| 0416 | **Delta Pi** | Mar 31, 1979 | Apr 25, 2021 | Central Bicol State University of Agriculture | Pili, Camarines Sur | BAR | Active | |
| 0417 | **Delta Rho** | Mar 31, 1979 | Feb 10, 1991 | Polytechnic State University of Bicol - Naga | Naga City | BAR | Active | |
| 0418 | **Delta Sigma** | Apr 1, 1979 | not chartered | Colegio de Santa Rita | San Carlos City, Negros Occidental | NVAR | Active | |
| 0419 | **Delta Tau** | Apr 1, 1979 | Sep 29, 1979 | University of San Agustin | Iloilo City | NVAR | Active | |
| 0420 | **Delta Upsilon** | Apr 1, 1979 | not chartered | Bicol University - Guinobatan | Guinobatan, Albay | BAR | Active | |
| 0421 | **Delta Phi** | Apr 1, 1979 | Dec 20, 1987 | Eastern Visayas State University | Tacloban City | SEVAR | Active | |
| 0422 | Delta Chi | Apr 1, 1979 | not chartered | Liwag College of Agriculture | Cabanatuan | NLAR | Inactive | |
| 0423 | **Delta Psi** | Apr 1, 1979 | not chartered | Universidad de Santa Isabel | Naga, Camarines Sur | BAR | Active | |
| 0424 | **Delta Omega** | Apr 1, 1979 | May 23, 2019 | University of Negros Occidental - Recoletos | Bacolod | NVAR | Active | |
| 0501 | **Epsilon Alpha** | Apr 1, 1979 | not chartered | University of Cebu | Cebu City | SEVAR | Active | |
| 0502 | **Epsilon Beta** | Apr 1, 1979 | Apr 1, 1979 | University of Perpetual Help System JONELTA – Manila Campus | Sampaloc, Manila | NCAR | Active | |
| 0503 | **Epsilon Gamma** | Apr 1, 1979 | not chartered | Saint Paul University Surigao | Surigao City | SMAR | Active | |
| 0504 | **Epsilon Delta** | Sep 29, 1979 | not chartered | Western Institute of Technology | Iloilo City | NVAR | Active | |
| 0505 | **Epsilon Epsilon** | Sep 30, 1979 | not chartered | Agama Islam Academy | Ganassi, Lanao del Sur | NMAR | Active | |
| 0506 | **Epsilon Zeta** | Sep 30, 1979 | Jul 18, 1998 | Southern City Colleges | Zamboanga City | ZPAR | Active | |
| 0507 | **Epsilon Eta** | Sep 30, 1979 | not chartered | Sulu State University | Jolo, Sulu | ZPAR | Active | |
| 0508 | **Epsilon Theta** | Mar 29, 1980 | not chartered | St. Louis College | San Fernando City, La Union | NLAR | Active | |
| 0509 | **Epsilon Iota** | Mar 30, 1980 | not chartered | Tarlac College of Agriculture | Camiling, Tarlac | NLAR | Active | |
| 0510 | **Epsilon Kappa** | Mar 30, 1980 | April 22, 2017 | Bulacan State University | Malolos, Bulacan | NLAR | Active | |
| 0511 | **Epsilon Lambda** | Sep 27, 1980 | May 1, 2001 | Divine Word College of San Jose | San Jose, Occidental Mindoro | MIMAROPA | Active | |
| 0512 | **Epsilon Mu** | Sep 28, 1980 | not chartered | Biliran National Agricultural College | Biliran, Biliran | SEVAR | Active | |
| 0513 | **Epsilon Nu** | Sep 28, 1980 | not chartered | Philippine Merchant Marine School-Las Piñas | Las Piñas | NCAR | Active | |
| 0514 | **Epsilon Xi** | Dec 14, 1980 | Jul 22, 2018 | Columban College | Olongapo City | NLAR | Active | |
| 0515 | **Epsilon Omicron** | Dec 14, 1985 | Dec 14, 1980 | Wesleyan University | Cabanatuan | NLAR | Active | |
| 0516 | **Epsilon Pi** | Dec 28, 1981 | not chartered | Mindanao State University - Lanao del Norte Agricultural College | Karomatan, Lanao del Norte | NMAR | Active | |
| 0517 | **Epsilon Rho** | Dec 28, 1981 | not chartered | Notre Dame of Midsayap College | Midsayap, Cotabato | SMAR | Active | |
| 0518 | **Epsilon Sigma** | Dec 28, 1981 | May 28, 1989 | Mindanao State University - Maguindanao | Datu Odin Sinsuat, Maguindanao del Norte | SMAR | Active | |
| 0519 | **Epsilon Tau** | Dec 28, 1981 | Jul 8, 1984 | Notre Dame of Kidapawan College | Kidapawan City | SMAR | Active | |
| 0520 | **Epsilon Upsilon** | Dec 28, 1981 | Apr 20, 2013 | University of Southeastern Philippines - College of Development Management | Davao City | SMAR | Active | |
| 0521 | **Epsilon Phi** | Dec 29, 1981 | Jul 18, 1998 | Andres Bonifacio College | Dipolog | ZPAR | Active | |
| 0522 | **Epsilon Chi** | Dec 29, 1981 | not chartered | Mindanao State University - Lanao National College of Arts and Trades | Marawi City | NMAR | Active | |
| 0523 | **Epsilon Psi** | Dec 29, 1981 | Mar 28, 1982 | Holy Angel University | Angeles City | NLAR | Active | |
| 0524 | **Epsilon Omega** | Dec 29, 1981 | Mar 23, 2019 | Leyte Colleges | Tacloban City | SEVAR | Active | |
| 0601 | **Zeta Alpha** | Dec 29, 1981 | not chartered | Cagayan de Oro College – PHINMA Education Network | Cagayan de Oro | NMAR | Active | |
| 0602 | **Zeta Beta** | Dec 29, 1981 | not chartered | University of Bohol | Tagbilaran City | SEVAR | Active | |
| 0603 | **Zeta Gamma** | Mar 28, 1982 | not chartered | Nicanor Reyes Memorial College | Paniqui, Tarlac | NLAR | Active | |
| 0604 | **Zeta Delta** | Mar 28, 1982 | Dec 11, 1982 | Tarlac State University | Tarlac City | NLAR | Active | |
| 0605 | **Zeta Epsilon** | Jul 4, 1982 | Jul 4, 1982 | Visayas State University | Baybay, Leyte | SEVAR | Active | |
| 0606 | **Zeta Zeta** | Sep 26, 1982 | not chartered | Notre Dame of Marbel University | Koronadal City | SMAR | Active | |
| 0607 | **Zeta Eta** | Sep 26, 1982 | not chartered | University of Southeastern Philippines - Tagum | Tagum City | SMAR | Active | |
| 0608 | **Zeta Theta** | Dec 11, 1982 | Apr 14, 2019 | Laguna College of Business and Arts | Calamba, Laguna | CALABARZON | Active | |
| 0609 | **Zeta Iota** | Dec 11, 1982 | not chartered | Ago Medical and Educational Center | Legazpi, Albay | BAR | Active | |
| 0610 | **Zeta Kappa** | Dec 12, 1982 | not chartered | Eulogio "Amang" Rodriguez Institute of Science and Technology | Santa Mesa, Manila | NCAR | Active | |
| 0611 | **Zeta Lambda** | May 29, 1983 | Jan 30, 1993 | Mariano Marcos State University - Batac | Batac, Ilocos Norte | NLAR | Active | |
| 0612 | **Zeta Mu** | May 29, 1983 | not chartered | Ovilla Technical College | Masbate City | BAR | Active | |
| 0613 | **Zeta Nu** | May 29, 1983 | not chartered | Catanduanes State Colleges | Virac, Catanduanes | BAR | Active | |
| 0614 | **Zeta Xi** | May 29, 1983 | Dec 8, 2001 | Polytechnic University of the Philippines | Lopez, Quezon | CALABARZON | Active | |
| 0615 | **Zeta Omicron** | May 30, 1983 | May 13, 2023 | Central Philippine University | Iloilo City | NVAR | Active | |
| 0616 | **Zeta Pi** | Dec 3, 1983 | Dec 7, 1984 | Marion College | Ipil, Zamboanga Sibugay | ZPAR | Active | |
| 0617 | **Zeta Rho** | Dec 3, 1983 | May 7, 1995 | Western Mindanao State University | Zamboanga City | ZPAR | Active | |
| 0618 | **Zeta Sigma** | Dec 3, 1983 | not chartered | Mindanao State University – Tawi-Tawi College of Technology and Oceanography | Bongao, Tawi-Tawi | NMAR | Active | |
| 0619 | **Zeta Tau** | Dec 3, 1983 | not chartered | Notre Dame of Jolo College | Jolo, Sulu | ZPAR | Active | |
| 0620 | **Zeta Upsilon** | Jul 8, 1984 | not chartered | North Cotabato School of Arts and Trade | Kidapawan City | SMAR | Active | |
| 0621 | **Zeta Phi** | Oct 7, 1984 | not chartered | University of Iloilo | Iloilo City | NVAR | Active | |
| 0622 | **Zeta Chi** | May 22, 2003 | Oct 7, 1984 | West Visayas State University | Iloilo City | NVAR | Active | |
| 0623 | **Zeta Psi** | Oct 7, 1984 | not chartered | Unciano Paramedical Colleges | Antipolo | NCAR | Active | |
| 0624 | **Zeta Omega** | Oct 7, 1984 | Sep 23, 2002 | University of the Philippines Cebu College | Cebu City | SEVAR | Active | |
| 0701 | **Eta Alpha** | Jul 8, 1984 | May 31, 1985 | St. Louise De Marillac College of Sorsogon | Sorsogon City | BAR | Active | (Note: Chapter formed at Colegiode laa Milagrosa, now called Saint Louise de Marillac College.) |
| 0702 | **Eta Beta** | Dec 7, 1984 | not chartered | Western Mindanao State University - Tampilisan | Tampilisan, Zamboanga del Norte | ZPAR | Active | |
| 0703 | **Eta Gamma** | Dec 7, 1984 | May 13, 2023 | Jose Rizal Memorial State University | Dapitan | ZPAR | Active | |
| 0704 | **Eta Delta** | Dec 7, 1984 | May 13, 2023 | Saint Vincent's College | Dipolog | ZPAR | Active | |
| 0705 | **Eta Epsilon** | Mar 30, 1985 | Apr 1, 1985 | Mariners Polytechnic Colleges | Canaman, Camarines Sur | BAR | Active | |
| 0706 | **Eta Zeta** | Mar 31, 1985 | not chartered | Bicol College – Daraga | Daraga, Albay | BAR | Active | |
| 0707 | **Eta Eta** | Mar 31, 1985 | not chartered | Partido College | Goa, Camarines Sur | BAR | Active | |
| 0708 | **Eta Theta** | Mar 31, 1985 | Apr 29, 1990 | Colegio de San Juan de Letran - Calamba | Calamba, Laguna | CALABARZON | Active | |
| 0709 | **Eta Iota** | Jun 23, 1985 | Oct 21, 2018 | University of Eastern Philippines | Catarman, Northern Samar | SEVAR | Active | |
| 0710 | **Eta Kappa** | Sep 27, 1985 | Sep 25, 2021 | Colegio de San Juan de Letran | Intramuros, Manila | NCAR | Active | |
| 0711 | **Eta Lambda** | Sep 29, 1985 | not chartered | Bukidnon State University | Malaybalay City | SMAR | Active | |
| 0712 | **Eta Mu** | Dec 15, 1985 | not chartered | Divine Word College of Calapan | Calapan, Oriental Mindoro | MIMAROPA | Active | |
| 0713 | **Eta Nu** | Dec 15, 1985 | not chartered | Saint Jude College | Sampaloc, Manila | NCAR | Active | |
| 0714 | **Eta Xi** | Apr 27, 1986 | Apr 25, 2021 | Laguna State Polytechnic University - Siniloan | Siniloan, Laguna | CALABARZON | Active | |
| 0715 | **Eta Omicron** | May 23, 1991 | not chartered | Polytechnic University of the Philippines | Santa Mesa, Manila | NCAR | Active | |
| 0716 | **Eta Pi** | May 27, 1986 | not chartered | Palompon Institute of Technology | Palompon, Leyte | SEVAR | Active | |
| 0717 | **Eta Rho** | Aug 16, 1986 | not chartered | University of Batangas | Batangas City | CALABARZON | Active | |
| 0718 | **Eta Sigma** | Oct 25, 1986 | Jul 6, 1991 | Nueva Vizcaya State University - Bayombong | Bayombong, Nueva Vizcaya | NLAR | Active | |
| 0719 | **Eta Tau** | Dec 21, 1986 | May 25, 2005 | Cebu Doctors' University | Mandaue, Cebu | SEVAR | Active | |
| 0720 | **Eta Upsilon** | Dec 21, 1986 | not chartered | Mindanao State University - Malabang | Malabang, Lanao del Sur | NMAR | Active | |
| 0721 | **Eta Phi** | Dec 21, 1986 | not chartered | Southern Capital College | Oroquieta City | NMAR | Active | |
| 0722 | **Eta Chi** | Dec 21, 1986 | not chartered | Mindanao State University | General Santos | SMAR | Active | |
| 0723 | **Eta Psi** | Jan 25, 1987 | not chartered | La Salle College - Santiago | Santiago, Isabela | NLAR | Active | |
| 0724 | **Eta Omega** | Dec 20, 1987 | not chartered | University of Perpetual Help System Laguna | Biñan, Laguna | CALABARZON | Active | |
| 0801 | **Theta Alpha** | Dec 20, 1987 | not chartered | Samar State University | Catbalogan | SEVAR | Active | |
| 0802 | **Theta Beta** | Dec 20, 1987 | Apr 22, 2017 | University of Southeastern Philippines - Davao City | Davao City | SMAR | Active | |
| 0803 | **Theta Gamma** | Dec 20, 1987 | May 1, 1997 | Palawan State University | Puerto Princesa City | MIMAROPA | Active | |
| 0804 | **Theta Delta** | Dec 20, 1987 | Dec 20, 1987 | Angeles University Foundation | Angeles City | NLAR | Active | |
| 0805 | **Theta Epsilon** | Dec 20, 1987 | Jan 30, 1993 | Nueva Vizcaya State University - Bambang | Bambang, Nueva Vizcaya | NLAR | Active | |
| 0806 | **Theta Zeta** | Jan 27, 1990 | Dec 20, 1987 | University of the Philippines Visayas - Tacloban College | Tacloban City | SEVAR | Active | |
| 0807 | **Theta Eta** | Feb 7, 1988 | not chartered | St. Mary's College | Tagum City | SMAR | Active | |
| 0808 | **Theta Theta** | Dec 20, 1987 | not chartered | Northern Christian College | Laoag City | NLAR | Active | |
| 0809 | **Theta Iota** | Dec 20, 1987 | not chartered | Garcia College of Technology | Kalibo, Aklan | NVAR | Active | |
| 0810 | **Theta Kappa** | Dec 20, 1987 | not chartered | Northwestern Visayan Colleges | Kalibo, Aklan | NVAR | Active | |
| 0811 | **Theta Lambda** | Feb 7, 1988 | not chartered | Northeastern College | Santiago, Isabela | NLAR | Active | |
| 0812 | **Theta Mu** | Feb 7, 1988 | not chartered | University of Mindanao | Tagum City | SMAR | Active | |
| 0813 | **Theta Nu** | Dec 10, 1988 | not chartered | Mindoro State College of Agriculture and Technology | Victoria, Oriental Mindoro | MIMAROPA | Active | |
| 0814 | **Theta Xi** | Sep 11, 1989 | Mar 17, 2019 | Caraga State University | Butuan | SMAR | Active | |
| 0815 | **Theta Omicron** | May 28, 1989 | not chartered | Filamer Christian University | Roxas City, Capiz | NVAR | Active | |
| 0816 | **Theta Pi** | May 28, 1989 | May 28, 1989 | Notre Dame of Dadiangas University | General Santos | SMAR | Active | |
| 0817 | **Theta Rho** | Sep 28, 1991 | not chartered | Cagayan State University | Tuguegarao City, Cagayan | NLAR | Active | |
| 0818 | **Theta Sigma** | Jan 27, 1990 | Sep 9, 1989 | Our Lady of Fatima University College of Medicine | Valenzuela City | NCAR | Active | |
| 0819 | **Theta Tau** | Sep 9, 1989 | not chartered | Saint Joseph Institute of Technology | Butuan | SMAR | Active | |
| 0820 | **Theta Upsilon** | Sep 9, 1989 | not chartered | Bukidnon State University - Gingoog | Gingoog | NMAR | Active | |
| 0821 | **Theta Phi** | Jan 27, 1990 | Sep 28, 1991 | St. Joseph College | Maasin, Southern Leyte | SEVAR | Active | |
| 0822 | **Theta Chi** | Feb 10, 1991 | Feb 10, 1991 | Holy Trinity University | Puerto Princesa City | MIMAROPA | Active | |
| 0823 | Theta Psi | Feb 10, 1991 | Jul 6, 1991 | Ago Foundation College | Naga City | BAR | Inactive | |
| 0824 | **Theta Omega** | Jul 6, 1991 | Jan 25, 1991 | Camarines Sur Polytechnic Colleges | Nabua, Camarines Sur | BAR | Active | |
| 0901 | **Iota Alpha** | Jul 6, 1991 | not chartered | University of the East | Caloocan | NCAR | Active | |
| 0902 | **Iota Beta** | Sep 28, 1991 | Feb 13, 2019 | St. Peter's College of Ormoc | Ormoc City | SEVAR | Active | |
| 0903 | **Iota Gamma** | Sep 28, 1991 | not chartered | Pines City Colleges | Baguio | NLAR | Active | |
| 0904 | **Iota Delta** | Sep 28, 1991 | not chartered | Isabela State University | Echague, Isabela | NLAR | Active | |
| 0905 | **Iota Epsilon** | May 28, 1989 | not chartered | Ramon Magsaysay Memorial Colleges | General Santos | SMAR | Active | |
| 0906 | **Iota Zeta** | Sep 26, 1992 | Aug 12, 1995 | Lyceum-Northwestern University | Dagupan | NLAR | Active | |
| 0907 | **Iota Eta** | Mar 4, 2000 | Sep 26, 1992 | University of the Philippines Manila | Ermita, Manila | NCAR | Active | |
| 0908 | **Iota Theta** | Sep 26, 1992 | Apr 25, 2021 | University of Northern Philippines | Vigan City | NLAR | Active | |
| 0909 | **Iota Iota** | Jan 30, 1993 | Dec 14, 2002 | Southern Luzon State University | Lucban, Quezon | CALABARZON | Active | |
| 0910 | **Iota Kappa** | Jan 30, 1993 | Jan 30, 1993 | Mariano Marcos State University - Laoag City | Laoag City | NLAR | Active | |
| 0911 | **Iota Lambda** | Jan 30, 1993 | Jan 30, 1993 | Virgen Milagrosa University Foundation | San Carlos City, Pangasinan | NLAR | Active | |
| 0912 | **Iota Mu** | Jan 30, 1993 | not chartered | Tomas Claudio Colleges | Morong, Rizal | NCAR | Active | |
| 0913 | **Iota Nu** | May 21, 1993 | not chartered | Romblon State College | Odiongan, Romblon | MIMAROPA | Active | |
| 0914 | **Iota Xi** | May 21, 1993 | not chartered | Colegio de la Purisima Concepcion | Roxas City, Capiz | NVAR | Active | |
| 0915 | **Iota Omicron** | May 21, 1993 | not chartered | La Salle College-Victorias | Victorias City, Negros Occidental | NVAR | Active | |
| 0916 | **Iota Pi** | May 21, 1993 | not chartered | John B. Lacson Foundation Maritime University | Iloilo City | NVAR | Active | |
| 0917 | **Iota Rho** | May 21, 1993 | May 21, 1993 | Dr. Carlos S. Lanting College | Tandang Sora, Quezon City | NCAR | Active | |
| 0918 | **Iota Sigma** | May 21, 1993 | not chartered | Philippine State College of Aeronautics | Lapu-Lapu City, Cebu | SEVAR | Active | |
| 0919 | **Iota Tau** | Nov 27, 1993 | not chartered | Glan School of Arts and Trade | Glan, Sarangani | SMAR | Active | |
| 0920 | **Iota Upsilon** | Jun 19, 1994 | not chartered | John B. Lacson Colleges Foundation – Bacolod, Inc. | Bacolod | NVAR | Active | |
| 0921 | **Iota Phi** | Oct 15, 1994 | Apr 24, 2022 | University of Rizal System | Morong, Rizal | NCAR | Active | |
| 0922 | **Iota Chi** | Jan 28, 1995 | Feb 28, 1997 | Masbate Colleges | Masbate City | BAR | Active | |
| 0923 | **Iota Psi** | Mar 18, 1995 | Jul 22, 2018 | Arellano University School of Law | Pasay | NCAR | Active | |
| 0924 | **Iota Omega** | Mar 27, 1995 | not chartered | Capitol University | Cagayan de Oro | NMAR | Active | |
| 1001 | **Kappa Alpha** | Aug 12, 1995 | Apr 22, 2017 | Pamantasan ng Lungsod ng Maynila | Intramuros, Manila | NCAR | Active | |
| 1002 | **Kappa Beta** | Feb 16, 1996 | Jul 22, 2018 | Our Lady of Fatima University, College of Nursing, Physical Therapy and Dentistry | Valenzuela City | NCAR | Active | |
| 1003 | **Kappa Gamma** | May 25, 1996 | May 25, 1996 | University of the Philippines Visayas, Miagao Campus | Miag-ao, Iloilo | NVAR | Active | |
| 1004 | **Kappa Delta** | Sep 15, 1996 | not chartered | AMA Computer College - Makati | Makati | NCAR | Active | |
| 1005 | **Kappa Epsilon** | Nov 16, 1996 | not chartered | Central Sulu College | Siasi, Sulu | ZPAR | Active | |
| 1006 | **Kappa Zeta** | Nov 16, 1996 | not chartered | University of Mindanao | Digos | SMAR | Active | |
| 1007 | **Kappa Eta** | Nov 16, 1996 | not chartered | Mindanao Polytechnic College | General Santos | SMAR | Active | |
| 1008 | **Kappa Theta** | Nov 16, 1996 | Nov 16, 1996 | Davao Doctors College | Davao City | SMAR | Active | |
| 1009 | **Kappa Iota** | Feb 28, 1997 | not chartered | PLT College | Bayombong, Nueva Vizcaya | NLAR | Active | |
| 1010 | **Kappa Kappa** | May 1, 1997 | not chartered | National College of Business and Arts - Taytay | Taytay, Rizal | NCAR | Active | |
| 1011 | **Kappa Lambda** | May 1, 1997 | not chartered | Upi Agricultural College | Upi, Maguindanao del Norte | SMAR | Active | |
| 1012 | **Kappa Mu** | May 1, 1997 | not chartered | Cotabato Foundation College of Science and Technology | Arakan, Cotabato | SMAR | Active | |
| 1013 | **Kappa Nu** | May 1, 1997 | May 1, 1997 | Western Philippines University | Aborlan, Palawan | MIMAROPA | Active | |
| 1014 | **Kappa Xi** | Oct 3, 1997 | not chartered | Palawan Polytechnic College | Puerto Princesa City | MIMAROPA | Active | |
| 1015 | **Kappa Omicron** | Jul 18, 1998 | not chartered | Cagayan State University | Lal-Lo, Cagayan | NLAR | Active | |
| 1016 | **Kappa Pi** | Jul 18, 1998 | not chartered | Cagayan State Polytechnic College | Cauayan | NLAR | Active | |
| 1017 | **Kappa Rho** | Jul 18, 1998 | not chartered | Cagayan State University | Sanchez-Mira, Cagayan | NLAR | Active | |
| 1018 | **Kappa Sigma** | Mar 27, 1999 | not chartered | Naval State University | Naval, Biliran | SEVAR | Active | |
| 1019 | **Kappa Tau** | May 8, 1999 | Dec 3, 2000 | Dipolog Medical Centre Foundation College, Inc | Dipolog | ZPAR | Active | |
| 1020 | **Kappa Upsilon** | Dec 4, 1999 | not chartered | Cotabato City State Polytechnic College | Cotabato City | SMAR | Active | |
| 1021 | **Kappa Phi** | Jun 23, 2001 | not chartered | Don Mariano Marcos Memorial State University | San Fernando City, La Union | NLAR | Active | |
| 1022 | **Kappa Chi** | Jun 23, 2001 | not chartered | Kabasalan Institute of Technology | Kabasalan, Zamboanga Sibugay | ZPAR | Active | |
| 1023 | **Kappa Psi** | Jun 23, 2001 | May 13, 2023 | Jose Rizal Memorial State University - Katipunan | Katipunan, Zamboanga del Norte | ZPAR | Active | |
| 1024 | **Kappa Omega** | Jan 21, 2001 | not chartered | Lyceum of the Philippines University - Batangas | Batangas City | CALABARZON | Active | |
| 1101 | **Lambda Alpha** | Dec 8, 2001 | not chartered | AMA Computer College - Quezon City | Quezon City | NCAR | Active | |
| 1102 | **Lambda Beta** | Dec 8, 2001 | not chartered | Polytechnic University of the Philippines, Santo Tomas | Santo Tomas, Batangas | CALABARZON | Active | |
| 1103 | **Lambda Gamma** | Jun 23, 2002 | November 8, 2020 | University of Northern Philippines | Candon City | NLAR | Active | |
| 1104 | **Lambda Delta** | Sep 23, 2002 | not chartered | Eastern Quezon College | Gumaca, Quezon | CALABARZON | Active | |
| 1105 | **Lambda Epsilon** | Sep 23, 2002 | Jul 22, 2018 | Dalubhasaan ng Lungsod ng San Pablo | San Pablo City, Laguna | CALABARZON | Active | |
| 1106 | **Lambda Zeta** | Dec 14, 2002 | not chartered | Family Clinic Colleges | Sampaloc, Manila | NCAR | Active | |
| 1107 | **Lambda Eta** | Dec 14, 2002 | not chartered | Mondriaan Aura College | SBMA, Olongapo City | NLAR | Active | |
| 1108 | **Lambda Theta** | Dec 14, 2002 | not chartered | AMA Computer College - East Rizal | Antipolo | NCAR | Active | |
| 1109 | **Lambda Iota** | Dec 14, 2002 | not chartered | AMA Computer College - Santa Cruz Laguna | Santa Cruz, Laguna | CALABARZON | Active | |
| 1110 | **Lambda Kappa** | May 22, 2003 | not chartered | Cebu Aeronautical Technical School | Cebu City | SEVAR | Active | |
| 1111 | **Lambda Lambda** | not chartered | May 23, 2003 | Gordon College | Olongapo City | NLAR | Active | |
| 1112 | **Lambda Mu** | May 23, 2003 | not chartered | Bataan Heroes Memorial College | Balanga, Bataan | NLAR | Active | |
| 1113 | **Lambda Nu** | April 22, 2017 | May 23, 2003 | University of the Philippines Mindanao | Davao City | SMAR | Active | |
| 1114 | **Lambda Xi** | May 23, 2003 | not chartered | Holy Cross of Davao College | Davao City | SMAR | Active | |
| 1115 | **Lambda Omicron** | May 23, 2003 | not chartered | Davao del Norte State College | Panabo City | SMAR | Active | |
| 1116 | **Lambda Pi** | May 23, 2003 | May 23, 2003 | University of St. La Salle | Bacolod | NVAR | Active | |
| 1117 | **Lambda Rho** | May 23, 2003 | not chartered | Tiburcio Tancinco Memorial Institute of Science and Technology | Calbayog | SEVAR | Active | |
| 1118 | **Lambda Sigma** | May 23, 2003 | not chartered | Cor Jesu College | Digos | SMAR | Active | |
| 1119 | **Lambda Tau** | May 23, 2003 | not chartered | Sultan Kudarat State University | Tacurong City | SMAR | Active | |
| 1120 | **Lambda Upsilon** | Oct 1, 2003 | not chartered | University of the Immaculate Conception | Davao City | SMAR | Active | |
| 1121 | **Lambda Phi** | Jun 27, 2004 | May 3, 2014 | Polytechnic University of the Philippines, Ragay | Ragay, Camarines Sur | BAR | Active | |
| 1122 | **Lambda Chi** | Jun 27, 2004 | not chartered | AMA Computer College - Tacloban City | Tacloban City, Leyte | SEVAR | Active | |
| 1123 | **Lambda Psi** | not chartered | May 25, 2005 | Laguna State Polytechnic University - Los Baños | Los Baños, Laguna | CALABARZON | Active | |
| 1124 | **Lambda Omega** | May 25, 2005 | not chartered | Laguna State Polytechnic University - San Pablo City | San Pablo City, Laguna | CALABARZON | Active | |
| 1201 | **Mu Alpha** | May 25, 2005 | May 25, 2005 | Surigao Education Center | Surigao City | SMAR | Active | |
| 1202 | **Mu Beta** | May 25, 2005 | May 25, 2005 | Dona Remedios Trinidad Romualdez Medical Foundation | Tacloban City, Leyte | SEVAR | Active | |
| 1203 | **Mu Gamma** | May 25, 2005 | not chartered | Saint Paul School of Business and Law | Tacloban City | SEVAR | Active | |
| 1204 | **Mu Delta** | May 25, 2005 | not chartered | Technological Institute of the Philippines | Cubao, Quezon City | NCAR | Active | |
| 1205 | **Mu Epsilon** | May 25, 2005 | not chartered | Sorsogon State College | Sorsogon City | BAR | Active | |
| 1206 | **Mu Zeta** | May 25, 2005 | not chartered | Palawan State University | Brooke's Point, Palawan | MIMAROPA | Active | |
| 1207 | **Mu Eta** | May 25, 2005 | not chartered | Central Bicol State University of Agriculture | Sipocot, Camarines Sur | BAR | Active | |
| 1208 | **Mu Theta** | Jan 28, 2006 | not chartered | Liceo de Cagayan University | Cagayan de Oro | NMAR | Active | |
| 1209 | **Mu Iota** | Jan 28, 2006 | not chartered | Southern Bicol Colleges | Masbate City | BAR | Active | |
| 1210 | **Mu Kappa** | Apr 22, 2006 | not chartered | Camarines Norte State College | Daet, Camarines Norte | BAR | Active | |
| 1211 | **Mu Lambda** | Apr 17, 2007 | not chartered | De La Salle Lipa | Mataas na Lupa, Lipa City | CALABARZON | Active | |
| 1212 | **Mu Mu** | Apr 17, 2007 | not chartered | Laguna State Polytechnic University - Santa Cruz | Santa Cruz, Laguna | CALABARZON | Active | |
| 1213 | **Mu Nu** | Apr 17, 2007 | not chartered | AMA Computer College - Lucena | Ilayang Iyam, Lucena | CALABARZON | Active | |
| 1214 | **Mu Xi** | Jun 28, 2007 | not chartered | Basilan State University | Isabela, Basilan | NMAR | Active | |
| 1215 | **Mu Omicron** | May 24, 2008 | not chartered | Good Samaritan Colleges | Cabanatuan | NLAR | Active | |
| 1216 | **Mu Pi** | Oct 26, 2008 | not chartered | Our Lady of Fatima University | Lagro, Quezon City | NCAR | Active | |
| 1217 | **Mu Rho** | May 9, 2009 | not chartered | Aurora State College of Technology | Baler, Aurora | CLAR | Active | |
| 1218 | **Mu Sigma** | May 9, 2009 | not chartered | Technological University of the Philippines - Cavite | Dasmariñas, Cavite | CALABARZON | Active | |
| 1219 | **Mu Tau** | May 9, 2009 | not chartered | Abada College | Pinamalayan, Oriental Mindoro | MIMAROPA | Active | |
| 1220 | **Mu Upsilon** | May 9, 2009 | not chartered | Bicol University - Polangui | Polangui, Albay | BAR | Active | |
| 1221 | **Mu Phi** | Oct 11, 2009 | not chartered | Polytechnic University of the Philippines, Unisan | Unisan, Quezon | CALABARZON | Active | |
| 1222 | **Mu Chi** | Oct 11, 2009 | not chartered | Camarines Norte State College - Labo | Labo, Camarines Norte | BAR | Active | |
| 1223 | **Mu Psi** | May 30, 2010 | not chartered | Surigao State College of Technology | Surigao City, Surigao Del Norte | SMAR | Active | |
| 1224 | **Mu Omega** | Oct 16, 2010 | not chartered | President Ramon Magsaysay State University | Iba, Zambales | NLAR | Active | |
| 1301 | **Nu Alpha** | Oct 16, 2010 | not chartered | Saint Anne's College (Lucena) | Lucena | CALABARZON | Active | |
| 1302 | **Nu Beta** | Jan 23, 2011 | not chartered | Pangasinan State University - Urdaneta | Urdaneta, Pangasinan | NLAR | Active | |
| 1303 | **Nu Gamma** | May 1, 2011 | not chartered | Pamantasan ng Lungsod ng Pasig | Pasig | NCAR | Active | |
| 1304 | **Nu Delta** | May 1, 2011 | not chartered | Pamantasan ng Lungsod ng Muntinlupa | Muntinlupa | NCAR | Active | |
| 1305 | **Nu Epsilon** | May 1, 2011 | not chartered | Asian Institute of Maritime Studies | Pasay | NCAR | Active | |
| 1306 | **Nu Zeta** | May 1, 2011 | not chartered | Manila Doctors College | Pasay | NCAR | Active | |
| 1307 | **Nu Eta** | Jan 28, 2012 | not chartered | Jose Rizal Memorial State University | Dipolog | ZPAR | Active | |
| 1308 | **Nu Theta** | Jan 28, 2012 | not chartered | Polytechnic University of the Philippines, Bataan | Mariveles, Bataan | NLAR | Active | |
| 1309 | **Nu Iota** | Apr 29, 2012 | not chartered | Taguig City University | Taguig | NCAR | Active | |
| 1310 | **Nu Kappa** | Jul 21, 2012 | not chartered | Saint Dominic Savio College | Caloocan | NCAR | Active | |
| 1311 | **Nu Lambda** | Oct 21, 2012 | not chartered | University of Perpetual Help System DALTA – Calamba Campus | Calamba, Laguna | CALABARZON | Active | |
| 1312 | **Nu Mu** | Oct 21, 2012 | not chartered | Holy Trinity College of General Santos City | General Santos | SMAR | Active | |
| 1313 | **Nu Nu** | Apr 20, 2013 | not chartered | Mindoro State College of Agriculture and Technology | Bongabong, Oriental Mindoro | MIMAROPA | Active | |
| 1314 | **Nu Xi** | Apr 20, 2013 | not chartered | Central Bicol State University of Agriculture | Calabanga, Camarines Sur | BAR | Active | |
| 1315 | **Nu Omicron** | Apr 20, 2013 | not chartered | Partido State University | Goa, Camarines Sur | BAR | Active | |
| 1316 | **Nu Pi** | Apr 20, 2013 | not chartered | Marikina Polytechnic College | Marikina | NCAR | Active | |
| 1317 | **Nu Rho** | May 23, 2013 | not chartered | Western Mindanao State University External Studies Unit | Mabuhay, Zamboanga Sibugay | NWMAR | Active | |
| 1318 | **Nu Sigma** | May 23, 2013 | not chartered | Don Honorio Ventura Technological State University | Bacolor, Pampanga | NLAR | Active | |
| 1319 | **Nu Tau** | May 23, 2013 | not chartered | City College of Lucena | Lucena | CALABARZON | Active | |
| 1320 | **Nu Upsilon** | May 3, 2014 | not chartered | Ligao Community College | Ligao City, Albay | BAR | Active | |
| 1321 | **Nu Phi** | Aug 15, 2014 | not chartered | Polytechnic University of the Philippines Quezon City | Quezon City | NCAR | Active | |
| 1322 | **Nu Chi** | Oct 18, 2014 | not chartered | Philippine School of Business Administration | Quezon City | NCAR | Active | |
| 1323 | **Nu Psi** | Oct 18, 2014 | not chartered | Headstart College of Cotabato | Cotabato City | SMAR | Active | |
| 1324 | **Nu Omega** | Apr 18, 2015 | not chartered | Technological University of the Philippines-Visayas | Talisay City, Negros Occidental | NVAR | Active | |
| 1401 | **Xi Alpha** | May 20, 2015 | | San Beda College Alabang | Muntinlupa | NCAR | Active | |
| 1402 | **Xi Beta** | May 20, 2015 | | University of Perpetual Help System DALTA -Molino | Bacoor, Cavite | CALABARZON | Active | |
| 1403 | **Xi Gamma** | Oct 24, 2015 | | Mindanao State University - Sulu Campus | Jolo, Sulu | | Active | |
| 1404 | **Xi Delta** | Jan 30, 2016 | not chartered | Davao Oriental State College of Science and Technology | Mati City, Davao Oriental | SMAR | Active | |
| 1405 | **Xi Epsilon** | Oct 22, 2016 | not chartered | Caraga State University Cabadbaran Campus | Cabadbaran | not chartered | Active | |
| 1406 | **Xi Zeta** | Jan 21, 2017 | | Eastern Samar State University -Borongan | Borongan, Eastern Samar | SEVAR | Active | |
| 1407 | **Xi Eta** | Jan 21, 2017 | | Philippine State College of Aeronautics -Villamor Main Campus | Piccio Garden, Villamor, Pasay | NCAR | Active | |
| 1408 | **Xi Theta** | Apr 22, 2017 | | Abuyog Community College | Abuyog, Leyte | | Active | |
| 1409 | **Xi Iota** | Apr 22, 2017 | | Osmena Colleges | Masbate City | BAR | Active | |
| 1410 | **Xi Kappa** | Apr 22, 2017 | | Mountain View College | Malaybalay, Bukidnon | | Active | |
| 1411 | **Xi Lambda** | Jul 22, 2018 | | Central Luzon College of Science and Technology | San Fernando City, Pampanga | NLAR | Active | |
| 1412 | **Xi Mu** | Feb 13, 2019 | | Metro Manila Colleges | Novaliches, Quezon City | NCAR | Active | |
| 1413 | **Xi Nu** | Mar 23, 2019 | not chartered | Adventist Medical Center College-Iligan | Iligan City | NMAR | Active | |
| 1414 | **Xi Xi** | Apr 14, 2019 | May 13, 2023 | Philippine Law School | Pasay | NCAR | Active | |
| 1415 | **Xi Omicron** | Apr 14, 2019 | not chartered | Far Eastern University – Nicanor Reyes Medical Foundation | Quezon City | NCAR | Active | |
| 1416 | **Xi Pi** | Apr 14, 2019 | not chartered | Golden West College | Alaminos, Pangasinan | NLAR | Active | |
| 1417 | **Xi Rho** | May 23, 2019 | not chartered | Southern Leyte State University - College of Teacher Education | Tomas Oppus, Southern Leyte | SEVAR | Active | |
| 1418 | **Xi Sigma** | November 8, 2020 | | Northern Iloilo State University | Estancia, Iloilo | | Active | |
| 1419 | **Xi Tau** | | | Isabela State University - Ilagan | Ilagan | | Active | |
| 1420 | **Xi Upsilon** | Apr 25, 2021 | | Occidental Mindoro State University | San Jose, Occidental Mindoro | MIMAROPA | Active | |
| 1421 | **Xi Phi** | Apr 25, 2021 | | Palawan State University-Roxas | Roxas, Palawan | MIMAROPA | Active | |
| 1422 | **Xi Chi** | Apr 25, 2021 | | Manila Adventist Medical Center School of Medical Arts | Pasay | NCAR | Active | |
| 1423 | **Xi Psi** | | | John Paul College, Mindoro | Roxas, Oriental Mindoro | MIMAROPA | Active | |
| 1424 | **Xi Omega** | | | STI College - Fairview | Quezon City | NCAR | Active | |
| 1501 | **Omicron Alpha** | | | St. Scholastica College - Tacloban | Tacloban | | Active | |
| 1502 | **Omicron Beta** | | Jun 11, 2021 | West Visayas State University, Pototan | Pototan, Iloilo | | Active | |
| 1503 | **Omicron Gamma** | Sep 9, 2021 | | Passi City College | Passi City, Iloilo | NVAR | Active | |
| 1504 | **Omicron Delta** | | | Manila Law College | Quiapo, Manila | NCAR | Active | |
| 1505 | **Omicron Epsilon** | | | Aklan Catholic College | Kalibo, Aklan | NVAR | Active | |
| 1506 | **Omicron Zeta** | Jul 24, 2022 | | Eastern Visayas State University - Guiuan | Guiuan, Eastern Samar | | Active | |
| 1507 | **Omicron Eta** | Jul 24, 2022 | | Philippine Christian University - Dasmarinas | Dasmarinas City | CALABARZON | Active | |
| 1508 | **Omicron Theta** | Jul 24, 2022 | | Hadji Datu Saidona Pendatun Foundation College | General Salipada K. Pendatun, Maguindanao del Sur | | Active | |
| 1509 | **Omicron Iota** | | Jul 24, 2022 | Leyte Normal University | Tacloban City | | Active | |
| 1510 | **Omicron Kappa** | | | University of Southern Mindanao - Buluan | Buluan, Maguindanao del Sur | | Active | |
| 1511 | **Omicron Lambda** | | | Ilocos Sur Polytechnic State College - Tagudin Campus | Tagudin, Ilocos Sur | | Active | |
| 1512 | **Omicron Mu** | | | Holy Cross College-Nueva Ecija | Santa Rosa, Nueva Ecija | CLAR | Active | |
| 1513 | **Omicron Nu** | Apr 23, 2023 | | Kapalong College of Agriculture, Sciences and Technology | Kapalong, Davao del Norte | | Active | |
| 1514 | **Omicron Xi** | Apr 23, 2023 | | North Central Mindanao College | Lala, Lanao del Norte | | Active | |
| 1515 | **Omicron Omicron** | Apr 23, 2023 | | Davao Merchant Marine Academy College of Southern Philippines | Davao City | | Active | |
| 1516 | **Omicron Pi** | Apr 23, 2023 | | Our Lady of Lourdes College Foundation | Daet, Camarines Norte | BAR | Active | |
| 1517 | **Omicron Rho** | Apr 23, 2023 | | Mount Carmel College of Baler | Baler, Aurora | CLAR | Active | |
| 1518 | **Omicron Sigma** | Apr 23, 2023 | | Batangas State University Apolinario R. Apacible School of Fisheries | Nasugbu, Batangas | CALABARZON | Active | |
| 1519 | **Omicron Tau** | Apr 23, 2023 | | Eastern Visayas State University - Tanauan | Tanauan, Leyte | | Active | |
| 1520 | **Omicron Upsilon** | Apr 23, 2023 | | Cotabato Foundation College of Science and Technology - Pikit Extension Unit | Pikit, Cotabato | | Active | |
| 1521 | **Omicron Phi** | Apr 23, 2023 | | Visayas State University - Tolosa | Tolosa, Leyte | | Active | |
| 1522 | **Omicron Chi** | Apr 23, 2023 | | Datu Ibrahim Paglas Memorial College | Datu Paglas, Maguindanao del Sur | | Active | |
| 1523 | **Omicron Psi** | Apr 23, 2023 | | Burauen Community College | Burauen, Leyte | | Active | |
| 1524 | **Omicron Omega** | May 13, 2023 | | University of Abra | Abra | NLAR | Active | |
| 1601 | **Pi Alpha** | May 13, 2023 | not chartered | Eastern Visayas State University - Buraeun Campus | Buraeun, Leyte | EVAR | Active | |
| 1602 | **Pi Beta** | May 13, 2023 | | ACLC College - Tacloban | Tacloban, Leyte | EVAR | Active | |
| 1603 | **Pi Gamma** | May 13, 2023 | May 13, 2023 | Marinduque State University | Marinduque | MIMAROPA | Active | |

== Alumni associations ==
In the following list, active chapters are indicated in bold and inactive chapters are in italics.

| Code | Acronym | Chapter name | Charter date | Location | Region | Status | Ref. |
|---|---|---|---|---|---|---|---|
| 1 | APO - OCA | APO - Oro City Alumni Association | Oct 13, 1976 | Cagayan de Oro | NMAR | Active | |
| 2 | ILNAPOP | Iligan Lanao del Norte APO Professionals | Jan 14, 1977 | Iligan City | NMAR | Active | |
| 3 | APO - TAAS | APO - Tacloban City Alumni Association | Mar 29, 1980 | Tacloban City | SEVAR | Active | |
| 4 | APO - ORCA | APO - Ormoc City Alumni Association | Dec 2, 1980 | Ormoc City | SEVAR | Active | |
| 5 | APO - RANAO | APO - RANAO Alumni Association | Jan 24, 1981 | Marawi City | NMAR | Active | |
| 6 | APO - ZAMBO | APO - Zamboanga City Alumni Association | Dec 28, 1981 | Zamboanga City | ZPAR | Active | |
| 7 | ANDAA | APO ng Davao City Alumni Association | Dec 28, 1981 | Davao City | SMAR | Active | |
| 8 | APO - KUTAWATO | APO KUTAWATO Alumni Association | Dec 28, 1981 | Cotabato City | SMAR | Active | |
| 9 | APO - AAGLA | APO AA of Greater Los Angeles | Dec 28, 1981 | Los Angeles, California, US | ARNA | Active | |
| 10 | APO - MAA | APO Marikina Alumni Association | Sep 25, 1982 | Marikina | NCAR | Active | |
| 11 | APO - PALANYAG | APO Parañaque Alumni Association | Dec 11, 1982 | Parañaque | NCAR | Active | |
| 12 | APO - DE LA SALLE | APO De La Salle Alumni Association 12 | Dec 11, 1982 | Manila | NCAR | Active | |
| 13 | APO - PAA | APO Pampanga Alumni Association | Dec 11, 1982 | San Fernando, Pampanga | NLAR | Active | |
| 14 | APO - Dhahran | APO Dhahran Alumni Association | Jul 8, 1984 | Dhahran, Saudi Arabia | ARME | Active | |
| 15 | APO - LINAC | APO laoag Ilocos Norte Alumni Association | Jul 9, 1984 | Laoag City | NLAR | Active | |
| 16 | APO - DDZ AA | APO Dipolog - Dapitan Zamboanga Alumni Association | Dec 8, 1984 | Dipolog | ZPAR | Active | |
| 17 | APO - MOA | APO Misamis Oriental Alumni Association | Dec 15, 1985 | Oroquieta City | NMAR | Active | |
| 18 | APO - San Pablo | APO San Pablo City Alumni Association | Dec 15, 1985 | San Pablo City | SLAR | Active | |
| 19 | APO - RINCONADA | APO RINCONADA Alumni Association | Apr 27, 1986 | Iriga City | SLAR | Active | |
| 20 | APO - ISAC | APO Isabela Alumni Chapter | Jun 28, 1986 | Santiago City, Isabela | NLAR | Active | |
| 21 | APO - MLQU | APO - MLQU Alumni Association | May 27, 1986 | Manila | NCAR | Active | |
| 22 | NVAPOAA | Nueva Vizcaya APO Alumni Association | Aug 16, 1986 | Bayombong, Nueva Vizcaya | NLAR | Active | |
| 23 | APO -NEA | APO - Nueva Ecija Alumni Association | Sep 1, 1986 | Cabanatuan | NLAR | Active | |
| 24 | APO - DAA | APO - Dulag Alumni Association | Dec 20, 1987 | Dulag, Leyte | SEVAR | Active | |
| 25 | APO - SCAA | APO - Surigao City Alumni Association | May 28, 1989 | Surigao City | SMAR | Active | |
| 26 | APO - Gingoog | APO - Gingoog City Alumni Association | May 28, 1989 | Gingoog | NMAR | Active | |
| 27 | APO - DEKAALAS | APO - Delta Kappa Alumni Association | Sep 9, 1989 | Silang, Cavite | SLAR | Active | |
| 28 | APO - MUNTI | APO Muntinlupa Alumni Association | Aug 18, 1990 | Muntinlupa | NCAR | Active | |
| 29 | APO - RIYADH | APO - Riyadh Alumni Association | Jan 18, 1992 | Riyadh, Saudi Arabia | ARME | Active | |
| 30 | SAPOC | Samahang Alpha Phi Omega ng Cainta | Sep 26, 1992 | Cainta, Rizal | NCAR | Active | |
| 31 | APO - DOP | APO - Donsol - Pilar Alumni Association | Sep 26, 1992 | Donsol, Sorsogon | SLAR | Active | |
| 32 | APO - MEYCAAS | APO - Meycauayan Bulacan Alumni Association | Sep 26, 1992 | Meycauayan, Bulacan | NLAR | Active | |
| 33 | APO - Bulacan | APO - Bulacan Alumni Association | Nov 21, 1992 | San Ildefonso, Bulacan | NLAR | Active | |
| 34 | APO - Negros | APO - Negros Alumni Association | Jun 30, 1993 | San Carlos City, Negros Occidental | NVAR | Active | |
| 35 | APO - WR - KSA | APO - AA of Western Region KSA | Jun 30, 1993 | Jeddah, Saudi Arabia | ARME | Active | |
| 36 | APO Las Piñas | APO - Las Piñas Alumni Association | Jun 30, 1993 | Las Piñas | NCAR | Active | |
| 37 | APO - Taytay | APO Taytay Alumni Association | May 21, 1993 | Taytay, Rizal | NCAR | Active | |
| 38 | APO - ERAA | APO Eastern Rizal Alumni Association | May 21, 1993 | Morong, Rizal | NCAR | Active | |
| 39 | APO MIDWEST AA | APO Midwest Alumni Association | May 22, 1993 | Chicago, Illinois, US | ARNA | Active | |
| 40 | APO - ROMAA | APO - Romblon Marble Alumni Association | May 22, 1993 | Odiongan, Romblon | SLAR | Active | |
| 41 | APO - Ipil | APO - Ipil Alumni Association | May 22, 1993 | Ipil, Zamboanga Sibugay | ZPAR | Active | |
| 42 | APO - AAA | APO - Antipolo Alumni Association | Sep 12, 1993 | Antipolo | NVAR | Active | |
| 43 | MC - APO AA | Metro Cebu APO Alumni Association | Mar 12, 1994 | Cebu City | NVAR | Active | |
| 44 | APO - LAWMEN | APO Lawmen Alumni Association | Apr 30, 1994 | Manila | NCAR | Active | |
| 45 | APO - San Mateo | APO San Mateo Alumni Association | Apr 30, 1994 | San Mateo, Rizal | NCAR | Active | |
| 46 | APO - Houston | APO Houston Alumni Association | Apr 30, 1994 | Houston, Texas, US | ARNA | Active | |
| 47 | APO - Theta | APO Theta Foundation Alumni Association | Apr 30, 1994 | Los Baños, Laguna | SLAR | Active | |
| 48 | KASAPON | Katinglibansang Alpha Phi Omega sa Negros | Jun 19, 1994 | Bacolod | NVAR | Active | |
| 49 | APO - ICAA | APO - Iloilo City Alumni Association | Jun 19, 1994 | Iloilo City | NVAR | Active | |
| 50 | APO - DAP | APO - Dental Association of the Philippines | Oct 15, 1994 | Manila | NCAR | Active | |
| 51 | APO - DAPRO ALAS | APO - Davao Province Alumni Association | Oct 15, 1994 | Davao City | SMAR | Active | |
| 52 | APO CLUB 1925 | APO Circle of Royal & United Brothers 1925 | Oct 15, 1994 | Lucena | SLAR | Active | |
| 53 | APO - LAUN | APO - La Union Alumni Association | Oct 15, 1994 | San Fernando City, La Union | NLAR | Active | |
| 54 | SAPOAA | Sorsogon Alpha Phi Omega Alumni Association | Jan 29, 1995 | Sorsogon City | SLAR | Active | |
| 55 | FOUR ACES | Albay Alpha Phi Omega Alumni Association | Jan 29, 1995 | Legazpi City | SLAR | Active | |
| 56 | APO - W - Bulacan | APO - Western Bulacan Alumni Association | May 27, 1995 | Malolos, Bulacan | NLAR | Active | |
| 57 | APO - ANG ALAS | APO Angono Alumni Association | May 27, 1995 | Angono, Rizal | NCAR | Active | |
| 58 | APO Midsayap | APO Greater Midsayap Alumni Association | May 27, 1995 | Midsayap, North Cotabato | NMAR | Active | |
| 59 | APO - Jubail | APO Jubail Alumni Association | May 27, 1995 | Jubail, Saudi Arabia | ARME | Active | |
| 60 | APO - Taguig | APO Taguig Alumni Association | Aug 12, 1995 | Taguig | NCAR | Active | |
| 61 | APO - BAAC | APO Bangued Abra Alumni Association | Aug 12, 1995 | Bangued, Abra | NLAR | Active | |
| 62 | APO - Theta Rho | APO Theta Rho Alumni Association | Feb 16, 1996 | Tuguegarao City, Cagayan | NLAR | Active | |
| 63 | APO - Beta Chi | APO Beta Chi Alumni Association | Feb 16, 1996 | Mandaluyong | NCAR | Active | |
| 64 | APO - Toronto | APO Toronto Canada Alumni Association | Feb 16, 1996 | Toronto, Ontario, Canada | ARNA | Active | |
| 65 | APO - Theta Epsilon | APO Theta Epsilon Alumni Association | Sep 15, 1996 | Bambang, Nueva Vizcaya | NLAR | Active | |
| 66 | APO - TAA | APO Tawi-tawi Alumni Association | Nov 16, 1996 | Bongao, Tawi-Tawi | NMAR | Active | |
| 67 | APO - ETAA | APO Epsilon Tau Alumni Association | Nov 16, 1996 | Kidapawan City | SMAR | Active | |
| 68 | APO - KASA | APO Kabacan Alumni Association | Nov 16, 1996 | Kabacan, North Cotabato | SMAR | Active | |
| 69 | APO - LAMP CLUB | APO Lanao Multi - Purpose Club | Nov 16, 1996 | Iligan City | NMAR | Active | |
| 70 | APO - Pantalan | APO Pantalan Alumni Association | Mar 2, 1997 | Manila | NCAR | Active | |
| 71 | APO - Delta | APO Delta Alumni Association | Mar 2, 1997 | Manila | NCAR | Active | |
| 72 | APO - Masbate | APO Masbate Alumni Association | Mar 2, 1997 | Masbate City | SLAR | Active | |
| 73 | APO - LIDE | APO Leyte Industrial Dev. Estate Alumni Association | May 1, 1997 | Isabel, Leyte | SEVAR | Active | |
| 74 | APO - Beta | APO Beta Chapter Alumni Association | May 1, 1997 | Manila | NCAR | Active | |
| 75 | APO - Australia | APO Australia Alumni Association | May 1, 1997 | New South Wales, Australia | ARAP | Active | |
| 76 | APO - MAMA | APO Mt. Makiling Alumni Association | May 1, 1997 | Los Baños, Laguna | SLAR | Active | |
| 77 | APO - MAS | APO Medical Alumni Society | May 1, 1997 | Manila | NCAR | Active | |
| 78 | APO - ALAB | APO Alumni Association of Bohol | May 1, 1997 | Tagbilaran City | SEVAR | | |
| 79 | APO - PALAS | APO Pangasinan Alumni Association | May 1, 1997 | Dagupan | NLAR | Active | |
| 80 | APO - Alpha Omega | APO Alpha Omega Alumni Association | May 1, 1997 | Bayombong, Nueva Vizcaya | NLAR | Active | |
| 81 | APO KAMANAVA | APO Kalookan-Malabon-Navotas- Valenzuela Alumni Association | May 1, 1997 | Manila | NCAR | Active | |
| 82 | APO - Hongkong | APO Hongkong Alumni Association | May 1, 1997 | Victoria, Hong Kong, China | ARAP | Active | |
| 83 | APO -Omega | APO Omega Alumni Association | May 1, 1997 | Quiapo, Manila | NCAR | Active | |
| 84 | APO MSUIAA | APO MSU Integrated Alumni Association | May 1, 1997 | Marawi City | NMAR | Active | |
| 85 | APO - ISAAS | APO Ilocos Sur Alumni Association | May 1, 1997 | Vigan, Ilocos Sur | NLAR | Active | |
| 86 | APO - AANC | APO Alumni Association of Northern California | May 1, 1997 | California, US | ARNA | Active | |
| 87 | APO - APAYAO | APO Apayao Alumni Association | May 1, 1997 | Kabugao, Apayao | NLAR | Active | |
| 88 | SAMAHAN | Samahang Alpha Phi Omega ng Hongkong Community | Oct 4, 1998 | Kowloon, Hong Kong | ARAP | Active | |
| 89 | APO - GAAM | APO Gen. Santos City Alumni Association | Oct 4, 1998 | General Santos | SMAR | Active | |
| 90 | APO - DENR | APO DENR Alumni Association | Jul 18, 1998 | Quezon City | NCAR | Active | |
| 91 | APO - KAA | APO Kabite Alumni Association | Oct 24, 1998 | Imus, Cavite | SLAR | Active | |
| 92 | APO - ICAO | APO Islang Catanduanes Alumni Association | Oct 30, 1998 | Virac, Catanduanes | SLAR | Active | |
| 93 | APO ni RIZAL | APO ni Rizal Alumni Association | Jan 30, 1999 | Calamba | SLAR | Active | |
| 94 | APO - NORWECAA | APO Northwestern Cagayan Alumni Association | Jan 30, 1999 | Cagayan Province | NLAR | Active | |
| 95 | APO - Upsilon | APO Upsilon Alumni Association | Jan 30, 1999 | Manila | NCAR | Active | |
| 96 | APO - UAE (Dubai) | APO United Arab Emirates Alumni Association | Mar 27, 1999 | Dubai, United Arab Emirates | ARME | Active | |
| 97 | APhiOAA - Qatar | APhiO Alumni Association - Qatar | Mar 27, 1999 | Doha, Qatar | ARME | Active | |
| 98 | APO - Lambda | APO Lambda Alumni Association | Mar 27, 1999 | Valenzuela City | NCAR | Active | |
| 99 | KAPOT | Kapatirang Alpha Phi Omega ng Talisay | Mar 27, 1999 | Talisay, Camarines Norte | SLAR | Active | |
| 100 | D - APO CANA | Daet Camarines Norte Alumni Association | Mar 27, 1999 | Daet, Camarines Norte | SLAR | Active | |
| 101 | APO - ALASCA | APO Alumni Association of Southern Cagayan | Mar 27, 1999 | Tuguegarao City, Cagayan | NLAR | Active | |
| 102 | APO - WISAC | APO Western Isabela Alumni Association | Mar 27, 1999 | Roxas, Isabela | NLAR | Active | |
| 103 | APO - NOREASCAA | APO Northeastern Cagayan Alumni Association | Mar 27, 1999 | Lal-lo, Cagayan | NLAR | Active | |
| 104 | APO - C.I.R.C.L.E. 5 | APO Circle of Integrated Radio Communication for Emergency | May 8, 1999 | Tacloban City | SEVAR | Active | |
| 105 | APO Zeta Rho | APO Zeta Rho Alumni Association | May 8, 1999 | Zamboanga City | ZPAR | Active | |
| 106 | APO BISLA | APO Biliran Island Alumni Association | May 8, 1999 | Biliran | SEVAR | Active | |
| 107 | APO MBA | APO - Metro Butuan Alumni Association | May 8, 1999 | Butuan | SMAR | Active | |
| 108 | APO Bayugan | APO Bayugan Alumni Association | May 8, 1999 | Bayugan, Agusan del Sur | SMAR | Active | |
| 109 | APO Kamayo | APO Kamayo Surigao del Sur Alumni Association | May 8, 1999 | Barobo, Surigao del Sur | SMAR | Active | |
| 110 | APO CANAA | APO Cabadbaran Agusan del Norte Alumni Association | May 8, 1999 | Cabadbaran, Agusan del Norte | SMAR | Active | |
| 111 | APO ni San Pedro AA | APO ni San Pedro Alumni Association | Sep 4, 1999 | San Pedro, Laguna | SLAR | Active | |
| 112 | APO ACAA | APO Alpha Chapter Alumni Association | Sep 4, 1999 | Sampaloc, Manila | NCAR | Active | |
| 113 | APO Sta.Cruz AA | APO Sta.Cruz Alumni Association | Dec 4, 1999 | Santa Cruz, Laguna | SLAR | Active | |
| 114 | APO IMBAC AA | APO Imus - Bacoor Alumni Association | Dec 4, 1999 | Imus, Cavite | SLAR | Active | |
| 115 | APO PEZA AA | APO Philippine Export Zone Authority Alumni Association | Dec 4, 1999 | Rosario, Cavite | SLAR | Active | |
| 116 | APO SILAG | APO Silangan Laguna Alumni Association | Jan 23, 2000 | Siniloan, Laguna | SLAR | Active | |
| 117 | STAPOAA | Sto. Tomas APO Alumni Association | Jan 23, 2000 | Santo Tomas, Batangas | SLAR | Active | |
| 118 | APO MANDIN | APO Marinduque Alumni Association | Jan 23, 2000 | Boac, Marinduque | SLAR | Active | |
| 119 | LINGKOD APO | APO Lucena Alumni Association | Jan 23, 2000 | Lucena | SLAR | Active | |
| 120 | APO ALPHA ETA AA | APO Alpha Eta Alumni Association | Jan 23, 2000 | Manila & Quezon City | NCAR | Active | |
| 121 | APOAA - Emarat | APO Alumni Association - Emarat | Jun 23, 2000 | United Arab Emirates | ARME | Active | |
| 122 | APO Alpha Epsilon | APO Alpha Epsilon Chapter Alumni Association | Jun 24, 2000 | Manila | NCAR | Active | |
| 123 | APO Sindangan | APO Sindangan Zamboanga del Norte | Dec 3, 2000 | Sindangan, Zamboanga del Norte | ZPAR | Active | |
| 124 | APO BABE | APO Baguio Benguet Alumni Association | May 27, 2001 | Baguio | NLAR | Active | |
| 125 | CIRCLE S | Circle of Sorority Alumni Association | May 27, 2001 | Mabalacat, Pampanga | NLAR | Active | |
| 126 | SAMAT | APO Samat Alumni Association | May 27, 2001 | Mariveles, Bataan | NLAR | Active | |
| 127 | APO Illana Bay | APO Illana Bay Alumni Association | May 27, 2001 | Pagadian City | ZPAR | Active | |
| 128 | APO Capas | APO Capas Alumni Association | May 27, 2001 | Capas, Tarlac | NLAR | Active | |
| 129 | APO AWWA | APO Alumni Association of Washington State | May 27, 2001 | Washington, US | ARNA | Active | |
| 130 | APO TIKAAS | APO Timog Kotabato Alumni Association | May 27, 2001 | Koronadal City | SMAR | Active | |
| 131 | APO AADFW | APO Alumni Association of Dallas-Fort Worth | May 27, 2001 | Texas, US | ARNA | Active | |
| 132 | APONSAA | APO Nevada State Alumni Association | May 27, 2001 | Las Vegas, Nevada, uS | ARNA | Active | |
| 133 | APO Eta Theta AA | APO Eta Theta Chapter Alumni Association | Dec 8, 2001 | Calamba | SLAR | Active | |
| 134 | APO OrMAA | APO Oriental Mindoro Alumni Association | Dec 8, 2001 | Calapan, Oriental Mindoro | SLAR | Active | |
| 135 | PAPOAA | Palawan APO Alumni Association | Mar 23, 2002 | Puerto Princesa City, Palawan | SLAR | Active | |
| 136 | APO ni Bonifacio | APO ni Bonifacio Alumni Association | Mar 23, 2002 | Makati | NCAR | Active | |
| 137 | FRH SOCIETY | Frank Reed Horton Society | Mar 23, 2002 | Puerto Princesa City, Palawan | SLAR | Active | |
| 138 | GSAPO | Grupo ng Samahang Alpha Phi Omega | Jun 23, 2002 | San Jose City, Nueva Ecija | NLAR | Active | |
| 139 | APOSJAA | APO ni San Jose City Alumni Association | Jun 23, 2002 | San Jose del Monte City | NLAR | Active | |
| 140 | APO BEZ | APO Bataan Export Zone | Jun 23, 2002 | Mariveles, Bataan | NLAR | Active | |
| 141 | GAPOS | Gumaca Alpha Phi Omega Solidarity | Sep 21, 2002 | Gumaca, Quezon | SLAR | Active | |
| 142 | APO Pasigueño | APO Pasigueño Alumni Association | Sep 21, 2002 | Pasig | NCAR | Active | |
| 143 | APO PAGASA | APO PAGASA Alumni Association | Sep 21, 2002 | Makati | SMAR | Active | |
| 144 | APO AMuAA | APO Alpha Mu Alumni Association | Mar 22, 2003 | Cebu City | SEVAR | Active | |
| 145 | APO KTauAA | APO Kappa Tau Alumni Association | May 22, 2003 | Dipolog | ZPAR | Active | |
| 146 | APO Sigma AA | APO Sigma Alumni Association | May 22, 2003 | Manila | NCAR | Active | |
| 147 | KAPATID | Kapatirang APO ng Timog Davao | May 22, 2003 | Davao del Sur | SMAR | Active | |
| 148 | APO OAA | APO Olongapo Alumni Association | May 22, 2003 | Olongapo City | NLAR | Active | |
| 149 | APO TarAA | APO Tarlac Alumni Association | May 22, 2003 | Tarlac City | NLAR | Active | |
| 150 | APO NOrAA | APO Negros Oriental Alumni Association | May 22, 2003 | Dumaguete | NVAR | Active | |
| 151 | SAMa.k.a. | SAMAHANG APO ng Makati | May 23, 2003 | Makati | NCAR | Active | |
| 152 | APOBAA | APO Bukidnon Alumni Association | May 23, 2003 | Bukidnon | NMAR | Active | |
| 153 | APO KAA | APO Kuwait Alumni Association | Sep 12, 2003 | Kuwait | ARME | Active | |
| 154 | APOUKAA | APO UK Alumni Association | Dec 14, 2003 | London, England | ARE | Active | |
| 155 | APO Ligao (SAPOL) | APO Ligao Alumni Association | Dec 14, 2003 | Ligao City, Albay | SLAR | Active | |
| 156 | APO Lipa | APO Lipa Alumni Association | Dec 14, 2003 | Lipa City | SLAR | Active | |
| 157 | APO Mississauga AA | APO Mississauga Alumni Association | Jun 26, 2004 | Mississauga, Ontario, Canada | ARNA | Active | |
| 158 | APO SAPON AA | Samahang Alpha Phi Omega ng Nabua Alumni Association | Jun 27, 2004 | Nabua, Camarines Sur | SLAR | Active | |
| 159 | APO Alpha Omicron AA | APO Alpha Omicron Alumni Association | Mar 2, 2005 | Tacloban City, Leyte | SEVAR | Active | |
| 160 | APO BUYOG AA | APO Buyog Alumni Association | Mar 2, 2005 | Abuyog, Leyte | SEVAR | Active | |
| 161 | APO BONGA AA | APO Bongabong Alumni Association | Mar 2, 2005 | Bongabong, Nueva Ecija | NLAR | Active | |
| 162 | APO Maqueda AA | APO Maqueda Alumni Association | May 25, 2005 | Catbalogan, Samar | SEVAR | Active | |
| 163 | APO - STAR AA | APO Santa Rosa Alumni Association | May 25, 2005 | Santa Rosa, Laguna | SLAR | Active | |
| 164 | APO BTI AA | APO Beta Tau International Alumni Association | May 25, 2005 | San Andres Street Malate, Manila | NCAR | Active | |
| 165 | Lupah Sug AA | Lupah Sug Alumni Association | May 25, 2005 | Jolo, Sulu | ZPAR | Active | |
| 166 | Big Water Royale AA | Big Water Royale Alumni Association | Oct 29, 2005 | Marawi City | NMAR | Active | |
| 167 | APO AAK | APO Kidapawan Alumni Association | Jan 28, 2006 | Kidapawan City | SMAR | Active | |
| 168 | APO-TEL AA | APO TEL Alumni Association | Jul 28, 2006 | Manila | NCAR | Active | |
| 169 | APO AGAA | APO Alpha Gamma Alumni Association | Jul 28, 2006 | Dagupan, Pangasinan | NLAR | Active | |
| 170 | APO VAB | APO Villamor Air Base Alumni Association | Nov 11, 2006 | Pasay | NCAR | Active | |
| 171 | Alas ng Epsilon Kappa | Alumni Association ng Epsilon Kappa | Nov 11, 2006 | Pulilan, Bulacan | NLAR | Active | |
| 172 | APO Gamma Xi AA | APO Gamma Xi Chapter Alumni Association | Nov 11, 2006 | Legazpi City | SLAR | Active | |
| 173 | APO Psi AA | APO Psi Alumni Association | Nov 11, 2006 | Manila | NCAR | Active | |
| 174 | APO Milano AA | APO Milano Alumni Association | Nov 11, 2006 | Milan, Italy | ARE | Active | |
| 175 | GWAPO | Greater Washington Alpha Phi Omega | Apr 17, 2007 | Washington, US | ARNA | Active | |
| 176 | APO Epsilon Omega AA | Epsilon Omega Alumni Association | Apr 17, 2007 | Tacloban City, Leyte | SEVAR | Active | |
| 177 | APO Epsilon AA | Epsilon Alumni Association | Apr 17, 2007 | Pandacan, Manila | NCAR | Active | |
| 178 | APO Tagaytay AA | Tagaytay Alumni Association | Apr 17, 2007 | Tagaytay | SLAR | Active | |
| 179 | APO ni Malvar AA | Malvar Alumni Association | Apr 17, 2007 | Malvar, Batangas | SLAR | Active | |
| 180 | APO Son Alas AA | Southern Ontario Alumni Association | May 3, 2007 | Toronto, Ontario, Canada | ARNA | Active | |
| 181 | APO Manda AA | APO Mandaluyong Alumni Association | May 3, 2007 | Mandaluyong | NCAR | Active | |
| 182 | APO-POAPS | APO Penology Officers Association of the Philippines | May 3, 2007 | Mandaluyong | NCAR | Active | |
| 183 | APO BORACAY | APO Boracay Alumni Association | Jun 28, 2007 | Boracay, Aklan | NVAR | Active | |
| 184 | APO ABORLAN | APO Aborlan Alumni Association | Jan 26, 2008 | Aborlan, Palawan | SLAR | Active | |
| 185 | APO ORAGON | APO Oragon Metro Naga Alumni Association | Apr 27, 2008 | Naga, Camarines Sur | SLAR | Active | |
| 186 | APO CVC | APO Central Valley California Alumni Association | Oct 26, 2008 | Central Valley, California, US | ARNA | Active | |
| 187 | APO BRITISH COLUMBIA AA | APO British Columbia Alumni Association | Oct 26, 2008 | British Columbia, Canada | ARNA | Active | |
| 188 | APO LA MESA | APO La Mesa Alumni Association | Oct 26, 2008 | Pangarap Village, Caloocan | NCAR | Active | |
| 189 | APO SINGAPORE | APO Alumni Association of Singapore | Oct 26, 2008 | Rivervale Crescent, Sengkang, Singapore | ARAP | Active | |
| 190 | APO DELTA ALPHA | APO Delta Alpha Alumni Association | Oct 26, 2008 | Mandaluyong | NCAR | Active | |
| 191 | APO District of Columbia AA | APO District of Columbia Alumni Association | Feb 1, 2009 | Maryland, Virginia, and Washington D.C., US | ARNA | Active | |
| 192 | APO SAN DIEGO | APO San Diego Alumni Association | Feb 1, 2009 | San Diego, California, uS | ARNA | Active | |
| 193 | APO SCIENCE CITY OF MUNOZ | APO Science City of Munoz Alumni Association | Feb 1, 2009 | Bantug, Science City of Muñoz | NLAR | Active | |
| 194 | APO DE MAYUMO | APO De Mayumo Alumni Association | Feb 1, 2009 | San Miguel, Bulacan | NLAR | Active | |
| 195 | APO CABA | APO Cabanatuan City Alumni Association | Feb 1, 2009 | Cabanatuan | NLAR | Active | |
| 196 | APO SAPOT | Samahan ng APO sa Tundo | Feb 1, 2009 | Tondo, Manila | NCAR | Active | |
| 197 | APO PANDACAN | APO Pandacan Alumni Association | Apr 18, 2009 | Pandacan, Manila | NCAR | Active | |
| 198 | APO AUSTRIA AA | APO Alumni Association in Austria | May 9, 2009 | Vienna, Austria | ARE | Active | |
| 199 | TAMAPO KAMI | Tamaraw APO ng Kanlurang Mindoro | May 9, 2009 | Occidental Mindoro | SLAR | Active | |
| 200 | GAMMA THETA AA | Gamma Theta Alumni Association | May 9, 2009 | Davao City | SMAR | Active | |
| 201 | APO Hawaii AA | APO Alumni Association of Hawaii | May 9, 2009 | Ewa Beach, Hawaii, US | ARNA | Active | |
| 202 | APO Zeta Xi AA | APO Zeta Xi Alumni Association | May 9, 2009 | Lopez, Quezon | SLAR | Active | |
| 203 | APO EIREANN AA | APO Alumni Association Republic of Ireland | May 9, 2009 | Republic of Ireland | ARE | Active | |
| 204 | APO PAGBILIO AA | APO Pagbilao Alumni Association | May 9, 2009 | Pagbilao, Quezon | SLAR | Active | |
| 205 | APO SFSV AA | APO Alumni Association of San Francisco and Silicon Valley | May 9, 2009 | San Francisco and Silicon Valley, California, US | ARNA | Active | |
| 206 | APO - DNA | Alpha Phi Omega - Delta Nu Alumni Association | Oct 11, 2009 | Pasay | NCAR | Active | |
| 207 | APO - Bahrain | APO - Bahrain Alumni Association | Oct 11, 2009 | Al Manamah, Bahrain | ARME | Active | |
| 208 | APO - Xi AA | APO - Xi Alumni Association | Oct 11, 2009 | Cabanatuan | NLAR | Active | |
| 209 | ALTAA | APO Lambda Theta Alumni Association | Oct 11, 2009 | Antipolo | NCAR | Active | |
| 210 | APOKAA | APO Kalinga Alumni Association | Oct 11, 2009 | Kalinga | NLAR | Active | |
| 211 | APO Roma | APO Roma Alumni Association | May 30, 2010 | Rome, Italy | ARE | Active | |
| 212 | APO Malabon AA | APO Malabon Alumni Association | 2010 | Malabon | NCAR | Active | |
| 213 | APO Auckland (New Zealand) AA | APO Auckland Alumni Association | Jan 23, 2011 | Auckland, New Zealand | ARAP | Active | |
| 214 | APO Victoria (Australia) AA | APO Victoria Alumni Association | Jan 23, 2011 | Victoria, Australia | ARAP | Active | |
| 215 | APO Oman AA | APO Oman Alumni Association | Jan 23, 2011 | Oman | ARME | Active | |
| 216 | APO-OAA | APO-Omicron Alumni Association | May 1, 2011 | Angeles City | NLAR | Active | |
| 217 | APO-EUAA | APO-Epsilon Upsilon Alumni Association | May 1, 2011 | Davao City | SMAR | Active | |
| 218 | APO-TBAA | APO-Theta Beta Alumni Association | May 1, 2011 | Davao City | SMAR | Active | |
| 219 | APO-APAA | APO-Alpha Phi Alumni Association | May 1, 2011 | Quezon City | NCAR | Active | |
| 220 | APO-GKAA | APO-Gamma Kappa Alumni Association | May 1, 2011 | Quezon City | NCAR | Active | |
| 221 | APO-IEAA | APO-Iota Eta Alumni Association | May 1, 2011 | Manila | NCAR | Active | |
| 222 | APO-ENAA | APO-Epsilon Nu Alumni Association | May 1, 2011 | Las Piñas | NCAR | Active | |
| 223 | APO-EOAA | APO-Epsilon Omicron Alumni Association | May 1, 2011 | Cabanatuan | NLAR | Active | |
| 224 | APO-DOSAA | APO-Datu Odin Sinsuat Alumni Association | May 1, 2011 | Datu Odin Sinsuat, Maguindanao del Norte | SMAR | Active | |
| 225 | APO-SAA | APO-Salipawpao Alumni Association | May 1, 2011 | Puerto Princesa City | SLAR | Active | |
| 226 | APO-Sipocot | APO-Sipocot Alumni Association | May 1, 2011 | Sipocot, Camarines Sur | SLAR | Active | |
| 227 | APO-Talas | APO-Tiaong Alumni Association | May 1, 2011 | Tiaong, Quezon | SLAR | Active | |
| 228 | APO-Web AA | APO-Western Batangas Alumni Association | May 1, 2011 | Nasugbu, Batangas | SLAR | Active | |
| 229 | APO-BKAA | APO-Beta Kappa Alumni Association | May 1, 2011 | Naga City | SLAR | Active | |
| 230 | APO-ZIAA | APO-Zeta Iota Alumni Association | May 1, 2011 | Legazpi City | SLAR | Active | |
| 231 | APO-AAC | APO-Alumni Association of Cabuyao | May 1, 2011 | Cabuyao, Laguna | SLAR | Active | |
| 232 | APO-BNAA | APO-Beta Nu Alumni Association | May 1, 2011 | Zamboanga City | ZPAR | Active | |
| 233 | APO-ALAA | APO-Alpha Lambda Alumni Association | May 1, 2011 | Manila | NCAR | Active | |
| 234 | APO NAA | APO-Nu Chapter Alumni Association | May 1, 2011 | Manila | NCAR | Active | |
| 235 | APO-Congress | APO-Congress Alumni Association | May 1, 2011 | Quezon City | NCAR | Active | |
| 236 | APO-GIAA | APO-Gamma Iota Alumni Association | May 1, 2011 | Manila | NCAR | Active | |
| 237 | APO - Basilan | APO Basilan Alumni Association | May 26, 2011 | Isabela City | NMAR | Active | |
| 238 | APO - Fairview | APO Fairview Alumni Association | May 28, 2011 | Fairview, Quezon City | NCAR | Active | |
| 239 | APO - Paris-France | APO France Alumni Association | May 26, 2011 | Paris, France | ARE | Active | |
| 240 | APO-ANAA | APO Alpha Nu Alumni Association | May 26, 2011 | Naga City | SLAR | Active | |
| 241 | APO-TAWA | APO Taiwan Alumni Association | Jan 27, 2012 | Taiwan | ARAP | Active | |
| 242 | APO-CIAA | APO Capitol Integrated Alumni Association | Jan 27, 2012 | Marawi City | NMAR | Active | |
| 243 | APO EAAA | APO – Epsilon Alpha Alumni Association | Jan 27, 2012 | Cebu City | SEVAR | Active | |
| 244 | APO ADAA | APO – Alpha Delta Alumni Association | Jul 20, 2012 | Quiapo, Manila | NCAR | Active | |
| 245 | APO GAA | APO – Gamma Omicron Alumni Association | Jul 27, 2012 | Legazpi City | SLAR | Active | |
| 246 | APO AAA | APO Alumni Association of Alberta | Jul 27, 2012 | Edmonton, Alberta, Canada | ARNA | Active | |
| 247 | APO SLAA | San Leonardo Alumni Association | Nov 4, 2012 | Nueva Ecija | NLAR | Active | |
| 248 | APO TAAA | APO Tokyo Alumni Association | Nov 4, 2012 | Tokyo, Japan | ARAP | Active | |
| 249 | APO WPAA | APO Western Pangasinan Alumni Association | Nov 4, 2012 | Pangasinan | NLAR | Active | |
| 250 | APO LPAA | Lambda Pi Alumni Association | Nov 4, 2012 | Bacolod | NVAR | Active | |
| 251 | APO CAA | Chi Alumni Association | Nov 4, 2012 | Lucena | SLAR | Active | |
| 252 | APO ALTHAA | Alpha Theta Alumni Association | Nov 4, 2012 | Manila | NCAR | Active | |
| 253 | APO BPAA | Beta Phi Alumni Association | Nov 4, 2012 | Davao City | SMAR | Active | |
| 254 | APO KPAA | Pantabangan Alumni Association | Jul 27, 2012 | Nueva Ecija | NLAR | Active | |
| 255 | APO GEAA | APO Gamma Eta AA | Jan 27, 2013 | Nueva Ecija | NLAR | Active | |
| 256 | APO ZARAA | APO Zaragoza AA | Jan 27, 2013 | Nueva Ecija | NLAR | Active | |
| 257 | APO FGAA | APO Frankfurt Germany AA | Jan 27, 2013 | Frankfurt, Hesse, Germany | ARE | Active | |
| 258 | APO GNYAA | APO Greater New York AA | Apr 20, 2013 | New York City, New York, US | ARNA | Active | |
| 259 | APO DOAA | APO Davao Occidental AA | Apr 20, 2013 | Malita, Davao del Sur | SEMAR | Active | |
| 260 | APO SMAA | APO Sta Mesa Alumni Association | Apr 20, 2013 | Sta Mesa, Manila | NCAR | Active | |
| 261 | APO SIAA | APO SIAM Alumni Association | Apr 20, 2013 | Bangkok, Thailand | ARAP | Active | |
| 262 | APO DeNCAA | APO DEPARO North Caloocan Alumni Association | Apr 20, 2013 | Caloocan | NCAR | Active | |
| 263 | APO-TEL AVIV-YSRAEL | Alpha Phi Omega of Tel Aviv-Ysrael Alumni Association | May 23, 2013 | Tel Aviv, Israel | ARE | Active | |
| 264 | APO-FAA | APO Firenze Alumni Association 264 | May 23, 2013 | Firenze, Tuscany, Italy | ARE | Active | |
| 265 | SAPO-L.A.A.A | Samahang APO ng Lower Antipolo | May 23, 2013 | Antipolo | NCAR | Active | |
| 266 | APO SFAA | APO Alumni Association of San Fabian 266 | May 23, 2013 | San Fabian, Pangasinan | NLAR | Active | |
| 267 | APO HA | APO Hollywood Alumni Association | May 23, 2013 | Chatsworth, California, US | ARNA | Active | |
| 268 | APO GAA | APO Guinobatan Alumni Association | May 23, 2013 | Guinobatan, Albay | SLAR | Active | |
| 269 | SAPORO | Samahang APO ng Rodriguez | May 23, 2013 | Rodriguez, Rizal | NCAR | Active | |
| 270 | APO ZAA | APO Zeta Alumni Association | May 23, 2013 | Bacolod | NVAR | Active | |
| 271 | APO DLAA | APO Delta Lambda Alumni Association | May 23, 2013 | Legaspi City | SLAR | Active | |
| 272 | APOEIAA | APO Eta Iota Alumni Association | May 23, 2013 | Catarman, Northern Samar | SVAR | Active | |
| 273 | APO GOA | APO Goa Alumni Association | May 23, 2013 | Goa, Camarines Sur | SLAR | Active | |
| 274 | APO SKAA | APO Sultan Kudarat Alumni Association | May 23, 2013 | Sultan Kudarat, South Cotabato | SMAR | Active | |
| 275 | APO AAA | APO Aklan Ati-atihan Alumni Association | May 23, 2013 | Iloilo City | NVAR | Active | |
| 276 | APO SAA | APO Sydney Alumni Association 276 | May 23, 2013 | Sydney, New South Wales, Australia | ARAP | Active | |
| 277 | APO DAR | APO Department of Agrarian Reform Alumni Association | Aug 17, 2013 | Tacloban City | SVAR | Active | |
| 278 | APO RAGAT AA | APO RAGAT Alumni Association | Aug 17, 2013 | Malabang, Lanao del Sur | NMAR | Active | |
| 279 | APO Sarimanok AA | APO Sarimanok Alumni Association 279 | Aug 17, 2013 | Quiapo, Manila | NCAR | Active | |
| 280 | APO NEE AA | APO Northeast England Alumni Association 280 | Aug 17, 2013 | Northeast England, UK | ARE | Active | |
| 281 | APO JAA | APO Jeddah 281 | Jan 18, 2014 | Jeddah, Makkah Province, Saudi Arabia | ARME | Active | |
| 282 | APO GSPAA | APO Glan Sarangani Province Alumni Association | Jan 18, 2014 | Glan, Sarangani | SMAR | Active | |
| 283 | APO ETAA | APO Eta Omicron Alumni Association | May 3, 2014 | Sta Mesa, Manila | NCAR | Active | |
| 284 | APO MDAA | APO Muddas Alumni Association | May 3, 2014 | Siasi, Sulu | ZPAR | Active | |
| 285 | APO BSAA | APO Barcelona-Spain Alumni Association 285 | May 3, 2014 | Barcelona, Catalonia, Spain | ARE | Active | |
| 286 | APO DOAA | APO Delta Omega Alumni Association | May 3, 2014 | Bacolod | NVAR | Active | |
| 287 | APO SAA | Samahang APO ng Sta Ana Alumni Association 287 | May 3, 2014 | Santa Ana, Manila | NCAR | Active | |
| 288 | APO KAA | APO Kappa Alpha Alumni Association | May 3, 2014 | Intramuros, Manila | NCAR | Active | |
| 289 | APO RAA | APO Rosales Alumni Association | May 3, 2014 | Rosales, Pangasinan | NLAR | Active | |
| 290 | APO TPAA | APO Theta Pi Alumni Association | May 3, 2014 | General Santos | SMAR | Active | |
| 291 | APO WAA | Alpha Phi Omega Western Australia Alumni Association | Aug 15, 2014 | Perth, Western Australia, Australia | ARAP | Active | |
| 292 | APO HSAA | APO Housing Society | Aug 15, 2014 | Quezon City | NCAR | Active | |
| 293 | APO TAA | APO Tanauan Alumni Association | Oct 18, 2014 | Tanauan City | SLAR | Active | |
| 294 | APO BPAA | APO Beta Pi Alumni Association | Oct 18, 2014 | Baliuag, Bulacan | NLAR | Active | |
| 295 | APO BTAA | APO Beta Theta Alumni Association | Jan 24, 2015 | Kabacan, Cotabato | SMAR | Active | |
| 296 | APO MPAA | APO Mt. Pinatubo Alumni Association | Jan 24, 2015 | Zambales | | Active | |
| 297 | APO MEAA | APO Metro England Alumni Association | Apr 18, 2015 | England, UK | ARE | Active | |
| 298 | APO ONAA | APO Oslandet Norway Alumni Association | Apr 18, 2015 | Eastern Norway | | Active | |
| 299 | APO CNAA | APO Christiania Norway Alumni Association | Apr 18, 2015 | Christiania, Oslo, Norway | ARE | Active | |
| 300 | APO GRAA | APO Gamma Rho Alumni Association | Apr 18, 2015 | Quezon City | NCAR | Active | |
| 301 | APO DAA | APO - Dasmariñas Alumni Association | Apr 18, 2015 | Cavite | SLAR | Active | |
| 302 | APO IAA | APO Iota Alumni Association | Apr 18, 2015 | Manila | NCAR | Active | |
| 303 | APO ZTAA | APO Zeta Theta Alumni Association | Apr 18, 2015 | San Pablo City | SLAR | Active | |
| 304 | BAPOAA | Buhi APO Alumni Association | Apr 18, 2015 | Buhi, Camarines Sur | | Active | |
| 305 | APO ECAA | APO Eta Chi Alumni Association | May 20, 2015 | General Santos | SMAR | Active | |
| 306 | APOSIAA | APO San Isidro Alumni Association | May 20, 2015 | San Isidro, Nueva Ecija | NLAR | Active | |
| 307 | APOBAA | APO Bologna Alumni Association | May 20, 2015 | Bologna, Emilia-Romagna, Italy | | Active | |
| 308 | APO GPAA | APO Gamma Phi Alumni Association | May 20, 2015 | Cotabato City | SMAR | Active | |
| 309 | APO ZUAA | APO Zeta Upsilon Alumni Association | May 20, 2015 | Kidapawan City | SMAR | Active | |
| 310 | APO SAA | APO Shamrock Alumni Association | May 20, 2015 | Northern Ireland, UK | ARE | Active | |
| 311 | APO SKAA | APO Seoul Korea | Oct 24, 2015 | Seoul, South Korea | | Active | |
| 312 | APO ESAA | APO Sorority - Eta Alumnae Association | Jan 30, 2016 | Quezon City | NCAR | Active | |
| 313 | APO CBAA | APO Caloocan Bukid Area Alumni Association | May 21, 2016 | Camarin, Caloocan | | Active | |
| 314 | APO BDAA | APO Brunei Darussalam Alumni Association | May 21, 2016 | Brunei Darussalam | | Active | |
| 315 | APO CAA | APO Cagsawa Alumni Association | May 21, 2016 | Daraga, Albay | SLAR | Active | |
| 316 | APO ZKAA | APO Zeta Kappa Alumni Association | Aug 24, 2016 | Manila | NCAR | Active | |
| 317 | APO QAA | APO Queensland Australia Alumni Association | Oct 22, 2016 | Queensland, Australia | ARAP | Active | |
| 318 | APO SAA | APO Sampaloc Alumni Association | Jan 21, 2017 | Sampaloc, Manila | | Active | |
| 319 | APO NCAA | APO Nu Chi Alumni Association | Jan 21, 2017 | Quezon City | | Active | |
| 320 | APO MAA | APO Macau Alumni Association | Jan 21, 2017 | Macau SAR, China | | Active | |
| 321 | APO BBAA | APO Beta Beta Alumni Association | Apr 22, 2017 | Ermita, Manila | | Active | |
| 322 | APO ZNAA | APO Zeta Nu Alumni Association | Apr 22, 2017 | Virac, Catanduanes | | Active | |
| 323 | APO CAA | APO Calapan Alumni Association | Apr 22, 2017 | Calapan, Mindoro | | Active | |
| 324 | APO BOAA | APO Beta Omicron Alumni Association | Apr 22, 2017 | Daet, Camarines Norte | | Active | |
| 325 | APO GPAA | APO Gamma Pi Alumni Association | Apr 22, 2017 | Baguio | | Active | |
| 326 | CANAPOAA | Camarines Norte APO Alumni Association | Apr 22, 2017 | Daet, Camarines Norte | | Active | |
| 327 | APO MAA | APO Manitoba Alumni Association | Apr 22, 2017 | Manitoba, Canada | | Active | |
| 328 | APO DRAA | APO Delta Rho Alumni Association | Apr 22, 2017 | Naga, Camarines Sur | | Active | |
| 329 | APO PAA | APO Pi Alumni Association | Apr 22, 2017 | Sampaloc, Manila | | Active | |
| 330 | APO WAA | APO Wato Alumni Association | Apr 22, 2017 | Lanao del Sur | | Active | |
| 331 | APO CCAA | APO Cavite City Alumni Association | Apr 22, 2017 | Cavite City | | Active | |
| 332 | APO SABAC AA | Samahang Alpha Phi Omega ng Bacoor Alumni Association | Apr 22, 2017 | Bacoor, Cavite | | Active | |
| 333 | APO MIAA | APO Manila International Airport Alumni Association | Apr 22, 2017 | Pasay | | Active | |
| 334 | APO KTAA | APO Kappa Theta Alumni Association | May 13, 2017 | Davao City | | Active | |
| 335 | APO MMAA | APO Mandaue-Mactan Alumni Association | May 13, 2017 | Cebu City | | Active | |
| 336 | APO DTAA | APO Delta Theta Alumni Association | May 13, 2017 | Pagadian City | ZPAR | Active | |
| 337 | APO MAA | APO Marshland Alumni Association | May 13, 2017 | Bunawan, Agusan del Sur | | Active | |
| 338 | APO QAA | APO Quirino Alumni Association | May 13, 2017 | Quirino | | Active | |
| 339 | APO QAA | APO Qassim Alumni Association | May 13, 2017 | Qassim, Saudi Arabia | | Active | |
| 340 | APOPAA | APO Polangui Alumni Association | Jan 21, 2018 | Polangui, Albay | | Active | |
| 341 | APOPAA | APO Polomolok Alumni Association | Jan 21, 2018 | Polomolok | | Active | |
| 342 | APOUVAA | APO Upper Valley Alumni Association | Jan 21, 2018 | South Cotabato, Soccsksargen | | Active | |
| 343 | APOMDAA | APO Mu Delta Alumni Association | Apr 22, 2018 | Quezon City | | Active | |
| 344 | APOSDAA | APO Sto. Domingo Alumni Association | Apr 22, 2018 | Santo Domingo, Nueva Ecija | | Active | |
| 345 | APO SAF AA | APO St. Andrew's Field Alumni Association | Apr 22, 2018 | San Andres, Manila | | Active | |
| 346 | APOCIAA | APO City of Ilagan Alumni Association | April 22, 2018 | Ilagan, Isabela | | Active | |
| 347 | APO DAA | APO Diwata Alumni Association | Jul 22, 2018 | Agusan del Sur | | Active | |
| 348 | APO VBAA | APO Virginia Beach Alumni Association | Jul 22, 2018 | Virginia Beach, Virginia, US | | Active | |
| 349 | APO SIAA | APO South Island Alumni Association | Oct 21, 2018 | Christchurch, Canterbury, New Zealand | | Active | |
| 350 | APO TZAA | APO Theta Zeta Alumni Association | Oct 21, 2018 | Tacloban City | | Active | |
| 351 | APO NAA | APO Nova Alumni Association | Oct 21, 2018 | Novaliches, Quezon City | | Active | |
| 352 | APO BSAA | APO Beta Sigma Alumni Association | Oct 21, 2018 | San Miguel, Manila | | Active | |
| 353 | APO MAA | APO Malate Alumni Association | Feb 13, 2019 | Malate, Manila | NCAR | Active | |
| 354 | APO NNAA | APO Nagoya-Nihon Alumni Association | Feb 13, 2019 | Nagoya, Chūbu, Japan | ARA | Active | |
| 355 | APO SJAA | APO San Juan Alumni Association | Mar 23, 2019 | San Juan City | | Active | |
| 356 | APO PAA | APO Paniqui Alumni Association | Mar 23, 2019 | Paniqui, Tarlac | NLAR | Active | |
| 357 | APO KSAA | APO Kalookan South Alumni Association | Apr 14, 2019 | | NCAR | Active | |
| 358 | APO PDSAA | APO Pamayanang Diego Silang Alumni Association | Apr 14, 2019 | | NCAR | Active | |
| 359 | APO CAA | APO Carmona Alumni Association | Apr 14, 2019 | | STAR | Active | |
| 360 | APO CAA | APO Calauan Alumni Association | Apr 14, 2019 | | STAR | Active | |
| 361 | APO OBAA | APO Obando Alumni Association | Apr 14, 2019 | | NLAR | Active | |
| 362 | APO TDAA | APO Theta Delta Alumni Association | Apr 14, 2019 | | NLAR | Active | |
| 363 | APO Theta Omega AA | APO Theta Omega Alumni Association | May 23, 2019 | | | Active | |
| 364 | APO Iota Alpha AA | APO Iota Alpha Alumni Association | May 23, 2019 | | | Active | |
| 365 | APO CHEF AA, SMAR | APO Chef Alumni Association, SMAR | May 23, 2019 | | | Active | |
| 366 | APO Bayanihan Los Angeles AA | APO Bayanihan Los Angeles Alumni Association | May 23, 2019 | | | Active | |
| 367 | APO DAHOM LAGONOY AA | APO Dahom Logonoy Alumni Association | May 23, 2019 | | | Active | |
| 368 | APO GUBAT AA | APO Gubat Alumni Association | May 23, 2019 | | | Active | |
| 369 | MACU APO PILI AA | Macu APO PILI Alumni Association | May 23, 2019 | | | Active | |
| 370 | APO BULAN AA | APO Bulan Alumni Association | May 23, 2019 | | | Active | |
| 371 | APO CONCEPCION AA | APO Cconcepcion Alumni Association | May 23, 2019 | | | Active | |
| 378 | APO Rho AA | APO Rho Alumni Association | Apr 25, 2021 | Santa Mesa, Manila | | Active | |
| 379 | APO Beta Alpha AA | APO Beta Alpha Alumni Association | Apr 25, 2021 | Quezon City | | Active | |
| 380 | APO Lambda Gamma AA | APO Lambda Gamma Alumni Association | Apr 25, 2021 | Candon City | | Active | |
| 381 | APO Nu Kappa AA | APO Nu Kappa Alumni Association | Apr 25, 2021 | Caloocan | | Active | |
| 382 | APO Eta Kappa AA | APO Eta Kappa Alumni Association | Apr 25, 2021 | Intramuros, Manila | | Active | |
| 383 | APO Beta Rho AA | APO Beta Rho Alumni Association | Apr 25, 2021 | Cotabato City | | Active | |
| 384 | APO Gamma Lambda AA | APO Gamma Lambda AA | Apr 25, 2021 | Roxas, Oriental Mindoro | | Active | |
| 385 | APO Delta Phi AA | APO Delta Phi AA | Apr 25, 2021 | Tacloban City | | Active | |
| 386 | APO AFPDD AA | APO Armed Forces of the Philippines Department of Defense Alumni Association | Apr 25, 2021 | Quezon City | | Active | |
| 387 | APO Marino AA | APO Marino Alumni Association | Apr 25, 2021 | Ermita, Manila | NCAR | Active | (Note: This is a professional association for members of the maritime industries.) |
| 388 | APO Maasin City AA | APO Maasin City Alumni Association | Apr 25, 2021 | Leyte | | Active | |
| 389 | APO Municipality AA | APO Municipality of Alicia, San Mateo and Angadanan Alumni Association | Apr 25, 2021 | Isabela, Basilan | | Active | |
| 390 | APO Montreal AA | APO Montreal Alumni Association | Apr 25, 2021 | Montreal, Quebec, Canada | | Active | |
| 391 | APO Nagcarian AA | APO Nagcarian Alumni Association | Apr 25, 2021 | Nagcarian, Laguna | | Active | |
| 392 | APO Bansud AA | APO Bansud Alumni Association | Apr 25, 2021 | Oriental Mindoro, Mimaropa | | Active | |
| 393 | APO Candelaria AA | APO Candelaria Alumni Association | Apr 25, 2021 | Candelaria, Quezon | | Active | |
| 394 | APO Lucban AA | APO Lucban Alumni Association | Apr 25, 2021 | Lucban, Quezon | | Active | |
| 404 | APO Al Ahsa AA | APO Al Ahsa Alumni Association | Jan 23, 2022 | Al-Ahsa Governorate, Saudi Arabia | ARME | Active | |
| 415 | APO DT AA | APO Delta Tau Alumni Association | Apr 22, 2023 | University of the San Agustin, Iloilo | WVAR | Active | |
| 420 | APO KGAA | APO Kappa Gamma Alumni Association | Apr 22, 2023 | University of the Philippines in the Visayas | | Active | |
| 432 | APO Zeta Omicron AA | APO Zeta Omicron Alumni Association | May 13, 2023 | | ARME | Active | |
| 453 | APO TB AA | APO Tanod Baybayin Alumni Association | Jul 17, 2024 | Port Area, Manila | NCAR | Active | |

== See also ==
- List of Alpha Phi Omega Philippines members
