= List of Alpha Phi Omega Philippines members =

List of Alpha Phi Omega national conventions Alpha Phi Omega Philippines is a service fraternity and sorority headquartered in Quezon City, National Capital Region, Philippines. It was established in 1950 as a national chapter of Alpha Phi Omega, a co-ed service fraternity in the United States that was founded at Lafayette College in 1925 by former members of the Boy Scouts of America. The fraternity incoporated in the Philippines in 1953 and now operates as a separate and independent organization. Alpha Phi Omega Philippines began accepting women into its related sorority in 1965, later merging to become Alpha Phi Omega International Philippines Incorporated Service Fraternity and Sorority.

The following is a list of some of the notable members of the Alpha Phi Omega Philippines chapters.

== Academia ==
Name	Original chapter and year	Notability	Ref.
Oscar L. Evangelista	Eta 1954	Professor, vice chancellor for community affairs, dean of students, and dean of the College of Education at the University of the Philippines Diliman	
Nemesio Prudente	Eta Omicron 1991, honorary	President of the Philippine College of Commerce and President of the Polytechnic University of the Philippines	
Nestor Vinluan	Eta 1968	Artist, professor emeritus and dean of the College of Fine Arts at the University of the Philippines Diliman	

== Business and nonprofits ==
Name	Original chapter and year	Notability	Ref.
Maximino J. Edralin Jr.	Epsilon 1952	Pioneer in journalism and public relations in the Philippines	
Guillermo R. Padolina	Beta 1950	National Scout Director of the Boy Scouts of the Philippines (1954–1956), Regional Executive Commissioner of the Far East Scout Region of the World Scout Bureau	
Tommy Pangcoga	Zeta Omega 1989	Writer, training and project development officer of Consortium of Bangsamoro Civil Society, and executive director of Kabataang Mindanao Para sa Kapayapaan (Mindanao Youth for Peace)	

== Entertainment ==
Name	Original chapter and year	Notability	Ref.
Sari Dalena	Eta 1990	Independent filmmaker, professor at the University of the Philippines Film Institute	
Lav Diaz	Beta Psi 1977	Filmmaker and film critic	
Nikki Cabardo	Eta	Keyboardist for Freestyle and Sinosikat?	
Menggie Cobarrubias	Eta 1970	Actor, received the Gawad Urian Award for Best Supporting Actor in 1979	
John Lesaca	Eta 1972	Violinist	
Rogelio Ordoñez	Mu 1961	Fiction writer, poet, and journalist	

== Law ==
Name	Original chapter and year	Notability	Ref.
Nina Antonio-Valenzuela	Eta 1983	Associate Justice of the Court of Appeals of the Philippines (2010–present)	
Alicia Austria-Martinez	Eta	Associate Justice of the Supreme Court of the Philippines (2002–2008), Associate Justice of the Court of Appeals of the Philippines	
Josue Bellosillo	Eta 1956	Associate Justice of the Supreme Court of the Philippines (1992c1999), Senior Associate Justice of the Supreme Court of the Philippines (1999–2003)	
Minita Chico-Nazario	Eta	Associate Justice of the Supreme Court of the Philippines (2004–2009), Presiding Justice of the Sandiganbayan (2002–2004), Associate Justice of the Sandiganbayan (1993–2002)	
Jose R. Hernandez	Eta 1964	Associate Justice of the Sandiganbayan	
Consuelo Ynares-Santiago	Eta 1961	Associate Justice of the Supreme Court of the Philippines (1999–2008)	

== Literature ==
Name	Original chapter and year	Notability	Ref.
Rogelio Ordoñez	Mu 1961	Fiction writer, poet, and journalist	
Bienvenido De la Paz	Alpha Theta 1976	Writer and editor; recipient of the Premio Zobel	

== Politics ==
=== Executive ===
Name	Original chapter and year	Notability	Ref.
Jejomar Binay	Eta 1960	Vice President of the Philippines (2010–2016), Mayor of Makati (1986–1998, 2001–2010), Chairman of the Metropolitan Manila Development Authority (1998–2001), Governor of Metro Manila (1987–1988), 3rd chairman of Housing and Urban Development Coordinating Council (2010–2015)	
Fidel V. Ramos	Pi 1991, honorary	President of the Philippines (1992–1998), Secretary of National Defense (1988–1991), Chief of Staff of the Armed Forces of the Philippines (1986–1988)	

=== Senate ===
Name	Original chapter and year	Notability	Ref.
Franklin Drilon	Mu 1992, honorary	President of the Senate of the Philippines (2000–2006, 2013–2016), Senator of the Philippines (1995–2022), Executive Secretary of the Philippines (1991–1992)	
Juan Ponce Enrile	Beta Xi 1986, honorary	President of the Senate of the Philippines (2008–2013), Chief Presidential Legal Counsel (2022–2025), Minority Floor Leader of the Senate of the Philippines (1987–1992, 2013–2014, 2015–2016), Senate of the Philippines (1987–1992, 1995–2001, 2004–2016), House of Representatives of the Philippines (1992–1995), 15th Minister of National Defense (1972–1986), Interim Batasang Pambansa (1978–1984)	
Raul Manglapus	Alpha 1958, honorary	Secretary of Foreign Affairs (1987–1992), Senator of the Philippines (1961–1967, 1987–1992)	
Bong Revilla	Delta Kappa 2001, honorary	Senate of the Philippines (2004–2016, 2019–2025) and Governor of Cavite (1998–2001)	

=== House ===
Name	Original chapter and year	Notability	Ref.
Wahab Akbar	Lambda	House of Representatives of the Philippines (2007) and Governor of Basilan (1998–2007)	
Bella Angara	Eta 1958	House of Representatives of the Philippines (1995–2004, 2013–2019), Majority Floor Leader of the House of Representatives of the Philippines (2000–2001), Governor of Aurora (2004–2013)	
Yasser Balindong	Beta Rho 1991	House of Representatives of the Philippines (2019–present), ARMM Regional Legislative Assembly (2005–2016)	
Romy Batuumpar	Alpha Kappa	House of Representatives of the Philippines	
Eladio Caliwara	Chi & Gamma Omega-1982	House of Representatives of the Philippines approx 1962 and Vice Governor of Quezon	
Antonio Cerilles	Delta 1999	House of Representatives of the Philippines (1987–1998, 2004–2007), Secretary of Environment and Natural Resources (1998–2001), Governor of Zamboanga del Sur (2010–2019)	
David A. Ponce De Leon	Theta Chi	House of Representatives of the Philippines (1987–1995), Lieutenant Governor of Palawan (1986–1987, 2001–20xx?)	
Carol Jane Lopez	Gamma Epsilon	House of Representatives of the Philippines (2007–2016)	
Eduardo P. Pilapil	Alpha Theta 1965	House of Representatives of the Philippines (1987–1992); Postmaster General	
Bai Sandra Sema	Beta Upsilon	House of Representatives of the Philippines (2013–2019)	
Augusto L. Syjuco	Epsilon 1961	House of Representatives of the Philippines (1998–2004, 2010–2013)	
Ruben Torres	Mu 1992, honorary	House of Representatives of the Philippines (2001–2004), Executive Secretary of the Philippines (1995–1998), Secretary of Labor and Employment (1990–1992)	
Bongarsa Tomawis	Zeta Psi 1986	House of Representatives of the Philippines	
Jose de Venecia Jr.	Alpha Gamma 1992, honorary	Speaker of the Philippine House of Representatives (1992–1998, 2001–2008), House of Representatives of the Philippines (1969–1979, 1987–1998, 2001–2010)	
Manuel E. Zamora	Beta Phi 1968	House of Representatives of the Philippines (2001–2010, 2019–2022), Mayor of Monkayo (2022–2025), and Vice Governor of Compostela Valley (2013–2019)	

=== Government offices ===
Name	Original chapter and year	Notability	Ref.
Silvestre Bello III	Mu 1965	Philippine Representative to Taiwan (2022–2024), Secretary of Labor and Employment (2016–2022), Cabinet Secretary of the Philippines (2004–2010), Solicitor General of the Philippines (1996–1998), Secretary of Justice (1991–1992, 1998)	
Salvador Britanico	Alpha 1956	Batasang Pambansa; Minister of Transportation and Communications; Deputy Minister of Education, Culture, and Sports (1982); 1973 Constitutional convention delegate	
Julio F. Desamito	Eta 1953	Commission on Elections (1995–2001)	
Gilberto F. Layese	Theta 1964	Director of the Bureau of Agriculture and Fisheries Product Standards of the Department of Agriculture (Philippines) (2001– 2010)	
Roberto Pagdanganan	Mu 1987, honorary	Secretary of Tourism (2004), Secretary of Agrarian Reform (2003–2004), Governor of Bulacan (1986–1998), and president of the Boy Scouts of the Philippines (1996–1997)	
Jesse Robredo	Alpha Nu 1992	Secretary of the Interior and Local Government (2010–2012), Mayor of Naga (1988–1998, 2001–2010)	
Maria Gracia Pulido Tan	Eta 1973	Independent Audit Advisory Committee of the United Nations (2014–2019), chairman of the Commission on Audit of the Philippines (2011–2015), commissioner of the Presidential Commission on Good Government; law instructor at the University of the Philippines Diliman	
Jesus Verzosa	Eta 1972	Chief of the Philippine National Police (2008–2019)	
Haydee Yorac	Eta 1959	Chairperson of the Commission on Elections (1989–1991), Commission on Elections (1986–1993), and Chairperson of the Presidential Commission on Good Government (2001–2005); vice-chancellor for academic affairs of the University of the Philippines	

=== State and local ===
Name	Original chapter and year	Notability	Ref.
Mamintal Adiong Jr.	Alpha Kappa	Governor of Lanao del Sur (2007–2016, 2019–present), Vice Governor of Lanao del Sur (2016–2019)	
Robert Lyndon Barbers	Epsilon Gamma, honorary	Governor of Surigao del Norte (2022–present)	
Buenaventura Buenafe	Epsilon 1955	Governor of Abra (1987–1988)	
Jose Catindig	Sigma	Mayor of Santa Rosa, Laguna (2005–2007), Vice Mayor of Santa Rosa, Laguna (2001–2005), Councilor of Santa Rosa, Laguna (2022–present)	
Julius Caesar F. Herrera	Alpha Mu 1969	Vice Governor of Bohol (2001–present), Mayor of Calape, Bohol (1995–2001)	
