= Tommy Pangcoga =

Filipino writer and nonprofit officer

Ahmed Harris Ramuros Pangcoga (born 21 April 1972), best known as Tommy Pangcoga, is a writer and non-government organization worker based in Mindanao, the Philippines.

He was the Training and Project Development Officer of Consortium of Bangsamoro Civil Society, the largest civil society organization (CSO) composed of Moro non-governmental organizations (NGOs) and people's organizations (POs) from 2007 to 2010.

He was a president of Kaakbay Tri-People Youth Dialogue, a non-stock, non-profit, non-government cross-sectoral youth organization. and executive director of Kabataang Mindanao Para sa Kapayapaan (KAMINKAP) or Mindanao Youth for Peace, a local youth-oriented NGO that focused on the propagation of the Culture of Peace. He was also a consultant to Catholic Relief Services in Mindanao.

Pangcoga is an ethnic Maranao, one of the several multilingual ethnic groups comprising the Moro people, the largest mainly non-Christian group in the Philippines.

He is a member of Alpha Phi Omega.

== See also ==
- Bangsamoro
- Sabah dispute
- Moro people
- Muslim Southeast Asia
