= Eastern Visayas State University =

Public university in Tacloban, Philippines

- Pamantasang Pampamahalaan ng Silangang Visayas (Filipino)
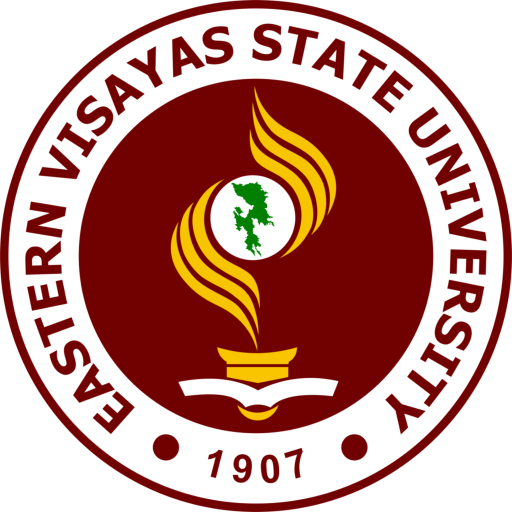
- Former names: Leyte Provincial School (1907-1915); Leyte Trade School (1915-1953); National Provincial Trade School (1953-1961); Leyte Regional School of Arts and Trades (1961-1965); Leyte Institute of Technology (1965-2004)
- Type: Regional state higher education institution
- Established: 1907; 119 years ago
- Affiliations: Philippine Association of State Universities and Colleges; State Colleges and Universities Athletic Association
- Chairman: J. Prospero de Vera III
- President: Dr. Dennis C. de Paz
- Vice-president: Dr. Lydia M. Morante (VP for Academic Affairs); Dr. Analyn C. Españo (VP for Research, Development & Extension Services); Dr. Benedicto T. Militante, Jr. (VP for Administration & Finance)
- Dean: Ar. Charlotte B. Montaño (College of Architecture & Allied Discipline); Dr. Glenda B. Tupaz (College of Arts and Sciences); Dr. Rose Anna L. Rufuerzo (College of Business & Entrepreneurship); Dr. Jovito B. Madeja (College of Education); Dr. Vinyl H. Oquino (College of Engineering); Prof. Bernard Niño Q. Membrebe (College of Technology)
- Location: Tacloban, Philippines; 11°14′19″N 124°59′51″E
- Campus: Main Campus; Tacloban City Satellite Campuses; Burauen Campus; Carigara Campus; Dulag Campus; Ormoc Campus; Tanauan Campus
- Hymn: EVSU Hymn
- Colors: Maroon and White
- Nickname: EVSU Eagles
- Website: www.evsu.edu.ph
- Location in the Visayas Location in the Philippines

Eastern Visayas State University (EVSU; Waray: Universidad han Estado ha Sinirangan Bisayas; Cebuano: Pangkagamhanang Kinatumhaan sa Sidlakang Bisayas; Tagalog: Pamantasang Pampamahalaan ng Silangang Bisayas; Spanish: Universidad Estatal de Bisayas Orientales) is a regional state higher education institution in Tacloban, Philippines. It is the oldest higher educational institution in the Eastern Visayas region. It is mandated to provide advanced education, higher technological, professional instruction and training in trade, fishery, agriculture, forestry, science, education, commerce, architecture, engineering, education (elementary and secondary) and related courses. It is also mandated to undertake research and extension services, and provide progressive leadership in its area of specialization. Its main campus is in Tacloban.

== History ==
The Eastern Visayas State University had its humble beginnings in 1907, as a part of the Leyte Provincial School. It became a separate entity in 1915, and was named the Leyte Trade School, funded by the provincial government. In 1953, after 38 years, it was renamed the National Provincial Trade School by virtue of Republic Act No. 406 and funded jointly by the National and Provincial Government to cover a wider curriculum. In 1961, the Congress of the Philippines passed Republic Act No. 1561, converting the school into the Leyte Regional School of Arts and Trades, authorizing it to become a training institution for vocational and industrial education in Eastern Visayas.

On June 19, 1965, Republic Act 4572 was enacted by Congress of the Philippines which converted the school further into a chartered college, renaming it the Leyte Institute of Technology. It took effect beginning school year 1965-66.

Starting in 1999, the institute has grown to establish a satellite campus in Ormoc City. Pursuant to Board Resolutions No. 59, series of 1999, two CHED supervised institutions (CSIs) in Leyte, namely the Leyte College of Arts and Trades and the Burauen Polytechnic College were integrated to the Leyte Institute of Technology. The LIT Dulag Campus started in SY 2000–2001. The Carigara School of Fisheries was added, the second phase of CSIs institution to SUCs.

On August 7, 2004, Republic Act No. 9311 was passed converting the Leyte Institute of Technology, into Eastern Visayas State University.

== Academics ==
Programs Offered

=== School of Architecture and Allied Discipline ===
- Bachelor of Science in Architecture (BSAr)
- Bachelor of Science in Interior Design (BSID)

=== School of Arts and Sciences ===
- Bachelor of Science in Economics
- Batsilyer ng Sining sa Filipino
- Bachelor of Arts in English Language (BAEL)
- Bachelor of Science in Mathematics (BSMath)
- Bachelor of Science in Environmental Science (BSES)
- Bachelor of Science in Chemistry (BSChem)
- Bachelor of Science in Statistics (BSStat)

=== School Accountancy, Management and Entrepreneurship ===
- Bachelor of Science in Entrepreneurship (BSE)
- Bachelor of Science in Office Administration (BSOA)
- Bachelor of Science in Accountancy (BSA)
- Bachelor of Science in Marketing (BSM)

=== School of Education ===
- Bachelor of Secondary Education (BSEd) major in:
  - Mathematics
  - Science
- Bachelor of Culture & Arts Education (BCAEd)
- Bachelor of Physical Education (BPEd)
- Bachelor in Elementary Education (BEED)
- Bachelor of Technical-Vocational Teacher Education (BTVTEd) major in:
  - Food and Service Management (FSM)
  - Civil and Construction
  - Automotive Technology (AT)
  - Electrical Technology (ET)
  - Garments, Fashion & Design (GFD)
  - Heating, Ventilating, Air-Conditioning and Refrigeration Technology
- Bachelor of Technology & Livelihood Education (BTLEd) major in:
  - Industrial Arts (IA)
  - Home Economics (HE)
- Diploma in Teaching Secondary (DTS)

=== School of Engineering ===
- Bachelor of Science in Chemical Engineering (BSChE)
- Bachelor of Science in Civil Engineering (BSCE)
- Bachelor of Science in Electrical Engineering (BSEE)
- Bachelor of Science in Electronics Engineering (BSECE)
- Bachelor of Science in Geodetic Engineering (BSGE)
- Bachelor of Science in Mechanical Engineering (BSME)
- Bachelor of Science in Industrial Engineering (BSIE)
- Bachelor of Science in Information Technology (BSIT)

=== School of Technology ===
- Bachelor of Science in Hospitality Management (BSHM)
- Bachelor of Science in Nutrition & Dietetics (BSND)
- Bachelor of Industrial Technology (BIndTech)
- Bachelor of Science in Mechanical Technology with major in:
  - Automotive
  - Metallurgy
  - Machine Shop
  - Welding and Fabrication

=== Colleges, Schools, Campuses and Centers ===
College/School/Center	Abbreviation	Year founded	Campus
School of Architecture and Allied Disciplines	SAAD	1980	Tacloban
School of Arts and Sciences	SAS	1982	Tacloban
School of Accountancy, Management and Entrepreneurship	SAME	2002	Tacloban
School of Education	SoEd	2002	Tacloban
School of Engineering	SoE	1966	Tacloban
School of Technology	SoT	2002	Tacloban
Graduate School	GS	1973	Tacloban
College of Agri-Tourism and Forestry	CATF	1999	Burauen
College of Fisheries, Aquatic Resources, and Marine Sciences	CFARMS	-	Carigara
College of Trades, Craftsmanship, and Entrepreneurship	CTCE	-	Tanauan
College of Engineering and Information and Communications Technology	CEICT	1999	Ormoc
Dulag Community Satellite Campus	DCSC	2000	Dulag
Secondary Laboratory School**	SLS	-	Tacloban
Regional Metrology and Robotics Laboratory Center*	RMRLC	2012	Tacloban
Eastern Visayas Food Innovation Center*	EVFIC	2015	Tacloban
Information Technology Training and Development Center*	ITTDC	-	Tacloban
^{*}—Serves as laboratory/research center and does offer any degree programs.^{**}—Laboratory high school for the EVSU College of Education.
