= Polytechnic University of the Philippines Unisan =

Public university in Quezon, Philippines

Polytechnic University of the Philippines Unisan Branch
- Politeknikong Unibersidad ng Pilipinas sa Unisan (Filipino)
- Motto: Tanglaw ng Bayan
- Type: Satellite campus
- Established: 1987
- President: Manuel Muhi
- Director: Edwin G. Malabuyoc
- Location: Unisan, Quezon, Philippines; 13°50′45″N 121°58′09″E
- University hymn: Imno ng PUP (PUP Hymn)
- Colors: Maroon and Gold
- Website: www.pup.edu.ph
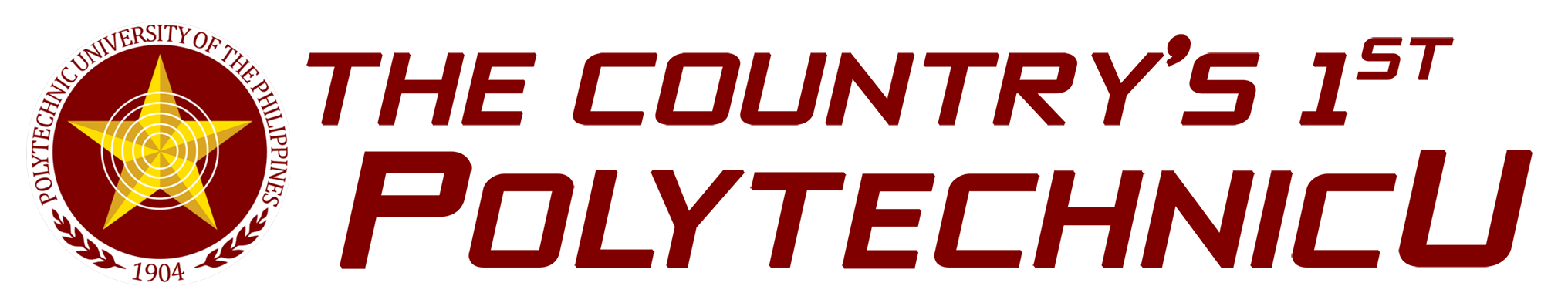

- Location in Luzon Location in the Philippines

Polytechnic University of the Philippines, Unisan Extension or PUP-UQ (Filipino: Politeknikong Unibersidad ng Pilipinas, Lungsod ng Unisan) is a satellite campus of the Polytechnic University of the Philippines located in the municipality of Unisan, Quezon, Philippines, offering eleven courses, one diploma program and undergraduate programs.

== History ==
PUP Unisan, formerly PUP Technical School-Unisan, was conceived in 1986 with some local officials who wanted to establish a school in Unisan as their contribution to the welfare of the out-of-school youth.

PUP Unisan was established in 1987 as a vocational-technical school offering short-term courses such as secretarial, fashion, food technology, automotive, refrigeration, radio & TV and practical electricity. Without a building of its own, the branch used the old Gabaldon building of Unisan Central while a new building with three classrooms was constructed in 1988. The OIC at that time was Prof. Visitacion D. Abrigo from Sta. Maria, Bulacan. She was assisted by another faculty member from the university, Prof. Violeta L. Ratcho, acting as the Academic Head and Registrar.

In 1988 two new courses were added: Computer and Driving when PUP was under the administration of Prof. Roberto C. Laguatan from Lopez, Quezon.

After a brief period of four years, through the leadership of the then-Director Prof. Violeta L. Ratcho, PUP Technical was granted junior college status by the university President Dr. Nemesio E. Prudente. In June 1991, the branch registered 65 qualified freshmen to its two-year ladderized course leading to the Bachelor of Business Education.

With the financial aid given in 1993, the branch was allowed by the President of university to offer an undergraduate course in Business Education and with the budget released, a one-story, four-classroom building was constructed in 1994 in a 2.5-hectare (6.2-acre) lot donated by the municipality of Unisan to PUP.

== Courses ==
College of Education (COED)

- Bachelor of Elementary Education (BEEd)
- Bachelor of Business Teacher Education (BBTE)
- Bachelor of Science in Information Technology (BSIT)

College of Business (CB)

- Bachelor of Science in Entrepreneurial Management (BSEM)
- Bachelor of Science in entrepreneurship (BSE)

Master's degrees

- Master in Educational Management (Open University, distance education)
- Master in Public Administration (Open University, distance education)
