= Consortium of Bangsamoro Civil Society =

Umbrella organization in the Philippines

- Headquarters: Cotabato City, Philippines
- Chairperson Secretary General: Guiamel M. Alim; Sammy P. Maulana
- Website: http://www.cbcsi.org

Consortium of Bangsamoro Civil Society, abbreviated as CBCS, is the largest umbrella civil society organization (CSO) composed of 168 Moro non-governmental organizations (NGOs) and peoples organizations (POs) in Mindanao, Philippines.

== Activities and Positions ==
=== Human Rights ===
In October 2007, the CBCS was one of the speakers in a forum participated by other civil society groups and lawyers which discussed and reviewed the soundness of Philippine Republic Act 9372, otherwise known as the Human Security Act of 2007. The civil society representatives in the forum said that the Human Security Act puts at risk the gains of dialogue and peaceful approach to the conflict in Mindanao.

In February 2008, the CBCS questioned whether the Balikatan (shoulder- to-shoulder) joint military exercises between the United States and the Philippines have improved the Armed Forces’ capability in fighting terrorism and insurgency in Mindanao. Sammy Maulana, the Secretary-General of CBCS, claimed that for years, US troops have been training Filipino soldiers but this has not addressed the rising number of civilians allegedly killed from military operations, worsening human rights violation, and increasing collateral damages.

=== Mindanao Peace Process ===
In May 2008, the CBCS was among the civil society groups which expressed concerns over the withdrawal of the Malaysian contingent from the international monitoring team which oversees the peace process between the Philippine government and the Moro Islamic Liberation Front (MILF).

In August 2008, when the Philippine Supreme Court issued a Temporary Restraining Order against the signing of the Memorandum of Agreement on Ancestral Domain (MOA-AD) between the Philippine government and the MILF in Malaysia, the CBCS was one of the civil society groups which separately filed motions for reconsideration. The court denied their appeal declaring as unconstitutional the memorandum and junked their motions.

In October 2008, about 500 members of the CBCS staged a peaceful rally in Marawi City, calling on the United Nations and the Organization of Islamic Conference to intervene and mediate to end the war in Mindanao and intercede for the just resolution of the Bangsamoro struggle for the right to self-determination.

=== Election in the Autonomous Region in Muslim Mindanao ===
The CBCS was one of the civil society groups which closely monitored the elections in the ARMM in August 2008.

== Structure and Organization ==
The CBCS system consists of:

=== General Assembly ===
It is composed of individual NGO/PO members who constitute the highest governing-making body and meets once every two years. These are organizations that believe in the cause of justice, peace, human rights and equitable development.

=== Council of Leaders ===
It is composed of representatives from the regional formation whose tasks is to provide specific and concrete guidelines to the implementation of policies formulate by the GA. The COL meets twice a year.

=== Executive Committee (ExeCom) ===
It is composed of officials chosen from the Council of Leaders (CoL): The chairperson, Vice Chairperson for External, Vice Chairperson for Internal, Treasurer, Auditor, Secretary-General, and Deputy Secretary-General. The ExeCom meets four times a year to review policies for the decision of the COL.

=== Regional Management Committees ===
It is a sub-formation of CBCS at the regional level. It is a clustering of member-organizations per region. There are eight (8) Regional Formations in CBCS. This structuring was developed in order for member-organizations located within a given region to work together in addressing regional situations affecting the Bangsamoro therein, while pursuing Mindanao-wide and national issues together with the rest of the CBCS membership in the other regions.

=== Secretariat ===
It acts as the workforce for CBCS. Its staff members are responsible for coordinating regional programs, provide and facilitate technical and funding support and administrative functions for the CBCS, including drafting proposals and writing reports. The secretariat is headed by the Secretary-General, who visits each CBCS region every month or more often as the need arises.

== Publications ==
- Bangsamoro Journal - a quarterly magazine supported by Stiftung für Kinder, a children's foundation based in Germany.
- Bangsamoro Updates - a monthly newsletter

== Affiliation ==
In 2006, the CBCS was elected as a core member of Civil Society Advisory Committee (CSAC) of the United Nations Country Team in the Philippines.

The following are the other organizations where the CBCS is affiliated with:

- Invisible Link - an informal coalition of civil society organizations in Mindanao
- Mindanao Peaceweavers - a convergence of peace advocates advancing a peaceful resolution of the conflict in Mindanao

== Partner Organizations ==
- Nonviolent Peaceforce - nonpartisan unarmed peacekeeping organisation composed of trained civilians from around the world
- Initiatives for International Dialogue - a solidarity and advocacy group involved primarily in peoples' issues in East Timor, Burma and Mindanao in the Philippines

== See also ==
- Bangsamoro
- Moro people
- Sabah dispute
- Muslim Southeast Asia
- Moro National Liberation Front
- Moro Islamic Liberation Front
