= List of universities in Lebanon =

Lebanon has a diverse higher-education system that includes public and private universities, as well as university institutes and colleges. According to the Lebanese Ministry of Education and Higher Education, the country has 20 universities listed in its official register of legally licensed higher-education institutions, in addition to 21 university institutes and colleges listed separately. The country’s only public university is the Lebanese University. Lebanon’s oldest and best-known universities include the American University of Beirut (AUB), founded in 1866, and Saint Joseph University of Beirut (USJ), founded in 1875. Universities in Lebanon offer programs in Arabic, English, and French, reflecting the country’s multilingual higher-education environment.

This is a list of universities and related institutions in Lebanon.

== Universities ==
| Institute name | Acronym | Date founded | Official registration notes |
|---|---|---|---|
| City University | CITYU | 1991 | Yes |
| Académie Libanaise des Beaux-Arts^ | ALBA | 1937 | Yes |
| Al-Kafaàt University | AKU | 1999 | Yes |
| Al Maaref University | MU | 2015 | |
| American University of Beirut | AUB | 1866 | Yes |
| American University of Culture & Education | AUCE | 2000 | Yes |
| American University of Science and Technology | AUST | 1989 | Yes |
| American University of Technology | AUT | 1998 | Yes |
| Antonine University | UA | 1996 | Yes |
| Arab Open University | AOU | 2002 | Yes |
| Arts, Sciences and Technology University in Lebanon | AUL | 1998 | Yes |
| Beirut Arab University | BAU | 1960 | Yes |
| Beirut Islamic University | BIU | 1982 | Yes |
| Conservatoire National des Arts et Métiers | Cnam | 1971 (1794 in Paris) | Yes |
| East International University, (formerly Azm University) | EIU | 2015 | |
| Ecole Superieure des Affaires (ESA Business School) | ESA | 1996 | Yes |
| Global University | GU | 1992 | Yes |
| Haigazian University | HU | 1955 | Yes |
| Islamic University of Lebanon | IUL | 1996 | Yes |
| Jinan University (Lebanon) | JU | 1988 | Yes |
| Lebanese American University | LAU | 1924 | Yes |
| Lebanese Canadian University | LCU | 2003 | Yes |
| Lebanese German University | LGU | 2008 | Yes |
| Lebanese International University | LIU | 2001 | Yes |
| Lebanese National Higher Conservatory of Music | LNHCM | 1995 | |
| Lebanese University | UL | 1951 | Yes |
| Makassed University of Beirut | MUB | 1986 | Yes |
| Middle East University | MEU | 1939 | Yes |
| Modern University for Business and Science | MUBS | 2000 | Yes |
| Notre Dame University - Louaize | NDU | 1987 | Yes |
| Phoenicia University | PU | 2015 | |
| Rafik Hariri University | RHU | 1999 | |
| Saint George University of Beirut | SGU | 2020 | |
| Saint Joseph University of Beirut | USJ | 1875 | Yes |
| Tripoli University Institute for Islamic Studies | UT | 1986 | Yes |
| Université La Sagesse | ULS | 1999 | Yes |
| Université Libano-Française de Technologie et des Sciences Appliqués | ULF | 1997 | Yes |
| University of Balamand | UoB | 1988 | Yes |
| University of Sciences & Arts in Lebanon | USAL | 2012 | |
| Université Saint-Esprit de Kaslik | USEK | 1950 | Yes |
| Université Sainte Famille | USF | 2000 | Yes |

^Affiliated to Balamand University.

== University institutes and colleges ==
| Institute name | Acronym | Date founded | Official registration notes |
|---|---|---|---|
| Joyaa University Institute of Technology | JUIT | 1964 | Yes |
| Ouzai University College | OUC | 1976 | Yes |
| Matn University College | MUC | 1999 | Yes |
| Sidoon University College | SUC | 2000 | Yes |

== University institutes for religious studies ==
| Institute name | Acronym | Date founded | Official registration notes |
|---|---|---|---|
| Saint Paul Institute of Philosophy & Theology | Near East School of Theology (NEST) | 1932 | Yes |

== See also ==
- List of colleges and universities by country
- List of colleges and universities
