= List of university and college mottos =

Many colleges and universities have designated mottos that represent the ethos and culture of that institution.

== Argentina ==
University	Motto	Language	Translation
University of Buenos Aires	Argentum virtus robur et studium	Latin	Argentine virtue is strength and study
National University of Rosario	Confingere hominem cogitantem	Latin	Educating thoughtful people
Buenos Aires Institute of Technology	Ad Lucem Serenitate Tendo	Latin	To the light peacefully she goes
National University of Córdoba	Ut portet nomen meum coram gentibus	Latin	Carry my name to the people
National University of the South	Ardua Veritatem	Latin	Through the difficulties to the truth
National University of Tucuman	Pedes in Terra ad Sidera Visus	Latin	Feet on the ground eyes towards the stars

== Australia ==
University	Motto	Language	Translation
Australian Catholic University	Truth in Love	English	
Australian National University	Naturam Primum Cognoscere Rerum	Latin	First, to learn the nature of things. (From Lucretius, De Rerum Natura, l. VI.)
Bond University	Bringing ambition to life	English	
Central Queensland University	Doctrina Perpetua	Latin	Forever learning
Charles Sturt University	For the public good	English	
Curtin University of Technology	Look Ever Forward	English	
Deakin University		English	
Edith Cowan University	Freedom Through Knowledge	English	
Federation University Australia	Learn to Succeed	English	
Flinders University	Inspiring Achievement	English	
Griffith University	Know More. Do More.	English	
James Cook University	Crescente Luce	Italian	Light ever increasing
La Trobe University	Qui cherche trouve	French	Whoever seeks, finds. (Matthew 7:7)
Macquarie University	And Gladly Teche	Middle English	And gladly teach (from The Canterbury Tales)
Monash University	Ancora imparo	Italian	I am still learning - Michelangelo.
Queensland University of Technology	A university for the real world	English	
Royal Melbourne Institute of Technology	Perita manus mens exculta	Latin	[A] skilled hand [and] cultivated mind
Swinburne University of Technology	Factum per Litteras	Latin	Achievement through learning
University of Adelaide	Sub Cruce Lumen	Latin	The light [of learning] under the [Southern] Cross
University of Canberra	New Intelligence	English	
The University of Melbourne	Postera Crescam Laude	Latin	We grow in the esteem of future generations. ("I will grow in praise afterwards.") - Horace, Odes, l. III. 30.
University of New England	Ex sapientia modus	Latin	Out of wisdom comes moderation
University of New South Wales	Scientia Corde, Manu et Mente	Latin	Knowledge by heart, hand and mind
University of Newcastle	I Look Ahead	English	
The University of Notre Dame Australia	In principio erat Verbum	Latin	In the beginning was the Word. (John 1:1)
University of Queensland	Scientia ac Labore	Latin	Through knowledge and hard work
University of Southern Queensland	Per Studia Mens Nova	Latin	Through study the mind is made new
University of Sydney	Sidere mens eadem mutato	Latin	The constellations change, [but] the mind [remains] the same
University of Tasmania	Ingeniis Patuit Campus	Latin	The field is open to talent
University of Technology, Sydney	Think. Change. Do.	English	
University of Western Australia	Seek Wisdom	English	
Western Sydney University	Unlimited	English	

== Austria ==
University	Motto	Language	Translation
University of Vienna	Unermüdlich neugierig. Seit 1365.	German	Tirelessly curious. Since 1365
Theresian Military Academy	A.E.I.O.U.	German/Latin	
Technical University of Vienna	Technik für Menschen	German	Technology for the people
Vienna University of Economics and Business	Science inspired by consumers	English	
Veterinary Medicine University of Vienna	Lehren mit Verantwortung, Forschen mit Vision und Heilen mit Ambition	German	Teach with responsibility, research with vision, heal with ambition
University of Natural Resources and Life Sciences, Vienna	Universität der Nachhaltigkeit und des Lebens	German	A University of sustainability and of life
University of Klagenfurt	Per aspera ad astra	Latin	Through difficulties to the stars
University of Graz	We work for tomorrow!	English	
Medical University of Graz	Pioneering minds-caring for patients' health and well-being!	English	
University of Leoben	Alles außer gewöhnlich!	German	Everything but usual!

== Bahamas ==
University	Motto	Language	Translation
The College of The Bahamas	Knowledge, Truth, Integrity	English	

== Bangladesh ==
University	Motto	Language	Translation
University of Dhaka	শিক্ষাই আলো	Bengali	Education is light
Bangladesh University of Engineering and Technology	The Ocean of Knowledge	English	
North South University	Center of Excellence in Higher Education	English	
Bangladesh Agricultural University	জ্ঞান, দক্ষতা, চরিত্র	Bengali	Knowledge, Efficiency, Moral Character
Shahjalal University of Science and Technology	অর্জন, চর্চা, সৃষ্টি	Bengali	Inner spirit
Rajshahi University of Engineering and Technology	Heaven's Light is Our Guide	English	
Jagannath University	শিক্ষা, ঈমান, শৃঙ্খলা	Bengali	Education, Faith, Discipline
BRAC University	Inspiring Excellence	English	
Sher-e-Bangla Agricultural University	গবেষণা, শিক্ষা, সম্প্রসারণ	Bengali	Research, Education, Extension
Bangladesh University of Professionals	জ্ঞানের মাধ্যমে উৎকর্ষ সাধন	Bengali	Excellence through knowledge
Bangladesh University of Textiles	জ্ঞানই শক্তি	Bengali	Knowledge Is Power
Military Institute of Science and Technology	প্রগতির জন্য প্রযুক্তি	Bengali	Technology for Advancement

== Belgium ==
University	Motto	Language	Translation
Université Libre de Bruxelles (F); Vrije Universiteit Brussel (NL)	Scientia vincere tenebras	Latin	Conquering darkness by science
Université catholique de Louvain (F); Katholieke Universiteit Leuven (NL)	Sedes sapientiae	Latin	Seat of wisdom
Ghent University	Inter Utrumque	Latin	In Between Both Extremes
University of Hasselt	Knowledge in Action	English	

== Botswana ==
University	Motto	Language	Translation
University of Botswana	Thuto Ke Thebe	Setswana	Education is a Shield

== Brazil ==
University	Motto	Language	Translation
Pontifícia Universidade Católica de Campinas	Fide Splendet et Scientia	Latin	May it shine with truth and knowledge
Pontifícia Universidade Católica de Goiás	Veritas in Scientia et Fide	Latin	Truth in Knowledge and Faith
Pontifícia Universidade Católica do Rio de Janeiro	Alis grave nil	Latin	Nothing is too heavy for those who have wings
Pontifícia Universidade Católica do Rio Grande do Sul	Ad verum ducit	Latin	Leading to the truth
Universidade de Brasília	Autonomia	Portuguese	Autonomy
Universidade de São Paulo	Scientia Vinces	Latin	Through knowledge you win
Universidade Estadual do Ceará	Lumen Ad Viem	Latin	Enlightening life
Universidade Federal de Alagoas	Scientia ad Sapientiam	Latin	Knowledge for Wisdom
Universidade Federal do Espírito Santo	Docete Omnes Gentes	Latin	Teach all the people
Universidade Federal Fluminense	Discere, Docere, Seminare	Latin	Learn, Teach, Spread
Universidade Federal de Minas Gerais	Incipit Vita Nova	Latin	A new life begins
Universidade Federal da Paraíba	Sapientia Ædificat	Latin	Knowledge Builds
Universidade Federal do Paraná	Scientia et Labor	Latin	Science and Work
Universidade Federal de Pernambuco	Virtus Impavida	Latin	Fearless Virtue
Universidade Federal do Rio de Janeiro	A Universidade do Brasil	Portuguese	The University of Brazil
Universidade Federal do Rio Grande do Norte	Accipit ut Det	Latin	Receive to give
Universidade Federal de Uberlândia	Um bem público a serviço do Brasil	Portuguese	A public good in the service of Brazil
Universidade Federal dos Vales do Jequitinhonha e Mucuri	Sapientia et Libertas	Latin	Wisdom and Freedom
Universidade Federal de Viçosa	Ediscere, Scire, Agere, Vincere	Latin	Study, Know, Act, Win
Universidade Presbiteriana Mackenzie	Tradição e Pioneirismo na Educação	Portuguese	Tradition and pioneering in education
Universidade Tecnológica Federal do Paraná	Tecnologia e Humanismo	Portuguese	Technology and humanism

== Canada ==
University	Motto	Language	Translation
Acadia University	In pulvere vinces	Latin	In dust, you conquer
Athabasca University	Learning for Life	English	
Bishop's University	Recti cultus pectora roborant	Latin	Sound learning strengthens the spirit
Brandon University	Aletheuontes de en Agape	Greek	Speaking the truth in love
Brock University	Surgite!	Latin	Push on!
Cape Breton University	Theid Dìchioll Air Thoiseach	Scottish Gaelic	Perseverance will Triumph
Carleton University	Ours the Task Eternal	English	
Concordia University	Small planet, Big thinking	English	
Crandall University	Christus Praeeminens	Latin	Christ is preeminent
Dalhousie University	Ora et Labora	Latin	Prayer and work
École Polytechnique de Montréal	Ut tensio sic vis	Latin	As the extension, the force
Kwantlen Polytechnic University	Through tireless effort knowledge and understanding	English	Through tireless effort knowledge and understanding
Lakehead University	Vos persolvo pro angustus obvius	Latin	Achievement through effort
Laurentian University	Emitte lucem et veritatem	Latin	Send forth thy light and thy truth
McGill University	Grandescunt aucta labore	Latin	By work, all things increase and grow
McMaster University	ΤΑ ΠΑΝΤΑ ΕΝ ΧΡΙΣΤΩΙ ΣΥΝΕΣΤΗΚΕΝ	Greek	All things cohere in Christ
Memorial University of Newfoundland	Provehito in Altum	Latin	Launch forth into the deep
Mount Allison University	Litterae, Religio, Scientia	Latin	Writing, Divinity, Knowledge
Mount Royal University	Quam Bene Non Quantum	Latin	How well, not how much
Mount Saint Vincent University	Veritas ad Deum ducit	Latin	Truth leads to God
Nipissing University	Integritas	Latin	Integrity
Nova Scotia Agricultural College	Mens agitat molem	Latin	mind over matter
OCAD University	Imagination is Everything.	English	
Queen's University at Kingston	Sapientia et Doctrina Stabilitas	Latin	Wisdom and knowledge shall be the stability of thy times
Royal Military College of Canada	Truth, Duty, Valour	English	French: Vérité, Devoir, Vaillance
Royal Roads University	Life.Changing	English	
Saint Francis Xavier University	Quaecumque Sunt Vera	Latin	Whatsoever things are true (Philippians 4:8)
Saint Mary's University	Age Quod Agis	Latin	What you do, do well
St. Mary's University College, Calgary	In Lumine Tuo Videbimus Lumen	Latin	In Thy light shall we see light
Simon Fraser University	Nous sommes prêts	French	We are ready
St. Thomas University	Doce Bonitatem Scientiam et Disciplinam	Latin	Teach me Goodness and Knowledge and Discipline
Thompson Rivers University	T7ETSXEMÍNTE RE STSELXMÉM	Secwepemc	To strive ahead
Toronto Metropolitan University	Mente et Artificio	Latin	With mind and skill
Trent University	Nunc cognosco ex parte	Latin	Now I know in part
Trinity Western University	Turris Fortis Deus Noster	Latin	A Mighty Fortress Is Our God
Université de Montréal	Fide splendet et scientia	Latin	May it shine with truth and knowledge
Université Laval	Deo favente haud pluribus impar	Latin	By the grace of God, to no one equal
University of Alberta	Quaecumque Vera	Latin	Whatsoever things are true
University of British Columbia	Tuum est	Latin	It's up to you or It is yours
University of Calgary	Mo Shùile Togam Suas	Scottish Gaelic	I will lift up my eyes
University of Guelph	Rerum cognoscere causas	Latin	To learn the reasons of realities
University of King's College	Deo Legi Regi Gregi	Latin	For God, Law, King, People
University of Lethbridge	Fiat Lux	Latin	Let there be light
University of Manitoba	Floreat	Latin	"Flourish" or "Prosper"
University of New Brunswick	Sapere Aude	Latin	Dare to know / Dare to be wise
University of Northern British Columbia	En Cha Huná	Dakelh language	literally "He/she too lives", figuratively "Other people have their point of view"
University of Ontario Institute of Technology	Cogitando et Agendo Ducemus	Latin	By thinking and doing, we shall lead
University of Ottawa	Deus Scientiarum Dominus Est	Latin	God is the Master of Sciences
University of Prince Edward Island	Faith, Knowledge, Service	English	
University of Regina	As One Who Serves	English	
University of Saskatchewan	Deo et Patriae	Latin	For God and Country
Université de Sherbrooke	Veritatem in charitate	Latin	Truth in charity
University of Toronto	Velut arbor ævo	Latin	Like a tree through the ages
University of Victoria	ויהי אור / Multitudo sapientium sanitas orbis	Hebrew / Latin	Let there be light A multitude of the wise is the health of the world
University of Waterloo	Concordia cum veritate	Latin	In harmony with truth
University of Western Ontario	Veritas et Utilitas	Latin	Truth and usefulness
University of Windsor	Bonitatem, disciplinam, scientiam	Latin	Goodness, discipline, knowledge
University of Winnipeg	Lux et Veritas Floreant	Latin	Let Light and Truth Flourish
Wilfrid Laurier University	Veritas Omnia Vincit	Latin	Truth conquers all
York University	Tentanda via	Latin	The way must be tried

== Chile ==
University	Motto	Language	Translation
Pontifical Catholic University of Chile	In Christi Lumine pro Mundi Vita	Latin	In Christ's light for the world's life
Pontifical Catholic University of Valparaíso	Fides et Labor	Latin	Faith and work
Federico Santa María Technical University	Ex Umbra in Solem	Latin	From the shadow into the sun
Metropolitan University of Educational Sciences	Veritas Humanitatis Lux	Latin	Truth is the light of mankind
University of Santiago, Chile	Labor Lætitia Nostra	Latin	Work is our joy
Austral University of Chile	Libertas Capitur	Latin	Freedom is conquered

== China ==
University	Motto	Language	Translation
Beijing Foreign Studies University	兼容并蓄 博学笃行	Chinese	
Beijing Normal University	学为人师 行为世范	Chinese	Learn, so as to instruct others; Act, to serve as example to all.
Beijing University of Posts and Telecommunications	厚德 博学 敬业 乐群	Chinese	Great Virtue, Profound Knowledge, Total Commitment, Harmonious Cooperation
Beijing University of Technology	不息为体 日新为道	Chinese	Taking persistence in pursuit as the substance, taking innovation everyday as the way
Chang'an University	弘毅明德 笃学创新	Chinese	
China Pharmaceutical University	精业济群	Chinese	Be proficient and benefit others
Chongqing University	耐劳苦、尚俭朴、勤学业、爱国家	Chinese	Endure Toil, Cherish Thrift, Work Hard and Love the Country
Dalian University	文明 自强 求是 创新	Chinese	Civilization Self-Improvement Truth-Seeking and Originality
Fudan University	博学而笃志，切问而近思	Chinese	Rich in knowledge and tenacious of purposes, inquiring with earnestness and reflecting with self-practice
Harbin Institute of Technology	规格严格 功夫到家	Chinese	
Hebei University	实事求是，笃学诚行	Chinese	
Heilongjiang University	参天尽物 博学慎思	Chinese	
Henan University	明德，新民，至于至善	Chinese	To illustrate illustrious virtue; to renovate the people; and to rest in the highest excellence
Hohai University	艰苦朴素，实事求是，严格要求，勇于探索	Chinese	
Huazhong University of Science and Technology	明德厚学，求是创新	Chinese	Virtue, Knowledge, Truth, Originality
Hunan University	实事求是 敢为人先	Chinese	Seeking Truth from Facts and Daring to be Pioneers
Jiangsu University	博学 求是 明德	Chinese	Be erudite, practical and virtuous
Jilin University	求实创新，励志图强	Chinese	Objective and innovative, determination and persistence.
Jinan University	忠信笃敬	Chinese	Loyalty, Sincerity, Integrity and Respect
Lanzhou University	自强不息 独树一帜	Chinese	Constantly Improving, Blazing Our Own Path
Nanjing University	诚朴雄伟 励学敦行	Chinese	Sincerity with Aspiration, Perseverance and Integrity
Nankai University	允公允能，日新月异	Chinese	Dedication to Public Interests, Acquisition of All-round Capability, Aspiration for Progress with Each Passing Day
Ningbo University	实事求是 经世致用	Chinese	Truth and pragmatism
Northeastern University	自强不息，知行合一	Chinese	
Northwest University	公诚勤朴	Chinese	justice, honesty, diligence, simple
Ocean University of China	海纳百川，取则行远	Chinese	Ocean Embraces Streams All and Exploring Promises Reaching Far
Peking University	(No official motto)		
Qingdao University	博学笃志，明德求真，守正出奇	Chinese	
Renmin University of China	实事求是	Chinese	Seeking truth from facts
Shandong University	学无止境 气有浩然	Chinese	Noble in Spirit; Boundless in Knowledge
Shanghai International Studies University	格高志远，学贯中外	Chinese	Integrity, Vision and Academic Excellence
Shanghai Jiao Tong University	饮水思源 爱国荣校	Chinese	When you drink water, never shall you forget its source; love your motherland and add credit to your Alma Mater
Shanghai University	自强不息；先天下之忧而忧，后天下之乐而乐	Chinese	The movement of heaven is full of power. Thus the superior man makes himself strong and untiring. Be concerned about the affairs of state before others, and enjoy comfort after others.
Shanxi University	尊广道艺、登崇俊良	Chinese	being industrious, strict, honest and creative
Sichuan Normal University	重德，博学，务实，尚美	Chinese	
Sichuan University	海纳百川 有容乃大	Chinese	Sea encompasses hundreds of rivers, willingness to accept all is virtuous Officially: The ocean is exclusive because it embraces hundreds of rivers
Soochow University	养天地正气，法古今完人	Chinese	Unto a full-grown man
Southeast University	止于至善	Chinese	Strive for Perfection
Sun Yat-sen University	博学、审问、慎思、明辨、笃行	Chinese	Study Extensively, Enquire Accurately, Reflect Carefully, Discriminate Clearly, Practise Earnestly
Tianjin University	实事求是	Chinese	Seeking Truth from Facts
Tianjin University of Technology	重德重能、求实求新	Chinese	Focusing on Morals and Capability, Pursuing Truth and Innovation
Tongji University	严谨、求实、团结、创新	Chinese	Discipline, Practicality, Unity and Creativity
Tsinghua University	自强不息、厚德载物	Chinese	Self-Discipline and Social Commitment
University of Science and Technology of China	红专并进，理实交融	Chinese	Being Both Politically Sound and Professionally Competent, and Integrating Theory with Practice
Wuhan University	自强 弘毅 求是 拓新	Chinese	Improve Oneself, Promote Perseverance, Seek Truth and Make Innovations
Xiamen University	自强不息 止于至善	Chinese	Pursue Excellence, Strive for Perfection
Xiangtan University	博学笃行，盛德日新	Chinese	Knowledge, Action and Virtue
Yantai University	守信 求实 好学 力行	Chinese	Be trustworthy, be down-to-earth, be fond of learning, and practice earnestly
Yunnan University	自尊 致知 正义 力行	Chinese	
Zhejiang University	求是创新	Chinese	Seeking the Truth and Pioneering New Trails

== Colombia ==
University	Motto	Language	Translation
Autonomous University of Bucaramanga - UNAB	Liderazgo para el futuro	Spanish	Leadership for the future
National University of Colombia	Inter Aulas Academiæ Quære Verum	Latin	Among the halls of the academy look for the truth
Pontifical Bolivarian University	Formación integral para la transformación social y humana	Spanish	Integral education for social and human transformation
Pontifical Xavierian University	Sapientia aedificavit sibi domum	Latin	Wisdom has built a Home for itself
Pontifical Bolivarian University, Bucaramanga Campus	Excelencia con sentido humano	Spanish	Excellence with human sense
University of Los Andes (Colombia)	Más Allá del Deber	Spanish	Beyond Duty

== Costa Rica ==
University	Motto	Language	Translation
Universidad de Costa Rica	Lucem aspicio	Latin	Towards light

== Denmark ==
University	Motto	Language	Translation
Aalborg University	Viis Novis	Latin	New ways
University of Aarhus	Solidum petit in profundis	Latin	Seek a firm footing in the depths
University of Copenhagen	Coelestem adspicit lucem	Latin	It looks at the celestial light

== Ecuador ==
University	Motto	Language	Translation
Universidad de Especialidades Espíritu Santo (UEES)	Non progredi regredi est	Latin	Not going forward, is going backwards

== El Salvador ==
University	Motto	Language	Translation
University of El Salvador	Hacia la libertad por la cultura	Spanish	Towards freedom though culture
José Matías Delgado University	Omnia Cum Honore	Latin	Everything with Honor
Francisco Gavidia University	Tecnología, Innovación y Calidad	Spanish	Technology, Innovation and Quality
José Simeón Cañas Central American University	Universidad para el Cambio Social	Spanish	University of Social Change
Catholic University of El Salvador	Litterae sine moribus vanae	Latin	Letters without morals are useless
Technological University of El Salvador	Lo que cuenta es tu Actitud Positiva	Spanish	What counts is your Positive Attitude

== Fiji ==
University	Motto	Language	Translation
University of Fiji	Flexible, Innovative, Affordable, Contemporary, Futuristic	English	

== Finland ==
University	Motto	Language	Translation
University of Art and Design Helsinki	Pro Arte Utili	Latin	For useful abilities
Helsinki University of Technology	Labor et scientia	Latin	Work and science
University of Jyväskylä	Amica veritas	Latin	Truth is a friend

== France ==
University	Motto	Language	Translation
Ecole Polytechnique	Pour la Patrie, les Sciences et la Gloire	French	For the Homeland, Science and Glory
Académie de Bordeaux	Crescam et Lucebo	Latin	I shall grow and I shall shine
Mines Paris	Théorie et pratique	French	Theory and practice
University of Nancy	Vive labeur	French	Long live labour
University of Paris	Hic et ubique terrarum	Latin	Here and anywhere on earth
Centrale Paris	Leader, Entrepreneur, Innovateur	French	Leader, Entrepreneur, Innovator
Chavagnes Studium	In electis tuis mitte radices	Latin	Put down roots in your elect
IESEG School of Management	Empowering Changemakers for a Better Society	English	
Université Côte d'Azur	Oser créer	French	Dare to Create

== Germany ==
University	Motto	Language	Translation
RWTH Aachen University	Zukunft denken	German	Thinking the Future
Free University of Berlin	Veritas - Iustitia - Libertas	Latin	Truth - Justice - Freedom
University of Freiburg	Die Wahrheit wird euch frei machen	German	The truth will make you free (John 8 :32)
Jacobs University	Inspiration is a place	English	
Technical University of Darmstadt	Mens agitat molem	Latin	Mind drives matter
University of Greifswald	Wissen lockt. Seit 1456.	German	Knowledge attracts. Since 1456.
Hannover Medical School	Unitas Libertas Caritas	Latin	Unity Liberty Charity
University of Mainz	Ut omnes unum sint Dass alle eins seien	Latin; German	That they all may be one (John 17:21)
Heidelberg University	Semper apertus	Latin	Always open
University of Hamburg	der Forschung, der Lehre, der Bildung	German	for research, for teaching, for education
Kiel University	Pax optima rerum	Latin	Peace is the greatest good
Dresden University of Technology	Wissen schafft Brücken.	German	Knowledge builds bridges.
University of Mannheim	In Omnibus Veritas	Latin	In All the Truth
Technical University of Munich	Zuhause in Bayern, erfolgreich in der Welt. Die unternehmerische Universität.	German	At home in Bavaria, successful in the world. The entrepreneurial University.
University of Potsdam	Klein aber fein	German	Small but excellent
University of Rostock	Traditio et Innovatio	Latin	Tradition and innovation
University of Göttingen	In publica commoda	Latin	For the good of all
University of Trier	Treveris ex urbe Deus complet dona sophiae	Latin	In the city of Trier, God completes the gifts of wisdom
University of Tübingen	Attempto!	Latin	I dare!

== Georgia ==
University	Motto	Language	Translation
Georgian Institute of Public Affairs	In hoc signo vinces	Latin	In this sign you will conquer
Free University of Tbilisi	Scientia, Labor, Libertas	Latin	Knowledge, Labour, Freedom
Grigol Robakidze University	Scientia Et Veritas	Latin	Knowledge and Truth

== Ghana ==
University	Motto	Language	Translation
University of Ghana	Integri Procedamus	Latin	proceed with integrity
University of Cape Coast	Veritas Nobis Lumen	Latin	Truth, Our guide.
Kwame Nkrumah University of Science and Technology	Nyansapɔ wɔsane no badwenma	Twi	The knot of Wisdom is untied only by the wise
University of Education, Winneba	Education for service	English	
Zenith University College	Per Ardua Ad Astra	Latin	Through Adversity to the Stars - in effect, Through Hard Work to the Top
University for Development Studies	Knowledge for Service	English	
University of Mines and Technology	Knowledge, truth and excellence	English	

== Greece ==
University	Motto	Language	Translation
Aristotle University of Thessaloniki	Μούσαις Χάρισι Θῦε	Greek	Sacrifice to the Muses and the Graces
University of Macedonia	Ποιότητα, Αξιοκρατία, Καινοτομία	Greek	Quality, Meritocracy, Innovation

== Hong Kong ==
University	Motto	Language	Translation
The University of Hong Kong	明徳格物; Sapientia et Virtus	Classical Chinese/Latin	Wisdom and virtue/To disseminate virtue and to investigate the way of things
The Chinese University of Hong Kong	博文約禮	Classical Chinese	Through learning and temperance to virtue
The Hong Kong University of Science and Technology	(No official motto)		
City University of Hong Kong	敬業樂群; Officium et Civitas	Classical Chinese/Latin	respect one's professional knowledge, deal with others cheerfully and harmoniously
The Hong Kong Polytechnic University	開物成務 勵學利民	Chinese	To learn (every truth) and to apply, for the benefit of mankind
Hong Kong Baptist University	篤信力行; Light and truth	Classical Chinese	to have faith and proceed with perseverance
Lingnan University	作育英才，服務社會	Chinese	Education for Service
Hong Kong Metropolitan University	公誠毅樸，開明進取; Disce, Progredere, Crea	Classical Chinese/Latin	

== Hungary ==
University	Motto	Language	Translation
Andrássy University Budapest	Europa gestalten	German	Designing Europe
University of Pécs	Magyarország első egyeteme	Hungarian	The first University of Hungary.
University of Szeged	Veritas. Virtus. Libertas.	Latin	Truth. Courage. Freedom.
Eötvös Loránd University	A tudás közössége	Hungarian	The community of knowledge.
Corvinus University	Scientia mea - adiutor meus	Latin	My knowledge is my helper.

== India ==
University	Motto	Language	Translation
GS University	Ubi Scientia Veritatem Illuminat/; ज्ञानं प्रकाशयति तत्परम्	Latin/; Sanskrit	Where Knowledge Lights Truth
Ranchi University	May nostrum scientia fio splendens/; तेजस्वि नावधीतमस्तु	Latin/; Sanskrit	May our knowledge become brilliant
Indian Institute of Technology Madras	सिद्धिर्भवति कर्मजा siddhirbhavati karmaja	Sanskrit	Effort Yields Success
Indian Institute of Technology Kharagpur	योगः कर्मसु कौशलम्	Sanskrit	Excellence in work is (true) yoga
Indian Institute of Technology Kanpur	तमसो मा ज्योतिर्गमय (tamaso mā jyotirgamaya)	Sanskrit	Lead me from darkness to light
Indian Institute of Technology Bombay	ज्ञानं परमं ध्येयम्(jñānaṁ paramaṁ dhyeyam)	Sanskrit	Knowledge is the Supreme Goal
Indian Institute of Technology Roorkee	śramam vinā na kimapi sādhyam / श्रमम् विना न किमपि साध्यम् / shramam vinA na kimapi sAdhyam	Sanskrit	without effort nothing is possible
Indian Institute of Technology (BHU) Varanasi	संस्कार ही शिक्षा (sanskAr hi shikshA)	Hindi	Education is Character
Indian Institute of Management Ahmedabad	vidyā viniyogāt vikāsaḥ / विद्या विनियोगात् विकासः / vidyA viniyogAt vikAsaH	Sanskrit	progress comes from proper application of knowledge
Indian Institute of Management Tiruchirappalli	ज्ञानम् अनंतम्	Sanskrit	Knowledge is Endless
Indian Institute of Management Kozhikode	yogaḥ karmasu kauśalam / योगः कर्मसु कौशलम् / yogaH karmasu kaushalam	Sanskrit	excellence in action is yoga
Indian Institute of Information Technology and Management Gwalior	viśvajīvanāmṛtam jñānam / विश्वजीवनामृतम् ज्ञानम् / vishvajeevanAmRRitam GYaanam	Sanskrit	Knowledge is the elixir of Life
Institute of Engineering and Technology, Lucknow	jñānaṃ bharah kriyam bina / ज्ञानं भारः क्रियां विना / GYaanaM bharah kriyam bina	Sanskrit	Knowledge without action is a burden
Indian Statistical Institute	bhinneṣvaikyasya darśanam / भिन्नेष्वैक्यस्य दर्शनम् / bhinneShvaikyasya darshanam	Sanskrit	even in differences, see the unity
Acharya Nagarjuna University	satye sarvaṃ pratiṣṭhitam / सत्ये सर्वं प्रतिष्ठितम् / satye sarvaM pratiShThitam	Sanskrit	Everything is established in truth
All India Institute of Medical Sciences	śarīramādyaṃ khalu dharmasādhanam / शरीरमाद्यं खलु धर्मसाधनम् / shareeramAdyaM khalu dharmasAdhanam	Sanskrit	Body indeed is the primary instrument of dharma
All India Institute of Medical Sciences, Kalyani	swāsthyam sarvārthasādhanam / स्वास्थ्यं सर्वार्थसाधनम् / Swasthyam sarwarthasadhanam	Sanskrit	All can be achieved with good health
Amrita Vishwa Vidyapeetham	śraddhāvān labhate jñānam / श्रद्धावान् लभते ज्ञानम् / shraddhAvAn labhate GYaanam	Sanskrit	Reverent attains wisdom, (from Rigveda)
Andhra University	tejasvi nāvadhītamastu / तेजस्वि नावधीतमस्तु / tejasvi naavadhiitamastu	Sanskrit	May our knowledge become brilliant
Veer Bahadur Singh Purvanchal University	tejasvi nāvadhītamastu / तेजस्वि नावधीतमस्तु / tejasvi naavadhiitamastu	Sanskrit	May our knowledge become brilliant
Banaras Hindu University	vidyayā amṛtaṃ aśnute / विद्ययाऽमृतमश्नुते / vidyayA amRRitaM ashnute	Sanskrit	be immortal through knowledge
Banasthali Vidyapith	sā vidyā yā vimuktaye / सा विद्या या विमुक्तये / sA vidyA yA vimuktaye	Sanskrit	That is knowledge which liberates
Bengal Engineering and Science University, Shibpur	uttiṣṭha jāgrata prāpya varānnibodhata / उत्तिष्ठ जाग्रत प्राप्य वरान्निबोधत / uttiShTha jAgrata prApya varAnnibodhata	Sanskrit	arise, awake, obtaining worthy (teachers), know (the truth)
Birla Institute of Technology, Mesra, Ranchi	sā vidyā yā vimuktaye / सा विद्या या विमुक्तये / sA vidyA yA vimuktaye	Sanskrit	That is knowledge which liberates
Birla Institute of Technology and Science, Pilani	jñānaṃ paramaṃ balam / ज्ञानं परमं बलम् / GYaanaM paramaM balam	Sanskrit	Knowledge is the ultimate power
Central Board of Secondary Education	asato mā sadgamaya / असतो मा सद्गमय / asato mA sadgamaya	Sanskrit	Lead us From Untruth to Truth
Cochin University of Science and Technology	tejasvi nāvadhītamastu / तेजस्वि नावधीतमस्तु / tejasvi naavadhiitamastu	Sanskrit	May our knowledge become brilliant
College of Engineering, Trivandrum	karma jyayoghya karmanah	Sanskrit	
Devi Ahilya Vishwavidyalaya	dhiyo yo naḥ pracodayāt / धियो यो नः प्रचोदयात् / dhiyo yo naH prachodayaat	Sanskrit	may (the divine power) propel our intellect
University of Mumbai	शीलष्टतफला विद्या	Sanskrit	The Fruit of Learning is Character and Righteous Conduct.
University of Delhi	निष्ठा धृति: सत्यम	Sanskrit	Dedicated to the Truth
University of Pune	य: क्रियावान् स पण्डितः	Sanskrit	He who is industrious is learned
University of Calcutta	Advancement of Learning	English	
Visva Bharati University	Yatra visvam bhavatyekanidam	Sanskrit	Where the world makes a home in a single nest
Gujarat National Law University	ā no bhadrāḥ kratavo yantu viśvataḥ / आ नो भद्राः क्रतवो यन्तु विश्वतः / A no bhadraaH kratavo yantu vishvataH {from -(1.89.1 rigveda)}	Sanskrit	Let good (thoughts) come from everywhere, from all the world
Guru Gobind Singh Indraprastha University	ज्योतिवृ्णीत तमसो विजानऩ /jyotivranit tamso vijajnam	Sanskrit	Cleave the darkness and light through knowledge.
Kurukshetra University	yogastha kuru karmāṇi / योगस्थ कुरु कर्माणि / yogastha kuru karmANi	Sanskrit	do while steadfast in yoga
Madan Mohan Malaviya Engineering College, Gorakhpur	yogaḥ karmasu kauśalam / योगः कर्मसु कौशलम् / yogaH karmasu kaushalam	Sanskrit	excellence in action is yoga
The Maharaja Sayajirao University of Baroda	satyaṃ śivaṃ sundaram / सत्यं शिवं सुन्दरम् / satyaM shivaM sundaram	Sanskrit	truth, auspiciousness, beauty
Motilal Nehru National Institute of Technology	siddhirbhavati karmajā / सिद्धिर्भवति कर्मजा / siddhirbhavati karmajA	Sanskrit	success is born of action
National Institute of Technology, Durgapur	udyogah purushasya lakshanam / उद्योगः पुरुषस्य लक्षणं / udyogah purushasya lakshanam	Sanskrit	industry is man's objective
National Institute of Technology, Hamirpur	Udyamena hi siddhayānti kāryāṇi na manorathaiḥ / उद्यमेन हि सिद्धयान्ति कार्याणि न मनोरथैः	Sanskrit	A goal is achieved through labor, not by desire only
National Institute of Technology, Kurukshetra	śramonavarata ceṣṭā ca / श्रमोनवरत चेष्टा च / shramonavarata cheShTA cha	Sanskrit	tireless effort and attempt
National Institute of Technology, Raipur	नित्यं यातो शुभोदयं / Nityam Yato Shubhodayam	Sanskrit	Let the rise of goodness happen everyday
National Institute of Technology, Agartala	jñānaṃ paramaṃ balam / ज्ञानं परमं बलम् / GYaanaM paramaM balam	Sanskrit	knowledge is the supreme power
Maulana Azad National Institute of Technology	vidha bharen bhooshanam	Sanskrit	
National Institute of Technology Calicut	तमसो मा ज्योतिर्गमय (tamaso mā jyotir gamaya)	Sanskrit	From Darkness, Lead us unto Light
Malaviya National Institute of Technology Jaipur	य़ॊगः कऱमसु कौशलम	Sanskrit	Diligence Leads to Excellence
Dr. B. R. Ambedkar National Institute of Technology	सरस्वती नमस्तुभ्यम्	Sanskrit	I bow to mother saraswati (goddess saraswati).
National Institute of Technology, Jamshedpur	शंन ॠभवः सुकृतः सुहस्ताः	Sanskrit	
National Institute of Technology, Patna	śramonavarata ceṣṭā ca / श्रमोनवरत चेष्टा च	Sanskrit	tireless effort and attempt
National Institute of Technology Raipur	नित्यं यातो शुभोदयं	Sanskrit	Let the rise of goodness happen everyday
National Institute of Technology, Silchar	tejasvi nāvadhītamastu / तेजस्वि नावधीतमस्तु	Sanskrit	May our knowledge become brilliant
National Institute of Technology, Srinagar	الظلمات إلى النور /तमसो मा ज्योर्तिगमय	Sanskrit	Lead me from Darkness to Light
Sardar Vallabhbhai National Institute of Technology, Surat	विज्ञानम सारथि (Vigyanam Saarthi)	Sanskrit	Charioteer(सारथि) of Science(विज्ञानम)
National Institute of Technology Karnataka	Kannada: ಕಾಯಕವೇ ಕೈಲಾಸ Sanskrit: तत्पूजा कर्मचाखिलम	Kannada, Sanskrit	Work is worship
National Institute of Technology, Tiruchirappalli	सत्यमेव जयते	Sanskrit	Truth alone triumphs
National Institute of Technology, Goa	या विद्या सा विमुक्तये	Sanskrit	True Knowledge Liberates
Anna University	Progress through knowledge	English	Progress through knowledge
Loyola College, Chennai	Luceat Lux Vestra	Latin	Let your Light Shine
Scottish Church College, Kolkata	Nec Tamen Consumebatur	Latin	Burning, but yet not consumed
St. Xavier's College, Kolkata	Nihil Ultra	Latin	Nothing Beyond
St. Stephen's College, Delhi	Ad Dei Gloriam	Latin	To the Glory of God
Madras Christian College	In Hoc Signo	Latin	With this as your banner, you shall prevail
Presidency College, Chennai	unde orta recurrent	Latin	whence it arose back
Fergusson University, Pune	Knowledge is Power	English	
Christ University, Bangalore	Excellence and Service	English	Excellence and Service
Netaji Subhas University of Technology	ā no bhadrāḥ kratavo yantu viśvataḥ / आ नो भद्राः क्रतवो यन्तु विश्वतः / A no bhadraaH kratavo yantu vishvataH [from (1.89.1 rigveda)]	Sanskrit	Let good (thoughts) come from everywhere, from all the world
Osmania University	tamaso mā jyotirgamaya / तमसो मा ज्योतिर्गमय / tamaso mA jyotirgamaya	Sanskrit	Lead us from Darkness to Light
National Law School of India University	dharmo rakṣati rakṣitaḥ / धर्मो रक्षति रक्षितः / dharmo rakShati rakShitaH	Sanskrit	values protect the protector (of values)
Sampurnanand Sanskrit University	Sśrutam me gopāya / श्रुतम् मे गोपाय / shrutam me gopaaya	Sanskrit	let my learning be safe, i.e. let it be fruitful, let me not forget my learning
Samrat Ashok Technological Institute	yogaḥ karmasu kauśalam / योगः कर्मसु कौशलम् / yogaH karmasu kaushalam	Sanskrit	excellence in action is yoga
Sri Venkateswara University	Jnānam Samyaga Vekshanam	Sanskrit	Wisdom lies in proper perspective
Tilka Manjhi Bhagalpur University	tamaso mā jyotirgamaya / तमसो मा ज्योतिर्गमय / tamaso mA jyotirgamaya	Sanskrit	Lead us from Darkness to Light
University of Calicut	Nirmaya Karmana Sree	Sanskrit	Prosperity will be produced by pure action
University of Hyderabad	Sa Vidhya Ya Vimukthaye	Sanskrit	Education results in liberation
University of Kerala	Karmani Vyajyate Prajna	Sanskrit	One's intellect is revealed through one's actions
University of Mysore	Nahi Jnanena Sadrusham, Sathyamevoddharamyaham,	Sanskrit	Nothing is Equal to Knowledge, I uphold only the truth
University of Rajasthan	Dharmo Vishwasya Jagatah Pratishtha	Sanskrit	Dharma is the firm foundation upon which the entire universe stands
Uttar Pradesh Technical University	yogaḥ karmasu kauśalam / योगः कर्मसु कौशलम् / yogaH karmasu kaushalam	Sanskrit	excellence in action is yoga
Visvesvaraya National Institute of Technology Nagpur	yogaḥ karmasu kauśalam / योगः कर्मसु कौशलम् / yogaH karmasu kaushalam	Sanskrit	excellence in action is yoga
West Bengal National University of Juridical Sciences	Yuktiheena Vicharetu Dharmahnih Prajayate	Sanskrit	Judgement Devoid Of Logic Destroys Dharma
Visvesvaraya Technological University	Modalu mānavanāgu	Kannada	Above all, be human
University of Allahabad	Quot Rami Tot Arbores	Latin	as many Branches so many Trees
Ma'din Academy, Malappuram	Ma'din Makes Tomorrow	English	
National Institute of Biomedical Genomics, Kalyani	Accelerating Genomics for Health	English	
Vellore Institute of Technology	உழைப்பே உயர்வு தரும் (A Place to Learn, A Chance to Grow)	Tamil	Hard work alone yields success
University of North Bengal	समानो मन्त्रः समितिः समानी (samāno mantraḥ samitiḥ samānī)	Sanskrit	Enlightenment to Perfection

== Indonesia ==
University	Motto	Language	Translation
IPB University	Inspiring Innovation with Integrity	English	
Bandung Institute of Technology	In Harmonia Progressio	Latin	Progress in Harmony
Sepuluh Nopember Institute of Technology	Intelligentia Fides Ingenium	Latin	Intelligent, Trustworthy, Inventive
Gadjah Mada University	Mengakar Kuat, Menjulang Tinggi	Bahasa Indonesia	Locally rooted, globally respected
University of Indonesia	Veritas, Probitas, Iustitia	Latin	Truth, Honesty, Justice
Diponegoro University	Wiyata Hangreksa Gapuraning Nagara	Sanskrit	Safeguarding the Dignity of the Nation
Jenderal Soedirman University	Maju Terus, Pantang Mundur, Tak Kenal Menyerah	Bahasa Indonesia	Always Moving Ahead, No Retreat, Never Give Up
Islam University of Indonesia	Values. Innovation. Perfection.	English	
Padjadjaran University	Bermanfaat dan Mendunia	Bahasa Indonesia	Beneficial and global
Sebelas Maret University	Mangesthi Luhur Ambangun Nagara	Javanese	Aspire Sublimely to Build the Nation
Brawijaya University	Building Up Noble Future	English	
Andalas University	Untuk Kedjajaan Bangsa	Bahasa Indonesia	For the Glory of the Nation
Udayana University	Taki-takining sewaka guna widya	Balinese	People who oblige knowledge shall pursue wisdom and virtue
Syarif Hidayatullah Jakarta State Islamic University	Knowledge Piety Integrity	English	
Indonesia University of Education	Leading and Understanding	English	
Sanata Dharma University	Ad Maiorem Dei Gloriam	Latin	To the greater glory of God
Indonesian Christian University	Melayani, bukan Dilayani	Bahasa Indonesia	To serve, not to be served (Matthew 20:28, Mark 10:45)
HKBP Nommensen University	Pro Deo et Patria	Latin	For God and Country
Muhammadiyah University of Yogyakarta	Unggul dan Islami	Bahasa Indonesia	Eminent and Islamic
Sriwijaya University	Ilmu Alat Pengabdian	Bahasa Indonesia	Science as Dedication Services
Indonesia Open University	Making Higher Education Open to All	English	
Atma Jaya Yogyakarta University	Servien in Lumine Veritatis	Latin	Serving in The Light of Truth
The Republic of Indonesia Defense University	Praditya Wiratama Nagara Bhakti	Sanskrit	Smart warrior to serve the nation
Parahyangan Catholic University	Bakuning Hyang Mrih Guna Santyaya Bhakti	Old Javanese	Based on the belief in God, pursuing knowledge in devotion to the community
Soegijapranata Catholic University	Talenta Pro Patria et Humanitate	Latin	The best talent is dedicated to the nation-state and humanity
University of Rokania	Menata Kehidupan Untuk Masa Depan	Bahasa Indonesia	Arranging Life for the Future
STMIK Citra Mandiri	Buat, Pengembangan, Inovasi Teknologi	Bahasa Indonesia	Create, Develoving, Innovation Technology
Institut Teknologi Del	Martuhan, Marroha, Marbisuk	Bataknese	Godly, Conscientious, Wise

== Ireland ==
University	Motto	Language	Translation
Dublin City University	Ireland's University of Enterprise	English	
Maynooth University	Veritati Fir Fer	Latin	Truth Strength Courage
NUI Galway	Deo favente	Latin	By favouring God
Technological University Dublin	Féidearachtaí as Cuimse	Irish	Infinite Possibilities
Trinity College Dublin	Perpetuis futuris temporibus duraturam	Latin	It will last into endless future times
University College Cork	Where Finbarr taught, let Munster learn	English	
University College Dublin	Ad Astra	Latin	To the stars
University College Dublin	Comhtrom Féinne	Irish	Fair play
University of Limerick	Wisdom for action	English	
Queens University Belfast	Pro tanto Quid Retribuamus	Latin	What will we give back for so much

== Iran ==
University	Motto	Language	Translation
University of Tehran	میاسایید ز آموختن یک زمان	Persian	Rest not a moment from learning
Tehran University of Medical Sciences	مراقبت از نسل جدید	Persian	Caring for a New Generation
Iran University of Science and Technology	هیچ چیز غیرممکن نیست	Persian	Nothing is Impossible
Islamic Azad University	ز گهواره تا گور دانش بجوی	Persian	Seek Knowledge from the Cradle to the Grave
Alzahra University	زنان آگاه جامعه پیشرفته	Persian	Learned Woman, Progressive Society
Kharazmi University	آموختن برای زندگی بهتر	Persian	Learning for A Better Life
Sahand University of Technology	تربیت مهندس بر فراز قلل	Persian	Engineer training on the summits
Tarbiat Modares University	خرد باید و دانش و راستی	Persian	One must have wisdom and knowledge and honesty

== Iraq ==
University	Motto	Language	Translation
Catholic University in Erbil	Learners Today, Leaders Tomorrow	English	

== Israel ==
University	Motto	Language	Translation
Ben-Gurion University of the Negev	השראה פוגשת מצוינות	Hebrew	Inspiration Meets Excellence
Tel Aviv University	בעקבות הלא נודע	Hebrew	Pursuing the Unknown
Open University of Israel	הרבה מעבר לתואר	Hebrew	Far more than a degree
Bar-Ilan University	משפיעים על המחר, היום	Hebrew	Impacting tomorrow, today

== Italy ==
University	Motto	Language	Translation
Pontifical Gregorian University	Religioni et Bonis Artibus	Latin	For Religion and Culture
Sapienza University of Rome	Il futuro è passato qui	Italian	In here the future is already become past / The future has been here / The future has stopped by here
Sant'Anna School of Advanced Studies	Excellentiam ut disciplinam / L'eccellenza come disciplina	Latin/Italian	Excellence as discipline
University of Bologna	Alma mater studiorum	Latin	Nourishing mother of the studies
University of Padua	Universa Universis Patavina Libertas	Latin	Liberty of Padua, universally and for all
University of Pisa	In Supremae Dignitatis	Latin	In the highest dignity
University of Venice (Ca' Foscari)	Venetiarum universitas in domo Foscari	Latin	University of the Venices in Foscari's house
University of Naples (Federico II)	Ad scientiarum haustum et seminarium doctrinarum	Latin	A seminary for those drawn to fields of knowledge and doctrine

== Japan ==
University	Motto	Language	Translation
Keio University	Calamus gladio fortior	Latin	The pen is mightier than the sword
Waseda University	学問の独立 (Gakumon no Dokuritsu)	Japanese	Independence of scholarship
Kwansei Gakuin University	奉仕のための練達 (Hōshi no Tame no Rentatsu)	Japanese	Mastery for Service
Rikkyo University	Pro Deo et Patria	Latin	For God and Country
Sophia University	Lux Veritatis	Latin	The light of truth

== South Korea ==
University	Motto	Language	Translation
Chung-Ang University	의에 죽고 참에 살자 (Euihe jookgo chame salja)	Korean	Live in Truth, Live for Justice
Ewha Womans University	진, 선, 미 (Jin, Seon, Mi)	Korean	Truth, Goodness, Beauty
Gyeongsang National University	개척 (Gaechok)	Korean	Pioneer.
Hankuk University of Foreign Studies	외대로 오면 세계를 만난다 (Wedero omyeon Segyerul man-nanda)	Korean	Come to HUFS, Meet the World
Hanyang University	사랑의 실천 (Sarang-eui shilcheon)	Korean	Love in Truth and in Deed
Hongik University	Pro Hominum Beneficio	Latin	Act of kindness for the human kind
Konkuk University	성, 신, 의 (Seong, Shin, Ui)	Korean	Sincerity, Fidelity, and Righteousness
Korea Advanced Institute of Science and Technology	Education for the world, research for the future	English	
Korea National University of Education	사랑, 신뢰, 인내 (Sarang, Silloe, Innae)	Korean	Love, Confidence, and Patience
Korea University	Libertas, Justitia, Veritas 자유, 정의, 진리 (Jayu, Jungeu, Jinli)	Latin and Korean	Freedom, Justice, Truth
Pohang University of Science and Technology	성실, 창의, 진취 (Sungsil, Changeui, Jinchi)	Korean	Integrity, Creativity, and Aspiration
Seoul National University	Veritas lux mea	Latin	Truth is my light
Sogang University	Obedire Veritati	Latin	Obey the Truth
Sookmyung Women's University	정숙, 현명, 정대 (Jeongsook, Hyunmyung, Jeongdae)	Korean	Modesty, Wisdom, and Justice
Soongsil University	진리와 봉사 (Jinliwa Bongsa)	Korean	Truth and Service.
Sungkyunkwan University	수기치인 (Su Gi Chi In)	Korean	Pursue Truth and Embody Social Justice [the Analects of Confucius]
Yonsei University	Cognoscetis Veritatem et Veritas Liberabit Vos 진리가 너희를 자유롭게 하리라. (Jinli-ga neohui-rul jayuropke-harira)	Latin and Korean	Truth will set you free. [John 8:32]

== Latvia ==
University	Motto	Language	Translation
University of Latvia	Scientiae et patriae	Latin	For science and fatherland
Daugavpils University	Scientia Vinces	Latin	Through knowledge you win

== Lebanon ==
University	Motto	Language	Translation
Al Maaref University	Mastering Life with Wisdom and Knowledge	English	
American University of Beirut	That they may have life and have it more abundantly [John 10:10]	English	
Arab Open University	Towards a Promising Future	English	
Haigazian University	Truth Freedom Service	English	
Holy Spirit University of Kaslik	When the Spirit of Truth Comes, He Will Lead You to the Whole Truth	English	
Lebanese American University	To Strive, to Seek, to Find, and Not to Yield	English	
Lebanese International University	Affordable Quality Education	English	
Lebanese University	Learning, Engaging and Prosperity	English	
Middle East University (Lebanon)	Gateway to Truth and Life	English	
National Conservatory of Arts and Crafts	Docet Omnes Ubique	Latin	He/it teaches everyone everywhere
Notre Dame University – Louaize	Gaudium De Veritate	Latin	Joy from the Truth
Phoenicia University	Leaders Aren't Born, They Are Crafted	English	
Saint Joseph University	Ad Majorem Dei Gloriam	Latin	For the greater glory of God
University of Balamand	والحق تعرفونه	Arabic	And You Know What Is Right

== Lithuania ==
University	Motto	Language	Translation
Kaunas University of Technology	Scientia, ingenium, virtus	Latin	Science, creativity, virtue

== Macau ==
University	Motto	Language	Translation
University of Macau	仁義禮知信	Classical Chinese	Humanity, integrity, propriety, wisdom and sincerity

== Madagascar ==
University	Motto	Language	Translation
University of Antananarivo	Izay adala no toa an-drainy	Malagasy	Foolish is he who seeks only to emulate(match) his father

== Malaysia ==
University	Motto	Language	Translation
International Islamic University Malaysia	Taman Ilmu dan Budi	Malay	Garden of Knowledge and Virtue
Multimedia University	Inquire, Inspire and Innovate	English	
National University of Malaysia	Mengilham harapan, mencipta masa depan	Malay	Inspiring futures, nurturing possibilities
Tun Hussein Onn University of Malaysia	Dengan Hikmah Kita Meneroka	Malay	With Wisdom, We Explore
Sultan Zainal Abidin University	Ilmu Demi Faedah Insan	Malay	Knowledge for the Benefit of Humanity
Universiti Malaya	Ilmu Punca Kemajuan	Malay	Knowledge is the Key to Success
Universiti Malaysia Sarawak	Bersifat Sezaman dan Berpandangan Jauh	Malay	Contemporary and Forward Looking
Universiti Putra Malaysia	Berilmu Berbakti	Malay	With Knowledge We Serve
Universiti Sains Malaysia	Kami Memimpin	Malay	We Lead
Universiti Teknologi Malaysia	Kerana Tuhan Untuk Manusia	Malay	In the Name of God for Mankind
Universiti Teknologi Mara	Usaha, Taqwa, Mulia	Malay	Endeavour, Religious, Dignified
Universiti Utara Malaysia	Ilmu, Budi, Bakti	Malay	Scholarship, Virtue, Service

== Mexico ==
University	Motto	Language	Translation
Universidad de las Américas Puebla	Sapientia, Pax, Fraternitas	Latin	Wisdom, Peace, Brotherhood
Universidad Anahuac - UAX	Vince in bono malum	Latin	Conquer evil with good.
Universidad Autónoma de la Ciudad de México	Nada Humano me es Ajeno	Spanish	Nothing human is alien to me
Benemérita Universidad Autónoma de Puebla	Pensar bien, para vivir mejor	Spanish	To think well, so as to live better
Universidad Tecnologica de Mexico - UNITEC	Ciencia y Técnica con Humanismo	Spanish	Science and technics with humanism
Autonomous University of Campeche	Del Enigma sin Albas a Triángulos de Luz	Spanish	From Mystery Without a Dawn to Triangles of Light
Universidad de Monterrey	Homo Hominis in Ministerio Perficitur	Latin	Man is perfected through the service of man
Autonomous University of Nuevo Leon	Alere Flammam Veritatis	Latin	To feed the flame of truth.
Autonomous University of Baja California	Por la realización plena del hombre	Spanish	For man's fulfillment
Autonomous University of Chihuahua	Luchar para Lograr, Lograr para Dar	Spanish	Fight to Achieve, Achieve to Give
Instituto Tecnológico Autónomo de México - ITAM	Los mejores profesores para los mejores estudiantes	Spanish	The best teachers for the best students.
Instituto Politécnico Nacional - IPN	La técnica al servicio de la patria	Spanish	Technique at the service of the fatherland
Universidad Iberoamericana	La Verdad Nos Hará Libres	Spanish	The truth will set us free. [John 8:32]
Universidad Juarez Autonoma de Tabasco	Estudio en la Duda, Acción en la Fe	Spanish	Study in doubtful things, action in the Faith.
University of Guadalajara	Piensa y Trabaja	Spanish	Think and Work
Sonora Institute of Technology	Educar para trascender	Spanish	Educate to transcend
Universidad de Sonora	El saber de mis hijos hará mi grandeza	Spanish	The knowledge of my children will be my greatness
National Autonomous University of Mexico	Por mi raza hablará el espíritu	Spanish	For my people the Spirit will speak
National Polytechnic Institute	La técnica al servicio de la patria	Spanish	The technique to the service of the fatherland
Universidad Veracruzana	Lis de Veracruz, Arte, Ciencia, Luz	Spanish	Lily of Veracruz, Art, Science, Light
Universidad Autónoma de Yucatán	Luz, Ciencia, y Verdad	Spanish	Light, Science, and Truth
Universidad Autonoma Agraria Antonio Narro	Alma Terra Mater	Latin	Kindly Mother Earth

== Moldova ==
University	Motto	Language	Translation
Ion Creangă Pedagogical State University	Disce ut doceas	Latin	Learn in order to teach
Moldova State University	Vitae discimus	Latin	For life we learn
Nicolae Testemițanu State University of Medicine and Pharmacy	Lucendo allis ego ipse ardeo!	Latin	While I burn, I give light to others!

== The Netherlands ==
University	Motto	Language	Translation
Free University Amsterdam	Auxilium nostrum in nomine Domini (Psalm 123 :8)	Latin	Our help is in the name of the Lord
University of Amsterdam	(no official motto)		
Delft University of Technology	Challenge the Future	English	
Eindhoven University of Technology	Mens Agitat Molem	Latin	The mind moves matter
Erasmus University	Main port of knowledge	English	
Groningen University	Verbum domini lucerna pedibus nostris	Latin	The word of the Lord is a light for our feet
Kampen Theological University	In lumine tuo videmus lumen	Latin	In Your Light we see the light
Leiden University	Praesidium Libertatis	Latin	Bastion of Freedom
Maastricht University	Leading in Learning	English	
Nyenrode Business University	The Spirit of Enterprise	English	
Radboud University Nijmegen	In Dei Nomine Feliciter	Latin	Proceed with happiness in God's name
Tilburg University	Understanding Society	English	
University of Twente	High Tech, Human Touch	English	
Utrecht University	Sol Iustitiae Illustra Nos	Latin	Sun of Justice, Enlighten Us
Wageningen University	For quality of life	English	

== New Zealand ==
University	Motto	Language	Translation
Lincoln University	Scientia et industria cum probitate	Latin	Science and industry with integrity
Massey University	Floreat scientia	Latin	Let knowledge flourish
University of Auckland	Ingenio et Labore	Latin	By natural ability and hard work
University of Canterbury	Ergo tua rura manebunt	Latin	Therefore, your fields will remain (yours)
University of Otago	Sapere aude	Latin	Dare to be wise
University of Waikato	Ko te tangata	Māori	For the people
Victoria University of Wellington	Sapientia magis auro desideranda	Latin	Wisdom is desired more than gold

== Nigeria ==
University	Motto	Language	Translation
Abia State University	Excellence and service	English	
Abubakar Tafawa Balewa University	Doctrina mater artium	Latin	Education is the mother of all practical arts
Achievers University, Owo	Knowledge, integrity, leadership	English	
Adamawa State University	Education for development	English	
Adekunle Ajasin University	For learning and service	English	
Adeleke University	Education, excellence and character	English	
Admiralty University of Nigeria	Excellence in Education	English	
Afe Babalola University	Labor Servitum Et Intergritas	Latin	Labour for service and integrity
African University of Science and Technology	Knowledge is freedom	English	
Ajayi Crowder University	Scentia probitas	Latin	Knowledge with probity
Akwa Ibom State University	Knowledge and technology for development	English	
Alex Ekwueme Federal University, Ndufu-Alike	Home of soaring eagles	English	
Al-Hikmah University	Learning for Wisdom and Morality	English	
Ambrose Alli University	Knowledge for Advancement	English	
American University of Nigeria	Quality, Integrity, Style	English	
Anchor University, Lagos	Character, Competence, Courage	English	
Augustine University	Pro Scientia Et Moribus	Latin	For learning and character
University of Ibadan	Recte Sapere Fons	Latin	To Think Straight Is The Fountain (Of Knowledge)

== Pakistan ==
University	Motto	Language	Translation
Al-Islah Islamic Education System, Sadiqabad, RYK	إن أريد إلا الإصلاح ما استطعت	Arabic	I only seek advancement to the best of my abilities
Army Burn Hall College	Quo non ascendam	Latin	To what heights can I not rise?
COMSATS Institute of Information Technology	We Aim to Inspire	English	
Institute of Business Administration (Karachi)	Leadership and Ideas for Tomorrow	English	
Institute of Management Sciences, Lahore	Where Aims Become Achievement	English	
International Islamic University, Islamabad	وفوق كل ذي علم عليم	Arabic	And above every possessor of knowledge is someone more knowledgeable
University of Agriculture, Faisalabad	Et ex omnibus virtutibus Universitatis brings, inter incapability	Latin	The University brings out all abilities, including incapability
University of Karachi	رَبِّ زدْنيِ علماً	Arabic	O my Lord! Advance me in Knowledge
Quaid-i-Azam University, Islamabad	وَمَن يُؤْتَ الْحِكْمَةَ فَقَدْ أُوتِيَ خَيْرًا كَثِيرًا	Arabic	And whoever has been given wisdom has certainly been given much good

== Paraguay ==
University	Motto	Language	Translation
Catholic University of Asunción	In Principio Erat Verbum - Genuit Nos Verbo Veritatis	Latin	In the Beginning was the Word - He Has Begotten Us by the Word of Truth [John 1:1], [James 1:18]
National University of Asunción	Vitam Impendere Vero	Latin	To stake one's life on what is true. - Juvenal, Satires, IV, 91.

== Peru ==
University	Motto	Language	Translation
Pontifical Catholic University of Perú	Et Lux in Tenebris Lucet	Latin	And the Light Shone in the Dark
Universidad de Lima	Scientia et Praxis	Latin	Science and Practice

== Philippines ==
University	Motto	Language	Translation
Adamson University	My Faith in God Almighty	English	
Adventist University of the Philippines	On Ever Onward	English	
Arellano University	Pro Deo et Patria	Latin	For God and Country
Ateneo de Cagayan - Xavier University	Veritas Liberabit Vos	Latin	The Truth Shall Set You Free
Ateneo de Davao University	Fortes in Fide	Latin	Strong in Faith
Ateneo de Manila University	Lux in Domino	Latin	Light in the Lord
Ateneo de Naga University	Primum Regnum Dei	Latin	First, The Kingdom of God
Ateneo de Zamboanga University	Pro Deo et Patria	Latin	For God and Country
Baliuag University	Patria, Scientia et Virtus	Latin	Country, Science and Virtue
Central Philippine University	Scientia et Fides	Latin	Knowledge and Faith
Centro Escolar University	Ciencia y Virtud	Spanish	Science and Virtue
Colegio de San Juan de Letran	Deus, Patria, Letran	Latin	God, Country, Letran
De La Salle University	Religio, Mores, Cultura	Latin	Religion, Morals, Culture
Far Eastern University	Love of Fatherland and God	English	
Holy Angel University	Laus Deo Semper	Latin	Praise God Always
La Fortuna College	Veritas et honor, vis in perita	Latin	Truth and honor, strength in skill
Laguna State Polytechnic University	Integrity, Professionalism and Innovation	English	
Loyola College of Culion	Fortes in Fide	Latin	Strong in Faith
Lyceum of the Philippines University	Veritas et Fortitudo, Pro Deo et Patria	Latin	Truth and Courage, For God and Country
Malayan Colleges Laguna	Excellence and Virtue	English	
Manuel S. Enverga University Foundation	Pro Deo et Patria	Latin	For God and Country
Mindanao State University	One MSU aspires to achieve one goal for Academic Excellence	English	
Mindanao State University at Naawan	Forging Minds, Better Tomorrow	English	
Mindanao State University–General Santos	Learn, Achieve, Excel	English	
Mindanao State University–Iligan Institute of Technology	Influencing the Future	English	
Mindanao State University–Zamboanga Sibugay	Empowering Minds, Enriching Communities	English	
Misamis University	Educating for the Future	English	
Mountain View College	Shine On Til Jesus Comes	English	
New Era University	Godliness is the Foundation of Knowledge	English	
Our Lady of Fatima University	Veritas et Misericordia	Latin	For Truth and Compassion
Pamantasan ng Cabuyao	Kapayapaan, Kaunlaran, Paglilingkod	Filipino	Peace, Prosperity, Service
Pamantasan ng Lungsod ng Maynila	Karunungan, Kaunlaran, Kadakilaan	Filipino	Wisdom, Prosperity, Greatness
Philippine Normal University	Truth, Excellence, Service	English	
Polytechnic University of the Philippines	Tanglaw ng Bayan	Filipino	Light of the Nation
San Beda University	Fides, Scientia, Virtus	Latin	Faith, Knowledge, Virtue
Saint Louis University	Sapientia Aedificat	Latin	Wisdom Builds
Saint Mary's University	Sapientia A Deo	Latin	Wisdom from God
Saint Paul University System	Caritas, Veritas, Scientia	Latin	Love, Truth and Knowledge
Saint Scholastica's College Westgrove	Ut in Omnibus, Glorificetur Deus!	Latin	That in all Things, God may be glorified!
Silliman University	Via, Veritas, Vita	Latin	The Way, The Truth, The Life
Trinity University of Asia	Pro Deo et Patria	Latin	For God and Country
Universidad de Zamboanga	La Educacion es Libertad	Spanish	Education is Freedom
University of Asia and the Pacific	Unitas	Latin	Unity
University of Northwestern Mindanao	Molder of Hearts and Minds	English	
University of the Assumption	Scientia, Virtus, et Communitas	Latin	Knowledge, Virtue, Community Service
University of the East	Tomorrow begins in the East	English	
University of the East Ramon Magsaysay Memorial Medical Center	Pro Deo Et Patria	Latin	For God and Country
University of Perpetual Help System	Character Building is Nation Building	English	
University of the Philippines (System)	Honor and Excellence in the Service of the Nation	English	
University of San Agustin	Virtus et Scientia	Latin	Virtue and Science
University of San Carlos	Scientia, Virtus, Devotio	Latin	Knowledge, Virtues and Devotion
University of San Jose – Recoletos	Caritas et Scientia	Latin	Love and Knowledge
University of Santo Tomas	Veritas in Caritate	Latin	Truth in Charity
West Visayas State University	Service, Harmony, Excellence	English	

== Poland ==
University	Motto	Language	Translation
University of Łódź	Veritas et Libertas	Latin	Truth and Liberty
Jagiellonian University	Plus ratio quam vis	Latin	Let reason prevail over force (lit. More reason than force)
AGH University of Science and Technology	Labore creata, labori et scientiae servio	Latin	Created in labour, I serve labour and science
John Paul II Catholic University of Lublin	Deo et Patriae	Latin	To God and the Fatherland
University of Gdańsk	In mari via tua	Latin	Your path is through the sea

== Portugal ==
University	Motto	Language	Translation
University of Lisbon	Ad Lucem	Latin	To the Light
Portuguese Open University	Ad Astra	Latin	To the Stars
New University of Lisbon	Omnis Civitas Contra Se Divisa Non Stabit	Latin	All the city divided against itself will not remain
Lusíada University	Sol Lucet Omnibus	Latin	The sun shines over everyone
University of Évora	Honesto Estudo com Longa Experiência Misturado	Portuguese	Honest Study mixed with Long Experience
Catholic University of Portugal	Veritati	Latin	Truth
University of Aveiro	Theoria, Poiesis, Praxis	Greek	Theory, Reflection, Action
Lusophone University of Humanities and Technologies	Humani nihil alienum	Latin	Nothing human is strange to me
University of Porto	Virtus Unita Fortius Agit	Latin	The united virtue is the strongest
University of Beira Interior	Scientia et Labore Altiora Petimus	Latin	Science and Work aim higher things
University of Trás-os-Montes and Upper Douro	Scientia et labore omnia adipiscere	Latin	Science and Work to obtain all

== Romania ==
University	Motto	Language	Translation
Alexandru Ioan Cuza University	Per libertatem ad veritatem	Latin	Through freedom to truth
Babeș-Bolyai University	Traditio nostra unacum Europae virtutibus splendet	Latin	Our tradition glows together with the virtues of Europe
Gheorghe Asachi Technical University of Iași	Ipsa scientia potestas est	Latin	Knowledge itself is power
Polytechnic University of Timișoara	Nu zidurile fac o școală, ci spiritul care domnește într’însa	Romanian	It's not the walls that make a school, but the spirit living inside
Technical University of Cluj-Napoca	Paradoxul ingineriei: pune teoria în practică	Romanian	The paradox of engineering: It puts the theory into practice
University of Bucharest	Virtute et sapientia	Latin	By virtue and wisdom

== Russia ==
University	Motto	Language	Translation
Bauman Moscow State Technical University	Мужество, воля, труд и упорство Russian pronunciation: [ˈmuʐɨstvə | ˈvolʲə | ˈtrut i ʊˈporstvə]	Russian	Courage, will, labor, and perseverance! (American); Courage, will, labour, and perseverance! (British)
European University at Saint Petersburg	Addo Optimus Una	Latin	Bringing the best together
Irkutsk National Research Technical University	Знания — для себя, достижения — для Отечества	Russian	Knowledge is for oneself, achievements are for the Fatherland
Lomonosov Moscow State University	Наука есть ясное познание истины, просвещение разума	Russian	Science is the clear learning of truth and enlightenment of the mind
Moscow Institute of Physics and Technology	Sapere aude	Latin	Dare to know; Dare to be wise
Moscow Engineering Physics Institute	Viam supervadet vadens	Latin	The road will be mastered by the going
Moscow University for the Humanities	Вера, Надежда, Любовь	Russian	Faith, Hope, Charity
Novosibirsk State University	Мы не сделаем вас умнее, мы научим вас думать!	Russian	We will not make you more intelligent, [but] we will teach you how to think [more effectively]!
Peoples' Friendship University of Russia	Scientia unescamus	Latin	We unite with knowledge
Russian State University for the Humanities	Centuriae antiquae traditiones - technologiae modernae	Latin	Centuries-old tradition, contemporary technology
St. Petersburg State University	Hic tuta perennat	Latin	Here we stay in peace
State University – Higher School of Economics	Non scolae sed vitae discimus	Latin	We do not learn for the school, but for life
Orenburg State Institute of Management (OSIM)	Наши студенты — наша реклама	Russian	Our students do us proud
Tver State University	ТвГУ — Твой гарант успеха	Russian	TvGU is your guarantor of success
Ulyanovsk State University	Классический выбор	Russian	Classical choice

== Rwanda ==
University	Motto	Language	Translation
National University of Rwanda	Illuminatio et Salus Populi	Latin	Light and Salvation of the People

== Sri Lanka ==
University	Motto	Language	Translation
University of Sri Jayewardenepura	Vijja Uppaththang Settah	Sanskrit	Science is the Greatest of that which is born
University of Peradeniya	Sarvasva Locanam Sasthram	Sanskrit	Supreme

== South Africa ==
University	Motto	Language	Translation
North-West University, Potchefstroom	In U Lig	Afrikaans	In Thy Light
Rhodes University	Vis, virtus, veritas	Latin	Strength, courage, truth
Stellenbosch University	Pectora roborant cultus recti	Latin	Sound learning strengthens the spirit
University of Cape Town	Spes Bona	Latin	Good Hope
University of Fort Hare	In lumine tuo videbimus lumen	Latin	In Thy light we see light
Durban University of Technology	Learn. Think. Do	English	
University of the Free State	In Veritate Sapientiae Lux	Latin	In Truth is the Light of Wisdom
University of Johannesburg	Diens Deur Kennis	Afrikaans	Service Through Knowledge
University of Pretoria	Ad Destinatum Persequor	Latin	I pursue destiny (lit. "I pursue toward that which is resolved")
University of South Africa	Pro Gentibus Sapientia	Latin	Learning in Service to Humanity
University of the Western Cape	Respice Prospice	Latin	look to the future, learn from the past
University of the Witwatersrand	Scientia et Labore	Latin	With knowledge and labor
University of Venda	Knowledge is Precious	English	
University of Zululand	Diligentia Cresco	Latin	By Diligence we shall lead

== Sudan ==
University	Motto	Language	Translation
University of Khartoum	الله، الحقيقة، الوطن، الإنسانية	Arabic	God - Truth - Our Country - Humanity

== Spain ==
University	Motto	Language	Translation
Universidad Politécnica de Madrid	Technica impendi nationi	Latin	Technology impulses nations
Universidad del País Vasco	Eman ta zabal zazu	Basque	Give and spread it
Universidade da Coruña	Hac luce	Latin	With (the use of) light
Universidad Autónoma de Madrid	Quid ultra faciam?	Latin	What more should I do?
Universidad Carlos III de Madrid	Homo homini sacra res	Latin	Man must be sacred for man
Complutense University	Libertas Perfundet Omnia Luce	Latin	Freedom pours light around
Universidad de Almería	In lumine sapientia	Latin	In sunlight, wisdom
Universidad de Cádiz	Non plus ultra	Latin	Nothing further beyond
Universidad de Granada	Carolus Romanus Imperator Semper Augustus Hispaniarum Rex Fundator Universitatis Granatensis	Latin	Charles, ever Holy Roman Emperor and King of Spain, founder of Granada University
Universidad de La Laguna	Reg. Sancti Ferdinandi Vniversitatis Canariarvm Stemma	Latin	From the King Saint Ferdinand, Canary Islands University shield
Universidad Nacional de Educación a Distancia	Omnibus Mobilibus Mobilior Sapientia	Latin	Of all the things that move, knowledge moves the fastest
Universidad de Las Palmas de Gran Canaria	Ad Orbem per Technicam	Latin	To the world through technics
Universitat Politècnica de València	Ex Technica Progressio	Latin	Progress through technics (lit. "Progress out of technics")
Universidad de Salamanca	Quod Natura Non Dat, Salmantica non praestat (unofficial)	Latin	What nature does not provide, Salamanca does not add
Universidad de Valladolid	Sapientia Aedificavit Sibi Domum	Latin	Wisdom hath built herself a house
Real Centro Universitario Escorial-Maria Christina	Vox veritatis non tacet	Latin	The voice of truth is not silent
Universidad Internacional Menéndez Pelayo	Sapere Aude	Latin	Dare to think / Dare to know
Universitat de Barcelona	Libertas Perfundet Omnia Luce	Latin	Freedom pours light around
Universitat Jaume I	Sapientia sola libertas est	Latin	Only knowledge is freedom

== Switzerland ==
University	Motto	Language	Translation
University of Lausanne	Le savoir vivant	French	The knowledge alive
University of Fribourg	Scientia et Sapientia	Latin	Knowledge and wisdom
University of Geneva	Post Tenebras Lux	Latin	After darkness, light
ETH Zurich	Welcome Tomorrow	English	

== Sweden ==
University	Motto	Language	Translation
Karolinska Institutet	Att förbättra människors hälsa	Swedish	To improve human health
Chalmers University of Technology	Avancez	French	Advance
Lund University	Ad utrumque (paratus)	Latin	(Prepared) for both
University of Gothenburg	Tradita innovare innovata tradere	Latin	A Tradition of Invention, an Inventor of Tradition
University of Uppsala	Gratiae veritas naturae	Latin	Truth through God's mercy and nature
Royal Institute of Technology	Vetenskap och konst	Swedish	Science and Art
Örebro University	Dulce est sapere	Latin	Knowledge is sweet

== Taiwan ==
University	Motto	Language	Translation
Aletheia University	虔誠、質實、勤勞、服務、科學、健康、前進	Traditional Chinese	Pious, solid, hard-working, serving, scientific, healthy, progressive
Asia University	健康 · 關懷 · 創新 · 卓越	Traditional Chinese	Health, Care, Innovation, Excellence
Central Police University	誠	Traditional Chinese	Honesty
Central Taiwan University of Science and Technology	忠、信、篤、敬	Traditional Chinese	Loyalty, trust, sincerity, and respect
Chang Gung University	勤勞樸實	Traditional Chinese	Diligence, Perseverance, Frugality and Trustworthiness
Chang Gung University of Science and Technology	勤勞樸實	Traditional Chinese	Diligence, Perseverance, Frugality and Trustworthiness
Chaoyang University of Technology	勤學、敦品、力行	Traditional Chinese	Diligence, character and action
Chien Hsin University of Science and Technology	好學有禮	Traditional Chinese	Studious and Polite
Chinese Culture University	質樸堅毅	Traditional Chinese	Temperament, Simplicity, Strength, and Tenacity
China Medical University	仁、慎、勤、廉	Traditional Chinese	Compassion, Prudence, Diligence, Integrity
Chung Hua University	勤樸誠正	Traditional Chinese	Diligence, Simplicity, Truthfulness, Justness
Chung Shan Medical University	誠愛精勤	Traditional Chinese	Honesty, Love, Excellence, Diligence
Chung Yuan Christian University	篤信力行	Traditional Chinese	
Dayeh University	手腦並用、敬業樂群	Traditional Chinese	Using the hands and mind together; dedicated and gregarious
Feng Chia University	忠勤誠篤	Traditional Chinese	Loyalty, diligence, sincerity and perseverance
Fo Guang University	義正道慈	Traditional Chinese	
Fu Jen Catholic University	Veritas, Bonitas, Pulchritudo, Sanctitas 真善美聖	Latin, Traditional Chinese	Truth, beauty, goodness and sanctity
Hsuan Chuang University	德智勤毅	Traditional Chinese	Virtue, Knowledge, Diligence and Perseverance
Huafan University	德智能仁	Traditional Chinese	Virtue, knowledge, ability and compassion
I-Shou University	務實創新	Traditional Chinese	Pragmatic and Innovative
Kainan University	至誠、卓越、自由、豪邁	Traditional Chinese	Sincere, excellent, free, bold
Kaohsiung Medical University	樂學至上，研究第一 堅忍自強，勵學濟世	Traditional Chinese	
Ming Chuan University	誠樸敬毅	Traditional Chinese	Honesty, Modesty, Respect, Fortitude
MingDao University	明善誠身	Traditional Chinese	Wisdom, Virtue, Honesty, Progress
Nanhua University	慧道中流	Traditional Chinese	Wisdom, Means, Middle Way
National Changhua University of Education	新本精行	Traditional Chinese	
National Central University	誠樸	Traditional Chinese	Sincerity and Simplicity
National Cheng Kung University	窮理致知	Traditional Chinese	Intellectual Development through Persistent Pursuit of Knowledge
National Chengchi University	親愛精誠	Traditional Chinese	Harmony, Independence, Balance and Preeminence
National Chi Nan University	誠樸弘毅、務本致用	Traditional Chinese	
National Chiayi University	誠樸、力行、創新、服務	Traditional Chinese	Sincerity, Action, Innovation, and Service
National Chung Cheng University	積極創新，修德澤人	Traditional Chinese	To innovate with earnestness; be virtuous with altruism
National Chung Hsing University	誠樸精勤	Traditional Chinese	Honesty, Simplicity, Advancement, Diligence
National Defense Medical Center	精愛精誠 博愛忠真	Traditional Chinese	
National Formosa University	誠正精勤	Traditional Chinese	Integrity, Righteousness, Spirit, Diligence
National Hsinchu University of Education	博雅弘達	Traditional Chinese	
National Ilan University	篤學, 力行, 敬業, 樂群	Traditional Chinese	Studying diligently, practicing with earnestness, developing a respectful attitude toward professionalism
National Kaohsiung First University of Science and Technology	敬業、樂群、卓越、創新	Traditional Chinese	Dedication, camaraderie, excellence, and innovation
National Kaohsiung Marine University	忠、信、勤、勇	Traditional Chinese	Loyalty, trustworthiness, industriousness and bravery
National Kaohsiung Normal University	誠敬宏遠	Traditional Chinese	Sincerity, Reverence, Greatness and Profundity
National Kaohsiung University of Applied Sciences	弘、毅、精、勤	Traditional Chinese	Altruism, Perseverance, Competence, and Diligence
National Kaohsiung University of Hospitality and Tourism	精、誠、勤、樸	Traditional Chinese	Perfect, Honest, Diligent, Modest
National Open University	敦品勵學、敬業樂群	Traditional Chinese	
National Penghu University of Science and Technology	新、實、謙、愛	Traditional Chinese	Innovation, Practicality, Modesty, Love-caring
National Pingtung University of Science and Technology	仁實	Traditional Chinese	Benevolent and True
National Quemoy University	真知、力行、兼善天下	Traditional Chinese	Sincerity, being knowledgeable, fulfillment, and actualization to improve ourselves and to make the world better at the same time
National Taichung University of Education	忠毅勤樸	Traditional Chinese	
National Taichung University of Science and Technology	遠大密微	Traditional Chinese	Broad, dense, micro
National Taipei University	追求真理，服務人群	Traditional Chinese	Searching for the truth and serving the people
National Taipei University of Education	敦愛篤行	Traditional Chinese	To love and to act
National Taipei University of Nursing and Health Science	樂育親仁	Traditional Chinese	
National Taipei University of Technology	誠、樸、精、勤	Traditional Chinese	Integrity, Simplicity, Professionalism, Diligence
National Taiwan Normal University	誠正勤樸	Traditional Chinese	Sincerity, Justice, Diligence, and Simplicity
National Taiwan Ocean University	誠樸博毅	Traditional Chinese	Honesty, Simplicity, Fraternity, Perseverance
National Taiwan Sport University	精誠樸毅	Traditional Chinese	Precision, Honesty, Frugality and Perseverance
National Taiwan University	敦品 勵學 愛國 愛人	Traditional Chinese	Integrity, Diligence, Fidelity, Compassion
National Taiwan University of Arts	真善美	Traditional Chinese	Truth, Goodness, and Beauty
National Taiwan University of Physical Education and Sport	術德兼修、堅強勤奮	Traditional Chinese	
National Taiwan University of Science and Technology	精誠	Traditional Chinese	Precision in Work, Sincerity in Attitude.
National Tsing Hua University	自强不息 厚德載物	Traditional Chinese	Constantly strengthen and cultivate ourselves
National United University	誠、敬、勤、新	Traditional Chinese	Honesty, Respect, Diligence and Creativity
National University of Tainan	仁、智、誠、正	Traditional Chinese	Mercy, Intelligence, Sincerity, Justice
National Yang Ming Chiao Tung University		Traditional Chinese	
National Yunlin University of Science and Technology	誠 敬 恆 新	Traditional Chinese	Sincerity, Honor, Perseverance, Originality
Providence University	進德、修業	Traditional Chinese	Virtue with Knowledge / Virtus cum Scientia
Open University of Kaohsiung	精勤恆實	Traditional Chinese	Expertise, diligence, perseverance, pragmatism
Shih Chien University	力行實踐，修齊治平	Traditional Chinese	Knowledge is the beginning of practice. Doing is the completion of knowing.
Shih Hsin University	德智兼修、手腦並用	Traditional Chinese	Master virtue and wisdom; practice hands and mind
Soochow University	養天地正氣，法古今完人 Unto a Full Grown Man	Traditional Chinese	To nourish the spirit of universal truth, and to emulate the perfect man of the ages
Taipei Medical University	誠樸	Traditional Chinese	Honesty
Tamkang University	樸 實 剛 毅	Traditional Chinese	Simplicity, Truthfulness, Firmness, Perseverance
Toko University	科技、智慧、創造、榮譽	Traditional Chinese	Science and technology, intelligence, creativity, honor
Tunghai University	求真、篤信、力行	Traditional Chinese	Truth, Faith, Deeds—Truth attained through Faith expressed by Deeds
Tzu Chi University	慈悲喜捨	Traditional Chinese	Kindness, Compassion, Joy, and Unselfish Giving
University of Kang Ning	創新 創意 創未來	Traditional Chinese	Innovation, Creativity & Future-building!
University of Taipei	公、誠、勤、樸	Traditional Chinese	
Yuan Ze University	誠、勤、樸、慎	Traditional Chinese	Sincerity, Diligence, Thrift, Prudence

== Thailand ==
University	Motto	Language	Translation
Mahidol University	อตฺตานํ อุปมํ กเร	Pali	One ought to conduct oneself exemplarily
Nakhon Phanom University	มหาวิทยาลัยใกล้บ้าน มาตราฐานสากล	Thai	
Thammasat University	เป็นเลิศ เป็นธรรม ร่วมนำสังคม	Thai	Be the finest, be the fairness, be the main engine of society
Silpakorn University	Ars longa, Vita brevis.	Latin	Art is long, Life is short.
Chiang Mai University	อตฺตานํ ทมยนฺติ ปณฺฑิตา	Pali	The wise control themselves.
King Mongkut's University of Technology Thonburi	ทนโต เสฏโฐ มนุสเสสุ	Pali	The trained man wins.
Srinakharinwirot University	สิกฺขา วิรุฬหิ สมฺปตฺตา	Pali	Education is Growth.
Burapha University	สุโข ปญฺญาปฏิลาโภ	Pali	Gaining intellectual knowledge brings happiness.

== Togo ==
University	Motto	Language	Translation
University of Lomé	Futurae Generis Humani Fides	Latin	Faith in the future of the human race

== Turkey ==
University	Motto	Language	Translation
Hacettepe University	Timeo hominem unius libri	Latin	I fear of a man with a single book
Bilkent University	Veritas	Latin	Truth
Istanbul Bilgi University	Non scholae sed vitae discimus	Latin	We do not learn for the school, but for life
Istanbul Technical University	Asırlardır Çağdaş	Turkish	Pioneer Through the Ages
Middle East Technical University	Scientia Dux Vitae Certissimus	Latin	Science is the truest guide in life
Izmir University of Economics	Geleceği yönetmek	Turkish	Managing the Future
Trakya Üniversitesi	Geleceğe Köprü	Turkish	Bridge to the Future

== Ukraine ==
University	Motto	Language	Translation
Crimea State Medical University	Scientia Potentia Est	Latin	For also knowledge itself is power
Kyiv-Mohyla Academy	Tempus fugit, Academia sempiterna	Latin	Time is running, Academy is eternal
Lviv Polytechnic	Litteris et artibus	Latin	Art & Science
Lviv University	Раtriаe dесоri сіvibus еducаndis	Latin	Educated citizens - glory of the Motherland
National Aviation University	Vivere! Vincere! Creare!	Latin	Live! Create! Overcome!
University of Kyiv	Utilitas honor et gloria	Latin	Utility Honor and Glory
Ukrainian Catholic University	Nosce te ipsum	Latin	Know Thyself

== United Kingdom ==
College or University	Motto	Language	Translation
University of Aberdeen	Initium sapientiæ timor domini	Latin	The beginning of wisdom is fear of the Lord
Abertay University	Beatus homo qui invenit sapientiam	Latin	Blessed is the one who finds wisdom
Aberystwyth University	Nid Byd, Byd Heb Wybodaeth	Welsh	A world without knowledge is no world at all
Alcuin College, York	Panton nos postulo	Latin	All we need
University of the Arts London	A Creative Constellation	English	
Aston University	Forward	English	
Birkbeck, University of London	In nocte consilium	Latin	In night is counsel
Bangor University	Gorau Dawn Deall	Welsh	The best gift is knowledge
University of Bath	Generatim discite cultus	Latin	Learn each field of study according to its kind
University of Birmingham	Per Ardua Ad Alta	Latin	Through efforts to high things
Birmingham City University	Age Quod Agis	Latin	Do what you are doing; attend to your business
Bournemouth University	Discere Mutari Est	Latin	To learn is to change
Bowland College, Lancaster	Bowland 'til I die	English	
School of Oriental and African Studies	Knowledge is power	English	
University of Bradford	Give invention light	English	
University of Bristol	Vim promovet insitam	Latin	(Learning) promotes one's innate power
University of Buckingham	Alis Volans Propriis	Latin	Flying on our own wings
Buckinghamshire New University	Arte et industria	Latin	By art and industry
University of Cambridge	Hinc lucem et pocula sacra	Latin	From here, light and sacred draughts
Canterbury Christ Church University	Veritas liberabit vos (John 8 :31)	Latin	The truth shall make you free
Cardiff University	Gwirionedd Undod A Chytgord	Welsh	Truth, unity and harmony
Cardiff Metropolitan University	The most valuable possession is knowledge	English	
Cartmel College, Lancaster	Live the dream	English	
University of Central Lancashire	Ex solo ad solem	Latin	From the ground to the sun
University of Chester	Qui docet in doctrina	Latin	He that teacheth, on teaching
University of Chichester	Docendo discimus	Latin	By teaching, we learn
Christ's College, Cambridge	Souvent me Souvient	French	I remember often
City University, London	To serve mankind	English	
College of St Hild and St Bede, Durham	Eadem mutata resurgo	Latin	I rise again changed but the same
Collingwood College, Durham	Aime le meilleur	French	Love the best
Corpus Christi College, Cambridge	Floreat Antiqua Domus	Latin	May this old house flourish
Corpus Christi College, Oxford	Est Deo Gratia	Latin	Thanks are to God
County College, Lancaster	Sine Consilio Nihil	Latin	Nothing without counsel
Cranfield University	Post nubes, lux	Latin	Out of darkness, light
De Montfort University	Excellentia et studium	Latin	Excellence and zeal
University of Derby	Experientia Docet	Latin	Experience teaches
Downing College, Cambridge	Quaerere Verum	Latin	Seek the truth
University of Dundee	Magnificat anima mea dominum	Latin	My soul doth magnify the Lord
Durham University	Fundamenta eius super montibus sanctis	Latin	Her foundations are upon the holy hills
University of East Anglia	Do Different	English	
Edge Hill University	In Scientia Opportunitas	Latin	In knowledge there is opportunity
Edinburgh Napier University	Nisi sapientia frustra	Latin	Without knowledge all is in vain
University of Essex	Thought the harder, heart the keener	English	
University of Exeter	Lucem sequimur	Latin	We follow the light
Exeter College, Oxford	Floreat Exon	Latin	May Exeter flourish
Falmouth University	Doing Things Differently / Creative Minds, Inspiring Futures	English	
Fitzwilliam College, Cambridge	Ex antiquis et novissimis optima	Latin	The best out of the old and the new
Furness College, Lancaster	Everywhere else is nowhere	English	
Fylde College, Lancaster	In arvo quaerere verum	Latin	Seek truth in the field
University of Glamorgan	Success Through Endeavour	English	
University of Glasgow	Via, Veritas, Vita	Latin	The way, the truth, and the life
Glasgow Caledonian University	For the Common Weal	Scots	For the common good
University of Gloucestershire	In animo et veritate	Latin	In spirit and truth
Goodricke College, York	Setting the standard	English	
Graduate College, Lancaster	Curiositas nostrum viam illuminat	Latin	Curiosity lights our way
Grey College, Durham	Gradibus ascendimus	Latin	Ascending by degrees
Grizedale College, Lancaster	Never Forget	English	
Halifax College, York	Scholarship, Activity and Community	English	
Harper Adams University	Utile Dulci	Latin	Useful and agreeable
Hatfield College, Durham	Vel Primus Vel Cum Primis	Latin	Either the first or with the first
Heythrop College, University of London	Nil Sine Fide	Latin	Nothing without faith
Homerton College, Cambridge	Respice Finem	Latin	Look to the end
Imperial College London	Scientia imperii decus et tutamen	Latin	Knowledge is the adornment and safeguard of the empire
James College, York	Oderint Dum Metuant	Latin	Let them hate, so long as they fear
Jesus College, Cambridge	Prosperum iter facias	Latin	May your journey be successful
John Snow College, Durham	Per scientiam et prudentiam quaere summam	Latin	To seek the highest through knowledge and wisdom
Josephine Butler College, Durham	Comme je trouve	French	As I find
Keele University	Thanke God for All	English	
University of Kent	Cui servire regnare est	Latin	Whom to serve is to reign
King's College London	Sancte et sapienter	Latin	With holiness and with wisdom
King's College, Cambridge	Veritas et utilitas	Latin	Truth and usefulness
Lady Margaret Hall, Oxford	Souvent me Souviens	French	I remember often
University of Lancaster	Patet omnibus veritas	Latin	Truth lies open to all
Langwith College, York	Vincit qui se vincit	Latin	He conquers who conquers himself
University of Leeds	Et augebitur scientia	Latin	And knowledge will be increased
University of Leicester	Ut vitam habeant	Latin	So that they may have life
Linacre College, Oxford	No End to Learning	English	
University of Lincoln	Libertas per Sapientam	Latin	Through wisdom, liberty
University of Liverpool	Haec otia fovent studia	Latin	These days of peace foster learning
Liverpool Hope University	In faith, hope and love	English	
Liverpool John Moores University	Fortes fortuna adiuvat	Latin	Fortune favours the bold
London School of Economics and Political Science	Rerum cognoscere causas	Latin	To understand the causes of things
Lonsdale College, Lancaster	Simply the best	English	
Loughborough University	Veritate, Scientia, Labore	Latin	By Truth, by science, and by labour
Magdalen College, Oxford	Floreat Magdalena	Latin	May Magdalen flourish
Magdalene College, Cambridge	Garde ta Foy	French	Keep your faith
University of Manchester	Cognitio, sapientia, hvmanitas	Latin	Knowledge, wisdom, humanity
Manchester Metropolitan University	Many arts, many skills	English	
Mansfield College, Oxford	Deus locutus est nobis in filio	Latin	God hath spoken unto us by his son
Merton College, Oxford	Qui Timet Deum Faciet Bona	Latin	He that feareth God will do good
Napier University, Edinburgh	Nisi sapientia frustra	Latin	Without knowledge, all is in vain
New College, Oxford	Manners Makyth Man	English	
Newman University, Birmingham	Ex Umbris in Veritatem	Latin	From the shadow to the truth
Northumbria University	Aetas Discendi	Latin	A lifetime of learning
University of Nottingham	Sapientia urbs conditur	Latin	A city is built on wisdom
Nottingham Trent University	Shaping Futures	English	
The Open University	Learn and Live	English	
University of Oxford	Dominus Illuminatio Mea	Latin	The Lord is my light
Oxford Brookes University	Excellence in Diversity	English	
Pendle College, Lancaster	Altiora sequamor	Latin	Seek to Climb to the Top
Plymouth University	Indagate Fingite Invenite	Latin	Explore, dream, discover
Queen Mary, University of London	Coniunctis viribus	Latin	With united power
Queens' College, Cambridge	Floreat Domus	Latin	May this house flourish
Regent's Park College, Oxford	Omnia probate quod bonum tenete	Latin	Test all things; hold fast to that which is good
The Robert Gordon University, Aberdeen	Omni nunc arte magistra	Latin	Now by all your mastered arts
Royal Holloway, University of London	Esse quam videre	Latin	To be, rather than to seem
Royal Veterinary College	Venienti Occurrite Morbo	Latin	Confront disease at its onset
University of Salford	Altiora Petamus	Latin	Let us seek higher things
Selwyn College, Cambridge	ΑΝΔΡΙΖΕΣΘΕ	Greek	Quit ye like men
University of Sheffield	Rerum cognoscere causas	Latin	To discover the causes of things
Sheffield Hallam University	Learn and Serve	English	
Sidney Sussex College, Cambridge	Dieu me garde de calomnie	French	God preserve me from calumny
South College, Durham	Libertas, aequalitas, civitas totius mundi	Latin	Freedom, equality and global citizenship
University of Southampton	Strenuis Ardua Cedunt	Latin	Adversity yields to endeavour
Southampton Solent University	Scintill Tuus Imaginationem	Latin	Spark your imagination
St Aidan's College, Durham	Super fundaments certis	Latin	Upon sure foundations
University of St Andrews	Αιέν αριστεύειν	Greek	Ever to excel
St Anthony's College, Oxford	Plus est en vous	Latin	There is more in you
St Catherine's College, Oxford	Nova et Vetera	Latin	The old and the new
St Chad's College, Durham	Non vestra sed vos	Latin	Not yours but you
St Cross College, Oxford	Ad Quattuor Cardines Mundi	Latin	To the four corners of the earth
St Cuthbert's Society, Durham	Gratia gratiam parit	Latin	Friendship begets friendship
St John's College, Cambridge	Souvent me Souvient	French	I remember often
St John's College, Durham	Fides nostra victoria	Latin	Our faith is our victory
St Mary's College, Durham	Ancilla Domini	Latin	The handmaid of the Lord
St Peter's College, Oxford	Dum Spiro Spero	Latin	While I breathe, I hope
Stephenson College, Durham	Me quondam mirabitur orbis	Latin	One day I shall astonish the world
Staffordshire University	Create the difference	English	
University of Stirling	Be the Difference	English	
University of Sussex	Be Still and Know	English	
Swansea University	Gweddw crefft heb ei dawn	Welsh	Technical skill is bereft without culture
University of Teesside	Facta Non Verba	Latin	Deeds not words
Trevelyan College, Durham	Vera fictis libentius	Latin	Truth more readily than falsehood
University College, Durham	Non nobis solum	Latin	Not for ourselves alone
University College London	Cuncti adsint meritaeque expectent praemia palmae	Latin	Let all come who by merit most deserve reward
University of Wales College of Medicine	Gwybod Medr Iachau	Welsh	Knowledge enables cures
University of Warwick	Mens agitat molem	Latin	Mind over matter
University of Winchester	Wisdom ond Lar	Old English	Wisdom and knowledge
Van Mildert College, Durham	Sic vos non vobis	Latin	Not for yourselves
Wolfson College, Cambridge	Ring True	English	
Wolfson College, Oxford	Humani nil alienum	Latin	Mankind is not unknown to me
Wrexham Glyndŵr University	Hyder trwy Addysg	Welsh	Confidence through education
Wycliffe Hall, Oxford	Via, Veritas, Vita	Latin	The way, the truth and the life
University of York	In limine sapientiæ	Latin	On the threshold of wisdom
York St John University	Ut Vitam Habeant et Abundantius	Latin	That they have life and have it more abundantly
University of Greenwich	Discere, Agere, Conficere	Latin	To learn, to do, to achieve

== United States ==
University	Motto	Language	Translation
Abraham Lincoln University	Care, Connect, Conquer	English	
Ana G. Méndez University	Studium ral lux	Latin	Light of enlightenment
Appalachian State University	Esse Quam Videri	Latin	To be, rather than to seem
University of Alabama	Coitio cum sorore	Latin	Brotherhood and sisterhood
University of Alaska Fairbanks	Ad Summum	Latin	To the top
Albright College	Veritas et Justita	Latin	Truth and justice
Alfred University	Fiat Lux	Latin	Let there be light
American University	Pro deo et patria	Latin	For God and country
Amherst College	Terras Irradient	Latin	Let them give light to the world
Anderson University (South Carolina)	Humanitatem per crucem alere	Latin	To nourish humanity through the cross
Andrews University	Corpus, Mens, Spiritus	Latin	Body, mind, spirit
Angelo State University	Fiat Lux	Latin	Let there be light
Antioch College	Be ashamed to die until you have won some victory for humanity	English	
University of Arkansas	Veritate Duce Progredi	Latin	To advance with truth as our guide
Aquinas Institute	Credo Quid Quid Dixit Dei Filius	Latin	I believe whatever the son of God has said
Auburn University	For The Advancement of Science and Arts	English	
Azusa Pacific University	God First	English	
Barnard College	επομενη τω λογισμω	Greek	Following the way of reason
Bard College	Dabo tibi coronam vitae	Latin	I shall give thee the crown of life
Barton College	Habebunt Lumen Vitae	Latin	They shall have the light of life
Bates College	Amore Ac Studio	Latin	Love of learning
Bay Path University	Carpe Diem	Latin	Seize The day
Baylor University	Pro Ecclesia, Pro Texana	Latin	For church, for Texas
Belmont Abbey College	That in all things God may be glorified	English	
Benedict College	Veritas et virtus	Latin	Truth and virtue
Berea College	God has made of one blood all peoples of the earth	English	
Berklee College of Music	Esse quam videri	Latin	To be, rather than to seem
Bob Jones University	Petimus Credimus	Latin	We seek, we trust
Boston College	Αιεν αριστευειν	Greek	Ever to excel
Boston University	Learning, Virtue, Piety	English	
Bowdoin College	Ut Aquila Versus Coelum	Latin	As an eagle towards the sky
Brandeis University	אמת	Hebrew	Truth, even unto its innermost parts
University of Bridgeport	Educating for the Real World	English	
Brigham Young University	'Enter to learn; go forth to serve'	English	
Brown University	In deo speramus	Latin	In God we hope
University at Buffalo	Mens sana in corpore sano	Latin	Sound mind in a sound body
University of California all campuses	Fiat lux	Latin	Let there be light
Calvin University	Cor meum tibi offero, Domine, prompte et sincere	Latin	My heart I offer to you, Lord, promptly and sincerely
California Institute of Technology	The truth shall make you free	English	
California State University Maritime Academy	Laborare Pugnare Parati Sumus	Latin	To work or fight, we are ready
California State University all campuses	Vox Veritas Vita	Latin	Voice, Truth, Life
Cal Poly San Luis Obispo, Pomona, and Humboldt	Discere Faciendo	Latin	Learn by Doing
California State University, Chico	Today decides tomorrow	English	
Caldwell College	Sapientia Et Scientia	Latin	Wisdom and knowledge
Campbell University	Ad astra per aspera	Latin	To the stars through difficulties
Campbellsville University	Find Your Calling	English	
Canisius University	Where leaders are made	English	
Cardinal Stritch University	Ut Probetis Potiora	Latin	To value the better things
Carleton College	Declaratio Sermonum Tuorum Illuminat	Latin	The revelation of your words illuminates
Carnegie Mellon University	My heart is in the work	English	
Case Western Reserve University	Lux	Latin	Light
Catawba College	Scholarship, Character, Culture, Service	English	
The Catholic University of America	Deus Lux Mea Est	Latin	God is my light
University of Central Florida	Reach for the Stars	English	
Central Michigan University	Sapientia, Virtus, Amicitia	Latin	Wisdom, virtue, and friendship
College of Charleston	Sapientia ipsa libertas	Latin	Knowledge itself is liberty
University of Chicago	Crescat scientia; vita excolatur	Latin	Let knowledge grow from more to more; and so be human life enriched
Chowan University	Lux et Veritas	Latin	Light and truth
Christian Brothers University	Virtus et Scientia	Latin	Character and knowledge
University of Cincinnati	Juncta Juvant / Alta Petit	Latin	Strength in unity / She seeks the heights
Claremont McKenna College	Crescit cum commercio civitas	Latin	Civilization prospers with commerce
Clark University	Fiat lux	Latin	Let there be light
Clark Atlanta University	I'll Find a Way or Make One	English	
Clarkson University	A Workman That Needeth Not to be Ashamed	English	
Clemson University	Who shall separate us now?	English	
Colby College	Lux Mentis Scientia	Latin	Knowledge is the light of the mind
Colgate University	Deo ac Veritati	Latin	For God and for truth
University of Mount Saint Vincent	Bonitatem et disciplinam et scientiam doce me	Latin	Teach me goodness and discipline and knowledge
College of the Holy Cross	In hoc signo vinces	Latin	In this sign you will conquer
College of Wooster	Scientia et religio, ex uno fonte.	Latin	Knowledge and religion from one source.
University of Colorado	Λαμψατω το φώσ υμών	Greek	Let your light shine
Colorado Christian University	χάρις καὶ ἀλήθεια	Greek	Grace and truth
Colorado College	Scientia et Disciplina	Latin	Knowledge and training
Columbia University	In lumine Tuo videbimus lumen	Latin	In Thy light shall we see light
Cornell University	I would found an institution where any person can find instruction in any study – Ezra Cornell, 1865	English	
Crichton College	Think. Grow. Change.	English	
University of Dallas	Veritatem, Justitiam diligite	Latin	Love ye truth and justice
Dartmouth College	Vox clamantis in deserto	Latin	The voice of one crying in the wilderness
Davidson College	Alenda Lux Ubi Orta Libertas	Latin	Let learning be cherished where liberty has arisen
University of Denver	Pro Scientia et Religione	Latin	For knowledge and religion
DePaul University	Viam sapientiae monstrabo tibi	Latin	I will show you the way of wisdom
Dickinson College	Pietate et doctrina tuta libertas	Latin	Freedom is made safe through character and learning
Dominican University (Illinois)	Caritas et Veritas	Latin	Love and truth
Drew University	δωρεαν ελαβετε δωρεαν δοτε	Greek	Freely you have received, freely give (Matthew 10:8)
Drexel University	Science, Industry, Art	English	
Duke University	Eruditio et Religio	Latin	Erudition and religion
Duquesne University	Spiritus est qui vivificat	Latin	It is the spirit that gives life
East Carolina University	Servire	Latin	To serve
Eastern Kentucky University	Get wisdom, get understanding	English	
Eastern Nazarene College	Via, Veritas, Vita	Latin	The way, the truth, and the life
Elizabethtown College	Educate for Service	English	
Emory University	Cor prudentis possidebit scientiam	Latin	The wise heart will possess knowledge
The Evergreen State College	Omnia Extares	Latin	Let it all hang out [no official translation given, but Latin is incorrectly constructed]
Florida A&M University	Excellence with caring	English	
The Florida State University	Vires, Artes, Mores	Latin	Strength, skill, character
University of Florida	Civium in moribus rei publicae salus	Latin	The welfare of the state depends upon the morals of its citizens
Fontbonne University	Virtus et Scientia	Latin	Virtue and knowledge
Fordham University	Sapientia et Doctrina	Latin	Wisdom and learning
Franklin & Marshall College	Lux et lex	Latin	Light and law
Franklin Pierce Law Center	Inspiring Excellence	English	
Furman University	Christo et Doctrinae	Latin	For Christ and learning
Gallaudet University	Ethpatach	Syriac	Be opened (Mark 7:34)
Gardner-Webb University	Pro Deo et Humanitate	Latin	For God and humanity
George Mason University	Freedom and Learning	English	
George Washington University	Deus Nobis Fiducia	Latin	In God our trust
Georgetown University	Utraque Unum	Latin	Both into one
University of Georgia	Et docere et rerum exquirere causas	Latin	To teach, to serve, and to inquire into the nature of things
Georgia Institute of Technology	Progress and Service (formerly "To Know, To Do, To Be")	English	
University of Great Falls	In lumine tuo, videmus lumen	Latin	In Your light we see the light
Greensboro College	Palma Non Sine Pulvere	Latin	No reward without effort
Greenville Technical College	Clavis Ad Futura	Latin	Keys to the future
Grinnell College	Veritas et Humanitas	Latin	Truth and Humanity
Guilford College	I strive for wisdom and virtue	English	
Hamilton College	Γνῶθι Σεαυτόν	Greek	Know thyself
Hampden–Sydney College	Huc venite iuvenes ut exeatis viri	Latin	Come here as boys so you may leave as men
Hampshire College	Non Satis Scire	Latin	To know is not enough
Harvard University	Veritas	Latin	Truth
University of Hawaiʻi System	Ma luna a'e o na lahui a pau ke ola o ke kanaka	Hawaiian	Above all nations is humanity
Hendrix College	Eις ανδρα τελειον	Greek	Unto the whole person (Ephesians 4:13)
High Point University	Nil Sine Numine	Latin	Nothing without divine guidance
Hillsdale College	Virtus Tentanime Gaudet	Latin	Strength rejoices in the challenge
Hobart College	Disce	Latin	Learn
University of Houston	In tempore	Latin	In time
Howard University	Veritas et Utilitas	Latin	Truth and service
Huntington University	The Truth Will Make You Free	English	
University of Illinois	Learning and Labor	English	
Illinois State University	Gladly we Learn and Teach	English	
Indiana University	Lux et Veritas	Latin	Light and truth
University of Indianapolis	Education for Service	English	
International Academy of Science	Scientia est Potentia	Latin	Knowledge is power
Iona University	Certa Bonum Certamen	Latin	Fight the good fight
Iowa State University	Science with Practice	English	
James Madison University	Knowledge is Liberty	English	
John Jay College of Criminal Justice	Educating of Justice	English	
Johns Hopkins University	Latin: Veritas vos liberabit [John 8:32], (The truth will set you free)	Latin	The truth shall make you free
Johnson & Wales University	The Wildcat Way; Pride, Courage, Character and Community	English	
Johnson C. Smith University	Sit Lux	Latin	Let There Be Light
Johnson State College	Docendo discimus	Latin	By teaching, we learn
Juniata College	Veritas Liberat	Latin	The truth sets free
Kalamazoo College	Lux esto	Latin	Be light
Kansas State University	Rule by Obeying Nature's Laws	English	
University of Kansas	Videbo visionem hanc magnam quare non comburatur rubus	Latin	I will see this great sight, how the bush does not burn
University of Kentucky	Dream, Challenge, Succeed	English	
Lafayette College	Cur Non	Latin	Why Not
Lehigh University	Homo minister et interpres naturae	Latin	Man, the servant and interpreter of nature
Liberty University	Training Champions for Christ	English	
Lindenwood University	Natura et Doctrina	Latin	Character and learning
Lees-McRae College	In Montibus, Ex Montibus, Pro Montibus	Latin	In the mountains, of the mountains, for the mountains
Lenoir-Rhyne University	ἡ ἀλήθεια ἐλευθερώσει ὑμᾶς	Greek	The truth shall set you free
Lesley University	Perissem Ni Perstitissem	Latin	I had perished had I not persisted
Loras College	Pro Deo et Patria	Latin	For God and country
Loyola Marymount University	Ad maiorem Dei gloriam — Tua Luce Dirige	Latin	For the greater glory of God. — Direct us by thy light.
Loyola University Chicago	Ad Maiorem Dei Gloriam	Latin	For the greater glory of God
University of Louisiana at Lafayette	Fortiter, Feliciter, Fideliter	Latin	Boldly, Happily, Faithfully
University of Louisiana at Monroe	Seek the Truth	English	
Louisiana Tech University	Union, Confidence, Justice	English	
Macalester College	Natura et Revelatio Coeli Gemini	Latin	Nature and revelation are twin sisters of heaven
Manhattan University	Signum Fidei	Latin	Sign of faith
Marietta College	Lux Et Veritas	Latin	Light and truth
University of Mary	Lumen Vitae	Latin	The light of life
University of Maryland	(no official motto)		
Marylhurst University	Cor Sapientis Quaerit Doctrinam	Latin	The wise of heart seek knowledge (Proverbs XV)
Massachusetts Institute of Technology	Mens et Manus	Latin	Mind and hand
University of Massachusetts	Ense petit placidam sub libertate quietam	Latin	By the sword we seek peace, but peace only under liberty
Mercyhurst University	Carpe diem	Latin	Seize the day
University of Memphis	Driven by doing	English	
Messiah University	Christ Preeminent	English	
Methodist University	Veritas et Virtus	Latin	Truth and virtue
Miami University	Prodesse Quam Conspici	Latin	To accomplish rather than to be conspicuous
University of Miami	Magna est Veritas	Latin	Great is the truth
University of Michigan	Artes Scientia Veritas	Latin	Art, science, truth
Middlebury College	Scientia et Virtus	Latin	Knowledge and virtue
University of Minnesota	Commune Vinculum Omnibus Artibus	Latin	A common bond for all the arts
Mississippi Christian University	Veritas et Virtus	Latin	Truth and virtue
University of Missouri	Salus Populi	Latin	The welfare of the people
Montana State University Billings	Access and Excellence	English	
Montclair State University	Carpe Diem	Latin	Seize the day
Montreat College	Esse Quam Videri	Latin	To be, rather than to seem
University of Mount Olive	Collegium Christianum Pro Homnibus et Mulieribus	Latin	A Christian college for men and women
Morehead State University	Lux	Latin	Light
Morehouse College	Et Facta est Lux	Latin	And there was light
University of Nebraska at Kearney	Be Blue. Be Gold. BE BOLD.	English	
University of Nebraska–Lincoln	Literis Dedicata et Omnibus Artibus	Latin	Dedicated to letters and all the arts
University of Nevada Las Vegas	Omnia Pro Patria	Latin	Everything, all things for country
University of New Mexico	Lux Hominum Vita	Latin	Light of the life of mankind
The New School	To the Living Spirit	English	
New York University	Perstare et Praestare	Latin	To persevere and to excel
State University of New York	To learn, to search, to serve	English	
Niagara University	Ut Omnes Te Cognoscant	Latin	That all may know you
University of North Carolina at Asheville	Levo Oculos Meos In Montes	Latin	I lift my eyes to the mountains
University of North Carolina at Chapel Hill	Lux Libertas	Latin	Light, liberty
University of North Carolina at Greensboro	Service	English	
University of North Carolina at Wilmington	Discere Aude	Latin	Dare to learn
University of North Dakota	Lux et Lex	Latin	Light and law
North Dakota State University	For the Land and its People	English	
University of Northern Colorado	Sapientia In Aeterum Est	Latin	Wisdom is eternal
Northeastern University	Lux, Veritas, Virtus	Latin	Light, truth, courage
Northwestern University	Quaecumque sunt vera	Latin	Whatsoever things are true
Norwich University	I Will Try	English	
University of Notre Dame	Vita, Dulcedo, Spes	Latin	Our life, our sweetness, our hope
Ohio University	Religio Doctrina Civilitas, Prae Omnibus Virtus	Latin	Religion, learning, civility; Above all, virtue
Ohio State University	Disciplina in civitatem	Latin	Education for citizenship
Ohio Wesleyan University	In lumine tuo videbimus lumen	Latin	In your light we shall see the light
Old Dominion University	A Portal to New Worlds	English	
University of Oregon	Mens Agitat Molem	Latin	Minds move mountains
Peace College	Esse Quam Videri	Latin	To be, rather than to seem
University of Pennsylvania	Leges sine moribus vanae	Latin	Laws without morals are useless
Pennsylvania State University	Making life better	English	
Pitzer College	Provida Futuri	Latin	Mindful of the future
Pepperdine University	Freely you have received, Freely give (Matthew 10:8)	English	
University of Pittsburgh	Veritas et Virtus	Latin	Truth and virtue
Plymouth State University	Ut Prosim	Latin	That I may serve
Polytechnic Institute of New York University	Homo et hominis opera partes naturae	Latin	Both man and the works of man are part of nature
Point Park University	Pro Arte, Pro Communitate, Pro Professione'	Latin	For knowledge, for community, for career
Princeton University	Dei sub numine viget	Latin	Under God's power she flourishes
Portland State University	Doctrina urbi serviat	Latin	Let knowledge serve the city
Principia College	As the sowing, the reaping	English	
Providence College	Veritas	Latin	Truth
Purdue University	"Education, Research, Service"	English	
Queens University of Charlotte	Non ministrari sed ministrare	Latin	Not to be served but to serve
Queens College	Discimus ut serviamus	Latin	We learn in order to serve
Quinnipiac University	Challenging Students to Meet the Challenges of the Future	English	
Rensselaer Polytechnic Institute	Knowledge and Thoroughness	English	
University of Rhode Island	Think big. We do.	English	
Rhodes College	Truth, Loyalty, Service	English	
Rice University	Letters, Science, Art	English	
University of Richmond	Verbum Vitae et Lumen Scientiae	Latin	The word of life and the light of knowledge
Roanoke College	Set for the Defense of the Gospel	English	
University of Rochester	Meliora	Latin	Ever better
Rollins College	Fiat Lux	Latin	Let there be light
Rose-Hulman Institute of Technology	Labor et scientia	Latin	Labor and knowledge
Rutgers University	Sol iustitiae et occidentem illustra	Latin	Sun of righteousness, shine upon the West, also
Salem College	Reach Within, Shape the Future	English	
University of San Francisco	Pro Urbe et Universitate	Latin	For city and university
San Francisco State University	Experientia Docet	Latin	Experience teaches
Scripps College	Incipit vita nova	Latin	Here begins new life
Seton Hall University	Hazard Zet Forward	Anglo-Norman / Old English	Despite hazard, forward
Shimer College	Not to be served, but to serve	English	
Skidmore College	Scuto amoris divini	Latin	Under the shield of divine love
Smith College	Ἐν τῇ ἀρετῇ τὴν γνῶσιν	Greek	In virtue, knowledge
Sonoma State University	Lux Mentis, Lux Orbis	Latin	Light of the mind, light of the world
The University of the South	Ecce quam bonum, et quam iucundum habitare fratres in unum	Latin	Behold, how good and joyful a thing it is, for brethren to dwell together in unity!
University of South Carolina	Emollit Mores Nec Sinit Esse Feros	Latin	Learning humanizes character and does not permit it to be cruel
University of Southern California	Palmam Qui Meruit Ferat	Latin	Let him who deserves it bear away the palm
Southern Illinois University Carbondale	Deo Volente	Latin	God willing
Southern Methodist University	Veritas Liberabit Vos	Latin	The truth will make you free
Southwestern University	Non Quis Sed Quid	Latin	Not who but what
St. Augustine's University (Raleigh)	Veritas vos liberabit	Latin	The truth will set you free
St. Bonaventure University	In Sanctitate et Doctrina	Latin	In holiness and learning
St. John's College (Annapolis/Santa Fe)	Facio liberos ex liberis libris libraque	Latin	I make free adults from children by means of books and a balance
St. John's University (New York City)	Educatio Christiana Animae Perfectio	Latin	A Christian education perfects the soul
St. John Fisher University	Bonitatem et Disciplinam et Scientiam Doce Me	Latin	Teach me goodness, discipline, and knowledge
Stanford University	Die Luft der Freiheit weht	German	The wind of freedom blows
Stetson University	Pro Deo et Veritate.	Latin	For God and truth
Stevens Institute of Technology	Per aspera ad astra	Latin	Through adversity to the stars
Stonehill College	Lux et Spes	Latin	Light and hope
Sweet Briar College	Rosam quae Meruit Ferat	Latin	She who earns the rose may bear it
Syracuse University	Suos Cultores Scientia Coronat	Latin	Knowledge crowns those who seek her
Taylor University	Lux et Fides	Latin	Light and Faith
Temple University	Perseverantia Vincit	Latin	Perseverance Conquers
University of Tennessee	Veritatem cognoscetis et veritas te liberabit	Latin	You will know the truth and the truth shall set you free
University of Texas (all schools)	Disciplina praesidium civitatis	Latin	Education, the guardian of society
Texas Southern University	Excellence in Achievement	English	
Texas Woman's University	Scientia Lumen Vitae	Latin	Knowledge brings light to life
Texas Tech University	From here, it's possible	English	
University of Toledo	Coadyuvando El Presente, Formando El Porvenir	Spanish	Guide to the Present, Moulder of the Future
Touro University	To Serve, To Lead, To Teach	English	
Tufts University	Pax et Lux	Latin	Peace and light
Tulane University	Non Sibi Sed Suis	Latin	Not for one's self, but for one's own
University of Tulsa	Wisdom, Faith, Service	English	
Union College	Sous les lois de Minerve nous devenons tous frères et soeurs	French	Under the laws of Minerva, we all become brothers and sisters
Union University (New York)	In necessariis unitas, in dubiis libertas, in omnibus caritas	Latin	Unity in necessary matters, freedom in doubtful matters, charity for all
Union University	Religio et Eruditio	Latin	Religion and erudition (also: Faith and learning)
United States Coast Guard Academy	Scientiæ Cedit Mare	Latin	The sea yields to knowledge
United States Merchant Marine Academy	Acta non Verba	Latin	Deeds not Words
United States Military Academy	Duty, Honor, Country	English	
United States Naval Academy	Ex Scientia Tridens	Latin	From knowledge, seapower
Valparaiso University	In Tua Luce Videmus Lucem	Latin	In thy light we see light
Vanderbilt University	Crescere Aude	Latin	Dare to grow
University of Vermont	Studiis Et Rebus Honestis	Latin	Through studies and upright affairs
Villanova University	Veritas Unitas Caritas	Latin	Truth unity love
Virginia Military Institute	In Pace Decus, In Bello Praesidium	Latin	In peace, a glorious asset, in war, a tower of strength.
Virginia Polytechnic Institute and State University	Ut prosim	Latin	That I may serve
Wake Forest University	Pro humanitate	Latin	For humanity
Warren Wilson College	We're not for everyone... but then, maybe you're not everyone.	English	
University of Washington	Lux sit	Latin	Let there be light
Washington University in St. Louis	Per veritatem vis	Latin	Strength through truth
Washington and Lee University	Non Incatus Futuri	Latin	Not unmindful of the future
Wellesley College	Non Ministrari sed Ministrare	Latin	Not to be ministered unto, but to minister
West Texas A&M University	Visio Veritas Valor	Latin	Vision, truth, value.
West Virginia University	Πιστει την αρετην εν δε τηι αρετηι την γνωσιν	Greek	Add to your faith virtue and to virtue knowledge
West Virginia University at Parkersburg	Summum Bonum	Latin	The highest good
Western Carolina University	Facultas Vestri Mentis	Latin	The power of your minds
Western Kentucky University	The spirit makes the master	English	
Western University of Health Sciences	Educare, Sanare, Coniunctim	Latin	To teach, to heal, together
William Jewell College	Deo Fisus Labora	Latin	Trust in God, Work
Willamette University	Non nobis solum nati sumus	Latin	Not unto ourselves alone are we born
Williams College	E liberalitate E. Williams, armigeri	Latin	Through the generosity of E. Williams, Esquire
William Smith College	ΒΙΟΣ, ΨΥΧΗ	Greek	Life, soul
Wingate University	Faith, Knowledge, Service	English	
Winthrop University	Veritas cum libertate	Latin	Truth with liberty
Wheaton College (Illinois)	Christo et Regno Ejus	Latin	For Christ and his kingdom
Whitman College	per ardua surgo	Latin	Through adversities I rise
University of Wisconsin–Madison	Numen Lumen	Latin	God, our light (also: The divine within the universe, however manifested, is my light)
University of Wisconsin–River Falls	Where the Free Spirit Prevails	English	
Wofford College	Intaminatis fulget honoribus	Latin	Untarnished, she shines with honor
Worcester Polytechnic Institute	Lehr und Kunst	German	Theory and practice
Xavier University	Vidit mirabilia magna / Ad majorem Dei gloriam	Latin	He has seen great wonders / For the greater glory of God
Yale University	Lux et veritas	Latin	Light and truth

== Venezuela ==
University	Motto	Language	Translation
La Universidad del Zulia	Post Nubila Phoebus	Latin	After the clouds, the sun
Universidad Católica Andrés Bello	Ut innotescat multiformis sapientia Dei	Latin	To make known the manifold wisdom of God
Universidad Central de Venezuela	La Casa que Vence la Sombra	Spanish	The house that defeats the shadow
Universidad de Carabobo	Deus Libertas Cultura	Latin	God, Freedom and Culture
Universidad de Los Andes	Initium Sapientiae timor domini	Latin	The Fear of the Lord is the Beginning of Wisdom
Universidad Simón Bolívar	La Universidad del Futuro	Spanish	The University of the Future

== Vietnam ==
University	Motto	Language	Translation
Faculty of Computer Network and Communication, University of Information Technology	Virtus et Sapientia	Latin	Virtue and Wisdom
Vietnam National University, Hanoi	Ab uno disce omnes	Latin	From one, learn everything.
Van Lang University	Moralitas, Voluntas, Creativitas	Latin	Morality, Will, Creativity.

== Zimbabwe ==
University	Motto	Language	Translation
Lupane State University	Building Communities through Knowledge	English	

== See also ==
- List of military unit mottoes by country
