= MUBS =

MUBS may refer to:

- Monash Union of Berwick Students - Student Union of Monash University, Berwick campus in Melbourne, Australia
- Makerere University Business School - The School of Business of Makerere University in Kampala, Uganda
- Modern University for Business and Science - A university located in Beirut, Lebanon
- Middlesex University Business School - The business school of Middlesex University, in Hendon, north-west London, England
- Mutually Unbiased Bases or MUBs - A concept in quantum information theory
