= LGU =

LGU may refer to:

- Ladies' Golf Union, UK
- Lahore Garrison University, Punjab, Pakistan
- Land-grant university, a type of university in the United States
- Lebanese German University, Jounieh
- Logan-Cache Airport, Utah, US, IATA code
- Former London Guildhall University, UK
- Leningrad State University, Ленинградский государственный университет (Лгу)/Leningradsky gosudarstvenny universitet (LGU)
- Local government unit
- LG U+, a South Korean mobile network operator
