= Modern University for Business and Science =

University in Beirut, Lebanon

Modern University for Business and Science (MUBS)
- Type: Public
- Established: 2000; 26 years ago
- Chancellor: Hatem Alameh
- Location: Beirut, Lebanon
- Campus: Urban
- Website: http://www.mubs.edu.lb/

Modern University for Business and Science (MUBS) is a university in Beirut, Lebanon. MUBS which was founded in 2000, and was previously founded by the Middle East Canadian Academy of Technology (MECAT). MUBS has 5 campuses in Beirut, Damour, Aley, Semkanieh Center, Rashaya, and a community center found in Jal El Dib.

== Faculties ==
The University has three constituent faculties:

- Faculty of Computer & Applied Sciences
- Faculty of Business Administration
- Faculty of Education & Humanities
- Faculty of Health Sciences

== Academic Courses ==
The courses offered at the university include the following:

=== Undergraduate ===
- Bachelor of Science in Optometry and Vision Science
- Bachelor of Science in Computer Science
- Bachelor of Science in Computer & Communication Systems
- Bachelor of Science in Information Security
- Bachelor of Science in Computer Network & Data Communications
- Bachelor of Science in Graphic Design
- Bachelor of Science in Accounting
- Bachelor of Science in Banking & Finance
- Bachelor of Science in Business Administration
- Bachelor of Science in Business Information Systems
- Bachelor of Science in Hospitality Management
- Bachelor of Science in Human Resource Management
- Bachelor of Science in Marketing
- Bachelor of Science in Management
- Bachelor of Science in Economics
- Bachelor of Science in Tourism
- Bachelor of Science in International Business
- Bachelor of Science in Entrepreneurship
- Bachelor of Arts in Early Childhood Education
- Bachelor of Arts in Educational Management
- Bachelor of Arts in Math & Sciences
- Bachelor of Arts in Arabic & Social Studies
- Bachelor of Arts in Social Work

=== Graduate Courses ===
- Master of Business Administration (MBA)
- Doctor of Philosophy (PhD) in Business Administration
- Master of Computer Science (MCS)

== See also ==
- List of universities in Lebanon
