= Al Maaref University =

Lebanese higher education provider

- جامعة المعارف
- Other names: Al-Ma’aref University; MU
- Motto: Mastering Life with Wisdom and Knowledge
- Type: Private
- Established: 22 December 2011; 14 years ago
- Parent institution: Islamic Association of Learning and Education (IALE)
- President: Prof. Ali Alaeddine
- Students: 500+ (intake for Academic Year 2017-2018)
- Location: Beirut, Lebanon
- Campus: Suburban
- Website: www.mu.edu.lb

Al Maaref University (MU) : Arabic: جامعة المعارف, is a private university in Lebanon. It is a subsidiary organization of the Islamic Association of Learning and Education (IALE) that has been operating since 1995.

== History ==
The decree of establishment (N.7265) was given by the Lebanese Ministry of Education and Higher Education (MEHE) on 22 December 2011. Al-Maaref University is accounted to date the 33rd university that is officially recognized by the Lebanese Ministry of Education and Higher Education (MEHE).

The university was inaugurated in October 2015 under the auspices of ministers of the Lebanese government, Hussein Hajj Hassan and the ambassador of the Islamic Republic of Iran Mohammad Fat'hali.

The first published university prospectus was dated July 2015. The university is guided by Article 10 of the Lebanese Constitution, the Educational Reforms as initiated by the National Reconciliation Accord (Taef Agreement), and the international conventions for economic, social and cultural rights.

== Organization ==
The university is headed by a board consisting of known academic backgrounds and ex ministers in the Lebanese government, that has organized Al Maaref into five faculties headed by Deans, led by a University President and guided by a Board of Trustees.

== Academics ==
The faculties are:

- Engineering (FoE),
- Science (FoS),
- Business Administration (BA),
- Mass Communication and Fine Arts (MCFA),
- Religions and Humanities (RH) including Translation and Languages department.

Each of the current five faculties has departments running majors in different disciplines. The total number of majors leading to a recognized Bachelor degree is 18. The university has plans to expand the majors offered to students in the second and third year of its operations.

The Faculty of Engineering offers four majors in the following areas:

- Electrical and Electronics Engineering
- Mechanical Engineering
- Civil Engineering
- Computer Engineering and Technology

The Faculty of Science offers six majors in the following areas:

- Applied Statistics
- Mathematics
- Computer Science
- Physics
- Chemistry
- Biology

The Faculty of Business Administration runs eight majors in the following areas:

- Accounting
- Banking and Finance
- Economics
- Human Resources Management
- Management
- International Business
- Marketing
- Information Technology and Management Systems

The Faculty of Mass Communication and Fine Arts offers four majors in the following areas:

- Media Studies
- Journalism and Digital Media
- Advertising and Public Relations
- Radio and Television

The Faculty of Religions and Human Sciences offers six majors in the following areas:

- Comparative Religions
- Quranic Studies and Prophetic Hadith
- History and Comparative Civilizations
- Islamic Studies
- Philosophy and Theology
- Language and Translations (English, French, Arabic)
