= Middle East University (Lebanon) =

Non-profit institution of higher learning in Beirut, Lebanon

- جامعة الشرق الاوسط
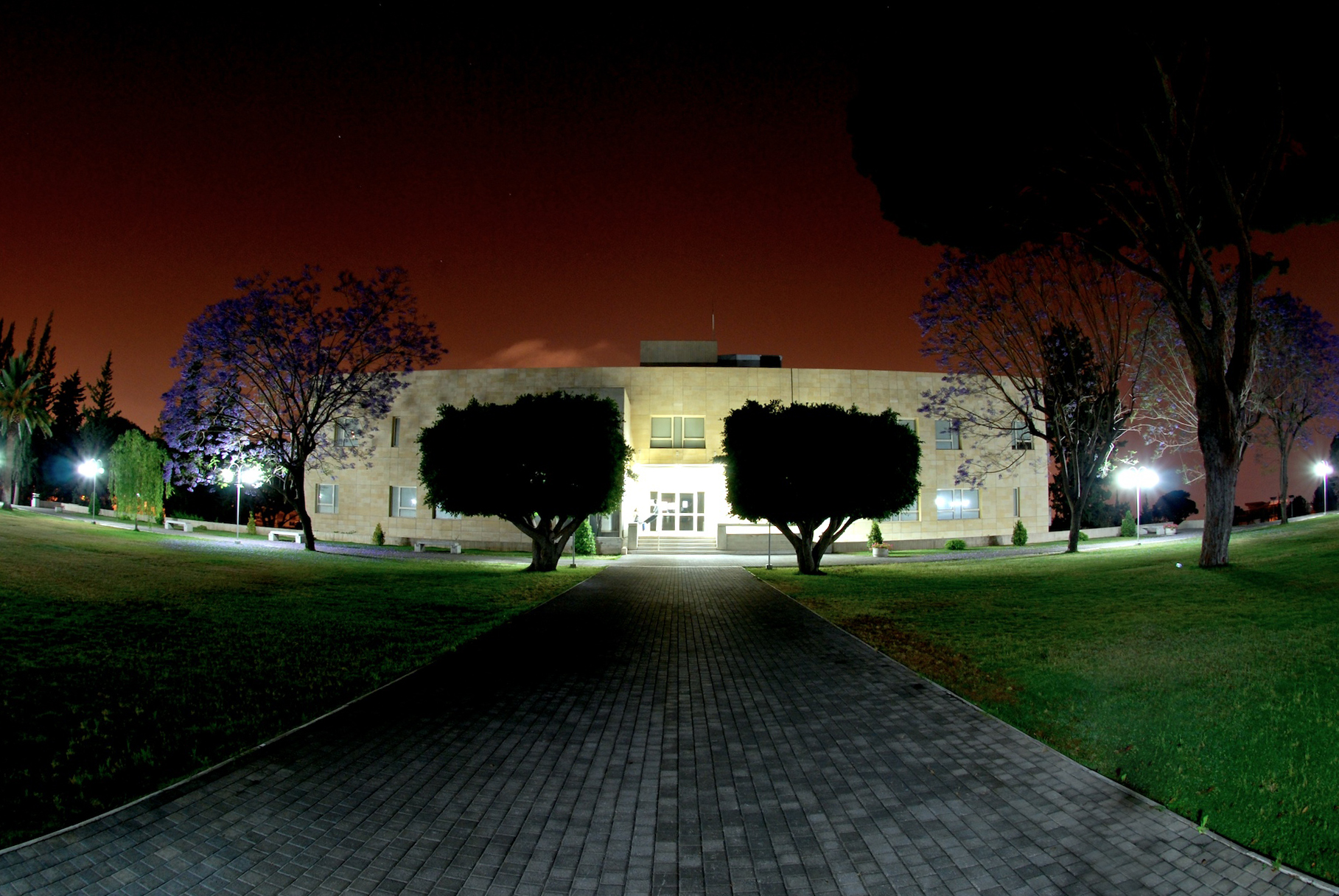
- University Hall
- Former names: Adventist College of Beirut; Middle East College
- Motto: Gateway to truth and life
- Type: Private
- Established: 1939; 87 years ago
- Affiliations: Seventh-day Adventist Church
- President: Dr. Carlos Biaggi
- Location: Beirut, Lebanon; 33.873159°N 35.5669285°E
- Colors: Maroon; Silver
- Website: meu.edu.lb

Middle East University (MEU; Arabic: جامعة الشرق الاوسط) is a private Protestant Christian university in Beirut, Lebanon. The campus is located in the Beirut suburb of Sabtieh, on the outskirts of the city. It is affiliated with and operated by the Seventh-day Adventist Church.

== History ==
Founded as the Adventist College of Beirut and located in Mouseitbeh, in 1946 the institution was relocated to its present location, east of Beirut in Sabtieh, Sad El-Bauchrieh. During the same year it was renamed Middle East College and the cornerstone of what is now North Hall was laid by Sheikh Bechara El Khoury, the then President of the Republic of Lebanon.

On 28 June 2001, Middle East College was formally and legally renamed Middle East University.

== Academic programs ==
The university has four faculties:

1. Faculty of Arts and Sciences
2. Faculty of Business Administration
3. Faculty of Education
4. Faculty of Philosophy and Theology

Middle East University offers programs that lead to both undergraduate and graduate degrees. Classes are taught in English. The Arabic Language Institute and the English Language Institute offer intensive courses to non-native speakers as well.

== See also ==
- List of Seventh-day Adventist colleges and universities
- Seventh-day Adventist education
