= Phoenicia University =

Private higher education provider in Lebanon

PU Phoenicia University جامعة فينيسيا
- Motto: Leaders aren't born, they are crafted
- Type: Non-sectarian, non-profit, private University
- Established: 2012; 14 years ago
- President: Imad Zbib
- Location: Daoudiye, District of Zahrani, Lebanon
- Campus: Suburban, 25 acres (100,000 m^{2})
- Website: www.pu.edu.lb

Phoenicia University (PU; Arabic: جامعة فينيسيا) is a private non-sectarian institution of higher education with its main campus located in Daoudiye, the district of Zahrani, Southern Governorate of Lebanon. It was founded in 2012 under Decree No. 9089 as Phoenicia University International.

== History ==
Phoenicia University was founded in 2012. Construction finished in the summer of 2015, and the first 5 of the university's 6 schools began teaching. In the university's first year, it accepted 450 students from 1,200 applications.

== Colleges ==
The University is licensed to operate six colleges with a total of 17 degree programs. The colleges of Engineering, Business Administration, Law and Political Science, Arts and Sciences, and Public Health began operating in the university's first year. The college of Architecture began teaching in September 2016.
