= Lebanese German University =

University in Lebanon

Lebanese German University LGU
- Established: 2008
- President: Pr. Dr Samir Matar
- Location: Jounieh, Lebanon
- Website: http://www.lgu.edu.lb/

The Lebanese German University, LGU is a higher educational institution in Jounieh, Lebanon.

Founded by the Lebanese German Association for the Promotion of Culture, a non-profit NGO, the Lebanese German University opened its doors in 2008 after obtaining Presidential Decree number 794, dated October 5, 2007.

In the fall semester of the academic year 2008/2009, 200 students were registered at LGU in different majors. In the spring semester, students’ enrolment increased. Today LGU has over 500 students, 25 administrative and logistics employees, 24 full-time professors, and 126 part-time assistant professors. All courses are given in both English and French. German is taught as an elective language course.

== History ==
In 1974 the Lebanese German Organization for the Promotion of Culture founded the Technical Institute of Paramedical Sciences (TIPS). As an institute of higher education, TIPS graduated over 2500 students in the field of healthcare. In 1986, the German School was established for primary up to high school levels.

== Academics ==
LGU implements the European Credit Transfer System (ECTS) in all majors. The diplomas delivered by LGU are the bachelor's degree for all majors and the master's degree in Podotherapy for the Physical Therapy major. The majors offered at LGU relate to specializations in public health, business, fine arts and education.

=== Faculties and Majors ===
LGU has a variety of majors grouped under three faculties:

- Faculty of Public Health
  - Nursing Department
  - Nutrition Department
  - Physical Therapy Department
  - Biomedical Technologies Department
  - Medical Sciences Laboratories Department
  - Medical Imaging Department
- Faculty of Business and Tourism
  - Business Administration with concentrations in Marketing, Management, Human Resources, Information Systems, School Management, Accounting and Auditing, and Finance.
  - Hospital Management
  - Hotel Management
  - Insurance (professional program in collaboration with the prestigious CII – Chartered Insurance Institute of London)
  - Tourism
- Faculty of Arts and Education
  - Department of Primary and Pre-school Education
  - Department of Performing Arts (Film / TV)
  - Department of Musicology
