= Polytechnic University of the Philippines (disambiguation) =

The Polytechnic University of the Philippines is a state university in the Philippines.

== Branches and Campuses ==
Central Luzon

- Polytechnic University of the Philippines, Bataan
- Polytechnic University of the Philippines, Cabiao
- Polytechnic University of the Philippines, Pulilan
- Polytechnic University of the Philippines, Santa Maria

Southern Luzon

- Polytechnic University of the Philippines, Bansud
- Polytechnic University of the Philippines, Biñan
- Polytechnic University of the Philippines, Calauan
- Polytechnic University of the Philippines, General Luna
- Polytechnic University of the Philippines, Lopez
- Polytechnic University of the Philippines, Maragondon
- Polytechnic University of the Philippines, Mulanay
- Polytechnic University of the Philippines, Ragay
- Polytechnic University of the Philippines, Sablayan
- Polytechnic University of the Philippines, San Pedro
- Polytechnic University of the Philippines, Santa Rosa
- Polytechnic University of the Philippines, Santo Tomas
- Polytechnic University of the Philippines, Unisan

Metro Manila

- Polytechnic University of the Philippines (Mabini, M.H. del Pilar, and NDC Campuses)
- Polytechnic University of the Philippines, Parañaque
- Polytechnic University of the Philippines, Quezon City
- Polytechnic University of the Philippines, San Juan
- Polytechnic University of the Philippines, Taguig

== Other unrelated institutions with "University of the Philippines" on their titles ==
- Adventist University of the Philippines, a private coeducational Christian university
- Technological University of the Philippines, the flagship technology education university of the Philippines
- University of the Philippines, the national university of the Philippines (see disambiguation page)
