= History of the Polytechnic University of the Philippines =

What originally started as the Manila Business School that opened in 1904, is now the Polytechnic University of the Philippines, the largest university system in the country by enrollment.

== History ==
=== Manila Business School and the Philippine School of Commerce (1904–1952) ===
This institution started as the Manila Business School (MBS, also referred as the Manila School of Commerce), founded on October 19, 1904 as part of the city school system under the superintendence of Gabriel A. O’Reilly. The school was established to meet the growing need for businessmen and women in government service and private employment. It was renamed as Philippine School of Commerce (PSC) in 1908 and was made an Insular (or National) school. In 1911, the school was again placed under the administration of the city school system, still retaining its status as an Insular (or National) school.

In 1933, PSC merged with the Philippine Normal School (PNS) and the Philippine School of Arts and Trades. The resulting merger placed PSC under the administration of PNS. PSC students who completed their courses were considered graduates of PNS. In 1940, President Manuel L. Quezon, during his graduation address at Rizal Memorial Stadium, promised a new building for the school. Subsequently, in 1942, Congressman Manuel A. Alazarte along with the PSC's Department Head Luis F. Reyes formulated a bill to this effect, and it was presented to Congress. Unfortunately, the plan was not carried out because of the war in the Pacific.

In 1946, efforts to re-establishment and rehabilitate the school were initiated and intensified. The Bureau of Public Works released more than ₱8,000 for the repairs and maintenance of public buildings, of which the school was a beneficiary. PNS's Normal Hall, which was in ruins, was reconstructed. The college resumed its operations there before it was converted to a dormitory a year later. This forced PSC to continue its operations on its former campus before the PNS-PSC-PSAT merger. PSC's campus lot size was inadequate, so the school authority intensified its plans and made a proposal to acquire a new lot. On July 31, 1947, two buildings at Lepanto Street (now S. H. Loyola Street) in Sampaloc, Manila were leased to the government for the exclusive use of PSC. One year later, the school acquired its P.E. Grounds, adjacent to its campus. Operations were continued at this location until 1971.

=== Philippine College of Commerce (1952–1978) ===
By virtue of Republic Act 778, passed by the houses of Congress on May 20, 1952 and signed by President Elpidio Quirino on June 21, 1952, PSC became the Philippine College of Commerce (PCC), with Luis F. Reyes as its first president. The PCC broadened its program offerings with the inclusion of undergraduate courses in commerce and related fields. The school celebrated its Golden Jubilee on 1954. In 1955, PCC acquired its Annex Building and earned the title "Business College of the Year" by the Business Writers Association of the Philippines. When Reyes retired, Professor Pacifico A. Velilla took over the presidency of PCC and in 1960 Attorney Victor dela Torre was designated as PCC's Acting President. In 1962, Dr. Nemesio E. Prudente assumed presidency and oversaw major improvements during his time.

In 1965, the site of the Bureau of Animal Industry in Pandacan, Manila was reserved for the use of PCC through the proclamation of President Diosdado Macapagal. Two years later, President Ferdinand Marcos also reserved a 10 hectare (24 acres (0.1 km^{2})) lot in Bicutan, Taguig for PCC's exclusive use. On 1968, a large area at Santa Mesa, Manila was authorized for the use and disposition of PCC. Also, the title lot for its campus in Sampaloc, Manila was awarded to PCC. On 1971, PCC's Laboratory High School was transferred to the new campus in Santa Mesa, Manila and the school's Katipunan Foundation, Inc. was established.

In 1972, PCC reorganized its academic and administrative policies, followed by the establishment of a satellite campus in the Bataan Export Processing Zone (BEPZ), Mariveles, Bataan on 1975, and another satellite campus in Quezon on 1978. Dr. Isabelo T. Crisostomo became the OIC of the College on 1973. He would be succeeded by Dr. Pablo T. Mateo in 1977.

=== Polytechnic University of the Philippines (1978–present) ===
Through Presidential Decree (PD) 1341, the Philippine College of Commerce (PCC) was converted into a chartered state university and accordingly renamed as the Polytechnic University of the Philippines (PUP) on 1978.

In 1986, Dr. Nemesio E. Prudente once again became the University President. Prudente had the university's philosophy, mission, and strategies formulated by a multi-sectoral committee. He also had a new logo designed, a new university hymn composed, and once again he restructured the academic and administrative organization of the university. The governance of the university was also democratized, with students actively participating in making academic and economic decisions. Under his leadership, the university had improvements made on its facilities and academics, and had more student organizations established. These changes increased enrollment, so that more colleges were added over time.

In 1988, the administration took steps to improve the facilities of all the PUP campuses. The university also established extensions in Taguig, Romblon and Masbate. This was followed by the acquisition of a 10 hectare lot adjacent to the campus in Santa Mesa, Manila.

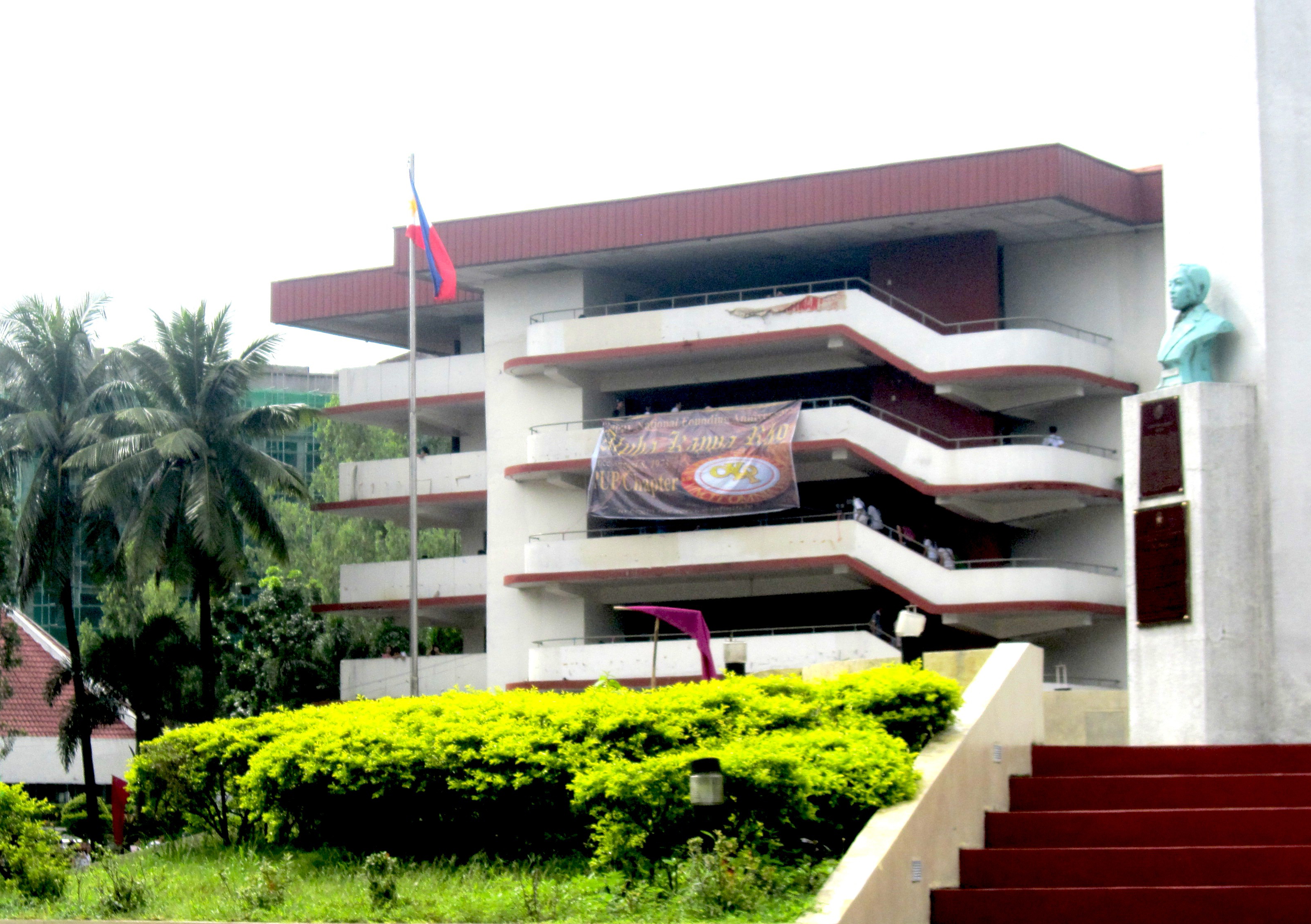
The Mabini Obelisk and Main Academic Building

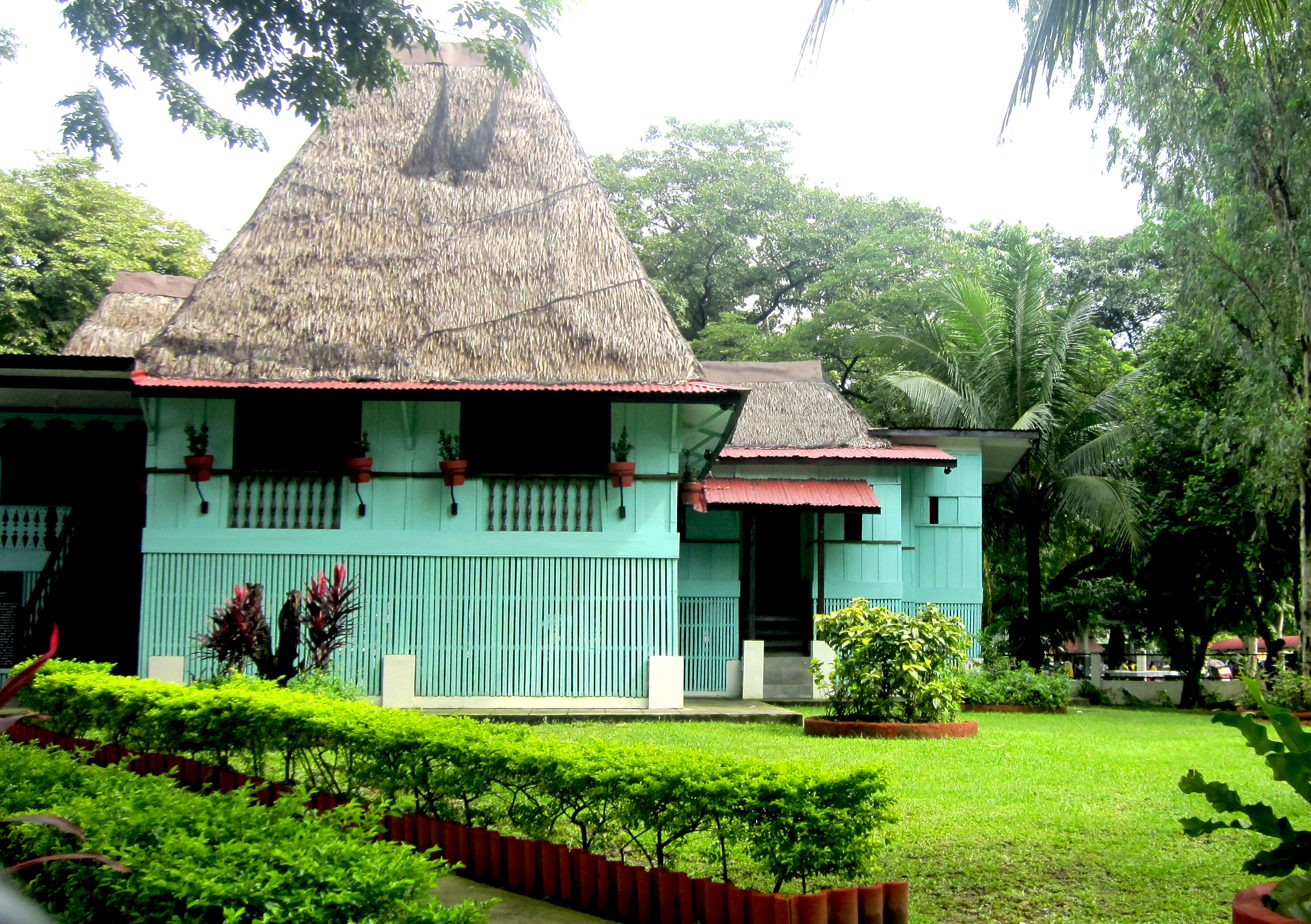
House of Apolinario Mabini, a registered cultural property of the country

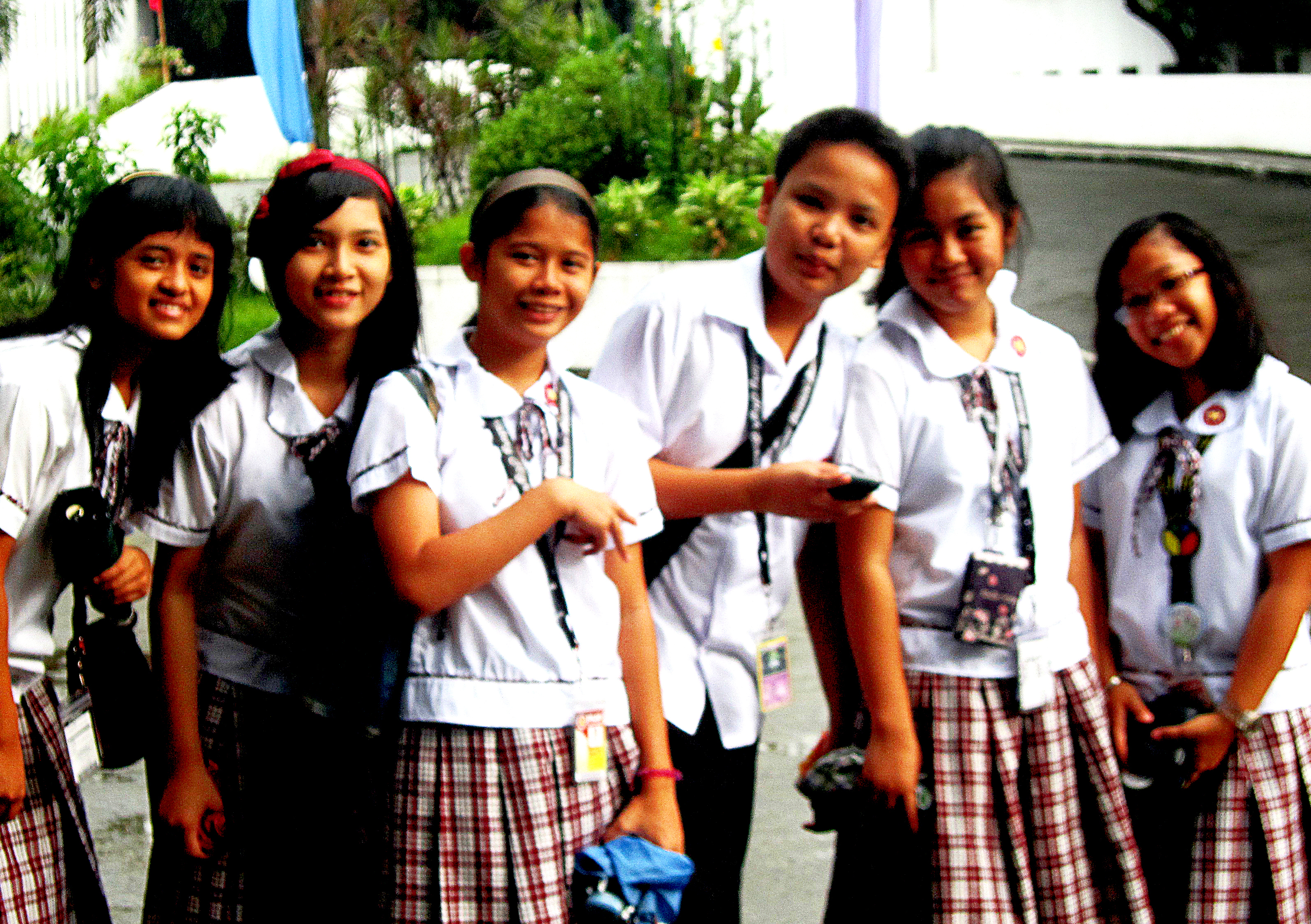
Students from the PUP Laboratory High School

In 1990, the Center for Distance Learning Education was established. The school also retained overall championship in both the SCUAA and PICUAA. The CEA Building in the NDC Compound Campus was also constructed. Among the achievements during this year were: assignment of rooms to the student council, completion of the construction of the Main Library, introduction of new courses, and the institution of several computerization projects.

Dr. Zenaida A. Olonan became the Officer-in-Charge after the retirement of Prudente in 1991, becoming the first woman to serve as the University President. For a short period time, from July 3-August 3 of 1992, Dr. Jaime Gellor served as the Acting President. Dr. Olanan was replaced by Dr. Ofelia M. Carague in 1998, who led a series of infrastructure improvements to the university. In 1997, President Fidel V. Ramos iterated his support for the computerization of the university, and in 1999 the university initiated a project for its modernization with the establishment of the Information Linkages Systems and the ICT Center. The operation of the ICT Center began in 2000 and was declared a Microsoft Certified Government Technology Education Center (GTEC). Also, the university obtained recognition as a Center for Development in the field of Information Technology from the Commission on Higher Education and recognized as Virtual Center for Technology Innovation in Information Technology by the Department of Science and Technology.

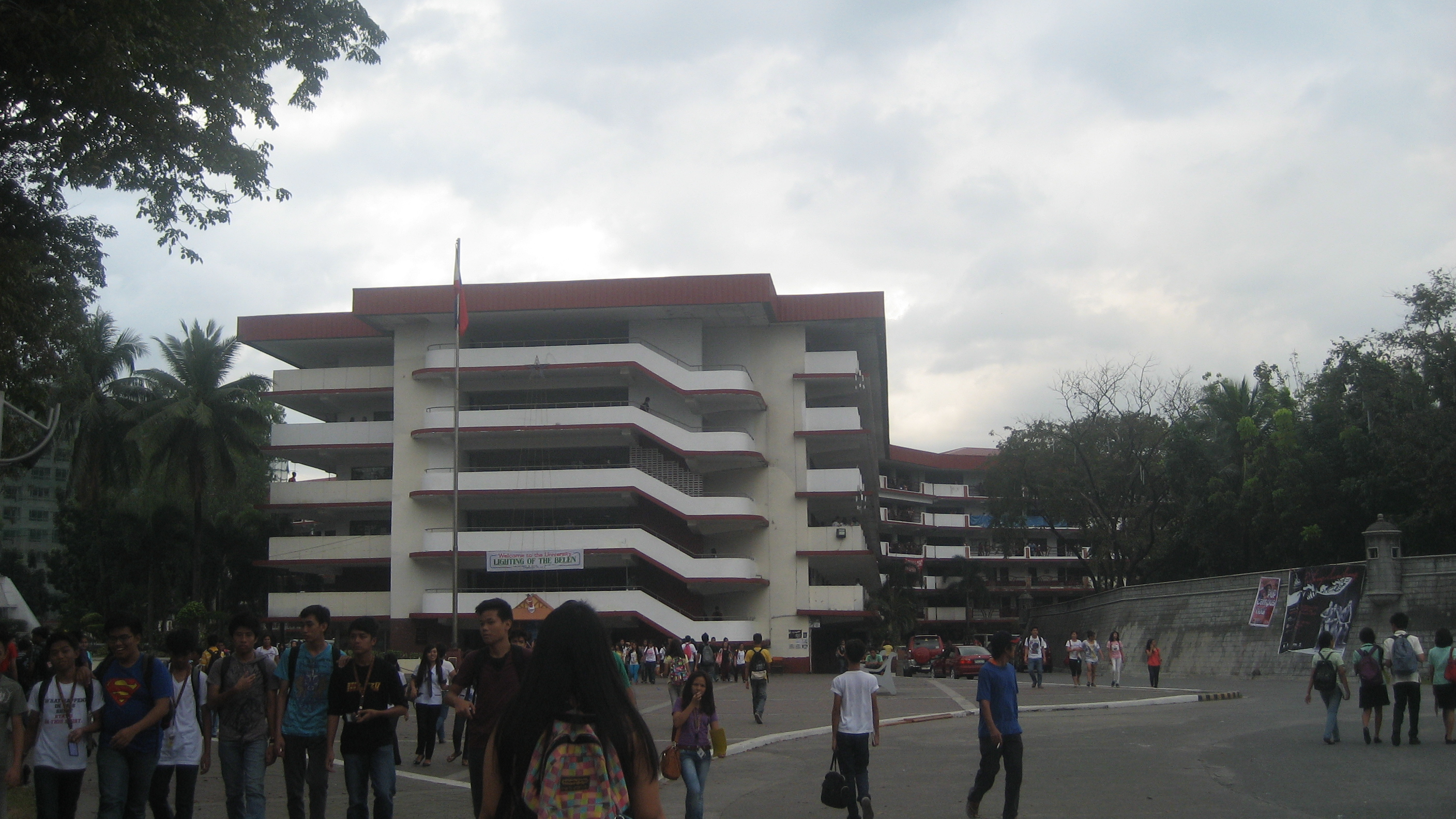
The Main Academic Building of the university

In 2003, Dr. Samuel M. Salvador became the Officer-in-Charge/Acting President of the university. His administration mainly focused on the upcoming centenary of the school and the improvements of the facilities of the university and its other campuses.

In 2004, the university celebrated its centennial anniversary with the theme "PUP: Kabalikat ng Pamahalaan sa Pag-angat ng Antas ng Kabuhayan ng Mamamayan". As part of the celebration and to highlight the signing of the Declaration of Peace to be put before the United Nations, the university broke the record for the world's largest human rainbow consisting of 30,365 students, faculty, staff and alumni.

In 2005, Dr. Dante G. Guevarra became the University President. His administration lasted 6 years, from 2005–2011. Highlights of his administration include: the construction and inauguration of the executive offices and conference rooms (Mateo, Olonan, and Carague) on the 2nd floor of the South Wing of the main building. This brought PUP's past presidents back home to the university where they served for years. PUPCET iApply, a Web-based PUP College Entrance Test (PUPCET) Application System was pre-released on December to accommodate PUPCET applicants until January 2006; PUP, in partnership with the San Juan City local government, opened the PUP San Juan Campus; The PUP Technical School became the College of Technology and offered short management technology courses in ICT, Computer Engineering, Electrical Engineering, Mechanical Engineering, and Electronics Communications Engineering. The Philippine president, Gloria Macapagal-Arroyo, declared Polytechnic University of the Philippines as the official permanent home of the Mabini Shrine. Through Proclamation 1992, President Arroyo stressed the need for a permanent home of the Mabini Shrine for the protection and preservation of its historical and architectural value. The President said that the PUP Mabini Campus is the fourth site of the Mabini Shrine. It was transferred in PUP through the National Historical Institute Board's Resolution No. 01, s. 2008, to protect it from the flood control project of the Metro Manila Development Authority (MMDA).

Dr. Guevarra would be replaced by Edicio G. dela Torre, who became the Officer-in-Charge for only two months while the Board of Regents searched for a new University President, although this decision did not set well with the faculty and students. Estelita Wi-Dela Rosa became the Officer-in-Charge on 2011 replacing dela Torre.

As of March 2012, Emanuel C. de Guzman formally sits as the University President. His administration is focused on clearing paths while laying new foundations to transform the Polytechnic University of the Philippines into an epistemic community with strategic objectives that include Pursuing Academic Excellence through Disciplinal Integrity; Embedding a Culture of Research; Assuring Transparency and Participation in Giving Rewards and Sanctions; Modernization and Upgrading of Physical Facilities, Equipment, Library and Campus Development; Reconceptualization of Academic Freedom; Institutionalizing Civil Society Engagement and Involved Extension Service Program; Fiscal Responsibility; and Assessment of the Institutional Processes and Critical-Rational Review of the Entire Organization.

Bills to grant national university status to the institution were vetoed by Presidents Rodrigo Duterte in 2019, and Bongbong Marcos in 2025.
