= Polytechnic University of the Philippines San Pedro =

Public university in Laguna, Philippines

Polytechnic University of the Philippines San Pedro Campus
- Seal of the Polytechnic University of the Philippines – San Pedro Campus
- Motto: Tanglaw ng Bayan
- Motto in English: Light of the Nation
- Type: State
- Established: April 9, 2009
- President: Emanuel de Guzman
- Director: Minerva D. Ferranco
- Location: San Pedro, Laguna, Philippines; 14°20′04″N 121°01′45″E
- Campus: Suburban
- Colors: Maroon and gold
- Nickname: PUP Mighty Maroons
- Mascot: PUPOY
- Website: www.pup.edu.ph

- Location in Laguna Location in Luzon Location in the Philippines

Polytechnic University of the Philippines – San Pedro Campus (PUP-SPC) is one of the campus units of the Polytechnic University of the Philippines located in San Pedro, Laguna, Philippines. It is one of the four PUP municipality-funded campuses in Laguna; the others are PUP Biñan Campus, PUP Santa Rosa Campus, and PUP Calauan Campus.

== History ==
PUP San Pedro Campus was established on April 9, 2002, as an open university center by virtue of a memorandum of agreement signed by then-Mayor Felicismo A. Vierneza of San Pedro, Laguna and then PUP President Ofelia M. Carague. PUP San Pedro initially offered a single curricular program, Bachelor of Science in Entrepreneurial Management. Two sections totaling 119 students enrolled in the courses were housed in a borrowed two-room building at the San Pedro Manpower Training Center (SPMTC) at the Elvinda Subdivision. Around 120 chairs were donated by then Laguna governor Teresita Lazaro.

== Campus ==
The San Pedro, Laguna campus of PUP has an Eco Park and Butterfly Sanctuary.

== Academics ==
College of Education (COED)

- Bachelor in Secondary Education (BSEd) Major in English
- Bachelor in Secondary Education (BSEd) Major in Mathematics

College of Business (CB)

- Bachelor of Science in Entrepreneurship (BSE)
- Bachelor of Science in Business Administration (BSBA) Major in Marketing Management
- Bachelor of Science in Business Administration (BSBA) Major in Human Resource Management

College of Computer Management and Information Technology (CCMIT)

- Bachelor of Science in Information Technology (BSIT)

College of Accountancy (COA)

- Bachelor of Science in Accountancy

== Extracurricular activity ==
The Polytechnic University of the Philippines San Pedro Campus annually conducts their Quest For Excellence Also known as Q4E in which students will participate into three categories (Academics, Sports, and Arts) to showcase not only their intellectual ability but also their skills and talents. The students are divided according to their respective organization to win an individual categorized competition. The Organization that gathers the most points will hail as Best Organization and will receive the Directors Cup.
