= Polytechnic University of the Philippines Cabiao =

Public university in Nueva Ecija, Philippines

Polytechnic University of the Philippines – Cabiao Campus
- Former name: Pamantasang Bayan ng Cabiao
- Motto: Tanglaw ng Bayan
- Motto in English: Light of the Nation
- Type: State
- Established: June 15, 1996
- President: Emanuel de Guzman
- Location: Cabiao, Nueva Ecija, Philippines; 15°14′24″N 120°51′27″E
- Colors: Maroon and gold
- Website: www.pup.edu.ph
- Location in Nueva Ecija Location in Luzon Location in the Philippines

Polytechnic University of the Philippines – Cabiao Campus is a state university located in Cabiao, Nueva Ecija, Philippines. It was established in June 1996 through a Memorandum of Agreement between the Municipal Government of Cabiao and the Polytechnic University of the Philippines.

== History ==
The university started as the Pamantasang Bayan ng Cabiao on June 15, 1996 through a Memorandum of Agreement between the Local Government Unit of Cabiao and the Polytechnic University of the Philippines. The school, which was then under the PUP Open University, initially offered courses in Computer Technology and Computer Secretarial catering to unemployed adults, out-of-school youth, and high school graduates who could not pursue college education because of financial constraints.

In 2009, the school decided to stop offering vocational programs in exchange for a four-year degree, Bachelor in Elementary Education.

Through the efforts of the Cabiao Local Government Unit headed by Hon. Mayor Gloria C. Congco and Hon. Vice-Mayor Ernesto S. Talens, Jr., the rest of Sangguniang Bayan members, and the Polytechnic University of the Philippines headed by Dr. Emanuel C. De Guzman, and Vice President for Branches and Campuses Dr. Joseph Mercado, the National Government funded the construction of a two-storey building with 12 classrooms. The construction was completed in February 2013 to accommodate more students. Through a Sangguniang Bayan Resolution, PUP Cabiao Campus offered its second course, Bachelor of Science in Business Administration major in Marketing Management.

== Academics ==
PUP Cabiao is composed of two colleges, the College of Education and the College of Business Administration. The campus formerly grants vocational programs under the PUP Open University. It ceased granting vocational courses in 2009 in exchange to offer a four-year degree. The two undergraduate programs are the Bachelor in Secondary Education and the Bachelor of Science in Business Administration Major in Marketing Management.
