= PUP SPEAK =

Student political party based in the Polytechnic University of the Philippines

- Students' Party for Equality and Advancement of Knowledge
- Predecessor: PUP Alliance Resisting Repression of Students (ARREST)
- Formation: September 8, 2014; 11 years ago
- Dissolved: 2022
- Type: Sociopolitical student organization
- Headquarters: Charlie del Rosario Building, Polytechnic University of the Philippines
- Location: Santa Mesa, Manila, Philippines
- Motto: The Iskolars united, will never be defeated!
- Key people: Medel "Dhel" Pulanco (Founder); Eli San Fernando, CSSD (Founding Chairperson)
- Subsidiaries: Sectoral affiliates: Women: Women's Initiative for Sustainable Development and Freedom (WISDOM); Environment: Solidarity for Environmental Education, Protection and Development Network (SEED Network); Artists: PUP Artists' Guild for Excellence (PAGE)
- Party flag and symbol

Students' Party for Equality and Advancement of Knowledge (SPEAK) was a non-profit student political party in the Polytechnic University of the Philippines (PUP). PUP SPEAK was one of the organizations that pushed for the university's "national polytechnic university" status, with an allocation of additional ₱3 billion budget annually. It also launched the "academic ease" campaign, where it pushed for the implementation of measures that aimed to help students and educators to quickly adapt to distance learning, brought by the COVID-19 pandemic. The campaign was supported by Education Secretary Leonor Briones. SPEAK also supports a smoke-free environment for the new normal.

== History and campaigns ==
SPEAK was formed after its predecessor, PUP Alliance Resisting Repression of Students (ARREST), successfully mounted a campaign to remove a college dean accused of corruption. Since then, the organization has focused on the issues of students' rights, women and LGBT rights, labor rights, environmental protection, anti-Marcos burial to heroes' cemetery, anti-religious discrimination, and anti-dictatorship, among many others. The organization had been the ruling political party of the PUP Central Student Council from 2016 to 2021. In 2017, the organization has been tagged as "[university] administration-leaning", after its founding chairman and then-incumbent PUP Central Student Council President Eli San Fernando organized the election of the student representative to the university's board of regents.

In 2020, SPEAK together with various organization under the leadership of Office of the Student Regent (OSR) held a benefit concert on the university oval grounds to support the mid-to-long-term rehabilitation of the communities affected by the Taal volcano eruption. The concert, which was attended by over 15,000 people, was headlined by Parokya ni Edgar, Itchyworms, Gloc-9, and Rocksteddy.

In the same year, SPEAK joined in decrying the detention of its member-volunteer from the mechanical engineering department over alleged violations of the enhanced community quarantine. Joining the call to release the student were human rights lawyers Chel Diokno and Erin Tanada, who called the arrest a form of "harassment". The Manila Police District has tagged the organization as a "rejectionist group" from the Communist Party of the Philippines divide and claimed that it was exploiting the arrest as part of its agitation-propaganda campaign against the Philippine National Police and the Duterte administration.
