= Polytechnic University of the Philippines Pulilan =

Public university in Bulacan, Philippines

Polytechnic University of the Philippines Pulilan Campus
- Politeknikong Unibersidad ng Pilipinas Pulilan (Filipino)
- Motto: Ang Pamantasan ng mga Mamamayan
- Motto in English: The People's University
- Type: Public
- Affiliations: SCUAA; ASAIHL; IAU
- President: Manuel M. Muhi
- Director: Prof. Marilyn F. Isip, PhD., LPT
- Location: Pulilan, Bulacan, Philippines; 14°54′07″N 120°50′39″E
- Colors: Maroon and Gold
- Website: www.pup.edu.ph
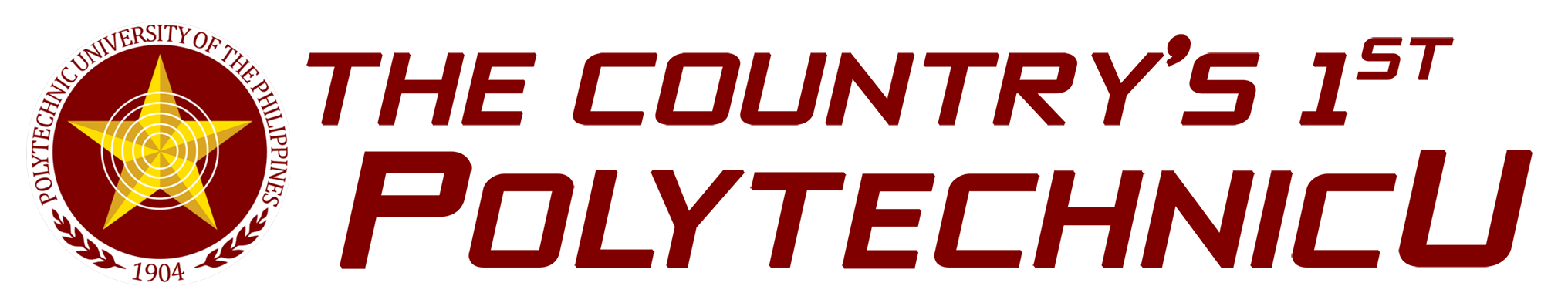

- Location in Bulacan Location in Luzon Location in the Philippines

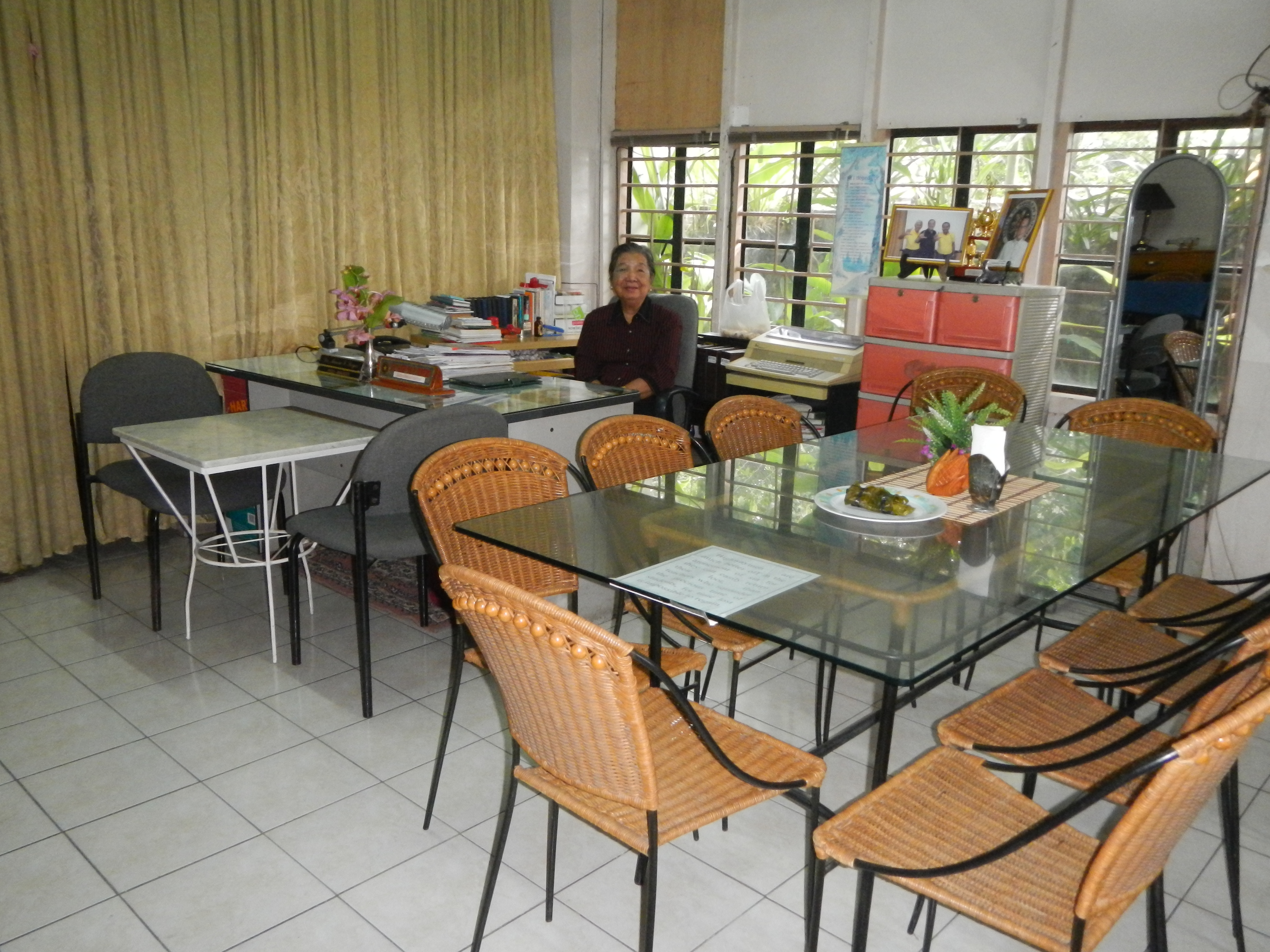
Administrator Aurora Reyes

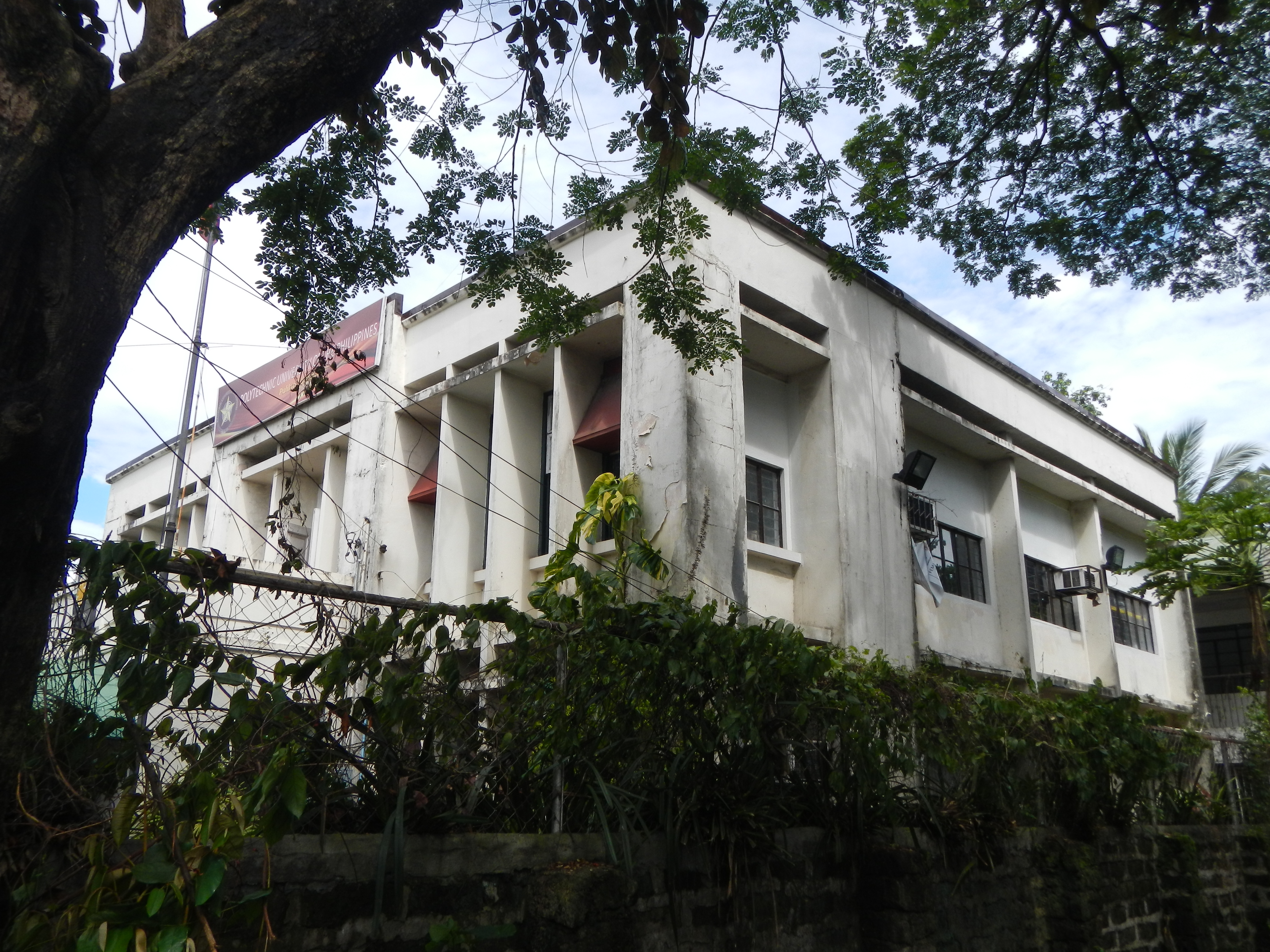
Facade

Polytechnic University of the Philippines Pulilan Campus or PUP Pulilan (Filipino: Politeknikong Unibersidad ng Pilipinas sa Pulilan) is PUP campus located in the municipality of Pulilan, Bulacan, Philippines.

The campus was created through a Memorandum of Agreement (MOA) between the University and the Municipal Government of Pulilan.

== History ==
The roots of the Polytechnic University of the Philippines (PUP) Pulilan Campus may be traced to the ardent desire of the Local Government of Pulilan, Bulacan, to provide underprivileged secondary school graduates of the municipality with opportunities to pursue higher education. The establishment of the Campus served as a response to the educational needs of the youth who faced limited opportunities for college education and, consequently, a lack of qualifications necessary for employment and further personal development.

The Campus was first established in 2000 as a Learning Center of the PUP Open University before it was recognized as an independent PUP campus in 2008. During its early years, the Campus was housed in the old Municipal Building of the Municipality of Pulilan in Poblacion, Pulilan, Bulacan, adjacent to the Old Casanova House. The Campus shared the building with the Public Employment Service Office (PESO) of Pulilan and the Office for Senior Citizens Affairs (OSCA).

As the Campus continued to develop and expand its services, the need for a permanent and more suitable site became increasingly important. Through the support of the Local Government of Pulilan and the generosity of the Suarez Family, a parcel of land in Barangay Balatong B, Pulilan, Bulacan was donated for educational purposes. Sangguniang Bayan Resolution No. 115-2016 authorized the Municipal Mayor to sign, for and on behalf of the Municipal Government of Pulilan, the Deed of Donation between the Municipality and Mr. Oscar H. Suarez. The resolution records that the Suarez family, through Oscar H. Suarez, donated a 7,306-square-meter parcel of land located in Barangay Balatong B, with the property designated for school purposes for the residents of Pulilan and nearby barangays.

Following the development of the new site, the PUP Pulilan Campus transferred to its present location in Balatong B on March 23, 2023. The new campus site is situated along Luna Street, Barangay Balatong B, Pulilan, Bulacan, adjacent to the Balatong B Elementary School and the Balatong B Barangay Hall. The transfer marked an important milestone in the continuing development of the Campus, providing a more permanent and dedicated environment for instruction, administration, student activities, and community engagement.

At present, the PUP Pulilan Campus is a higher education institution in Bulacan that provides equitable access to free, quality tertiary education to residents of Pulilan and nearby communities. It seeks to improve the quality of life of its students and communities by producing globally competitive and patriotic citizens who contribute to the development of the community and the nation. The Campus likewise aims to produce quality research studies and implement sustainable extension programs responsive to the needs of the community.

The campus has the goal of being a top-performing university in the region in cooperation with the local government of Pulilan, Bulacan, and the Polytechnic University of the Philippines. It aims to offer quality, excellent curricula that are relevant and responsive to the needs of students, faculty, and other partners while also addressing the changing needs of the community.

== Academics ==
- Bachelor of Science in Entrepreneurship
- Bachelor of Public Administration with specialization in Fiscal Administration
