= Eli San Fernando =

Filipino labor leader and politician (born 1996)

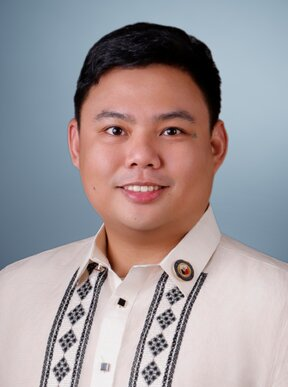
- Official portrait, 2025

Member of the Philippine House of Representatives for the Kamanggagawa Partylist
- Incumbent
- Assumed office June 30, 2025

Student Regent of the Polytechnic University of the Philippines
- In office 2017–2018
- Preceded by: Karl Paulie Anareta
- Succeeded by: Ronilo Cervante

President of the Polytechnic University of the Philippines Student Council
- In office 2017–2018
- Preceded by: Jonald Bagasina
- Succeeded by: Ralyn Rodriguez

Personal details
- Born: Elijah Rumbaoa San Fernando; August 13, 1996 (age 30) Quezon City, Philippines
- Party: Kamanggagawa (2024–present)
- Other political affiliations: Alternatiba (2022–2024)
- Education: Polytechnic University of the Philippines (BS)
- Occupation: Labor leader; union organizer; politician
- Known for: Student and labor activism

Elijah Rumbaoa San Fernando (born August 13, 1996) is a Filipino labor leader, politician and Internet personality currently serving as member of the Philippine House of Representatives for the Kamanggagawa party-list. San Fernando ran as the party's first nominee in the 2025 midterm elections. He previously served as the secretary-general of Alternatiba from 2022 to 2024 and was involved in student leadership as Student Regent of the Polytechnic University of the Philippines (PUP).

== Early life and education ==
San Fernando was born in Quezon City. His mother was a public school teacher, while his father served as a Protestant pastor. He pursued his undergraduate studies at the Polytechnic University of the Philippines (PUP), earning a Bachelor of Science in Economics in 2018.

== Political involvement ==
=== Student politics ===
San Fernando was elected as vice president of the Polytechnic University of the Philippines Sta. Mesa campus student council in 2016 under the banner of the newly-established PUP SPEAK, then eventually acceded to the presidency in 2017. In September of the same year, San Fernando was elected by 25 of 35 members of the university system-wide student council federation as its president, making him the Student Regent representing students at the university's highest decision-making body, the Board of Regents.

=== Labor organizing ===
San Fernando was the secretary-general of the political organization Alternatiba from 2022 to 2024. The group figured in the news for filing a graft complaint against a Department of Agriculture official in 2023. He was also Vice President of the National Federation of Labor during this period. San Fernando filed his candidacy as first nominee of the newly-founded Kamanggagawa Party-list on October 1, 2024. He won as the Representative of the Kamanggagawa party-list during the 2025 Philippine House of Representatives elections.

=== Digital activism ===
In June 2024, San Fernando started creating content on social media that championed workers rights, exposed labor abuses, and condemned corrupt government officials. His main campaign slogan called for the abolition of the "provincial rate," the differing minimum wave levels across regions. San Fernando's online content soon turned viral, and had been credited by his campaigners as a major factor for their 2025 electoral gains. His Tiktok account gained one million followers in the course of the midterm election campaign. But he also faced cyber libel charges in connection with a social media post.

== Electoral history ==
Electoral history of Eli San Fernando
Year	Office	Party	Votes received				Result
Year	Office	Party	Total	%	P.	Swing	Result
2025	Representative (Party-list)	Kamanggagawa	382,657	0.91%	29th	—N/a	Won
