= Polytechnic University of the Philippines Mulanay =

Public university in Quezon, Philippines

Polytechnic University of the Philippines Mulanay Branch
- Politeknikong Unibersidad ng Pilipinas sa Mulanay (Filipino)
- Motto: Tanglaw ng Bayan
- Type: Satellite campus
- Established: 1993
- President: Manuel Muhi
- Director: Dir. Adelia R. Roadilla
- Location: Mulanay, Quezon, Philippines; 13°31′47″N 122°23′34″E
- University hymn: Imno ng PUP (PUP Hymn)
- Colors: Maroon and Gold
- Mascot: Pylon
- Website: www.pup.edu.ph
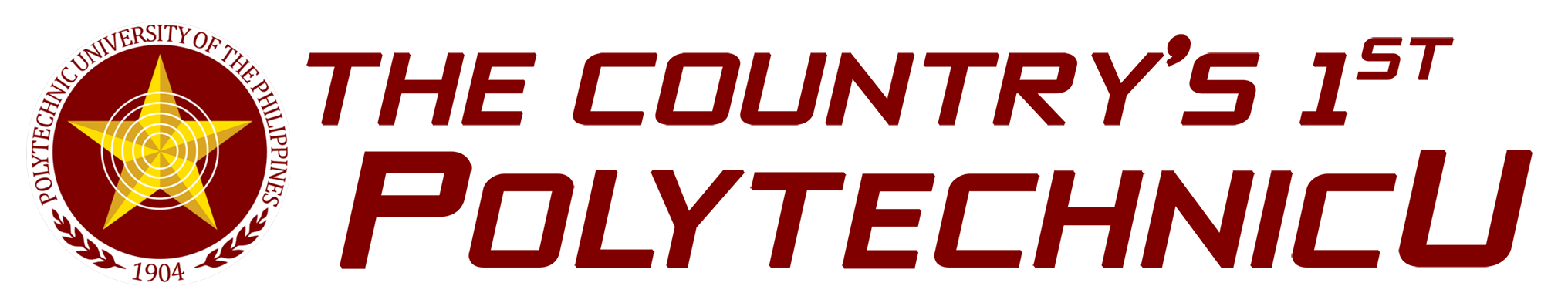

- Location in Luzon Location in the Philippines

The Polytechnic University of the Philippines, Mulanay Extension also known as PUP-MQ (Filipino: Politeknikong Unibersidad ng Pilipinas, Sudlong ng Mulanay) is a satellite campus of the Polytechnic University of the Philippines founded through Republic Act 7654, otherwise known as the General Appropriations Act of 1991. It is located at Mulanay, Quezon, Philippines.

== Undergraduate programs ==
College of Education (COED)

- Bachelor of Business Teacher Education (BBTE)

College of Business (CB)

- Bachelor of Science in Entrepreneurial Management (BSEM)
- Bachelor of Science in Agri-Business Management (BSABM)
- Bachelor of Office Administration (BOA)

College of Technology (CT)

- Diploma in Office Management Technology (DOMT)
