= Polytechnic University of the Philippines General Luna =

Public university in Quezon, Philippines

Polytechnic University of the Philippines General Luna Branch
- Politeknikong Unibersidad ng Pilipinas, Sudlong sa General Luna (Filipino)
- Motto: Tanglaw ng Bayan
- Type: State University, Public University
- Established: June 2009
- President: Manuel Muhi
- Director: Adelia R. Roadilla, DEM
- Location: General Luna, Quezon, Philippines; 13°41′27″N 122°10′17″E
- University hymn: Imno ng PUP (PUP Hymn)
- Colors: Maroon and Gold
- Mascot: Pylon
- Website: www.pup.edu.ph
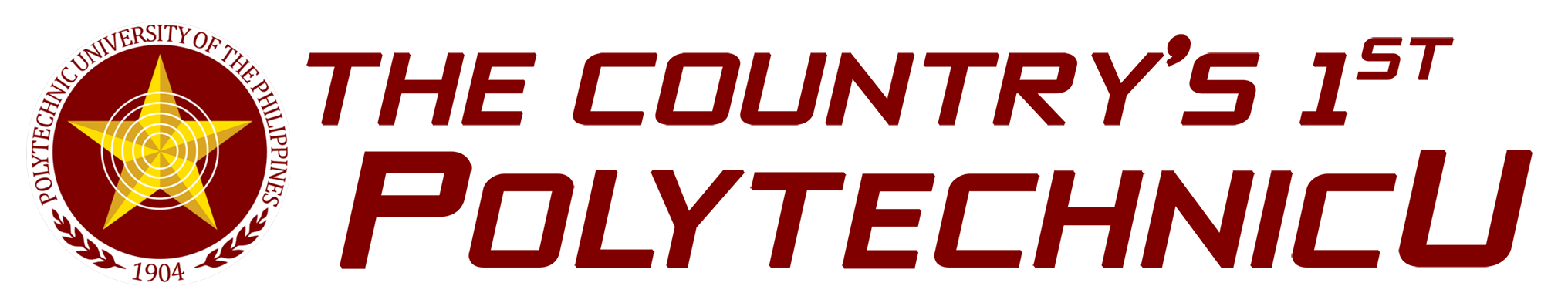

- Location in Luzon Location in the Philippines

The Polytechnic University of the Philippines, General Luna also known as PUP-GLQ (Filipino: Politeknikong Unibersidad ng Pilipinas, Sudlong sa General Luna) is one of the four (4) satellite campuses of the Polytechnic University of the Philippines in Quezon province located at General Luna, Quezon, Philippines. The only undergraduate program being offered in this extension is the Bachelor in Elementary Education.

== Courses ==
=== Undergraduate Programs ===
- Bachelor in Elementary Education (BEED)
- Bachelor of Science in Business Administration (BSBA) major in Marketing Management
