= Polytechnic University of the Philippines Student Council =

Official student union of the Polytechnic University of the Philippines

Polytechnic University of the Philippines Student Council Konseho ng Mag-aaral ng Politeknikong Unibersidad ng Pilipinas
- Academic Year 2026-2027
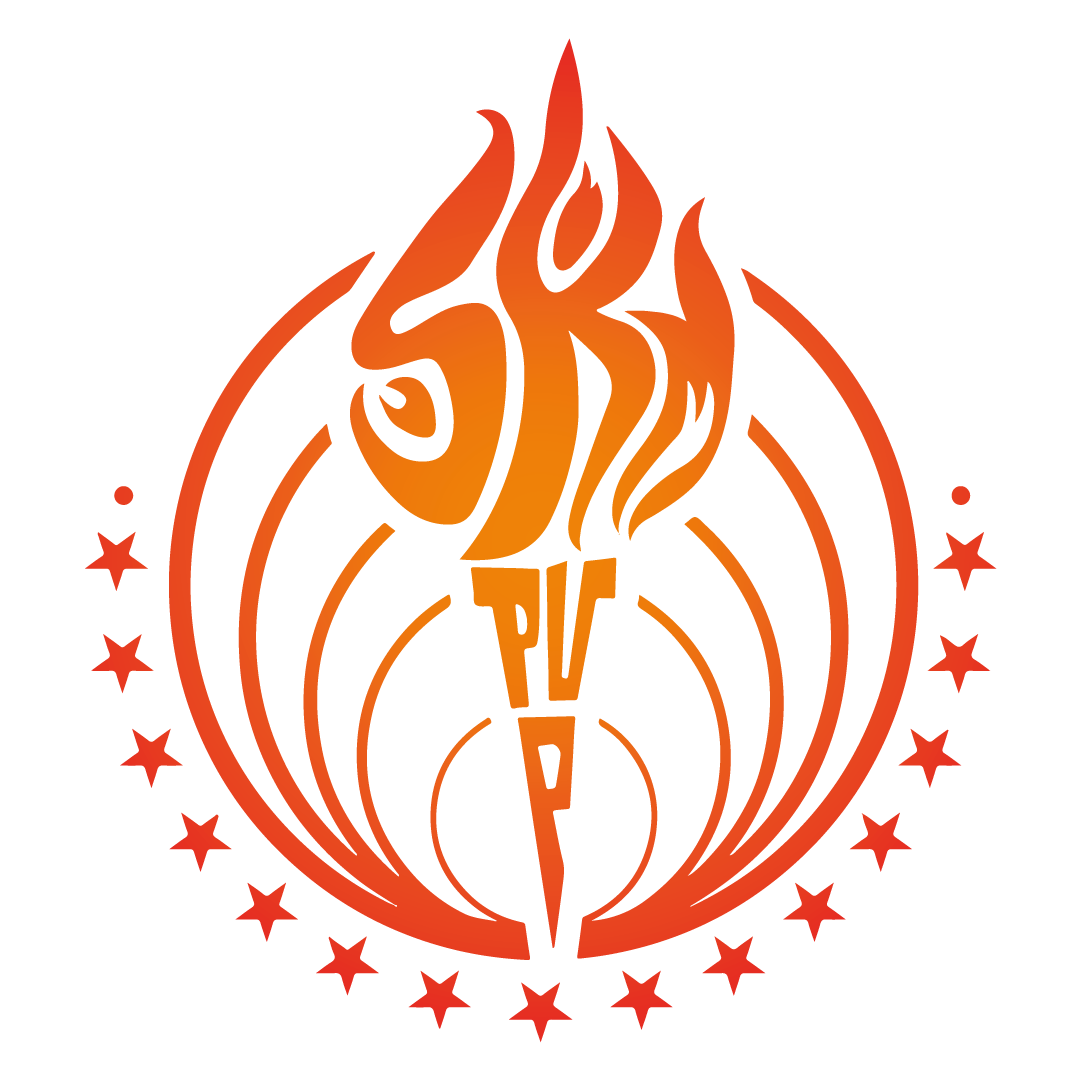
- PUP SKM Official Logo

Type
- Type: Representative body of the students of Polytechnic University of the Philippines

History
- Established: 1969 (representation in the University Board)
- New session started: November 7, 2025

Leadership
- President: Manuel A. Villanueva, Sinagtala Coalition since November 2026
- Vice President: Cherry Jhoana C. Ubani, Sinagtala Coalition since November 2026
- Secretary-General: TBD
- Treasurer: TBD
- Chairperson, PUP SC COMELEC: Mark David L. Bartolata
- Chairperson, PUP SC COSOA: Gwynneth Bernadette A. Florin
- Chairperson, PUP SC COA: Shela Santrose Ribian D. Yan
- Chief Magistrate, Student Tribunal: N/A

Structure
- Seats: 19 (SCA); 14 (CSC/SKM); 8 (LSCs); 15 (SC-COMELEC); 3 (SC-COSOA); 5 (SC-COA); 5 (SC-ST)
- Length of term: One academic year

Elections
- Voting system: First-past-the-post

Meeting place
- Charlie del Rosario Building, Polytechnic University of the Philippines, Santa Mesa, Manila

Constitution
- 2013 PUP Student Council Constitution

The Polytechnic University of the Philippines Student Council (PUP SC) (Filipino: Konseho ng Mag-aaral ng Politeknikong Unibersidad ng Pilipinas), formerly known as Philippine College of Commerce Supreme Student Council (PCC SSC) before 1972, is the official undergraduate student union and prime representative of the student body of the Polytechnic University of the Philippines – Manila Campuses. It represents the interests of the students on the university, national, and global issues.

As the collective student representation in the university, the central and college student councils are composed of members elected amongst the student body of Manila Campuses, mandated to organize and direct campaigns and activities to defend and promote students’ rights and general welfare. Furthermore, it provides direct services to the student body.

The PUP Student Council is composed of the Sentral na Konseho ng Mag-aaral (SKM), also known as the PUP Central Student Council (CSC), the local student councils of all existing colleges, including Open University System (OUS) and Institute of Technology (ITech); and four (4) independent bodies namely: Student Council Commission on Audit (SC COA), Student Council Commission on Elections (SC COMELEC), Student Council Commission on Student Organizations and Accreditation (SC COSOA), and Student Council Student Tribunal (SC ST).

The Executive Committee of the PUP SKM is composed of the President, Vice President, Secretary-General, and Treasurer, who, together with the presidents of all college student councils from the Manila campuses, constitute the PUP Student Council Assembly (SCA), the highest decision and policy-making body of student councils at the PUP Main Campus, undergraduate level.

In contrast, the Alyansa ng Nagkakaisang Konseho (ANAK) PUP serves as the unified alliance and official federation of all student councils across the entire PUP System, including satellite campuses outside the Main Campus.

== History and advocacies ==
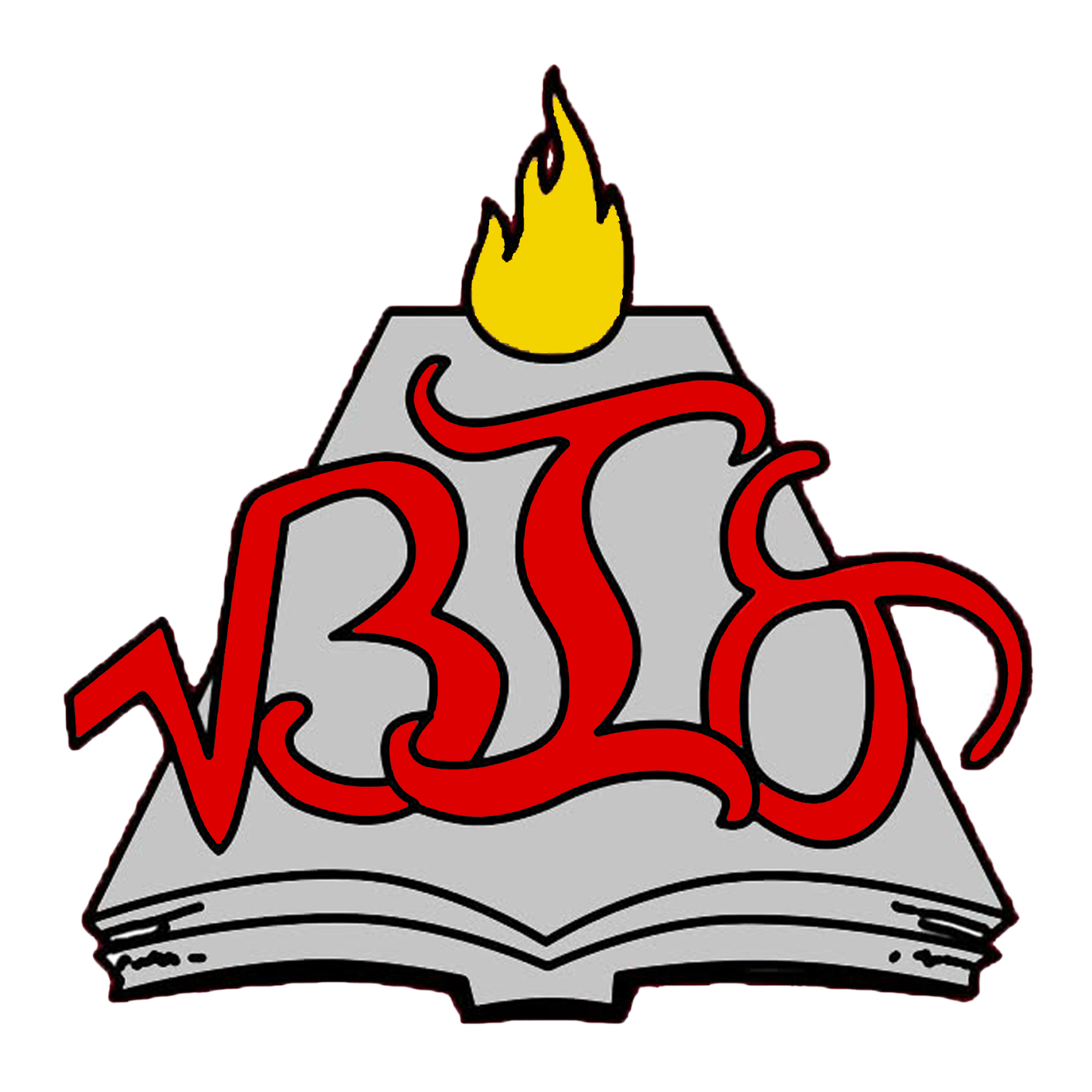
Previous Logo of PUP SKM

In 1969, then-Philippine College of Commerce (PCC) President Nemesio Prudente included the student council in the board of trustees of the college.

In 1972, the student council was abolished due to the proclamation of martial law. Five years after the PCC was converted into a chartered state university and renamed Polytechnic University of the Philippines (PUP), the student council was eventually revived in 1983 with its constitution and by-laws being drafted and ratified.

In 1990, Prudente, who was reappointed as PUP president, assigned the student union hall (now called Charlie del Rosario Building) and certain rooms in the main academic building to the PUP SKM, accredited student organizations, cultural groups, and major student publications.

=== PUP SPEAK's domination (2016 - 2021) ===
From 2016 to 2021, the Students' Party for Equality and Advancement of Knowledge (SPEAK) had been the ruling political party of the PUP Student Council.

In July 2019, ahead of the fourth State of the Nation Address of President Rodrigo Duterte, the College of Communication Student Council (COC SC) was among the youth groups invited to Rappler's MovePH Huddle to discuss on several issues. On the youth sector's efforts to campaign for a coal-free Negros, COC SC's Neilvin John Aventurado shared that "the government should be listening or they should be aiming for the protection of our environment and the people who benefit from it" after expressing sadness by the fact that the youth had to conduct protests just to be heard.

In February 2020, the PUP SKM, together with various organization under the leadership of PUP Office of the Student Regent (OSR) held a benefit concert on the university oval grounds to support the mid-to-long-term rehabilitation of the communities affected by the Taal volcano eruption. The concert, which was attended by over 15,000 people, was headlined by Parokya ni Edgar, Itchyworms, Gloc-9, and Rocksteddy.

In April 2020, the PUP SKM joined in decrying the detention of Rexon Aumentado, a mechanical engineering department and community volunteer, over alleged violations of the enhanced community quarantine. Joining the call to release the student were human rights lawyers Chel Diokno and Erin Tanada, who called the arrest a form of "harassment".

In April 2021, the College of Accountancy and Finance Student Council (CAF SC) urged the university to extend the "academic break" from April 5 to April 11 amidst rising COVID-19 cases. It insisted that the students and the professors are "not mentally and practically ready to start the new semester,” as it also pointed out that they were immobilized due to the extended community quarantine and its border restrictions.

In January 2021, the PUP SKM was among the stakeholders of the university to condemn the proposal of Duterte Youth Rep. Ducielle Cardema to Department of National Defense to abrogate its 1990 accord with the university, a day after the abrogation of its 1989 accord with the University of the Philippines. The accord stated that the police and military forces must give prior notification to the university president before conducting any operation on any PUP branches and campuses. PUP SKM President Jonero Dacula and PUP Board of Regents student representative Ellenor Bartolome submitted a position paper to Cardema opposing the termination of the PUP-DND agreement. In their position paper, Dacula and Bartolome highlighted a key provision in the PUP-DND accord, which recognized the right of all students “to freely advocate their ideas on the campus with utmost tolerance, understanding and guarantee, without fear of interference and intervention or repression from the state, or any of its agencies and instrumentalities.”

=== SAMASA PUP's return to power (2021 - 2026) ===
In September 2021, Miss Trans Global 2021's Duchess Global Albiean Revalde, an engineering student, was elected as the first trans woman president of the PUP SKM; and Sandigan ng Mag-aaral para sa Sambayanan (SAMASA) became the ruling political party of the PUP Student Council once again after five years.

A day after the International Human Rights Day in 2021, the PUP SKM declared the National Task Force to End Local Communist Armed Conflict (NTF-ELCAC) and Hands Off Our Children Movement (HOOCM) persona non grata in the university after claiming the NTF-ELCAC's "records of baseless red-tagging and HOOCM being an enabler in silencing progressive youths through a facade of psycho-social services."

In 2023, Kim Modelo was elected as the 2nd trans woman SKM President unopposed. She also became the 1st trans woman Student Regent of the University.

=== Azusano controversy, SAMASA's fall, and independents' rise to power (2026 - present) ===
In 2026, an anonymous post on Reddit rumored that Student Regent and SKM President John Paul Y. Azusano is not enrolled for the current academic term, which was followed by a series of posts and clamors by the entire student body both in PUP Manila as well as in other PUP Campuses calling for Azusano to publish a statement to address the issue, but to no avail. The rumor was then confirmed by Azusano himself, during the Emergency Meeting of ANAK PUP, stating that he is not enrolled since the first semester of Academic Year 2026-2027. Azusano subsequently placed under preventive suspension of duties pending a formal impeachment deliberations. Azusano later resigned from the post. In a statement posted on his social media, he said that he is willing to cooperate with any official investigation or proceedings conducted by the 26th ANAK PUP Congress to ensure a fair process and appropriate accountability, and that he acknowledged that the matter went beyond a personal lapse, writing that it “could have jeopardized the rights and representation of more than 107,000 students in our University relying on a legitimate Regent that the Board will recognize and reckon with.” During the emergency meeting, ANAK PUP voted Cherry Jhoana Ubani to temporarily assume the position as an OIC, only to declare it void the next day as it is unconstitutional and was only created as a response to Azusano's Preventive Suspension. The new student regent will be decided by the members of ANAK PUP on a special session on 10 November and will finish the remaining months left by former Student Regent Azusano.

A similar precedent has happened in 2017 when former Student Regent Karl Paulie Anareta was likewise booted out by the Board of Regents after knowing that he is not enrolled.

During the canvassing of votes for the PUP Student Council Elections 2026, PUP COMELEC, in their decision, disqualifies SAMASA-SKM Slate and SAMASA-College of Science Slate for multiple violations during and after election campaigns. While in PUP College of Social Sciences and Development (CSSD) and College of Engineering (CE), abstentions overtook the lone slate, both colleges were fielded by SAMASA through local political group SAMASA-CSSD and SAMASA-CE. PUP COMELEC investigates this peculiar result and found no ground to invalidate election results or withheld the proclamation of the winning candidates. Furthermore, they recognize that the abstention vote from CSSD and CE is a manifestation of their preference and can figuratively regarded as "super-candidate". They also encourage students from the said colleges to field candidates for future Student Council Elections.

== Composition ==
=== Sentral na Konseho ng Mag-aaral / Central Student Council ===
2026 to 2027
Name	Position	Party	College
Manuel A. Villanueva	President	Sinagtala Coalition	COA
Cherry Jhoana Ubani	Vice President	Sinagtala Coalition	CPSPA
Adrianne Athea Atender	Councilor	Sinagtala Coalition	CBA
Althacia Angeles	Councilor	Sinagtala Coalition	COA
Chelsy Mae Flores	Councilor	PUP SINTA	COA
Angel Justine Cruz	Councilor	PUP SINTA	ITech
Alrhena Vhenice Alber	Councilor	PUP SINTA	CPSPA
Franco Manuel C. Pinca	Councilor	Sinagtala Coalition	CPSPA
Johan Gavie Marzan	Councilor	Sinagtala Coalition	CPSPA
Dainiel Muñoz	Councilor	PUP SINTA	CS
Cyruz Amandoron	Councilor	PUP SINTA	COC
Justin Villanueva	Councilor	PUP SINTA	CAL
Jaypee Cordova (Note: Originally 13th place, moved due to SAMASA's disqualification)	Councilor	PUP SINTA	CPSPA
Gabriel Ivan Varez (Note: Originally 14th place, moved due to SAMASA's disqualification)	Councilor	PUP SINTA	CPSPA

2025 to 2026
Name	Position	Party	College
John Paul Y. Azusano	President	SAMASA PUP	CCIS
Tracy Althea Ramos	Vice President	SAMASA PUP	COC
Michael Dave Bolima	Secretary-General and Councilor; Head of the Volunteer Corps and Secretariat Committee	SAMASA PUP	OUS
Suharto Darling Buleg Jr.	Treasuer and Councilor; Head of the Finance, Ways, and Means Committee	SAMASA PUP	COA
Noriko Wade Alsisto	Councilor; Head of the Athletes' Welfare and Sports Development Committee	SAMASA PUP	CHK
Frank Araneta	Councilor; Head of the Legal, Parliamentary, and Ethics Committee	Independent	COC
Trejvor Dayao	Councilor; Head of the People's Advocacy and Campaign Committee	SAMASA PUP	ITech
Christian Lloyd Delante	Appointed Councilor; Head of the Organization and Press Relations Committee	SAMASA PUP	CPSPA
Kimberly Akisha Eugenio	Councilor; Head of the External Affairs and Network Committee	SAMASA PUP	CSSD
John Joshua Evangelista	Councilor; Head of the Educational Affairs and Research Committee	SAMASA PUP	CTHTM
Leif Josef Hizon	Councilor; Head of the Students' Rights and Welfare Committee	SAMASA PUP	CoEd
Von Eiron Plicerda	Councilor; Head of the Gender Diversity, Inclusivity, and Safe Spaces Committee	SAMASA PUP	CoEd
Lorenzo Salvador	Councilor; Head of the Academic Affairs and Student Services Committee	SAMASA PUP	CSSD
Jelaine Avril Tupaz	Councilor; Head of the Mass Media and Culture Committee	SAMASA PUP	CBA

2024 to 2025
- Tiffany Faith Brillante, President
- Lance Casuyon, Vice President
- Neilvin John Aventurado, Secretary-General
- Gean Matthew Rebulado, Treasurer
- Noriko Wade Alsisto, Councilor
- Bryan Amlane Alonzo, Councilor
- Alfonso Bernard De Leon, Councilor
- CJ Diaz, Councilor
- Sharnonn Aaire Guinto, Councilor
- Rya Halabi, Councilor
- Neriza Janelle Ignacio, Councilor
- Maria Zoinah Lappay, Councilor
- Reynalyn Layones, Resigned Councilor
- Shaine Althea Ocampo, Resigned Councilor
2023 to 2024
- Kim Lloyd Modelo, President
- Abbygail Alforque, Vice President
- Johnson Danila, Secretary-General
- Terrence Lander Tamayosa, Treasurer
- Adrian Abelligos, Councilor
- John Vincent Bingayan, Councilor
- Kim Nicole Bombales, Councilor
- CJ Diaz, Councilor
- Joonrei Lejandro Domanais, Councilor
- Jullianne Hyacinth Joven, Councilor
- Jamella Lacap, Councilor
- Marygold Lazaro, Councilor
- Quieny Prince Mayor, Councilor
- Noemi Paula Pardo, Councilor
- John Reggie Reyes, Councilor
2022 to 2023
- Kirchhoff Thomas Angala, President
- Benhur Queqquegan, Vice President
- Kim Lloyd Modelo, Secretary-General
- Gwyneth Ivory Marbella, Treasurer
- Deniel Canaway, Councilor
- John Chrizel Corre, Councilor
- Angelo Cruz, Councilor
- Dannah Patricia Francia, Councilor
- Gurdheep Hampal, Councilor
- Angelo Mamis, Councilor
- Jean Jayson Nobleza, Councilor
- Robert Victor Oclida, Councilor
- Erwin John Rimando, Councilor
- Matthew Christian Santos, Councilor
- Al Jay Torreña, Councilor
2021 to 2022
- Albiean Revalde, President
- Kirchhoff Thomas Angala, Vice President
- Vanessa Mae Llana, Secretary-General
- Anna Kristina Mutuc, Treasurer
- Erika Baclor, Councilor
- Mary Joyce Borlagon, Councilor
- Meinard Buenavente, Councilor
- Glenn Joshua Casupanan, Councilor
- Caryl Cortez, Councilor
- Robert Owen Ganado, Councilor
- Kyla Marasigan, Councilor
- Edrian Morales, Councilor
- April Rose Parallag, Councilor
- April Villanueva, Councilor
2019 to 2021
- Jonero Dacula, President
- John Joseph Geron, Vice President
- Aubrey Garganera, Secretary-General and OIC since 2021
- Christian Arizo, Councilor
- John Paul Casinillo, Councilor
- Angelo Chua, Councilor
- Alvin David, Councilor
- Celine dela Cruz, Councilor
- Richard Diaz, Councilor
- Jessalyn Galapon, Councilor
- Nina Nunez, Councilor
- Milanisa Punut, Councilor
2018 to 2019
- Ralyn Rodriguez, President
- Marc Angelo Sanchez, Vice President
- Princess Shaine Abante, Councilor
- Leogene Bomitivo, Councilor
- Melanie Calimlim, Councilor
- Donariz Cristino, Councilor
- Jonero Dacula, Councilor
- Rosalie Dena, Councilor
- John Rey Magbanua, Councilor
- Christine Pedregosa, Councilor
- Jomar Sobiono, Councilor
- Deanne Trinidad, Councilor
- Karl Patrick Utsig, Councilor
- Ivy Collene Villamor, Councilor
2016 to 2018
- Jonald Bagasina, President (until 2017)
- Elijah San Fernando, Vice President and since 2017, President
- Vallery Claire Amador, Councilor
- Kristopher Avelino, Councilor
- Ernesto Jesus Bautista, Councilor
- Karen Bonjoc, Councilor
- Melanie Calimlim, Councilor
- Marynelle Carreon, Councilor
- John Kenneth Contreras, Councilor
- Rosalie Dena, Councilor
- Nico Librojo, Councilor
- Rohany Mimbalawag, Councilor
- Gerrimar Mindana, Councilor
- Deanne Trinidad, Councilor
2015 to 2016
- Alyssa Manalo, President
- Emil Luancing, Vice President
- Alyssa Jasmine Lapira, Councilor
- Francis Joshua Rodriguez, Councilor
- Leonard Bauio, Councilor
- Rhea Mae Dominguez, Councilor
- Joie Sayen, Councilor
- John Carlo Briones, Councilor
- Ryan Joy Faminiano, Councilor
- John Paul Rosos, Councilor
- Richter Job Silva, Councilor
- Alexis Danday, Councilor
- Melco Guliban, Councilor
- Monique Perez, Councilor
2014 to 2015
- Jessica Ferrera, President
- Angelo Faurillo Jr., Vice President
- Monica Nepomuceno, Councilor
- Berlin Angelo Datiles, Councilor
- George D II Burac, Councilor
- Carlo Cabanes, Councilor
- Emar Tumambiling, Councilor
- John Christopher Amante, Councilor
- Jannard Lindio, Councilor
- Eishalyn Anne Masula, Councilor
- Mark Anthony Van Deogracias, Councilor
- Cate Tuddao, Councilor
- Aldhessa Joyce Morillo, Councilor
- Amen Fabul Gandamato, Councilor
2011 to 2012
- Fatima Villanueva, President
- Mark Olivarez, Vice President
- Camille Manangan, Councilor
- Robin Allan Banaag, Councilor
- Harline Honrado, Councilor
- Kiefer John Cortez, Councilor
- Mary Ann Santiago, Councilor
- Raven Desposado, Councilor
- Jomel Nacional, Councilor
- Karl Michael Nadunza, Councilor
- Regina Marie Gustilo, Councilor
- Mary Kaylene Grecia, Councilor
- Michael Haris Mahusay, Councilor
- John Kenneth Evangelista, Councilor

=== Student Council Assembly ===
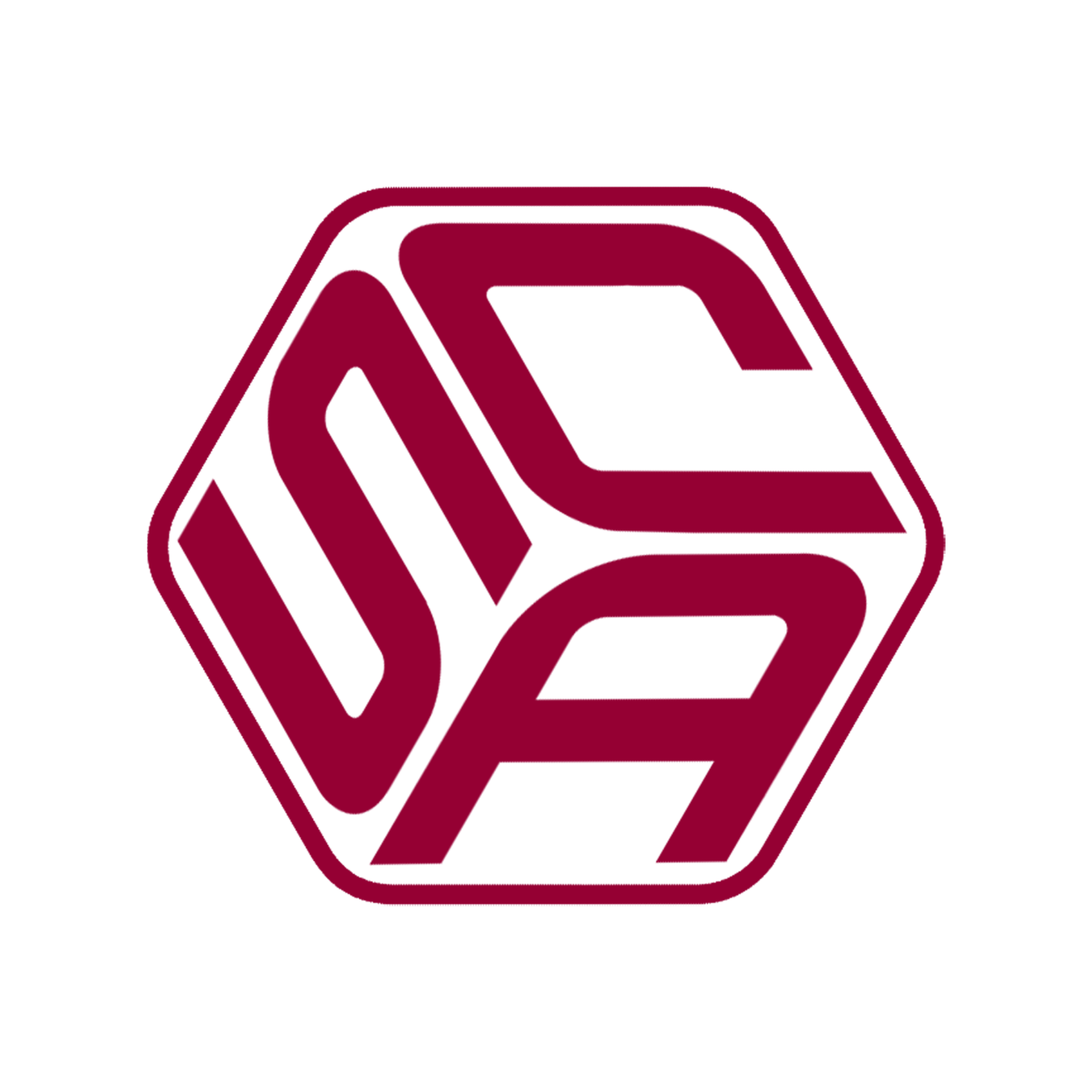
The PUP Student Council Assembly logo features “SCA” in a 3D box, symbolizing unity and solidarity, in deep red for militancy.

The Student Council Assembly (SCA) is the highest decision- and policy-making body of Student Councils at the PUP Manila Campus, undergraduate level. It is composed of the president, vice president, secretary-general, and treasurer of the PUP SKM and presidents of the local student councils of various colleges in the university.

SCA affirms that education is a constitutional right that must be accessible to all and serve as a tool for advancing the Filipino people’s interests and critical consciousness. It recognizes systemic inequities in the current education system and upholds the university’s role in responding to national needs. The Assembly has continuously committed to being progressive, democratic, and militant, actively defending students’ and people’s rights, fostering pro-people leadership, and uniting with marginalized sectors in pursuit of a just and democratic society, guided by its motto, “for the students and the people, we remain.”

The composition of the upcoming SCA Assembly is as follows:

Name	Party	Position	Committee Designation
Manuel A. Villanueva	Sinagtala Coalition	SKM President	Executive Committee
Cherry Jhoana C. Ubani	Sinagtala Coalition	SKM Vice President	Executive Committee
TBD	Sinagtala Coalition or PUP SINTA	SKM Secretary-General	Executive Committee
TBD	Sinagtala Coalition or PUP SINTA	SKM Treasurer	Executive Committee
JC Mendoza (Note: Will assume as President of CADBE because there are no confirmed winners)	SAMASA PUP	CADBE Student Council Vice President	Committee TBD
Justine Pagas	ALAB	CAL Student Council President	Committee TBD
John Reco Faro	SIBOL	CBA Student Council President	Committee TBD
Aidan Jireh Orolfo	SAMASA PUP	CCIS Student Council President	Committee TBD
Hershey Gail Del Mundo (Note: abstentions overtook the CE local elections but will still proclaim as winner)	SAMASA PUP	CE Student Council President	Committee TBD
Perl Be John Lilo-an	SULONG	CHK Student Council President	Committee TBD
Kim Solano	SINAG	COA Student Council President	Committee TBD
Abijah Villagomez	SAMASA PUP	COC Student Council President	Committee TBD
Permarie Lacava	TALA NG BAYAN	COED Student Council President	Committee TBD
Benedict Galang	Sinagtala Coalition	CPSPA Student Council President	Committee TBD
Luisa Pangan	YUGTO	CS Student Council President	Committee TBD
Sharnonn Echevarria Guinto (Note: abstentions overtook the CSSD local elections but will still proclaim as winner)	SAMASA PUP	CSSD Student Council President	Committee TBD
Jasmine Rose Tiria	SAMASA PUP	CTHTM Student Council President	Committee TBD
Mhelo Gepiga	SAMASA PUP	ITech Student Council President	Committee TBD
Rafaellyn Pedeglorio	SAMASA PUP	OUS Student Council President	Committee TBD

The composition of the 17th Assembly is as follows:

Name	Party	Position	Committee Designation
John Paul "JP" Azusano	SAMASA PUP	SKM President	Executive Committee
Tracy Althea Ramos	SAMASA PUP	SKM Vice President	Executive Committee
Michael Dave Bolima	SAMASA PUP	SKM Secretary-General	Head, Committee on Secretariat and Records Management Executive Committee
Suharto Buleg Jr.	SAMASA PUP	SKM Treasurer	Head, Committee on Budget and Appropriations Executive Committee
Adrianne Athea Atender	Independent	CBA Student Council President	Deputy Secretary-General, Committee on Secretariat and Records Management
Manuel Villanueva	SINAG	COA Student Council President	Member, Committee on Budget and Appropriations
Permarie Lacava	TALA	COED Student Council President	Member, Committee on Budget and Appropriations
Alvinson Aligam	SAMASA PUP	COC Student Council President	Head, Committee on Constitutional Review
John Lloyd Antoc	SAMASA PUP	CCIS Student Council	Member, Committee on Constitutional Review
Cherry Jhoana Ubani	Sinagtala Coalition	CPSPA Student Council President	Member, Committee on Constitutional Review
John Ivan Nicolas	SAMASA PUP	ITech Student Council President	Head, Committee on Council Union
Christian Ancheta	Independent	CAL Student Council President	Member, Committee on Council Union
Perl Be John Lilo-an	Independent	CHK Student Council President	Member, Committee on Council Union
Keeth Monce Landicho	SAMASA PUP	CE Student Council President	Head, Committee on Public Relations and Creative Affairs
Janina Agustin	SAMASA PUP	CADBE Student Council President	Member, Committee on Public Relations and Creative Affairs
Luisa Pangan	Independent	CS Student Council President	Member, Committee on Public Relations and Creative Affairs
Danielle Santiago	SAMASA PUP	OUS Student Council President	Head, Committee on Rules
Gio Ba-ay III	Independent	CSSD Student Council President	Member, Committee on Rules
Roman Tongco	SAMASA PUP	CTHTM Student Council President	Member, Committee on Rules

=== PUP Commission on Election ===
PUP Commission on Elections Logo

The Commission on Elections (COMELEC) stands as the highest policy making body of all election matter in PUP Manila.

The composition of the Commission En Banc for A.Y. 2026-2027
Name	Position	Designation	College
Hon. Mark David L. Bartolata	Chairperson	Executive & En Banc	CPSPA
Hon. James Benedict G. Aniciete	Vice Chairperson	Legal & Administrative	CAL
Hon. Sherlyn Fuentes	Secretary-General	Secretariat	CS
Hon. Lucy Joy T. Dalida	Treasurer	Audit & Finance	COA
Hon. Neriah Phoebe M. Bobiles	Director	Publications & Multimedia	CCIS
Hon. Rein Alyssa G. Soriano	Director	Programs & Events	CE
Vacant	Commissioner	N/A	CADBE
Hon. Rachelyn F. Esteva	Commissioner	Programs & Events	CBA
Hon. Colin S. Del Rosario	Commissioner	Programs & Events	COC
Hon. Ken Cedrick Peña Villaluz	Commissioner	Secretariat	CHK
Hon. Mark Rheyneil Hembrador	Commissioner	Executive	COED
Hon. Samantha Fhay Roque	Commissioner	Audit & Finance	CSSD
Vacant	Commissioner	N/A	CTHTM
Hon. Mia Rizzi Lucban	Commissioner	Programs & Events	ITECH
Hon. Czantle G. Domingo	Commissioner	Legal & Administrative	OUS

The structure includes a Chairperson, Vice Chairperson, Secretary-General, Treasurer, Commissioners and Deputy Commissioners from various colleges.

== List of presidents ==
The president of the PUP Sentral na Konseho ng Mag-aaral (SKM) is the chief executive officer and overseer of the PUP Student Council and the presiding officer of the PUP Student Council Assembly (SCA).

Term of Office	Name	Party	College	Remarks	Immediate previous post
1968 to 1969	Mario Santos				
1969 to 1970	Crispin Aranda				
1992 to 1993	Jonathan Batangan	SAMASA PUP			SC-ST Chief Magistrate
1996 to 1997	Froilan Remo	KAISA			
1997 to 1998	Shiela Osmaña	SAMASA PUP			
2004 to 2005	Diana Mond Directo	SAMASA PUP			
2005 to 2006	Henrie Enaje	SAMASA PUP	CAL	Enaje also served as Student Regent from 2005 to 2007.	
2009 to 2010	Donnavie Pascual	SAMASA PUP		Elected as Student Regent in July 2009 and served until 2010.	
2011 to 2012	Fatima Villanueva	SAMASA PUP	CB		
2012 to 2013	Raven Desposado	SAMASA PUP	CSSD		SKM Councilor
2013 to 2014	Charley Urquiza	SAMASA PUP	CSSD	Kilos PUP and Bangon PUP were disqualified by the COMELEC in the 2013 election.	
2014 to 2015	Jessica Ferrera	SAMASA PUP	CBS	Ferrera and SAMASA PUP slate ran unopposed.; She was elected as Student Regent in September 2014.	
2015 to 2016	Alyssa Manalo	SAMASA PUP	CoEd	Kilos PUP merged with PUP SPEAK, with the latter fielding its first slate.	
2016 to 2017	Jonald Bagasina	PUP SPEAK	CPSPA	Bagasina was the first elected president from PUP SPEAK.	
2017 to 2018	Elijah San Fernando	PUP SPEAK	CSSD	Fernando was elected as vice president in 2016, assumed the presidency after Bagasina's graduation.; Elected as Student Regent in September 2017.; Eventually elected as congressman, representing Kamanggagawa.	SKM Vice President
2018 to 2019	Ralyn Rodriguez	PUP SPEAK	CAL		
2019 to 2021	Jonero Dacula	PUP SPEAK	CE	Failure of election was initially declared by COMELEC, which was overturned by the Student Council Assembly.; SCA eventually disqualified SAMASA PUP and its winning standard bearer, Maya Santos.; One-year hold-over term was proclaimed in 2020 by the SCA due to COVID-19 pandemic restrictions.	SKM Councilor
June 2021 - September 2021	Aubrey Garganera (OIC)	PUP SPEAK	CPSPA	Elected Councilor and Secretary-General who served as officer-in-charge from June to September 2021 after Dacula's resignation.	SKM Secretary-General
2021 to 2022	Albiean Revalde	SAMASA PUP	CE	Revalde was the first transgender woman president of PUP SKM. First online elections were held due to COVID-19 pandemic restrictions.	
2022 to 2023	Kirchhoff Thomas Angala	SAMASA PUP	CAF	Angala and SAMASA PUP slate ran unopposed.; First face-to-face election debate held after pandemic. Second online elections held from September 30 to October 4, 2022.	SKM Vice President
2023 to 2024	Kim Modelo	SAMASA PUP	CAL	Open University System students were once again allowed to participate in election.; Modelo and SAMASA PUP slate ran unopposed.; Elected as the first transgender woman Student Regent of the university in December 2023.	SKM Secretary-General
September 2024 - November 2025	Tiffany Faith Brillante	SAMASA PUP	CPSPA	Brillante and SAMASA PUP slate ran unopposed.; The president with the second highest number of votes in the recent PUP SC Election history with 10,040 votes.	CPSPA SC Councilor
November 7, 2025 - October 26, 2026	John Paul Y. Azusano	SAMASA PUP	CCIS	The highest presidential votes in the recent PUP SC Election history with 12,102 votes.; First SKM President hailing from CCIS.; First SKM board with an elected independent councilor since 2021 SC election.; Elected as Student Regent of the university in July 2026. Suspended and later Resigned due to failure to comply with the guidelines of Student Regency.; Shortest-serving Student Regent, having served for only 3 months, 16 days since his election in July.	CCIS SC President
October 26, 2026 - Present	Suharto Buleg (OIC)	SAMASA	CAF	Azusano was found not enrolled during the first semester of AY 2025-2026, while VP Ramos was conferred the baccalaureate degree during the September 2026 commencement exercises, rendering both of their official authorizations not accepted by the University.	SKM Treasurer
November 2026	Manuel A. Villanueva	Sinagtala Coalition	COA (formerly CAF)	Villanueva was the first elected president from the Sinagtala Coalition of Student Leaders.; The SKM slate of SAMASA PUP was disqualified by the COMELEC in 2026.	CAF SC President

== Student representatives ==
=== Board of Regents (Student Regent) ===
The Alyansa ng Nagkakaisang Konseho ng PUP (ANAK-PUP), the federation-alliance of student councils and governments across all PUP campuses nationwide, elects its President, who shall seat as the student sector representative to the Board of Regents, which is the highest policy-making and governing body of the university.

The student sector representative to the Board of Regents is commonly known as the Student Regent.

The current student regent is Alvinson V. Aligam, from the College of Communication, elected in November 10, 2026.

List of PUP Student Regents
No.	Name	College or Campus	Term of office
1	Janice Q. Javier	College of Business Administration (formerly College of Business)	May-December 2002
Vacant from January to March 2003
2	Lire Pilipino B. Maga	College of Business Administration (formerly College of Business)	March 2003 - April 2004
Vacant from April 2004 to March 2005
3	Diana Mond P. Directo	College of Arts and Letters (formerly College of Language and Linguistics)	March 2005 - May 2006
Vacant from May to August 2006
4	Henrie F. Enaje	College of Arts and Letters (formerly College of Arts)	August 2006 - December 2007
Vacant from January to March 2008
5	Ma. Sofia M. Prado	College of Arts and Letters (formerly College of Arts)	March 2008 - April 2009
Vacant from April to September 2009
6	Donnavie M. Pascual	College of Business Administration (formerly College of Business)	September 2009 - May 2010
Vacant from May to September 2010
7	Sheryl P. Alapad	College of Business Administration (formerly College of Business)	September 2010 - March 2011
8	Rommel Teofilo F. Aguilar	College of Science (formerly College of Nutrition and Food Science)	April 2011 - June 2012
Vacant from June to August 2012
9	Helen J. Alfonso	College of Arts and Letters (formerly College of Arts)	August 2012 - December 2013
Vacant from December 2013 to March 2014
10	Ma. Alexi R. Tiotangco	College of Social Sciences and Development	March 2014 - March 2015
Vacant from March to June 2015
11	Jessica B. Ferrera	College of Communication	June-December 2015
Vacant from December 2015 to March 2016
12	Karl Paulie Anareta	College of Accountancy (formerly College of Accountancy and Finance)	March 2016 - June 2017
Vacant from June to September 2017
13	Elijah San Fernando	College of Social Sciences and Development	September 2017 - September 2018
Vacant from September to December 2018
14	Ronilo J. Cervante	PUP Maragondon, Cavite Campus	December 2018 - September 2019
Vacant from September to December 2019
15	Ellenor Joyce G. Bartolome	College of Political Science and Public Administration	December 2019 - March 2021
Vacant from March to June 2021
16	Rommel S. Gonzaga	PUP San Juan Campus	June 2021 - December 2022
17	Wilhelm B. Provido Jr.	College of Computer and Information Sciences	January-December 2023
Vacant from December 2023 to March 2024
18	Kim D. R. Modelo	College of Arts and Letters	March 25, 2024 - April 14, 2025
19	Michael Troy Cabangon	College of Political Science and Public Administration	April 14, 2025 - July 10, 2026
20	John Paul Y. Azusano	College of Computer and Information Sciences	July 10, 2026 - October 26, 2026
20	Vacant from October to November 2026		
20	Alvinson V. Aligam	College of Communication	November 10, 2026 - Present

=== Student Disciplinary Board ===
The SKM President and the Student Regent nominate the student representative to the Student Disciplinary Board, an administrative body responsible for adjudicating serious student violations and handling major complaints or grievance cases outlined in the university's Student Handbook. The student representative is then appointed by the University President through a special order.

List of Student Representatives to the Student Disciplinary Board
Name	College or Campus	Year appointed
Patrick F. Puchero	College of Political Science and Public Administration	2021
Rafaelo T. Panghulan	College of Political Science and Public Administration	2021
Ramon Christopher H. Raquion	PUP Maragondon Campus	2024
Omega "Jia" Navas	College of Business Administration	2024
Jeous Daniel Bulawan	PUP Parañaque Campus	2026
Neilvin John P. Aventurado	College of Communication	2026

=== Committee on Decorum and Investigation ===
The SKM President and the Student Regent nominate the student representative to the Committee on Decorum and Investigation. The student representative is then appointed by the University President through a special order.

List of Student Representatives to the Committee on Decorum and Investigation
Name	College or Campus	Year appointed
Marvilyn T. Medrano	College of Communication	2021
Whenzy G. Jumapao	PUP Taguig Campus	2024
Wellyssa E. Torne	College of Political Science and Public Administration	2026
