= Polytechnic University of the Philippines Sablayan =

Public university in Occidental Mindoro, Philippines

Polytechnic University of the Philippines Sablayan Campus
- Politeknikong Unibersidad ng Pilipinas, Kampus ng Sablayan (Filipino)
- Motto: Tanglaw ng Bayan
- Type: State University, Public University
- Established: 2010
- Director: Dir. Lorenza Elena S. Gimutao
- Location: Sablayan, Occidental Mindoro, Philippines; 12°50′50″N 120°47′07″E
- University hymn: Imno ng PUP
- Colors: Maroon and Gold
- Website: www.pup.edu.ph
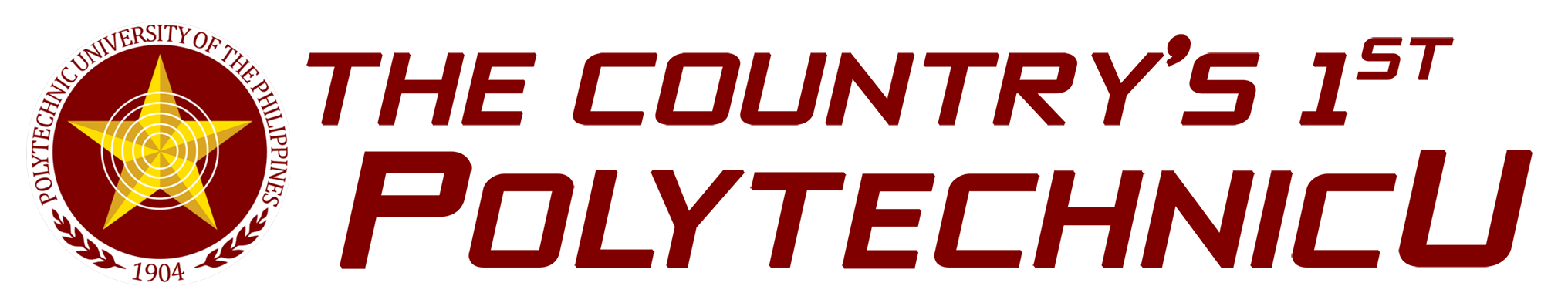

- Location in the Luzon Location in the Philippines

Polytechnic University of the Philippines, Sablayan Campus or PUP Sablayan (Filipino: Politeknikong Unibersidad ng Pilipinas, Sablayan) is the 21st PUP campus located in Sitio Macambang, Brgy. Buenavista, municipality of Sablayan, Occidental Mindoro, Philippines. It is an LGU-funded campus.

The campus was created through a Memorandum of Agreement (MOA) between the university and the Municipal Government of Sablayan on October 6, 2010.

== Academics ==
College of Cooperatives (CC)

- Bachelor in Cooperative

College of Tourism, Hospitality and Transportation Management (CTHTM)

- Associate in Tourism Management

Open University

- Master in Public Administration
- Master in Educational Management
