= Polytechnic University of the Philippines Bansud =

Public university in Oriental Mindoro, Philippines

Polytechnic University of the Philippines Bansud Campus
- Politeknikong Unibersidad ng Pilipinas sa Bansud (Filipino)
- Motto: Tanglaw ng Bayan
- Type: State University, Public University
- Established: 2010
- Location: Bansud, Oriental Mindoro, Philippines; 12°51′44″N 121°27′26″E
- University hymn: Imno ng PUP
- Colors: Maroon and Gold
- Website: www.pup.edu.ph
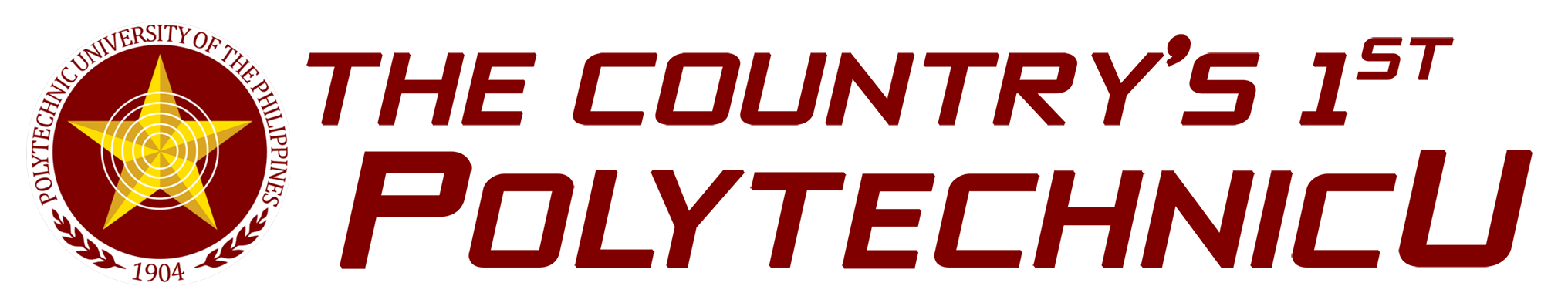

- Location in the Luzon Location in the Philippines

Polytechnic University of the Philippines, Bansud Campus or PUP Bansud (Filipino: Politeknikong Unibersidad ng Pilipinas, Bansud) is PUP campus located in the municipality of Bansud, Oriental Mindoro, Philippines

The campus was created through a Memorandum of Agreement (MOA) between the University and the Municipal Government of Bansud.

== Academics ==
College of Computer Management and Information Technology

- Bachelor of Science in Information Technology

College of Education

- Bachelor in Secondary Education

College of Technology

- Diploma in Office Management Technology
