= Polytechnic University of the Philippines Lopez =

Public university in Quezon, Philippines

- Politeknikong Unibersidad ng Pilipinas Lopez (Filipino)
- Motto: Tanglaw ng Bayan
- Motto in English: Light of the Nation
- Type: Satellite campus of the Polytechnic University of the Philippines
- Established: 1979
- Affiliations: Accrediting Agency of Chartered Colleges and Universities in the Philippines (AACCUP)
- President: Manuel Muhi
- Director: Ronaldo G. Bulfa
- Location: Yumul st. Brgy. Burgos, Lopez, Quezon, Philippines; 13°52′51″N 122°15′36″E
- University hymn: Imno ng PUP
- Colors: Maroon and Gold
- Mascot: Pylon
- Website: www.pup.edu.ph
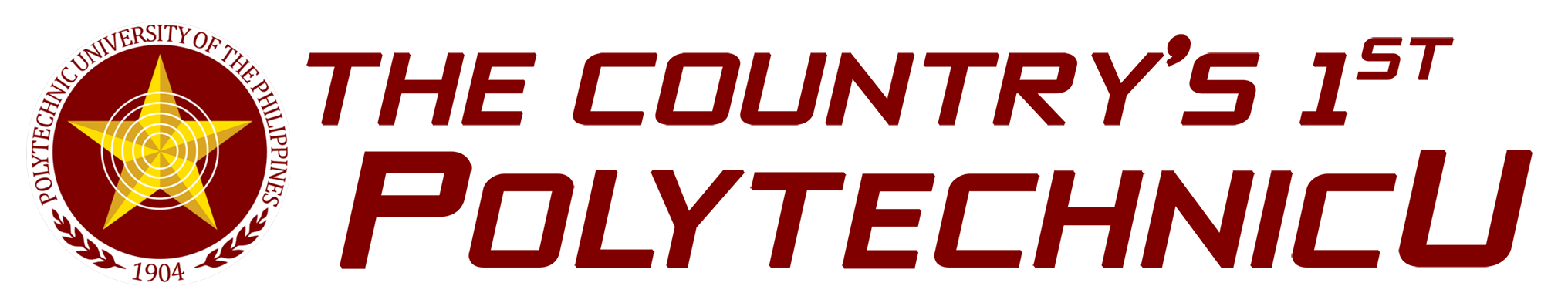

- Location in Luzon Location in the Philippines

The Polytechnic University of the Philippines, Lopez Branch also known as PUP-LQ (Filipino: Politeknikong Unibersidad ng Pilipinas, Sangay sa Lopez) is one of the four (4) satellite campuses of the Polytechnic University of the Philippines in Quezon province.

== Undergraduate programs ==
The branch offers sixteen (16) undergraduate programs and six (6) diploma programs as follows:

College of Accountancy (COA)

- Bachelor of Science in Accountancy (BSA)

College of Business (CB)

- Bachelor of Science in Agri-business Management (BSAM)
- Bachelor of Science in Business Administration Major in Financial Management (BSBA-FM)
- Bachelor of Science in Business Administration Major in Marketing Management (BSBA-MM)

College of Education (COED)

- Bachelor in Elementary Education (BEED)
- Bachelor in Secondary Education Major in Mathematics (BSED-MT)

College of Engineering and Architecture (CEA)

- Bachelor of Science in Architecture (BSARCHI)
- Bachelor of Science in Civil Engineering (BSCE)
- Bachelor of Science in Electrical Engineering (BSEE)

College of Tourism and Hotel and Restaurant Management (CTHRM)

- Bachelor of Science in Hospitality Management (BSHM)

College of Public Administration (COPA)

- Bachelor in Public Administration (BPA)
- Bachelor in Public Administration Major in Fiscal Administration (BPA-FA)
- Bachelor of Science in Office Administration Major in Legal Office Administration (BSOA-LOA)

College of Technology (CT)

- Bachelor of Science in Information Technology (BSIT)
- Diploma in Civil Engineering Technology (DCVET)
- Diploma in Electrical Engineering Technology (DEET)
- Diploma in Information Technology (DIT)
- Diploma in Office Management and Technology (DOMT)
  - Major in Legal Office Management (DOMT-LOM)
  - Major in Medical Office Management (DOMT-MOM)
- Diploma in Computer Engineering Technology (DCPET)

College of Allied Sciences (CAS)

- Bachelor of Science in Biology (BSBIO)
- Bachelor of Science in Nutrition and Dietetics (BSND)
