= University of the Philippines (disambiguation) =

The University of the Philippines is the national university system of the Philippines. "University of the Philippines" also refers to its individual universities:

== Universities under the University of the Philippines system ==
- University of the Philippines Baguio
- University of the Philippines Cebu
- University of the Philippines Diliman in Quezon City
- University of the Philippines Los Baños
- University of the Philippines Manila
- University of the Philippines Mindanao in Davao City
- University of the Philippines Open University in Los Baños
- University of the Philippines Visayas in Miagao

=== Affiliated secondary schools ===
- University of the Philippines High School Cebu
- University of the Philippines High School in Iloilo
- University of the Philippines Integrated School
- University of the Philippines Rural High School

== Other unrelated universities ==
- Adventist University of the Philippines, a private Christian university
- Polytechnic University of the Philippines, a public university
- Technological University of the Philippines, a public university
- University of Santo Tomas, officially the "Pontifical and Royal University of Santo Tomas, the Catholic University of the Philippines"
