= Polytechnic University of the Philippines Calauan =

Public university in Laguna, Philippines

Polytechnic University of the Philippines Calauan Campus
- Politeknikong Unibersidad ng Pilipinas sa Calauan (Filipino)
- Motto: Tanglaw ng Bayan
- Type: State University, Public University
- Established: 2009
- Director: Dir. Arlene R. Queri
- Location: Calauan, Laguna, Philippines; 14°08′54″N 121°18′43″E
- University hymn: Imno ng PUP
- Colors: Maroon and Yellow
- Website: www.pup.edu.ph
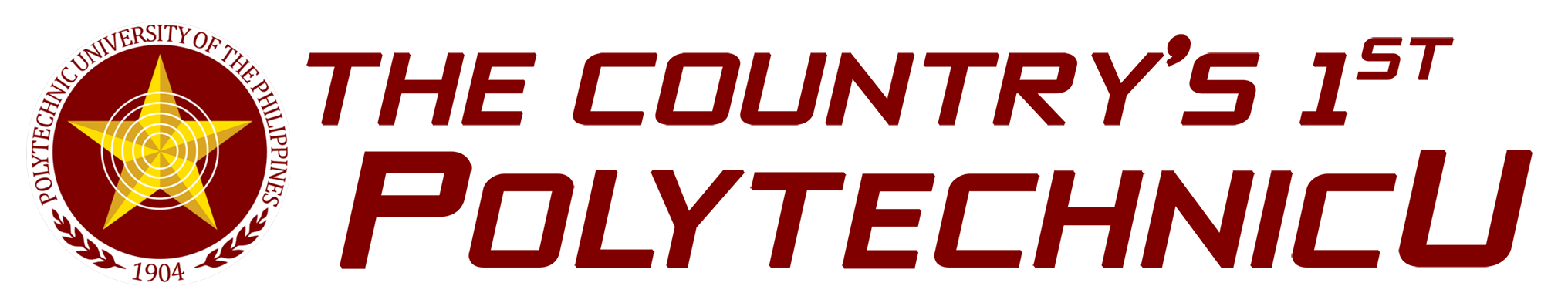

- Location in Laguna Location in Luzon Location in the Philippines

Polytechnic University of the Philippines, Calauan Laguna Campus or PUP Calauan (Filipino: Politeknikong Unibersidad ng Pilipinas, sa Calauan) is a PUP campus located in the municipality of Calauan, Laguna province, Philippines, offering two courses, one diploma program and undergraduate programs.

The 18th provincial campus of the university, PUP Calauan, was established in June 2009 as a result of an agreement between PUP President Dante G. Guevarra and former Calauan Mayor Buenafrido T. Berris.

Under the agreement, the municipality of Calauan will provide the necessary requirements like schoolrooms, school equipment and facilities, and management of operations of the campus while PUP will supply the instructors/professors and curriculum.

== Courses ==
College of Business (CB)

- Bachelor of Science in Entrepreneurial Management (BSEM)

College of Education (COED)

- Bachelor of Business Teacher Education (BBTE)

College of Computer and Information Sciences (CCIS)

- Bachelor of Science in Information Technology (BSIT)
