= Polytechnic University of the Philippines Santa Rosa =

Public university in Laguna, Philippines

Polytechnic University of the Philippines Santa Rosa Campus
- Politeknikong Unibersidad ng Pilipinas, Sudlong ng Santa Rosa (Filipino)
- Motto: Tanglaw ng Bayan
- Type: State University, Public University
- Established: 2003
- Director: Dir. Leny V. Salmingo Fmr. Dir. Marisa R. Baybay Fmr. Dir. Charito A. Montemayor
- Location: Santa Rosa, Laguna, Philippines; 14°18′49″N 121°06′24″E
- University hymn: Imno ng PUP
- Colors: Maroon and Gold
- Website: pupsrc102.school.blog
- Location in Laguna Location in Luzon Location in the Philippines

The Polytechnic University of the Philippines, Santa Rosa Campus or PUP-SRC (Filipino: Politeknikong Unibersidad ng Pilipinas, Lungsod ng Santa Rosa) is one of the two extension campuses of the university system in Laguna, Philippines. It is located in the Kanluran, Santa Rosa, Laguna, and was established in 2016.

== Location ==
PUP Santa Rosa

Polytechnic University of the Philippines - Sta. Rosa Campus (PUP-SRC) is currently located at Tiongco Subd., Brgy. Tagapo, Santa Rosa City, Laguna.
