= Emanuel de Guzman =

12th President of the Polytechnic University of the Philippines

Emanuel C. De Guzman
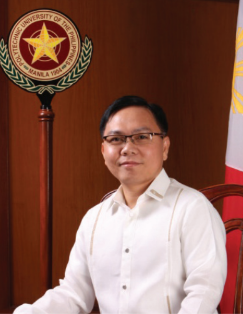

Vice President for Academic Affairs of the Polytechnic University of the Philippines
- Incumbent
- Assumed office 2020
- Preceded by: Manuel M. Muhi, D.Tech

12th President of the Polytechnic University of the Philippines
- In office March 15, 2012 – March 17, 2020
- Preceded by: Estelita Wi-Dela Rosa, Ll.B.
- Succeeded by: Manuel M. Muhi, D.Tech

Personal details
- Born: April 27, 1965 (age 61) Cabanatuan, Nueva Ecija
- Spouse: May F. De Guzman (m. 1989)
- Children: 3
- Education: Polytechnic University of the Philippines (1993); Ateneo de Manila University (2001); University of Manchester (2008)
- Profession: Sociologist; Educator
- Website: http://pup.edu.ph

Emanuel "Dekong" Castro De Guzman is a former President of the Polytechnic University of the Philippines. De Guzman was appointed by the Commission on Higher Education in accordance with the provisions of the Republic Act 8292, otherwise known as the Higher Education Modernization Act of 1997. and by virtue of Resolution No. 872, Series of 2012 passed on March 14, 2012, by the PUP Board of Regents. De Guzman is the second youngest President next to Dr. Nemesio Prudente.

== Biography ==
=== Early years and education ===
Born to Rosalina and Jacinto De Guzman, De Guzman graduated in High School as Class Valedictorian in Quezon, Nueva Ecija, he then took up Bachelor of Science in Sociology at Polytechnic University of the Philippines in 1993 and earned his Master of Arts in Sociology at Ateneo de Manila University in 2001. He earned his Ph.D. in Sociology at the School of Social Sciences, The University of Manchester in 2008.

=== Academe ===
Before being elected as Polytechnic University of the Philippines' President, De Guzman was the Director of the Center for Human Development and the Chairperson of the Department of Sociology and Anthropology. De Guzman served two consecutive terms as the President of the Polytechnic University of the Philippines from 2012 to 2020. He was succeeded by Dr. Manuel Muhi on 17 March 2020.

As a Ford Foundation International Fellow, De Guzman underwent a comprehensive Leadership Course at the Ford Foundation International Institute for Leadership and Social Justice, University of Birmingham. He also took up the special training course on Sociological imagination at Coventry University in England.

Academic offices
Preceded by Estelita Wi-Dela Rosa	President of the Polytechnic University of the Philippines; 2012–2020	Succeeded by Manuel Muhi
