= President of the Polytechnic University of the Philippines =

Principal executive officer of the Polytechnic University of the Philippines

- Pangulo ng Politeknikong Unibersidad ng Pilipinas
- University Seal

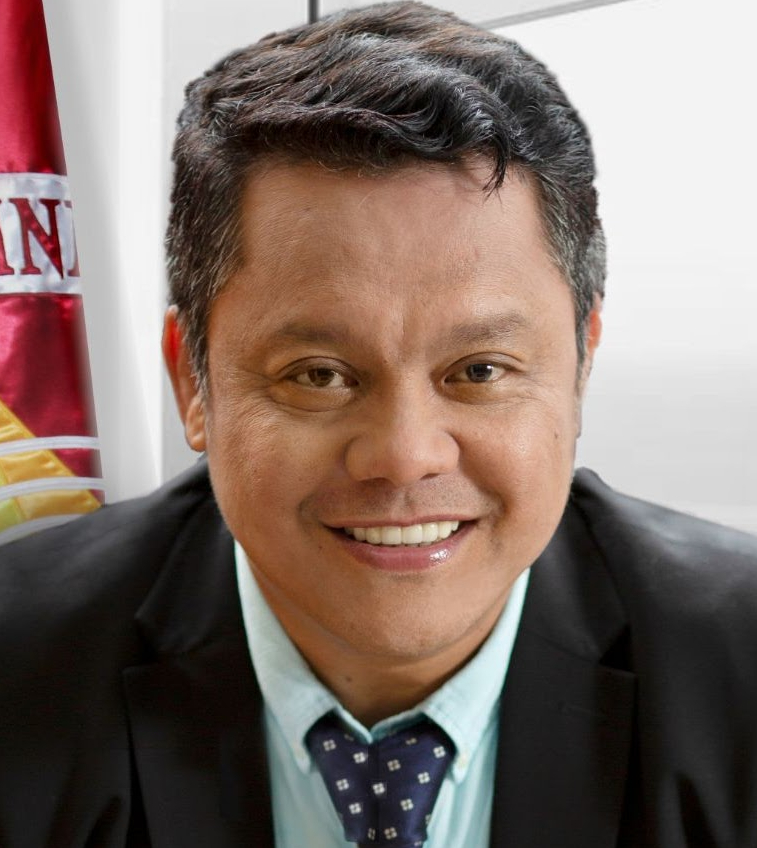
- Incumbent; Manuel Muhi since March 17, 2020
- Style: Mr. President (formal)
- Status: Principal Executive Officer
- Member of: Board of Regents
- Seat: Manila
- Appointer: Board of Regents
- Term length: Four years, up to two terms
- Constituting instrument: Republic Act No. 8292
- Formation: March 1978 (official)
- First holder: Pablo T. Mateo
- Salary: ₱4,800,000 annually
- Website: Official Website

The president of the Polytechnic University of the Philippines (Filipino: Pangulo ng Politeknikong Unibersidad ng Pilipinas) is the principal executive officer of the Polytechnic University of the Philippines. The president oversees the policy implementation, guide the institution towards the realization of its vision-mission, as well as monitor and administer the overall affairs of the university, and is the vice-chairman of its Board of Regents. Republic Act No. 8292, formed in 1996, establishes the powers, and appointment of the President of the Polytechnic University of the Philippines.

Manuel Muhi, is the 13th and current president of the Polytechnic University of the Philippines. He assumed office on March 17, 2020 and officially sworn as president on October 1, 2021 due to prompt declaration of enhanced community quarantine lockdown in Luzon.

== List of past presidents ==
Manila Business School (MBS) Philippine School of Commerce (PSC) Superintendents and School Principals
Name	Tenure of office
Gabriel A. O'Reilly	1904-1911
John D. DeHuff	1911-1913
Ralph H. Wardall	1913-1914
Walter William Marquardt	1914-1915
Luther B. Bewly	1915-1916
Charles H. Storms	1916-1917
E.J. Deymek	1917-1918
Stanley P. Johnson	1918-1919
Charles T. Dodrill	1919-1920
Ms. Belle Murphy	1920-1933
Luis F. Reyes	1946-1952

Philippine College of Commerce (PCC) Presidents
Name	Tenure of office
Luis F. Reyes	1952–1956
Pacifico A. Velilla	1956–1960
Victor dela Torre	1960–1962
Nemesio E. Prudente	1962–1972
Narciso Albaraccin, Jr.	1972–1973
Isabelo T. Crisostomo	1973–1977
Pablo T. Mateo	1977–1978

Polytechnic University of the Philippines (PUP) University Presidents
Name	Tenure of office
Pablo T. Mateo	1978–1986
Nemesio E. Prudente	1986–1991
Zenaida A. Olonan	1991–1992
Jaime Gellor	1992
Zenaida A. Olonan	1992–1999
Ofelia M. Carague	1999–2003
Samuel M. Salvador	2003-2005
Dante G. Guevarra	2005-2011
Estelita Wi-Dela Rosa	2011-2012
Emanuel C. de Guzman	2012-2020
Manuel M. Muhi	2020–Present

Notes
Names in italics serves as acting presidents or officer-in-charge

== See also ==
- Polytechnic University of the Philippines
