= Manuel Muhi =

13th President of the Polytechnic University of the Philippines

Manuel M. Muhi
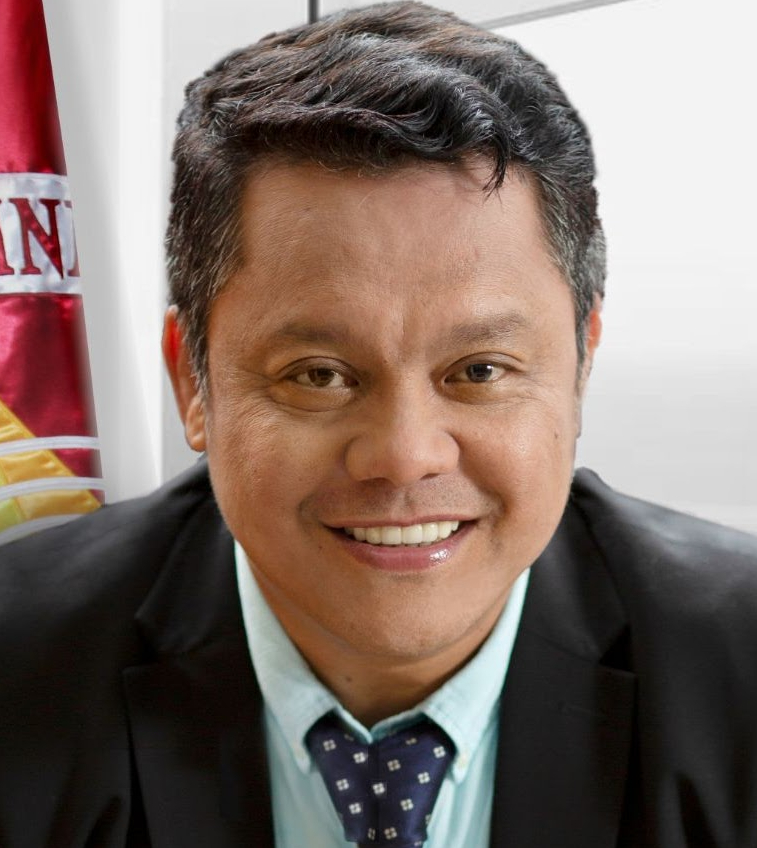

13th President of the Polytechnic University of the Philippines
- Incumbent
- Assumed office February 7, 2020
- Preceded by: Emanuel de Guzman

Vice President for Academic Affairs of the Polytechnic University of the Philippines
- Succeeded by: Emanuel de Guzman

Personal details
- Born: Manuel Mengorio Muhi; December 19, 1966 (age 59) Boac, Marinduque, Philippines
- Spouse: Pamela Grace C. Muhi
- Children: Manuel Miguel Lenin "Migzy" Muhi; Lorenzo Muhi
- Education: Polytechnic University of the Philippines (BS); Delft University of Technology (MTech); Technological University of the Philippines (DTech); Development Academy of the Philippines (DEL)
- Occupation: President
- Profession: Civil engineer Educator

Manuel "Bong" M. Muhi (born December 22, 1966) is a Filipino civil engineer and educator who is the incumbent President of the Polytechnic University of the Philippines. He was appointed by the university Board of Regents in accordance with the provisions of the Republic Act 8292, otherwise known as the Higher Education Modernization Act of 1997.

== Biography ==
=== Early years and education ===
Manuel Muhi graduated in Polytechnic University of the Philippines in 1988 and became licensed Civil engineer on succeeding year, he acquired Masters in Transportation and Road Engineering from the International Institute for Infrastructural with a concentration in Transportation Engineering, Hydraulics and Environmental Engineering in Technological University of Delft (2000), The Netherlands. Later on he entered in Research Scientist Exchange Program of the Tokyo Institute of Technology from June to September 2001 afterwards he acquired a Doctoral degree in Technology from Technological University of the Philippines in 2008.

Muhi was awarded with Executive Doctorate in Education Leadership by the Development Academy of the Philippines. His expertise are widely acknowledge in Philippines and International; also registered ASEAN Engineer. He is also Fellow of the Royal Institute of Engineers in Singapore, an Advisory Council member of Philippine National Police . Published several research papers, articles and technical developments through a range of papers and conferences One of them is "Rail Transit Accessibility of Metro Manila" for the Japan Society for the Promotion of Science - DOST International Symposium on Environmental Engineering and the 5th Regional Symposium on Infrastructure Development in Civil Engineering; another is "Effects of Temperature Changes in Steel Box Girder Bridge" for the Japan Society for the Promotion of Science, Bulletin on Environmental Engineering; and a third is "Evaluation of Urban Road Carbon Monoxide Dispersion" as part of the Technical Proceedings of the 5th International Conference in Civil Engineering.

=== Academe ===
From 1996 to 2004, Muhi presided over PUP's Department of Civil Engineering. From 2006 until 2012, he served as the College of Engineering's Dean. From 2012 to 2015, he was the PUP's Vice President for Research, Extension, Planning, and Development. He has been the Vice President for Academic Affairs at PUP since December 2015, and from 2018 to 2019, he also held the position of Executive Vice President.
