= Amparo and habeas data in the Philippines =

Prerogative writs in the legal system

In the Philippines, amparo and habeas data are prerogative writs to supplement the inefficacy of the writ of habeas corpus (Rule 102, Revised Rules of Court). Amparo means 'protection,' while habeas data is 'access to information.' Both writs were conceived to solve the extensive Philippine extrajudicial killings and forced disappearances since 1999.

On July 16, 2007, Philippine Chief Justice Reynato Puno and Justice Adolfo Azcuna officially declared the legal conception of the Philippine Writ of Amparo ("Recurso de Amparo"), at the historic Manila Hotel National Summit on Extrajudicial Killings and Enforced Disappearances.

On August 25, 2007, Reynato Puno declared the legal conception of amparo's twin, the supplemental Philippine Habeas Data. Puno by judicial fiat proclaimed the legal birth of these twin peremptory writs in October 2007, as his legacy to the Filipino nation. Puno admitted the inefficacy of Habeas Corpus, under Rule 102, Rules of Court, since government officers repeatedly failed to produce the body upon mere submission of the defense of alibi.

By invoking the truth, Habeas Data will not only compel military and government agents to release information about the desaparecidos but require access to military and police files. Reynato Puno's writ of amparo—Spanish for 'protection'—will bar military officers in judicial proceedings to issue denial answers regarding petitions on disappearances or extrajudicial executions, which were legally permitted in Habeas corpus proceedings.

The Supreme Court of the Philippines announced that the draft guidelines (Committee on Revision of Rules) for the writ of amparo were approved on September 23, to be deliberated by the En Banc Court on September 25.

== Origin ==
=== Mexican amparo ===
Chief Justice Reynato Puno noted that the model for amparo was borrowed from Mexico: the right of amparo is a Mexican legal procedure to protect human rights. Of Mexican origin, thus, "amparo" literally means "protection" in Spanish. de Tocqueville's "Democracy in America" had been available in Mexico, in 1837 and its description of judicial review practice in the U.S. appealed to many Mexican jurists. Mexican justice Manuel Crescencio Rejón, drafted a constitutional provision for his native state, Yucatan, which empowered jurists to protect all persons in the enjoyment of their constitutional and legal rights. This was incorporated into the 1847 national constitution. The great right proliferated in the Western Hemisphere, slowly evolving into various fora. Amparo became, in the words of a Mexican Federal Supreme Court Justice, Mexico's "task of conveying to the world’s legal heritage that institution which, as a shield of human dignity, her own painful history conceived."

Amparo's evolution and metamorphosis had been witnessed, for several purposes: "(1) amparo libertad for the protection of personal freedom, equivalent to the habeas corpus right; (2) amparo contra leyes for the judicial review of the constitutionality of statutes; (3) amparo casación for the judicial review of the constitutionality and legality of ac judicial decisión; (4) amparo administrativo for the judicial review of administrative actions; and (5) amparo agrario for the protection of peasants' rights derived from the agrarian reform process."

Latin American countries, except Cuba, used the great right to protect against human rights abuses especially committed in countries under military juntas, adopting an all-encompassing amparo, even to protect socio-economic rights. But other countries like Colombia, Chile, Germany and Spain, opted to limit amparo shield only to some constitutional guarantees or fundamental rights. In the Philippines, while the 1987 Constitution of the Philippines failed to expressly provide for amparo, several amparo protections are already guaranteed, thus: by paragraph 2, Article VIII, Section 1, the "Grave Abuse Clause" - which grants a similar general protection to human rights extended by the amparo contra leyes, amparo casacion, and amparo administrativo. Amparo libertad is similar to habeas corpus in the 1987 Constitution. The Clause is borrowed from the U.S. common law tradition of judicial review (1803 case of Marbury v. Madison).

Justice Adolfo Azcuna, a member of two Constitutional Commissions of 1971, and 1986 previously made a study on the Right amparo as published in the Ateneo Law Journal (see Adolfo S. Azcuna, The Right of Amparo: A Remedy to Enforce Fundamental Rights, 37 ATENEO L.J. 15 (1993).).

The "recurso de amparo" is an exhaustive remedy which originated from Latin America's Mexican, Chilean and Argentinian legal systems, inter alia. Mexico's amparo is found in Articles 103 and 107 of the Mexican Constitution -- the judicial review of governmental action, to empower state courts to protect individuals against state abuses. Amparo was sub-divided into 5 legal departments:

(a) the Liberty Amparo (amparo de libertad);
(b) the Constitutionality Amparo (amparo contra leyes);
(c) the Judicial or "Cassation" Amparo, aimed at the constitutionality of a judicial interpretation;
(d) the Administrative Amparo (amparo como contencioso-administrativo); and
(e) the Agrarian Amparo (amparo en matera agraria, ejidal y comunal).

=== Argentine amparo ===
Amparo was also legally enshrined in Latin America legal systems. It is now an extraordinary legal remedy in Bolivia, Chile, Costa Rica, Ecuador, El Salvador, Guatemala, Honduras, Nicaragua, Panama, Paraguay Peru, Brazil and Argentina. Amparo in Argentina is a limited, summary, emergency procedure, and merely supplementary, requiring previous exhaustion of administrative remedies before rendition of judgment of mandamus or injunction. The decision bars monetary awards and penal provisions except contempt or declaration of unconstitutionality.

=== Habeas corpus ===
Historically, Philippine Habeas Corpus (from 1901 until the present) failed to provide an efficacious legal remedy to victims of extrajudicial killings and desaparecidos. The amparo de libertad transcends the protection of habeas corpus. Once a lawsuit is filed under Habeas Corpus, Rule 102, Rules of Court, the defendants, government officers would merely submit the usual defense of alibi or non-custody of the body sought to be produced. The 1987 Philippine constitution, however, empowers the Supreme Court of the Philippines to promulgate amparo and habeas data, as part of the Rules of Court expressly: “Promulgate rules concerning the protection and enforcement of constitutional rights.” (Sec. 5, (5), Article VIII, 1987, Constitution)

The writ of habeas corpus is an "extraordinary", "common law", or "prerogative writ", which were historically issued by English courts in the name of the monarch to control inferior courts and public authorities within the kingdom. The most common of the other such prerogative writs are quo warranto, prohibito, mandamus, procedendo, and certiorari. The due process for such petitions is not simply civil or criminal, because they incorporate the presumption of non-authority, so that the official who is the respondent has the burden to prove his authority to do or not do something, failing which the court has no discretion but to decide for the petitioner, who may be any person, not just an interested party.

== National Summit on Extrajudicial Killings and Enforced Disappearances ==
On July 16, 2007, Justices, activists, militant leaders, police officials, politicians and prelates attended the Supreme Court of the Philippines's 2-day summit at the Manila Hotel, Metro Manila to solve extrajudicial killings. Chief Justice Reynato Puno stated that the "National Consultative Summit on Extrajudicial Killings and Forced Disappearances: Searching for Solutions" would help stop the murders. Based on CBCP - Bishop Deogracias Yniguez-church's count, the number of victims of extrajudicial killings was record at 778, while survivors of "political assassinations" was 370; 203 "massacre" victims; 186 desaparecido; 502 tortured, and those illegally arrested.

Puno requested for truce and talks with insurgents: "Let us rather engage in the conspiracy of hope…and hope for peace." Puno forwarded the summit's recommendation to President Gloria Macapagal Arroyo, the Senate and the House of Representatives.

“Extralegal killings” (UN instruments term) are those committed without due process of law, which include summary and arbitrary executions, “salvagings”, threats to take the life of journalists, inter alia. “Enforced disappearances” (defined by Declaration on the Protection of All Persons from Enforced Disappearances), include: arrest, detention or abduction by a government official or organized groups under the government; the refusal of the State to disclose the fate or whereabouts of missing persons, inter alia.

== Writs of amparo and habeas data ==
On August 17, 2007, Puno said that the writ of amparo, would bar the military plea of denial (at a speech at the Volunteers Against Crime and Corruption's 9th anniversary, Camp Crame). Under the writ, plaintiffs or victims will have the right of access to information on their lawsuits—a constitutional right called the "habeas data" derived from constitutions of Latin America. The final draft of these twin writs (retroactive) will be promulgated on October. Puno tersely summed the writs "In other words, if you have this right, it would be very, very difficult for State agents, State authorities to be able to escape from their culpability."

Puno stated that with the writ of Habeas corpus, the writs of Habeas Data and writ of amparo will further assist "those looking for missing loved ones". On August 30, 2007, Puno (through his speech at Silliman University in Dumaguete) promised to institute the writ of habeas data (“you should have the idea” or “you should have the data”). Puno explained that amparo bars alibi, while Habeas Data "can find out what information is held by the officer, rectify or even the destroy erroneous data gathered". Brazil used the writ, followed by Colombia, Paraguay, Peru, Argentina, and Ecuador.

The Philippine 1987 Constitution was derived from the 1973 Ferdinand Marcos Constitution, its 1981 amendment, from the 1935 constitution, and from the United States Constitution. The United States Constitution was adopted in its original form on September 17, 1787, by the Constitutional Convention in Philadelphia, Pennsylvania, and later ratified by conventions in each state in the name of "the People." The U.S. Constitution is the oldest written national constitution except possibly for San Marino 's Statutes of 1600, whose status as a true constitution is disputed by scholars. The Writ of Amparo is a remedy to enforce fundamental rights. “among the different procedures that have been established for the protection of human rights, the primary ones that provide direct and immediate protection are habeas corpus and amparo. The difference between these two writs is that habeas corpus is designed to enforce the right to freedom of the person, whereas amparo is designed to protect those other fundamental human rights enshrined in the Constitution but not covered by the writ of habeas corpus.”

The literal translation from Latin of Habeas Data is “you should have the data”. Habeas Data is a constitutional right to protect, per lawsuit filed in court, to protect the image, privacy, honour, information self-determination and freedom of information of a person. Habeas Data can used to discover what information is held about his or her person (via rectification or destruction of the personal data held. Habeas Data originated, inter alia, from the Council of Europe's 108th Convention on Data Protection of 1981 (aimed at protecting the privacy of the individual regarding the automated processing of personal data; with right to access their personal data held in an automated database.

=== Historical promulgations of amparo and habeas data ===
==== A.M. No. 07-9-12-SC, the Rule on the Writ of Amparo ====
On September 25, 2007, Chief Justice Reynato Puno officially announced the approval or promulgation of the Writ of Amparo: "Today, the Supreme Court promulgated the rule that will place the constitutional right to life, liberty and security above violation and threats of violation. This rule will provide the victims of extralegal killings and enforced disappearances the protection they need and the promise of vindication for their rights. This rule empowers our courts to issue reliefs that may be granted through judicial orders of protection, production, inspection and other relief to safeguard one's life and liberty The writ of amparo shall hold public authorities, those who took their oath to defend the constitution and enforce our laws, to a high standard of official conduct and hold them accountable to our people. The sovereign Filipino people should be assured that if their right to life and liberty is threatened or violated, they will find vindication in our courts of justice."[36]

==== AM No. 08-1-16-SC, the Rule on the Writ of Habeas Data ====
On January 22, 2008, the Supreme Court en banc approved the rules for the writ of Habeas Data ("to protect a person’s right to privacy and allow a person to control any information concerning them"), effective on February 2, the Philippines’ Constitution Day. Reynato Puno traced the history of Habeas Data "to the Council of Europe’s 108th Convention on Data Protection of 1981; Brazil was the first Latin American country to adopt the Writ of Habeas Data in 1988 and was strengthened by its National Congress in 1997; in 1991, Colombia incorporated Habeas Data in its Constitution; Paraguay followed in 1992, Peru in 1993, Argentina in 1994, and Ecuador in 1996." In Argentina, Habeas Data allowed "access to police and military records otherwise closed to them."

The Resolution and the Rule on the Writ of Amparo gave legal birth to Puno's brainchild. No filing or legal fee is required for amparo which takes effect on October 24 in time for the 62nd anniversary of the United Nations. Puno also stated that the court will soon issue rules on the writ of Habeas Data and the implementing guidelines for Habeas Corpus. The petition for the writ of amparo may be filed "on any day and at any time" with the Regional Trial Court, or with the Sandiganbayan, the Court of Appeals, and the Supreme Court. The interim reliefs under amparo are: temporary protection order (TPO), inspection order (IO), production order (PO), and witness protection order (WPO, RA 6981).

== Events ==
- On September 26, 2007, human rights lawyer Jose Manuel Diokno of the Free Legal Assistance Group (FLAG) stated that the writ of amparo can be invoked by journalists in stories censored by the government concerning the anti-terrorism law (Human Security Act). Diokno, in a workshop sponsored by the Philippine Center for Investigative Journalism in Baguio added that journalists, in the petition, can submit the censored story as annex, and it becomes a public document that can be used for publication.
- On October 23, 2007, FLAG issued a (a 47-question-and-answer format) primer on the writ of amparo. On October 24, 2007, in a first test case, Merlinda Cadapan and Concepcion Empeno, mothers of two missing Philippine students, filed the first petition for writ of amparo with the Supreme Court of the Philippines to direct the military to let them search army offices for their daughters. The Court later amended the Rules by providing specifics on the period to file the return.
- On December 3, 2007, Reynato S. Puno stated that the writ released only three victims (including Luisito Bustamante, Davao City), since amparo was enforced on October 24: "I would like to think that after the enactment and effectivity (of the writ), the number of extrajudicial killings and disappearances have gone down."
- In January 2008, ABS-CBN news personnel filed the writ of amparo petition with the Supreme Court, which accordingly ordered the government to comment on the petition for protection from harassment and threats of arrest.
- In February 2008, the Supreme Court of the Philippines issued a writ of amparo against President Gloria Macapagal Arroyo and several other government and security officials, granting the petition filed by relatives of the key witness in the Senate investigation of the national broadband network (NBN) controversy.
- On March 11, 2008, the Supreme Court of the Philippines issued the first writ of amparo for a journalist. The Supreme Court issued the writ on behalf of publisher Nilo Baculo Sr. of the community newsletter Traveler’s News in Calapan city, Oriental Mindoro. Baculo filed an application for the writ when he learned of a plan to kill him, allegedly by people whose wrongdoing he had exposed.
- In January 2017, the Center for International Law (CenterLaw) petitioned for a writ of amparo on behalf of families of victims of the drug war of the government of the Philippines. In October 2017, FLAG, on behalf of another set of victims of the drug war, filed for writs of amparo, injunction, and prohibition, as well as for a temporary protection order and temporary restraining order, before the Supreme Court of the Philippines. The Supreme Court granted the writ and ordered the police to turn over documents relating to the drug war. The decision covered the turnover of police records on operations where suspects were killed. After hearings on a motion for reconsideration filed by the Office of the Solicitor General, the Supreme Court upheld on April 3, 2018, its earlier decision and ordered the solicitor general and the Philippine National Police to submit data related to the government's war on drugs.
- On May 22, 2018, the Supreme Court upheld a Court of Appeals decision for the issuance of the writs of amparo and habeas data to human rights lawyer Maria Catherine Dannug-Salucon. The Court of Appeals had earlier ordered the Armed Forces of the Philippines to identify and file charges against personnel that were allegedly harassing Salucon for representing political prisoners.
- In August 2022, the Supreme Court upheld the writ of amparo issued in relation to an extrajudicial killing in the Philippine drug war. The Supreme Court decision court denied the petition for review by Antipolo police officers questioning the Court of Appeals 2018 decision and 2019 resolution upholding the writ of amparo in favor of the victim's widow. The Supreme Court said that "In denying the petition, the court explicitly recognized the death of Joselito Gonzales as an extralegal killing".
- In July 2023, the Supreme Court ruled that a writ of amparo may be issued against acts of red-tagging, vilification, labeling, and guilt by association, declaring that the aforementioned acts threatens a person's right to life, liberty, and security.
- In February 2024, the Supreme Court granted writs of habeas data and amparo for environmental activists Jonila Castro and Jhed Tamano, who were abducted by masked armed men. The Supreme Court said of their case, "elements of enforced disappearance were present, specifically that petitioners were forcibly taken on September 2, 2023" and ruled that "there was an established violation or threat to the life, liberty, or security of petitioners by respondents". The court also prohibited the Philippine National Police, the Philippine Army, and the National Task Force to End Local Communist Armed Conflict from coming within a one-kilometer radius of the Castro, Tamano, and their families. In October 2024, Supreme Court granted writs of habeas data and amparo for another environmental activist, Francisco Dangla III, who was reportedly abducted by masked armed individuals.
- In September 2024, the Supreme Court issued writs of amparo and habeas data in favor of the families of activists Gene Roz Jamil "Bazoo" de Jesus and Dexter Capuyan, who were abducted in April 2023, ordering the Philippine National Police, the Armed Forces of the Philippines, the Criminal Investigation and Detection Group, Lorraine Badoy, and Jeffrey Celiz to provide information about the whereabouts of de Jesus and Capuyan. The Supreme Court also granted a temporary protection order prohibiting the respondents from coming within a kilometer of the families of de Jesus and Capuyan.
- On January 9, 2025, a Muntinlupa Regional Trial Court granted Vic Sotto's petition and issued a writ of habeas data. The prerogative writ ordered the censorship of portions of The Rapists of Pepsi Paloma promotional teaser trailer and at the same time required respondent Darryl Yap to submit an answer. Lawyer Enrique "Buko" V. Dela Cruz, Jr. said that Sotto's daughter was bullied in school because of Yap's alleged defamation for which the writ was requested.
- The Supreme Court announced on February 5, 2025, that it issued writs of amparo and habeas data to the family of Felix Salaveria Jr., an environmental activist who was abducted in Tabaco City, Albay, on August 28, 2024. The issuance orders respondents Executive Secretary Lucas Bersamin, the Armed Forces of the Philippines, and the Philippine National Police to present information they may have on Salaveria.

=== First landmark amparo Supreme Court judgment ===
The Supreme Court of the Philippines, on October 7, 2008, rendered its first amparo decision, affirming the December 26, 2007, Philippine Court of Appeals judgment in favor of Raymond and Reynaldo Manalo brothers. Reynato Puno's 49-page unanimous ponencia granted amparo relief to the Manalo brothers who were abducted by the Citizens Armed Forces Geographical Unit (CAFGU) in San Ildefonso, Bulacan, in February 2006. They escaped on August 13, 2007, after 18 months of detention and torture.

== Comment ==
On September 28, 2007, the Asian Human Rights Commission (AHRC) said the new writ of amparo and habeas data in themselves are not enough to resolve the problems of extra-legal killings and enforced disappearances in the Philippines. It said that there must be a cooperative action on all parts of the government and civil society:

Though it responds to practical areas it is still necessary that further action must be taken in addition to this. The legislative bodies, House of Representatives and Senate, should also initiate its own actions promptly and without delay. They must enact laws which ensure protection of rights—laws against torture and enforced disappearance and laws to afford adequate legal remedies to victims.

The AHRC also said that protection provided by the writ of amparo does not extend to non-witnesses whose lives may also be threatened.

== See also ==
- Associate Justice of the Supreme Court of the Philippines
- Chief Justice of the Supreme Court of the Philippines
- Habeas Corpus Restoration Act of 2007
- Philippine Habeas Corpus Cases
