= Reynato Puno =

Filipino judge (born 1940)

The Honorable Reynato S. Puno KGCR
- Puno in 2026

22nd Chief Justice of the Supreme Court
- In office December 7, 2006 – May 17, 2010
- Appointed by: Gloria Macapagal Arroyo
- Preceded by: Artemio Panganiban
- Succeeded by: Renato Corona

33rd Senior Associate Justice of the Supreme Court
- In office November 13, 2003 – December 7, 2006
- Preceded by: Josue N. Bellosillo
- Succeeded by: Leonardo Quisumbing

131st Associate Justice of the Supreme Court
- In office June 28, 1993 – December 7, 2006
- Appointed by: Fidel V. Ramos
- Preceded by: Hugo Gutiérrez
- Succeeded by: Antonio Eduardo Nachura

Chairperson of the Consultative Committee to Review the 1987 Constitution
- Incumbent
- Assumed office January 23, 2018
- Appointed by: Rodrigo Duterte

Personal details
- Born: May 17, 1940 (age 86) Manila, Philippine Commonwealth
- Spouse: Luzviminda Delgado
- Education: University of the Philippines Diliman (LL.B); Southern Methodist University (LL.M); University of California, Berkeley (LL.M); University of Illinois Urbana-Champaign (SJD)

Reynato Serrano Puno, KGCR (born May 17, 1940) is a Filipino jurist. He served as the 22nd chief justice of the Supreme Court of the Philippines from December 7, 2006, by President Gloria Macapagal Arroyo until his mandatory retirement on May 17, 2010. Puno had initially been appointed to the Supreme Court as an associate justice on June 28, 1993.

Puno was appointed on January 23, 2018, as the chairperson of the Consultative Committee to Review the 1987 Constitution by virtue of Executive Order No. 10.

Puno is also the chairman of the solar energy company named "GenWATT".

== Profile ==
Puno earned his law degree from the University of the Philippines Diliman. During his stay in the state university, he also served as editor of The Philippine Collegian. He became a member of the Alpha Phi Beta Fraternity in 1959. He would later finish post-graduate studies at Southern Methodist University, Dallas, Texas (Master of Comparative Laws), University of California, Berkeley (Master of Laws), and University of Illinois (finished all academic requirements of the degree of Doctor of Judicial Science).

Puno began his legal career in private practice. In 1969, he joined the law practice of his elder brother Isaac, a future judge whose murder at age 42 remains unsolved to date. In 1971, he joined the Office of the Solicitor General, where he would serve for the next nine years. In 1980, Puno was appointed by President Ferdinand Marcos as a Justice of the Court of Appeals. He rejoined the executive department in 1984, this time as a Deputy Minister of Justice. Upon the assumption into office of President Corazon Aquino in 1986, Puno was reappointed to the Court of Appeals.

Puno has been praised for his erudite and literary writing style. His predecessor as Chief Justice, Artemio Panganiban, once lauded Puno's writing in the following manner: "Like a trained surgeon, he uses his pen with razor-like precision to separate the excise fabrication from truth and pretension from reality. In the process, he gives life to populist causes and libertarian ideals. Darting, gutsy and erudite, he often wages lonely battles against conventional wisdom with his stirring dissents and insightful opinion." (Panganiban, Justice and Faith, p. 142)

=== Freemason ===
Puno is a freemason and Past Grand Master of the Grand Lodge of the Philippines. MW Reynato S. Puno PGM is from Hiram Lodge No. 88, and also a charter member of Jacques DeMolay Memorial Lodge No.305, and also a dual member of Dagohoy Lodge No. 84.

== Supreme Court term ==
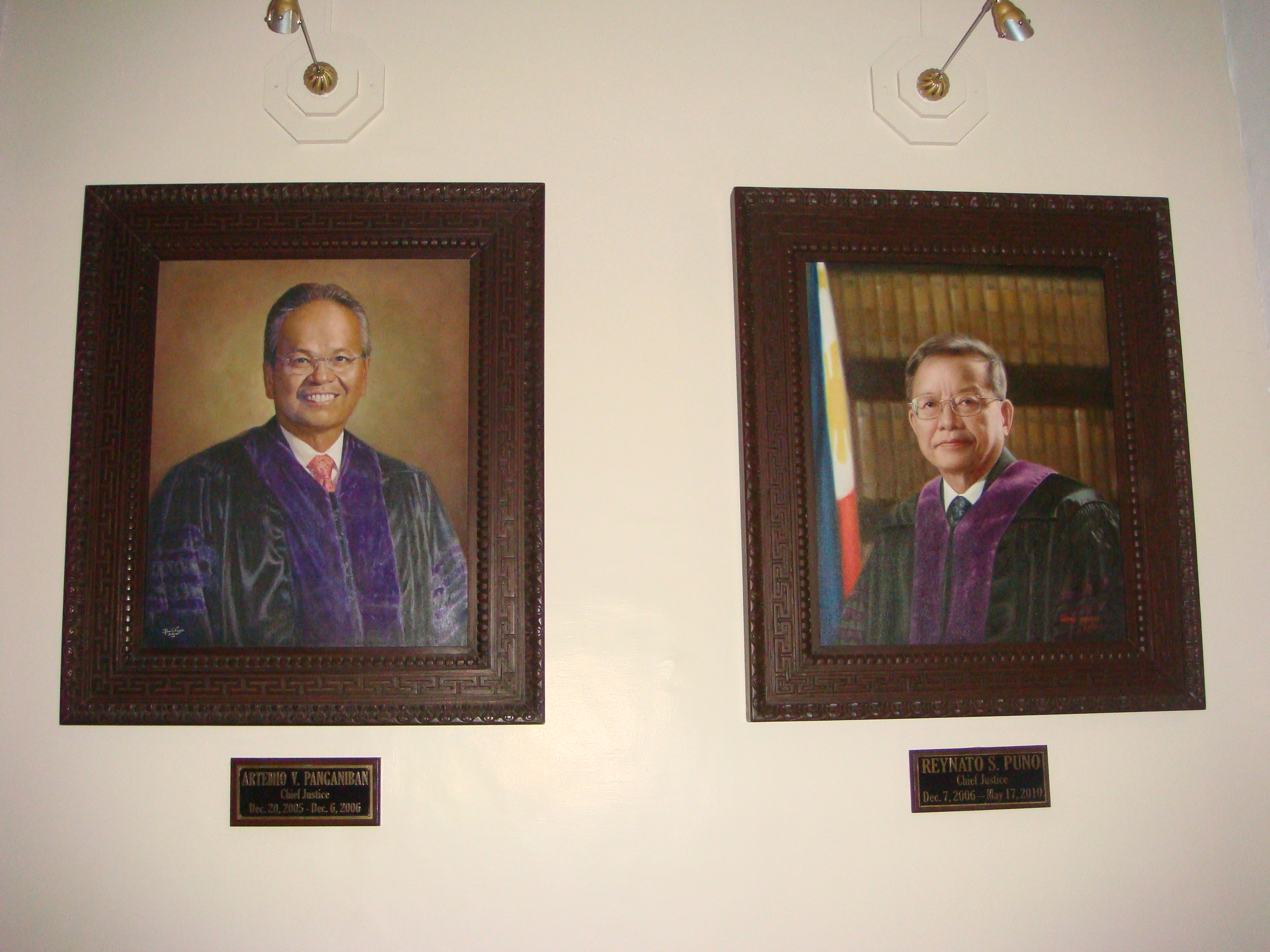
Official Portraits of CJ Artemio Panganiban and Reynato S. Puno in the new SC building.

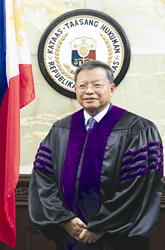
Official portrait as Chief Justice

On June 28, 1993, President Fidel V. Ramos appointed Puno as an Associate Justice of the Supreme Court at the age of 53. He would serve in that capacity for the next 13 years. Upon the retirement of Justice Josue Bellosillo in 2003, Puno became the Senior Associate Justice.

Traditionally, the most senior Associate Justice was appointed to fill any permanent vacancy to the seat of the Chief Justice, though this tradition was not always observed. Upon the retirement of Chief Justice Hilario Davide Jr. in 2005, Puno, as the senior Associate Justice, was a leading candidate for appointment as the next Chief Justice. However, President Gloria Macapagal-Arroyo instead appointed Associate Justice Artemio Panganiban as Chief Justice, marking the first time in 20 years that the senior Associate Justice was bypassed.

Justice Puno remained as the most senior Associate Justice for the twelve months of the term of Chief Justice Panganiban. Despite some speculation that President Arroyo would again bypass Puno and appoint either Associate Justice Leonardo Quisumbing or Senator Miriam Defensor Santiago as Chief Justice, Puno was appointed to the post within hours from the retirement of Panganiban. Puno denied speculations that he will retire from the position of Chief Justice before May 17, 2010.

=== Performance rating ===
On January 7, 2008, the Social Weather Stations (November 30 to December 3, 2007) survey released the performance rating of Chief Justice Reynato Puno - 32% satisfied and 34% dissatisfied, or net –2, having been in single digit since March 2007.

== Honors ==
Puno was named one of the Ten Outstanding Young Men (TOYM) of the Philippines award in the field of law in 1977. He was also one of the Outstanding Alumnus of the Alpha Phi Beta fraternity - UP College of Law in 1975. As a member of the Judiciary, he has received honorary doctorates from Wesleyan University Philippines, the Angeles University Foundation, Bulacan State University, Hannam University of South Korea, the Central Philippine University, University of the East, Polytechnic University of the Philippines, University of the Philippines and Silliman University.

In 1996, he was chosen the "Outstanding Alumnus" by the University of the Philippines College of Law.

=== 2008 WPPAC award ===
The World Peace Prize Awarding Council (WPPAC) Chief Judge and Co-Founder Lester Wolff and WPPAC Executive Judge and Co-Founder Dr. Han Min Su, WPPAC Sec. Gen. Judge Dr. Asher Naim, and WPPAC Judge Dr. Mohammad A. Cholkamy, on October, recognized Puno as 2008 Human Cultural Asset International.

== Family ==
Puno was married to Luzviminda T. Delgado-Puno (1940–2006), a lawyer who had been the Clerk of Court of the Supreme Court from 1993 to 2005. She died at 5:10 am, April 12, 2006, at the St. Luke's Medical Hospital, Quezon City due to complications from heart surgery. On April 25, 2007, Narcisa "Sisang" Serrano Puno, 92, mother of Chief Justice Reynato S. Puno, died at the Philippine Heart Center in Quezon City.

== Year one ==
=== Extrajudicial killings summit ===
The 22nd Puno Supreme Court held a National Consultative Summit on extrajudicial killings on July 16 and 17, 2007 at the Manila Hotel. Invited representatives from the three branches of the government participated (including the AFP, the PNP, CHR, media, academe, civil society and other stakeholders). Puno gave the keynote speech and closing remarks. Puno searches for major solutions to solve forced disappearances. During the first day of the summit, the speakers presented their respective papers comprising significant inputs from their respective sectors, while on the second day, the participants were broken up into 12 groups (chaired by a Justice) and take part in a workshop. Local and international observers (the diplomatic corps and representatives from various international organizations) were accredited. Puno informed that "the summit highlight will be a plenary session where each of the 12 groups shall report to the body their recommended resolutions. The reports and proposals were synthesized and then transmitted to the concerned government agencies for appropriate action". On the other hand, the earlier slated Malacañang-sponsored Mindanao Peace and Security Summit (July 8–10, 2007 at Cagayan de Oro City), would focus on how to make the anti-terror law, or the Human Security Act (HSA) of 2007, more acceptable to the public. It would probably steal the thunder from Puno's own summit on extrajudicial killings and forced disappearances.

On July 16, 2007, Justices, activists, militant leaders, police officials, politicians and prelates attended the Supreme Court's two-day summit at the Manila Hotel in Manila City to map out ways to put an end to the string of extrajudicial killings in the country. Bayan was set to launch their "silent protest", but expressed support for the high court's initiative. Director Geary Barias, chief of the police's anti-killings Task Force Usig, Sen. Panfilo Lacson, Manila Mayor Alfredo Lim, Caloocan Bishop Deogracias Yñiguez, reelected party-list Representatives Satur Ocampo (Bayan Muna) and Crispin Beltran (Anakpawis) graced the affair. SC Chief Justice Reynato Puno said that the "National Consultative Summit on Extrajudicial Killings and Forced Disappearances: Searching for Solutions," would help stop the murders. Delegates were given 12 to 15 minutes each to share their insights and knowledge about the matter. Yniguez scored the government for failing to actively pursue investigations on the hundreds of killings, and the Catholic Church was alarmed that victims have been deprived of their "fundamental right" to live. Based on Yniguez-church's count, the number of victims of extrajudicial killings reached 778, while survivors of "political assassinations," was pegged at 370. He also noted 203 "massacre" victims, 186 people who involuntarily disappeared, 502 tortured, and others who were illegally arrested. Yniguez similarly criticized the government's alleged insistence to implement its Oplan Bantay Laya I and II, the military's counter-insurgency operation-plans which militants have said consider legal people's organizations as targets. Meanwhile, Bayan urged the Supreme Court to "check serious threats to civil liberties and basic freedoms" including the anti-terror law or the Human Security Act of 2007, which took effect on July 15 despite protests from leftist groups. Vice President Teofisto Guingona Jr. joined Bayan and other leftist groups as petitioners in their formal pleading before the Supreme Court challenging the constitutionality of the law. Human rights lawyer Edre Olalia of the International Association of People's Lawyers (IAPL) served as lead counsel. Bayan chair Carol Araullo said the respondents included members of the Anti-Terrorism Council headed by Executive Secretary Eduardo Ermita and Raul Gonzalez. Earlier, CBCP president Angel Lagdameo pointed out at least 5 provisions of the law that may threaten civil liberties: Sec. 19 allows detentions of mere suspects for more than three days in the event of an actual or terrorist attack, while Section 26 allows house arrest despite the posting of bail, and prohibits the right to travel and to communicate with others; Sec. 39 allows seizure of assets while Sec. 7 allows surveillance or wiretapping of suspects; Sec. 26 allows the investigation of bank deposits and other assets.

Puno SC summit called for truce, talks with insurgents, as the two-day summit ended: "Let us rather engage in the conspiracy of hope...and hope for peace." Puno said he would forward the summit's recommendation to President Gloria Macapagal Arroyo, the Senate and House of Representatives. "In the clash of arms, the laws are silent. We need to reduce violence, create conditions conducive to less violence based on the rule of law", Associate Justice Conchita Carpio-Morales said in the report. One group recommended that Republic Act 9372 or the Human Security Act be declared unconstitutional. All the groups agreed that insurgency is not only a military but also a political problem and said a ceasefire would be a sign of the government's goodwill and sincerity in forging genuine peace agreements with all rebel groups. They also recommended the use of the third-party approach to peace negotiations. Among the other recommendations of the summit are: -- for the Supreme Court to reexamine the case of Umil v. Ramos, which said rebellion and related crimes are continuing offenses, thus allowing the warrantless arrest of suspects; to carefully study the possibility of creating a new offense for the killings and assaults on journalists, judges and activities, akin to the law penalizing violence against woman and children; the establishment of sanctuaries where victims and witnesses can take refuge; for the President to certify and the Senate to ratify the Rome Statute, which established the International Criminal Court, and Protocol 1 of the Geneva Convention, which addresses the issue of making civilian populations or individual civilians the object of attacks; the enactment of a law addressing and accurately defining extrajudicial killings and enforced disappearances; a study on the use of the writ of Amparo for greater protection of Constitutional rights, and a more creative and resourceful application of the writ of habeas corpus; suspending the presumption of regularity in the performance of official duty in cases of extrajudicial killings and enforced disappearance; studying whether the government can continue invoking its immunity from suspension in cases of extrajudicial killings and enforced disappearances; allowing petitioners for the writ of habeas corpus to seek court orders to search the premises of police and military camps and stations in the presence of a representative from the Commission on Human Rights; requiring the Department of Interior and Local Government (DILG) to take DNA samples of unidentified cadavers for preservation in the Philippine National Police laboratory; the adoption of international standards of command responsibility; the enhancement of moral, ethical and constitutional values that put a premium on tolerance and the rule of law.

The CPP, however said that the abuses will continue "so long as the mastermind remains in power." "Extra-judicial killings and enforced disappearances will continue as long as the mastermind remains in power and enforces a deliberate state terrorist policy that sets the stage for gross violations of human rights." CPP spokesman Gregorio "Ka Roger" Rosal said that the New People's Army (NPA) and people's courts are conducting their own investigations and are intensifying efforts to investigate and resolve particular cases of extrajudicial killings and abductions. Rosal cited the case of Capt. Patrick Baesa, an intelligence officer under the notorious 901st Infantry Battalion, who was meted out revolutionary punishment last November 2006. Baesa, who was based in Irosin, Albay, was responsible for organizing the death squads which carried out the killings of Max Frivaldo, Ding Uy, Rei Mon Guran and Barangay Chairman Neal Futalan."But ultimately it is the Arroyo regime and its top security and military officials who should be punished for these heinous crimes", he said. Further, former vice president Teofisto Guingona and BAYAN petitioned the Court to declare the Human Security Act (HSA) unconstitutional. The 89-page petition for certiorari and prohibition with a prayer for temporary restraining order against the implementation of the anti-terror law. Other petitioners were Gabriela, Kilusang Magbubukid ng Pilipinas, Movement of Concerned Citizens for Civil Liberties, state workers' group COURAGE, Kadamay, Solidarity of Cavite Workers, League of Filipino Students, HEAD, Anakbayan, Pamalakaya, Alliance of Concerned Teachers, Migrante and AGHAM.

Twin horrible deaths happened on / circa the same day last year, January 15, 2007, that the Supreme Court of the Philippines' (logo or seal) was mysteriously burned into halves by an almost one-hour afternoon fire. Despite different appeals by local and international groups, the spate of extrajudicial killings in the Philippines continued. On January 15, 2008, Reynato Puno condemned the murder of Judge Roberto Navidad, Regional Trial Court, Branch 32, Calbayog, Samar, the 15th judge to be ambushed since July 20, 1999, the 14th under the Arroyo government. Just starting his engine, black Nissan Patrol SUV, Natividad was shot in the face / left eye, at 7:10 p.m. Monday, by a lone gunman, 5'4" tall and medium-built, wearing black jacket, using a 45 caliber pistol. On Tuesday, Catholic missionary Rey Roda, Oblates of Marry Immaculate (OMI), 54, was shot dead at 8:30 p.m., when he resisted abduction attempt by unidentified 10 armed men in a chapel at ikud Tabawan village, South Ubian, Tawi-Tawi, South Ubian. In February 1997, another OMI leader, Bishop Benjamin de Jesus was shot dead in front of the Jolo cathedral. In 2006, the Asian Human Rights Commission stated that there had been 26 priests, pastors, and churchmen who were liquidate or were victims of violence under the Gloria Macapagal Arroyo administration since 2001. This includes 3 priests who were reported killed just in 2007: Basilio Bautista of the Iglesia Filipina Reform Group, in Surigao del Sur, Indonesian priest Fransiskus Madhu, in Kalinga province, and Catholic priest Florante Rigonan, in Ilocos Norte.

=== Writ of Amparo ===
On August 17, 2007, Puno said that the writ of amparo (Spanish for protection), would strip the military of the defense of denial (Volunteers Against Crime and Corruption's 9th anniversary celebration at Camp Crame). Under the writ, families of victims would have the right to access information on their cases—a constitutional right called the "habeas data" common in several Latin America countries. The final version of the rule, which was made retroactive, would come out by next month. Puno stated that "In other words, if you have this right, it would be very, very difficult for State agents, State authorities to be able to escape from their culpability."

On September 15, 2007, lawyer Neri Javier Colmenares (National Union of People's Lawyers) announced that the Supreme Court of the Philippines committee on the revision of rules drafted the writ of amparo rules, which were promulgated in October. The writ of amparo (Spanish for protection) is a defense to prevent extrajudicial killings and forced disappearances. As supplement, recourse to "habeas data," to grant the right of access information on desaparecidos, was also provided.

==== Historical promulgation of Writ of Amparo ====
On September 25, 2007, Chief Justice Reynato Puno officially announced the Supreme Court of the Philippines' approval or promulgation of the Writ of Amparo: "Today, the Supreme Court promulgated the rule that will place the constitutional right to life, liberty and security above violation and threats of violation. This rule will provide the victims of extralegal killings and enforced disappearances the protection they need and the promise of vindication for their rights. This rule empowers our courts to issue reliefs that may be granted through judicial orders of protection, production, inspection and other relief to safeguard one's life and liberty The writ of amparo shall hold public authorities, those who took their oath to defend the constitution and enforce our laws, to a high standard of official conduct and hold them accountable to our people. The sovereign Filipino people should be assured that if their right to life and liberty is threatened or violated, they will find vindication in our courts of justice."

==== A.M. No. 07-9-12-SC, The Rule on Writ of Amparo ====
The Resolution and the Rule on the Writ of Amparo gave legal birth to Puno's brainchild. No filing or legal fees are required for Amparo which took effect on October 24 in time for the 62nd anniversary of the United Nations. Puno also stated that the court would soon issue rules on the writ of habeas data and the implementing guidelines for habeas corpus. The petition for the writ of amparo may be filed "on any day and at any time" with the Regional Trial Court, or with the Sandiganbayan, the Court of Appeals, and the Supreme Court. The interim reliefs under amparo are: temporary protection order (TPO), inspection order (IO), production order (PO), and witness protection order (WPO, RA 6981).

===== International comment =====
On September 28, 2007, the Asian Human Rights Commission (AHRC) commented that the Writ of Amparo and Habeas Data (Philippines) was insufficient: "Though it responds to practical areas it is still necessary that further action must be taken in addition to this. The legislative bodies, House of Representatives and Senate, should also initiate its own actions promptly and without delay. They must enact laws which ensure protection of rights—laws against torture and enforced disappearance and laws to afford adequate legal remedies to victims." AHRC noted that the writ was not enough to protect non-witnesses, even if they, too, face threats or risk to their lives.

== Year two ==
The Puno court held its first multisectoral meeting in 2007 to address the issue of extrajudicial killings and forced disappearances in the Philippines. Puno announced that his Court would hold the 2nd summit, dubbed as "Forum on Increasing Access to Justice: Bridging Gaps and Removing Roadblocks," which were held simultaneously in 3 venues in Luzon, the Visayas and Mindanao from June 30 to July 1, 2008, via videoconferencing. The "Access to Justice for the Poor Project" was implemented on June 30, 2008, in 36 municipalities in the 15 poorest provinces, with the assistance of the Department of Social Welfare and Development (DSWD), Department of Interior and Local Government (DILG), the Department of Justice (DOJ) and the Alternative Law Groups Inc. The forum "Increasing Access to Justice" found that aside from poverty, exorbitant legal fees and the infrequent use of Tagalog during court hearings also affected judicial access.

=== Justice on Wheels (JOW) project ===
Puno and Alfredo Lim, on July 9, 2008, re-launched the Supreme Court's Justice on Wheels (JOW) Project, to improve access of justice to the poor, specifically, those who are above 70 years, and detainees whose cases had dragged for longer periods than prescribed by law. The justice-on-wheels program, borrowed from Guatemala justice system, was first launched in the Philippines on 2004 with World Bank and Asian Development Bank funds. 4 buses were converted into mobile courtrooms, to have served Manila and other regions. The Manila City Jail was built for only 1,000 inmates but was crammed with 4,602.

=== Case Management Information System (CMIS) ===
The United States donated 50 computer units and other related equipment to the High Tribunal during the July 23, 2008, launching of the Case Management Information System (CMIS) by Reynato Puno and Kristie Kenney, to reduce the judiciary's case backlog and congested dockets. The computers are part of the US $650,000 US Agency for International Development (Usaid) grant for the CMIS, "to develop the software, build the information structure, for technical assistance and training of the justices and court personnel (of the SC, Court of Tax Appeals, Court of Appeals and the Sandiganbayan)."

Puno said: "We have our zero backlog program; we continue to review, revise and simplify the Rules of Court; we have established special courts, etc." Rule of Law Effectiveness (RoLE) Project of CMIS aims "to (1) reduce delay and prevent case congestion, as well as to generally speed up the pace of litigation, (2) strengthen judicial accountability and its integrity infrastructure, (3) enhance the capacity of Justices to manage caseload more efficiently and in a more convenient manner, (4) improve access to justice and public access to relevant information on cases, and (5) improve capacities for sound oversight planning, monitoring, and evaluation of court operations and performance and support better supervision of court operations."

=== Small Claims Court Pilot Project ===
On September 30, 2008, Puno officially launched the Small Claims Court Pilot Project, the "Rule of Procedure for Small Claims Cases" (AM No. 08-8-7-SC), effective in 22 pilot courts, per A.M. No. 141-2008. 70% of Metro Manila Metropolitan Trial Courts' case loads consist of small claims cases, filed by indigents. The new Rule now provides for "an inexpensive and expeditious means to settle actions before first-level courts, excluding Sharia (Arabic: شريعة Circuit Courts, for money claims not exceeding PHP100,000. No attorneys are allowed and user-friendly forms are provided. Decisions are also required to be rendered on the first day of hearing. The decision in a small claims case shall be final and unappealable, except extra-ordinary appeals through certiorari." The Rule was promulgated by the Supreme Court of the Philippines pursuant to its "Increasing Access to Justice Program" with support funds from the United States Agency for International Development and the American Bar Association–Rule of Law Initiative.

== University of the Philippines Board of Regents ==
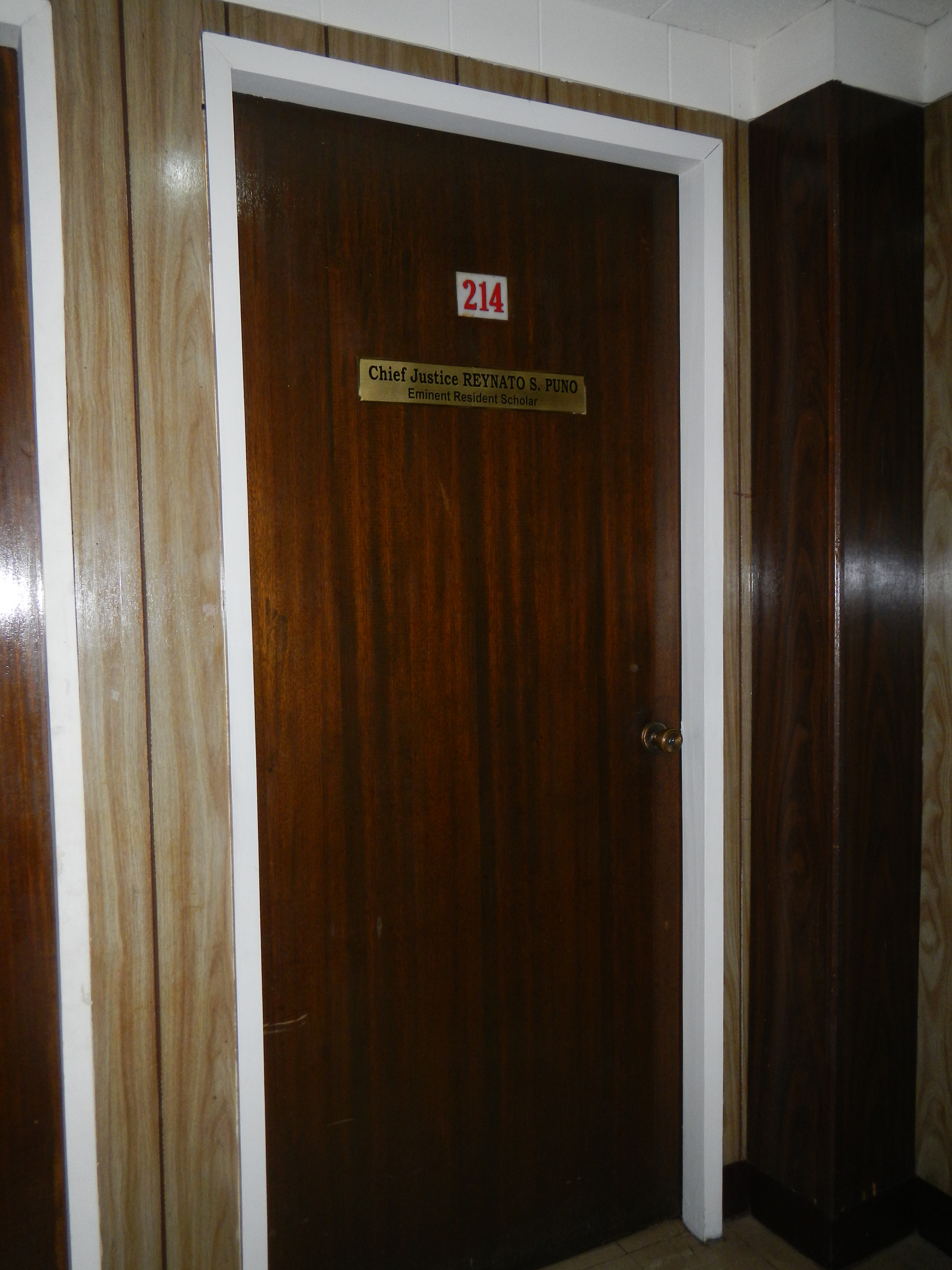
Eminent Resident Scholar Reynato S. Puno Room 214 (University of the Philippines College of Law )

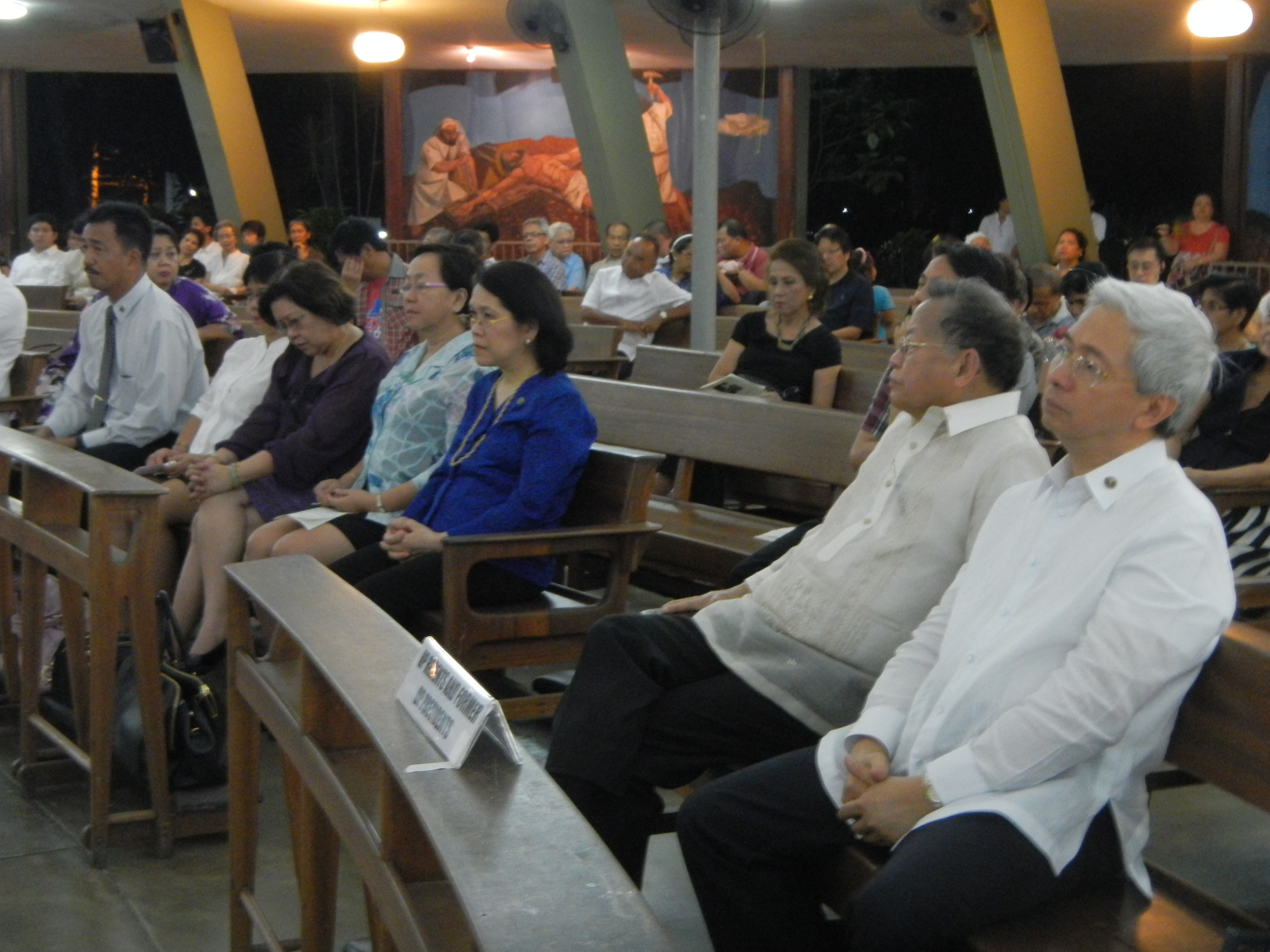
Puno (at the Onofre Corpuz April 1, 2013 eulogy)

Puno was re-appointed to his second term as a member of the University of the Philippines Board of Regents and received sums of money until September 30, 2014.

Legal offices
Preceded by Hugo Gutiérrez	Associate Justice of the Supreme Court; 1993–2007	Succeeded by Antonio Eduardo Nachura
Preceded by Josue Bellosillo	Senior Associate Justice of the Supreme Court; 2003–2006	Succeeded by Leonardo Quisumbing
Preceded by Artemio Panganiban	Chief Justice of the Supreme Court; 2006–2010	Succeeded by Renato Corona
