= Extrajudicial killings and forced disappearances in the Philippines =

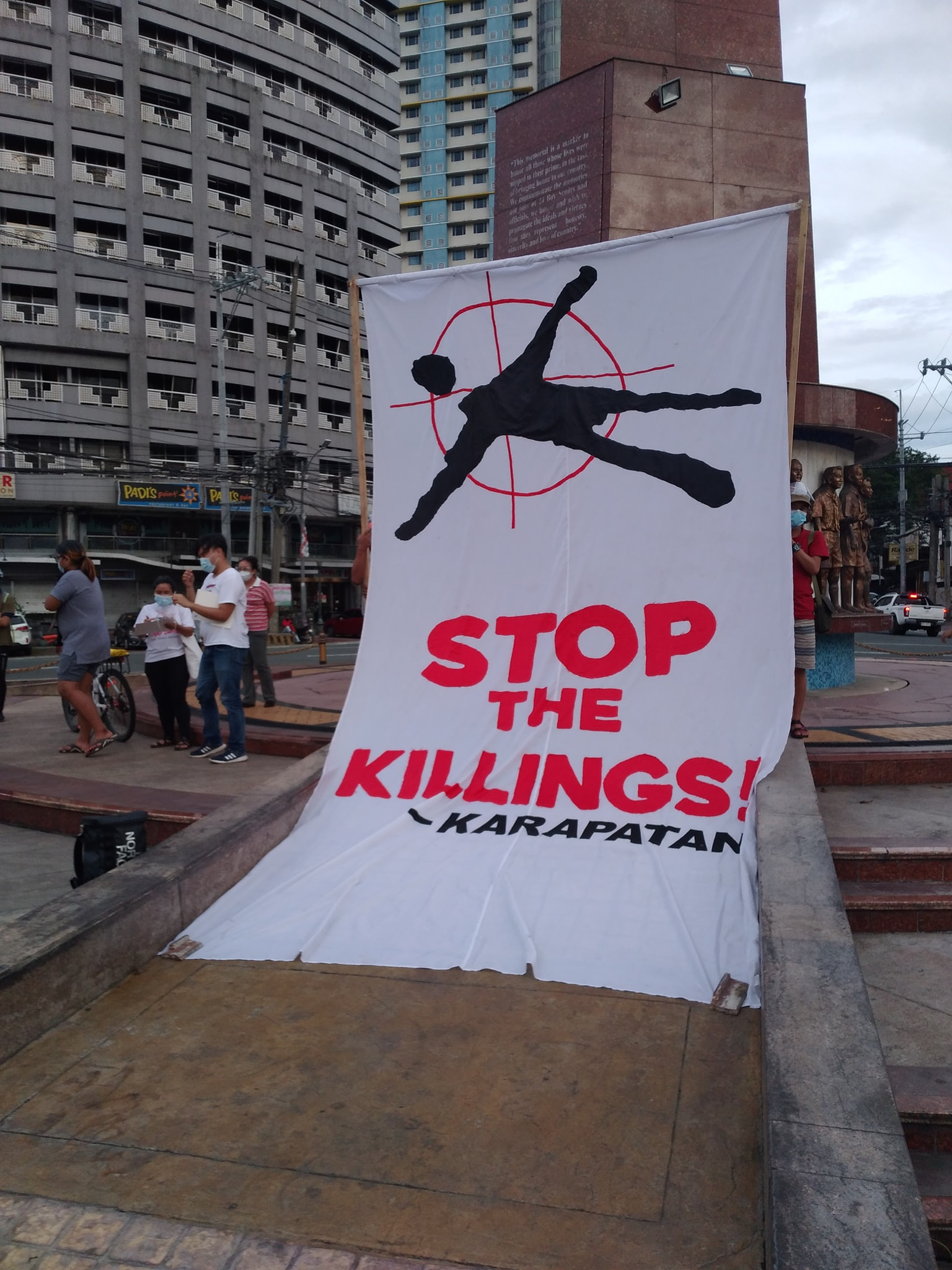
Stop the Killings in the Philippines banner.

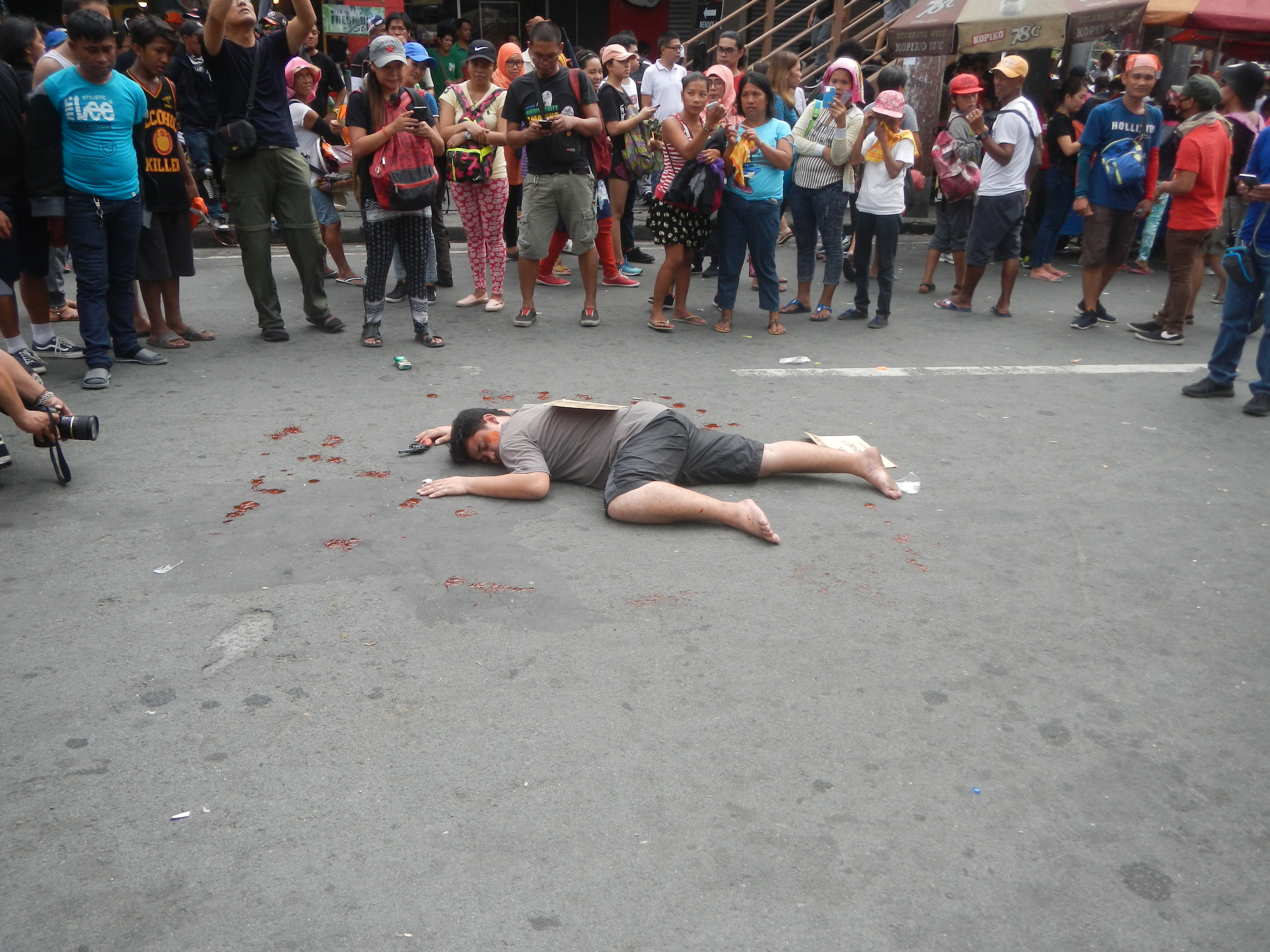
A reenactment of an extrajudicial killing during the 'National Day of Protest' on September 21, 2017, on the 45th Anniversary of the Proclamation of Martial Law

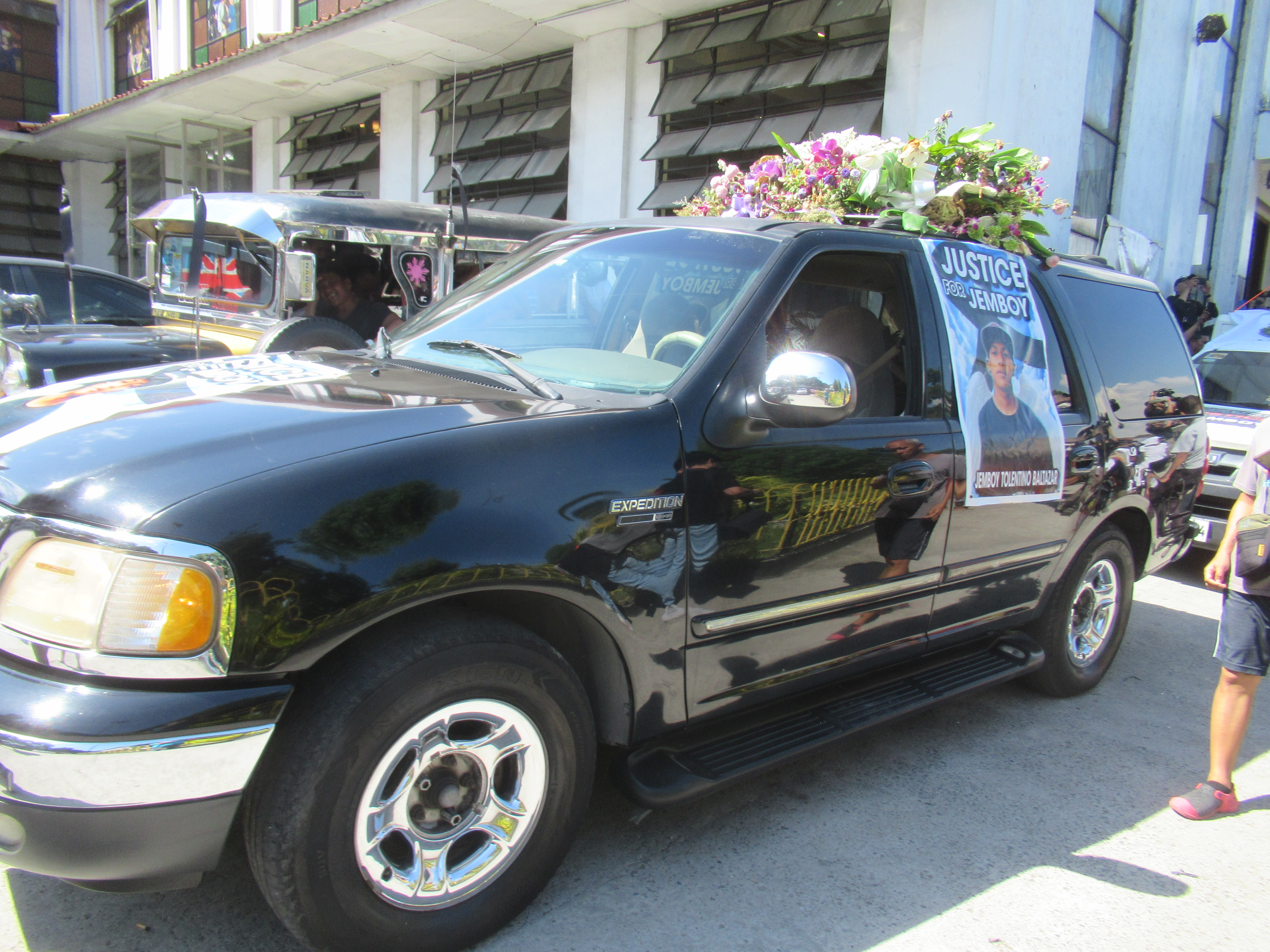
On August 2, 2023, Jerhode Baltazar was shot (mistaken for a murderer) by Navotas cops

Extrajudicial killings and forced disappearances in the Philippines are illegal executions—unlawful or felonious killings—and forced disappearances in the Philippines. These are forms of extrajudicial punishment and include extrajudicial executions, summary executions, arbitrary arrest and detentions, and failed prosecutions due to the political activities of leading political figures, trade union members, dissidents or social figures, left-wing political parties, non-governmental organizations, political journalists, outspoken clergy, anti-mining activists, agricultural reform activists, and members of organizations that are alleged to be allied with or legal fronts of the communist movement or claimed supporters of the NPA and its political wing, the Communist Party of the Philippines (CPP). Other frequent targets are ancestral land rights defenders, Indigenous rights activists, environmentalists, and human rights activists.

Extrajudicial killings are most commonly referred to as salvaging in Philippine English. The word is believed to be a direct anglicization of Tagalog "salbahe" ("cruel" or "barbaric"), from Spanish "salvaje" ("wild" or "savage").

EJKs that occurred during the administration of Rodrigo Duterte, at the subnational level, are more likely to occur in provinces that have high population densities, stronger state capacities, and those that are more affluent in terms of economic development. It is also found that higher rates of EJKs are correlated with provinces that have severe drug addiction rates and those areas where Duterte's vote share in the 2016 elections is highest, indicating the presence of vertical accountability.

== Nature ==
Philippine extrajudicial killings are politically motivated murders committed by government officers not punished by local and international law or convention. They include assassinations, deaths due to strafing or indiscriminate firing, and massacres. Killings occurred in many regions or places throughout the Philippines at different time. One hundred and thirty-six killings in the Southern Tagalog region were recorded by human rights group Karapatan from 2001 to May 19, 2006.

=== Desaparecidos ===
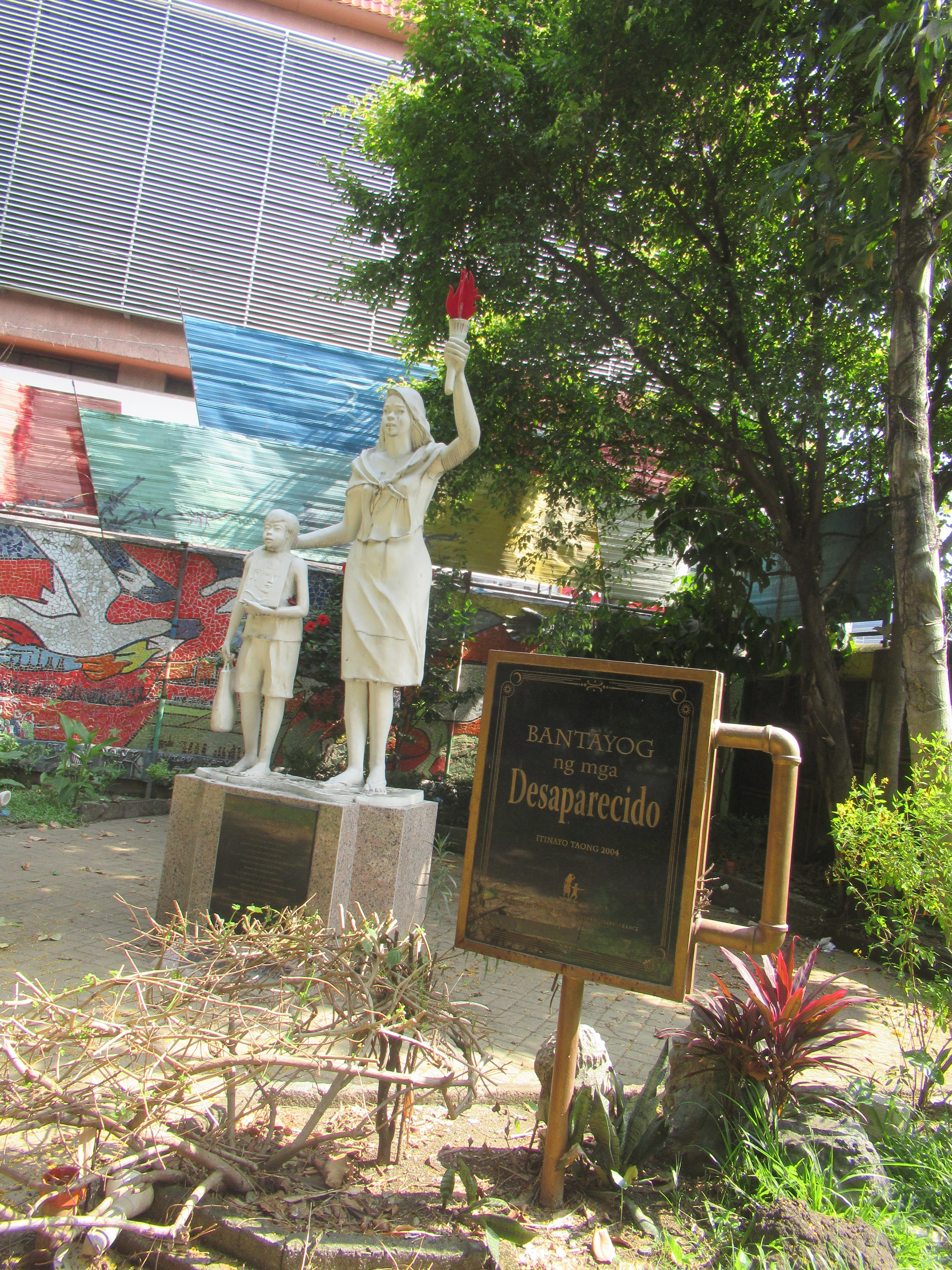
Bantayog Ng Mga Desaparecido at Baclaran Church

A forced disappearance (desaparecidos), on the other hand, as a form of extrajudicial punishment, is perpetrated by government officers when any of its public officers abduct an individual to vanish from public view, resulting in murder or plain sequestration. The victim is first kidnapped, then illegally detained in concentration camps, often tortured, and finally executed and the corpse hidden. International human rights groups have described the Philippines as a hotspot for enforced disappearances. According to Karapatan, there have been 1,900 cases of enforced disappearances in the Philippines since the dictatorship of Ferdinand Marcos.

In Spanish and Portuguese, "disappeared people" are called "desaparecidos", a term that specifically refers to the mostly South American victims of state terrorism during the 1970s and the 1980s, in particular concerning Operation Condor. In the International Convention for the Protection of All Persons from Enforced Disappearance, "enforced disappearance" is defined in Article 2 of the United Nations Convention Against Torture as "the arrest, detention, abduction, or any other form of deprivation of liberty by agents of the State or by persons or groups of persons acting with the authorization, support, or acquiescence of the State, followed by a refusal to acknowledge the deprivation of liberty or by concealment of the fate or whereabouts of the disappeared person, which place such a person outside the protection of the law."

Even if Philippine Republic Act No. 7438 provides for the rights of persons arrested or detained, it does not punish acts of enforced disappearances. Thus, on August 27, Bayan Muna (People First), Gabriela Women's Party (GWP), and Anakpawis (Toiling Masses) filed House Bill 223, later promulgated as Republic Act No. 10353—"An act defining and penalizing the crime of enforced or involuntary disappearance." In June 2007, Sen. Jinggoy Estrada filed Senate Bill No. 2405—"An Act Penalizing the Commission of Acts of Torture and Involuntary Disappearance of Persons Arrested, Detained, or Under Custodial Investigation and Granting Jurisdiction to the Commission on Human Rights to Conduct Preliminary Investigation for Violation of the Custodial Rights of the Accused, Amending for this Purpose Sections 2, 3, and 4 of RA 7438, and for Other Purposes." Relatives of desaparecidos have called on the Philippine government to ratify the International Convention for the Protection of All Persons Against Enforced Disappearance.

Relatives and Philippine human rights groups commemorate the disappeared on International Day of the Disappeared on August 30 every year.

== Background ==
=== Marcos regime ===
In 1995, 10,000 Filipinos won a U.S. class suit against the Ferdinand Marcos estate. The charges were filed by victims or their surviving relatives for torture, execution, and disappearances. Human rights groups placed the number of victims of extrajudicial killings under martial law at 1,500 and over 800 abductions. Karapatan, a local human rights group's records, show 759 involuntarily disappeared, their bodies never found. Military historian Alfred McCoy, in his book Closer than Brothers: Manhood at the Philippine Military Academy and in his speech "Dark Legacy," cites 3,257 extrajudicial killings, 35,000 torture victims, and 70,000 incarcerated during the Marcos years. In 2006, the newspaper Bulatlat placed the number of victims of arbitrary arrest and detention at 120,000.

The New People's Army (NPA) groups known as "Sparrow Units" were active in the mid-1980s, killing government officials, police personnel, military members, and anyone else they targeted for elimination. They were also part of an NPA operation called "Agaw Armas" (Filipino for "Seizing Weapons"), where they raided government armories as well as stealing weapons from slain military and police personnel. A low-level civil war with Muslims in the south, Al-Qaeda sympathizers, and communist insurgents has led to a general breakdown of law and order. The Philippine government has promised to curb the killings but is itself implicated in many of the killings.

Since 1975, the Armed Forces of the Philippines (AFP) have been deeply involved in politics. Because of the armed conflict, the military continued its campaign versus the New People's Army of the Communist Party of the Philippines (CPP). Since 1969, it aimed to establish a Marxist regime with armed rebellion against the government.

=== Arroyo administration ===
According to University of the Philippines professor Roland Tolentino, under President Gloria Macapagal Arroyo, left-wing nongovernmental organizations were critical of her administration. Members of these organizations who were red-tagged as members of the CPP and NPA were targeted in a series of political killings. In September 2007, Human Rights Watch investigated extrajudicial murders in the Philippines.

Three major investigation groups were commissioned, and their final reports were submitted and published:

- a) The Gloria Macapagal Arroyo government-appointed bodies: Task Force Usig created by Arroyo in August. As a special police body, it was assigned to solve 10 cases of killings. It claimed to have solved 21 cases by initiating court cases, but only 12 suspects were arrested.
- b) The Melo Commission, chaired by Supreme Court Associate Justice Jose Melo, with members National Bureau of Investigation Director Nestor Mantaring, Chief State Prosecutor Jovencito Zuño, Bishop Juan de Dios Pueblos, and Nelia Torres Gonzales. Its final report states, "There is no official or sanctioned policy on the part of the military or its civilian superiors to resort to what other countries euphemistically call 'alternative procedures'—meaning illegal executions. However, there is certainly evidence pointing the finger of suspicion at some elements and personalities in the armed forces, in particular General Jovito Palparan, as responsible for an undetermined number of killings, by allowing, tolerating, and even encouraging the killings." (Melo Commission report, p. 53)
- c) Philip Alston, the United Nations Special Rapporteur on Extrajudicial Executions, February 12 to 21, 2007.

== Remedies ==
=== Malacañang's peace summit and Puno's killings summit ===
Because of the magnitude of Philippine killings and desaparecidos, 22nd Chief Justice Reynato Puno of the Supreme Court of the Philippines called a National Consultative Summit on extrajudicial killings on July 16 and 17, 2007, at the Manila Hotel. Participants included representatives from government (including the Armed Forces of the Philippines, the PNP, the Commission on Human Rights (Philippines), media, academia, civil society, and other stakeholders. On the other hand, the Malacañang-sponsored "Mindanao Peace and Security Summit," July 8–10, 2007, in Cagayan de Oro, concentrated on the anti-terror law, or the Human Security Act (HSA) of 2007, to make it more acceptable to the public.

At the July 16 summit, Reynato Puno stated that the Commission on Human Rights reported the number of victims at 403 from 2001 to May 31, 2007. Karapatan reported 863 deaths until 2007 and more than 900 as of May 2008, and most of them were members of left-wing groups. Karapatan gave a breakdown of its figures on human rights violations: 7,442 victims of forced evacuations or displacement, 5,459 victims of indiscriminate firing of weapons, and 3,042 victims of food and economic blockade. The rights group Desparecidos reported as of May 15, 2008, 194 victims of enforced disappearances under the Arroyo administration, with the latest abduction of National Democratic Front political consultant for Cagayan Valley activist Randy Felix Malayao, 39, a volunteer worker.

Counsels for the Defense of Liberties (CODAL), Philippines, a lawyers’ organization stated that since 2001, 26 lawyers and 10 judges were killed due to their professions. 755 civilians had been killed extrajudicially, while 359 survived attacks. 184 persons were still missing.

Bishop Deogracias Iñiguez stated that on the CBCP/Catholic Church's count, the number of victims of extrajudicial killings is 778. Survivors of "political assassinations" reached 370. 203 victims were killed, 186 were missing or involuntarily disappeared, and 502 were tortured or illegally arrested. Iñiguez denounced the government's implementation of its Oplan Bantay Laya I and II.

=== Promulgation of Writs of Amparo and Habeas Data ===
Because of the inefficacy and insufficiency of the Philippines' Writ of Habeas Corpus, on September 25, 2007, Chief Justice Reynato Puno signed and released the Writ of Amparo: "This rule will provide the victims of extralegal killings and enforced disappearances the protection they need and the promise of vindication for their rights. This rule empowers our courts to issue reliefs that may be granted through judicial orders of protection, production, inspection and other relief to safeguard one's life and liberty. The writ of amparo shall hold public authorities, those who took their oath to defend the constitution and enforce our laws, to a high standard of official conduct and hold them accountable to our people. The sovereign Filipino people should be assured that if their right to life and liberty is threatened or violated, they will find vindication in our courts of justice."

Puno explained the interim reliefs under amparo: temporary protection order (TPO), inspection order (IO), production order (PO), and witness protection order (WPO, RA 6981). As a supplement to Amparo, on August 30, 2007, Puno, at Silliman University in Dumaguete, Negros Oriental, promised to release the writ of habeas data ("you should have the idea" or “you should have the data”), another new legal remedy to solve the extrajudicial killings and enforced disappearances. Puno explained that the writ of amparo denies to authorities the defense of simple denial, and habeas data can find out what information is held by the officer and rectify or even destroy erroneous data gathered. Brazil used the writ, followed by Colombia, Paraguay, Peru, Argentina, and Ecuador.

- On December 3, 2007, Reynato S. Puno stated that the writ released only three victims (including Luisito Bustamante, Davao City), since amparo was enforced on October 24: "I would like to think that after the enactment and effectivity (of the writ), the number of extrajudicial killings and disappearances has gone down."
- On December 17, 2007, Iloilo regional trial court Judge Narciso Aguilar granted a writ of amparo against President Gloria Macapagal Arroyo and 9 military and police officials to release Nilo Arado and Maria Luisa Posa-Dominado, activists abducted on April 12.
- On December 19, 2007, Dr. Edita Burgos petitioned the Philippine Court of Appeals to issue a writ of amparo against Armed Forces chief Gen. Hermogenes Esperon Jr. and Army chief Lt. Gen. Alexander Yano regarding her son Jonas's abduction on April 28.
- On December 27, 2007, the 2nd Division, Court of Appeals' 30-page decision penned by Associate Justice Lucas Bersamin granted the writ of amparo filed by Reynaldo and Raymond Manalo, abducted activists.
- The Center for International Law (CenterLaw) filed a petition for a writ of amparo on behalf of families of victims of the drug war of the government of the Philippines in October 2017. The Supreme Court (SC) of the Philippines granted the writ and ordered the police to turn over documents relating to their investigations on the drug war. In the same month, the Free Legal Assistance Group (FLAG), on behalf of families and a survivor of an alleged execution by local police, filed for a writ of amparo before the SC. After hearings on a motion for reconsideration by the Office of the Solicitor General, the SC on April 3, 2018, upheld its earlier decision and ordered the solicitor general and the Philippine National Police to submit data related to the government's war on drugs.

==== Comment ====
On September 28, 2007, the Asian Human Rights Commission (AHRC) commented that the amparo and habeas data were insufficient in themselves to protect human rights in the country: "Though it responds to practical areas, it is still necessary that further action must be taken in addition to this." The legislative bodies, the House of Representatives and the Senate, should also initiate their own actions promptly and without delay. They must enact laws which ensure protection of rights—laws against torture and enforced disappearance and laws to afford adequate legal remedies to victims. The AHRC added that the writs are not enough to protect non-witnesses, even though they, too, face threats to their lives.

=== International groups' 2006 and 2008 probe of killings ===
In 2006, the Dutch Lawyers for Lawyers Foundation and Lawyers without Borders, with the support of the Netherlands Bar Association, the Amsterdam Bar Association, and the International Association of Democratic Lawyers, created a fact-finding mission in different parts of the Philippines. The international groups conducted interviews of various legal sectors from June 15 to 20, 2006.

In November 2008, the Dutch Lawyers for Lawyers Foundation conducted a follow-up verification and fact-finding mission (IVFFM) in Manila and Mindanao with the National Host Committee, the National Union of Peoples' Lawyers (NUPL), and the Counsels for the Defense of Liberties (CODAL). This team is composed of 8 judges and lawyers from Belgium and the Netherlands, who had dialogue with Reynato Puno on the probe of killings.

=== "Desaparecidos" law ===
Anti-Enforced or Involuntary Disappearance Act of 2012

Congress of the Philippines
- Long title: An Act defining and penalizing enforced or involuntary disappearance
- Citation: Republic Act No. 10353
- Territorial extent: Philippines
- Enacted by: Congress of the Philippines
- Enacted: October 16, 2012
- Signed: December 21, 2012
- Commenced: January 4, 2013

Keywords
- human rights violations, enforced disappearance
- Status: In force

In December 2012, the Anti-Enforced or Involuntary Disappearance Act of 2012 was signed into law by President Benigno Aquino III. The law's principal author in Congress was Rep. Edcel Lagman.

The law is the first law in Asia that makes the crime of enforced disappearance punishable by life imprisonment. It was hailed as a milestone law by Human Rights Watch, which called the law "a testament to the thousands of 'disappearance' victims since the Marcos dictatorship, whose long-suffering families are still searching for justice."

The law treats enforced disappearances as a violation of human rights and a crime separate from kidnapping, serious illegal detention, and murder. Under the law, those guilty of enforced disappearances before the law was passed can still be prosecuted if they continue refusing to disclose the whereabouts of the victim, according to Rep. Neri Colmenares.

== International reports ==
=== Alston UN report ===
Philip Alston submitted his final report on the killings in 2007. He found that members of the Armed Forces of the Philippines were implicated in the killings of left-wing activists and that the killings were linked to counter-insurgency efforts. Alston rejected the Philippine government's claim that communist groups were responsible for the killings as part of an effort to eliminate suspected spies and discredit the government.

In February 2007, Alston stated that the military had denied or provided alibis for its alleged role in about 800 deaths of activists and journalists since 2001. He attributed the killings of journalists and leftist activists in part to impunity, stating that the priorities of the criminal justice system had become increasingly focused on prosecuting civil society leaders rather than their killers. Alston also noted the government's creation of special courts to try extrajudicial killings, the Melo Commission, and the Philippine National Police's Task Force Usig.

In November 2007, the United Nations reported 68 killings that year, down from 209 in 2006. Karapatan's report, however, listed 830 victims of extrajudicial killings since 2001 under Gloria Macapagal Arroyo. In March 2007, the Supreme Court of the Philippines created regional trial courts to hear cases involving killings and disappearances.

=== Failed investigations and prosecutions ===
The United Nations Special Rapporteur on Extrajudicial Execution concluded that accountability mechanisms in the Philippines looked strong "on paper," but Alston expressed concern about the underlying reality. Alston stated that "there is a passivity, bordering on an abdication of responsibility, which affects the way in which key institutions and actors approach their responsibilities in relation to such human rights concerns; prosecutors refused to take a role in gathering evidence and instead were purely passive, waiting for the police to present them with a file; the Ombudsman's office did almost nothing in recent years in this regard, failing to act in any of the 44 complaints alleging extrajudicial executions attributed to state agents submitted from 2002 to 2006."

=== Eric G. John and G. Eugene Martin testimonies ===
On March 14, 2007, Eric G. John, Deputy Assistant Secretary for East Asian and Pacific Affairs, testified before the U.S. Senate Subcommittee on Foreign Relations in Washington, D.C. John submitted a written statement covering the increase in extrajudicial killings; the "Huk Rebellion" in the 1940s and 1950s, which resulted in thousands of deaths; the communist New People's Army (NPA), which was listed in the U.S. State Department list of Foreign Terrorist Organizations and had campaigned to overthrow the government since 1968; extrajudicial killings by security forces, the NPA, and others during the Marcos regime; and the report of UN Special Rapporteur Alston. The statement noted the Philippine government's recognition of the gravity of the problem and expressed concern about the views of the Armed Forces of the Philippines (AFP) regarding the killings, while also stating that the reforms undertaken would not resolve the killings.

Alston's March report stated that resources and technical expertise could partly address the killings, but warned that such measures could treat only some of the symptoms of the crisis without addressing two of its underlying causes. Alston identified these causes as the "vilification," "labeling," or "guilt by association" of groups on the left of the political spectrum, which he said resulted in them being characterized as "front organizations" for armed groups and treated as legitimate targets, and the extent to which the government's counter-insurgency strategy facilitated the killings of activists and others.

G. Eugene Martin expanded on the causes of the violence and killings, identifying weak political and social institutions and a corrupt and ineffective judicial system, as well as the legacy of the Ferdinand Marcos regime. He linked Martial law to a system in which soldiers, police, judges, and prosecutors became involved in offenses such as extralegal arrest, detention, incarceration, disappearances, and killings, or "salvaging." He traced the violence and killings to political instability during the government of Gloria Macapagal Arroyo. Although Arroyo created the Independent Commission to Address Media and Activist Killings, also known as the Melo Commission, Martin stated that she lacked the political capacity to end the killings as a result of the 2004 election controversy.

=== FIDH report ===
In August 2007, three experts from the International Federation for Human Rights (FIDH), Nabeel Rajab (Bahrain), Mouloud Boumghar (France), and Frédéric Ceuppens (Belgium), visited the Philippines. Their FIDH mission report stated that torture and ill-treatment were widespread among suspected "terrorists." The report noted that the Philippine government was a signatory to the International Covenant on Civil and Political Rights (ICCPR) and the Convention against Torture (CAT). FIDH questioned the effectiveness of the mechanisms established by the Philippine government to address the killings, citing concerns about the efficiency of the judiciary and the government's Witness Protection Program. It also noted that judges and lawyers had themselves been victims of killings. The report concluded that the Philippine anti-terrorism law, the Human Security Act, had contributed to torture and extrajudicial killings rather than effectively combating terrorism.

=== 2008 US Department of State report ===
In March 2008, the United States Department of State reported that "arbitrary, unlawful arrests and extrajudicial and political killings continued to be a major problem in the Philippines in 2007." It also stated that "many of these killings went unsolved and unpunished despite intensified efforts of the government to investigate and prosecute these cases."

=== Maguindanao massacre ===
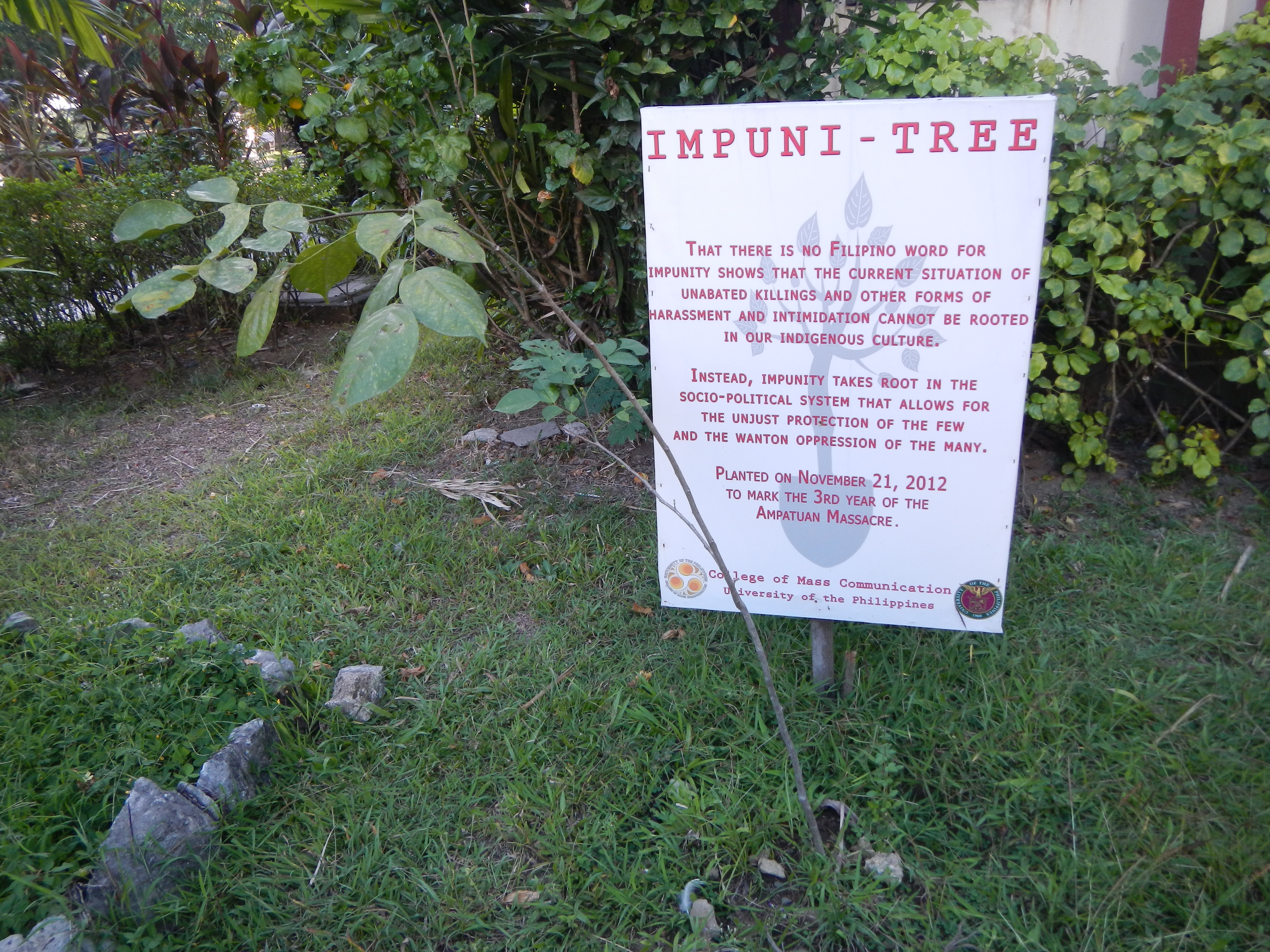
Symbolic 'Impuni-tree' planted for 3rd anniversary of Maguindanao massacre (University of the Philippines College of Mass Communication, UP Diliman).

In the Maguindanao massacre in the Philippines on November 23, 2009, 57 people were killed while en route to file an electoral certificate of candidacy for Esmael Mangudadatu, vice mayor of Buluan, in the upcoming gubernatorial elections for Maguindanao province. The dead included Mangudadatu's wife, his two sisters, journalists, lawyers, aides, and motorists who were witnesses. At least 198 suspects were charged with murder, including incumbent governor Andal Ampatuan Sr. and his son, Andal Ampatuan Jr., who was to be a candidate to succeed him. On November 16, 2010, the international non-governmental organization Human Rights Watch issued a 96-page report titled "They Own the People," which documented the Ampatuans' rise to power, including their use of violence to expand their control and eliminate threats to the family's rule.

=== Rodrigo Duterte's war on drugs ===
President Rodrigo Duterte won the 2016 Philippine presidential election after campaigning on promises to kill people involved in crime and illegal drugs. He reiterated such statements during his term in office. On July 3, 2016, the Philippine National Police said that its officers had killed 30 alleged drug dealers since Duterte was sworn in as president on June 30. The police later stated that they had killed 103 suspects between May 10 and July 7.

On August 26, 2016, the reported official death toll reached 2,000. Official records from the Philippine Drug Enforcement Agency put the number of deaths from the anti-drug campaign between July 2016 and May 2022 at more than 6,200. Human rights groups have estimated the number of killings at 30,000, including vigilante-style killings.

The Philippine National Police and Interpol arrested Duterte on March 11, 2025, in connection with charges of crimes against humanity related to extrajudicial killings during the Philippine drug war. Duterte was subsequently brought before the International Criminal Court in The Hague.

== Events ==
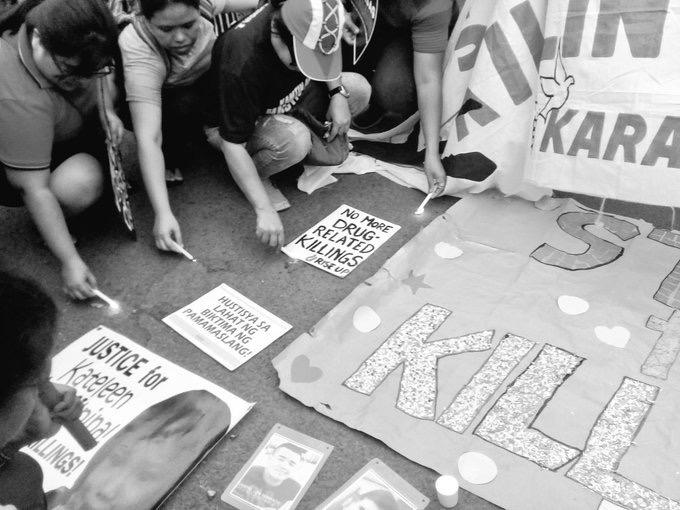
A protest by local human rights groups, remembering the victims of the drug war, October 2019.

On February 27, 2007, U.S. ambassador to the Philippines Kristie Kenney called on President Arroyo to end these extrajudicial killings: "Let's beef up the human rights in the Armed Forces of the Philippines and make every effort to investigate, prosecute those responsible, [and] exonerate the innocent." In August 2007, the International Day of the Disappeared, the Asian Human Rights Commission (AHRC) ranked the Philippines among the top eight countries in Asia where forced disappearances of activists are not just rampant but are done with impunity. Sri Lanka headed the list. The activists took part in the Human Rights School Session of the AHRC for 2007.

In September 2007, Marie Hilao-Enriquez, Karapatan secretary-general, formally petitioned the United Nations Human Rights Council (UNHRC) to direct the Philippine government to stop the extrajudicial killings. She filed the report on 60 cases of killings recorded by Karapatan from January to June 2007 alone, with 17 cases of disappearances, 12 of torture, and 113 of illegal arrests.

On October 3, 2007, in Tarlac City, 69-year-old Bishop Alberto Ramento of the Iglesia Filipina Independiente, or Philippine Independent Church, and a vocal critic of killings under the Arroyo government, was stabbed 7 times and killed. Then on December 11, 2006, the Philippines National Police's Task Force Usig reported 115 cases of “slain party list / militant members” and 26 cases of “mediamen” since 2001. The Philippine Daily Inquirer published 299 killings from October 2001 and April 2007 (See e.g. Alcuin Papa, “3 US solons to PNP: Respect human rights,” Philippine Daily Inquirer, April 18, 2007).

The December 2007 year-end report of Karapatan (Alliance for the Advancement of People's Rights) noted only 68 extrajudicial killings compared to 209 victims in 2006. Karapatan also reported 16,307 human rights violations just for 2007 (which included killings and forcible displacement of communities). Therefore, aside from the 887 killings since 2001 under Mrs. Arroyo, Karapatan, just for 2007, recorded 35 victims of political killings; 26 of enforced or involuntary disappearance; 8 of abduction; 29 of torture; 129 of illegal arrest; 116 of illegal detention; 330 of threat, harassment, and intimidation; 7,542 of forcible evacuation or displacement; and 3,600 of “hamletting,” inter alia. As the only solution, it petitioned for the resignation of Mrs. Arroyo with 356 left-wing activists murdered.

The Philippines' armed forces have battled the Communists since 1969, with about 40,000 victims killed, and they had to ward off killings by Muslim radicals. However, Justice Undersecretary Ricardo Blancaflor, head of Task Force on Political Violence, contradicted Karapatan's submission only on the number of killings. PNP's Task Force Usig, according to Blancaflor, noted only 141 cases, of which only 114 are party-list members or leftist activists.

On December 13, 2007, Philippine Human Rights Commissioner Dominador Calamba II, at the Philippine Working Group for an ASEAN Human Rights Mechanism forum, denounced the failure of the government in its treaty reporting to the United Nations, due to "13 reports overdue," reports due on the implementation of international covenants signed by the Philippines to solve discrimination, forced disappearances, and extrajudicial killings. Calamba reported 383 killings filed with the CHR, of which 145 were extrajudicial or political in form.

On January 1, 2008, the National Union of Journalists (NUJ) paid tribute to 171 journalists killed in 2007. Citing data published by the International Federation of Journalists: Iraq was number one, with 65 deaths; in the Philippines, 6 journalists killed in 2007 were Hernani Pastolero (Sultan Kudarat), Carmelito Palacios (Nueva Ecija), Dodie Nunez (Cavite), Geruncio "Oscar" Mondejar (Mandaue), Vicente Sumalpong (Tawi-Tawi), and Fernando "Batman" Lintuan (Davao City); 54 journalists were murdered under the administration of President Gloria Macapagal Arroyo. In 2006, INSI stated that the Philippines was the 2nd most dangerous country for journalists, next to Iraq, listing 15 work-related journalists murdered.

On January 4, 2008, the International Federation of Journalists (IFJ) Asia-Pacific director Jacqueline Park denounced the murders of broadcasters Fernando Lintuan in Davao City and former journalist Romelito Oval Jr. It petitioned the Philippine government to fully investigate the 2007 journalists' killings: "5 journalists as well as Oval were killed in the Philippines in 2007, which is shocking and reveals the extreme dangers that journalists face every day in trying to carry out their work. There will be no press freedom in the Philippines until this (situation) changes."

On January 4, 2008, Anakpawis Rep. Crispin Beltran filed House Resolution 299 with the House of Representatives of the Philippines to investigate the murders and harassment of trade union/labor leaders in the Philippines. He cited the 2007 annual Survey of Trade Union Rights Violations of the International Trade Union Confederation: "33 of the total 144 cases of trade union killings worldwide happened in the Philippines; and there were 800 cases of beatings and torture of trade unionists in the country." On January 9, 2008, PNP Task Force Usig announced that 3 policemen, 11 soldiers, and 3 militiamen had been arrested or named suspects in killings of journalists and militants since 2001. Director Jefferson P. Soriano submitted the report with the 17 names to PNP chief Avelino Razon. As of December 10, Task Force Usig had prosecuted 113 cases of killings of party-list members, leftist activists, and 27 journalists.

Despite different appeals by local and international groups, the spate of extrajudicial killings in the Philippines continued. On January 15, 2008, Chief Justice Reynato Puno condemned the murder of Calbayog, Samar, Judge Roberto Navidad, the 14th judge to be ambushed under the Arroyo government. While starting his vehicle, Natividad was shot in the left eye on January 14, 2008, by a lone gunman using a .45 caliber pistol.

On January 15, 2008, Catholic missionary Rey Roda, Oblates of Mary Immaculate (OMI), 54, was shot dead when he resisted an abduction attempt by 10 unidentified armed men in a chapel in Likud Tabawan village, South Ubian, Tawi-Tawi. In February 1997, another OMI leader, Bishop Benjamin de Jesus, was shot dead in front of the Jolo cathedral. In 2006, the Asian Human Rights Commission stated that there had been 26 priests, pastors, and church workers who were executed or were victims of violence under the Gloria Macapagal Arroyo administration since 2001. This includes 3 priests who were reported killed just in 2007: Basilio Bautista of the Iglesia Filipina Reform Group in Surigao del Sur; Indonesian priest Fransiskus Madhu in Kalinga province; and Catholic priest Florante Rigonan in Ilocos Norte.

On January 19, 2008, the Catholic Bishops Conference of the Philippines (quoting from a letter of Vatican Secretary of State Cardinal Tarcisio Bertone) announced that Pope Benedict XVI "praised the courage of and was saddened over the brutal and tragic killing of Fr. Reynaldo Roda in his ministry as head of Notre Dame School." The Pope wrote to Jolo Bishop Angelito Lampon: "calls upon the perpetrators to renounce the ways of violence and to play their part in building a just and peaceful society, where all can live together in harmony."

On January 16, 2008, international democracy watchdog Freedom House downgraded the "freedom status" of the Philippines to partially free due to the spate of political killings, specifically targeting left-wing political activists in the country. On January 18, 2008, the Kilusang Magbubukid ng Pilipinas (KMP), led by its chair Rafael Mariano (president of the Anakpawis), condemned the January 12 kidnapping and January 16 extrajudicial killing and torture of their farmer and local leader Teldo Rebamonte, 45, Masbate People's Organization (who was supposed to join the commemoration of the Mendiola Massacre) in Barangay Nabasagan, Concepcion in Claveria, Burias Island, Masbate.

On January 23, Karapatan announced that the two latest victims of extrajudicial killings were: Tildo Rebamonte, 45, a Claveria, Masbate, carpenter, who was gunned down on January 16, four days after he was allegedly kidnapped by the Philippine National Police's Regional Mobile Group; and ex-political prisoner Ronald Sendrijas, 35, who was shot dead in Tagbilaran City, Bohol, on January 17. On January 23, 2008, Pastor Felicisimo Catambis, 60, of the United Church of Christ in the Philippines in Catugan, Barangay Balucawe, Leyte, was shot dead by an unknown assailant.

In March 2008, Filipino lawyer Edre Olalia, lead officer of the National Union of Peoples’ Lawyers and the Counsels for the Defense of Liberties, brought the Philippine case and appealed to the United Nations Human Rights Council (UNHRC) in its 7th Geneva session "to stop the extrajudicial killings and abductions in the Philippines." Philippine killings will be examined in the first UNHRC session, a periodic review from April 7 to 18, along with those in 15 others of 192 member countries.

In the March 2008 US Department of State 2007 Country Reports on Human Rights Practices, the US found that extrajudicial and political killings, including those of journalists, by members of the military, police, Communist rebels, and other terrorist groups/perpetrators continue to be a major problem in the Philippines. The report added that "despite intensified efforts by the Philippine government to investigate and prosecute these cases, many went unsolved and unpunished."

In 2008, the delegates to the 6th Congress of the National Union of Journalists of the Philippines (NUJP), led by Chairperson Jose Torres Jr., renewed calls to end unabated media killings. The NUJP reported that the number of journalists murdered swelled from 60 in 2001 to 96 in 2008. The most recent gunned-down victims were local radio broadcasters of Radio Mindanao Network, Dennis Cuesta from General Santos, and Martin Roxas of Roxas City, Capiz. The NUJP declared August 20 a "National Day of Mourning" as journalists wore black in protest as they paid tribute to slain media practitioners at the Bantayog ng mga Bayani in Quezon City.

In 2013, Deepak Obhrai, Parliamentary Secretary to the Minister of Foreign Affairs, in a statement at Canada's House of Commons, commended "the laudable role of the Supreme Court in the preservation of human rights and in the pursuit of justice." Canadian Ambassador Robert Desjanis sent the document to Chief Justice Reynato Puno "to underline the value that the government of Canada attaches to your efforts in this regard as well as to our continued collaboration in the Justice Reform Initiatives Support Project."

In 2018, Major General Jovito Palparan was convicted for the kidnapping and disappearance of Sherlyn Cadapan and Karen Empeño.

In April 2023, Indigenous rights activists Dexter Capuyan and Gene Roz Jamil "Bazoo" de Jesus were abducted by unidentified men in Rizal province and have not yet been found. In September 2023, environmental activists Jonila Castro and Jhed Tamano were held for two weeks by the Philippine military in Bataan province. The military allegedly abducted and coerced Castro and Tamano into posing as members of the New People's Army. According to Karapatan, at least 16 activists were abducted from June 2022 to November 2023 under the presidency of Bongbong Marcos

== In popular culture ==
In June 2019, Watch List (Maria), a feature film thriller directed by Ben Rekhi about a single mother and recovering drug addict who makes a devil's bargain with a police death squad in Manila, premiered and was nominated for a jury prize at the Seattle International Film Festival.

== See also ==
- Davao Death Squad
- Marlene Garcia-Esperat, investigative journalist
- Deaths of Kian delos Santos, Carl Arnaiz and Reynaldo de Guzman
- Red-tagging in the Philippines
- Negros Island killings
