= Androlepsy =

Androlepsy or Androlepsia (Ancient Greek: ἀνδροληψία) or Androlepsion (Ancient Greek: ἀνδρολήψιον), was an ancient Greek legal concept that served as a form of reprisal in cases of homicide. It was recognized by the international law of the Greeks; so that if a citizen of one state killed someone from another state and the perpetrator's country refused to surrender the murderer, the family of the deceased had the right to seize three citizens of the offender's state as hostages. These hostages would remain captive until the murderer was either handed over for justice or satisfaction was otherwise provided. Additionally, the property found on the hostages was confiscated, a practice known as σῦλα or σῦλαι.

This right of reprisals was part of the broader international law in ancient Greece, with commanders and trierarchs often tasked with carrying out the act. It was connected to ancient religious customs surrounding the "avenger of blood," where it was believed that the guilt from a murder was attached to the land where the crime occurred until the killer was either punished or exiled. In cases where the murderer fled to another region, the right of reprisals could prevent the harboring of the murderer, thus enforcing justice.

The concept extended to familial obligations, where the right to seek justice was tied to the inheritance rights of the deceased's relatives, typically limited to second cousins. While there is uncertainty about how the hostages were treated or whether foreigners could be taken as hostages, the principle was rooted in ancient Greek ideas of justice and reparation.

Some scholars describe the Androlepsia as similar to the modern extradition treaties, while others believe that it was part of the ancient jus gentium (meaning the law of nations or international law) and was not based on a formal treaty or agreement between states.

The word is formed of άνήρ, "man", and λαμβάνω, "I take".

Some authors also use androlepsia for reprisals.

The Romans had a similar law called clarigatio.

== See also ==
- Arresto facto super bonis mercatorum alienigenorum
