= Prerogative writ =

Court order directing a government or other court

"Prerogative writ" is a historical term for a writ (official order) that directs the behavior of another arm of government, such as an agency, official, or other court. It was originally available only to the Crown under English law, and reflected the discretionary prerogative and extraordinary power of the monarch. The term may be considered antiquated, and the traditional six comprising writs are often called the extraordinary writs and described as extraordinary remedies.

Six writs are traditionally classified as prerogative writs:

- certiorari, an order by a higher court directing a lower court to send the record in a given case for review;
- habeas corpus, a demand that a prisoner be taken before the court to determine whether there is lawful authority to detain the person;
- mandamus, an order issued by a higher court to compel or to direct a lower court or a government officer to perform mandatory duties correctly;
- prohibition, directing a subordinate to stop doing something the law prohibits;
- procedendo, to send a case from an appellate court to a lower court with an order to proceed to judgment;
- quo warranto, requiring a person to show by what authority they exercise a power.

Additionally, scire facias, one of the extraordinary writs, was once known as a prerogative writ.

== England and Wales ==
The prerogative writs are a means by which the Crown, acting through its courts, effects control over inferior courts or public authorities throughout the kingdom. The writs are issued in the name of the Crown, who is the nominal plaintiff, on behalf of the applicant.

The prerogative writs other than habeas corpus are discretionary remedies, and have been known as prerogative orders in England and Wales since 1938. The writs of quo warranto and procedendo are now obsolete, and the orders of certiorari, mandamus and prohibition are under the new Civil Procedure Rules 1998 known as "quashing orders", "mandatory orders" and "prohibiting orders" respectively.

The writ of habeas corpus is still known by that name.

== India ==
The declaration of fundamental rights would be meaningless unless these rights can be enforced at the instance of the persons on whom they are conferred. The Constitution itself has laid down the following provisions for the enforcement of the fundamental rights.

1. Any act of the executive or of the Legislature which takes away or abridges the fundamental rights shall be void and the courts are empowered to declare such act as void. (Article 13)
2. The Supreme Court and the High Courts are empowered to issue writs for the enforcement of fundamental rights against any authority of the State.

Article 12 has defined "State" to include the Government and Parliament of India, and the Government and Legislature of the States, and all local or other authorities within the territory of India or under the control of the Government of India. The expression "other authorities" has been interpreted to cover even business organisations like LIC and therefore such organisations also are amenable to the writ jurisdiction of the courts.

1. A proceeding under Article 32 is described as a constitutional remedy and the right to bring such proceedings before the Supreme Court is itself a fundamental right.

== Pakistan ==
Article 199 of the Constitution confers wide powers of judicial review on Provincial High Courts in Pakistan. As compared to powers conferred upon the Supreme Court of Pakistan under Article 184(3) of the Constitution, the powers under Article 199 of the Constitution to the High Court are wider and varied.

The orders which a High Court may issue under Article 199 are also known as writs. They are the writs of prohibition, mandamus, certiorari, habeas corpus and quo warranto.

Mr. Justice Rustam Kayani, the former Chief Justice of West Pakistan High Court was a great admirer of the writ jurisdiction. At the time of his installation as Chief Justice in 1958, he emphasised: "Mandamus and Certiorari are flowers of paradise and the whole length and breadth of Pakistan is not wide enough to contain their perfume".

== United States ==
In the United States federal court system, the issuance of writs is authorized by the All Writs Act (28 U.S.C. § 1651). The language of the statute was left deliberately vague in order to allow the courts flexibility in determining what writs are necessary "in aid of their jurisdiction". Use of writs at the trial court level has been greatly curtailed by the adoption of the Federal Rules of Civil Procedure and its state court counterparts, which specify that there is "one form of action".

The Supreme Court of the United States grants certiorari, while most state supreme courts grant review.

Mandamus has been replaced in the United States district courts and many state trial courts by injunction. In the federal system, it is generally available only to the federal courts of appeals, which issue writs of mandamus to lower courts and administrative hearing panels, while some state systems still allow trial courts to issue writs of mandamus or mandate directly to government officials.

Prohibition is also generally limited to appellate courts, who use it to prevent lower courts from exceeding their jurisdiction.
