= Habeas data =

Legal remedy regarding personal freedom of information

Habeas data is a writ and constitutional remedy available in certain nations. The literal translation from Latin of habeas data is "[we command] you have the data", or "you [the data subject] have the data". The remedy varies from country to country, but in general, it is designed to protect, by means of an individual complaint presented to a constitutional court, the data, image, privacy, honour, information self-determination and freedom of information of a person.

Habeas data can be sought by any citizen against any manual or automated data register to find out what information is held about his or her person. That person can request the rectification, update or the destruction of the personal data held. The legal nature of the individual complaint of habeas data is that of voluntary jurisdiction, which means that the person whose privacy is being compromised can be the only one to present it. The courts do not have any power to initiate the process by themselves.

== History ==
Habeas data is an individual complaint filed before a constitutional court and related to the privacy of personal data. The first such complaint is the habeas corpus (which is roughly translated as "[we command] you have the body"). Other individual complaints include the writ of mandamus (USA), amparo (Spain, Mexico and Argentina), and respondeat superior (Taiwan).

The habeas data writ itself has a very short history, but its origins can be traced to certain European legal mechanisms that protected individual privacy. In particular, certain German constitutional rights can be identified as the direct progenitors of the habeas data right. In particular, the right to information self-determination was created by the German constitutional tribunal by interpretation of the existing rights of human dignity and personality. This is a right to know what type of data are stored in manual and automatic databases about an individual, and it implies that there must be transparency on the gathering and processing of such data. The other direct predecessor of the habeas data right is the Council of Europe's 108th Convention on Data Protection of 1981. The purpose of the convention is to secure the privacy of the individual regarding the automated processing of personal data. To achieve this, several rights are given to the individual, including a right to access their personal data held in an automated database.

The first country to implement habeas data was Brazil. In 1988, the Brazilian legislature voted to introduce a new constitution, which included a novel right: the habeas data individual complaint. It is expressed as a full constitutional right under article 5, LXXII, of the constitution.

Following the Brazilian example, Colombia incorporated the habeas data right to its new constitution in 1991. After that, many countries followed suit and adopted the new legal tool in their respective constitutions: Paraguay in 1992, Peru in 1993, Argentina in 1994, and Ecuador in 1996. Between 1999 and 2012, several Latin American countries have enacted data protection laws where the procedure to file an habeas data writ is regulated.

== Implementation ==
- Brazil: The 1988 Brazilian constitution stipulates that: "habeas data shall be granted: a) to ensure the knowledge of information related to the person of the petitioner, contained in records or databanks of government agencies or of agencies of a public character; b) for the correction of data, when the petitioner does not prefer to do so through a confidential process, either judicial or administrative".
- Paraguay: The 1992 Paraguay constitution follows the example set by Brazil, but enhances the protection in several ways. Article 135 of the Paraguayan constitution states: "Everyone may have access to information and data available on himself or assets in official or private registries of a public nature. He is also entitled to know how the information is being used and for what purpose. He may request a competent judge to order the updating, rectification, or destruction of these entries if they are wrong or if they are illegitimately affecting his rights."
- Argentina: the Argentinian version of habeas data is the most complete to date. Article 43 of the constitution, amended in 1994, states that: "Any person shall file this action to obtain information on the data about himself and their purpose, registered in public records or data bases, or in private ones intended to supply information; and in case of false data or discrimination, this action may be filed to request the suppression, rectification, confidentiality or updating of said data. The secret nature of the sources of journalistic information shall not be impaired."
- Philippines: On August 25, 2007, chief justice Reynato Puno announced that the Supreme Court of the Philippines was drafting the writ of habeas data. The new remedy is supposed to compel military and government agents to release information about the desaparecidos and enable access to military and police files. Reynato Puno had previously announced a draft of the writ of amparo, Spanish for protection, which will prevent military officials in judicial proceedings from simply denying cases of disappearances or extrajudicial killings.
- Angola: The Constitution of Angola enacted in 2010 has habeas data included in its Article 69, in similar terms as in the Brazilian text.

== See also ==
- Habeas corpus
- Information privacy
- Privacy
- Privacy law
