= Clarigation =

In ancient Roman international law, a clarigation was a loud, clear call or summons made to an enemy to demand satisfaction for some injury received, without which there would be a declaration of war. Clarigation equates to what the Ancient Greeks called ανδροληψία (androlepsy).
