= Scire facias =

Type of writ in English law

In English law, a writ of scire facias ([ˈʃiː.re ˈfaː.t͡ʃi.as], Latin, lit. 'make known') is a writ founded upon some judicial record directing the sheriff to make the record known to a specified party, and requiring the defendant to show cause why the party bringing the writ should not be able to cite that record in his own interest, or formerly why, in the case of letters patent and grants, the patent or grant should not be annulled and vacated. Largely withdrawn by 1947, its use in the administrative court remains one of the two ways in which a Royal Charter can be involuntarily revoked, the other being primary legislation in Parliament. In the United States, the writ has been abolished under federal law in district courts but may still be available in some state legal systems.

== History ==
The writ of scire facias was created in 1285 during the 13th year of the reign of Edward I by the English Parliament in the Second Statute of Westminster. The writ of quo warranto was created during this same period.

== Procedure ==
Proceedings in scire facias were regarded as a form of action, and the defendant could plead his defense as in an action. They were analogous to quo warranto proceedings.

In 1684, the royal charter of the Massachusetts Bay Colony was rescinded by a writ of scire facias for the colony's interference with the royal prerogative in founding Harvard College and other matters.

By the beginning of the 20th century, the writ was of little practical importance. Its principal uses were to compel the appearance of corporations aggregate in revenue suits, and to enforce judgments against shareholders in companies regulated by the Companies Clauses Act 1845, or similar private acts, and against garnishees in proceedings in foreign attachment in the Lord Mayor's Court. It was not used in Scottish law.

Proceedings by scire facias to repeal letters patent for inventions were abolished by the Patents, Designs and Trademarks Act 1883, and a petition to the court substituted.

The writ in most situations was abolished on 1 January 1948 by the Crown Proceedings Act 1947.

== U.S. significance ==
The actual writ of scire facias has been suspended in the federal district courts by Rule 81(b) of the Federal Rules of Civil Procedure, but the rule still allows for granting relief formerly available through scire facias by prosecuting a civil action. Some American legal scholars, including William Rehnquist, Saikrishna Prakash, and Steven D. Smith, have suggested that impeachment may not be the sole method to remove a federal judge from office, pointing to scire facias as an alternative.

Under the law of many states, Georgia, New Hampshire, Tennessee, and Texas for example, an action in scire facias may be used to revive a dormant judgment if brought in a timely fashion. An action on debt, reciting that the dormant judgment remains unpaid, may be used for the same purpose. The defendant of the scire facias writ would generally need to prove that the debt was paid in order for the court to invalidate the writ. See O.C.G.A. § 9-12-61; Texas Civil Practice & Remedies Code § 31.006.

== See also ==
- Reexamination
