= Asian Human Rights Commission =

Non-governmental organization and advocacy group

- Traditional Chinese: 亞洲人權委員會
- Simplified Chinese: 亚洲人权委员会
Transcriptions
Standard Mandarin
- Hanyu Pinyin: Yàzhōu Rénquán Wěiyuánhuì
Yue: Cantonese
- Jyutping: aa3 zau1 jan4 kyun4 wai2 jyun4 wui6*2

The Asian Human Rights Commission Limited (AHRC) is an independent, non-governmental body that promotes human rights in Asia and mobilizes Asian and international public opinion to obtain relief and redress for the victims of human rights violations. Headquartered in Ho Man Tin, Hong Kong, it was founded in 1984 by a prominent group of jurists and human rights activists in Asia and serves to promote civil and political rights, as well as economic, social and cultural rights.

AHRC endeavours to achieve the following objectives stated in the Asian Charter: "Many Asian states have guarantees of human rights in their constitutions, and many of them have ratified international human rights instruments. However, there continues to be a wide gap between rights enshrined in these documents and the abject reality that denies people of their rights. Asian states must take urgent action to implement the human rights of their citizens and residents."

Its sister organization, the Asian Legal Resource Centre (ALRC), holds General Consultative Status with the United Nations Economic and Social Council (ECOSOC). The AHRC and ALRC are both based in Hong Kong.

== Human rights issues in Asia ==
On the eve of the International Day of the Disappeared in 2007, AHRC ranked the Philippines among the top eight countries in Asia where forced disappearances of activists are not just rampant but are carried out with impunity. Sri Lanka heads the list (statement posted on its website www.ahrchk.net). The activists took part in the Human Rights School Session of the AHRC for 2007. The AHRC listed the other countries where forced disappearances take place with impunity: Pakistan, Indonesia, Bangladesh, Nepal, Thailand, Philippines, and parts of India.

Further, AHRC had evidence to show that Myanmar junta uses broom-wielding gangs or Swan-ar Shin heavies not guns to crush dissent (fuel price protests).

On September 28, 2007, AHRC said that the new Writ of Amparo and Habeas Data (Philippines) in themselves are not enough to resolve the problems of extra-legal killings and enforced disappearances in the Philippines. It said that there must be a cooperative action on all parts of the government and civil society:

Though it responds to practical areas it is still necessary that further action must be taken in addition to this. The legislative bodies, House of Representatives and Senate, should also initiate its own actions promptly and without delay. They must enact laws which ensure protection of rights—laws against torture and enforced disappearance and laws to afford adequate legal remedies to victims.

AHRC also said that protection provided by the writ of amparo does not extend to non-witnesses whose lives may also be threatened.

== See also ==
- Human rights commissions
- International Day in Support of Victims of Torture
