= Writ =

Formal written order issued by an entity

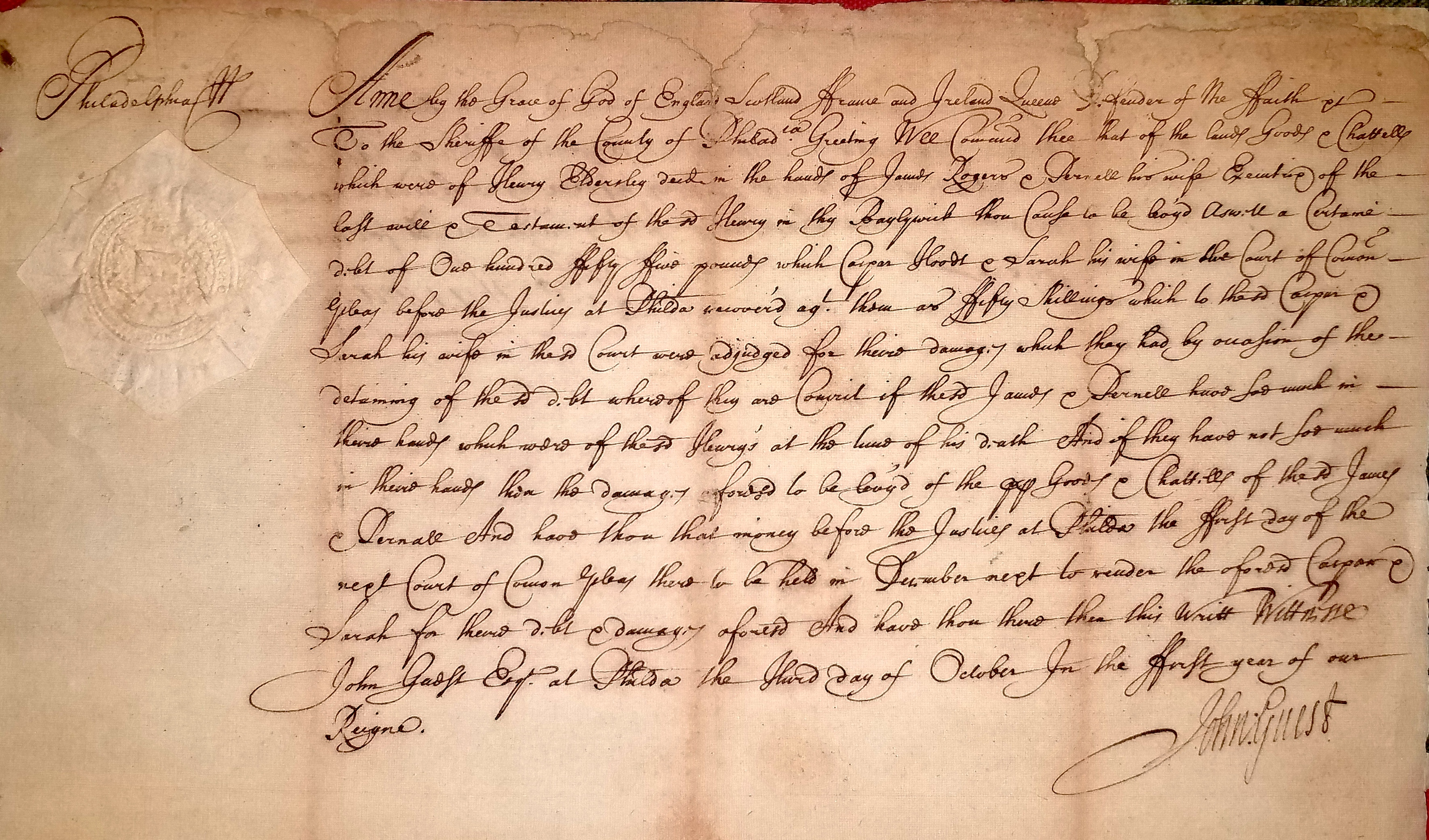
A writ of attachment

In common law, a writ is a formal written order issued by a body with administrative or judicial jurisdiction; in modern usage, this body is generally a court. Warrants, prerogative writs, subpoenas, and certiorari are common types of writs, but many forms exist and have existed.

In its earliest form, a writ was simply a written order made by the English monarch to a specified person to undertake a specified action; for example, in the feudal era, a military summons by the king to one of his tenants-in-chief to appear dressed for battle with retinue at a specific place and time. An early usage survives in the United Kingdom, Canada, Australia, and some other Commonwealth countries in a writ of election, which is a written order issued on behalf of the monarch (in Canada, by the Governor General and, in Australia, by the Governor-General for elections for the House of Representatives, or state governors for state elections) to local officials to hold a general election. Writs were used by the medieval English kings to summon people to Parliament (then consisting primarily of the House of Lords) whose advice was considered valuable or who were particularly influential, and who were thereby deemed to have been created "barons by writ".

== History ==
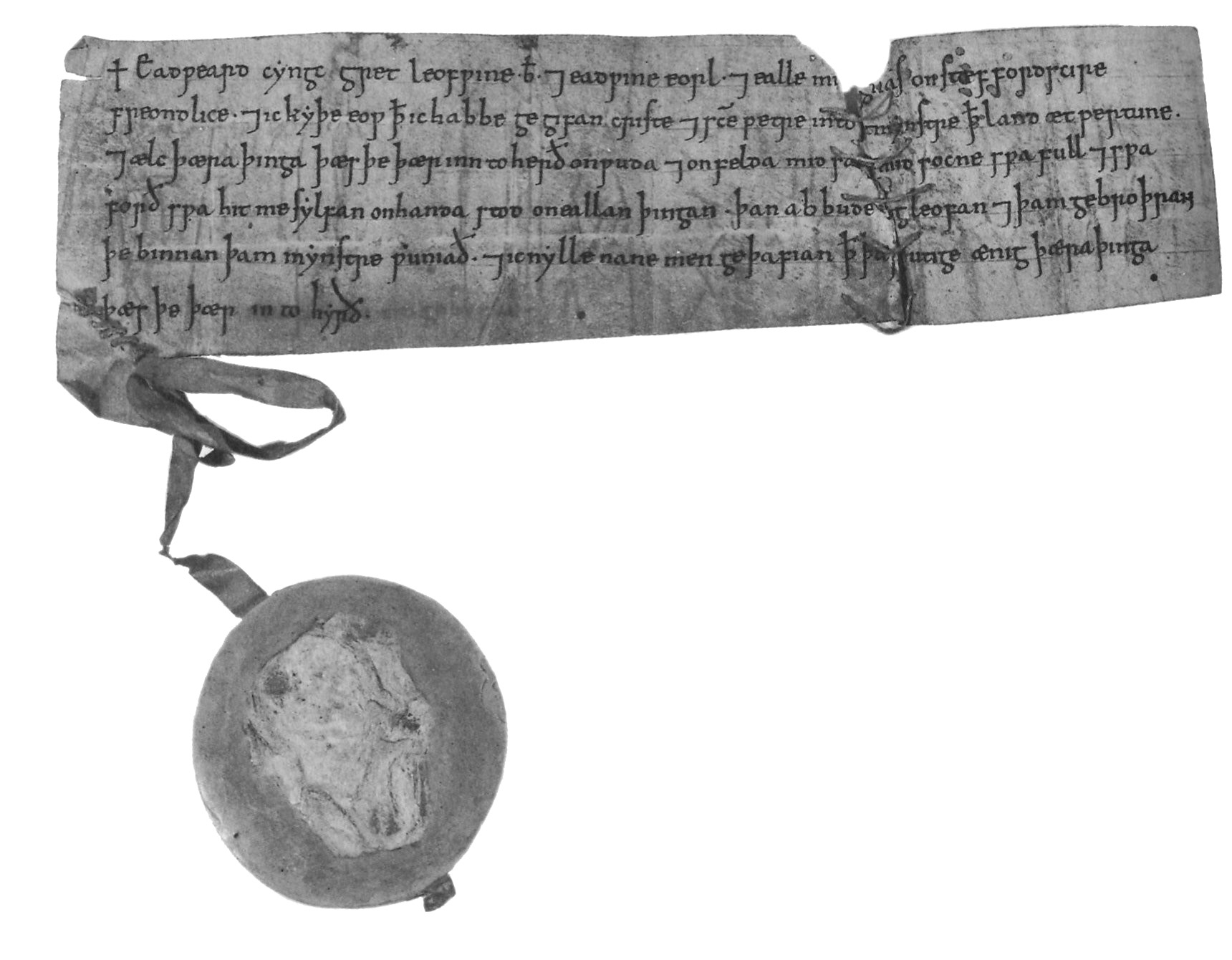
A sealed writ of Edward the Confessor, a king of England who died in 1066 – the same year as the Norman Conquest

=== Origins ===
Sometime before the tenth century, officials in England began utilizing writs to convey orders. A "writ" was simply a short written command issued by a person in authority. It was customary for the sender to seal such a command as proof of its authenticity. In the days when writing was a rare art, a writ was revered because the person receiving the command was unlikely to deny or question its legitimacy. The Norman Conquest of England in 1066 led to the establishment of a strong, centralized monarchy. The first Norman King of England, William the Conqueror, modified writs to become mainly framed in Latin, increased the number of writs to cover additional royal commands, and established the Curia Regis in England. The Curia Regis, a Latin term meaning "royal council", consisted of the King of England and his loyal advisors. The Curia Regis accompanied the King as he travelled. This council administered all of the King's governmental activities, including judicial matters.

One of the most important members of the Curia Regis was the Lord Chancellor. The Lord Chancellor led the chancery. Chancery is a general term for a medieval writing office that was responsible for the production of official documents. The Lord Chancellor wrote writs on behalf of the King, maintained all official documents, and acted as the keeper of the royal seal. This position, in effect, placed the Lord Chancellor as the head of the English legal system. The King, however, was the ultimate leader of the kingdom; therefore, the Lord Chancellor issued writs under the guidance of what he believed to be in the best interests of the King. Between the twelfth and thirteenth centuries, the Lord Chancellor had a large control over the issuance of all original writs. In this history of English common law, original writs began a legal proceeding, while a judicial writ was issued during a legal proceeding.

The writ was a unique development of the Anglo-Saxon monarchy and consisted of a brief administrative order, authenticated (innovatively) by a seal. Written in the vernacular, they generally made a land grant or conveyed instructions to a local court. In the beginning, writs were the documents issued by the King's Chancellor against a landowner whose vassal complained to the King about an injustice, after a first summon by the sheriff to comply had been deemed fruitless. William the Conqueror took over the system unchanged, but was to extend it in two ways: first, writs became mainly framed in Latin, not Anglo-Saxon; second, they covered an increasing range of royal commands and decisions. Writs of instruction continued to develop under his immediate successors, but it was not until Henry II that writs became available for purchase by private individuals seeking justice, thus initiating a vast expansion in their role within the common law.

Writs could take two main forms: 'letters patent', which were open for all to read, and 'letters close' for one or more specified individuals alone.

=== Development ===
The development of writs as a means of commencing a court action was a form of "off-the-shelf" justice designed to enable the English law courts to rapidly process lawsuits by allocating each complaint form into a standard category that could be dealt with by standard procedures. The complainant applied to the court for the writ most relevant to his complaint to be sent to the wrongdoer, which ordered him under royal authority to attend a royal court to answer for his actions. The development was part of the establishment of a Court of Common Pleas, for dealing with commonly made complaints by subjects of the crown, for example: "someone has damaged my property". The previous system of justice at the royal court of Chancery was tailor-made to suit each case and was thus highly time-consuming. Thus eventually the obtaining of a writ became necessary, in most cases, to have a case heard in one of the Royal Courts, such as the King's Bench or Common Pleas. Some franchise courts, especially in the Counties Palatine, had their own system of writs, which often reflected or anticipated the common law writs. The writ was "served" on (delivered in person to) the wrongdoer and acted as a command that he should appear at a specified time and date before the court specified in the writ, or it might command some other act on the part of the recipient.

Where a plaintiff wished to have a case heard by a local court or by the justice of an Eyre if one happened to be visiting the county, there would be no need to obtain a writ. An informal complaint could usually start actions in local courts. However, if a plaintiff wished to avail himself of Royal — and by implication superior — justice in one of the King's courts, then he would need a writ, a command of the King, to enable him to do this. Initially, for common law, recourse to the King's courts was unusual, and something for which a plaintiff would have to pay. For most Royal Courts, the writ would usually have been purchased from the Chancery, although the court of the Exchequer, being, in essence, another government department, could issue its own writs.

While originally writs were exceptional, or at least non-routine devices, Maitland suggests that by the time of King Henry II (1154–1189), the use of writs had become a regular part of the system of royal justice in England.

At first, new writs were drafted to fit each unique situation. However, in practice, the clerks of the Chancery would use wording from previously issued writs, with suitable adjustments, often taken from reference books containing collections of forms of writ, much as in modern times, lawyers frequently use fixed precedents or boilerplate, rather than re-inventing the wording of a new legal document. The problem with this approach was that a plaintiff's rights and available forms of action at his disposal, would be defined, and in most cases limited, by the limited variety of writs available to him. Thus, the power to create new writs was akin to the power to create new rights, a form of extra-parliamentary legislation. Moreover, a writ, if one could be found fitting the plaintiff's case, provided the legal means to remove the dispute from the jurisdiction of the local court, often controlled by a lesser noble, and instead have it heard by the King's judges. The nobility thus saw the creation of new writs as an erosion of their influence.

Over time, opposition to the creation of new writs by the Chancery increased. For example, in 1256, a court was asked to quash a writ as "novel, unheard of, and against reason". Ultimately, in 1258, the King was forced to accept the Provisions of Oxford, which among other things, prohibited the creation of new forms of writ without the sanction of the King's council. New writs were created after that time only by the express sanction of Parliament and the forms of writ remained essentially static, each writ defining a particular form of action. It was the role and expertise of a solicitor to select on his client's behalf the appropriate writ for the proposed legal action. These were purchased from the court by payment of a fee. The solicitor would then hire a barrister to speak for his client in court.

=== Rationalisation of writs ===
With the abolition of the Forms of Action in 1832 and 1833, a profusion of writs was no longer needed, and one uniform writ came into use. After 1852, the need to state the name of the form of action was also abolished. In 1875, the form of writ was altered to conform more to the subpoena used in the Chancery. A writ was a summons from the Crown to the parties to the action, with on its back the substance of the action set out, together with a 'prayer' requesting a remedy from the court (for example, damages). In 1980, the need for writs to be written in the name of the Crown (specifically, with the full name and titles of the sitting monarch) was abolished. This occurred at the insistence of Lord Chancellor Hailsham, who felt that a command from the monarch was too intimidating for ordinary laypeople. From that time forward, a writ simply required the parties to appear.

Writs applied to claims to be heard in one of the courts, eventually forming part of the High Court of Justice. The procedure in a county court, which was established by statute, was to issue a 'summons'.

In 1999, the Woolf Reforms unified most of the procedures of the Supreme Court and the county courts in civil matters. These reforms brought in the Civil Procedure Rules. Under these, almost all civil actions, other than those connected with insolvency, are now commenced by the completion of a 'Claim Form' as opposed to the obtaining of a 'Writ', 'Originating Application', or 'Summons' (see Rules 7 and 8 of the Civil Procedure Rules).

=== List ===
The following writs, amongst others, existed in England:

- Advocatione decimarum was a writ which lay for claiming the fourth part or more of tithes which belong to the church: Reg of Writs, fol 29b. The writ was founded on section 4 of chapter 5 of the Statute of Westminster 1285. It was obsolete by 1876.
- Arrestandis bonis ne dissipentur was a writ which lay for a man whose cattle or goods were taken by another, who was likely, during the controversy, to make away with them, and would hardly have been able to make satisfaction for them afterwards. Reg of Writs 126. Cowel. The writ lay to seize the cattle and goods in the hands of a party, and to hold them during the pendency of a suit, to prevent their being made away with. Reg Orig 126b. In 1816, Williams said the writ lay anciently. Also called bonis arrestandis.
- Arrestando ipsum qui pecuniam recepit was a writ which anciently lay for the apprehension of him who had taken prest money for the king's wars, and afterwards hid himself, when he should have been ready to go. Reg Orig 24. Cowel.
- Arresto facto super bonis mercatorum alienigenorum was a writ that lay for a denizen against the goods of aliens found in the kingdom, as a recompense for goods taken from him in a foreign country after a refusal to restore them. Reg Orig 129; Cowel. The writ was equivalent to clarigatio.
- Attornato faciendo, or de attornato faciendo or atturnato faciendo or attornato recipiendo or dedimus potestatem de attornato faciendo or Attornato faciendo vel recipiendo, was a writ, commanding a sheriff or steward of a county court, or hundred court to receive an attorney for the person taking out the writ, and to admit his appearance by him. Cowel. Sweet said it was the writ dedimus potestatem. In 1760, Wynne said that the writ de attornato faciendo was obsolete.
- Auxilium ad filium militem faciendum et filiam maritandam, or Auxilium ad filium primogenitum militem faciendum, vel ad filiam primogenitam maritandam, was a writ directed to the sheriff of every county where the king or other lord had tenants, to levy of them reasonable aid towards the knighting of his son and the marriage of his eldest daughter. Cowel. No man was entitled to have this writ before his son had attained the age of fifteen years, or his daughter the age of seven years. FNB 82 A; Reg Orig 87; Glanvil, l 9, c 8; Statute of Westminster 1275 c 36. This writ was abolished by the Tenures Abolition Act 1660 (12 Cha. 2. c. 24).
- Ayel, or ayle or de avo or aile or aiel, was a writ which lay for an heir to recover the possession of lands of which a grandfather or grandmother was seized in fee simple on the day of his or her death; and a stranger entered on that day and abated or dispossessed the heir of the inheritance. FNB 221D; 3 Bl Com 186. It was a possessory ancestral writ. 1 Rosc Real Act 127. It was abolished by section 36 of the Real Property Limitation Act 1833 (3 & 4 Will 4 c 27). Ayle was one of a group of writs consisting of ayle, besayle, tresayle, and cosinage.
- Beau pleader, whereby it is provided that no fine shall be taken of anyone in any court for fair pleading, i.e. for not pleading aptly, and to the purpose.
- Chartis reddendis was a writ which lay against him that has charters of feoffment delivered him to be kept, and refuses to deliver them. Old Nat Brev, fol 66. Reg Orig, fol 159. It was a writ of detinue of charters. It had fallen into disuse by 1816 and was obsolete by 1843.

== Writ of election ==
In some Westminster systems, for example Canada and some other parliamentary systems, the phrase 'dropping the writ' refers colloquially to a dissolution of parliament and the beginning of an election campaign to form a new one. This phrase derives from the fact that to hold an election in such a system, a writ of election must be issued on behalf of the monarch ordering the High Sheriffs of each county to set in motion the procedure for elections.

== United States law ==
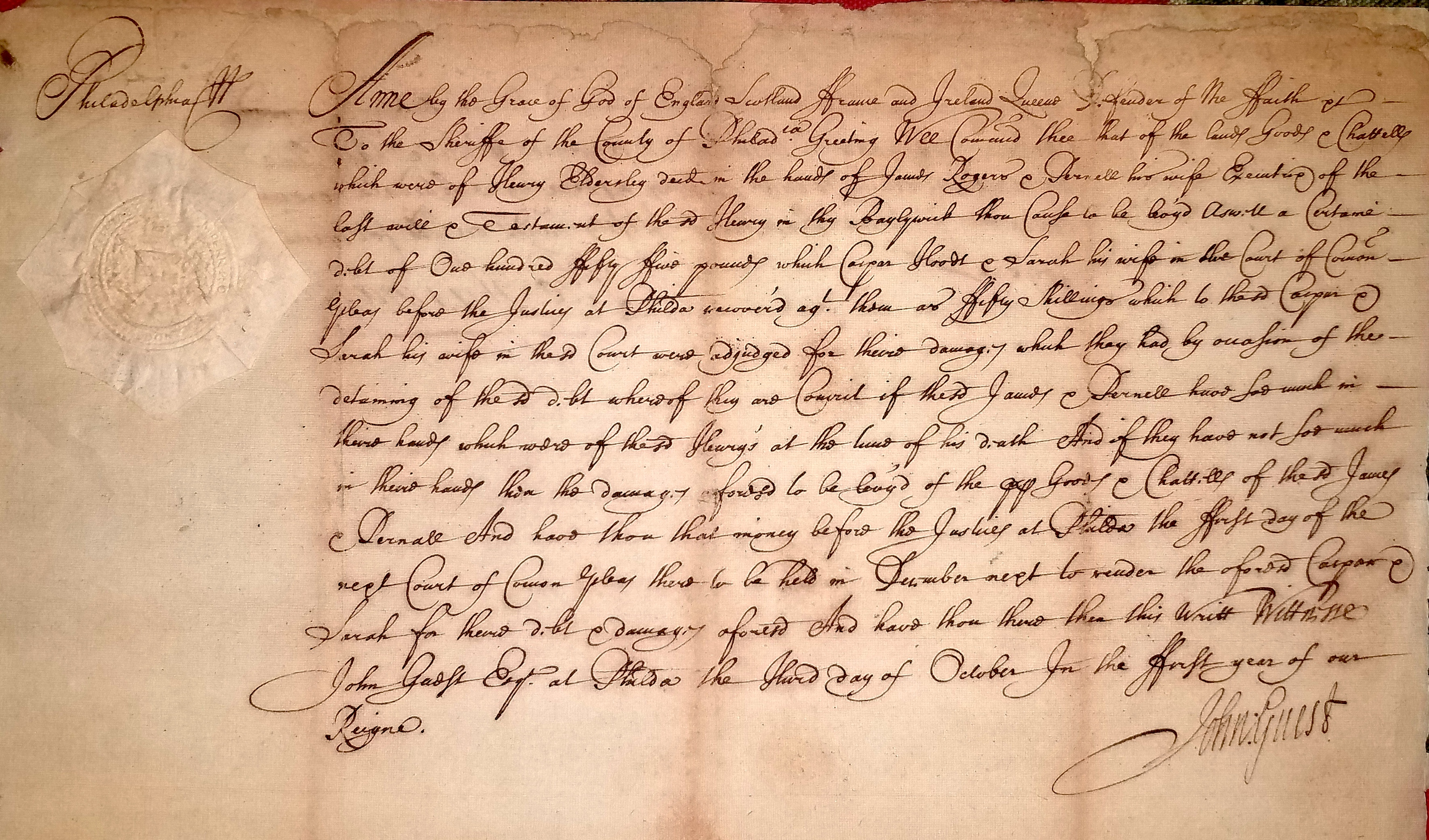
1702 Writ of Attachment signed by Chief Justice John Guest of the Province of Pennsylvania in the name of Queen Anne

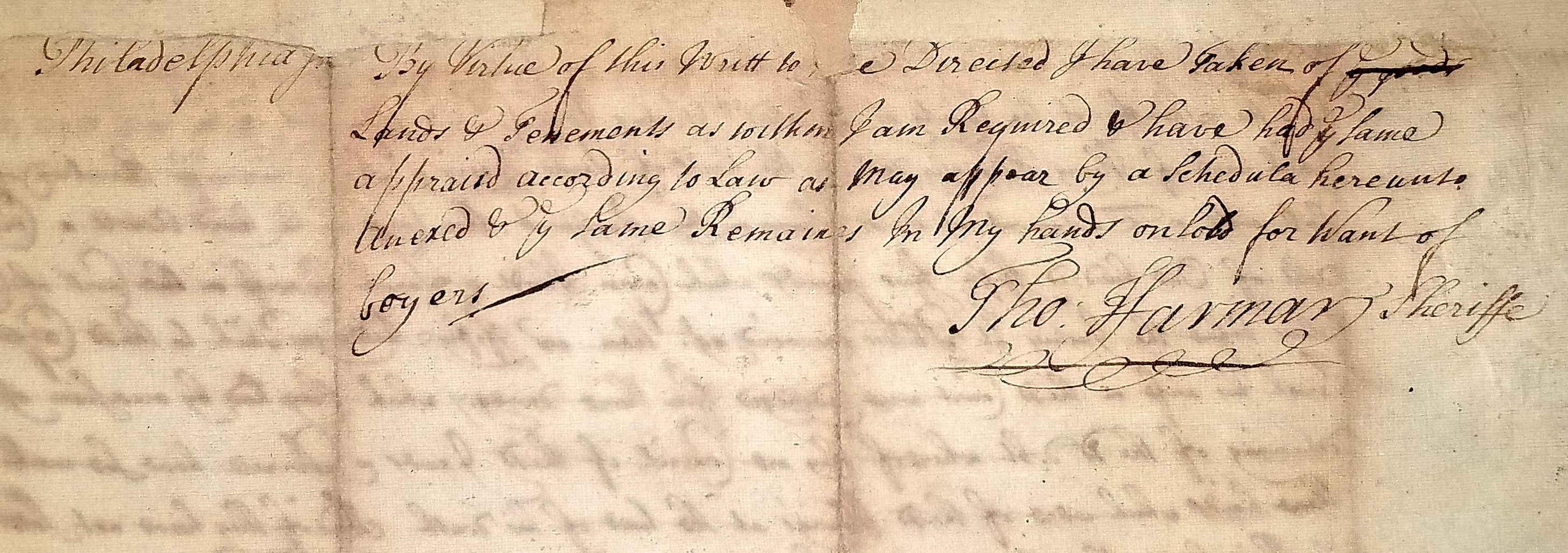
Return of the Writ shown above, endorsed by the Sheriff of Philadelphia, stating that he is still in possession of the attached property for want of a buyer

Early law of the United States adopted the traditional English writ system, in the sense of a rigid set of forms of relief that the law courts were authorized to grant. The All Writs Act authorizes United States federal courts to "issue all writs necessary or appropriate in aid of their respective jurisdictions and agreeable to the usages and principles of law." However, the Federal Rules of Civil Procedure, adopted in 1938 to govern civil procedure in the United States district courts, provide that there is only one form of action in civil cases, and explicitly abolish certain writs by name. Relief formerly available by a writ is now commonly available by a lawsuit (civil action) or a motion in a pending civil action. Nonetheless, a few writs have escaped abolition and remain in current use in the U.S. federal courts:

- The writ of habeas corpus, usually used to test the legality of a prisoner's detention, has expressly been preserved. It is explicitly mentioned in Article I, Section 9, Clause 2 of the Constitution of the United States. In the United States federal courts, the writ is most often used to review the constitutionality of criminal convictions rendered by state courts. The writ's application does not stop there: the Supreme Court has held the writ of habeas corpus open to all individuals held by the federal government, including Guantanamo Bay detainees. See Boumediene v. Bush.
- By statute, the Supreme Court of the United States uses the writ of certiorari to review cases from the United States courts of appeals or the state courts.
- In extraordinary circumstances, the United States courts of appeals can use the common law writ of prohibition under the All Writs Act to control proceedings in the district courts.
- Some courts have held that in rare circumstances in a federal criminal case, a United States district court may use the common law writ of error coram nobis under the All Writs Act to set aside a conviction when no other remedy is available.
- In modern times, the All Writs Act is most commonly used as authority for federal courts to issue injunctions to protect their jurisdiction or effectuate their judgments.

The situation in the courts of the various U.S. states varies from state to state but is often similar to that in the federal courts. Some states continue to use writ procedures, such as quo warranto, that have been abolished as a procedural matter in federal courts.

In an attempt to purge Latin from the language of the law, California law has for many years used the term 'writ of mandate' in place of writ of mandamus and writ of review in place of writ of certiorari.

=== Prerogative writs ===
The "prerogative" writs are a subset of the class of writs, those that are to be heard ahead of any other cases on a court's docket except other such writs. The most common of the other such prerogative writs are habeas corpus, quo warranto, prohibito, mandamus, procedendo, and certiorari.

The due process for 'petitions for' such writs is not simply civil or criminal because they incorporate the presumption of non-authority so that the official who is the respondent has the burden to prove his authority to do or not do something, failing which the court has no discretion but to decide for the petitioner, who may be any person, not just an interested party. In this, they differ from a motion in a civil process in which the burden of proof is on the movant and in which there can be a question of standing.

=== Other writs ===
- A writ of attachment permits the seizure of private property.
- A writ of audita querela inhibits the unconscionable use of a lawful judgment because of matters arising after the judgment.
- A writ of capias directs an officer to take the person named in the writ or order into custody.
- A writ of coram nobis corrects a previous error "of the most fundamental character" to "achieve justice" where "no other remedy" is available, e.g., when a judgment was rendered without full knowledge of the facts.
- A writ of elegit orders the seizure of a portion of a debtor's lands and all his goods (except work animals) towards satisfying a creditor until the debt is paid off.
- A writ of error is issued by an appellate court and directs a lower court of record to submit its record of the case laid for appeal.
- A writ of exigent (or exigend) commands a sheriff to summon a defendant indicted for a felony who had failed to appear in court to deliver himself upon pain of outlawry or forfeiture of his goods.
- A writ of fieri facias (colloquially "fi fa") commands a sheriff to take and auction off enough property from a losing party to pay the debt (plus interest and costs) owed by a judgment debtor.
- A writ of mittimus orders either (1) a court to send its record to another or (2) a jailor to receive the accused in their custody at any point during the investigative or trial process.
- A writ of ne exeat restrains a defendant from fleeing the country or jurisdiction.
- A writ of praemunire instructs a sheriff to order someone to appear in court to answer for several different crimes.
- A writ of scire facias revives a dormant judgment.
- A writ of supersedeas contains a command to stay the proceedings at law.
- A writ of venire facias summons jurors to appear in court.

== Indian law ==
Under the Indian legal system, jurisdiction to issue 'prerogative writs' is given to the Supreme Court of India and the High Courts of Judicature of all Indian states. Parts of the law relating to writs are outlined in the Constitution of India. The Supreme Court, the highest in the country, may issue writs under Article 32 of the Constitution for enforcement of fundamental rights and under Article 139 for enforcement of rights other than fundamental rights, while High Courts, the superior courts of the States, may issue writs under Articles 226. The Constitution broadly provides for five kinds of "prerogative" writs: habeas corpus, certiorari, mandamus, quo warranto and prohibition:

- The writ of prohibition (forbid) is issued by a higher court to a lower court, prohibiting it from taking up a case because it falls outside the jurisdiction of the lower court. Thus, the higher court transfers the case to itself.
- The writ of habeas corpus (to have the body of) is issued to a detaining authority, ordering the detainer to produce the detained person in the issuing court, along with the cause of their detention. If the detention is illegal, the court issues an order to free the person.
- The writ of certiorari (be informed) is issued to a lower court directing that the record of a case be sent up for review, together with all supporting files, evidence, and documents, usually to overrule the judgment of the lower court. It is one of the mechanisms by which the fundamental rights of the citizens are upheld.
- The writ of mandamus (command) is issued to a subordinate court, an officer of the government, or a corporation or other institution commanding the performance of certain acts or duties. But it cannot be issued against a Public Authority for enforcing a Private Contractual Obligation
- The writ of quo warranto (by what authority; under what warrant) is issued against a person who claims or usurps a public office. Through this writ, the court inquires 'by what authority' the person supports their claim.

Recently, the division bench of Rajasthan High Court held that writs cannot be filed as Criminal writs and the constitution of India do not provide for any kind of writ being titled as Criminal writ.

== See also ==
- List of writs

== Bibliography ==
- Maitland F. W. The Forms of Action at Common Law. Cambridge University Press 1962.
- Baker, J. H. An Introduction to English Legal History. Butterworths 1990. ISBN 0-406-53101-3
- Milsom, S. F. C. Historical Foundations of the Common Law (second edition). Butterworths 1981. ISBN 0-406-62503-4
