= List of massacres in the Philippines =

The following is a list of massacres that have occurred in the Philippines.

== Before 1900 ==
Name	Date	Location	Deaths	Notes
Chinese Massacre of 1603	October 1603	Manila, Captaincy General of the Philippines	15,000–25,000	Fearing an uprising by the large Chinese community in the Philippines, the Spanish colonists carried out the massacre, largely in the Manila area.
Chinese Massacre of 1639	1639	Luzon, Captaincy General of the Philippines	17,000–22,000	The Spanish and their Filipino allies carried out a large-scale massacre, in which 17,000 to 22,000 Chinese rebels died.
Chinese Massacre of 1662	1662	Manila	Several thousand	
Cholera massacre	9 October 1820	Manila	39	A cholera epidemic sparked rumors that foreigners were poisoning the water supply, lead to a massacre that saw a mob of about 3,000 men kill Europeans, mostly French, and Chinese nationals.

== 1900s ==
Name	Date	Location	Deaths	Notes
Balangiga massacre	28 September 1901	Balangiga, Eastern Samar	48 (American soldiers)	A mess area was attacked by hundreds of residents led by Valeriano Abanador during the Philippine-American War, marking the US Army's "worst defeat" since the Battle of Little Big Horn in 1876.
Samar Campaign	December 1901 to February 1902	Samar	2,000–50,000 (Filipino soldiers and civilians)	Many Filipino historians argue that the true "Balangiga massacre" was the subsequent American retaliation, which was marked by orders to turn the island of Samar into a "howling wilderness" and the killing of civilians as young as 10 years old who could carry a weapon. Although the original American report claimed that only 39 people were killed, estimates by some historians range from around 2,000 to roughly 50,000.
Malabang incident	12 May 1904	Malabang, Lanao district, Moro Province	53 (all of Filipino families of employees of the American military government stationed in the town)	A band of Moros from the Rio Grande de Mindanao valley, led by a certain Datu Alis, perpetrated the attack.
Moro Crater massacre (Battle of Bud Dajo)	10 March 1906	Jolo Island	600 (figures varied)	Battle between American soldiers and Moro rebels lasted for four days. Only seven were captured including three women and four children. Eighteen men escaped from the mountain.
Iligan incident	Late 1908	Near Iligan, Lanao district, Moro Province	10 (nine laborers and their superintendent)	Reportedly killed by marauders; four others were injured.

== 1920s ==
Name	Date	Location	Deaths	Notes
Cotabato	October 21 1921	Cotabato	12 (including the perpetrator)	A man killed 11 family members with a knife before taking his own life.

== 1930s ==
Name	Date	Location	Deaths	Notes
Malita incident	22-24 February 1932	Malita, Davao	12 (including a municipal vice mayor)	Moros were suspected as perpetrators of the attack. Thirteen others were wounded.
Nagan killings	May-6 June 1937	Nagan, Cagayan	13	Believing his wife had been unfaithful, the husband killed 13 people over a two week period people before being surrounded by authorities on 6 June 1937.

== 1940s ==
Name	Date	Location	Deaths	Notes
Pantingan River massacre (War crime)	12 April 1942	Bagac, Bataan	350–400 (all soldiers)	Victims were killed in a mass execution by the Imperial Japanese Army while on their way from Bagac to Limay during the Bataan Death March.
San Beda Massacres (War crime)	July 1942	Manila	77 (Civilians)	In 1946, Nena Ablan testified during the trial of Gen. Masaharu Homma that she witnessed inside the campus of San Beda College various tortures on Filipinos, such as physical assault using martial arts, sticks, and burning. She also testified some of these civilians were summarily executed by beheading.
Dansalan Massacres (War crime)	August 1942	Dansalan, Lanao	Unknown (Civilians)	A company of Japanese soldiers went to the city and started burning houses. As the population panicked and resisted, the Japanese soldiers started bayoneting and shooting at them. Four Japanese soldiers died as well during the incident.
Pagaeaw-aeaw Tragedy (War crime)	21 October 1942	Banga, Aklan	hundreds (civilians)	Victims were killed when the Japanese entered the town
Taban Massacre (War crime)	17 August 1943	Alimodian, Iloilo	50 (civilians)	A surprise attack on the town's market located in Barrio Taban. The victims were bayoneted and beheaded with sabers.
Mambaling Massacre (War crime)	28 July 1944	Mambaling, Cebu City	Summary execution of 12 civilians (civilians)	On 25 July 1944, Japanese soldiers on patrol were ambushed in Barrio Mambaling. Three days later with the help of Filipino collaborator, Antonio Racaza, the Kempeitai returned to Mambaling, and arrested Vicente Abadiano, Nazario Abadiano, Tereso Sanchez, Fidencio Delgado, and twenty other local male residents whom they suspected were guerrillas. All the men were tortured, and 12 were summarily executed by the Japanese soldiers and Filipino collaborators.
Cordova Assault (War crime)	19 August 1944	Cordova, Cebu	3 beheadings, townsfolk tortured (civilians)	Kempeitai came on shore at Cordova on Mactan Island to round up suspected guerrillas. With the help of Filipino collaborators, they arrested the town mayor, Martin Francisco, and placed the men and women of the town into the Central School building. The women were made to strip, while the men were beaten with baseball bats. Three suspected guerrillas were beheaded by Cpl. Iwao Ishizaka, and Cpl. Muraki.
Shinyō Maru massacre	7 September 1944	off Mindanao, Sulu Sea	668	In an attack on a Japanese convoy by the American submarine USS Paddle, 668 Allied prisoners of war were massacred by the Japanese or killed when their ship, the SS Shinyō Maru was sunk. Only 82 Americans survived and were later rescued.
Massacre at Daanbantayan and Medellin	9 October 1944 to 31 October 1944	Daanbantayan and Medellin, Cebu	multiple people (official number unknown)	
Massacre at Imus and Cavite City	9 October 1944 to 1 February 1945	Imus and Cavite City, Cavite	multiple people (official number unknown)	
Davao Penal Colony Massacre	9 October 1944- 5 February 1945	Davao City	multiple people (official number unknown)	Prisoners of war held at the prison were mistreated, starved and killed without cause or trial
Agdangan Massacre	15 October 1944	Barrio Agdangan, Baao, Camarines Sur	77 Filipino civilians	Japanese soldiers massacred 77 Filipino civilians after a Japanese courier was ambushed in the area.
November North Cemetery Massacre (War crime)	November 1944	Manila North Cemetery	27 (all soldiers)	According to a Filipino-Japanese Fermin Yamasaki, 17 Filipino detainees from the Cortibarte Garrison were brought by Japanese soldiers, 3rd Lt.Tachibana, Sgt. Kataoka, and Pvt. 1st Class Akiyama, and lined up in a hole that was forced dug by 3 Filipinos. The 27 were one by one decapitated by the Japanese.
Northern Cebu massacre	November 1944	Cebu	more than 1000	Unarmed combatants were executed en masse without cause or trial
Lipa executions	November 1944	Lipa, Batangas	11	Eleven US soldiers held as prisoners of war by the Japanese occupiers were tortured and killed without cause or trial
December North Cemetery Massacre	December 1944	Manila North Cemetery	more than 2000	
Massacre at Obando and Polo	10 December 1944	Obando and Polo, Bulacan	~400	
Palawan massacre (War crime)	14 December 1944	Puerto Princesa, Palawan	141 killed 9 wounded	Japanese soldiers, fearing an American landing, herded some 150 Allied prisoners of war into air raid shelters and foxholes wherein most of them were burned alive; those who escaped were shot or bayoneted. Only eleven survived. Majority of the 34 implicated Japanese officers and men were later convicted yet eventually given prison sentences.
Dasmariñas Massacre	16 December 1944	Dasmariñas, Cavite	at least two	
Imus Massacre	16 December 1944	victims taken from Imus and massacred in Manila	all the other male inhabitants of Imus	Physicians as well as all the other male inhabitants of Imus in Cavite, were assembled and taken to the Kempetai Headquarters in Manila
Ponson Island Massacre	29 December 1944	Barrio Dapdap, Ponson, Camotes Islands, Cebu	Conflicting reports: more than 300 killed, more than 50 wounded	Civilians were assembled by the Japanese occupiers near the church, where they proceeded to shoot and bayonet them. It is widely believed that the entire population of the island was either killed or wounded in the incident
San Fernando and San Juan Massacres	19 January 1945	San Fernando and San Juan, La Union	several: 150 from Barrio Negros, San Fernando; 600 from Barrio Dalayap San Fernando; 50 from Barrio Casilogan, San Juan	mistreatment, massacre and rape of civilian women related to suspected guerillas
Mangkaeng massacre	23 January 1945	Guising Norte, Naguilian, La Union	400 (all civilians)	Japanese forces fired at the victims.
San Jose Massacres	23 1945 January -18 March 1945	San Jose, Batangas	109 (Exhibit A of USA vs. Yamashita) 107 killed, 4 injured	The looting and burning of the Taiwan Takosoku, a Japanese controlled warehouse on 23 January prompted the assembly men, women, and children residents at the town plaza by the Japanese occupiers on 27 January for questioning. Having not gotten the information they wanted, they proceeded to arrest the town mayor, the priest, chief of police and court clerk. This commenced the killings, disappearances and burning of property till March. As there was no one witness who saw the entirety of the events that happened, there could have been more victims.
East Tagaytay Massacre	29 January 1945	Tagaytay, Cavite	90 Filipino civilians (all civilians)	As testified by farmer Miguel Ocampo, some 90 civilians were gathered by the Kempeitai at the Padilla residence. They were brought to a ravine not far from the house, and were one by one executed with bolo knives and thrown down the ravine. Ocampo and Elicero Nuestro survived the ordeal.
Manila massacre (War crime)	February to March 1945	Various places in Manila.	At least 100,000	Series of massacres committed by the Imperial Japanese Army during the Battle of Manila.
Cuenca Massacres	3 February - 11 March 1945	Cuenca, Batangas	Conflicting reports: 329 killed; 317 killed, 7 injured	A series of killings and burning of properties committed by Japanese occupiers. As there were no one witness who have seen the entirety of the events that happened, there could have been more victims.
Massacre of Squadron 77	February 1945	Malolos, Bulacan	109 (Hukbalahap guerrillas)	Squadron 77 was returning home from Pampanga and was surrounded by American and Filipino soldiers, disarmed and brought before USAFFE Col. Adonias Maclang, who ordered them shot and buried in a mass grave. Maclang was later appointed mayor of Malolos by US Counter-Intelligence Corps (CIC) officers who approved the executions.
Legarda Street Massacre	5 February 1945	Legarda Street, Manila	47 Japanese Prison Guards	When General Douglas MacArthur directed the 1st Cavalry Division to send a flying column to the University of Santo Tomas to rescue the civilian internees, Japanese prison guards took a last stand at the main building and held 220 hostages. After four days of negotiations brokered through Ernest Stanley, the Japanese were allowed to leave the campus, and join their comrades south towards Malacañang Palace. The Japanese convoy headed by Lt. Col. Toshio Hayashi lost their way, and ended up along Legarda Street, where Filipino guerrillas and civilians ambushed them in retaliation of the massacres that occurred during the Battle of Manila.
Tanauan Massacre	10 February 1945	Tanauan, Batangas	826 killed, 6 injured	Japanese forces assembled Filipino men, women and children near the environs of the Batangas Transportation (B.T.) company where the men were tied. All were either bayoneted, hacked or shot.
Santo Tomas Massacre	11 February 1945	Santo Tomas, Batangas	605 killed, 6 injured	
Pasay District Hospital massacre	11 February 1945	Pasay	numerous	Physicians, patients and refugees were killed by Japanese forces
Calamba Massacre	11- 24 February 1945	Calamba, Laguna	Conflicting reports: ~500 killed, 37 injured	Japanese forces assembled Filipino and Chinese males in the Calamba Church. They were loaded into a truck to be sent to Barrio Real. They were tied, some blindfolded, and bayoneted.
Pax Court massacre	12 February 1945	Pasay	15	Among those of note killed was Associate Justice Antonio Villa-Real, his wife and several foreigners. They were made to kneel while the house was bombed with grenades.
Taal Massacres	16 -18 February 1945	Taal, Batangas	Conflicting reports: 246 killed, 12 injured (Exhibit A of USA vs. Yamashita); ~320 (Prosecution Section Report #90)	Japanese forces committed the atrocities via bayoneting, shooting and burning of houses. A group of civilians who took refuge in a ravine were bombed by hand grenades. As there was no one witness who saw the entirety of the events that happened, there could have been more victims.
Mataasnakahoy Massacres	17 February 1945	Mataasnakahoy, Batangas	~200 noncombatants killed	
San Pablo Massacre	24 February 1945	San Pablo, Laguna	Conflicting reports: ~650 Chinese, ~80 Filipino Civilians; ~702 Filipino and Chinese, 32 injured; ~730 men, women and children	Japanese forces ordered that its 6000-8000 male residents assemble in the San Pablo Cathedral, where around 700 Chinese residents were picked, forced to dig trenches, then bayonetted, some beheaded. Survivors who made the mistake of going to the hospital were killed as well.
Pamintahan Massacre (War Crime)	27 February 1945	Lipa, Batangas	451, including 1 parish priest, and 2 minors (Civilians)	Male residents of barrios Anilao and Antipolo were gathered by Filipino collaborators, Japanese Army officers and enlisted men at a seminary south of Lipa with a promise of being given special travel passes through Japanese-occupied territory. Upon arrival at the Pamintahan Creek, the lured men and were indiscriminately shot at and executed.
Lipa Massacres	17 February- 26 March 1945	Lipa, Batangas	2,298 killed, 11 injured	
Calamba Massacre (War Crime)	27 February 1945	Calamba, Laguna	6,000 (Civilians)	In retaliation for the Allied Raid on Los Baños which rescued internees held by the Japanese military.
Bauan Massacre	28 February 1945	Bauan, Batangas	Conflicting reports: 204 killed, ~70 injured, 34 bayoneted; 101 killed	Japanese occupiers assembled the men in the house of a certain Severino Bautista, others still were assembled in Bauan Church were bombed, killing 204 and injuring ~70. Women and children assembled in Bauan Elementary School, who were presumed to be also murdered that day were spared due to American airplanes flying low which prompted their escape. A further ~34 tried to escape but were bayoneted.
Bayombong Massacre	March 1945	Bayombong, Nueva Vizcaya	29	
Sulac Massacres	5-12 March 1945	Barrio Sulac (Sulok) now Barrio Santa Cruz, Santo Tomas, Batangas	1002 killed, 13 injured	
Los Baños Massacre	6 March 1945	Los Baños, Laguna	22 killed, 2 injured	
Rosario Massacre	13 March 1945	Rosario, Batangas	39 killed	About 15 Japanese soldiers (reports vary), with no apparent reason shot and bayoneted men, women and children that could be found in the town. As there were only four witnesses, all of which did not see the entirety of the events that happened, there could have been more victims.
Cebu Normal School Execution (War Crime)	26 March 1945	Cebu Normal School, Cebu City	5 Filipino civilians, 2 American POWs (Civilians)	As testified by Teodoro Sanchez during the trial of Gen. Tomoyuki Yamashita, five Filipino suspected guerrillas, namely Roberto Tan, Lucente, Castillo, two unnamed, and two captured American airmen, were brought to foxholes at the southeast corner of the campus and beheaded by the Kempetai under Capt. Tsuruyama, Lt. Sakati, Sgt. Higashi, Sgt. Saito and Cpl. Wada.
Famy Massacre	29 March 1945	Famy, Laguna	Numerous	
Paete Massacre	7 April 1945	Paete, Laguna	58	
Pingus (Ping as) Massacre	9 April 1945	Pingus (Ping as), Pakil, Laguna	Conflicting reports: 41; 32	Under the orders of a captain, 60 Japanese soldiers bound and bayoneted men, women and children
Baguio Massacre	13 April 1945	Baguio	83	
Mountain Province Massacres	16 April 1945	Nanipil and vicinity of Titig Mountain, Mountain Province	Numerous	
Batan Island Massacres	10 May 1945; between 1 May-1 September 1945	Batan Island, Batanes	numerous	
Matina Pangi Massacre	10 May 1945	Matina Pangi, Davao City	numerous	
Barrio Tapal Massacre	30 June-4 July 1945	Barrio Tapal, Gonzaga, Cagayan	more than 200 noncombatants killed	
Consuelo Massacre	April 1946	Consuelo, Macabebe, Pampanga	Unknown	Community was shelled by the military believing it to be a hideout of the Huks
Masico Massacre	November 27, 1947	Masico, Pila, Laguna	50-51 (farmers)	Massacred during a dance by soldiers after being suspected as Huks
Ambush of Aurora Quezon, former First Lady of the Philippines	April 28, 1949	Salubsob, Bongabon, Nueva Ecija	12	Waylaid and ambushed by Huk guerrillas. Among the dead were Mrs. Quezon's daughter, son-in-law, driver and military escorts as well as Ponciano Bernardo, Mayor of Quezon City

== 1950s ==
Name	Date	Location	Deaths	Notes
Panampunan Massacre	January 3, 1950	Panampunan,Tarlac, Tarlac	11	Victims killed by soldiers trying to cover up the accidental death of one companion during an anti-Huk operation
Maliwalu massacre	April 7, 1950	Maliwalu, Bacolor, Pampanga	21 (all farmers)	Occurred on Good Friday, victims were executed allegedly as "revenge" for the death of a military captain Nonong Serrano said to be a leader of the private army working for Pampanga governor Jose B. Lingad, and was reportedly killed by Hukbalahap members in the same place. This caused Lingad to lose his reelection bid in 1951.
Camp Macabulos massacre	26 August 1950	Camp Macabulos, Tarlac, Tarlac	40 (23 soldiers, 17 civilians)	Huk attack on army barracks
Maragondon massacre	September 1952	Maragondon, Cavite	4 (Municipal mayor, police chief, 2 policemen)	Allegedly on the orders of Senator Justiniano Montano, from the victim's rival political party, Leonardo Manecio (Nardong Putik), his alleged hired killer, and his henchmen kidnapped mayor Severino Rillo and stabbed him to death along with the town's police chief and his officers. The involved, the senator and his men including Manecio, the vice mayor and two councilors, were accused and charged of the killings. Manecio was later convicted, but the senator was acquitted.
Banga killings	≤13 November 1952	Banga, Aklan	11	A man wielding a bolo knife kills 12 people and injuries 4 in five homes before being shot. It is unclear if he was killed.
1956 San Nicolas murders	11 October 1956	San Nicolas, Roxas, Palawan	16	Domingo Salazar suspected his wife of cheating on him which resulted in him killing her and two other family members before running amok through San Nicolas, killing a further 13 while wounding 1.

== 1960s ==
Name	Date	Location	Deaths	Notes
RCA Building incident	26 August 1963	RCA Bldg., Canonigo St., Paco, Manila	5 (security guards of the RCA Bldg.)	Victims were killed by a gang using a fireman's axe during a robbery; another guard and a carpenter survived. It was found to be an inside job involving 4 employees, with another guard Apolonio Adriano as the killer; they were convicted and sentenced to death in 1966.
Culatingan massacre	13 June 1966	Culatingan, Concepcion, Tarlac	5 (all farmers)	Three Philippine Constabulary (PC) agents shot seven farmers; two of them survived. Authorities said that they were Huk members engaged in battle with them, but the town vice mayor, as well as the survivors, contradicted this claim. Then Tarlac Governor Benigno Aquino Jr., actively involved in the investigation, blamed the PC for the murders, marking his first confrontation with President Ferdinand Marcos.
Lapiang Malaya massacre (Bloody Sunday)	21 May 1967	Taft Avenue, Pasay	33 (32 were farmers from Southern Luzon)	Bolo-wielding members of the Lapiang Malaya (Freedom Movement) marched to Malacañang Palace to hold a rally, but were attacked on the way by police armed with rifles; 358 more were arrested and taken to Camp Crame in Quezon City.
Jabidah massacre	18 March 1968	Corregidor Island	11 (figures varied: claims from a sole survivor, student activists, CMFR & MNLF)	Muslim youth trained for "Operation Merdeka" were allegedly shot by their training officers. The massacre served as a catalyst for the Moro conflict.
Libacao incident	13 May 1969	Libacao, Aklan	18 (all tribesmen)	A tribal village was attacked and looted by rival tribesmen armed with jungle knives.
Tarlac incident	8 October 1969	Between Capas, and Camp O'Donnell, Tarlac.	10 (civilian security guards of the US Naval radio station, driver)	Victims were shot while on their transport vehicle.

== 1970s ==
Name	Date	Location	Deaths	Notes
Paraiso Massacre	24 June 1970	Paraiso, Tarlac, Tarlac	8 (barangay officials, driver)	Attack by Huks on a convoy
San Marcelino Massacre	18 September 1970	San Marcelino, Zambales	12	Attack by Huks on the Mayor's residence
Manili massacre	19 June 19, 1971	Manili, Carmen, North Cotabato	70 (all civilians)	Muslim villagers were killed by soldiers inside a mosque.
Tacub massacre	24 October 1971	Magsaysay, Lanao del Norte	40-66	
Zamboanga City Massacre	5 September 1974	Zamboanga City	28	Five raiders described as Christians, armed with bolo knives and automatic rifles, raided an upland settlement and killed Muslims.
Malisbong (Palimbang) massacre	24 September 1974	Malisbong, Palimbang, Sultan Kudarat	1,000–1,500 (figures varied; all civilians)	Government forces burned the entire village with 300 houses, Moro men were shot inside Tacbil mosque, women and children were arrested and detained, some of them were tortured. Victims were recognized by the government in 2014.
Maimbung ambush	16 January 1975	Maimbung, Sulu	41	Muslim rebels wiped out a military patrol
Wao Massacre	8 August 1975	Wao, Lanao del Sur	32	Muslim rebels ambushed a truck carrying 34 civilians, killed one, tied the rest together and took them to a village in Bukidnon, where they were gunned down. Two survived.
New Calamba Massacre	19 February 1976	New Calamba, Kalawit, Zamboanga del Norte	21	Muslim rebels ambushed a bus carrying more than 50 people
Bingcul massacre	1977	Bingcul village, somewhere in Mindanao	42 (all civilians)	Four survived. As the National Bureau of Investigation disclosed the incident in 1980, murder charges were recommended against seven government militiamen who allegedly killed Muslim villagers and burned down their homes.
Tictapul incident	1977	Tictapul, Zamboanga City	60-Several Hundred (all civilians)	A local Catholic priest stated the army burned the town after giving residents a few hours to move out. He said 60 to 600 people had probably been killed and only a mosque and a school were left standing. Laisa Masuhud Alamia, a survivor, claimed 400 were killed, including several Christian families.
Patikul massacre	10 October 1977	Patikul, Sulu	35 (all soldiers)	The victims, including Brig. Gen. Teodulfo Bautista, commanding general of the 1st Infantry "Tabak" Division of the Philippine Army, were tricked into attending a "peace dialogue" with a group of MNLF rebels led by Usman Sali and were then ambushed and killed.
Buluan incident	16 July 1978	Buluan, Maguindanao	9 (all civilians)	Soldiers shot some 15 farmers working in a field.

== 1980s ==
Name	Date	Location	Deaths	Notes
Kabankalan Killings	March 1980	Marcopa, Kabankalan, Negros Occidental	8	Peasants arrested by the military and later found buried in a farm owned by the town mayor in September
Bongao Massacre	April 1980	Bongao, Tawi-Tawi	29	Philippine marines massacred them during the Moro rebellion. Motive unknown.
Pata Island massacre	12 February 1981	Pata, Sulu	124 (government forces)	Government soldiers were ambushed by Muslim rebels before supposed peace talks in retaliation for the theft of jewelry by soldiers while villagers were at prayer in the mosque; at that time, the worst attack since 1974 and the worst defeat on their side. Sources, however, tagged the retaliation as a real massacre, wherein 3,000 Tausug civilians were killed in an operation launched by the military.
Daet massacre	14 June 1981	Daet, Camarines Norte	4 (all civilians)	Marching protesters were fired upon by soldiers; more than 40 were wounded.
Beberon Killings	23 August 1981	Beberon, San Fernando, Camarines Sur	3	Farmers abducted and killed by soldiers
Tudela incident (Family murders)	24 August 1981	Sitio Gitason, Brgy. Lampasan, Tudela, Misamis Occidental	10 (family members)	Paramilitary members of a quasi-religious sect called Rock Christ attacked the Gumapon residence with 12 persons inside.
Sag-od massacre	15 September 1981	Barrio Sag-od, Las Navas, Northern Samar	45 (all civilians)	Eighteen armed men identified with the Special Forces–Integrated Civilian Home Defense Forces, consisting of security guards of a logging company and paramilitary forces, gathered residents out of their homes and shot them in groups; also burned some of them, and looted the village which later declared inhabitable for sometime since survivors were unable to return due to fear of being killed by perpetrators.
Culasi incident	19 December 1981	Culasi, Antique	5 (all farmers)	Philippine Constabulary forces fired at a group of at least 400 marching residents while on the bridge; several were injured.
Bato incident	25 December 1981	Bato, Camarines Sur	14	NPA ambush on a government vehicle
Talugtug incident	3 January 1982	Talugtug, Nueva Ecija	5 (all civilians)	Victims were gathered by the military. They were found dead a day later.
Dumingag incident	February 1982	Dumingag, Zamboanga del Sur	12 (all civilians)	Members of Ilaga cult killed the victims in retaliation for the death of their leader.
Gapan incident (Family murders)	12 February 1982	Gapan, Nueva Ecija	5 (family members: couple, 3 children)	Men in camouflage attacked Bautista family's house.
Hinunangan incident	23 March 1982	Masaymon, Hinunangan, Southern Leyte	8 (all civilians, 6 were aged 3–18)	Members of the Orillo family killed by soldiers.
Bayog incident	25 May – June 1982	Dimalinao, Bayog, Zamboanga del Sur	5 (all civilians)	In retaliation for the death of 23 soldiers on 23 May, the military launched airstrikes on the village, killing 3. Victims were picked up days later, on 30 May and 18 June, then killed. It was followed by an attack on the parish priest's residence.
Bulacan massacre	21 June 1982	Pulilan, Bulacan	5 (all civilians)	Six peasant organizers conducting a meeting at a farmer's house were raided by soldiers and five of them were taken away. They were found dead in San Rafael a day after. Only one, who evaded the raid, survived.
Labo incident	23 June 1982	Labo, Camarines Norte	5 (all civilians)	In retaliation for the death of a soldier's friend, victims finishing the construction of the army detachment were shot by its soldiers.
Tong Umapoy massacre	1983	Tawi-Tawi	57 (all civilians)	A Navy ship allegedly fired on a passenger boat, killing people on board.
Don Mariano Marcos Massacre	16 April 1983	Don Mariano Marcos, Misamis Occidental	6 (Integrated Civilian Home Defense Force)	Killed by soldiers as punishment for losing their weapons to the NPA
Godod Ambush (Rebel attack)	29 September 1983	Godod, Zamboanga del Norte	46 (39 soldiers, 7 civilians)	About 70 suspected NPA rebels ambushed an army patrol unit in what was then the worst single attack on Government forces since the start of the NPA rebellion; only eleven survived.
Digos Killings	13–14 November 1983	Digos, Davao del Sur	3	Abducted and later killed by soldiers who accused them of involvement in the killing of a lieutenant.
Adlay Massacre	19 November 1983	Sitio Adlay, Anahao Daan, Tago, Surigao del Sur	4	Attack on the village by paramilitaries
Sibalom Bridge Massacre	13 May 1984	Pangpang Bridge, Sibalom, Antique	7	Supporters of Batasang Pambansa candidate Evelio Javier killed by suspected gunmen of a pro-Marcos political rival.
Libacao Ambush	26 August 1984	Libacao, Aklan	11	Attack on a convoy carrying the town mayor and his escorts from the CHDF by the New People's Army.
President Roxas murders	3 April 1985	President Roxas, North Cotabato	8	The family of Basic Christian Community lay preacher Protacio Rabuya was killed by an armed group. The Philippine Army claimed that the family housed New People's Army militants and alleged that they were killed in an accidental grenade detonation. Neighbors and relatives said that government forces had come to town, asked for the Rabuya house, and then shot and killed everyone inside. The victims were noted as parishioners of Tullio Favali, who was murdered by Ilaga gunmen days later.
Sinasa village massacre	9 September 1985	Sinasa, Davao City	68 (perpetrator and his followers)	Religious leader Mangayanon Butaog fed poisoned food to his followers in a remote mountain village, murdered his wife and two children with a machete, and later committed suicide; five survived.
Escalante massacre	20 September 1985	Escalante, Negros Occidental	20 (all civilians)	A crowd of estimated 5,000, holding a strike, were shot by government forces during dispersal; scores injured. The involved policemen were jailed and later released on parole in 2003.
Balamban murders	5 October 1985	Balamban, Cebu	9 (family members)	Skeletal remains of Anugot family members were exhumed on 29 August 2008.
Inopacan massacre	1985	Mt. Sapang Dako, Baranggay Culisihan, Inopacan, Leyte	67	New People's Army purge were discovered by authorities in a mass grave site on 28 August 2006.
Guinobatan ambush	3 March 1986	Guinobatan, Albay	19	NPA attack on an army transport.
Gumaca ambush	2 July 1986	Gumaca, Quezon	11	NPA attack on an army convoy.
Pamplona ambush	2 July 1986	Pamplona, Cagayan	9	NPA attack
Mendiola massacre (Black Thursday)	January 22, 1987	Mendiola, San Miguel, Manila	13 (all civilians)	Government forces opened fire on thousands of farmers marching to Malacañang Palace; 39 were injured. None were convicted.
Lupao massacre	10 February 1987	Sitio Padlao, Namulandayan, Lupao, Nueva Ecija	17 (all civilians)	Victims were killed by soldiers, reportedly in retaliation for the death of a platoon leader killed by NPA. Soldiers involved were later acquitted by a court martial.
Candulawan massacre	28 February 1987	Candulawan, Talisay, Cebu	3	Villagers killed by paramilitaries
Malinao ambush	4 May 1987	Malinao, Aklan	16	NPA Attack on government soldiers
Pantar Massacre	29 June 1987	Pantar, Lanao del Norte	5 (Islamic missionaries)	Members of the international Islamic missionary group, Tablighi Jamaat, including 2 Malaysian nationals, were stopped and killed in the vicinity of an army checkpoint
Mahaling Massacre	9 August 1987	Mahaling, Himamaylan, Negros Occidental	6	Members of a Basic Christian Community abducted and killed by paramilitaries
DXRA massacre	27 August 1987	Davao City	9 (4 local mediamen; 5 civilians)	Communist rebels attacked radio stations DXRA and DXMF, however, failed to cause casualties to the latter.
Lason Batch	5 September 1987	Zamboanga City	19	More than 200 Philippine Constabulary soldiers fell ill and showed symptoms of pesticide poisoning after taking refreshments from supposed civilians while jogging, with the equivalent of an entire platoon dying over the next three days. The group behind the mass poisoning was never identified.
Camalig Ambush	27 February 1988	Camalig, Albay	13	NPA Attack on the Philippine Army Scout Rangers
1988 Manila killings	22 May 1988	Manila	9	A man drinking with neighbors, most of them soldiers, when an argument broke out. Contaoe, armed with a .45-caliber pistol, killed five of his companions and wounded another. After the shooting, Contaoe went home, fetched an M-16 rifle and barged into a neighbor's house, where he killed four more persons and wounded two children.
Tukuran Massacre	16 September 1988	San Antonio, Tukuran, Zamboanga del Sur	3	Villagers were tortured and killed by soldiers who accused them of being NPA rebels
Midsalip massacre (Family murders)	22 November 1988	Midsalip, Zamboanga del Sur	9 (family members: couple and seven of their children)	Victims were hacked to death in their home, by assailants in an apparent robbery. Two other children managed to survive.
Bagtik massacre (Shooting incident)	22 November 1988	Bagtik, San Remigio, Cebu	17 (all civilians)	Gunmen arrived in an isolated mountain area and shot around the chapel, while villagers gathered there for evening prayers, as well as an adjacent residence. At least 12 were wounded, three of them critically. Authorities were able to learn about the incident two days later.
Pagao Massacre	18 February 1989	Carayman, Calbayog, Western Samar	8	Civilians, including 4 members of the Pagao family were killed by soldiers under the guise of an encounter with the NPA
Santa Catalina Massacre	29 March 1989	Buenavista, Santa Catalina, Negros Oriental	5 (farmers)	Abducted and killed by anti-communist paramilitaries
Paombong Massacre	28 April 1989	San Jose, Paombong, Bulacan	9	Claimed by soldiers to have been caught in an encounter after initially claiming that the victims were NPA rebels
Rano massacre	25 June 1989	Binaton, Digos, Davao del Sur	37-41 (figures varied; mostly unarmed civilians, some armed anti-communist vigilantes, some count include 2 claimed NPA rebel deaths)	Thirty-nine victims were members of the United Church of Christ congregation, killed in church. Two NPA rebels also killed in an encounter. At least eight others were wounded.
1989 Davao hostage crisis	13–15 August 1989	Davao City	21	A hostage-taking incident, army jail detainees took as hostages 15 Joyous Assembly of God members; 5 Christian Pentecostals and 16 detainees, also hostages, were killed.

== 1990s ==
Name	Date	Location	Deaths	Notes
Pinukpuk Massacre	21 January 1990	Pinukpuk, Kalinga-Apayao	3	Killed by unknown gunmen. One of the victims, Ayangwa Claver, was the son of a prominent supporter of autonomy for the Cordillera.
Bacarra Funeral shooting	26 May 1990	Bacarra, Ilocos Norte	9	A 36-year-old airman opened fire at a slain officer's funeral, killing 9 fellow comrades whilst injuring 10. The suspect escaped and it is unknown if he was captured.
Mamindiala Massacre (Family murders)	3 August 1990	New Passi, Tacurong, Sultan Kudarat	19	Members of the Mamindiala family killed by soldiers who claimed that they were Muslim rebels
Peralta Massacre (Family murders)	16 August 1990	Manlocboc, Aguilar, Pangasinan	4	Members of the Peralta family killed by gunmen working for a police sergeant
Vizconde massacre (Family murders)	30 June 1991	BF Homes, Parañaque, Metro Manila	3	Vizconde family members were the victims, all had suffered multiple stab wounds. Hubert Webb, scion of a prominent family was convicted of masterminding the killings in 2000 but was later acquitted by the Supreme Court in 2010
Bensen Massacre (Family murders)	30 June 1991	Hacienda Wawa, Santa Rosa, Murcia, Negros Occidental	3	Members of the same family, including a pregnant woman, killed by suspected soldiers possibly for their involvement in trade union activities
Talacogon Massacre	16 October 1991	Del Monte, Talacogon, Agusan del Sur	4	Leaders of a religious sect killed by the NPA for their role in counter-insurgency operations
Marihatag ambush	15 February 1992	Marihatag, Surigao del Sur	47	NPA ambush on an army convoy
Sablan massacre (Family murders)	18–19 June 1992	Sitio Dakes, Banangan, Sablan, Benguet	3 (family members: survivor's sister and 2 cousins)	Victims were killed by five policemen; Myrna Diones was the only survivor.
Tungawan massacres (Rebel attack)	13 December 1992	Sinaguran, Tungawan, Zamboanga del Sur	40 (all civilians)	About 20 armed men, suspected Muslim renegades led by a former officer of the Moro National Liberation Front, entered Christian settlements in three villages, herded and attacked Subanon residents. As high as a dozen others were seriously injured. Suspects were reportedly angered by the refusal of some villagers to pay protection money.
Antipolo massacre (Rampage killing)	3 December 1993	Sitio Kulasisi, San Luis, Antipolo, Rizal	5 (perpetrator's neighbors)	Winefredo Masagca, believed to be "possessed by evil spirits," killed his neighbors in their house.
Maguindanao incident (Rebel attack)	13 December 1993	Maguindanao	8–9 (all civilians)	A group of about 20 armed men stopped a bus; Christian passengers were separated from Muslims, robbed and shot. Fifteen others were wounded, while a Christian minister was left unhurt.
Lipa Arandia massacre (Family murders)	10 April 1994	Sabang, Lipa, Batangas	3	Angelina Arandia, along with her daughters Chelsea Liz and Anne Geleen died from multiple stab wounds
Ipil massacre (Terror attack)	4 April 1995	Ipil, Zamboanga del Sur	53 (all civilians)	About 200 heavily armed Abu Sayyaf rebels, who had arrived the day before disguised as soldiers, launched a 2½-hour surprise attack in a commercial district in the predominantly Christian town, shot civilians, burned hundreds of buildings after plundering some, took many hostages as they withdrew, and clashed with government reinforcements. At least 44 were wounded; arrests were made. The raid was said the worst since the 1970s.
Kuratong Baleleng Rubout	18 May 1995	Quezon City	11	Suspected members of an organized crime syndicate were killed under suspicious circumstances by the police.
Payumo massacre (Family murders)	9 September 1995	Santa Rosa, Laguna	4 (family members: mother, 3 children)	Victims were believed to be killed by drug addicts; a daughter of the family survived. Four suspects were convicted by the Biñan RTC in 1997. However, in 2002, the Supreme Court lowered the death penalty sentence of three of them to four life terms each, while the fourth suspect, then sentenced to life imprisonment, was acquitted.
Olongapo incident (Rampage killing)	21 October 1995	Olongapo	8	Edgar Fernandez staged a shooting spree in a private hospital for its management's poor treatment; 3 were wounded.
Buhi massacre (Family murders)	28 December 1995	Sitio Bogtong, Gabas, Buhi, Camarines Sur	13 (family members: from the Cascante–Gayte clan: mother & 2 children; from the Gayte–Campo clan: couple & 5 children; also 2 another Gayte relatives and an adopted daughter. They including 5 young minors.)	The incident was triggered by a land dispute involving Nieva, Gayte, and Campo families. In retaliation for the killing of landlord Cristito Nieva, Jr. on 28 October 1995, a number of armed men attacked the compound in a remote village and later shot and hacked the victims in their houses, with three of them beheaded, and the rest sustaining gunshots. One of them was the wife of one of the suspects implicated to the landlord's murder. Two of nine survivors, one from each clan, stood as star witness. Some of the involved and implicated were a police chief, with five others including Ramon Madrideo, once turned as state witness, who were arrested in January 1996) and four from the Nieva clan, including the alleged mastermind Ester Nieva, the landlord's wife, who were arrested in 1999.). A case was considered solved upon the surrender of the remaining three of 13 suspects in the landlord's murder in August 1996.
Cotabato incident (Mass murder)	11 May 1997	Pigcawayan, Cotabato	5 (minor brothers)	A case of alleged cannibalism.
Sara massacre (Rampage killing)	12 August 1998	Bacabac, Sara, Iloilo	10 (travelers, including a United States Peace Corps volunteer)	Five men attacked four vehicles and shot the victims in a robbery incident. On 14 August, Ernesto (Edgardo) Brito surrendered; he admitted, but later denied, his involvement while pointing at Ricky Braga as the alleged mastermind, and his second cousin; the two were later captured. On 19 May 2000, a court sentenced Brito to death and convicted two confessed killers, the Braga cousins, as well as a couple for obstruction of justice.
Nueva Ecija incident (Summary killing)	March 1999	Jaen, Nueva Ecija; Tarlac City	5 (including a lone survivor in Jaen)	Victims were shot in Jaen, allegedly by the men of local police chief Supt. Alfredo Siwa. Their companion, a survivor and lone witness, was later killed by a group of eight armed men reportedly led by Siwa, at the Tarlac Provincial Hospital on 26 March. Siwa was later arrested and the entire Baliwag police force was relieved.

== 2000s ==
Name	Date	Location	Deaths	Notes
Mindoro Oriental murders (Rampage killing)	3 April 2000	Victoria, Oriental Mindoro	7 (all civilians)	Victims were fatally shot by two drunk soldiers in a videoke bar; two others were seriously wounded.
Lantawan ambush	7 May 2000	Lantawan, Basilan	13	Attack by the Abu Sayyaf on Army Special Forces
Jones ambush (Rebel attack)	28 June 2000	Jones, Isabela	13	NPA attack on a government convoy
Armed attack (Lanao del Sur) (Rebel attack)	16 July 2000	Somogot, Bumbaran, Lanao del Sur	21 (all Christian residents)	Victims were shot dead inside a mosque by about a hundred armed men, suspected to be Moro Islamic Liberation Front (MILF) rebels, who had attacked the village; ensued shooting rampage injured 11 people.
Armed attack (Cotabato) (Rebel attack)	4 August 2000	Cotabato	16 (all civilians)	Heavily armed men, suspected from the MILF, stopped the vehicles on a road; victims inside were robbed and shot; 10 were injured.
Himamaylan ambush (Rebel attack)	21 August 2000	Carabalan, Himamaylan, Negros Occidental	17 (all soldiers)	Attack by the NPA on a military transport
Dinagat massacre (Mass murder)	13 December 2000	San Jose, Surigao del Norte	11 (members of a faction of Philippine Benevolent Missionaries Association)	Members of the PBMA's White Guerreros were killed by the elite force, White Eagles, upon orders of the cult's leader Ruben Ecleo Jr., in his residence. Local police reported that the victims were hacked; but National Bureau of Investigation autopsies later found out that they were shot.
Bacolod murders (Family murders)	17 December 2000	Bacolod	8 (family members: father, 3 sons, his parents; also 2 family housemaids)	The Rivilla family's houseboy Bernon Gallo, later confessed and was convicted for the killings in the residence of a haciendero family wherein their driver had survived.
Afalla Massacre (Family murders)	18 April 2001	Bayombong, Nueva Vizcaya	4	Patriarch suspected in the murders of his wife and three children, who were found in a shallow grave along the Magat River
Novaliches Massacre	12 June 2001	Santa Lucia, Novaliches, Quezon City	5	Stabbings during a birthday party
Cateel ambush	17 November 2001	Cateel, Davao Oriental	18	Attack by the NPA on a military transport
Calonge Massacre (Family murders)	1 December 2001	Cabuluan, Villaverde, Nueva Vizcaya	3	Patriarch killed his wife and two daughters. A third daughter was wounded
Mandaue murders (Family murders)	18 June 2002	Mandaue, Cebu	5 (family members: 2 siblings and their parents, all in-laws of Ruben Ecleo Jr.; a neighbor)	Victims were shot dead in the Bacolod residence by Rico Gumonong, a PBMA member, who was later killed in an encounter with the responding policemen. Among the victims was Ben Bacolod, brother-in-law of Ruben Ecleo Jr. and believed to be the sole witness in the murder of his sister and Ecleo's wife, Alona Bacolod. He also testified on the 2000 Dinagat massacre. Ecleo surrendered to the police on 19 June. He had faced charges for two separate massacres and for the death of his wife.
Zamboanga City murders (Family murders)	19 December 2002	San Roque, Zamboanga City	7 (family members: mother, 3 children; also 3 family helpers)	Victims were murdered at the Tan family's house.
Kalawit Massacre	19 February 2003	Kalawit, Zamboanga del Norte	14	Villagers killed in an attack by Muslim rebels
Maigo Massacre	24 April 2003	Maigo, Lanao del Norte	13	Passengers aboard a jeepney killed in an attack by the MILF
Siocon Massacre	4 May 2003	Siocon, Zamboanga del Norte	34	Civilians killed in an attack by the MILF on the town
Balios Massacre	13 November 2003	Kalawit, Zamboanga del Norte	7	Members of the Balios family killed by bolo-wielding bandits
Hacienda Luisita massacre	16 November 2004	Hacienda Luisita, Tarlac	7	A clash between government troops and more than 6,000 protesting farm workers during an attempted dispersal resulted also in injuries of at least 120. Charges against the suspects were dismissed in 2010.
San Rafael ambush	16 November 2004	Pasong Callos, San Rafael, Bulacan	10	Attack by the NPA on soldiers conducting a post-typhoon rescue mission
Palo massacre	21 November 2005	San Agustin, Palo, Leyte	7	Claimed to be a legitimate operation by the military, the "gunfight" between the soldiers and alleged armed groups lasted for about 45 minutes at dawn. Resulted in the death of 7 peasants, including a pregnant woman, 11 were wounded, 8 were arrested but only 6 were detained, and 2 were still missing.
Isabela massacre	19 March 2006	Barangay Bagong Tanza, Aurora, Isabela	7	House help (couple) and driver murdered seven members of a wealthy family, including three children. They confessed and were later sentenced to 100-year jail terms.
Calbayog massacre	2 June 2007	Gadgaran, Calbayog, Samar	10	Danilo "Danny" Guades hacked to death 10 people with a bolo and injured 17 more on a drunk rampage through his neighborhood at early morning.
Basilan beheading incident	10 July 2007	Al-Barka, Basilan	23	Soldiers ambushed by the MILF during rescue operations for a kidnapped Italian priest. 11 of the victims were beheaded
Mangalino Massacre	25 November 2007	Tanza, Cavite	4	Cecilio Mangalino fatally stabbed his pregnant wife, mother-in-law and daughter inside their home and injured two other daughters while drunk following an argument with his wife.
Olongapo massacre	13 March 2008	Gordon Heights, Olongapo	4 (including model Scarlet Garcia and her cousin)	Victims were killed in a condominium unit.
Olongapo murders (Family murders)	27 July 2008	Sitio Kakilingan, Iram Resettlement, Brgy. Cabalan, Olongapo	3 (Korean family members: mother, daughter, grandchild)	Victims were stabbed by unidentified men in their house.
RCBC robbery-massacre	16 May 2008	Cabuyao, Laguna	10	All bank employees were shot dead.
Calamba massacre	18 May 2008	Hornalan, Calamba, Laguna	8	
Lanao del Norte offensive	18 August 2008	Kauswagan, Lanao del Norte; Kolambugan, Lanao del Norte; Maasim, Sarangani; Kalamansig, Sultan Kudarat	46	Simultaneous attacks by MILF rebels on civilian and military targets across Mindanao
Shariff Aguak murders (Family murders)	28 August 2008	Tapikan, Shariff Aguak, Maguindanao	8 (members of the Lumenda and Aleb families)	Ampatuan militiamen shot and killed them as they were harvesting in their rice field.
Cervantes ambush	25 October 2009	Cervantes, Ilocos Sur	10	NPA attack on government soldiers
Maguindanao massacre (Mass murder)	23 November 2009	Sitio Masalay, Brgy. Salman, Ampatuan, Maguindanao	58 (most of them were part of a convoy: family members, including E. Mangudadatu's wife and his two sisters, and supporters of a perpetrator's political rival, 32 journalists; lawyers; aides; 6 passersby that mistakenly identified as part of the convoy. The body of one victim, journalist Reynaldo Momay, was never found, which led to only 57 counts of murder being filed against the perpetrators)	A convoy carrying relatives and supporters of Buluan vice mayor Esmael Mangudadatu was stopped by around 200 armed men while on their way to the provincial capitol to file his candidacy, challenging Datu Unsay mayor Andal Ampatuan Jr., son of the incumbent Maguindanao governor Andal Ampatuan Sr. and member of one of Mindanao's leading Muslim political clans for upcoming elections. The victims were later abducted and killed and their bodies were buried in shallow graves on a hilltop. On December 19, 2019, a court convicted 28 people, including Andal Jr. and Autonomous Region in Muslim Mindanao Governor Zaldy Ampatuan, and sentenced them to life imprisonment; 56 others were acquitted. Andal Sr. died in custody before the conclusion of the trial.

== 2010s ==
Name	Date	Location	Deaths	Notes
Manila hostage crisis	23 August 2010	Quirino Grandstand, Manila	8 (tourists)	Hong Kong tourists killed by Rolando Mendoza, a disgruntled policeman, after a 9-hour standoff on a tour bus. Mendoza was killed by a police sniper during a rescue mission.
Rendon massacre (Family murders)	12 October 2011	Santa Felomina, San Pablo, Laguna	4 (family members: couple, 2 children)	Ernie Tambuong, victims' neighbor, killed them because of a suspicion; only a daughter of the family survived.
Sibago Island massacre (Terror attack)	24 January 2012	Sibago Island, Hadji Mohammad Ajul, Basilan	15 (all civilians: Pagadian City residents)	Gunmen who were the victim's rivals, aboard three pump boats fired at them while fishing; three wounded.
Tinoc ambush	25 April 2012	Gumhang, Tinoc, Ifugao	12 (11 soldiers, 1 civilian)	NPA ambush
Roque-Sta. Ana. massacre (Family murders)	16 August 2012	Saint Francis Village, Balagtas, Bulacan	4 (family members: grandfather, mother, 2 children)	Victims were killed in a robbery.
Kawit massacre	4 January 2013	Tabon 1, Kawit, Cavite	8 (including the perpetrator)	30-minute shooting rampage that saw a drunk man named Ronald Baquiran Bae kill at least 7 people and a dog and wounded 12 others with a semiautomatic pistol before he was shot and killed by police. Another man, John Paul Lopez, was later arrested for assisting the gunman during the shooting by reloading his pistol magazine. The motive of the suspect is still unclear. A subsequent search of Bae's house led to the discovery of human remains.
Atimonan massacre	6 January 2013	Atimonan, Quezon	13	Initially claimed to be a roadside shootout conducted by Philippine National Police against a gambling syndicate leader but was found by the National Bureau of Investigation to have been a rubout.
Nunungan massacre (Terror attack)	22 April 2013	Nunungan, Lanao del Norte	13 (all civilians: including relatives of the town mayor, supporters)	Convoy of Mayor Abdulmalik Manamparan was ambushed; 10 wounded.
Pampanga massacre	21 September 2013	Angeles, Pampanga	7	Nicolas Edejer, a fish trader, sustained a gunshot wound in the head during the killings that claimed the life of his wife Corazon, son Kenneth, nephew Nelson Dominico, housemaids Teresita Lansangan and alias Kaykay, and Benigno Villanueva.
Pili massacre	31 December 2013	Pili, Camarines Sur	5 (including the perpetrator)	Anthony Zepeda held his father, brother, sister-in-law and a maid hostage for 10 hours before shooting them. He then shot himself.
Baguio massacre	6 April 2014	Kayang Hilltop, Baguio	5	Victims (including 3 minors and a maid) were stabbed inside a rented apartment on the fourth floor of a building. On 28 January 2016, a court convicted Phillip Tolentino Avino for the killings and sentenced him to life imprisonment.
Talipao massacre	28 July 2014	Talipao, Sulu	21	Armed men opened fire at a convoy of civilians who were travelling to a feast to mark the end of Ramadan.
Mamasapano clash (Also known as the Mamasapano massacre)	25 January 2015	Tukanalipao, Mamasapano, Maguindanao	44 SAF personnel	A police operation, codenamed Oplan Exodus, by Philippine National Police-Special Action Force (allegedly joined by US Army Special Forces) against the Bangsamoro Islamic Freedom Fighters and the Moro Islamic Liberation Front; SAF members were fired upon by members of the MILF.
Negros Oriental massacre	5 February 2016	Sitio Alibabay, Barangay Mabigo, Canlaon, Negros Oriental	3 (including a 15-year-old girl)	Roberto Montano Jr. killed Virgilio Tabanao, 61, his wife Erlinda, 69, and granddaughter, Kia, 15, at their home.
Zamboanga fishing boat killings	10 January 2017	Zamboanga City	8	A fishing boat with a crew of 15 men was attacked by unknown gunmen, leaving eight dead and seven survivors. Victims were tied up and killed. The motive is believed to be robbery or gang violence.
Resorts World Manila attack	1-2 June 2017	Manila	40 (including perpetrator)	Perpetrator killed 39 people in two locations over the course of two hours before committing suicide. The killings at the resort is assumed unintentional. Motive for both attacks is believed to be robbery to repay gambling debts
SJDM massacre (Family murders)	27 June 2017	San Jose del Monte, Bulacan	5 (family members: grandmother, mother, 3 children)	
Hacienda Nene massacre	20 October 2018	Hacienda Nene, Sagay, Negros Occidental	9 (all farmers)	At least 40 men reportedly fired at sugarcane farmers and members of the National Federation of Sugar Workers (NFSW) and burned three of the bodies. Four farmers, two of which were minors managed to escape.

== 2020s ==
Name	Date	Location	Deaths	Notes
2021 Calabarzon raids	7 March 2021	Laguna, Cavite, Batangas, and Rizal provinces, Calabarzon	9	Nine left-wing activists and environmentalists were killed in a series of operations conducted by the Philippine National Police and the Philippine Army in Calabarzon
New Bataan massacre	24 February 2022	Barangay Andap, New Bataan, Davao de Oro	7	Massacre of five Lumad teachers and community workers and their two drivers by Armed Forces of the Philippines
Lantapan Massacre	26 November 2022	Sitio Kiabacat, Barangay Songco, Lantapan, Bukidnon	5	6 persons shot and hacked the victims, which included children. Believed to have been caused by a land dispute
Pamplona Massacre	4 March 2023	San Isidro, Pamplona, Negros Oriental	10	Assassination of the governor of Negros Oriental, Roel Degamo and nine visitors after at least six gunmen armed with rifles and wearing military-style uniforms opened fire in his home.
Trece Martires Massacre (Mass killing)	9 March 2023	Cabuco, Trece Martires, Cavite	4	Four children were stabbed to death by their stepfather Felimon Escalona, who then committed suicide.
Himamaylan Massacre (Mass killing)	14 June 2023	Sitio Kangkiling, Barangay Buenavista, Himamaylan, Negros Occidental	4	Four members of the Fausto family, including two children, were shot dead, with the AFP and the NPA trading blame.
Sapad Massacre	7 January 2024	Sitio Lapao, Barangay Karkum, Sapad, Lanao del Norte	7	The bodies of seven members of the Gaviola and Legara families from Margosatubig, Zamboanga del Sur, including three minors, were found buried with bullet wounds to the head in a freshly-dug grave on this date.
Cupang Massacre	22 April 2025	Cupang, Antipolo, Rizal	7	Seven workers, including two minors, were fatally stabbed inside a bakery. Bogart Ramirez, who was a co-owner of the bakery, subsequently surrendered and confessed to the killing, citing a business dispute with a co-owner, who also died in the massacre. He also claimed the killings were in self-defense as he believed his co-workers were plotting to kill him.
Maguing Massacre	11 May 2026	Dilimbayan, Maguing, Lanao del Sur	5	The skeletal remains of five people believed to have been killed by extremist groups in 2022 were discovered in a common grave on this date.
