= Negros massacre =

Negros massacre may refer to:

- Escalante massacre, 1985
- Sagay massacre, 2018
- Canlaon massacre, 2019
