= Toboso encounter =

Armed confrontation in the Philippines

- Part of Communist armed conflicts in the Philippines
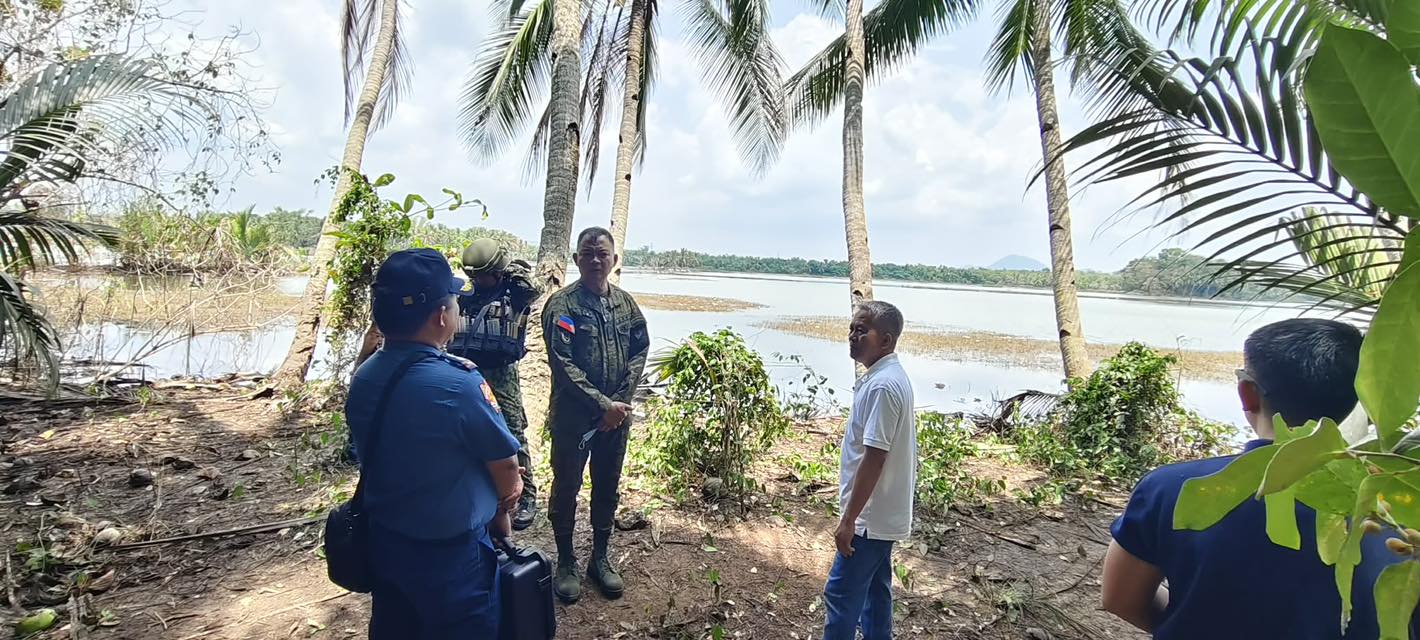
- One of the encounter sites being inspected by Toboso mayor Richard M. Jaojoco (second from right) and other officials on April 20, 2026
Date	April 19, 2026
Location	Salamanca, Toboso, Negros Occidental, Philippines
Result	Armed confrontation; 19 people killed

Belligerents
Philippines	New People's Army

Commanders and leaders
Lt. Col. Eric Alfonso (commanding officer, 79th Infantry Battalion)	Roger Fabillar (leader, NPA Northern Negros Front) †

Units involved
Philippine Army; 79th Infantry Battalion; 3rd Infantry Division	Northern Negros Front

Casualties and losses
1 soldier wounded	Military claim: 19 NPA combatants killed CPP claim: 10 NPA combatants killed Official national investigation report: 10 NPA combatants killed
- Official national investigation report: 9 civilians killed by the military (Alano, Santuyo, Ledesma, Wendel, Prijoles, Sorem, Sabillo, and two minors)

The Toboso encounter of April 19, 2026, also referred to as the Toboso killings, Toboso clash, Toboso incident, or, in some accounts, the Toboso massacre, was an armed confrontation between the 79th Infantry Battalion of the Philippine Army (79IB PA) and the Northern Negros Front of the New People's Army (NPA NNF) in Salamanca, Toboso, Negros Occidental, which resulted in the deaths of ten NPA members and nine civilians, who are collectively referred to as the "Toboso 19".

The civilians included University of the Philippines students Alyssa Alano and Maureen Keil Santuyo, poet and journalist RJ Nichole Ledesma of Paghimutad-Negros, community researcher Errol Wendel, and American activists Lyle Prijoles and Kai Dana-Rene Sorem.

The operation also resulted in the death of Northern Negros Front commander Roger Fabillar, who was being pursued by the 79IB and had a bounty of ₱1 million (US$20,304.57) for his arrest or neutralization at the time of his death.

The NPA later acknowledged ten of the fatalities, including Fabillar, as having been its armed revolutionaries, but asserted that the remaining nine individuals, Alano, Santuyo, Ledesma, Wendel, Prijoles, Sorem, local resident Roel Sabillo, and two minors, were civilians.

The incident raised concerns within the Philippine public, particularly among civil society groups and the press, that civilians had become targets of the practice of "red-tagging" and that individuals were being effectively criminalized simply by their presence in certain locations. Comparisons were specifically drawn to the case of botanist Leonard Co, who was killed in 2010 in Kananga, Leyte, while gathering botanical samples for a biodiversity project of a renewable energy company.

On August 2026, the 44-page investigation report of the National Fact-Finding and Solidarity Mission (NFFSM) was released, confirming that the military "fired indiscriminately" in the incident. The mission report flagged serious violations of international humanitarian and human rights laws. It found that the soldiers from the 79th Infantry Battalion (IB) had a clear view of the scene and could distinguish between those who were armed and firing back, and those who were unarmed. Despite this, the mission found that the military still fired indiscriminately at whoever they saw in the area, resulting to the murder of 9 Filipino civilians (Alano, Santuyo, Ledesma, Wendel, Prijoles, Sorem, Sabillo, and two minors) who were never involved with communist combatants.

== Background ==
=== New People's Army conflict ===
The Toboso incident took place in the context of the ongoing conflict between the Philippine government and the Marxist–Leninist–Maoist New People's Army (NPA).

==== Duterte termination of peace talks ====
The Philippine government had been undertaking new offensives against the NPA since November 2017, when President Rodrigo Duterte terminated the various rounds of peace talks which had been ongoing between the government and the NPA since the late 1980s.

==== Anti-Terrorism Act of 2020 and establishment of NTF-ELCAC ====
This led to the 2018 establishment of an agency called the National Task Force to End Local Communist Armed Conflict (NTF-ELCAC) through Executive Order No. 70., and the Duterte administration's labeling of the NPA as a terrorist organization under the Anti-Terrorism Act of 2020.

On December 9, 2021, the Supreme Court of the Philippines struck two provisions of the Anti-Terrorism Act as unconstitutional: firstly, the second paragraph of Section 25 which would have allowed the automatic adoption of foreign jurisdictions or international organizations to define "terrorists" or "terror groups"; and a qualifier under Section 4(e) which would have allowed "advocacy, protest, dissent and similar actions" to be defined as terror acts if alleged to be "intended to cause death or serious physical harm to a person, to endanger a person’s life, or to create a serious risk to public safety.” The court declared this provision "overbroad and violative of freedom of expression," and so the section now says that terrorism "shall not include advocacy, protest, dissent, stoppage of work, industrial or mass action, and other similar exercises of civil and political rights." Local and International Human Rights Groups such as Amnesty International, however, expressed concern that the law "remains dangerous and fundamentally flawed."

==== AFP strategic counterinsurgency plans ====
Since the promulgation of the Anti Terror Act in 2021, the Armed Forces' offensives against the NPA have been defined by two strategic plans: the Development Support and Security Plan (DSSP) "Kapayapaan" from 2017 to 2022, and the AFP PLEDS (Peace, Law Enforcement, and Development Support) Plan "Pagkakaisa" since 2023, which is intended to be in force until 2028.

These strategic plans are characterized as "whole-of-government" or "whole-of-nation" approaches, particularly focusing on engaging local government units and local chief executives to achieve their strategic goals and sustain them.

In his 2025 State of the Nation Address, Bongbong Marcos claimed that there were "no more guerilla groups in the country," echoing earlier claims of success from the AFP after focused military operations, the targeting of leaders, and the constriction of lines of support, although media groups such as Vera Files point out that a high number of encounters, which saw 146 alleged NPA killed between January to November 2024, was an indication of the continued existence of the organization.

=== Human rights in the Philippines ===
The Philippine government ratified the Geneva Conventions, which set standards for humanitarian conduct in times of war and local or international armed conflict, and signed into law the Philippine Act on Crimes Against International Humanitarian Law, Genocide, and Other Crimes Against Humanity. The government also signed the Comprehensive Agreement on Respect for Human Rights and International Humanitarian Law (CARHRIHL) with the National Democratic Front of the Philippines. These laws provide for the protection of civilians, including media workers, medical personnel, religious personnel, humanitarian workers, and hors de combat, or combatants rendered incapable of participating in hostilities.

=== Media killings in the Philippines ===
The Philippines is one of the most dangerous countries in the world for journalists, ranking 114th out of 180 in the 2026 in the World Press Freedom Index of the Reporters Without Borders. Colleagues of RJ Ledesma assert that evidence against him may have been planted. Altermidya said that a photo of Ledesma with a gun, ammo pouch, and bandolier appeared to have been staged, while boots and other belongings presented as evidence appeared unused.

The National Union of Journalists in the Philippines held a protest action in May 2026 calling for justice in the killing of Ledesma and for the release from detention of Tacloban-based community journalist Frenchie Mae Cumpio.

=== Negros killings ===
Circumstances relating to the Toboso incident have been compared to a history of violent attacks in Negros. The Toboso incident has been compared to the 2023 Fausto massacre, in which Roly and Emelda Fausto and their two children were killed in their home in Himamaylan City, Negros Occidental, and the 2018 Sagay massacre, during which gunmen killed nine sugarcane farmers, including four women and two children, in Sagay, Negros Occidental. Alyssa Alano, at the time of her killing, was conducting a study on the effects of land grabbing and militarization on the farmers of Negros. Following the Toboso incident, Unyon ng Manggagawa sa Agrikultura (Union of Agricultural Workers) described Negros as the "massacre capital of human rights and international humanitarian violations".

=== Dismantling of the NPA's Northern Negros Front ===
On April 6, 2021, the joint security forces issued a joint resolution declaring that the Philippine Army's 79th Infantry Battalion (79IB) already dismantled the Northern Negros Front (NNF) of NPA. Twenty-five of the 26 insurgency-cleared villages in Negros Occidental by July are located in the northern part.

The 79IB, based in Sagay, covers mainly the three districts comprising the northern part of the province as well as Bacolod. Meanwhile, the NNF is part of the NPA's Komiteng Rehiyon-Negros, Cebu, Bohol and Siquijor.

However, remnants of the front in northern Negros were trying to regain their lost territory, being figured in clashes with government troops in Silay, Manapla and Calatrava within a year thereafter and suffering further casualties on their side.

=== Manhunt for Fabillar ===
In 2023, a manhunt was launched by the 79th Infantry Battalion for the "arrest or neutralization" of Roger Fabillar, (Note: Roger Fabillar had aliases "Arnel Tapang", "Jhong", "Nono", and "Domeng".) the leader of the NPA's Northern Negros Front.

Fabillar -- whom the 303rd Infantry Brigade alleged to be a "hitman" who was "tasked with carrying out special operations" -- faced murder cases in northern Negros for his and the NNF's alleged involvement in the alleged summary execution in Calatrava, Toboso, and Escalante of at least 36 civilians accused of being military informants since 2025. The Philippine Army additionally alleged that Fabillar was involved in arson and extortion as well.

The 79IB offered a ₱1-million cash reward; the 303rd Infantry Brigade later asserted that a ₱2-million bounty for Fabillar's arrest or neutralization had been put up by private individuals.

== Events ==
While full details of the encounter have not yet been fully uncovered, a few details have found their way into media reports, as reports both sides revealed some details.

=== April 6 clash ===
On April 6, the Army's 79IB clashed twice with Fabillar's group in Barangay Minautok, Calatrava, injuring a soldier.

=== April 19 encounter ===
A second encounter between the 79IB and the NPA NNF occurred on April 19 at the temporary encampment by the NPA in Sitio Sinugmawan, Barangay Salamanca, Toboso, with the 79IB claiming to be acting based on information from local residents.

The initial firefight broke out at around 3:58 a.m. (Note: In other sources: At around 4 a.m.) Eight clashes against the NNF remnants took place in Sitio Sinugmawan and Sitio Plaringding between that time and 3 p.m. of the same day.

Ledesma's employer, Altermidya-People's Alternative Media Network, noted in an April 22 statement that Ledesma "was not in the initial clash site in Sitio Sinugmawan," and that he was instead "attacked in a separate peasant community in Sitio Plariding during an ensuing military pursuit operation." It said that Ledesma had been doing "immersion reporting on the effects of renewable energy projects – including solar farm expansion and windmill projects – on vulnerable farmer communities."

A 79IB soldier was brought to a hospital in Bacolod for treatment after sustaining two gunshot wounds, one in each arm.

The 79IB said that it recovered 19 assorted firearms during the operation.

==== Evacuations ====
Toboso mayor Richard Jaojoco reported that the clashes forced the evacuation of 167–168 families or 653 individuals from the adjacent villages of Salamanca and San Jose, being brought to two schools. Escalante mayor Melecio Yap reported that more than 200 residents near the Escalante–Toboso boundary evacuated as a precaution.

=== April 22 arrests ===
Some suspected communists were able to escape following the Toboso encounter. On April 22, five of them were arrested by security forces in Talisay, including two high-ranking squad leaders—the NNF squad leader who had been the Negros Island Region's top 2 most wanted person; and a leader of a unit under the Central Negros Front 2. Firearms and explosives were found in their possession.

== Aftermath ==
=== Retrieval of bodies and identification of fatalities ===
Later, in pursuit operations in a fishpond area in Sitio Plaringding—about three kilometers from the initial encounter site—the bodies of the slain alleged rebels were recovered. The following day, the Army's 303rd Infantry Brigade confirmed the deaths of at least 19 alleged "rebel remnants", including Fabillar. The Philippine National Police retrieved the remains which were later brought to Escalante for identification.

That supposedly marked the highest number of rebel fatalities recorded in a single encounter in Negros since the 1990s. The operation was reportedly resulted to the fall of the leadership structure of the remaining NPA forces in northern Negros.

=== Initial autopsy findings ===
Beginning on April 25, 2026, the remains of five of the nineteen casualties of the incident were flown to Manila for autopsy, which was conducted by Raquel Fortun.

In a press briefing about her preliminary findings on May 7, she noted that there were "a lot of questions on recovery, the handling and the disposition," with media coverage noting that Fortun said the initial autopsy findings "raised questions which the military's narrative does not exactly answer," although she stopped short of saying that the killings were unlawful.

Fortun noted that the bodies were "not well preserved," noting that "In the first place, all of these cases should have undergone basic homicide investigation, which means starting with the CSI [crime scene investigation] — where they fell, where they dropped, and so on." Only two of the five bodies she examined were given to her with their associated clothing, and one of the two bags had been mislabeled.

Fortun added that one of the bodies received by her for autopsy, initially identified as Errol Wendel's, was in fact not his, and was thus relabeled as belonging to an "unidentified male" pending more information. In another case, she noted that a female body's wounds had not been immediately fatal. She expressed concern about the case, saying "So the question there—and I pose this to the lawyers—is: wait a minute, isn't that a war crime? Because the person was injured; they should have been attended to. This means she bled at the scene, and you did nothing."

Fortun noted that her findings were still preliminary, saying that she ideally should have been allowed to autopsy at least 13 of the 19 casualties to get a better sense of what happened.

=== Resolution from the Toboso Municipal Council ===
On April 28, Toboso mayor Jaojoco and the Sangguniang Bayan (municipal council) released a resolution declaring the Communist Party of the Philippines, NPA, and the National Democratic Front (CPP–NPA–NDF) as persona non grata in the municipality, condemning what the document called "insurgency-related violence." The resolution stated that it was in alignment "with the efforts of the national government, including the National Task Force to End Local Communist Armed Conflict (NTF-ELCAC)."

=== Controversy over civilian or combatant status of casualties ===
Media reports of the deaths of Alano and Ledesma, who were the first of the casualties to be identified, immediately resulted in controversy over civilian or combatant status of some of the casualties.

The Army released a statement on April 23, 2026, dismissing the claims that civilians were among those killed.

On April 27, 2026, upon releasing its internal list of casualties in the encounter, the CPP issued a statement through information officer Marco Valbuena denouncing the military's alleged indiscriminate targeting of civilians in its operation against the NPA, stating that "Based on the initial information we have gathered, they [the nine civilian casualties] were killed despite the fact they were unarmed or non-combatants."

== Casualties ==
The identities of the 19 fatalities slowly became available through media reports and government statements.

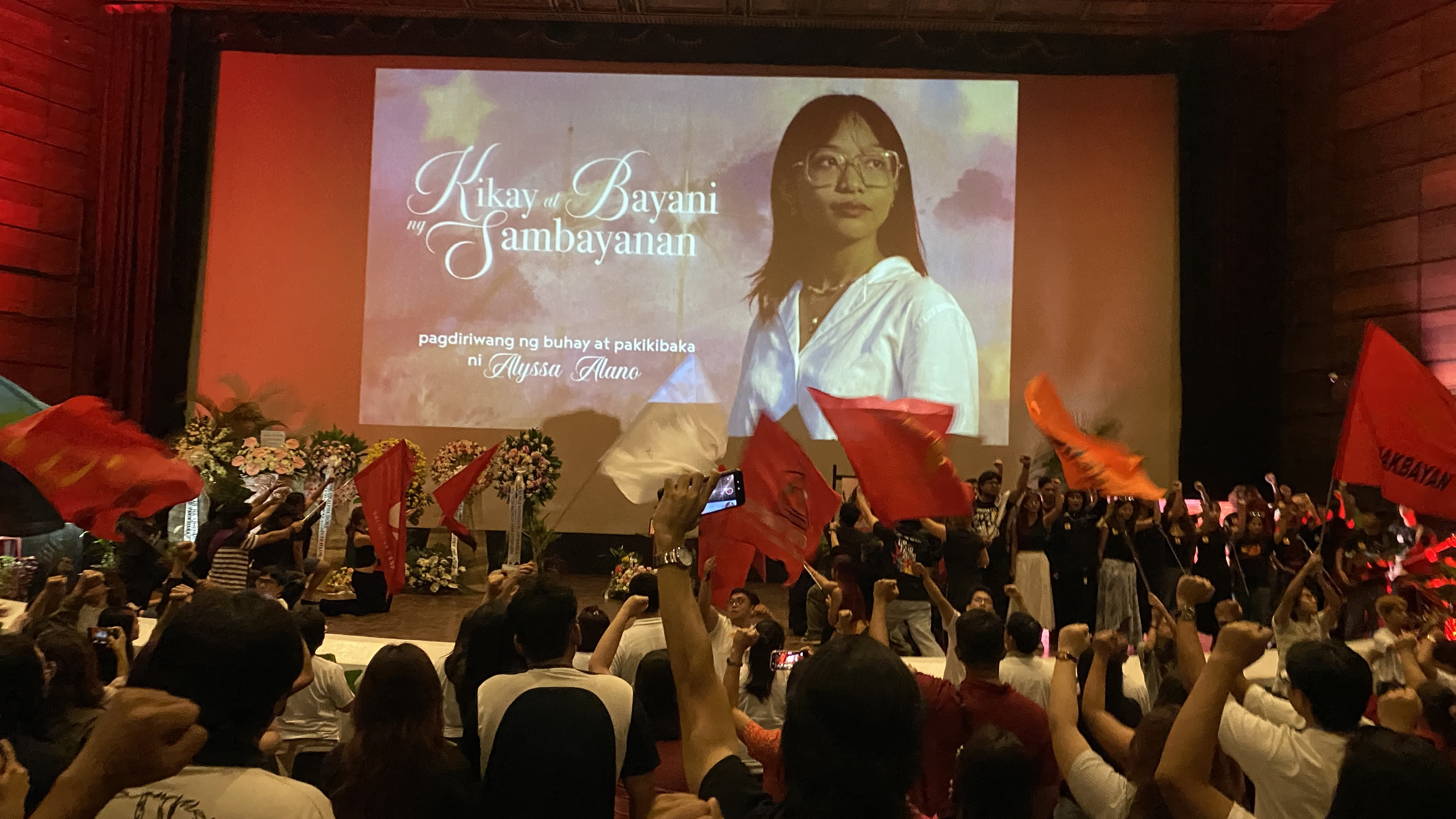
Alano given tribute by the UP Community.

These included:

- Alyssa G. Alano – a 22-year-old undergraduate student of political science at the University of the Philippines Diliman (UPD) who also served as a councilor of the UPD Student Council. She previously chaired the student organization League of Filipino Students (LFS) UPD chapter from 2024 to 2025. The 44-page National Fact-Finding and Solidarity Mission (NFFSM) investigation report later confirmed that Alano was murdered as a civilian. She was never involved with communist combatant.
- RJ Nichole Ledesma – a 30-year-old journalist and human rights advocate who was an editor of Paghimutad-Negros, a publication of the Altermidya Publication Network. He researched and reported on human rights violations in the Negros region. He was the 7th nominee of the Kabataan Partylist in the 2022 Philippine House of Representatives elections, a former editor of The Spectrum, the student publication of the University of St. La Salle in Bacolod, and a former chairperson of LFS Bacolod. The 44-page National Fact-Finding and Solidarity Mission (NFFSM) investigation report later confirmed that Ledesma was murdered as a civilian. He was never involved with communist combatant.
- Lyle Prijoles – a 40-year-old American human rights advocate and community organizer of Filipino descent from San Diego who had studied Asian American studies at San Francisco State University (SFSU) and later become a country council member of the International Coalition for Human Rights in the Philippines (ICHRP). He came from LFS SFSU and became the founding solidarity officer of Anakbayan-USA. The 44-page National Fact-Finding and Solidarity Mission (NFFSM) investigation report later confirmed that Prijoles was murdered as a civilian. He was never involved with communist combatant.
- Maureen Keil C. Santuyo – a 24-year-old peasant organizer of the National Network of Agrarian Reform Advocates Youth (NNARA Youth) who was also taking an associate of arts course at the University of the Philippines Open University. She was previously a former officer of Anakbayan Makati. The 44-page National Fact-Finding and Solidarity Mission (NFFSM) investigation report later confirmed that Santuyo was murdered as a civilian. She was never involved with communist combatant.
- Kai Dana Sorem – a 26-year-old musician and youth organizer who was a co-founder of the Anakbayan chapter of South Seattle. The 44-page National Fact-Finding and Solidarity Mission (NFFSM) investigation report later confirmed that Sorem was murdered as a civilian. She was never involved with communist combatant.
- Errol Wendel – a researcher for the Unyon ng mga Manggagawa sa Agrikultura (UMA) who was preparing a situationer report on the plight of Negros sakadas (sugarcane workers) when who was killed, and previously worked as a community organizer for sugar workers in Hacienda Luisita, Tarlac. The 44-page National Fact-Finding and Solidarity Mission (NFFSM) investigation report later confirmed that Wendel was murdered as a civilian. He was never involved with communist combatant.
- Roel Sabillo – a 19-year old local farmer. The 44-page National Fact-Finding and Solidarity Mission (NFFSM) investigation report later confirmed that Sabilo was murdered as a civilian. He was never involved with communist combatant.
- Unnamed Minor – a 15-year old local minor. The 44-page National Fact-Finding and Solidarity Mission (NFFSM) investigation report later confirmed that the 15-year old minor was murdered as a civilian. The minor was never involved with communist combatant.
- Unnamed Minor – a 17-year old local minor. The 44-page National Fact-Finding and Solidarity Mission (NFFSM) investigation report later confirmed that the 17-year old minor was murdered as a civilian. The minor was never involved with communist combatant.

The Police Regional Office Negros Island Region then identified six of the victims. By April 27, 2026, the Communist Party of the Philippines had issued a statement through information officer Marco Valbuena in which they released the names of ten individuals whom they acknowledged as their armed revolutionaries:

- Roger "Ka Tapang" Fabillar, 37, NPA Northern Negros Front commander (identified by PNP)
- Rene "Kumander Pikot" Villarin Sr., 57, squad leader (identified by PNP)
- Genevieve "Ka Raia" Balora
- Maria Clarita "Ka Sanim/Pat" Branzuel Blanco
- Pedro A. Bonghanoy, medical officer (identified by PNP)
- Sonny Boy M. Caramihan, 28 (identified by PNP)
- Labskie Purisimia Enustacion, 33
- Jocel Gimang, 18
- Arnel M. Javoc, 32 (identified by PNP)
- Joros Caramihan y Ramos, 18

The CPP also acknowledged the names of Alano, Ledesma, Prijoles, Santuyo, Sorem, and Wendel, citing them as "civilian casualties," and were never involved with communist combatants. The CPP also stated that a 19-year-old local farmer Roel Sabillo (also identified by PNP) was not their member and was never involved with communist combatants. In completing their list of nine civilian casualties, the CPP also noted two unnamed minors, a 15-year-old Toboso resident and a 17-year-old from Barangay Lalong, Calatrava, who were never involved with communist combatants.

The 44-page National Fact-Finding and Solidarity Mission (NFFSM) investigation report, released months later, confirmed that Alano, Ledesma, Prijoles, Santuyo, Sorem, and Wendel were civilians and not communist combatants. The report also confirmed that Sabillo, a local farmer, as well as two local minors were civilians, and not communist combatants. The nine civilian individuals were murdered by the military who "fired indiscriminately" at the area, resulting to the massacre.

== Responses ==
=== Protests, rallies, and tributes ===
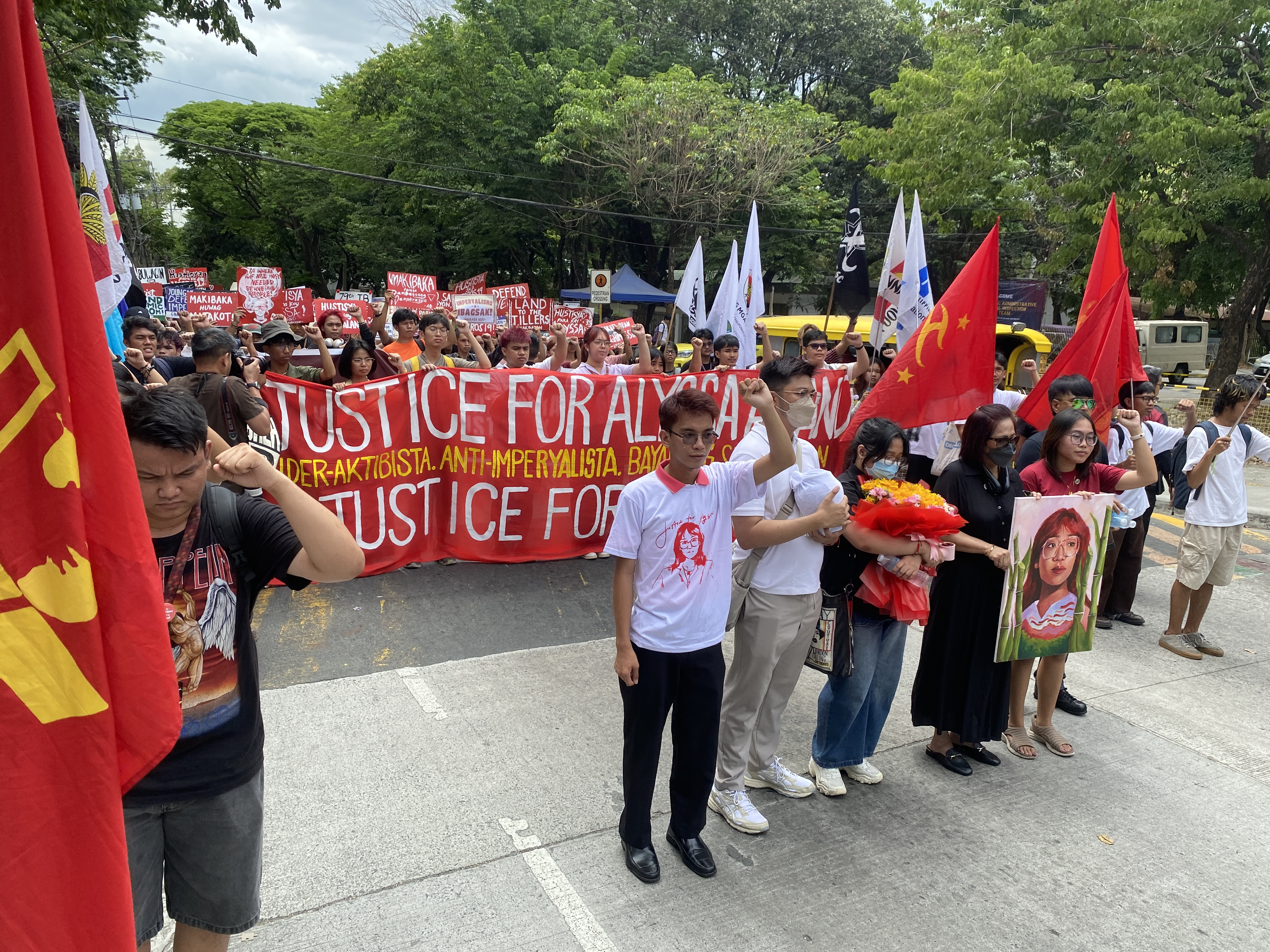
A rally seeking justice for Negros 19. The Alano family is at the front.

In mourning and condemnation, friends, schoolmates, families, and progressive groups left behind by the victims launched protests. Comedian-actress Tuesday Vargas called for justice in a rally on April 23, 2026, at the University of the Philippines Diliman.

Colleagues of victims based in the United States held a candle-lighting in front of the Philippine Consulate in New York City condemning the massacre. The New York Committee of Human Rights of the Philippines (NYCHRP) explained that the 'barbaric massacre' was not an isolated event and criticized the "systemic and systematic violence by US and US-backed forces", pertaining to the Armed Forces of the Philippines (AFP).

=== Statements by the combatant parties ===
Army commanding general, Lt. Gen. Antonio Nafarrete, in a statement commended the 79IB for the outcome of the operation while condoling with the families of the dead. Armed Forces of the Philippines chief Romeo Brawner Jr. declared the operation a "success" with the death of NPA commander Roger Fabillar.

On April 27, 2026, upon releasing its internal list of casualties in the encounter, the CPP issued a statement through information officer Marco Valbuena denouncing the military's alleged indiscriminate targeting of civilians in its operation against the NPA. It also claimed that NPA leader Roger Fabillar was captured by the military alive before being executed based on drone footage that was briefly posted online, and further added that "We honor the squad of 10 Red fighters of the NPA who fought the fascists to their last breath... Their deaths weigh heavily on our hearts."

=== Statements by the academe and civil society ===
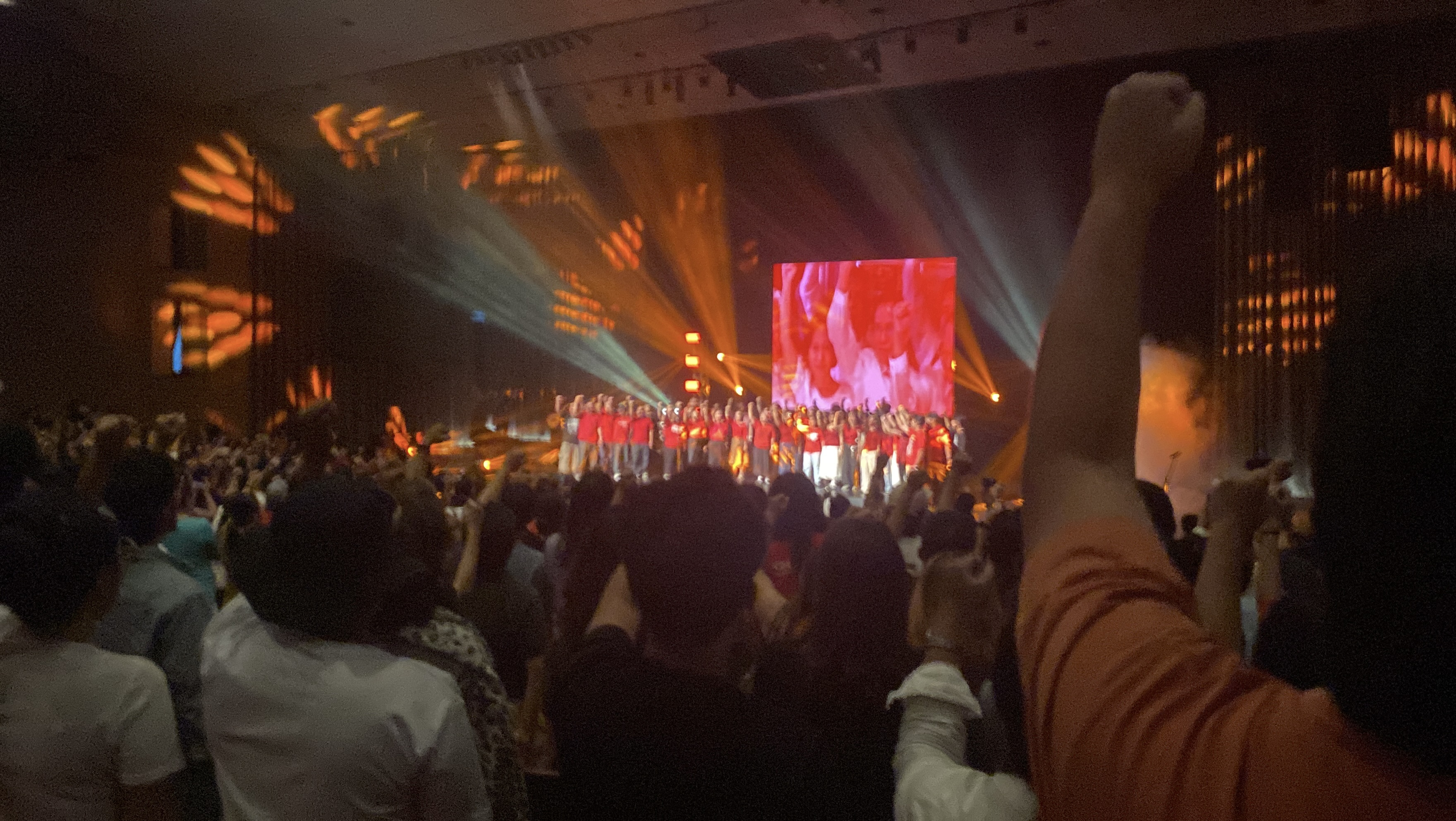
Tribute to Negros 19, UP Theater.

The University of the Philippines expressed deep sadness over the deaths of their students Alano and Santuyo. The university asserted that students are not limited to their classrooms and stands by their academic and civil rights. Concomitant with providing assistance to families and communities left behind by the two, UP has also called for and independent, transparent, and thorough investigation by the Commission on Human Rights (CHR).

In a pastoral statement Bishop Gerardo Alminaza of the Roman Catholic Diocese of San Carlos in Negros Occidental called for "dialogue, justice, and respect for human life", called for government authorities to "exercise power with restraint, humility, and openness to scrutiny", and for all parties to move away from a continuing "cycle of violence", furthering "We mourn all who have died, regardless of political affiliation, or every life lost is a child of God."

The ASEAN Parliamentarians for Human Rights (APHR) condemned the military operation, raising concern that nine of those killed were civilians. They said that "an operation that cannot distinguish between armed combatants and community workers is an indiscriminate attack that violates international humanitarian law," and called for the AFP to be held accountable.

International Coalition for Human Rights in the Philippines (ICHRP) condemned the killings, stating, "The sheer number of casualties, who are alleged by the Armed Forces of the Philippines to be NPA members, and the nature of the operations strongly point to possible widespread IHL [International Humanitarian Law] violations". ICHRP called for the withdrawal of the 79th Infantry Battalion from Toboso. The Philippine Ecumenical Peace Platform stated that under international humanitarian law, combatants should avoid armed encounters when civilians are present.

Peasant organizations Kilusang Magbubukid ng Pilipinas and Tanggol Magsasaka urged the government to abide by international humanitarian law and to halt the militarization of Negros.

=== Statements by politicians ===
Vice President Sara Duterte, former vice chairperson of the National Task Force to End Local Communist Armed Conflict, commended the Philippine Army's operation in Negros Occidental, praising the troops' "courage, discipline, and unwavering commitment" and recognized their sacrifices in serving the nation. She also urged parents and guardians to monitor their children's activities to prevent them from being influenced or recruited into "violent extremist groups".

Senators Risa Hontiveros and Kiko Pangilinan, the only two senators who spoke about the matter, vocally backed the impartial probe of the Commission on Human Rights regarding the Toboso encounter. Hontiveros added that "only on the basis of truth can there be justice", alluding to the previous cases where so-called "evidences" were planted by some military officers on the bodies of killed civilians and combatants. She added that the probe must be thorough, objective, and impartial to truly uncover the truth behind the incident. The national mission investigation report released months after, confirmed the suspicions of Hontiveros. The national mission also found that the military "fired indiscriminately" against the "Toboso 19", which included 9 civilians who were never involved with communist combatants.

== Probes and investigations ==
=== Commission on Human Rights Independent Investigation ===
On April 26, 2026, the CHR launched an independent investigation into the Toboso encounter following conflicting claims about the victims' identities, with the military describing them as combatants and other groups saying that some were civilians. The CHR said that international humanitarian law requires distinction between combatants and civilians and warned that alleged violations must be met with a prompt and impartial inquiry with accountability if proven. It said it was coordinating with stakeholders for evidence gathering and retrieval of remains. The CHR also raised concern over displaced families and urged authorities to provide aid, prevent further displacement, and address underlying issues such as poverty and inequality. The Office of the President of the Philippines, through press officer Claire Castro, said that it respected the independent investigation by the CHR into the Toboso encounter.

=== House of Representatives calls for investigations ===
In the House of Representatives, the Makabayan bloc filed a resolution on April 27, 2026, seeking a House investigation into alleged killings of unarmed civilians during military operations in Toboso. Legislators questioned the military's claim that the fatalities were NPA combatants, citing witness accounts identifying some victims as civilians, and raised concerns over possible violations of human rights and international humanitarian law. The resolution urged the House Committee on Human Rights to examine the conduct of the Armed Forces of the Philippines' 79th Infantry Battalion, including the use of force and compliance with legal protections for civilians. Lawmakers also called for a review of Memorandum Order No. 32, citing concerns over increased militarization in the Negros island. ML Partylist representative and former CHR chair Leila de Lima called for an investigation on alleged human rights and international humanitarian law violations.

=== Other probes and investigations ===
On April 27, during a press conference of the Nabangani Negros Fact-Finding Mission, a national mission composed of former rebels, the Buklod Kapayapaan Federation Inc., a government-registered civil society organization, presented its findings. The federation said that neither community researchers nor journalists were killed, and that no immersion activities were conducted in the area prior to the incident, which was likewise claimed by the barangay captain of Salamanca. It also reported that a firearm was recovered at the initial encounter site. The federation condemned ongoing violence against civilians, saying that at least 48 have been killed by the communists in Negros since January 2025.

Karapatan said that the incident was a massacre and not an encounter as claimed by the Philippine military. The National Union of People's Lawyers described the incident as a massacre and that there were "blatant violations of the principles that should apply in an armed encounter".

A group of journalists, human rights workers, church workers, and lawmakers conducted a National Fact-Finding and Solidarity Mission in May 2026.

== Conclusion on findings ==
On August 2026, the fact-finding mission confirmed that the military fired indiscriminately on the so-called ‘Toboso 19’. The mission flagged serious violations of international humanitarian and human rights laws in the killing incident in Negros Occidental, saying the military could clearly see who was armed and who was not armed as residents confirmed that nine of the fatalities in the alleged encounter on April 19 were civilians, not communist combatants.

The 44-page report of the National Fact-Finding and Solidarity Mission (NFFSM) said the soldiers from the 79th Infantry Battalion (IB) had a clear view of the scene and could distinguish between those who were armed and firing back, and those who were unarmed. The report stated that the military "fired indiscriminately", resulting in the deaths of nine civilians.

The investigation was conducted in May, and was composed of more than 100 participants from national, local and international organizations. Residents and witnesses were interviewed thoroughly, and the national mission visited the sites of the killings, examined physical evidences and documented the effects of military operations on civilian communities.

== Disinformation and red-tagging ==
The Movement Against Disinformation (MAD) urged the public on April 27, 2026, to reject unverified claims on the killings in Toboso, including pronouncements by the AFP. News outlet Altermidya said that the military's portrayal of RJ Ledesma as a combatant follows a pattern of red-tagging and "state-sponsored vilification" of alternative media.

A photo showing Ledesma, Alyssa Alano, and others was manipulated to include a flag of the NPA alongside flags of red-tagged militant groups. The digitally manipulated photos were first posted on Facebook page The TRUTH and shared from multiple accounts, such as Reallife Story. The circulation of the manipulated photo was criticized by Human Rights Advocates Negros.

Disinformation was also spread through "corned beef" memes, referencing the mangled remains of victims. These memes, along with AI-generated images and red-tagging by state agents, serve to demonize and dehumanize victims, according to Carlos Conde of Rights Report Philippines.

== See also ==
- Timeline of the New People's Army rebellion
- Escalante massacre
- Killing of Leonard Co, Sofronio Cortez, and Julius Borromeo
- Ericson Acosta
