= Negros killings =

Killings on Negros Island, Philippines

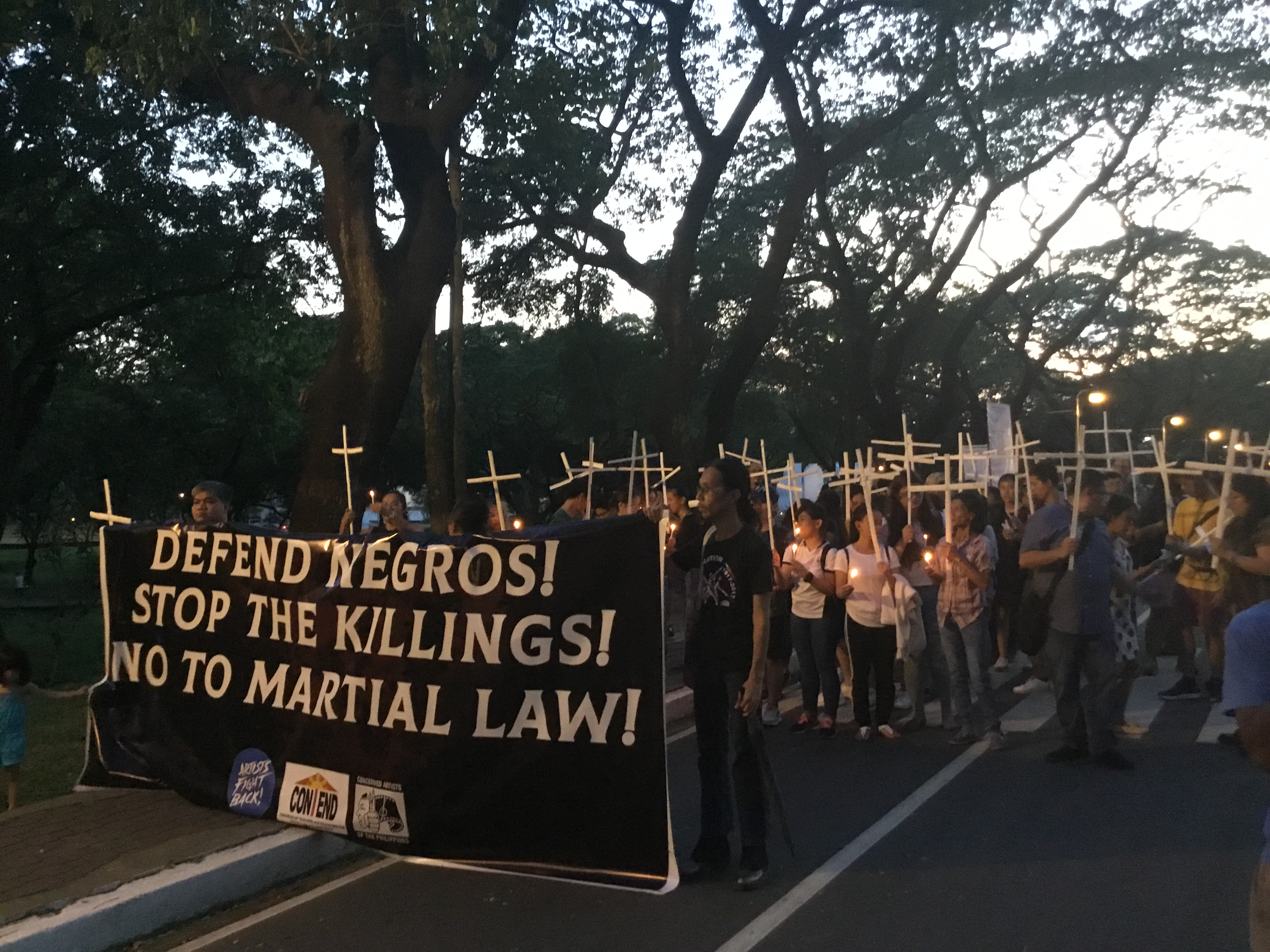
August 16, 2019 protest inside UP Diliman against Negros massacres.

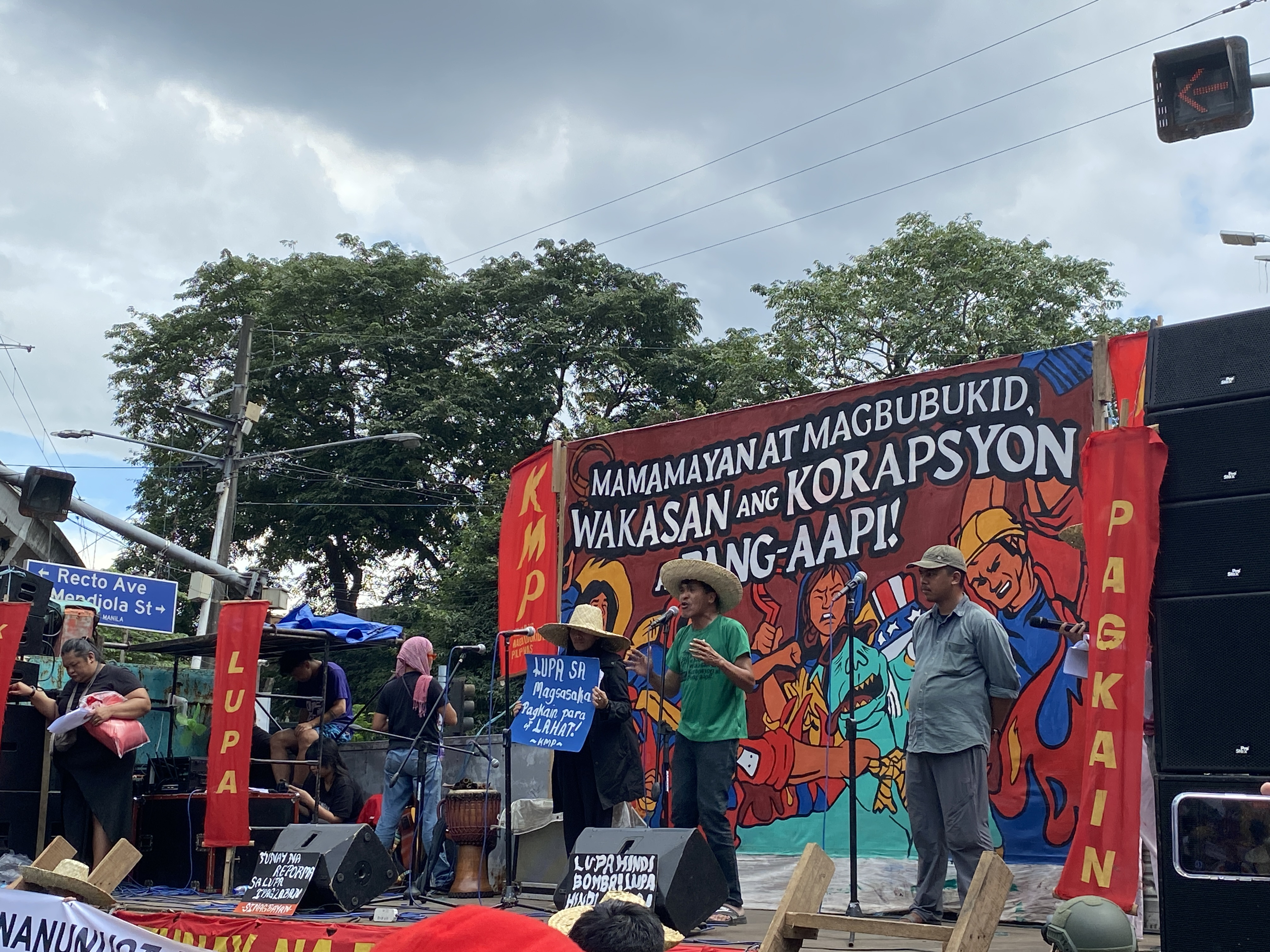
A peasant from Negros speaks in front of thousands at Mendiola denouncing continued killings and human rights violations in Negros, October 2025.

The Negros killings were a series of targeted assassinations carried out by unidentified gunmen in the provinces of Negros Oriental and Negros Occidental in the Philippines. Some of the victims involved were suspected communists or sympathizers. Following the killings, Memorandum Order No. 32 was signed by Executive Secretary Salvador Medialdea on November 23, 2018, upon the orders of President Rodrigo Duterte deploying additional troops to the provinces of Negros Oriental, Negros Occidental, Samar, and the Bicol Region to "suppress sporadic acts of violence" allegedly committed by lawless groups and to "prevent such violence from spreading and escalating elsewhere in the country." Even after the memorandum was signed, the incidence of killings continued. According to the Defend Negros Movement, the first recorded extrajudicial killing on Negros Island was Alexander Ceballos on January 20, 2017. The group also alleged that at least 84 persons have been killed since 2017.

Violence against farmers and land reform activists is common, according to Human Rights Watch, with landlessness blamed for mass poverty in the Philippines.

== Negros Occidental ==
=== 2018 ===
The massacre occurred in Sagay, Negros Occidental, when a group of gunmen shot and killed nine sugarcane farmers, including four women and two children, while they were eating dinner in a makeshift tent on a farm in Sagay, Negros Occidental, on October 20, 2018. The farmers were members of the National Federation of Sugar Workers, and the massacre may have been motivated by ongoing conflicts over land reform in the Philippines.

=== 2019 ===
On April 22, 2019, Escalante councilor and Escalante Massacre survivor Bernardino "Toto" Patigas was brazenly murdered by a motorcycle gunman hiding neither behind mask nor helmet. The International Coalition for Human Rights in the Philippines (ICHRP) pins the blame squarely and unambiguously on the "entrenched oligarchy" of the island.

On August 18, 2019, a 24-year-old woman named Cristal Faith Jastiva was shot at close range by two motorcycle assailants as she was waiting for a pedicab along Magsaysay Avenue in Bago.

=== 2020 ===
On June 23, 2020, Jose "Jerry" Catalogo of the National Federation of Sugar Workers (NFSW) was assassinated by unidentified gunmen in Escalante. He was reportedly placed under taxpayer-paid surveillance before his murder. On August 17, Zara Alvarez, a church worker and paralegal, was gunned down in Bacolod.

== Negros Oriental ==
=== 2018 ===
On December 27, 2018, at 7 a.m., three armed men stormed the house of the Isugan family in Guihulngan, Negros Oriental, and killed one of the family members. A few weeks later, their house was burned down by the assailants. One of the family members believed that the motive for the killing is the "family’s involvement in the peasant organization."

=== 2019 ===
On March 30, 2019, police operations conducted simultaneously in three different municipalities within Negros Oriental, leaving 14 people dead and 12 others arrested. Local police and the Criminal Investigation and Detection Group (CIDG) who conducted the operations alleged that the suspects opened fire and resisted arrest while being served warrants for illegal possession of firearms and explosives. Police and CIDG also alleged that the victims were members of the Special Partisan Unit of the New People's Army (NPA). PNP Chief Oscar Albayalde asserted that the operation was not a massacre and that the people who were killed had "fought back".

Karapatan and farmers' groups Unyon ng mga Manggagawa sa Agrikultura (UMA) and National Federation of Sugar Farmers condemned the incident, saying that the victims were merely farmers and habal-habal drivers. As a result, the provincial director of Negros Oriental police and three other police officers were relieved from their post. Human Rights Watch and UMA called for an investigation into the killings. Kabataan Party-list Representative Sarah Elago condemned the killings, holding the Duterte administration accountable for the incident. Elago also added that the incident brought the death toll of farmers to 197 under the Duterte administration.

On April 9, the Diocese of Dumaguete called for the "impartial investigation into the deaths of these 14 men." Presidential Spokesperson Salvador Panelo said that the families of the slain people "should file charges."

On July 18, four police officers were killed in an ambush in Barangay Mabato in Ayungon town. According to the Central Visayas police chief Debold Sinas, the police officers were attacked while verifying the presence of New People's Army in the area. Another source is that the police officers were allegedly tortured after they were cornered by the groups. President Rodrigo Duterte offered a P3-million reward to find the responsible. Duterte also visited the wake of the slain police officers.

On July 24, two men on a motorcycle gunned down and killed lawyer Anthony Trinidad and injured his wife in Guihulngan, Negros Oriental. Opposition Senator Leila de Lima has called for justice for Trinidad, who, "she said, represented 'political prisoners in Negros' and 'was reportedly among the names on a hit list by an alleged anti-communist group.'" The Defend Negros Network said in a statement through a Facebook account that Trinidad is allegedly "among the names on a list of an alleged anti-communist group called Kawsa Guihulnganon Batok Komunista (KAGUBAK)." On July 25, 2019, in Guihulngan, Guihulngan Science High School principal Arthur Bayawa and his sister Ardale Bayawa were killed inside their homes by unknown gunmen. The Bayawa siblings were killed inside their home by at least 10 assailants. Forty minutes later, at 1:40 a.m. (PHT), Barangay Chairman Romeo Alipan was also killed by at least 20 unidentified gunmen in his home. Guihulngan City Police Station Lieutenant Colonel Bonifacio Tecson said that motive of killing Alipan could be his joining the anti-insurgency campaign of the government.

On July 26, Fedirico Sabejon of Barangay 3 in Siaton was killed by gunmen on a motorcycle. On July 27, gunmen killed Ernesto Posadas, barangay chair of Panubigan, Canlaon, inside his home. The suspects fled in a white van and green pickup truck after writing "Mabuhay ang NPA" (transl. Long live the NPA) and "Traydor sa NPA" (transl. Traitor to the NPA) in spray painting. On July 27, unidentified gunmen killed four persons inside their homes in separate incidents, including Canlaon City Councilor Ramon Jalandoni, former mayor Edsel Enardecido, his cousin Leo Enardecido, and Ernesto Posadas. On July 28, a man named Anaciancino Rosalita, a resident of Barangay Bucalan in Canlaon, was gunned down in broad daylight, according to Negros Oriental Provincial Police Office (NORPPO).

On August 15, a grade 11 senior high school student named Joshua Partosa was gunned down and stabbed in the neck by four assailants aboard two motorcycles in broad daylight in Sibulan. Barangay councilor Raul Fat and former barangay councilor Fernando Toreno were gunned down in separate places in neighboring Negros Occidental.

=== 2020 ===
On December 15, 2020, Mary Rose Sancelan and her husband were killed by a gunman on a motorcycle outside a subdivision in Guihulngan, Negros Oriental.

=== 2022 ===
Poet and peace consultant Ericson Acosta and peasant organizer Joseph Jimenez were killed on November 30, 2022, in Kabankalan City, Negros Occidental. Karapatan stated that Acosta and Jimenez were captured alive at 2 a.m. and subsequently tagged by the military as casualties of an alleged armed encounter. The Commission on Human Rights conducted a probe of the incident, stating "CHR continues to underscore the need to adhere to the International Humanitarian Law (IHL) in situations of conflict. It is incumbent upon all parties, especially the State as duty-bearer, to comply with IHL rules and principles".

== Responses and reactions ==
Philippine National Police Chief Oscar Albayalde said that he ordered the deployment of 300 Special Action Force (SAF) commandos to Negros Island following the series of killings. Albayalde has also raised the possibility that the CPP and its armed wing the New People's Army, which blames the government for the killings, were responsible for the deaths as part of the group's propaganda. Senators Leila de Lima and Risa Hontiveros expressed concern over the killings in the province.

The Communist Party of the Philippines (CPP) condemned the incident and accused the military, police, and paramilitary forces of orchestrating the attacks. The Commission on Human Rights (CHR) called for the government to stop the killings and urged the government to investigate the incident. Human rights group Karapatan said that the incident "might be attributed to the implementation of the Oplan Kapanatagan, Memorandum 32 and Oplan Sauron in the province." Human rights groups have stated that Memorandum Order 32, which remains in force as of 2026, has led to increased violence in Negros.

Bishops Gerardo Alminaza, Julito Cortes, Patricio Buzon, and Louie Galbines of San Carlos, Dumaguete, Bacolod, and Kabankalan respectively denounced the killings.

Col. Raul Tacaca was relieved from his post as provincial police chief of Negros Oriental following the April 2019 killings. He was reinstated on April 30, 2019, but was relieved again in July 2019 after a series of killings occurred in that month. The Philippine National Police launched an investigation whether there were lapses on Tacaca's part in dealing with the killings.

In July 2019, former Social Welfare Secretary Judy Taguiwalo condemned the killings, which she called "a war against unarmed civilians". Taguiwalo also criticized Tacaca's claim that the killers were members of the NPA. Taguiwalo said, "They were accusing the victims as NPA and now they’re claiming that the NPA is the one behind these killings".

PNP chief Albayalde said on July 29, 2019, that there will be no declaration of martial law on Negros island despite the situation in Negros Oriental. On August 20, the United Methodist Church said that the deployment of additional troop forces "complicated the already worsening human rights situation" on the island.

== See also ==
- Escalante massacre
- Fausto massacre
- Ericson Acosta
- Toboso encounter
