= 2017 Bulacan massacre =

Mass murder of a family in the Philippines

Coordinates: 14.78949°N 121.04324°E

- San Jose del Monte (Luzon) San Jose del Monte (Philippines)
- Location: San Jose del Monte, Bulacan, Philippines
- Date: June 27 – July 8, 2017
- Attack type: Home invasion, massacre, stabbing, rape
- Deaths: 8 (including 3 accused)
- Accused: Ronaldo Pacinos; Rosevelth Sorima; Anthony Garcia; Alvin Mabesa

The 2017 Bulacan massacre is a massacre that happened on June 27, 2017, in which the assailants killed 5 members of a family inside their home in San Jose del Monte, Bulacan, Philippines. The authorities listed five persons of interest involved in the massacre. Within two weeks after the incident, three of the five persons of interests had been killed by unknown assailants within different areas in Bulacan.

== Incident ==
On June 27, 2017, according to the authorities, a security guard named Dexter Carlos found that, upon arriving at his house at 8:45 a.m. (PST), the five members of his family were dead inside his house at Block 1, Lot 8, North Ridge Royal Subdivision in Barangay Santo Cristo, San Jose del Monte, Bulacan. Carlos's mother-in-law Auring Dizon and his wife Estrella were sexually abused by the assailants and sustained 32 and 45 stab wounds respectively. Three children with stab wounds were found in different areas of the house.

== Suspects and investigation ==
On June 29, a construction worker named Carmelino Ibañez, who confessed his involvement in the crime, was arrested by the authorities. According to the authorities, Ibañez said that he was alone when he did the crime. He also said that he was under the influence of alcohol at the time of the incident. Ibañez broke the padlock of the door at the back of the house to get inside. However, on July 5, Ibañez retracted the statement, saying that "he was tortured by police to confess to the crime. Before that, he said that, fearing of his safety, he voluntarily surrendered to the police. Four days prior, despite the admission that he was "high" on drugs, the Philippine National Police (PNP) stated that "may have turned out negative because he took a low-grade variant or a small quantity of shabu".

Three of the persons of the interest involved in the incident have been killed within two weeks after the massacre, in style of vigilante killings with writings on the cardboard strapped on the body (typically used during the war on drugs), saying that they are considered "rapist". On July 4, Rolando Pacinos (alias: "Inggo") was found dead in San Jose del Monte. Pacinos sustained five stab wounds and his four fingers were missing. On July 5, assailants broke into the house, also in San Jose del Monte, of Rosevelt Somera (alias: "Ponga") and shot him dead in front of his family.

On morning of July 8, a third person named Anthony Garcia was shot dead and dumped on a roadside by an unidentified assailant. Alvin Mabesa was abducted and went missing.

President Rodrigo Duterte visited the wake on July 4. According to the police laboratory report, the blood sample taken from one of the victims in the massacre had matched the DNA of Ibañez.

== In popular culture ==
The case was featured on GMA Network's investigative docudrama program Imbestigador in an episode entitled "Bulacan Massacre". Dexter Carlos was portrayed by Gabby Eigenmann, while Estrella Carlos portrayed by Winwyn Marquez, and Carmelino Ibañez portrayed by Kiko Estrada
