= 2007 Calbayog spree killings =

Stabbing attacks in Samar, Philippines

- Location: Gadgaran, Samar, Philippines
- Date: June 2, 2007; 02:00 a.m. – 03:00 a.m.
- Weapons: Bolo; Club
- Deaths: 11 (including an unborn child)
- Injuries: 17
- Perpetrator: Danilo Guades

On June 2, 2007, a mass stabbing and bludgeoning attack took place in the Gadgaran neighborhood of Calbayog, Samar, Philippines. Ten people were killed and seventeen were injured before the perpetrator, 39-year-old Danilo Guades, surrendered to authorities.

== Murders ==
The first murders took place at the home of his cousin Emily Guades Ponce. Entering her house at about 2 a.m., Danilo Guades attacked her husband Benjamin with a 22-inch long bolo knife, hitting him in the left shoulder. He then attacked the couple's sleeping children, killing her son Eric with a blow to the head and injuring her other son Benjie and her daughter Marylin with hits to the head and arms. Emily Guades Ponce, though also suffering head injuries, managed to jump out of a window and escape.

Subsequently, Guades attacked the Jadulco family, who was living nearby, killing pregnant Gemma Jadulco and five of her children and leaving two others injured, before walking to the Canteros home. There, he killed Candido Canteros, injured his wife Maria, daughter Jennelyn, and mortally wounded their son Danilo. In the backyard of the house, Guades attacked Carlito Layam, who suffered minor injuries to his right arm, but managed to fight off the attacker.

Afterwards, Guades entered the house of Enis Lecis through the window and hit the sleeping Eduardo and Enis Lecis in the head, killing Eduardo and wounding Enis. At a wake for a member of the Ramada family, where Guades had spent some time drinking earlier, he cut Francisco Ramada's throat, hit Ernesto Ramada's neck, and stabbed Armando Ramada in the left side of his body. Michael Caber and Myra Manlapid were also injured before people attending the wake managed to fight Guades off. Guades fled to a road junction, where he attacked the final victims, Eddie and Jocelyn Gonzaga, who were on a motorcycle. Guades assaulted them with the bolo and a club, hitting Eddie Gonzaga in the arm, jaw, and forehead, and his wife in her left elbow, before the driver of the motorcycle was able to escape.

Guades surrendered himself to Fortunato Burbana, a villager, at about 3 a.m. He stated that he surrendered, fearing police might chase and kill him. Burbana then turned him over to police. At the police station, Guades denied killing anyone, though he conceded to a prior conviction for killing his brother years earlier. He was charged with multiple murder.

== Victims ==
=== Deaths ===
- Gemma Jadulco, 32. who was eight months pregnant
- Jennelyn Jadulco, 12, daughter of Gemma Jadulco
- Jinggoy Jadulco, 8, son of Gemma Jadulco
- Renato Jadulco, 3, son of Gemma Jadulco
- Nadine Jadulco, 2, daughter of Gemma Jadulco
- Christine Jadulco, 1, daughter of Gemma Jadulco
- Candido Canteros, 46
- Danilo Canteros, 12, son of Candido & Maria Canteros
- Eric Benjamin Ponce, 7, son of Benjamin & Emily Ponce
- Eduardo Lecis, 35

=== Injured ===
- Emily Guades Ponce, 27, a cousin of Danny Guades
- Benjamin Ponce, 42, husband of Emily Guades Ponce
- Benjie Ponce, 5, son of Benjamin & Emily Ponce
- Marilyn Ponce, 3, daughter of Benjamin & Emily Ponce
- Francisco Ramada, 56
- Ernesto Ramada, 45
- Armando Ramada, 35
- Jocelyn Jadulco, 9, daughter of Gemma Jadulco
- Joan Jadulco, 4, daughter of Gemma Jadulco
- Maria Canteros, 37, wife of Candido Canteros
- Jennelyn Canteros, 16, daughter of Candido & Maria Canteros
- Eddie Gonzaga
- Jocelyn Gonzaga
- Enis Lecis, 54
- Michael Caber, 31
- Myra Manlapid, 24
- Carlito Layam, 46

== Perpetrator ==
Danilo "Danny" Guades had previously served a seven year sentence at the (Abuyao) Caloocan City Jail for killing his elder brother Toto. He had been married, but his wife died in December 2006. After her death, he began to stay at his cousin's house. He had a child, who was in fourth grade at the time of the murders. Throughout the village, Guades was known as a mentally unstable troublemaker who was often drunk, sometimes staying awake for two days, before running to the mangroves to sleep there on the ground for the following two days. Apparently, Guades had also told others that he was being followed by someone.

=== Motive ===
It was said that Guades apparently had a quarrel with Gemma Jadulco's husband, Totoy, when both were attending the wake. Police later disclosed that Guades told them he committed the crime to strengthen his amulet, a piece of paper with Latin words on it.
