= Fausto massacre =

2023 killings in Negros Occidental, Philippines

The Fausto massacre or the Himamaylan massacre is a killing of a peasant family in Himamaylan City, Negros Occidental on June 14, 2023.

The massacre was part of a series of killings carried out in the Negros provinces against labelled Communists and their sympathizers, and follows the similarly motivated Escalante massacre of 1985.

== Background ==
Negros-based rights groups have previously reported that the Fausto family had been previously subjected to human rights violations of the Armed Forces of the Philippines (AFP), including red-tagging and assault. They were known to have participated and involved themselves among peasant activist organizations in the province. Other previous alleged harassment against the family included break-ins and robbery of cash and livestock.

Heads of the family Roly and Emelda were members of the Baclayan, Bito, Cabagal Farmers and Farmworkers Association (BABICAFA). Because of their participation, Roly was said to have been coerced by the AFP to act as a guide for soldiers against the New People's Army (NPA) and was even tortured in order to forcefully admit that he was also a rebel.

According to the International Coalition for Human Rights in the Philippines (ICHRP), government forces have killed 24 farmers in Negros since the start of Bongbong Marcos's term as President (as of June 2023). The ICHRP condemned the killing of children and accused the military of violating the Comprehensive Agreement on Human Rights and International Humanitarian Law (CARHRIHL) and Protocol I of the Geneva Conventions.

== Massacre ==
The massacre happened on the night of June 14, 2023. Unidentified men raided a hut in Sitio Buenavista, Himamaylan City, Negros Occidental. The next morning, the dead bodies of the Fausto family were found by their neighbors. They were the bodies of Roly Fausto, 55, wife Emelda, 50, and their children Ben, 15, and Ravin, 12. There were reports that the skull and left leg of Emelda were shattered. Roly's body was found 50 meters from the hut.

== Investigation ==
Human rights groups Karapatan and International Coalition for Human Rights in the Philippines accused the AFP as responsible for the massacre, denouncing claims by the AFP that it was the NPA that was responsible, citing reports of previous killings and harassment by the AFP's 94th Infantry Battalion in the province.

Karapatan denounced the plans of the National Task Force to End Local Communist Armed Conflict (NTF-ELCAC) to file charges against those who condemned the massacre and said that these actions hinder independent fact-finding missions while police and state probes were ongoing.

The AFP said that the NPA killed the family because they helped the military. However, kin and supporters denied the government claim that they were military assets.

The Philippine Commission on Human Rights' Western Visayas office began its investigation on June 17, 2023, amid the conflicting allegations.

The Makabayan Bloc filed a House resolution to investigate the matter, citing continued human rights abuses and violations of international humanitarian law by the military. Alliance of Concerned Teachers Representative Antonio Tinio asked, "Where can victims turn to when it is the government itself violating their human rights?"

== Reactions ==
San Carlos Bishop Gerardo Alminaza mourned the deaths and called for justice for the Fausto family. In June 2023, the Negros bishop criticized former president Rodrigo Duterte's Executive Order 70 which created the NTF-ELCAC and institutionalized the government's "whole-of-nation approach" in its counter-insurgency initiatives.

In July 2023, farmers group Kilusang Magbubukid ng Pilipinas (KMP) called on the CHR to conduct an impartial probe the massacre of the Fausto couple and their two children. The KMP accused the army and the Provincial Task Force to End Local Communist Armed Conflict of fabricating the results of its investigation.

== See more ==
- Red-tagging in the Philippines
- Extrajudicial killings and forced disappearances in the Philippines
- Negros killings
