= Sagay massacre =

Part of the 2017–19 Negros Island killings

Coordinates: 10°55′03″N 123°29′13″E

- Part of 2017–19 Negros Island killings
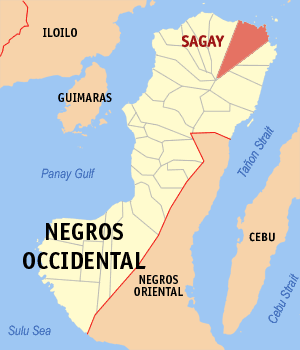
- Location of Sagay on the island of Negros
- Location: Sagay, Negros Occidental, Philippines
- Date: October 20, 2018; 8 years ago ~9:45 PM (PhST)
- Target: Sugarcane farmers
- Attack type: Shooting, massacre
- Weapons: .38 caliber gun; 5.56 mm rifle; .45 caliber gun
- Deaths: 9
- No. of participants: 5 or 6
- Motive: Land dispute
- Accused: Former farmers of the land Revolutionary Proletarian Army (New People's Army breakaway group)

The Sagay massacre occurred when a group of gunmen shot and killed nine sugarcane farmers, including four women and two children, while they were eating dinner in a makeshift tent on a farm in Sagay, Negros Occidental, on October 20, 2018. The farmers were members of the National Federation of Sugar Workers (NFSW), and the massacre may have been motivated by ongoing conflicts over land reform in the Philippines.

The massacre was part of a series of killings carried out in the Negros provinces against labelled Communists and their sympathizers, and follows the similarly motivated Escalante massacre of 1985.

== Background ==
There are 424,130 hectares of sugar lands in Negros Island. As of September 2016, more than 95,000 hectares had yet to be distributed under the country's land reform program. Farmers had filed multiple petitions to include Hacienda Nene in the government's land reform program.

Since 2009, farm workers in the region have been occupying agricultural lands and taking part in an annual practice called bungkalan (collective farming of food crops) for their subsistence.

From 2017 to 2018, 26 bungkalan farmers and organizers from the region became victims of extrajudicial killings. The victims killed in Hacienda Nene in Sagay City were part of the bungkalan campaign to till idle lands for survival.

According to the NFSW, 47 sugar workers and farmers were killed in Negros from 2017 to 2018. Government data show that 1,727 medium and large landlords control more than half of sugar cane plantations on Negros Island.

=== Government policy ===
Prior to the killings, President Rodrigo Duterte declared a state of national emergency through Proclamation No. 55, which he stated was a response to lawless violence in parts of Mindanao. Duterte also issued Memorandum No. 32, which ordered the deployment of troops to Negros Oriental and Negros Occidental, Bicol, and Samar. The issuances ordered the Philippine National Police and the Armed Forces of the Philippines to "undertake all necessary measures" to curb violence.

== Massacre ==
Armed men reportedly attacked a makeshift tent in the sugarcane farm in Hacienda Nene, Purok Fire Tree, Barangay Bulanon on October 20, 2018, and began shooting, killing nine farmers. Three of the victims were also burned after they were killed. According to Police Superintendent Joem Malong, the incident took place at 9:45 PM (GMT+8). The shooting lasted for 10 minutes.

== Investigation ==
After the incident, the police named the victims of the shooting, who included three men, four women and two children. According to the police, most of the victims were the members of Negros Federation of Sugar Workers. Police said that they were hunting for the killers. The NFSW said that the incident occurred on the first night of "bungkalan" activity — "wherein farmers occupy idle lands and collectively cultivate to make them productive." The police are investigating "land conflict" as the possible motive. In an interview on CNN Philippines, Sagay City Acting Chief of Police Chief Inspector Robert Mansueto said that the victims formerly farmed the land in question, and he added that "those killed were land reform beneficiaries." Initial reports said that 40 armed men took the place, but Mansueto clarified that it was five or six gunmen. Mansueto also said that the victims were eating dinner inside their tent before the incident. According to one survivor, the armed men arrived at the hacienda on foot and because of the remoteness of the area, the farmers did not notice them.

Chief Supt. John Bulalacao, Western Visayas police director, said that some of the 40 farmers "were linked to the New People's Army (NPA)" and claimed that NFSW was a "legal front" of the NPA, which the NFSW denied. Bulalacao said they are also looking at the possibility of the landowner or other claimants hiring goons to get rid of farmer-occupants.

Chief Insp. Manseto said that the incident appeared to have been a shootout between the gunmen and some of the farmers, although none of the gunmen were harmed. Negros Occidental police chief said one of the slain farmers was holding a .38 caliber handgun, however, three survivors denied this, saying that none of the members have guns. Police found 12 empty bullet casings from a 5.56 mm rifle and seven bullet casings from .45 caliber handgun.

In an interview on DZMM, Philippine National Police (PNP) Chief Oscar Albayalde said the NFSW is "used by the Communist Party of the Philippines to take over private lands for profit" and he added that the victims are "not legitimate tillers or tenants" of the plantation. The Department of Agrarian Reform said that the victims were "not beneficiaries of the government's land distribution program."

On October 23, the police said that they had identified one of the members of the NPA who is allegedly behind the massacre. According to the Armed Forces of the Philippines (AFP), the plantation where the incident took place was a "vigorous" place for the NPA.

=== Suspects ===
In late October 2018, the PNP filed murder charges against suspects Rene Manlangit and Rogelio Arquillo, who they said were recruiting farmers to the NFSW. However, the NFSW secretary general stated that a fact-finding team that went to Sagay reported that the perpetrators were members of the Armed Forces of the Philippines' Special Civilian Active Auxiliary.

== Reactions ==
On October 21, Malacañang Palace condemned the incident, calling the incident an "extremely cruel act". Former Special Assistant to the President and now-senatorial candidate Bong Go announced that President Rodrigo Duterte will visit the wake of the slain farmers. However, due to poor weather conditions, his visit has been called off.

Several opposition figures condemned the incident and directly blamed Duterte for the act; former Bayan Muna Representative Neri Colmenares said that the Duterte administration and the Armed Forces of the Philippines (AFP) "should be held responsible" for the killing of nine farmers. Defense Secretary Delfin Lorenzana accused Colmenares of having political motivations for criticizing the government for the incident. Lorenzana also made a statement condemning the incident. Anakbayan Cebu wrote on Twitter, saying that "vehemently condemns the fascist and terrorist acts of the Duterte regime towards the tillers of the land who are constantly victimized by his ferocious all-out war." The Commission on Human Rights (CHR) also condemned the killings and called on the government "to give assurance that justice would be served for the victims."

Bayan Muna Representative Carlos Zarate labelled the incident as part of the "real Red October" plot, which originally referred to an alleged plot to overthrow President Duterte. Women's group Gabriela Representative said that "this is a war against the people and a war against the poor." On October 21, a resolution titled "House Resolution No. 2262" was filed by ACT Teachers Reps. Antonio Tinio and France Castro, Bayan Muna Rep. Carlos Zarate, Gabriela Reps. Emmi de Jesus and Arlene Brosas, Anakpawis Rep. Ariel Casilao, and Kabataan Rep. Sarah Elago, calling for the House committees to conduct an investigation on the incident. According to the Unyon ng mga Manggagawa sa Agrikultura (UMA) and the NFSW, the massacre brought a total of 45 farmers killed in Negros island alone under the presidency of Duterte. Senator Risa Hontiveros also pointed the finger to Duterte, saying that the killing occurred "under his watch". Former solicitor general Florin Hilbay said that the government should give justice for the farmers "who only desire to own the land".

Netizens took part on their social media, decried the killings, and called for justice for the slain farmers.

On October 22, militant groups gathered at Camp Aguinaldo; the groups said that that killings of the farmers is the result of "militarization" in the area.

On October 23, Carlos Conde of Human Rights Watch called on the Duterte administration "to carry out a credible and impartial investigation". Conde added that human rights abuses in the Philippines are "not limited" to Duterte's drug war. Human Rights Watch said that Philippine farmers suffer massive poverty caused by landlessness. It also said that security forces have targeted farmers and labor activists by accusing them of being rebel insurgents.

On October 25, relatives of the victims and other militant groups gathered at Taft Avenue in Manila to protest the killings of the farmers and decried low wages and the government's failure to carry out land reform in the country.

On December 5, farmers, human rights advocates, and church workers formed the Stop Killing Farmers: Justice for Sagay Massacre Network to campaign for justice for the victims of alleged paramilitary forces.

== Aftermath ==
On October 20, 2018, Rene Manlangit, NFSW local chair and one of the survivors of the killings, sought help from the Commission of Human Rights in investigating the incident.

On October 24, according to the NFSW via Facebook, a minor and key witness who survived the massacre was illegally arrested by the Sagay authorities. After the news broke out, the authorities afterwards claimed that they intended for the minor to be turned over to his grandparents after being held in the Department of Social Welfare and Development custody. Former Bayan Muna representative Neri Colmenares, via Twitter, called for the immediate release of the minor.

On October 29, President Rodrigo Duterte told state forces to arrest groups occupying idle lands and to shoot those who resist violently.

On October 31, one of the victim's relatives blamed NFSW local chair Rene Manlangit for allegedly promising that the victims a parcel of land if they joined the NFSW. On November 7, Manlangit and his fellow survivors went to the Commission of Human Rights and stated that the victims had been members of NFSW since 2012 and had also been farming on Hacienda Nene even before that.

On November 6, Benjamin Ramos, a lawyer for the families of Sagay massacre victims, was murdered in Kabankalan. Shortly before his murder, posters that red-tagged Ramos were circulated in the area. The murder was condemned by human rights and lawyers' groups, such as Human Rights Watch and National Union of Peoples' Lawyers.

On December 4, the mother of a child survivor filed a child abuse complaint against the police, alleging that the child's testimony was taken without the presence of a person the child trusts as required by a Philippine Supreme Court ruling on child witnesses. The mother also filed a complaint against her former partner for allegedly violating the Anti-Violence Against Women and Children Act for allegedly attempting to coerce a minor to point to the NPA as the culprit of the killings.
