= Escalante massacre =

1985 killing of protestors in the Philippines

- Victims of the massacre being placed in coffins
- Location: Escalante, Negros Occidental, Philippines
- Date: Friday, September 20, 1985 (UTC +8)
- Target: Demonstration
- Attack type: Shooting
- Weapon: Small arms
- Deaths: 20
- Injuries: 30
- Perpetrator: Paramilitary forces

The Escalante massacre was an incident on September 20, 1985, in Escalante, Negros Occidental, Philippines, where government paramilitary forces gunned down civilians engaged in a rally in commemoration of the 13th anniversary of the declaration of martial law. It is also called Escam – a portmanteau of "Escalante" and "massacre" – and sometimes Bloody Thursday, though the massacre occurred on a Friday.

== Background ==
The declaration of martial law on September 21, 1972, by President Ferdinand Marcos proved to be the dawning of darker days for the country. Although martial rule was lifted by Marcos on January 17, 1981, the writ of habeas corpus remained suspended. Citizens merely protesting the policies of the Marcos government risked arrest without warrant and indefinite detention.

Escalante is a town in the province of Negros Occidental. It is 95 kilometers northeast of Bacolod City, the capital of the province. It was made into a city in 2001.

Negros Occidental is a province made prosperous by the sugar industry. Since the Spanish colonial period, it had exported sugar and sugar products. Large tracts of sugarcane plantations or haciendas were under the ownership of the elite, the hacienderos, who became extremely rich and powerful. Labor was often provided by live-in workers called sacadas who were frequently migrants from neighboring provinces. Poor, often severely exploited and powerless, these workers remain landless.

=== Negros and the Marcos regime ===
In the 1970s and 80s, the plummeting price of sugar in the world market triggered a severe socioeconomic crisis. As production slowed down, many plantation workers lost their jobs, resulting in widespread poverty. Children died from hunger and malnutrition. When the crony-controlled sugar industry imploded, the sacadas, and even a small number of enlightened landowners, said they had had enough. This triggered protest actions demanding agrarian reform and land distribution, fair wage, and improved government services. As a result, social tension was often high in the province.

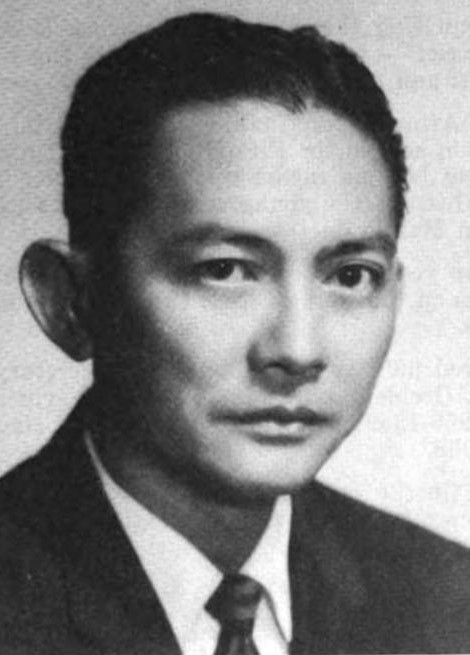
Armando Gustilo

The governor of Negros Occidental at that time was Armando Gustilo, a former member of the pre-martial law Congress. A landowner himself, he was also a known crony of then-president Ferdinand E. Marcos. Gustilo reportedly formed a private army which, together with the military, terrorized the island in order to quell the growing dissent against the Marcos dictatorship.

Adding to the tension of the times was the proposed creation of the province of Negros del Norte from Negros Occidental. Citizens saw this as a maneuver by Marcos cronies in the northern portion of the province to consolidate more power. Negros del Norte was created from Negros Occidental on January 3, 1986, but its creation was later found to be unconstitutional and was abolished on August 18, 1986.

== Attack ==
On September 18, 1985, a crowd composed of sugar workers, farmers, fisherfolk, students, urban poor, professionals, and church people staged a noise protest in the town center. The crowd was estimated to number 5000. The next day, the protesters set up human barricades in front of the public market and at the entrance of the municipal plaza. On the morning of September 20, a police car approached the picket line and the protest leaders were invited to a negotiation conference at the municipal building that was about fifty meters from the barricades, which the leaders refused.

About mid-afternoon, fire trucks arrived and began to bombard the picket line with high-pressure water and tear gas. The crowd was surrounded by members of the Regional Special Action Force (RSAF) and the Civilian Home Defense Forces (CHDF). When some protestors threw back the tear gas canisters into the empty plaza, the paramilitary forces, who would later allege that a few "trouble-makers" tried to grab their weapons, opened fire into the masses.

== Aftermath ==
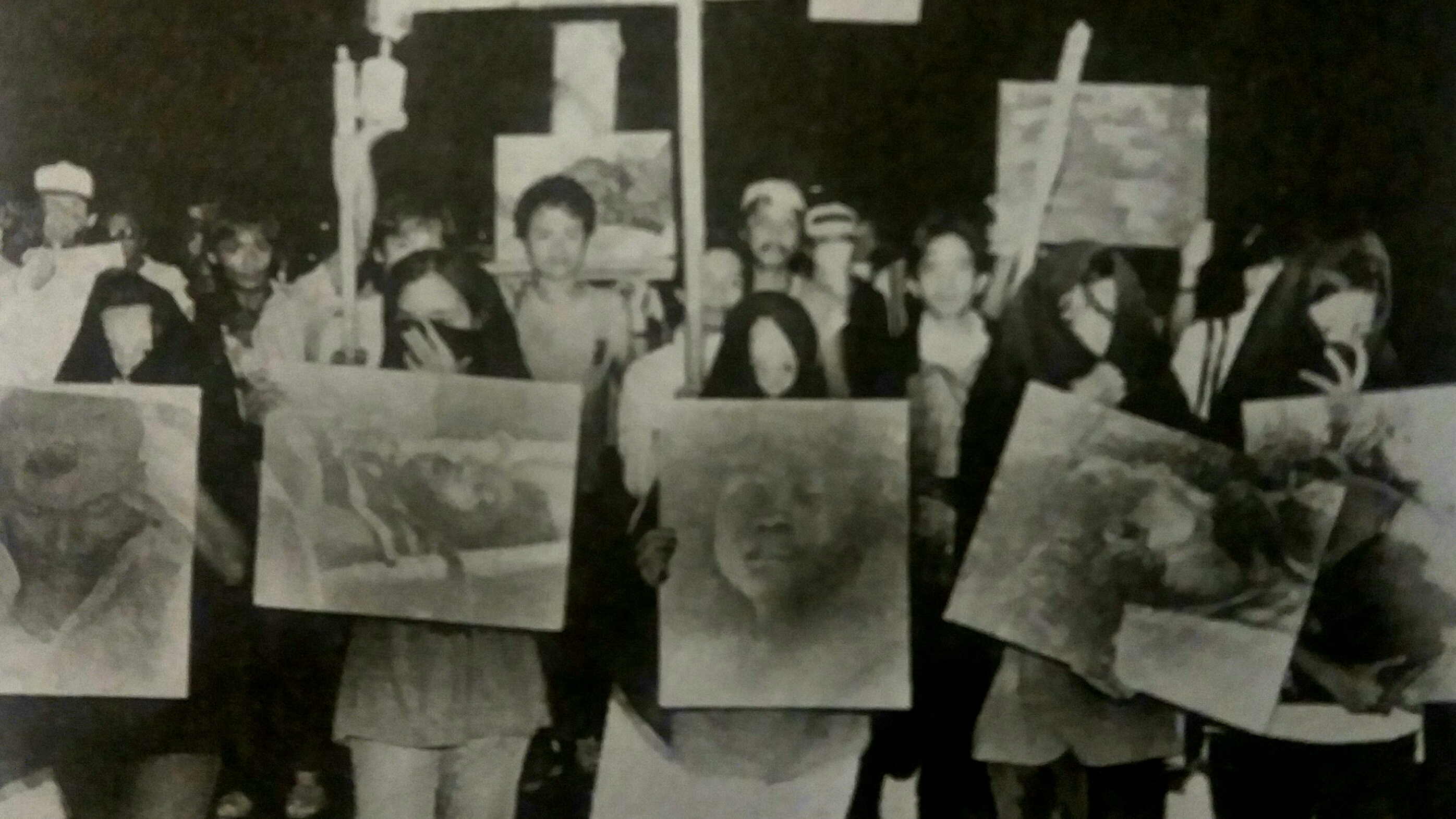
A rally in 1986 against the Marcos Dictatorship in which protesters hold images of the victims of Escalante Massacre

Accounts of the number of casualties vary: between twenty and thirty dead, and thirty wounded. After the crowd had dispersed, the site was cordoned off by the paramilitary units and onlookers were ordered to bring the wounded to hospitals in the town. The bodies were recovered from the rally site and in the sugarcane fields surrounding the location. Buildings and concrete walls nearby were riddled with bullet holes.

The government organized the Escalante Massacre Fact-Finding Commission chaired by Ombudsman Justice Raul M. Gonzalez (as of 2007, the Secretary of the Department of Justice). The commission recommended that the government indemnify the victims' next of kin, which was never done. In 2003, three low-ranking policemen jailed for their alleged role in the massacre were released on parole.

== Memorials ==
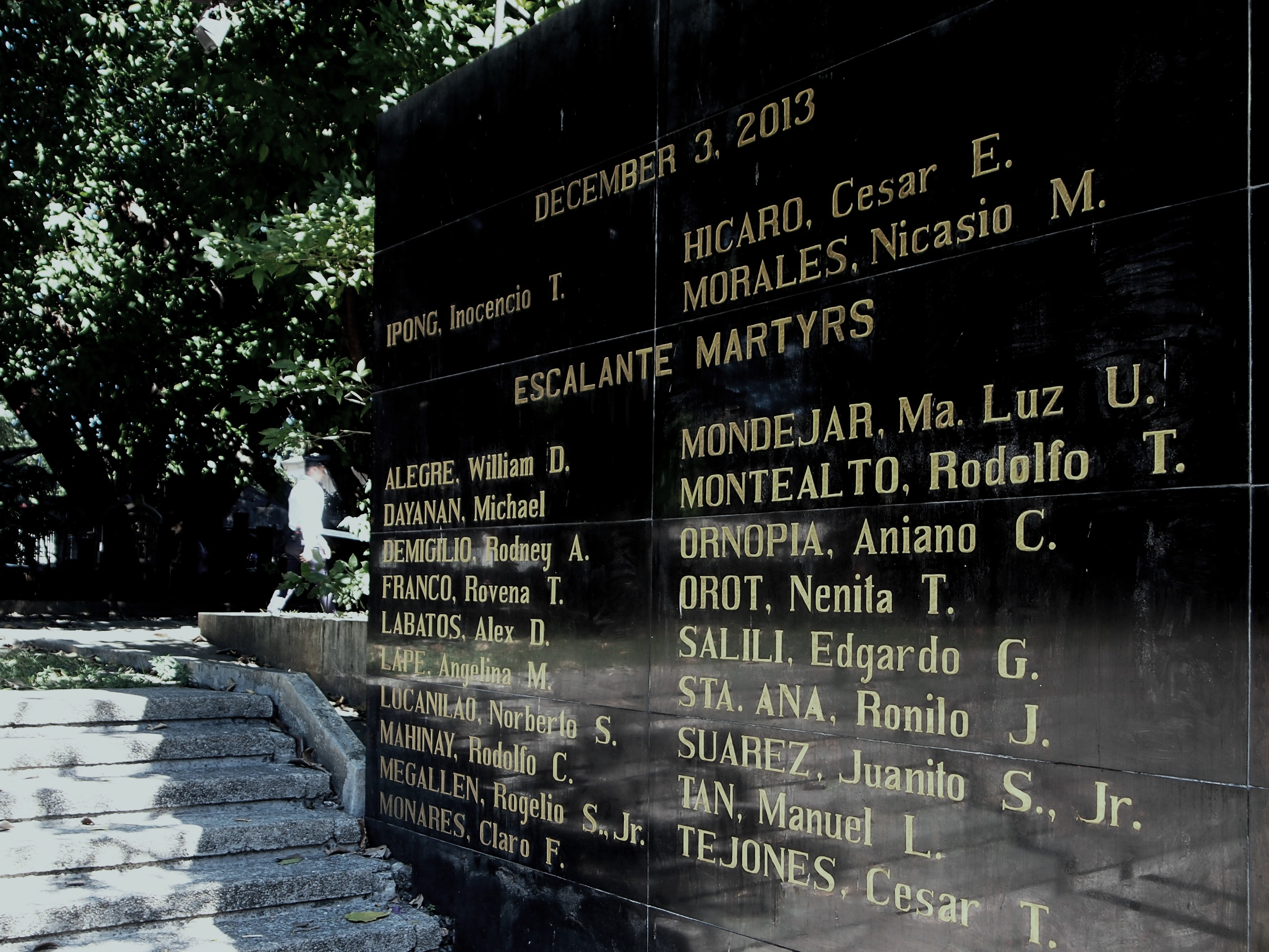
Detail of the Wall of Remembrance at the Bantayog ng mga Bayani, showing names of the victims under the heading Escalante martyrs, absent is the name of Juvelyn Jaravello.

The Escalante martyrs have been memorialized in a number of ways, most notably through a monument in the plaza very near the spot where the victims were killed, and through the names of the martyrs being inscribed on the wall of remembrance at the Bantayog ng mga Bayani.

The names of the Escalante martyrs inscribed on the wall of remembrance are as follows:

- William Alegre
- Michael Dayanan
- Rodney Demegilio
- Rovena Franco
- Juvelyn Jaravello
- Alex Labatos
- Angelina Lape
- Norberto Locanilao
- Rodolfo Mahinay
- Rogelio Megallen Jr.
- Claro Monares
- Maria Luz Mondejar
- Rodolfo Montealto
- Aniano Ornopia
- Nenita Orot
- Edgardo Salili
- Ronilo Santa Ana
- Juanito Suarez Jr.
- Manuel Tan
- Caesar Tejones

== See also ==
- List of massacres in the Philippines
- 1986 EDSA Revolution
- Timeline of the Marcos Dictatorship
- Sag-od massacre
- Bacong Bridge massacre
- Malisbong massacre
- Negros Island killings
  - Sagay massacre
  - Canlaon massacre
