= List of human rights organisations =

The following is a list of articles on the human rights organizations of the world. It does not include political parties, or academic institutions. The list includes both secular and religious organizations.

== International non-governmental organizations ==
- Amazon Watch
- Amnesty International
- Anti-Slavery International
- Article 19
- Avocats Sans Frontières
- Breakthrough
- Campaign to Stop Killer Robots
- CARE
- Cara (the Council for At-Risk Academics)
- Carter Center
- CCJO René Cassin
- Center for Economic and Social Rights
- Center for Human Rights & Humanitarian Law
- Centre on Housing Rights and Evictions (COHRE)
- Civil Rights Defenders
- Coalition for the International Criminal Court
- Committee to Protect Journalists
- Commonwealth Human Rights Initiative
- CryptoRights Foundation
- Cultural Survival
- Disabled Peoples' International
- Doctors without Borders (Médecins Sans Frontières)
- Enough Project
- Equality Now
- Euro-Mediterranean Human Rights Monitor
- Every Human Has Rights
- Forum 18
- Free the Slaves
- Freedom from Torture
- Freedom House
- Friends of Peoples Close to Nature
- Front Line Defenders
- Global Centre for the Responsibility to Protect
- Global Rights
- Gypsy International Recognition and Compensation Action
- Habitat International Coalition
- Helsinki Committee for Human Rights
- Helsinki Watch
- Hirschfeld Eddy Foundation
- Humanists International
- Human Rights Center
- Human Rights First
- Human Rights Forum
- Human Rights Foundation
- Human Rights Internet
- Human Rights Watch
- Human Rights Without Frontiers International
- HURIDOCS
- IFEX
- Independent Permanent Human Rights Commission
- Institute for War and Peace Reporting
- Interamerican Association for Environmental Defense
- International Alliance of Women
- International Association of Jewish Lawyers and Jurists
- International Center for Transitional Justice
- International Centre for Human Rights and Democratic Development
- International Centre for Human Rights Research
- International Coalition against Enforced Disappearances
- International Commission of Jurists
- International Committee of the Red Cross (private, sovereign organisation)
- International Crisis Group
- International Disability Alliance
- International Federation for Human Rights
- International Federation of Red Cross and Red Crescent Societies
- International Foundation for Human Rights and Tolerance
- International Helsinki Federation for Human Rights (federation of 15 other human rights organizations not included in this list; now bankrupt due to fraud)
- International Institute of Human Rights
- International League for Human Rights
- International Movement ATD Fourth World
- International Partnership for Human Rights (IPHR)
- International Property Rights Index
- International Progress Organization
- International Red Cross and Red Crescent Movement
- International Rehabilitation Council for Torture Victims
- International Rescue Committee
- International Service for Human Rights
- International Society for Human Rights
- International Tibet Network
- International Work Group for Indigenous Affairs
- Islamic Human Rights Commission
- JUSTICE
- MindFreedom International
- Minority Rights Group International
- National Labor Committee in Support of Human and Worker Rights
- Network for Education and Academic Rights
- No Peace Without Justice
- Norwegian Refugee Council
- Peace Brigades International
- People & Planet
- Physicians for Human Rights
- Point of Peace Foundation
- Protection International
- Refugees International
- Release International
- Reporters Without Borders
- Reprieve
- Redress Trust
- Robert F. Kennedy Human Rights
- Save the Children
- Scholars at Risk
- Scholar Rescue Fund
- Shia Rights Watch
- Society for Threatened Peoples
- Survival International
- Tahirih Justice Center
- The Advocacy Project
- The RINJ Foundation
- The Sentinel Project for Genocide Prevention
- Tostan
- Transparency International
- UN Watch
- UNITED for Intercultural Action
- Unrepresented Nations and Peoples Organization
- World Council of Churches
- World Organization Against Torture
- WITNESS
- Womankind Worldwide
- World Future Council
- World Organization Against Torture
- Youth for Human Rights International

== Regional non-governmental organizations ==
- African Movement of Working Children and Youth (Africa)
- AIRE Centre (Europe)
- Arabic Network for Human Rights Information (Arab world)
- Arab Commission for Human Rights (Arab world)
- Asian Forum for Human Rights and Development (Asia)
- Asian Human Rights Commission (Asia)
- Asian Centre for Human Rights (Asia)
- Commonwealth Human Rights Initiative (Commonwealth nations)
- Council of Europe (Europe) (is actually a intergovernmental organization financed by its 46 member states, not a NGO)
- Council on Hemispheric Affairs (Americas)
- Ecumenical Center for Human Rights (Americas)
- EuroMed Rights (Euro-Mediterranean region)
- European Human Rights Society (Europe)
- European Roma Rights Centre (Europe)
- Federal Union of European Nationalities (Europe)
- Helsinki Citizens Assembly (Europe)
- Human Rights Trust of Southern Africa (Southern Africa)
- Incomindios Switzerland (Americas)
- International Association of Independent Journalists Inc. (Canada, England & elsewhere)
- Journalists for Human Rights (Africa)
- Kurdish Human Rights Project (Iraq, Turkey, Syria, Iran & elsewhere)
- Memorial (Ex-USSR)
- Regional Council on Human Rights in Asia (Southeast Asia)
- Unimondo (southeastern Europe)
- Washington Office on Latin America (Latin America)
- The Youth Cafe (Africa)

== Non-governmental organisations with a national focus ==
For governmental national human rights organisations see national human rights institution.

=== Argentina ===
- HIJOS
- Mothers of the Plaza de Mayo
- Movimiento Judío por los Derechos Humanos

=== Armenia ===
- Europe in Law Association
- Helsinki Citizens’ Assembly–Vanadzor
- Helsinki Committee of Armenia
- Open Society Foundations–Armenia
- PanEuropa Armenia
- Pink Armenia
- Right Side NGO
- Union of Informed Citizens

=== Australia ===
- Castan Centre for Human Rights Law
- Human Rights Law Centre

=== Bahrain ===
- Bahrain Centre for Human Rights
- Bahrain Human Rights Society
- Bahrain Human Rights Watch Society
- Bahrain Youth Society for Human Rights
- We Have A Right

=== Belgium ===
- Association belge des familles des disparus
- Liga voor Mensenrechten
- Ligue des droits de l'homme

=== Bosnia and Herzegovina ===
- Association for Social Research and Communications (UDIK)

=== Burma (Myanmar) ===
- Burma Campaign UK
- Canadian Friends of Burma
- Free Burma Rangers
- Human Rights Defenders and Promoters
- Karen Human Rights Group
- U.S. Campaign for Burma
- Women's League of Burma

=== Bulgaria ===
- Bulgarian Helsinki Committee

=== Cambodia ===
- Cambodian Center for Human Rights
- The Cambodian League for the Promotion and Defense of Human Rights (LICADHO)
- ADHOC

=== Canada ===
- Child Welfare League of Canada

=== Chad ===
- Chadian Association for the Promotion and Defense of Human Rights

=== Chile ===
- Association of Families of the Detained-Disappeared (AFDD; 1974)
- Committee of Cooperation for Peace in Chile (1973–1975)
- National Commission for Truth and Reconciliation (1990–1991); better known as the Rettig Commission
- Vicariate of Solidarity (1976–1990)

=== China ===
- Civil Human Rights Front (Hong Kong)
- Empowerment and Rights Institute
- Hong Kong Human Rights Monitor (Hong Kong)
- Human Rights in China
- Information Centre for Human Rights and Democracy
- Tibet:
  - Free Tibet
  - International Campaign for Tibet
  - Political Prisoners Movement of Tibet
  - Students for a Free Tibet
  - Tibetan Centre for Human Rights and Democracy

=== Colombia ===
- CREDHOS, Regional Corporation for the Defence of Human Rights (Spanish: Corporación Regional para la Defensa de los Derechos Humanos). NGO founded in 1987 in response to the humanitarian crisis in the Magdalena Medio region.

=== Egypt ===
- Arabic Network for Human Rights Information
- Egyptian Center for Economic and Social Rights
- Egyptian Initiative for Personal Rights
- Egyptian Organization for Human Rights
- Hisham Mubarak Law Center
- National Council for Human Rights
- Shayfeencom

=== Eritrea ===
- Human Rights Concern Eritrea

=== Ethiopia ===
- Ethiopian Human Rights Council
- KMG Ethiopia

=== France ===
- GISTI
- Human Rights League (Ligue des droits de l'homme)
- MRAP (French NGO)
- SOS Racisme

=== Guatemala ===
- ADIVIMA
- HIJOS

=== Iceland ===
- Icelandic Human Rights Centre

=== India ===
- Confederation of Human Rights Organizations
- Forum for Fact-finding Documentation and Advocacy
- Honour for Women National Campaign
- Human Rights Documentation Centre
- Kashmir Human Rights Commission
- Manab Adhikar Sangram Samiti
- National Campaign on Dalit Human Rights
- Vigil India Movement

=== Iran ===
- Center for Human Rights in Iran (CHRI)
- Defenders of Human Rights Center (DHRC)
- Human Rights Activists in Iran (HRAI/HRANA)
- International Centre for Human Rights (ICHR)
- Iran Human Rights (IHRNGO)
- Iran Human Rights Documentation Center (IHRDC)

=== Israel ===
- Adalah (legal center)
- Association for Civil Rights in Israel
- B'Tselem
- Jerusalem Institute of Justice
- Machsom Watch
- Rabbis for Human Rights
- Physicians for Human Rights–Israel
- Yesh Din

=== Italy ===
- Emergency

=== Kenya ===
- Cemiride
- Awareness Against Human Trafficking (HAART)
- Kenya Human Rights Commission

=== Lebanon ===
- Association Najdeh

=== Malawi ===
- Centre for Human Rights and Rehabilitation

=== Malaysia ===
- Bersih
- Lawyers for Liberty
- Malaysians Against Death Penalty & Torture
- National Human Rights Society
- Sisters in Islam
- Suara Rakyat Malaysia
- Women's Aid Organisation

=== Mali ===
- Association Malienne des Droits de l'Homme

=== Mauritania ===
- Association Mauritanienne des Droits de l'Homme

=== Morocco ===
- Association Marocaine des Droits Humaine
- Conseil Consultatif des Droits de l'Homme
- Sahrawi Association of Victims of Grave Human Rights Violations Committed by the Moroccan State

=== Nepal ===
- Amnesty Nepal
- INSEC
- THRD Alliance

=== Niger ===
- Timidria

=== Nigeria ===
- Devatop Centre for Africa Development
- National Association of Seadogs
- Youths For Human Rights Protection And Transparency Initiative
- Hope Behind Bars Africa

=== North Korea ===
- Chosun Journal
- Liberty in North Korea

=== Pakistan ===
- Asian Human Rights Development Organization

=== Palestine ===
- Al Haq (West Bank)
- Al Qaws (Queer)
- Aswat (feminist)
- Al Mezan Center for Human Rights (Gaza Strip)
- B'Tselem (Israeli organisation focused on Palestine)

=== Peru ===
- Coordinadora Nacional de Derechos Humanos

=== Philippines ===
- Amnesty International Philippines
- Asian Federation Against Involuntary Disappearances
- Campaign for Human Rights in the Philippines
- Free Legal Assistance Group
- International Peace Observers Network
- Karapatan
- Nonviolent Peaceforce
- Philippine Alliance of Human Rights Advocates
- Philippine Human Rights Information Center
- Philippines–Canada Task Force on Human Rights
- Task Force Detainees of the Philippines

=== Poland ===
- Movement for Defense of Human and Civic Rights (20th century)

=== Russia ===
- Glasnost Defense Foundation
- Moscow Research Center for Human Rights
- SOVA Center
- Chechnya:
  - Chechnya Advocacy Network

=== Saudi Arabia ===
- ALQST
- Association for the Protection and Defense of Women's Rights in Saudi Arabia
- Center for Democracy and Human Rights in Saudi Arabia
- European Saudi Organisation for Human Rights
- Human Rights First Society
- Saudi Civil and Political Rights Association
- Society for Development and Change

=== South Korea ===
- Database Center for North Korean Human Rights

=== Sri Lanka ===
- Home for Human Rights
- NESOHR
- University Teachers for Human Rights

=== Sweden ===
- Swedish International Development Cooperation Agency

=== Syria ===
- al-Marsad

=== Taiwan ===
- Taiwan Association for Human Rights

=== Thailand ===
- Amnesty International Thailand
- Anjaree
- EMPOWER

=== Tunisia ===
- Tunisia Monitoring Group

=== Uganda ===
- Resolve Uganda

=== Ukraine ===
- Kharkiv Human Rights Protection Group
- Ukrainian Helsinki Human Rights Union

=== United Kingdom ===
- Liberty
- Peter Tatchell Foundation
- Northern Ireland:
  - Committee on the Administration of Justice

=== United States ===
- ACLU
- Alliance for Human Research Protection
- Avaaz
- Center for Constitutional Rights
- Center for Victims of Torture
- Ella Baker Center for Human Rights
- Empowering Spirits Foundation
- Hands Up United
- Human Rights Campaign
- Human Rights Commission of Salt Lake City
- Human Rights Initiative of North Texas
- Humanitarian Law Project
- International Justice Mission
- Jewish Voice for Peace
- Justice For All
- Meiklejohn Civil Liberties Institute
- National Youth Rights Association
- Lantos Foundation for Human Rights and Justice
- Lawyers' Committee for Civil Rights Under Law
- Society for Human Rights (Disbanded)
- Southern Poverty Law Center
- Workplace Fairness

=== Venezuela ===
- PROVEA (1988) Spanish acronym for the Venezuelan Education-Action Program on Human Rights
- Venezuelan Observatory of Social Conflict (2010)

=== Zimbabwe ===
- Zimbabwe Lawyers for Human Rights

== United Nations Bodies ==
- Office of the United Nations High Commissioner for Human Rights
- United Nations Security Council
- Sub-Commission on the Promotion and Protection of Human Rights
- United Nations Human Rights Council
- United Nations Commission on Human Rights (disbanded)
- International Criminal Court
- OSCE Representative on Freedom of the Media
- UNESCO
- United Nations Parliamentary Assembly

=== Human rights treaty bodies ===
- Human Rights Committee
- Committee on the Elimination of Racial Discrimination
- Committee on the Elimination of Discrimination against Women
- Committee Against Torture
- Committee on the Rights of the Child

== Other multilateral organisations ==
- African Commission on Human and Peoples' Rights
- African Court on Human and Peoples' Rights
- American Convention on Human Rights
- Arab Organization for Human Rights
- Commissioner for Human Rights
- Committee for the Prevention of Torture
- Commonwealth of Nations
- European Court of Human Rights
- OAS Special Rapporteur for Freedom of Expression
- Subcommittee on Human Rights
- Inter-American Commission on Human Rights
- Inter-American Court of Human Rights
- ASEAN Intergovernmental Commission on Human Rights

== See also ==
- List of human rights awards
- List of civil rights leaders
- List of indigenous rights organizations
- List of LGBT rights organizations
- List of women's organizations
- List of women's conferences
