= Rafiee =

Rafiee (Persian: رفیعی) may refer to:

- Allameh Sayyed Abul Hasan Rafiee Qazvini (1890–1975), Iranian Islamic philosopher, and jurist
- Hossein Rafiee (born 1945), Iranian scholar, pro-democracy activist, and an author
- Keyvan Rafiee, Iranian former prisoner of conscience
- Tarlan Rafiee (born 1980), Iranian visual artist and curator
