= Human rights in Iceland =

Human Rights Index of V-Dem Institute

Iceland is generally considered to be one of the leading countries in the world in regard to the human rights enjoyed by its citizens. Human rights are guaranteed by Sections VI and VII of Iceland's Constitution. Since 1989, a post of Ombudsman exists. Elections are free and fair, security forces report to civilian authorities, there is no state violence, and human rights groups are allowed to operate without restriction. Religious freedom is guaranteed, and discrimination based on sexual orientation is illegal.

The General Committee of the Icelandic Parliament, the Althingi, is responsible for the legislative oversight of human rights.

In a 2012 interview, a member of the UN Human Rights Committee singled out two principal human-rights problems in Iceland: “inequality between women and men...especially in the labour market” and the “sexual abuse of children.”

== Althing Ombudsman ==
Althing ombudsman is elected by parliament. Individuals can file complaints with the ombudsman about the actions of public officials, and the ombudsman may demand to see government reports and compel officials to give testimony. Although the ombudsman can only issue recommendations, not orders, the government generally acts upon those recommendations.

== Civil liberties ==
Iceland's constitution guarantees freedom of speech and of the press. Iceland has full Internet freedom, academic freedom, freedom of assembly and association, and freedom of religion. There is also full freedom of movement within the country, freedom to travel abroad, to move out of the country and move back. Iceland accepts refugees; forced exile is illegal. Iceland's 2008 banking crisis, however, affected certain freedoms, in the view of economists Jon Danielsson and Ragnar Arnason. They noted in a November 2011 article that “Icelandic firms seeking to invest abroad need rarely-granted permission from the Central Bank. Icelandic citizens need a government authorisation for foreign travel, since a Central Bank licence is needed to get tightly rationed foreign currency for travel. Any individual seeking to emigrate from Iceland is at least partially locked in by the capital controls by virtue of not being able to transfer his or her assets abroad, a restriction on emigration not commonly seen in democracies. This disregard of individuals’ civil rights as a result of the capital controls violates Iceland's legal commitments under the European four freedoms.”

== Rights of victims of rape and domestic abuse ==
While rape can be punished by up to 16 years in prison, the typical sentence is no more than three years. There have been complaints that in cases of rape the burden of proof is so heavy that it discourages the reporting and prosecution of such crimes. Although the punishment for domestic violence can also be up to 16 years in prison, with the law permitting judges “to increase the sentences of persons who commit violence against persons with whom they had a domestic relationship or other close bond,” there were no domestic violence cases in 2010 in which sentences were increased. Moreover, the number of women seeking medical help and counselling in the wake of domestic incidents significantly exceeds the number actually reporting such incidents, and some observers explain this by pointing to the infrequency of actual convictions and the lenient sentences for those convicted.

Icelandic law defines sexual harassment very broadly, essentially including any activity that is perceived as disrespectful. Those who consider themselves to have been harassed can report incidents to the Complaints Committee on Equal Status. While Icelandic courts have the power to issue restraining orders, critics have complained that such orders did not have the desired effect because they were granted too infrequently and took too long to be issued. Victims of sexual harassment have the right to be represented by lawyers, but most such victims choose not to take legal action.

== Family rights and gender equality ==
Icelanders have the right to determine for themselves how many children they will have; they enjoy free access to contraceptives as well as to prenatal, obstetric, and postpartum care. Women are equal to men under the law, but earn less on average. The Centre for Gender Equality (CGE) promotes gender equality and provides counselling and education on the subject to various public and private institutions. Violations of gender equality are adjudicated by the Complaints Committee on Equal Status, whose members are appointed by the minister of social affairs and social security, who also appoints members of the Equal Status Council, which makes recommendations for improving workplace equality.

A CGE pamphlet addressed to foreign women in Iceland explains to them what their rights are as residents of Iceland, and also contains information about Icelandic law regarding residency, marriage, divorce, custody, social benefits, and domestic abuse. In addition, it provides contact information for organizations that can help women in abusive situations. The pamphlet explains that men and women in Iceland are equal and that violence and threats against women are illegal. It also helpfully addresses a number of practical violations of human rights that foreign women may experience in their own lives.

The Icelandic Human Rights Centre (IHRC) noted that in 2006, up to 40% of women who seek refuge at the Women's Shelter in Reykjavik were immigrants. Previously, foreign women who left their spouses within three years after receiving residency permits lost their rights to residency, thus leading to cases in which women stayed in abusive marriages to avoid deportation. Although the Icelandic government professed to be aware of this problem and claimed that in practice it routinely renewed the residency permits of women in such situations, many such women were unaware of this practice. Two recent amendments to the Act on Foreign Nationals address these situations. One of the amendments denies residency permits to immigrant women on the basis of cohabitation with partners known to be abusive; the other amendment encourages women to leave such relationships by offering them the opportunity to apply for another type of residency permits. While the IHRC praises these amendments, it says that not enough has been done to protect and help immigrant women, in particular to help them learn Icelandic and become full members of society.

== Disabled persons' rights ==
While Icelandic law prohibits discrimination against disabled persons and requires that such persons “receive preference for government jobs,” disability rights advocates complain that these laws are not fully enforced and that disabled people represent a majority of Iceland's poor. Icelandic law ensures “access to buildings, information, and communications” to disabled persons; yet while violations are supposed to be punished by up to two years in prison, disability rights advocates complain that such punishments “rarely, if ever,” take place. The government body mainly responsible for disabled rights is the Ministry of Social Affairs and Social Security. The IHRC agrees that while the situation of disabled people in Iceland “has improved vastly” in recent years, “disabled persons in Iceland habitually suffer discrimination with respect to, for instance, the right to education, housing and participation in public life.”

== LGBT rights ==
During 2010, there were no reports of violence or discrimination in Iceland based on sexual orientation or on HIV/AIDS status. A 2011 report by the IHRC noted that largely as a result of the efforts of the National Organization of Lesbians and Gay Men (now the National Queer Organization), founded in 1978, gay people had spoken out more openly about their orientation and now enjoy widespread acceptance in Iceland. In recent years the NQO and IHRC have concentrated their efforts on transgender rights, and especially on the lack of legislation on transgender issues. The IHRC does note that it has recently been made easier for transgender people to change their names and gender officially. The IHRC further notes that “adoption rights and a legal right to clinical fertilization of lesbians were established in 2006 and a new and Universal Act of Marriage, applying equally to hetero-and homosexual couples was passed through Parliament on 11 June 2010.”

== Racial discrimination and immigrants' rights ==
Although Article 65 of the Icelandic Constitution establishes equality of all Icelanders and forbids racial discrimination, however long the Icelandic Constitution dates back to 1944, prior to the advent of the term "Racial Discrimination" by the International Convention on the Elimination of All Forms of Racial Discrimination and of the and although a number of Icelandic laws also underscore the constitutional guarantee of equality, the IHRC has complained that Icelandic law does not clearly define racial discrimination or provide sufficiently for combating discrimination. The IHRC has also criticized Iceland for its failure to sign or ratify the Convention on the Protection of the Rights of All Migrant Workers and Members of Their Families.

Some immigrants from Eastern Europe have been harassed in Iceland, and in September 2010 the Icelandic media focused on the case of a Cuban father and son who left the country briefly after a series of attacks on their home. In the wake of this episode, other immigrants came out in the media recounting their own experiences with racism.

== Employees' rights ==
Under Icelandic law, workers can form and join labour unions, which are independent of the government and of political parties. About 80 to 85 percent of persons employed in Iceland are members of unions, and 100 percent are covered by collective-bargaining agreements. Employees have the right to strike, although the government has instituted mandatory mediation in cases where strikes have endangered important economic sectors, such as fishing. In March 2010 the Icelandic parliament banned a strike by Icelandair's aircraft mechanics. While forced labour is illegal, there have been reports of women who have been trafficked to Iceland for sexual exploitation and of men being trafficked to the country to work in construction, manufacturing, and restaurants. Indications are that the men, most of them Eastern European, knowingly and willingly take illegal work in Iceland to earn more than they would earn at home.

The IHRC has noted that there are indeed “indications that Iceland is now a destination country for sex-trafficking,” and suggests that foreign women working in Icelandic strip clubs are examples of such trafficking. “There are stories of women arriving in the country to work in a strip club having their passports and return tickets taken from them and being forced to work off their debt before being able to leave the club,” reports the IHRC, which has noted that it, along with the Icelandic women's movement, had long been advocating for legislation that would provide for “victim and witness protection” to people involved in human trafficking. Although several bills that would have provided for such protection have been submitted to the Parliament, no such law has yet been passed.

It is against the law in Iceland to employ persons under 16 “in factories, on ships, or in other places that are hazardous or require hard labour,” although children of 14 or 15 “may work part time or during school vacations in light, nonhazardous jobs.” The Administration of Occupational Safety and Health (AOSH) enforces these regulations.

Iceland has no official minimum wage. Instead, minimum wages for specific occupations are negotiated in collective bargaining agreements which may be “industry-wide, sector-wide, or in some cases firm-specific.” The official workweek is 40 hours, including nearly three hours of breaks. Anyone working over eight hours a day must be paid overtime.

== Prisoners' and detainees' rights ==
Prison conditions in Iceland are generally up to international standards. There is a separate minimum-security prison for women, but because the number of female prisoners in Iceland is generally so low (at any given time, the average number is four), some male inmates are also housed there, although in different cellblocks. Juvenile offenders are generally held in facilities supervised by the Government Agency for Child Protection. Moreover, at times when the main prison at Litla-Hraun or Reykjavik's pretrial detention facility is overcrowded, pretrial detainees are held at local police precincts. In 2010, owing to prison overcrowding, 276 individuals who had been convicted of crimes were on a waiting list to serve their sentences.

Arbitrary arrest and detention are prohibited in Iceland. When individuals are sentenced to serve less than six months, the Prison and Probation Administration (PPA) has the power to sentence them to community service rather than prison. Prisoners can receive visitors and can complain about prison conditions to the judiciary and to a parliamentary ombudsman. In 2010, there was not a single allegation of inhumane prison conditions.

Iceland has been criticized for decades by human rights organizations over its extensive use of solitary confinement, with 61% of pre-trial detainees in 2021 being held in solitary confinement, including children and people with mental disabilities. This includes a 1994 report by the Council of Europe's Committee for the Prevention of Torture, and a 2023 report by Amnesty International.

== Police powers and arrest procedures ==
The Icelandic police, who are under civilian authority, “may make arrests under a number of circumstances: when they believe a prosecutable offense has been committed, when they see a need to prevent further offenses or destruction of evidence, when they need to protect a suspect, or when a person refuses to obey police orders to move. Arrest warrants usually are not employed; the criminal code explicitly requires warrants only for arresting individuals who fail to appear at court for a hearing or a trial or at a prison to serve a sentence.” Under Icelandic law, individuals who have been arrested must be told at once what they are being charged with, informed of their rights, and brought before a judge within 24 hours of arrest. They have a right to legal counsel, and those who cannot afford to pay for counsel are entitled to an attorney of their choice, paid for by the government, although if found guilty they are obliged to repay the government for the cost of their defence.

== Court system and trial procedures ==
The Icelandic judiciary is independent. It is up to the individual judge to decide whether to keep a suspect in custody during a crime investigation or to grant release pending trial. There is no bail system.

The Icelandic constitution guarantees a fair trial. Although trials are usually open to the public, they may be held behind closed doors at the request of the defendant or in cases involving minors. There are no juries, but instead judges or multijudge panels. Defendants have the right to attend their trial, to confront witnesses, and to present evidence. In some cases, prosecutors may introduce evidence that has been obtained illegally. Defendants may appeal verdicts to the Supreme Court.

There is no distinction in Iceland between criminal and civil courts. The judiciary is on two levels, the district courts and the Supreme Court.

House searches without a prior court order are permitted by immigration law in some cases involving possible immigration fraud.

== Human-rights organizations ==
=== Institute of Human Rights ===
The Institute of Human Rights describes itself as “an independent institution, founded by the University of Iceland, the Icelandic Law Society and the Icelandic Judge's Society, 14th April 1994.” Headquartered in Lögberg on Suðurgata, it produces “research relating to the legal aspects of human rights, see to mediating research results and support teaching in this field. To this end the institute's board shall, for instance, initiate seminars about human rights issues and support students, lecturers, lawyers, judges and others in studies, and initiate information meetings regarding human rights issues.”

=== Icelandic Human Rights Centre ===
The Icelandic Human Rights Centre (IHRC) describes its aim as being “to promote human rights by collecting information on and raising awareness of human rights issues in Iceland and abroad. The Centre works to make human rights information accessible to the public by organising conferences and seminars on human rights issues and by providing human rights education.” It “also promotes legal reform and research on human rights and has established the only specialised human rights library in Iceland.” Furthermore, it “serves a monitoring role and has, since its inception, commented on dozens of bills of law and public policy and provided information to international monitoring bodies on the state of human rights in Iceland.” The IHRC notes that it “has assumed the functions of a national human rights institution as set out in the UN Paris principles, though its powers, independence and financing are not established by statute.”

== Participation in basic human rights treaties ==
United Nations core treaties	Participation of Iceland	Council of Europe core treaties	Participation of Iceland
Convention on the Elimination of All Forms of Racial Discrimination	Ratified in 1967	European Convention on Human Rights	Ratified in 1953
International Covenant on Civil and Political Rights	Ratified in 1979	Protocol 1 (ECHR)	Ratified in 1953
First Optional Protocol (ICCPR)	Accession in 1979	Protocol 4 (ECHR)	Ratified in 1967
Second Optional Protocol (ICCPR)	Ratification in 1991	Protocol 6 (ECHR)	Ratified in 1987
International Covenant on Economic, Social and Cultural Rights	Ratified in 1979	Protocol 7 (ECHR)	Ratified in 1987
Convention on the Elimination of All Forms of Discrimination Against Women	Ratified in 1985	Protocol 12 (ECHR)	Signed in 2000
Optional Protocol (CEDAW)	Ratified in 2001	Protocol 13 (ECHR)	Ratified in 2004
United Nations Convention Against Torture	Ratified in 1996	European Social Charter	Ratified in 1976
Optional Protocol (CAT)	Signed in 2003	Additional Protocol of 1988 (ESC)	Signed in 1988
Convention on the Rights of the Child	Ratified in 1992	Additional Protocol of 1995 (ESC)	Not signed
Optional Protocol on the Involvement of Children in Armed Conflict (CRC)	Ratified in 2001	Revised European Social Charter	Signed in 1998
Optional Protocol on the sale of children, child prostitution and child pornography (CRC)	Ratified in 2001	European Convention for the Prevention of Torture and Inhuman or Degrading Treatment or Punishment	Ratified in 1990
Convention on the Protection of the Rights of All Migrant Workers and Members of Their Families	Not signed	European Charter for Regional or Minority Languages	Signed in 1999
Convention on the Rights of Persons with Disabilities	Signed in 2007	Framework Convention for the Protection of National Minorities	Signed in 1995
Optional Protocol (CRPD)	Signed in 2007	Convention on Action against Trafficking in Human Beings	Signed in 2005

== See also ==
- Internet in Iceland
