= Leila Hosseinzadeh =

Iranian student activist, human rights activist and political prisoner

- لیلا حسین‌زاده
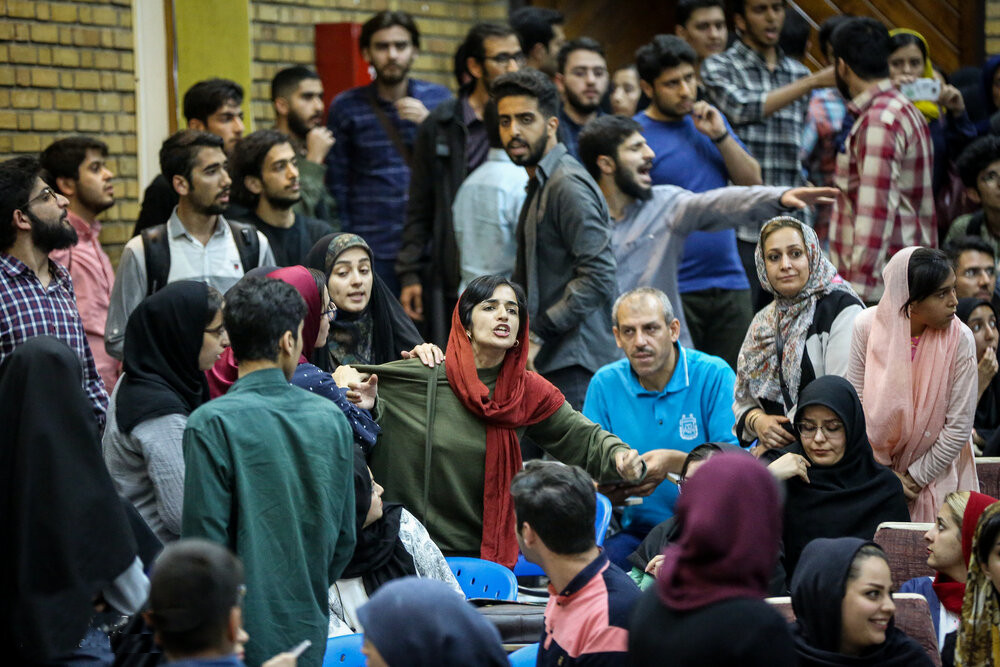
- Born: 1991 (age 34–35)
- Occupation: Student activist

Leila Hosseinzadeh (Persian: لیلا حسین‌زاده; born 1991) is an Iranian student activist and a political prisoner.

== 2018 arrest ==
Hosseinzadeh, at the time a student of the Faculty of Social Sciences and secretary of the Student Union Council of the University of Tehran, was arrested outside her house on 1 January 2018 for taking part in the December 2017 protests at the university. She was released on bail after 16 days. On March 7, 2018, she was sentenced by Branch 26 of Tehran's Revolutionary Court, presided over by Judge Mashallah Ahmadzadeh to five years in prison on the charge of “propaganda against the regime", together with one year in prison and a two-year ban on leaving the country on the charge of “propaganda against the regime”.

== 2019 trial and imprisonment ==
On June 24, 2019, the 36th Branch of the Revision Court of Tehran Province commuted the sentence to 3 years and six months in prison and a two-year travel ban. Security forces arrested Leila Hosseinzadeh at her home on July 28, 2019, and detained her in an IRGC Intelligence facility for ten days. Subsequently, they took her to the women's ward of Evin Prison to serve her 2.5-year sentence.

== 2020 imprisonment and health condition ==
On March 11, 2020, Hosseinzadeh was released on furlough and on May 19, 2020, due to her health condition (autoimmune disease) and the implementation of the new year's compassionate release she was released again. On June 21, 2020, a new case was brought up and she was released on bail after attending the prosecutor's office. She was charged with "disrupting prison order by chanting slogans."

== 2021 trial and imprisonment ==
Hosseinzadeh was sentenced on February 27, 2021, by Branch 28 of Tehran's Revolutionary Court, headed by Mohammad-Reza Amouzad, to a five-year prison term on charges of “assembly and collusion with the intent to disrupt the country’s security”, and to two years of constraints on her activities in social media as an additional punishment; this ruling was approved after the case was appealed and referred to Branch 36 of the Tehran's Appeals Court; she was arrested once again on December 7, 2021, following a raid by Intelligence Department agents in Shiraz and transferred to solitary confinement in Ward 209 of Evin Prison for interrogation. On December 23, 2021, she was released on bail of 1.5 billion Tomans after getting transferred to the women's ward at Adelabad Prison located in Shiraz.

== 2022 arrest and imprisonment ==
On January 8, 2022, Hosseinzadeh was summoned to the Evin Courthouse to serve her sentence. On August 20, 2022, she was arrested and transferred to the Intelligence Department's Security Ward 209 located in Evin Prison. Thereafter, she was transferred for interrogation to Shiraz Intelligence Detention Center No. 100. On September 6, 2022, after being arrested for a while, she was transferred to Adelabad Prison in Shiraz. According to her brother, Abolfazl Hosseinzadeh, Leila's disease causes eye issues and Hosseinzadeh has been suffering from blurred vision for about two weeks. On November 1, the prison infirmary's physician asked for dispatching her for treatment, which was not accepted.

== See also ==
- Human rights in Iran
- Human Rights Activists in Iran
- Women's rights in Iran
- Islamic Revolutionary Court
