= Death of Angira Pasi =

2020 death in Devdaha, Nepal

- "Selfie" taken by Pasi.
- Date: May 23, 2020
- Location: Devdaha, Rupandehi District, Nepal
- Cause: Hanging of Angira Pasi
- Deaths: 1
- Arrests: 3

On 23 May 2020, the dead body of 13-year-old girl Angira Pasi was found hanging from a tree in Devdaha, Nepal. The day before that, she was reportedly raped by 25-year-old Birendra Bhar, after which the local residents and ward member Amar Bahadur Chaudhary held a discussion and decided that Pasi was to be married to Bhar. After her death, the police initially refused to register the case; police only registered it after public outrage.

== The incident ==
On 22 May 2020, 13-year-old Dalit girl Angira Pasi was reportedly raped by 25-year-old Birendra Bhar. Pasi's mother learned of the incident, and local residents and ward member Amar Bahadur Chaudhary held a discussion in which it was decided that Pasi was to be married to Bhar. Chaudhary later stated that he told the local residents that the marriage would be illegal, while the community members told the media that it was his idea that the two should marry. Bhar's mother refused to let Pasi enter her home and reportedly beat her. On 23 May 2020, Bhar took Pasi to a stream, where her dead body was found hanging from a tree in Devdaha, Rupandehi District, with "her shoes off her feet, her clothes torn, her hair dishevelled".

The local residents believe that Pasi was murdered by Birendra Bhar's family. One resident noted that the tree was too tall for her to climb and hang herself, and "circumstantial evidence suggested other foul play". According to journalist Binod Pariyar, Bhar's family offered 200,000 Nepalese rupees to suppress the case and prevent the involvement of police or human rights organisations. Pasi's family claimed that Bhar's family "beat her to death and framed the girl's suicide".

== Reaction ==
Human Rights Watch called the Government of Nepal to investigate the case; they said "the government should ensure prompt and rigorous investigations by the police, free from political interference". Human rights watch group Nepal Monitor had recorded almost two dozen cases of caste-based violence and discrimination post-COVID-19 pandemic lock-down in Nepal. Angira Pasi's mother filed a complaint against Bhar's family. Initially, the Area Police Office refused to register the complaint on her behalf, claiming that it was a suicide. Bhar's family was only arrested after public outrage. According to NGO INSEC, there have been more than 187 rapes and 75 sexual abuses against girls in the first three months of Nepal's lockdown. In June 2020, Rupandehi District Court remanded Birendra Bhar, Akali Devi, and Bhar's aunt Shitali.

== See also ==
- Soti incident, which happened the same day
- Rape and murder of Nirmala Panta
