= Kitty Anderson =

Kitty Anderson may refer to:

- Kitty Anderson (activist), Icelandic intersex activist
- Dame Katherine Anderson, known as Kitty Anderson (1903–1979), English headmistress
