= Hope Behind Bars Africa =

Human rights organisation

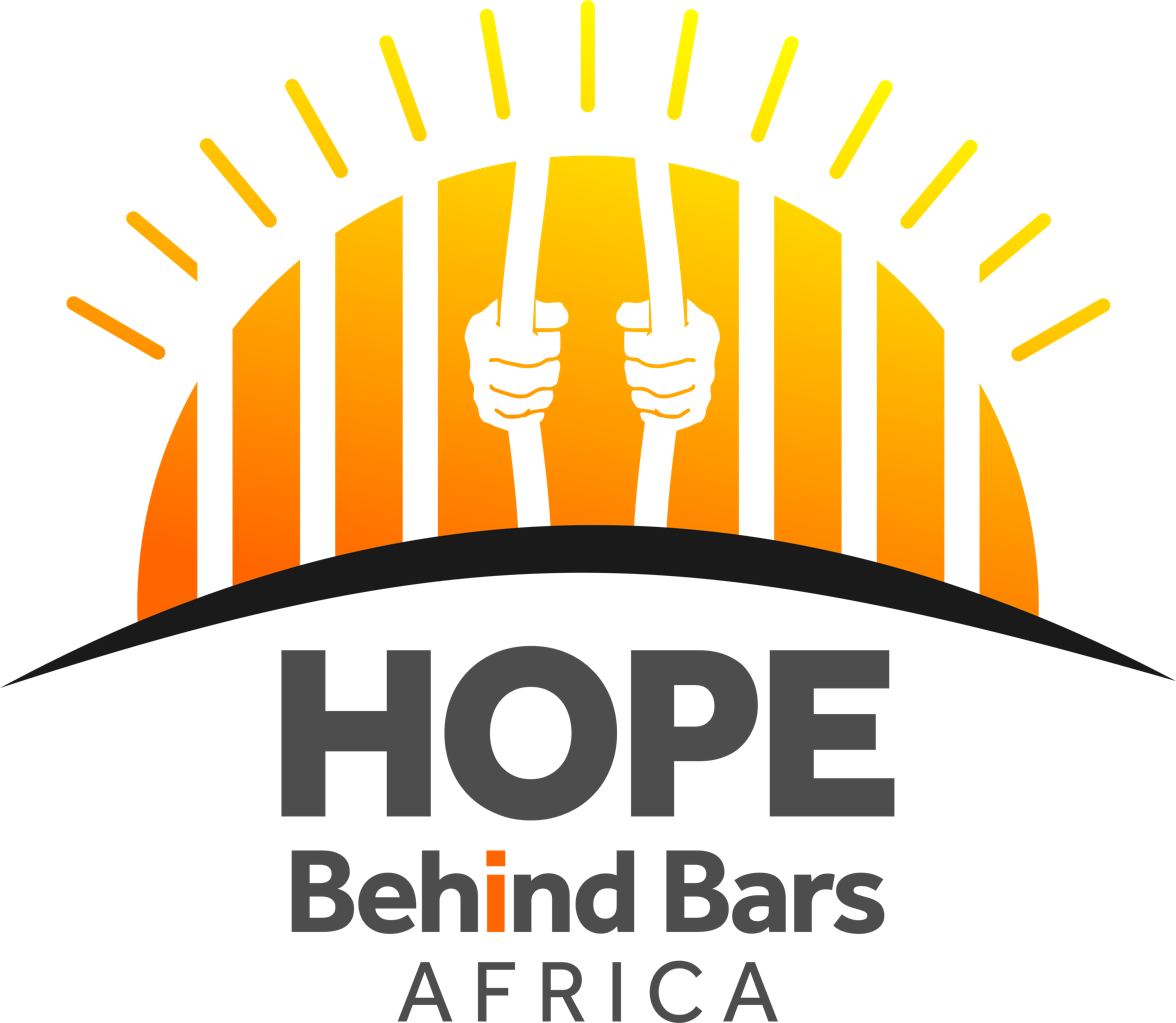

Hope Behind Bars Africa (HBBA) is a Nigeria-based human rights organisation closing the justice and inequality gap through the use of legal aid, technology, support for incarcerated individuals and evidence-based advocacy. The organization, uses a social enterprise model in providing access to justice to indigent pre-trial detainees; with 7,500 justice-involved individuals having benefited from its interventions.

== History ==
Hope Behind Bars Africa was founded in 2018 by Nigerian lawyer Funke Adeoye who had a personal experience with the criminal justice system as a child when her father was unfairly treated by the system.

In 2018, Hope Behind Bars Africa provided pro-bono legal services to indigent pre-trial detainees in Nigeria. It has represented 427 pre-trial detainees; also representing and releasing 90 pre-trial detainees linked to the #EndSARS movement.

In 2019, the organisation had become a beneficiary of the Accountability Lab Incubation Program, the Accountability Incubator; with Oluwafunke also winning the SDG 16 Innovation Challenge for her web-based application “Connect Lawyer”. The app serves as an intersection between lawyers interested in offering pro-bono legal services and indigent pre-trial detainees requiring their services.

In 2023, HBBA partnered with Legend Golden Care Foundation to create the Accelerating Justice Reforms in Nigeria (AJURN) Project. AJURN is directed at the speedy dispensation of justice for detainees, and activation of the Non-Custodial Unit of the Correctional Service in Nigeria.

The organization, has directly supported the empowerment of incarcerated persons either within the correctional centres or as they re-enter the society.

HBBA has assisted over 50 offenders with a chance at quality education, through donations of educational materials, internet facilities, and payment of enrolment fees. The organization is partnered with Campaign to Decriminalise Poverty & Status, Catalyst 2030, NAMATI, and World Coalition Against the Death Penalty. They were granted UN ECOSOC status in June 2023.

HBBA won 2022 UNLEASH Plus Dragons’ Den and 2023 Waislitz Global Citizen Awards.

== See also ==
- Legal aid – General concept related to HBBA's work
- Prison reform – Broader topic connected to HBBA's mission
- Omowumi Ogunrotimi – Nigerian lawyer and gender rights advocate
- Chidi Odinkalu – Nigerian human rights lawyer
