= Association Najdeh =

Non-governmental organization

- Founded: Founded in 1976, Registered in 1978
- Location(s): Lebanon; General quarter in Beirut
- Region served: Protecting human rights, development, education
- Fields: Nonviolence, research, lobbying
- Members: 252
- Key people: Leila El Ali
- Website: association-najdeh.org/index.html

Association Najdeh (AN) (جمعية النجدة الاجتماعية in Arabic, Arabic najdeh="relief" or "aid") is a NGO involved with development and educational projects in Palestinian refugee camps in Lebanon. It operates more exactly in and around the refugee camps. It defends the Palestinian refugee women who are often victims of discriminations and also participates in different campaigns, in coalitions of local and international organizations, for the right to work in Lebanon and the right of return to Palestine.

== History ==
The association Najdeh was founded in 1976 by a group of independent Lebanese women and men to secure immediate income to Palestinian refugee women in particular after the movement of Palestinian family to the camp of Tel-Za'atar. An initial work of embroidery was organized and generated an income, then a day-care center and a workplace for the women was created. Finally, in 1978, the Najdeh association was registered to the Ministry of the Interior as the independent Lebanese social and non-governmental organization (NGO) with headquarters in Beirut. Between 2005 in 2006, the association Najdeh elaborated a Code of conduct, intended to strengthen the role of the civil society institutions. It opposes to the proposition in 2006, of an Islamic constitution in Burj el-Barajneh camp, by institutions with Islamic trend. It has been recently mobilized during the conflict in Nahr el-Bared camps of May, 2007 to bring relief and assistance to residents of the camp. The association Najdeh organized demonstrations in all the regions of the Lebanon, on April 30, 2009, for "the right to work campaign of the Palestinian refugees in the Lebanon", in particular with Palestinian-Lebanese coalition's commissions, after having published a report on the contribution of the Palestinian refugees to the Lebanese economy, in January, 2009, thanks to funding from aid agencies (Diakonia and Christian Aid).

== Objectives ==
The main purpose of the association Najdeh is to empower women in the Palestinian community because they are a most severely disadvantage component of the Palestinian refugee community. The improvement of the role of the women in the Palestinian community also concerns their economic, social and educational role.

== Profile ==
The association Najdeh organs consists of: a General assembly, an Administrative Bureau elected by this Assembly, members of the Executive Board assigned by this Administrative Bureau. The General assembly is 70% of women and 30% of men. The administrative board has progressed over the last few years from only female members to a fifty-fifty female/male division (6 members). The staff is primarily women and members of the Palestinian refugee community. Eighty percent of the beneficiaries are women and Palestinians, while the remaining 20% are men and individuals of other nationalities. The association Najdeh operates on 26 centers in and around refugee camps. Its programs focus directly on the women and include: vocational training Program, Popular Education and Tutorial Program, Mother and Child Program, Social Affairs, Domestic Violence Program, microcredit Project, and Embroidery. It also defends the rights of the Palestinians by activities of raising awareness on subjects such as the health of the reproduction, the rights of the woman and the rights of the child. The programs of the association would touch up to 10 000 refugees, in all palestinian refugee camps, including camps Burj el-Barajneh, Nahr el-Bared, Shatila, Beddawi, etc.

== Core values ==
The association Najdeh has personal core values that it intend to promote: a community committed to the Palestinian nation, a belief in the importance of human rights, of social justice and of gender equality. As a member of the Humanitarian Accountability Partnership International(HAP International) since August 2009, she believes in the values of PAHs based on transparency and accountability.

== Funding ==
The association Najdeh has several sources of funding. The donations are a big part, their origins are multiple: mainly funds from donor organizations and individuals from Europe, and from some partners present in United States and Canada. The other sources of income are: incomes from the production of embroidery, fees for students in professional training program and those for program of women and children.

== See also ==
- Humanitarian Accountability Partnership International
- List of human rights organisations
