= Philippine Human Rights Information Center =

The Philippine Human Rights Information Center (PhilRights) is a non-profit, national human rights organization in the Philippines, Manila. PhilRights is the research and information arm of the Philippine Alliance of Human Rights Advocates (PAHRA) and is a research and information institution that provides information, documentation, research and analyses. The main work are the Institutional Programs: Human Rights Research, Human Rights Monitoring and Documentation, Human Rights Information, Human Rights Education and Training.

PhilRights was founded in 1991 by PAHRA.
