= Bosfam =

Non-governmental organisation to assist women affected by the Bosnian War

- Founded: May 1995 by women participants in the EU funded Oxfam GB women's workshops programme - the development of 'Bosfam' (a name chosen by the women founders of the NGO) was supported by Oxfam through the deployment of national staff member Munira Beba Hadzic
- Type: Non-profit; NGO
- Location(s): Tuzla, Bosnia and Herzegovina
- Fields: psychosocial counseling, income generation through handcrafts, human rights advocacy
- Website: www.bosfam.ba

Bosfam (The Association Bosnian Family; Bosnian: Udruženje Bosanska Familija) is a non-governmental organization that provides psychosocial and economic assistance to women affected by the Bosnian war of 1992-1995. It was founded in May 1995 by women participating in an Oxfam GB psycho-social 'radionice' project to support internally displaced Bosnian women. In May 1995 Oxfam deployed one of its national staff members, Munira Beba Hadzic, to coordinate and support the establishment of a local NGO out of the successful EU funded women's support project. Oxfam also supported Ms Hadzic to travel to the UN Beijing women's conference in 1995.

== Mission ==
Bosfam was established in Tuzla, Bosnia and Herzegovina as a project to support displaced Bosnian women regardless of their age, religion, ethnic background, or education. Bosfam’s mission is to help war-affected Bosnian women and their families gain psychosocial and economic stability as they struggle against trauma, poverty, and misery. Bosfam operates on the principles of humaneness, impartiality, independence, and voluntarism.

== History ==
The Bosnian war of 1992-1995 was characterized by ethnic cleansing and forced displacement. Thousands of Bosniak-Muslims expelled from their homes in Srebrenica and the surrounding areas arrived at crowded collective centers in the town of Tuzla.

In 1993-4 the international relief and development agency Oxfam GB had, among other projects (including support to disabled people and their organisations, psycho social interventions and relief distributions), started a knitting corners project in collective centres to provide displaced women with occupation and an opportunity to gather together in solidarity and support of each other. This was developed into a 'radionice' or 'workshops' project with activities such as weaving and knitting offered in an alternative space, along with the opportunity to meet and chat and share experiences, and to participate in facilitated group counselling sessions. The project recognised that at the same time as assimilating the trauma of their recent experiences displaced women needed opportunities for economic activity to support their families.

Oxfam remained in Bosnia and Herzegovina as the war escalated, throughout the entire remaining period of the conflict, and well beyond and continued to support the development of Bosfam throughout this period. In 1995 Oxfam allocated one of its national staff, Project Coordinator Munira Hadzić, who was herself an internally displaced woman (from Srebrenica), to support the development of the workshops project into a local NGO.

The women participating in the workshops project came together and established a local organisation and chose the name 'Bosfam', whose name derives from Bosnian family. The purpose was to support all women displaced within Bosnia who needed help.

Munira Hadzic remained in post as Coordinator of Bosfam once Oxfam GB left Bosnia a number of years after the conclusion of the conflict. Today, the majority of the members of Bosfam are women who lost their male relatives in the Srebrenica massacre of July 1995, in which more than 8,000 Muslim men and boys were killed by the Bosnian Serb soldiers commanded by General Ratko Mladić.

The goals and activities of Bosfam continue to include providing psychosocial support for Bosnian women traumatized by the war and loss of loved ones and helping them with opportunities for income generation. They have been expanded to include assisting displaced women to return to their homes in Srebrenica, and supporting efforts to bring justice to the victims of the Srebrenica massacre.

== Projects ==
=== Handcrafts ===
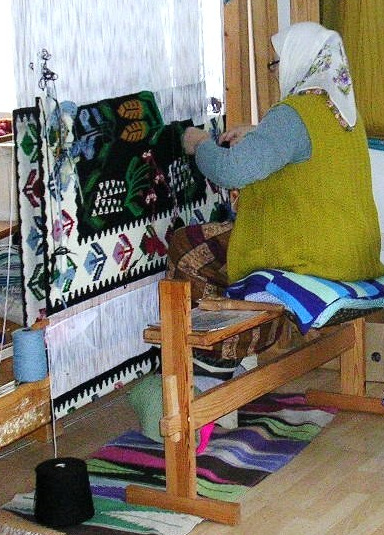
Bosfam weaver

Over 60 Bosfam women weave traditional Bosnian carpets, knit sweaters and scarves, and crochet clothing and house décor items. These products are sold online as well as in the Bosfam bazaar in Tuzla. In addition to providing a source of income for the women, skilled handcrafts play an important role in healing the mind and body, relaxing, and re-centering. Simply gathering on a daily basis to weave and knit provides the war-affected women a significant emotional and psychological support and makes their lives more bearable.

=== Srebrenica Memorial Quilt ===
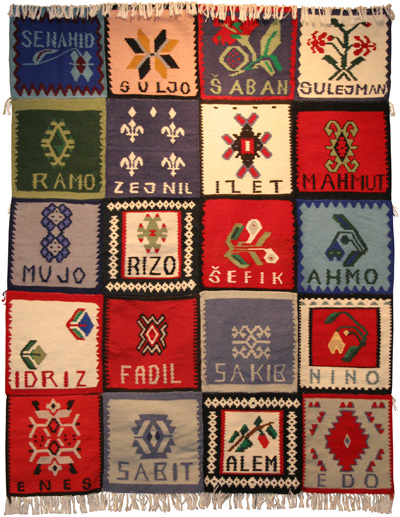
Srebrenica Memorial Quilt

In 2007, Bosfam launched the Srebrenica Memorial Quilt project. Under this project, the women of Bosfam weave large quilts made up of individual panels, each of which commemorates a person killed or went missing during the Srebrenica massacre of July 1995. The quilts contain the victims’ names, whereas Bosfam’s website provides these individuals’ photos, brief biographical information, and the date and site of burial if the body has been identified and buried. The reason behind this focus on individuals is to bring identity to the victims and to counteract the phenomenon of reducing massacre victims to mere numbers. Bosfam has woven 15 memorial quilts commemorating nearly 300 victims before the 15th anniversary of the Srebrenica massacre on 11 July 2010. BOSFAM considers the quilt to be “owned” by all Bosnians who were affected by the Srebrenica massacre.

The goal of the memorial quilts is not just to honor the dead and missing, but also to serve as an active instrument for social change – to keep the memory of the massacre alive, demand accountability for the atrocities in Srebrenica, and contribute to efforts of rebuilding Srebrenica and supporting the returnees. The quilts have been displayed at dozens of exhibitions and events in Europe and North America with the help of Bosfam’s Washington-based partner The Advocacy Project to raise awareness of the tragedy in Srebrenica and to act as a tool for human rights advocacy. Most importantly, one of the quilts was used at the International Criminal Tribunal for the former Yugoslavia based in The Hague to lobby at the trial of Radovan Karadžić, former president of the Bosnian Serbs.

=== Love in Embroidery ===
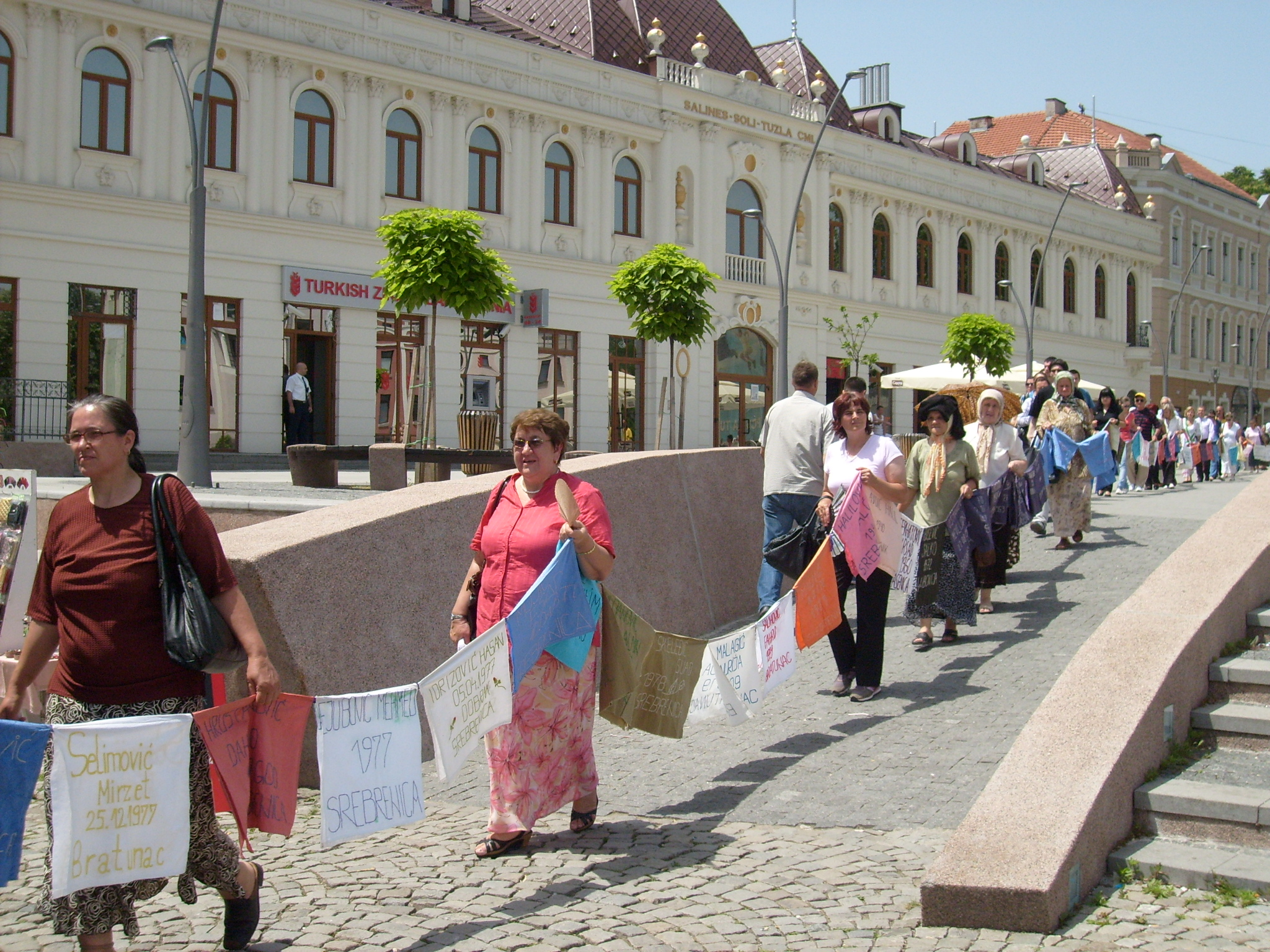
Peaceful protest in Tuzla using cushions made by Bosfam

In 1996, Bosfam started the project Love in Embroidery to make an embroidered cushion for each missing person containing his name, date of birth, and hometown. The women of Bosfam have so far made thousands of cushions, which are used at a peaceful protest on the 11th of each month – symbolizing the fall of Srebrenica which took place on 11 July 1995 – in order to show the immensity of the tragedy of Srebrenica and demand accountability for the mass crimes. The monthly peaceful protest takes place in the center of Tuzla and involves more than 100 people consisting of the victims’ relatives, NGO representatives, and other members of the community.

=== Counseling Center in Srebrenica ===
Bosfam is currently working to open a counseling center in Srebrenica. This new Bosfam center will give legal advice to returnees and provide various workshops for women. Beba Hadžić, now the Director of Bosfam, says that the women survivors of the Srebrenica massacre are often misperceived as passive victims who simply sit and wait for foreign aid. The mission of this new centre is to challenge this misperception, raise the voice of educated and motivated women, and show that the survivors of Srebrenica are not merely passive victims but can be active proponents of social change.
