= Dipendra Jha =

Nepal politician

Chief Attorney General of the Madhesh Province
- In office 18 February 2018 – 3 September 2022
- Appointed by: Ratneshwar Lal Kayastha

Personal details
- Born: Dipendra Jha; July 30, 1979 (age 46) Mahottari, Madhesh Province Nepal
- Party: No party- An Independent Lawyer.
- Spouse: Anu Jha (m. 2004)
- Children: 2 (Diya Jha and Aradhya Jha)
- Education: Harvard Law School-Leadership in Law Firm (LLF-2026) Mahidol University (Master of Arts - Human Rights), Bradford University (Master's Degree Arts-Peace and Conflict Studies), Tribhuvan University (LLB, LLM)

Dipendra Jha (Nepali: दिपेन्द्र झा) is the first Chief attorney of Madhesh Province, one of seven provinces of Nepal. He assumed the office in February 2018 and he completed his full five years term. He was the legal adviser to the Chief Minister Lalbabu Raut and the Convener of Bill Drafting Facilitation Committee in Madhesh Province. Article 160 (5) of the Constitution stipulates: "The Chief Attorney shall be the chief legal advisor to the State Government. It shall be the duty of the Chief Attorney to give opinions and advices on constitutional and legal matters to the State Government and such other authorities as the State Government may specify." He was also given responsibility by the cabinet as a Convener of Law drafting Committee of the Madhesh Government.

== Education ==
He has obtained a Masters of Arts (Human Rights) degree from Mahidol University in Thailand and a master's degree in Peace and Conflict studies from Bradford University in the U.K., as well as a Bachelor of Arts (Political Science and English Literature), L.L.B. and L.L.M. from the Tribhuvan University in Nepal. He was awarded with International Visitors Leadership Program (IVLP) by the United States of America in 2014. in 2023, he did Diploma in Federalism from University of Fribourg, Switzerland, Law department, http://www.federalism.ch/. In 2026, he did Leadership in Law Firm (LLF) course in 2026 from Harvard Law School @https://hls.harvard.edu/

Short Courses & Conference:

S.N		Courses & Conferences	Country	Remarks
1.	2024	Third Global Conference of Lawyers from October 8 to 12.	Casablanca, Morocco.	Labour Law
2.	2023	Diploma in Federalsim from University of Fribourg.	Switzerland, France, Germany & Italy	Federalism course
3.	2019	Attended Dayton Kettering Seminar (four days) on Participatory Democracy	Ohio, USA.	A short course-July
4.	2019	Attended Human Rights Conference of Carter Center.	Georgia, Atlanta, USA,	Human Rights-October.
5.	2019	Visited London to attend Peacebuilding Conference in October.	UK	Peace-building October
6.	2019	Visited USA, Chicago, Iowa, Philadelphia, Delaware and DC	USA	ANTA
7.	2018	Attended Dayton Kettering Seminar (four days) on Participatory Democracy	Dayton, Ohio, USA.	Second Year course
8.	2017	Visit to London & Edinburg Constitutional Conference	Ireland	Melbourne Law School
9.	2017	Visit to Ireland for a week to Dublin Conference	Ireland	Human Rights
10.	2017	Visit to Colombo March 24 to 26 Asian conference-Lawyers Beyond	Sri Lanka	Lawyers Conference
11.	2017	March 26 to April 1- to attend Nepal's dialogue Forum Conference	Berlin, Germany,	Lobby with Parliament
12.	2017	April 1 to 6 to London having various meetings with lawyers, FCO and Parliament	UK	Early Day motion -EDM
13.	2016	Visit to Beirut conference-Lawyers Beyond Border- Migrants workers	Lebnon	LBB
14.	2016	Visits of Hong Kong for conference several times on Rule of law and criminal justice	Hong Kong	AHRC conference
15.	2016	Visit to the Netherlands and Switzerland to make a presentation on Nepal human rights	Switzerland	Human Rights Course
16.	2015	Visit to Kuala Lumpur conference-Lawyers Beyond Border- Migrants workers	Malaysia	LBB
17.	2012	ELLA Award in 2012 in Mexico for a Two-Week South-South Exchange Program	Mexico	Visit to various places
18.	2011	Expert and trainer for GHR (Geneva for Human Rights)	Switzerland	Human Rights Course
19.	2010	10th International Human Rights Colloquium course, Brazil, Sao, Paulo	Brazil	Law Course
20.	2005	Human Rights, Monitoring, Investigation & Promotion organized by CDNHRC (UNDP 18 April-5 May)	Thailand	Human Rights course
21.	2005	Teachers Training on Human Rights and Humanitarian Law organized by ICRC Bangkok 1–4 October	Thailand	ICRC

== Career ==
=== First Chief Attorney General ===
He was the first Chief Attorney of the Madhes Province. While he was the Chief Attorney General, the provincial government had filed six writ petition against the federal government.It was on August 1, 2019 that the Province 2 [presently Madhesh] government filed the first writ petition against the federal government. It had challenged the decision of the Ministry of Forest to merge the Sagarnath Forestry Development Project with Timber Corporation of Nepal. The constitutional bench had issued an interim order in the Provincial government's favour. He was also given responsibility of Chairing the law drafting committee of the Madhes government, in his convenership, 58 law drafting took place such as the Madhesh Police Act, Madhesh Civil Service Act, Madhesh Policy Commission Act, Madhesh Dalit Empowerment Act, Madhesh Janlokpal Act, Madhesh Special Act for the Girls Protection-Educate Girls Protect Girls. Among seven provinces, Madhesh province made the first state police Act and Civil service act in his convenership which at that time created huge controversy. 50% reservation for women in civil service, police service and all government services are the few revolutionary law which was drafted under his convernership.

=== Lawyer ===
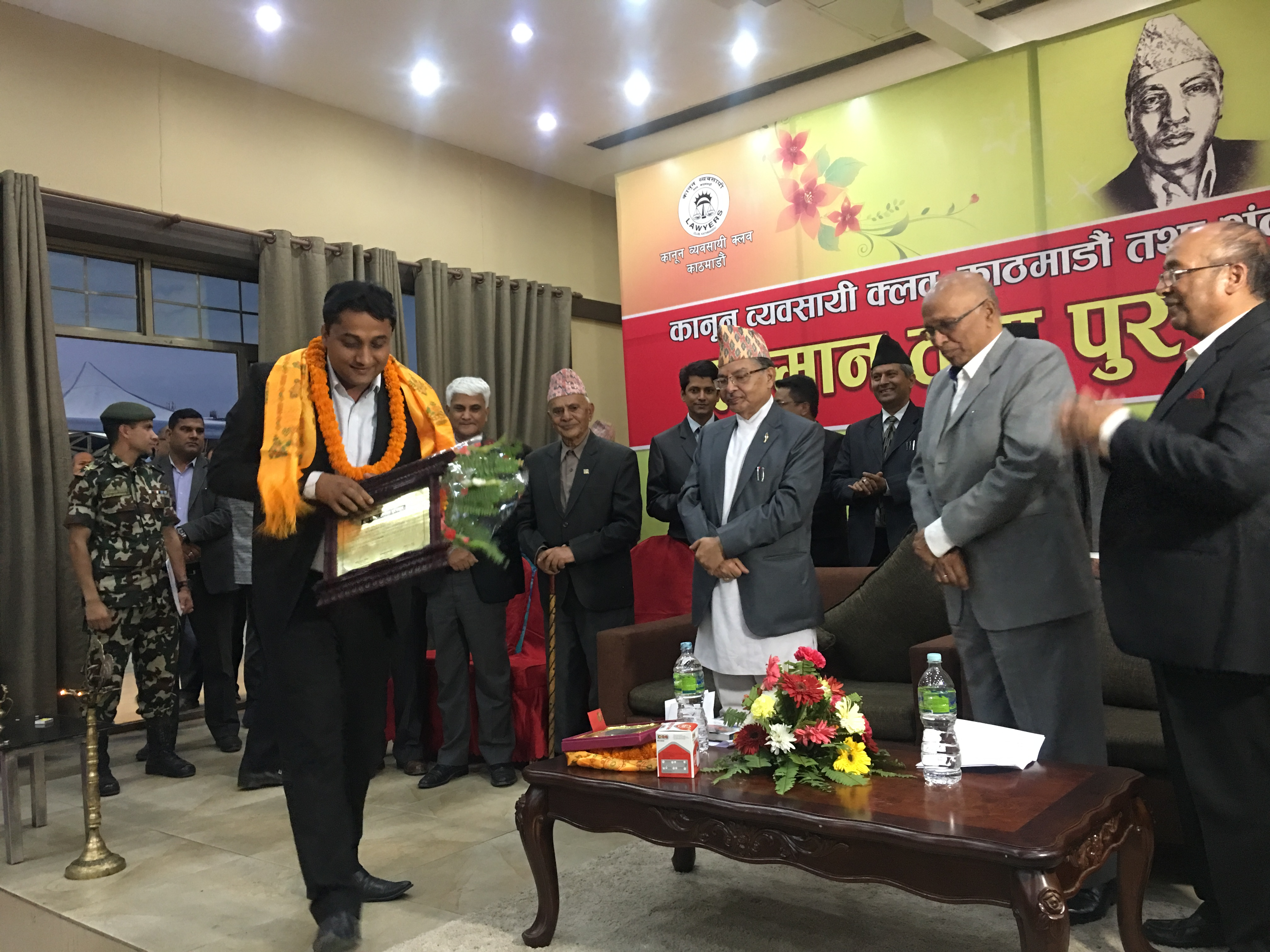
Award Receiving Ceremony.

Before he became Chief Attorney on 18 February 2018, he practiced law at the Supreme Court of Nepal. He was involved in a number of public interest litigation (PIL) cases on various key issues such as citizenship, inclusion, federalism and constitutional issues in Nepal. More than hundred cases of citizenship he fought at Supreme Court including on inclusion and social justice. He got the best youth lawyer award in 2018. His law firm, Terai Law Associates based in Tinkune, having large number of criminal and civil cases.

As a constitution lawyer, his litigation has contributed to ensuring federalism in Nepal in The Constitution of Nepal 2015. The Supreme Court of Nepal, on 20 June 2015 issued an interim order against the implementation of a 16-point agreement that was agreed upon amongst the four major parties - Nepali Congress, CPN-UML, CPN-Maoist, and Nepal Democratic Forum - on 8 June 2015 to promulgate the constitution without federalism.

Although The Constitution of Nepal 2015 - which is the first constitution of the country drafted through people's elected representatives - was claimed the best constitution in the world by many, his interviews and writings consistently lent to the idea that the document is controversial and that it should be amended. In an interview with BBC media, translated and transcribed by Nepali Timesm he writes: "Halt constitution-drafting' Advocate Dipendra Jha with Rabindra Mishra in BBC Nepali Service, 9 September"

He has been quoted and mentioned in several news reports and interview of several media, including Al Zajeera English, AFP news, The Kathmandu Post, The Himalayan Times, Hindustan Times, The Times of India etc. on contemporary politics and constitutional and social justice issues of Nepal. Now, since 2022, he has been pleading more than 700 case of criminal, civil, corporate and constitutional at Supreme Court, Special Court, High court and District court.

=== Human Rights Defender ===
He is a prominent human rights defender voicing the human rights concerns of the marginalised communities. He is the founder of Terai Human Rights Defenders Alliance (commonly known as THRD Alliance), which is an independent and active human rights non-government organization. He left THRD Alliance in 2018 after his appointment as the Chief Attorney of the Madhesh Government. He didn't return in the organization after that. But THRD Alliance played crucial role during the Madhesh Movement in his leadership and documented several human rights violations and presented to UNOHCHR in Geneva. He filed Early Day Motion(EDM) in the British Parliament against human rights violation and discriminatory content of the constitution.

Key Completed Tasks

S.N	Years	Tasks Completed	Remarks
1.	2016	Expert Team Member, TRC Investigation Procedure Drafting	TRC
2.	2014	Expert Team Member, Constituent Assembly Capacity Building Committee	Constitution Making process
3.	2011	UNICEF Short-Term National Consultant, Assessment/Review of 1612 Task Force	UN
4.	2012	Consultant, Review Rights, Democracy and Inclusion Fund	Donors Assessment
5.	2011	International Commission of Jurists (ICJ), Consultant, Terai Assessment 'access to justice’ Project	ICJ
6.	2010	ICJ Consultant, Preparation of Report on 'Commission of Inquiry	Report Writing
7.	2008	Supporting AI team from London to conduct fact finding mission on human rights crisis in Southern Tarai Nepal	Amnesty International Consultant,
8.	2007	June to 2017 June: Legal Researcher, Asian Legal Resources Center, Hong Kong	Member AHRC
9.	2007	UN Consultant, UNESCAP, Bangkok, Collected data related to Rights-based Approach on a selected housing project	UN
10.	2006	Research Consultant for Forum-Asia, South-East Asian project on Ethnic Minorities & Indigenous Population	Forum-Asia
11.	2005	Project Assistant-National Human Rights Commission, Nepal	NHRC

=== Author ===
He is the author of Federal Nepal: Trials and Tribulations, which narrates the story of the constitution making process of Nepal. The book review published in The Record read: "Asides from facts and figures on the marginalized, his book has anecdotes and reviews of key political events, and includes the reactions of various Nepali power-centers and the international community towards Nepal's constitution." The book is available on Amazon.

As author, he also wrote Op-Ed on current affairs of politics, constitution, human rights, rule of law and democracy for The Kathmandu Post and its sister publication Kantipur in Nepali language and other online news portals, including Online Khabar and Setopati. His all articles are available online on the page of The Kathmandu Post.

== Legal career ==
After getting a legal practice license from Nepal Bar council on 2011 July 17th (2068/04/01) he started active legal practice in the partnership of law firm in Hanumansthan for a year then he established his own law firm named Terai Law Associates whose named has been changed later on as D.J Law Associates(https://www.djlawassociates.com/) since then he engaged in various cases such as criminal and corruption cases litigation. On July 17th, 2026 he completed his 15 years of continuous legal practice and entered in 16 years of legal practice. Since then he appeared almost in more than 1500 cases at various courts such as Supreme Court, Special court, District courts and Hight courts. He is a member of Supreme Court Bar Association of Nepal (https://supremecourtbar.org.np/ with license number of 13464.

== Personal life ==
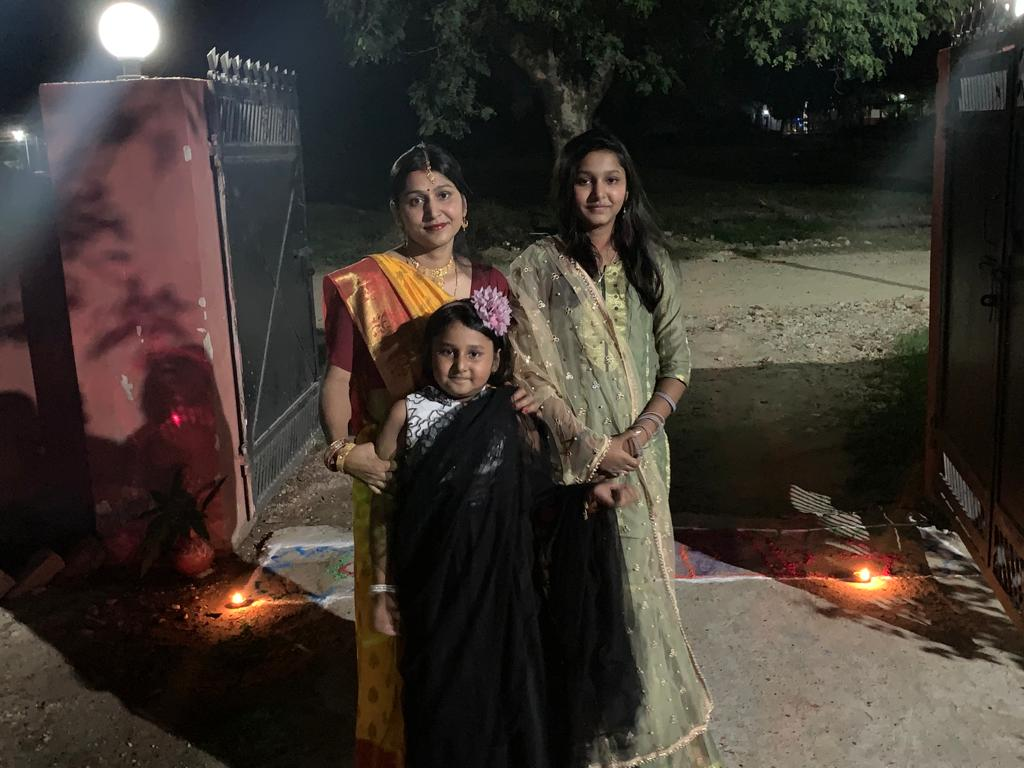
Anu, Diya and Aradhya Jha

He was born to a lower-middle-class family in the district of Mahottari District village name Madai ward no-3. His father Udita Narayan Jha got retired from Nepal food cooperation as a junior clerk -Subba and his mother Kula Devi is from India Bihar. He married Anu Jha in 2004. They have two daughters Diya Jha (pursuing law degree) and Aradhya Jha in LA school. He and his spouse are from Mahottari District.
