= Philippines–Canada Task Force on Human Rights =

The Philippines–Canada Task Force on Human Rights (PCTFHR) is a Canadian Human Rights group which expresses solidarity with the Filipino people.

== History ==
The group was formed in Vancouver in 2006 as a coalition of progressive Filipino organizations from across Canada as part of a larger international campaign to Stop the Killings. A PCTFHR fact-finding mission was organized for November 2006. The group consisted of nine Canadians - lawyers, a teacher, a nurse and other community organizers - who visited victims of the political killings and repression in the Philippines. As well, the group met with Congress representatives, senators, Peter Sutherland, the Canadian Ambassador to the Philippines.

The group split up into subgroups to evaluate the deteriorating human rights situation in various regions. The areas of Metro Manila, Cordillera, Southern Tagalog and Central Luzon were selected. One of the Congress representatives met by the fact-finding mission was Rep. Crispin Beltran who had been detained for almost a year. The PCTFHR gained national and international attention after three members were detained by the military for several hours. Maj. Gen. Alexander Yano, head of the Armed Forces Southern Luzon Command (Solcom), ordered a probe of the incident, "after receiving 'conflicting' accounts of the incident." However, the supposed probe never made its findings public.

The PCTFHR found the Government of the Republic of the Philippines and the Armed Forces of the Philippines responsible for the extrajudicial political killings between 2001 and 2006, calling on Canada to suspend the $22 million in foreign aid until the human rights situation improves. A Filipino-Canadian lawyer who heads the PCTFHR, explained that, "the soldiers and police accosted [the PCTFHR] as though we were criminals [...] preventing us from speaking to residents of areas where there are reported human-rights violations. They seem to be following orders to bar human-rights observers. Canada's Ambassador to the Philippines, Peter Sutherland, referencing calls by Wal-Mart, American Eagle, Gap and other garment manufacturers to stop the killing of union leaders, told the group, "when the international business community says something, she (President Arroyo) has to pay more attention."

Presidential Press Secretary Ignacio Bunye called the group "self-proclaimed human rights activists", "propaganda tools of the revolutionary left", "self-serving" and "arrogant". Further, he deplored the groups', "pseudo investigations on so-called extrajudicial killings ...and... arrogance [...] to turn this issue into a diplomatic matter."

== Campaign in Canada ==
The PCTFHR has organized presentations, screenings, concerts, and other meetings to promote the cause of human rights in the Philippines. Meetings with Members of Canada's Parliament has led to increased awareness on the topic and the possibility of a parliamentary hearing on human rights in the Philippines, including Liberal human rights critic, Irwin Cotler. Other organizations, such as the United Church of Canada, have also expressed support on this topic, creating a parliamentary petition to be submitted to Canada's parliament.
