= INSEC =

INSEC (Nepali: ईन्सेक), which stands for Informal Sector Service Centre, is one of key non-government human rights organizations working for the promotion of human rights in Nepal. It also runs the human rights news portal, INSEC Online

== Human Rights Year Book ==
INSEC publishes Human Rights Year Book annually, that records the assessment and progress on human rights in Nepal throughout a year.

=== Human Rights Year Book, 2017 ===
About its latest Human Rights Year Book, 2017, INSEC Online writes: "Perpetual instabilities and hindrance in governance will be the direct adverse effects if the three levels of election is not held as per the provisions of the Constitution. A constitutional vacuum will prevail. It will further propel emergence of similar chaotic situation as experienced after the dissolution of the first Constituent Assembly. A constitutional crisis may emerge and we may need to start a new struggle to get rid of that crisis. This in turn will foster political turmoil with the emergence of new actors and start altogether a different chapter in our democratic life as per our experience in the past." The complete book can be accessed from here.

=== Human Rights Year Book, 2016 ===
About its Human Rights Year Book, 2016, Kathmandu Post writes: "The Informal Sector Service Centre (Insec) has reported an increase in the number of incidents of human rights violation in 2015. While hailing the new constitution as the biggest achievement of the year, the Insec’s Human Rights Year Book, 2016,....has noted Madhes movement as one of the major incidents that saw gross violations of human rights. During the stir that lasted almost five months Insec recorded 49 deaths, of which 34 people, including five children, were killed by the state. Thirteen people, including 10 policemen and one child, were killed by non-state actors." This book can be accessed from here
