= Unimondo =

Non-governmental organization

Unimondo is an Italy-based non-governmental organisation working in issues related to Information and communication technologies. It has been involved in reporting on and working in South-East Europe. Its work covers Albania, Bosnia-Herzegovina, Croatia, Kosovo, North Macedonia, Serbia and Montenegro.

== Reporting the Balkans ==
It has collaborated with Osservatorio Balcani, an Italian alternative agency, reporting on issues in the Balkans. Unimondo says its mission is to support pluralist information on issues like sustainable development, environment, peace and human rights.

== 'Regional edition' of Oneworld.net ==
In 2003, Unimoondo decided to engage directly in the region. This resulted in the launch of a "regional edition" of OneWorld.net.

It has been focussing on OneWorld Radio SEE, which is meant to be a multi-language web-based audio exchange platform for 81 radio stations in the region. OneWorld SEE is a multi-language website, that tries to offer access to information about sustainable local development, human rights, democracy and civil society across the Balkans

== Changing times ==
In 2004, the project evolved into an independent and regionally-run foundation, with seven member NGOs, headquartered in Sarajevo and called the OneWorld Platform for South East Europe.
