= African Movement of Working Children and Youth =

Network of associations of working children

The African Movement of Working Children and Youth (previously abbreviated as AMWCY), or Mouvement africain des enfants et jeunes travailleurs (MAEJT) in French, is a network of associations of working children from 28 African countries. The purpose of this child-led transcontinental grassroots movement is to protect working minors through the establishment of local benefit societies, awareness campaigns to influence public opinion, and negotiations with political authorities. The movement has a bulletin entitled Lettre de la rue and in 1999 it published the book Voix des enfants d'Afrique ("Voice of the children of Africa"), which has been translated into several languages.

The movement was formally created in July 1994 in Bouaké (Côte d'Ivoire), where the first international meeting was held. At the Bouaké meeting, the movement's "vision" and a list of 12 priority rights for working children were outlined, called the 12 Rights of the MAEJT. The mouvement is supported by the adult-led child protection organization ENDA Jeunesse Action International (EJAI, also known as JEUDA), which is headquartered in Dakar, Senegal, and part of the umbrella organization ENDA Tiers-Monde.

== Vision ==
All African children must be born and grow in good condition, and enjoy their full rights to thrive, while at the same time helping their communities to develop harmoniously in peace and in a favorable environment.

== Priority rights (in arbitrary order) ==
1. The right to be respected.
2. The right to be taught a trade.
3. The right to stay in the village (no rural exodus).
4. The right to work in a safe environment.
5. The right to light and limited work.
6. The right to rest when sick.
7. The right to be listened to.
8. The right to healthcare.
9. The right to learn to read and to write.
10. The right to play.
11. The right to self-expression and to form organizations.
12. The right to equitable legal aid, in case of difficulty.

== Reach ==
The MAEJT (formerly referred to in English as the AMWCY) has gained the support of ECOWAS, Save the Children, Plan International, ILO, Terre des Hommes, Ignite Philanthropy, UNESCO and the Oak Foundation among others. As of 2026, has branches in the following 28 countries Angola, Benin, Burkina Faso, Burundi, Cameroon, Central Africa, Chad, Côte d'Ivoire, Democratic Republic of Congo, Ethiopia, The Gambia, Ghana, Guinea, Guinea-Bissau, Kenya, Liberia, Madagascar, Mali, Mauritania, Niger, Nigeria, Rwanda, Senegal, Sierra Leone,Tanzania, Togo, Zambia and Zimbabwe.

The MAEJT has also established relationships with similar organizations in other parts of the world (for example India and South America) and MAEJT delegates have been invited to several international meetings about minors and their rights, such as the 1996 UNICEF convention on minor labour in Africa and the 2002 special UN session on infancy.

== See also ==
- Child labour
- African Charter on the Rights and Welfare of the Child
- Convention on the Rights of the Child
- Exploitation of labour
- Modern slavery
- Pan-Africanism
