= Keyvan Rafiee =

Iranian human rights activist

- کیوان رفیعی
- Born: Iran
- Occupations: Political activist, journalist
- Known for: Founder and director of Human Rights Activists in Iran (HRAI), and Human Rights Activists News Agency (HRANA)
- Website: hra-iran.org

Keyvan Rafiee (Persian: کیوان رفیعی) is an Iranian political activist. He is a former prisoner of conscience, and was arrested six times for his activities starting in 2003. He is one of the founders of Human Rights Activists in Iran (HRAI) and Human Rights Activists News Agency (HRANA) in the United States.

== Activities and detentions ==
Keyvan Rafiee was first arrested by the Ministry of Intelligence and Security (MOIS) for protesting the election process of the Assembly of Experts in Gorgan city in Golestan Province. The arrest was apparently due to what was believed to be questioning the authority of the Supreme Leader's representative and the President of Azad University. He was kept in detention for 13 days; upon his release, he was denied the right to return to the university and continue his education.

Rafiee continued his activities and in 2004 was arrested during the anniversary of student protests on July 9; for one month he was kept in temporary detention center, ward 209 of the MOIS in Evin Prison before being released on bail. Rafiee was once again arrested on May 23, 2005, less than a year later, charged with activities aimed at boycotting the ninth presidential election, when the disputed elections brought Mahmood Ahmadinejad to power for the first term. He spent most of his detention in solitary confinement and then was incarcerated in ward 209 of the MOIS in Evin Prison, eventually being released on bail until his trial. The accusations finally led to a year of imprisonment which was then suspended for three years.

For the fourth time, Rafiee was arrested in front of Tehran University on the anniversary of December 7 (National Student's Day) only a few days after being released; this time he was kept in detention for only a short while and was released on bail at the same night.

In 2006, Rafiee founded the Human Right Activists in Iran along with Jamal Hosseini and Mahdi Khodaei. However, only a few months after starting this organization, he was arrested on May 1 by the security police as he was protesting among the workers of Tehran Bus Driver's Union on the International Workers' Day. He was beaten by police forces at the time of arrest but was released later because he used an alias.

Rafiee's last arrest was recorded on July 9, 2006, due to the latest policy of the MOIS for arresting individuals with detention records and under the pretext of crime prevention without providing any particular charge. The Ministry was concerned about activists organizing and taking part in protests in front of Tehran University. He was then transferred to ward 209 of Evin Prison, even though he had not been charged with a crime, where he spent more than 100 days in solitary confinement.

Following this period he was transferred to open prison and other wards of Evin Prison. After 15 months he was charged with actions against national security, was put on trial and sentenced by Judge Abolqasem Salavati; considering the time he had already spent in prison, he was finally released on December 22, 2007. After gaining his freedom and as he was once again summoned to the revolutionary court, he left Iran and sought political asylum in the United States.

== Activities in the Human Rights Activists in Iran (HRAI) ==
Rafiee is the founder of the Human Rights Activists in Iran (HRAI), and he worked alongside Jamal Hosseini and Mahdi Khodaei. Since its founding in 2006, he took up various roles at HRAI, including those of spokesman and director, and a range of executive activities in this human rights organization. Rafiee is the author of a number of articles and books.

Additionally, Rafiee has established connections with various groups and reported on many issues concerning Iran's ethnic and religious minorities, workers, labor unionists, and political activists. He has trained staff, authored comprehensive reports and articles, established Committee for Opposing Censorship, established bilingual (Persian and English) websites, established coalitions with other non-profit and human rights organizations around the globe, founded Peace Mark, a monthly publication dedicated to human rights and political analysis, established and conducted Annual Statistical Analysis of human rights violations in Iran, used by major organizations around the world. He has also worked with United Nations, U.S. State Department, U.S. Congress, and other non-governmental organizations to raise awareness about human rights violations in Iran.

Rafiee founded the Human Rights Activists News Agency (HRANA) in the United States, reporting on Iranian human rights violations and news.

== Publications ==
- Book titled "An Autopsy of Human Rights" on human rights education – 2008
- Research Booklet titled "From Prison to Prison" about security and secret prisons in Iran – 2008
- Booklet titled "The Nest of Corruption" about widespread corruption in Iranian prisons – 2008
- Annual Listing of Iranian political prisoners – from 2009 to 2014
- Pamphlet titled "Behind the Curtains of Social Welfare" – 2009
- Rafiee, Keyvan (March 10, 2016). "A Look Inside the Human Rights Activists in Iran / Keyvan Rafiee". Peace Mark Magazine.
- Rafiei, Keyvan (October 25, 2016). "A Look at Iran's Cyber Activities; In Conversation with Colin Anderson and Keyvan Rafiei". Peace Mark Magazine.
- Rafiee, Keyvan, ed. (September 11, 2021). Human Rights Activists in Iran: History, Obstacles, Achievements. Barnes & Noble Press. ISBN 9781737066804.

== See also ==
- Human Rights Activists in Iran
