= Amnesty Nepal =

International non-governmental organization

Amnesty International Nepal
- Founded: 1969
- Founders: Nutan Thapaliya
- Type: Nonprofit; NGO
- Headquarters: Kathmandu,
- Location: Nepal
- Services: Protecting human rights
- Fields: Legal advocacy, Media attention, direct-appeal campaigns, research, lobbying
- Members: More than seven thousand members and supporters in Nepal
- Chair: Bipin Budhathoki
- Key people: Director, Nirajan Thapaliya
- Website: https://amnestynepal.org

Amnesty International Nepal (also referred to as Amnesty Nepal or AI Nepal) was founded in Nepal in 1969 by Nutan Thapaliya as an affiliate of the global human rights movement Amnesty International. Two years later, AI Nepal received the status of a "section" at the International Council Meeting (ICM) of Amnesty International in 1971. Due to the difficult environment caused by the repressive Panchyat regime and other difficulties, AI Nepal was dissolved as a Section in 1982. However, the Amnesty movement survived and continued on in Nepal at the membership level. After the restoration of democracy in 1990, the AI movement gained further strength in Nepal, and a Coordinating Structure led by Mr Chitra Niraula was constituted by the International Secretariat. The AI movement in Nepal was again recognized as a Section of Amnesty International in 1993. Currently, AI Nepal has over seven thousand active members affiliated through its various local structures such as Groups and Youth Networks.

== History ==
Amnesty International Nepal was founded in 1969 by lawyer Nutan Thapaliya and two years later, it was recognized as a section of Amnesty International, which was founded in London in July 1961 by English barrister Peter Benenson. Benenson was influenced by his friend Louis Blom-Cooper, who led a political prisoners’ campaign.

The Amnesty Nepal section flourished under the leadership of its first chair, late Hrishikesh Shah. However, due to unfavourable situations, Amnesty Nepal was dissolved in 1982. Subsequently, some of Amnesty’s local Groups, still motivated to work alongside human rights issues and strengthen the movement, continued to engage in different activities to further the organization’s vision.

== Structure ==
Amnesty International Nepal is a membership-based organization. It is entirely made up of voluntary members. The General Assembly is the highest body, which meets annually, called Annual General Meeting (AGM). The AGM is the top-most policy making assembly held on an annual basis. All of Amnesty Groups in Nepal participate in the policy-making process by sending representative/s to the AGM. The AGM guarantees deliberation and dialogue on Amnesty Nepal’s policy, strategy, operational plan, budget, activity report and audited financial report. Similarly, the AGM adopts the by-laws and statutes of the organization. All policies, both internal and external are finalized at the AGM. The AGM is conducted in an open, democratic manner, wherein every two years, the election of the National Board is held.

The National Board is elected by, and accountable to, the General Assembly. The role of the National Board is to take decisions on behalf of Amnesty Nepal, govern the National Secretariat including groups, implement the strategy laid out by the General Assembly and ensure compliance with the organization's statutes.

The National Secretariat is responsible for the conduct and daily affairs of Amnesty Nepal under direction from the National Board.

== Key Areas ==
There are six key areas which Amnesty deals with:

- Women's, children's, minorities' and indigenous rights
- Ending torture
- Abolition of the death penalty
- Rights of refugees
- Rights of prisoners of conscience
- Protection of human dignity.

Campaigns to mobilize public opinion can take the form of individual, country, or thematic campaigns. Many techniques are deployed, such as direct appeals (for example, letter writing), media and publicity work, and public demonstrations. Often, fund-raising is integrated with campaigning. In 2018, the organization started to adopt a new communications strategy based on a message of shared humanity and a hope-based communications approach.

== Funding ==
Amnesty International Nepal is financed largely by fees and donations from its worldwide membership. It says that it does not accept donations from governments or governmental organizations. According to the AI website,

these personal and unaffiliated donations allow AI to maintain full independence from any and all governments, political ideologies, economic interests or religions. We neither seek nor accept any funds for human rights research from governments or political parties and we accept support only from businesses that have been carefully vetted. By way of ethical fundraising leading to donations from individuals, we are able to stand firm and unwavering in our defence of universal and indivisible human rights.

However, AI has received grants over the past ten years from some governments but these funds are only used "in support of its human rights education work."
