= Kitty Anderson (activist) =

Icelandic intersex activist

- Occupation: Community activist
- Known for: Intersex activist, co-chair of OII Europe

Kitty Anderson is an Icelandic intersex activist. She is a co-chair of European intersex organization OII Europe, a co-founder of Intersex Iceland, and chairman of the board of the Icelandic Human Rights Centre. She has been described as a "leading voice of the intersex movement in Europe."

== Background ==
Kitty Anderson was born with androgen insensitivity. She found out when she was 13, but only found out she was born with internal testes when she was aged 22. Anderson has reported that her "mother was told to lie" to her until she was aged 13.

== Activism ==
Anderson co-founded Intersex Iceland in 2014, and currently serves as its chairperson. She is co-chair and spokesperson of OII Europe and chairperson of the board of the Icelandic Human Rights Centre. She has also served on the board of Samtökin '78, Iceland's national queer organization, and the national Ministry of Welfare Queer Committee from 2014 to 2016. Anderson has spoken against secrecy and shame associated with intersex:

When I found out I was 13 and I completely freaked out. There can be a lot of secrecy and stigma related to being intersex and it was something that had been kept from me. But when my cousin – who is also intersex – was born a couple of years later, my family didn’t keep it a secret and it was a healing process for all of us

She also campaigns against intersex medical interventions. In an interview with NIKK, Anderson has stated that "surgeries will continue until we get a law that prohibits them".

Anderson has presented to the Council of Europe Committee on Bioethics, and speaks at a range of conferences, media, and human rights institutions across Scandinavia and Europe.

In 2015, Anderson campaigned to change terminology in the biology curriculum in Icelandic schools, and dictionaries, after finding out that the word intersex was being translated into Icelandic as "freak". The publisher of the school text later apologized.
