= Hossein Rafiee =

Iranian academic and activist (born 1945)

Mohammad Hossein Rafiee Fanood
- محمد حسین رفیعی فنود
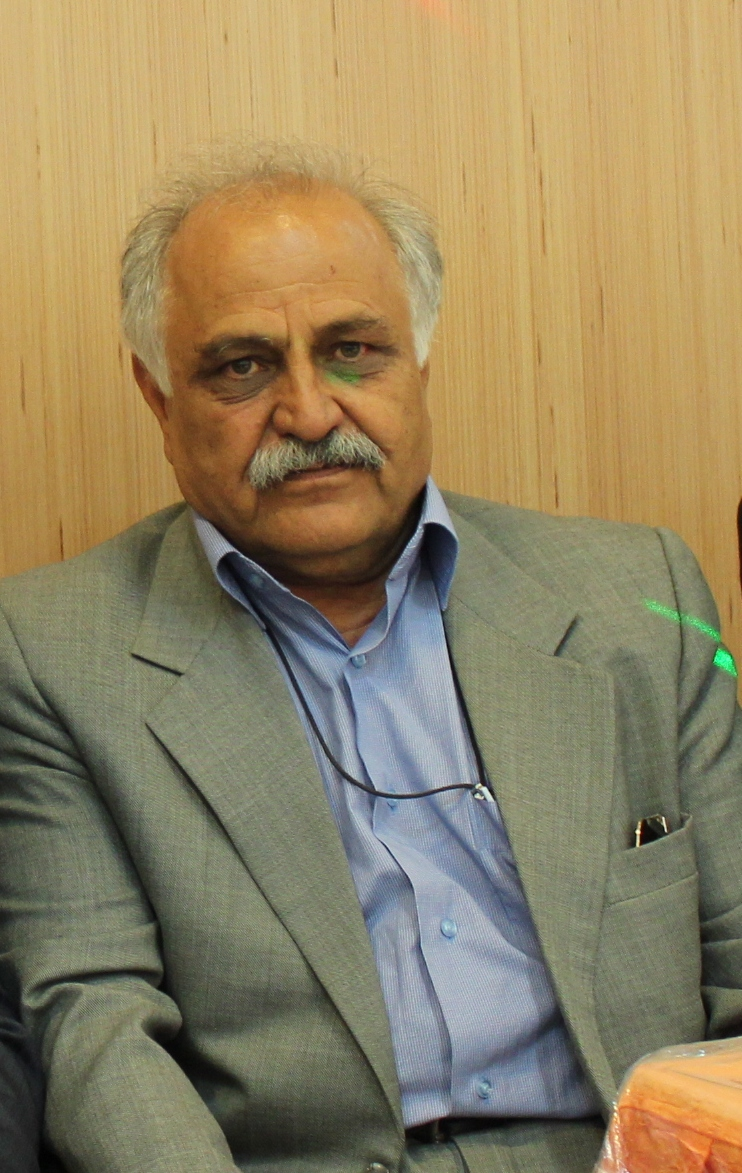

Personal details
- Born: 8 March 1945 Birjand, Iran
- Party: Nationalist-Religious
- Spouse: Derakhshandeh Teimourian
- Website: www.mhrafieefanood.com (In Persian)

Mohammad Hossein Rafiee Fanood (Persian: محمد حسین رفیعی فنود) (born 9 April 1945) is an Iranian scholar, pro-democracy activist, and an author. He is a retired professor of polymer chemistry at University of Tehran, and a member of Meli-Mazhabi (National-Religious) Alliance and Iran's National Peace Council. The Iranian regime arrested him in 2015 for his political views.

== Life ==
Due to his political views and political-economical-social analysis he was arrested together with the other members of Meli-Mazhabi Alliance in 2000. Subsequently, in 2003, he was sentenced to four years of imprisonment and banned from any "social activity" for two years.

Threaten and pressure on Hossein Rafiee has been increased by Iran's intelligence and security apparatus, in 2014, after he wrote a comprehensive 120-page analysis of Iran's nuclear situation, titled "The Geneva agreement", in support of "Geneva interim agreement on Iranian nuclear program" between Iran and P5+1 countries.

He has written several letters to President Rouhani and explained the pressures he has been facing due to his public support of the Geneva nuclear agreement. In one of his letters he mentioned:

"...as I am 70 years old and the period of worldliness, power and post seeking is over for me, I intend neither to immigrate nor to give up on confronting those who think the only solution for Iran's problems are; prison, immigration, death, threats, restriction, isolation and suppression of intellectuals and political-social activists. Thus, I am ready for death..."

In May 2015, he was sentenced to six years in prison and received a two-year ban on political and journalistic activities. His sentences linked to his activities and support of Nuclear deal.

On 16 June 2015, he was arrested without a court order issued by judge in the street by Iranian security forces. He had been in hunger strike refused to take his medication in protest to the arrest for four days. Since then he has been kept in ward 8 of Evin prison under harsh condition. According to Amnesty International Hossein Rafiee is considered as prisoner of conscience.

== International supports ==
Many international organisations sent letters to Iranian authorities in support of Hossein Rafiee, demanding his release such as: "Scholars at Risks", Committee of Concerned Scientists, American Chemical Society and National Academy of Sciences. In February 2016 more than 300 Scholars and scientists in a letter to president of Iran demanded his release. Again in April 2016, about 60 North American professors wrote a letter to President Rouhani and demanded his release.

== Selected books ==
1. Ravand jodayee, 1980.
2. The technology of polymers, 1997.
3. The development of Iran, 2001.
4. The other side of the globalization, 2002.
5. The black winter form "Baghdad's spring", 2009.
6. Fifty years of petrochemical industry in Iran, 2011.
7. The Geneva agreement, 2014.
8. From Shariati to Meli-Mazhabi.
9. "Legal subversion".
10. Where are they taken "Islamic Republic of Iran"?
