= Human Rights Activists in Iran =

Iranian non-governmental organization in Virginia, US

- مجموعه فعالان حقوق بشر در ایران
- Founded: 2006; 20 years ago
- Founder: Keyvan Rafiee
- Type: Non-profit NGO
- Tax ID no.: 80-0841029
- Legal status: Charitable organization
- Purpose: Human rights
- Location: Fairfax Towne Centre, Fairfax, Virginia, United States
- Region served: Iran
- Employees: 30
- Volunteers: 3,000
- Website: hra-iran.org

Human Rights Activists in Iran (or HRA, HRAI) is a non-profit non-governmental organization that covers human rights issues in Iran. The organization is based in Fairfax, Virginia, United States. It was established by Keyvan Rafiee in Iran and has expanded from a small network of volunteers into a multi-divisional nonprofit headquartered in Washington, D.C., with the largest in-country volunteer network of any Iranian human rights group. It is also known by the name of its news agency, the Human Rights Activists News Agency (or HRANA).

== History ==
The Human Rights Activists in Iran traces its roots to February 2006, when activist Keyvan Rafiee formally announced the formation of Human Rights Activists in Iran when he was living in Iran. Joined shortly afterwards by Seyed Jamal Hosseini, the new group focused on political prisoners and prisoners of conscience despite having no external funding or infrastructure.

In its first two years, HRA organized family visits, street awareness campaigns and published its first educational booklet, positioning itself as a young, egalitarian organization committed to non discrimination.

Between 2008 and early 2010, a brief improvement in the civic space allowed HRA to register committees across the country, launch the first Persian language human rights news agency (HRANA), and introduce more than thirty public officials and twenty five specialised committees. Activities included nationwide "Right to Education" gatherings for Baháʼí students, the Peace Mark monthly magazine, and a global campaign to halt the execution of Kurdish teacher Farzad Kamangar.

In 2009, HRA also launched the HRA Study Center and Library, which operates as HRANA's subsidiary, and serves as the organization's digital library.

The disputed 2009 presidential election in Iran brought a downfall, and on 1 March 2010, security forces arrested at least forty eight HRA members in coordinated raids, seized digital assets and aired televised "confessions." The resulting prison sentences exceeded one hundred years in aggregate.

In the aftermath of the 2010 raids, the surviving members living in exile after being forced to flee Iran restructured HRA as a U.S. registered 501(c)(3) charity.

The rebuilt organization emphasised technology, data driven research, and international advocacy. It joined prominent global coalitions, including the World Coalition Against the Death Penalty, Civicus, the World Organization Against Torture, and the Coalition for the International Criminal Court.

The organization has presented evidence and briefings before the European Parliament, the U.S. Congress, the Parliament of the United Kingdom, the UN Human Rights Committee, and the UN General Assembly.

In 2010, the organization founded The Fourth Pillar Committee, an initiative to facilitate the free exchange of information and the development of a secure and cost-free internet by offering Iranian users technical services like VPNs. Later in 2010, it also launched a Statistics and Documents Center, a database archiving daily incident reports for quantitative analysis.

In 2014, the United Nations special rapporteur, Javaid Rehman, cited HRA as one of the three leading Iranian human rights organizations.

In 2019, HRA founded Kardanan, a labour rights legal clinic, and Spreading Justice, a database profiling thousands of alleged human rights violators. Later in 2023, it introduced Pasdaran Documentation Project (PDP), an initiative analysing the role of the Islamic Revolutionary Guard Corps in abuses.

HRA operates under a collective management model overseen by an elected Board of Directors. Strategic guidance is provided by an advisory board comprising international jurists, civil society leaders and former political prisoners. The board members include Brian Currin, Sima Samar, Farhad Sabetan, Şanar Yurdatapan, and posthumously Tahir Elçi and Michael Cromartie.

HRA has received funding from the National Endowment for Democracy (NED), a quasi-autonomous non-governmental organization funded almost entirely by the U.S. government that finances political and civil-society initiatives abroad as an instrument of U.S. foreign policy. HRA states on its website that it began accepting donations from the NED in 2011. Since then, the NED has awarded HRA grants totaling $980,998, with the latest grant to HRA reported in the NED's fiscal year 2021 Form 990 filing. Between fiscal years 2010 and 2021, the NED awarded grants to HRA every year except fiscal year 2016, with the smallest grant awarded in 2010 ($59,000) and the largest in 2021 ($138,000). The average size of these grants was about $89,000.

== Principles and objectives ==
HRA's purpose is to promote and defend internationally recognised human rights in Iran by exposing violations and supporting victims. According to the organization's charter and public statements, it pursues this mandate through four complementary strategies:

- Documentation – Compiling case files on arbitrary arrests, torture, discrimination and other abuses; HRA reports are regularly referenced by international NGOs, UN experts and global media.
- Legal support – Providing pro bono legal representation, monitoring trials, and assisting the families of political detainees and other victims..
- Legal advocacy and accountability – Creating strategic pathways to accountability by engaging with policymakers, legal experts, and international mechanisms. This includes briefing decision-makers, submitting evidence to relevant bodies, and building targeted campaigns to advance justice, deter future abuses, and promote systemic reforms.
- Partnerships – Working with domestic and international civil society organizations, legislators, and journalists to amplify findings and strengthen impact.

== Publications ==
- Peace Mark (monthly magazine): The first specialized human rights periodical produced inside Iran available in both print and digital formats (2009–present).
- Rafiee, Keyvvan (2021). Human Rights Activists in Iran: History, Obstacles, Achievements. Human Rights Activists. ISBN 9781737066811.

== See also ==
- Iran International
- Human rights in the Islamic Republic of Iran
- List of human rights organisations
