= Asian Forum for Human Rights and Development =

Regional human rights organisation

Asian Forum for Human Rights and Development (FORUM-ASIA)
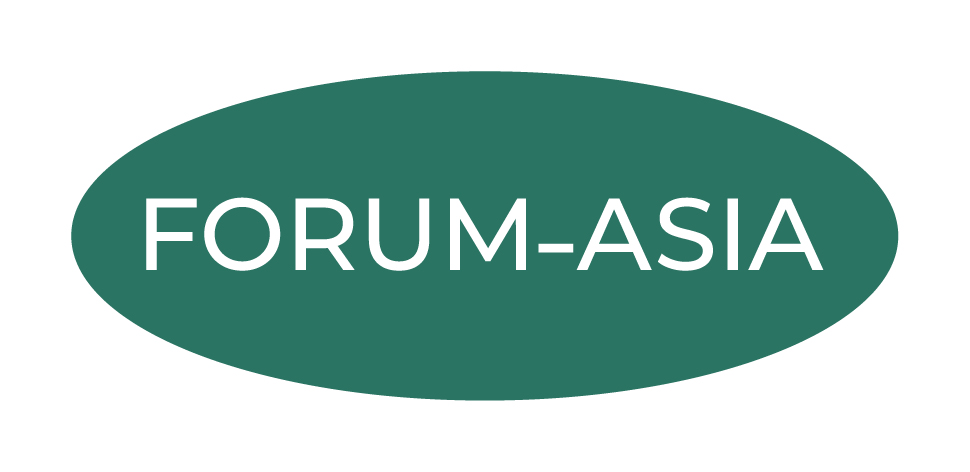
- Founded: 1991
- Type: Non-profit; NGO
- Location: Bangkok, Geneva, Kathmandu, Jakarta
- Members: 85 human rights organisations in 23 countries
- Website: www.forum-asia.org

The Asian Forum for Human Rights and Development (FORUM-ASIA) is a membership-based regional human rights organisation with 85 member organisations in 23 countries across Asia. It states that its focus is the promotion and protection of human rights, including the right to development.

FORUM-ASIA was founded in 1991 in Manila, The Philippines and opened its Regional Secretariat in Bangkok in 1992. Subsequently, offices have also been opened in Geneva, Jakarta and Kathmandu. It has consultative status with the United Nations Economic and Social Council since 2004.

The organization's stated mission is to support a community in Asia where human rights are respected and realized in accordance with international norms, with a focus on marginalized groups.

== History ==
=== Founding (1991–1994) ===
In December 1991, a regional consultation, 'On Collaboration between Human Rights Organisations in South and South-East Asia', was held in Manila, the Philippines. During the meeting a new network was established, the Asian Forum for Human Rights and Development (Forum-Asia).

The idea for the consultation came from D.J. Ravindran, former Legal Officer for Asia for the International Commission of Jurists (ICJ). Prior to the consultation he had visited several countries in the region to gain input for a working paper to be used during the event.

This first consultation had participants from nine countries representing 19 organisations, who became the founding members of Forum-Asia. These organisations were:

- Ain O Salish Kendra (ASK) from Bangladesh
- Legal Resource for Social Action (LRSA) from India
- Indonesia Legal Aid Foundation (YLBHI) from Indonesia
- Suara Rakyat Malaysia (SUARAM) from Malaysia
- Informal Sector Service Centre (INSEC) from Nepal
- Human Rights Commission of Pakistan (HRCP) from Pakistan
- Task Force Detainees of the Philippines (TFDP) from the Philippines
- Philippine Alliance of Human Rights Advocates (PAHRA) from the Philippines
- Protestant Lawyers League of the Philippines (PLLP) from the Philippines
- Pilipina Legal Resources Center (PLRC) from the Philippines
- Paglilingkod Batas Pangkapapatiran Foundation (PBPF) from the Philippines
- Tanggol-Kalikasan (TK) from the Philippines
- Paralegal Training and Service Center (PTSC) from the Philippines
- Movement for Inter-Racial Justice and Equality (MIRJE) from Sri Lanka
- Law and Society Trust (LST) from Sri Lanka
- Information Human Rights Documentation Centre (INFORM) from Sri Lanka
- Union for Civil Liberty (UCL) from Thailand
- Coordination Group for Religion in Society (CGRS) from Thailand
- Friends of Women Foundation (FWF) from Thailand.

The initial objectives of Forum-Asia were to 'conduct programmes to further strengthen the effectiveness of human rights organisations in the region and to facilitate collaboration between them.' Founders established the network to create an Asian-led regional framework, rather than relying on groups based in Europe or North America, to support local human rights defenders and victims of human rights abuses.

There was a conscious choice to include both human rights and development in the name. While most, if not all, organisations initially involved were human rights organisations, there was a recognition of the interconnectedness of the human rights concerns that many of the founding members worked on with socio-economic development, including developmental and economic inequality, and market globalisation. Since its founding, the organization's activities have focused primarily on human rights initiatives rather than development programs.

The first months after the founding meeting were spent drafting proposals and raising funds. D.J. Ravindran was asked to help develop and establish the organisation as a consultant, and was joined in this task by Chalida Tajaroensuk. During the 1991 meeting it had been suggested that Forum-Asia should be hosted by one of the founding organisations. The UCL, based in Bangkok, Thailand became the host to the regional secretariat of the network. Ms. Songphorn Tajaroensuk became the first Secretary General of Forum-Asia.

The first activity that Forum-Asia undertook was organised jointly with TFDP and PTSC. It was a 'Regional Training Programme on Fact-Finding and Documentation of Human Rights Violations', which took place on September 27-October 12, 1992 in Manila. It was an indication of the initial focus of the network. During its initial years, Forum-Asia's activities focused on capacity building and sharing technical skills among its member organizations.

In 1993, Forum-Asia became involved in the UN World Conference on Human Rights, including in the preparatory process that resulted in the 'Final Declaration of the Regional Meeting for Asia of the World Conference on Human Rights or Bangkok Declaration'. This was the start of the advocacy component of Forum-Asia's work. Advocacy subsequently became a core component of the organization's operations.

On October 14–17, 1994, the first General Assembly (GA) of Forum-Asia was held at the Wangree Resort in Nakorn Nayok, Thailand. The first General Assembly focused on reviewing the initial three years of operations. During the meeting, members voted to continue and expand the network's operations.

Following the 1994 meeting, members resolved to establish a permanent Secretariat. It remained an unregistered association hosted by UCL.

=== Consolidation and growth (1994–2004) ===
With Forum-Asia no longer being in the experimental phase, the time to strengthen and expand the network started after the GA of 1994. New strategies and programmes were developed, including diplomacy, human rights education, advocacy and campaigning. In 1995, the Secretariat expanded its scope to include programs dedicated to women's human rights.

In 1995 Forum-Asia undertook its first country mission. The regional mission to Burma focused on assessing the situation in the country. The delegation met with various local figures, including Aung San Suu Kyi, to determine how the network could support human rights advocacy in the country.

In 1996, Forum-Asia participated in the establishment of the Alternative ASEAN Network on Burma (ALTSEAN-Burma), a network of groups and individuals supporting human rights and democracy initiatives in Burma.

Forum-Asia frequently assisted in the incubation of new regional networks. The organization routinely co-organized initial meetings on specific human rights issues and served as a temporary secretariat for emerging groups until they established independence.

For example, the Asian Network for Free Elections (ANFREL) was established using this framework in 1997 to focus on regional election monitoring. Forum-Asia similarly participated in the non-governmental organisations (NGO) Coalition for the International Criminal Court (CICC) in 2001.

With time, the particular organisational priorities of Forum-Asia changed. In a report from 1999 the network describes itself by stating that '... It strives to promote, on the basis of global perspective, a regional initiative towards the protection of human rights, development and peace in the region through collaboration of human rights and development NGOs and people's organizations in Asia.'

Testimony to this growing focus on global advocacy, was the granting of consultative status to Forum-Asia in 2004 to the United Nations Economic and Social Council (ECOSOC status) after a two-year application process. ECOSOC status provided Forum-Asia with access to ECOSOC, its many subsidiary bodies, the various human rights mechanisms of the United Nations (UN), ad-hoc processes on small arms, and special events organised by the President of the General Assembly. To be able to obtain ECOSOC status, the Forum-Asia Foundation was officially registered in 2000.

Reflections from 2002 highlight 'the emergence of Forum-Asia [as] a regional entity recognized by governments, intergovernmental organizations and civil society groups in the region and elsewhere. It has emerged as a major partner in most leading human rights activities.' However, at the same time it was also said that 'We are still faced with the challenge of linking human rights activism from local, national, regional and global level. ... we have to acknowledge that not all members are equally engaged in all the campaigns and activities conducted by Forum-Asia.'

While by no means unique to a network organisation, Forum-Asia decided to address these issues and those raised in a previous evaluation. In 2003 it established a project on 'Transforming the Secretariat'. An external consultant, Deep Rai, was tasked to address the challenges and needs identified by staff and the executive committee.

=== Independence (2005–2013) ===
Initiated by the aforementioned evaluation and the project, 'Transforming the Secretariat', a process was set in motion to change Forum-Asia. At the GA of 2004 it was decided that a new function would be established, being that of an executive director. In January 2005, Anselmo Lee was the first to take this position. The position of executive director of Forum-Asia would later be held by Yap Swee Seng, Giyoun Kim (Acting), and Evelyn Balais-Serrano.

The restructuring process led to the network establishing an independent office separate from its original host organization, accompanied by a stylistic change in its name to FORUM-ASIA.

The changes prompted FORUM-ASIA to re-evaluate its strategies and programmes. By 2005 the network consisted of 36 members in 14 countries. The refocusing of its strategic priorities led to a stronger focus on international advocacy and coalition building.

A highlight of which was the establishment of the Geneva Office in 2006. The objective of the Geneva Office was and continues to be two-fold. First is to increase the impact and effectiveness of FORUM-ASIA and its members' advocacy in UN fora. Second is to encourage accountability of Asian member states to UN Human Rights Mechanisms.

In 2010 the Geneva example paved the way for the establishment of an office in Jakarta. The objective was and still is to monitor, engage with and inform FORUM-ASIA members about the developments of ASEAN, in particularly those related to the ASEAN Intergovernmental Commission on Human Rights (AICHR) and the ASEAN Commission on the Promotion and Protection of the Rights of Women and Children (ACWC). The office is hosted by the Komisi untuk Orang Hilang dan Korban Tindak Kekerasan (KontraS or Commission for the Disappeared and Victims of Violence), a prominent member organisation of FORUM-ASIA in Indonesia.

In 2006, FORUM-ASIA was involved in two notable other initiatives. The establishment of the Solidarity for Asian People's Advocacy (SAPA) – a network focussed on cross-sectoral partnerships build around shared advocacy targets – and the creation of the Asian NGO Network on National Human Rights Institutions (ANNI).

An external evaluation from 2007 concluded that '... the principal added value [of FORUM-ASIA] is a) protection ... b) facilitating regional and international human rights advocacy, and c) providing a platform for learning and collective action ... .' This observation indicated another shift in FORUM-ASIA's efforts away from the focus on capacity building from the initial years of FORUM- ASIA.

Furthering the tradition of involvement in the birth of new networks and coalitions, FORUM-ASIA was part of the establishment of the Asia Pacific Refugees Rights Network (APRRN) in 2008. FORUM-ASIA hosted APRRNs first coordinator after his appointment in 2010, and hosted the network during its formative years to allow it to grow. APRRN became independent in 2012.

One of FORUM-ASIA's latest initiatives, in this tradition, was the Regional Initiative for a South Asia Human Right Mechanism (RISAHRM). RISAHRM's aim is to establish a South Asian human rights mechanism that brings together national processes and regional aspirations.

=== 2013–2016 ===
In 2013 a new management team was appointed, led by Evelyn Balais-Serrano as executive director, to guide FORUM-ASIA into a new period. With the 25 year anniversary in 2016 coming up the network and organisation once again needed to reflect and re-evaluate the role, the added value and the priorities of the movement.

In recognition of the desire of many to make capacity building and training once again a central component of FORUM-ASIA's work, in 2013 it initiated the Glo-cal Advocacy Leadership in Asia Academy (GALA Academy) together with the Asian Development Alliance (ADA) and the Asian Democracy Network (ADN). The aim of the GALA Academy is to strengthen the international advocacy capacity of mid- and high-level staff in civil society organisations (CSOs).

Realising the need to enhance FORUM-ASIA's advocacy efforts in South Asia, the Kathmandu office, in Nepal was established in 2015. Hosted by founding member, INSEC, the Kathmandu office provides a permanent presence to strengthen and consolidate the human rights movement through effective collaboration with member and partner organisations in South Asia.

== Member organizations ==
Afghanistan

- One organisation name withheld for security reasons
- SRMO – Safety and Risk Mitigation Organization

Bangladesh

- ASK – Ain O Salish Kendra (Law and Mediation Center)
- MLAA – Madaripur Legal Aid Association
- Odhikar
- RIC – Resource Integration Center
- RMMRU – Refugee and Migratory Movements Research Unit

Burma

- Equality Myanmar
- WLB – Women's League of Burma
- Progressive Voice

Cambodia

- ADHOC – Cambodian Human Rights and Development Association
- LICADHO – Cambodia League for the Promotion and Defense of Human Rights
- WIC – Worker's Information Cente

India

- SICHREM – South India Cell for Human Rights Education and Monitoring
- PW – People's Watch
- Dalit Foundation
- HRA – Human Rights Alert
- APDP – Association of Parents of Disappeared Persons
- CSNR – Centre for the Sustainable Use of Natural and Social Resources
- CCDS – Centre for Communication and Development Studies
- Quill Foundation
- READ – Rights Education And Development Centre
- Jananeethi

Indonesia

- AJI – The Alliance of Independent Journalists Indonesia
- HRWG – Indonesia's NGO Coalition for International Human Rights Advocacy – Human Rights Working Group
- IMPARSIAL – Inisiatif Masyarakat Partisipatif untuk Transisi Berkeadilan
- KontraS – The Federation of Commission for the Disappeared and Victims of Violence
- PBHI – Indonesian Legal Aid and Human Rights Association
- SAMIN – Yayasan Sekretariat Anak Merdeka Indonesia
- YLBHI – Indonesia Legal Aid Foundation

Japan

- Human Rights Now

Kazakhstan

- KIBHR – Kazakhstan International Bureau for Human Rights and Rule of Law
- KK – Dignity-Kadyr-kassiyet
- ILI – International Legal Initiative Public Foundation

Kyrgyzstan

- Bir Duino

Malaysia

- ERA Consumers – Education and Research Association for Consumers
- SUARAM – Suara Rakyat Malaysia
- KOMAS – Pusat Komunikasi Masyarakat

Maldives

- MDN – Maldivian Democracy Network

Mongolia

- CHRD – Center for Human Rights and Development
- GI – Globe International
- NCAV – National Center Against Violence
- PSR – Psychological Responsiveness NGO
- MONFEMNET National Network r

Nepal

- INSEC – Informal Sector Service Centre
- CSRC – Community Self Reliance Centre
- KIRDARC – Karnali Integrated Rural Development and Research Centre
- WOREC – Women's Rehabilitation Centre
- YoAC – Youth Action Nepal
- National Alliance for Human rights and Social Justice
- JCYCN – Jagriti Child and Youth Concern Nepal

New Zealand

- Human Rights Measurement Initiative

Pakistan

- B4A – Bytes for All (ICTs for development, democracy and social justice)
- NCJP – National Commission for Justice and Peace
- PODA – Potahar Organization for Development Advocacy
- SPARC – Society for the Protection of the Rights of the Child
- AWAZCDS – AWAZ Foundation Pakistan: Centre for Development Services
- AWAM – Association of Women for Awareness & Motivation
- The Awakening - A Society for Social & Cultural Development
- Defence of Human Rights

Philippines

- PAHRA – Philippine Alliance of Human Rights Advocates
- TFDP – Task Force Detainees of the Philippines
- TK – Tanggol-Kalikasan – Public Interest Environmental Law Office
- BALAOD Mindanaw – Balay Alternative Legal Advocates for Development in Mindanaw
- DAKILA – Philippine Collective for Modern Heroism
- KARAPATAN – Karapatan Alliance Philippines
- LILAK – Purple Action for Indigenous Women's Rights

Singapore

- Think Centre

South Korea

- KHIS – Korean House for International Solidarity
- PSPD – People's Solidarity for Participatory Democracy

Sri Lanka

- INFORM – Human Rights Documentation Centre
- LST – Law and Society Trust
- R2L – Rights to Life Human Rights Centre
- RN – Rights Now Collective for Democracy

Taiwan

- TAHR – Taiwan Association for Human Rights
- CW – Covenants Watch

Thailand

- PEF – People's Empowerment Foundation
- AWARD – Association for Human Rights and Women's Rights in Development
- CRC – Community Resource Centre

Timor Leste

- HAK Association – Perkumpulan Hukum, Hak Asasi dan Keadilan (Law, Basic Rights, and Justice Foundation)
- JSMP – Judicial System Monitoring Programme

Vietnam

- VNWHR – Vietnamese Women for Human Rights

== See also ==
- Human rights in Asia
- Human security
- List of human rights organisations
