= Philippine Alliance of Human Rights Advocates =

Human rights organization

The Philippine Alliance of Human Rights Advocates (PAHRA) is a non-profit, national human rights organization in the Philippines, Manila. PAHRA is an alliance of individuals, institutions and organizations committed to the promotion, protection and realization of human rights on the national and international level. The organization's task is to promote and defend human rights, prevent Human Rights violations and abuses by. Its main work is to build up a network on progressive human rights organization on national level as well as in the international level. The organization primarily campaigns for civil and political rights; economic, social and cultural rights; human rights defenders.

It was founded in 1986 as a result of the President Ferdinand Marcos' administration under martial law. Task Force Detainees of the Philippines and other human rights organizations established PAHRA.

== Membership ==
- International Federation for Human Rights (FIDH)
- Asian Forum for Human Rights and Development (FORUM-ASIA)
- Asian Network for Free Elections (ANFREL)
