= THRD Alliance =

Terai Human Rights Defenders Alliance "THRD Alliance"
- Founded: 2011; 15 years ago
- Founder: Dipendra Jha
- Type: Non-profit; NGO
- Headquarters: Jaleshwor, Nepal
- Location: Nepal
- Services: Promoting and protecting human rights
- Fields: Human Rights Monitoring, Documentation, Litigation, Research, and Lobby and Advocacy
- Website: www.thrda.org

Terai Human Rights Defenders Alliance (commonly known as THRD Alliance or THRDA) is a non-governmental human rights organization working for promotion and protection of human rights and human rights defenders in Nepal, with special focus in Terai region. It monitors, investigates, documents and researches on torture, extrajudicial execution, arbitrary arrest and detention, citizenship, inclusion and caste-based discrimination among other human rights issues in the Terai.

== Major works ==
=== Human Rights Situation Update/Analysis ===
THRD Alliance prepares the updates and analysis on human rights situation in Nepal, especially in Terai region. In 2015 and 2016, the organization extensively monitored, investigated and documented the constitution related protests in Nepal. The Kathmandu Post cites in THRD Alliance in this news story: "National rights organisations, except Tarai Human Rights Defenders Alliance (THRD Alliance), have not report on protests in the southern plains of the country."

Human rights issues identified by THRD Alliance include:

1. Resistance Continues over Nepal Constitution
2. Nepal: Flood menace in Nepal's Terai
3. Nepal Govt. ensures relief and recovery aid to flood-hit tenant farmers through petition launched by THRD Alliancel
4. Monitoring Excessive use of Force by the State in Nepal
5. Nepal Government needs to ensure fair trial in Mahottari

=== Special Report: Nepal Protest and Repression ===
THRD Alliance and Asian Human Rights Commission investigated the protests and deaths in Tikapur (Kailali), Birgunj (Parsa), Janakpur (Dhanusha), Jaleshwar (Mahottari), Rajbiraj, Bhardaha (Saptari) and Rangeli and Dainiya (Morang) districts. While not investigating the two incidents in Tikapur (Kailali) and Bhagawanpur (Mahottari) in which protestors were responsible for the killing of eight police and one APF officer, the AHRC and THRD Alliance condemn these killings in the strongest terms. Based on the findings of their investigation, the rights organizations demanded an independent investigations, prosecutions, and reparation in the cases by both side and measures as required by law. The report has been submitted to United Nations Human Rights Council.

=== Nepal Universal Periodic Report Submission and Update ===
THRD Alliance in collaboration with other human rights organizations led by TRIAL submitted the report to the United Nations Universal Periodic Review on Nepal in 2015. In April 2013, It has also collaborated with TRIAL to issue written information for the adoption of the List of Issues by the Human Rights Committee with regard to Nepal's Second Periodic Report.
