= The Advocacy Project =

Nonprofit organization

The Advocacy project
- Founded: 2001
- Founder: Iain Guest
- Type: Non-profit; NGO
- Location: Washington, D.C., United States
- Website: advocacynet.org

The Advocacy Project (AP) is a non-profit organization that seeks to strengthen community-based human rights advocacy groups. The project was established in June 1998 to report to human rights advocates from the Rome conference that established the International Criminal Court. The Advocacy Project continued on a project-by-project basis until it acquired nonprofit status in July 2001. As of 2017, The Advocacy Project has deployed 294 Peace Fellows to 114 organisations in over 50 countries.

== Organization ==
=== Mission ===
According to its website, The Advocacy Project helps marginalized communities to tell their stories, claim their rights, and produce social change. The organization is based in Washington, D.C., and sends peace fellows, who are usually graduate students, to assist their partners across the world. They focus on sending representatives to organizations that are from the local areas instead of imposing a solution from the outside.

=== Services ===
The Advocacy Project sends a number of graduate students to partner organizations in other countries that are based from the local populations. The students, called Peace Fellows by the project, write blogs which chronicle their journeys as they spend time assisting local non-governmental organizations (NGOs). Wired noted that the blogs functioned as effective journals of the trips from fellows, which served to highlight the differences in culture between the first and third worlds.

The Advocacy Project provides support through services including:

- Telling Their Story
- Designing a Program or Campaign
- Strengthening the Partner's Organization
- Use IT and Social Media Platforms
- Fundraising
- International Promotion

One of the main ways the Advocacy Project performs outreach is through quilts. Through quilting projects, The Advocacy Project hopes that it will help people that are marginalized tell their story through pictures. Often these quilts showcase the daily lives of people in marginalized communities. The Baltimore Sun and St. Louis Post-Dispatch both favorably reported on the project's work with Bosfam, an NGO that helps Bosnian women who were affected by the 1992-95 Bosnian war, for helping to raise money through the weaving work that the organization's women performed. A number of quilts that were made with the help of The Advocacy Project were also showcased at the United Nations in honor of International Women's Day by an event put on by the United Nations Population Fund.
