= Point of Peace Foundation =

Norwegian-based foundation

Point of Peace Foundation is an independent human rights organization based in Stavanger, Norway. The organization is responsible for several events in 2008 as Stavanger is European Capital of Culture.

The organization aims to establish an international arena for dialogue and Conflict management in Stavanger. Point of Peace Foundation has a special mandate to support Nobel Peace Prize Laureates in urgent need of media, dialogue and communication assistance in their own country and internationally.

The organization has in project the web-based "Peace Channel" in cooperation with Bob Geldof, and his London based company Ten Alps, aimed to be launched in September 2008.
