= International Peace Observers Network =

Human Rights organisation based in Germany

The International Peace Observers Network (IPON) is an independent, non-violent human rights, non-profit organization based in Hamburg, Germany. It monitors the human rights situation in the Philippines and works to protect human rights defenders. IPON aims to create an environment where human rights are respected and human rights groups are able to undertake their work in a secure environment free from threats, violence, and repression.

Upon request, international volunteers, who work as peaceworkers, accompany groups of human rights defenders (HRD) in the Philippines, currently in the islands of Luzon, Negros, and Mindanao. Information gathered in conflict areas is analyzed by observers and brought to the attention of the international public. "This way the international pressure on the Philippines to guarantee human rights rises. The publication of human rights violations will finally lead to their decrease and prevention."

The work of IPON started in 2006.

== See also ==
- Third Party Non-violent Intervention
- Human rights in the Philippines
