= Icelandic Human Rights Centre =

The Icelandic Human Rights Centre was established in 1994 by nine different organizations and actors working in Icelandic human rights field. Centres mission is to promote and raise awareness about human rights in Iceland and abroad, and spread its knowledge to the public.

== Action and work ==
The Centre provides human rights education and arranges seminars and conferences about human rights. On the other hand, it's monitoring the human rights situation in Iceland and provides information to the international actors about this matter. The Icelandic Human Rights Centre also provides legal research on human rights issues and holds the only human rights -specialized library in Iceland.

The centre is currently involving in two projects (the situation on March 9, 2014), European-wide Action Week against Racism, which is going to take place on March 21 and the Human Rights Education Project, which Icelandic Human Rights Centre has taken part since August 2004.

== Partnerships ==
There are currently fourteen partners of Icelandic Human Rights Centre: Amnesty International Iceland, Barnheill - Save the Children Iceland, Evangelical Lutheran Church of Iceland, Hjálparstarf kirkjunnar, Church Aid, The Centre for Gender Equality, The Icelandic Women's Rights Association, National Association of Persons with Intellectual Disabilities, Icelandic Red Cross, Reykjavík University, Association '78 – national LGBT organisation, Siðmennt – Association of Ethical Humanists of Iceland, University of Akureyri, UNIFEM – Icelandic National Committee and The Organization of the Disabled in Iceland. The current chairman is Kitty Anderson.

=== International ===
The Icelandic Human Rights Centre has four sister-organizations, which are Danish Center for Human Rights, the Norwegian Institute for Human Rights, the Raoul Wallenberg Institute of Human Rights and Humanitarian Law in Lund, Sweden and the Abo Akademi University Institute for Human Rights in Finland. It is also a member of Association of Human Rights Institutes (AHRI) and UNITED -network.
