= Chad Booc =

Filipino teacher and activist (1994–2022)

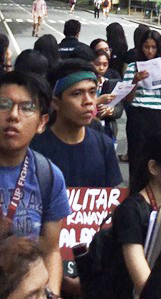
- Booc during a protest in 2019
- Born: Chad Errol Ramirez Booc; April 17, 1994; Cebu City, Philippines
- Died: February 24, 2022 (aged 27); New Bataan, Davao de Oro, Philippines
- Education: University of the Philippines Diliman (BS)
- Years active: 2014–2022

Chad Errol Ramirez Booc (April 17, 1994 – February 24, 2022) was a Filipino volunteer Lumad teacher and activist. He was known for his vocal stance on several issues both on-ground and in social media.

According to the Armed Forces of the Philippines (AFP), he was one of the five people killed in an alleged encounter between the New People's Army and the AFP on February 24, 2022, a claim that has since been disputed by advocates, loved ones, and a forensic pathologist. The incident was later known as the New Bataan massacre, with the victims being dubbed as the "New Bataan 5".

== Background ==
Booc was born on April 17, 1994 in Cebu City, Philippines, although he was later raised in neighboring Mandaue City, which he considered as his hometown; both cities are located within Metro Cebu.

He studied in Pagsabungan National High School in Mandaue where he was awarded by the local government as one of the twenty outstanding students of the city. He was a consistent honor student from elementary to high school.

He graduated with a cum laude degree in Computer Science at the University of the Philippines Diliman in 2016. His undergraduate thesis created a mental health first aid mobile application, partnering with University of the Philippines Manila. He was also involved in improving a Manobo dictionary mobile application by Ricardo de Leon.

== Activism ==
He participated in the Manilakbayan in 2015 on the eve of the killing of the executive director of Alternative Learning Center for Agricultural and Livelihood Development (ALCADEV), an alternative Lumad school established in 2004, serving Lumad children from Manobo, Higaonon, Banwaon, Talandig, and Mamanwa in Surigao del Sur. He said that he “witnessed how the Lumad stood up as a tribe for self-governance and self-determination. The fact that they built and ran their own school without our help, even if we are deemed more educated because we finished college”. He made his decision to become a Lumad teacher and arduously convinced his family of his planned undertaking.

Booc started to become a mathematics volunteer teacher for the Lumad in 2016, particularly in ALCADEV. His volunteer work has made him and his students paralegals, human rights workers, and social media handlers for ALCADEV students and other Lumad. He got involved in organizing numerous Lakbayan and in bakwit (evacuee) Lumad schools, championing their right for education and self-determination. He experienced forced evacuations of communities and death threats. He has used social media in trying to reach wider audiences, with thousands of followers on Twitter. He also became vocal on the experiences of urban poor communities in his hometown.

He was arrested twice, first in Batasang Pambansa on July 17, 2017, along with seven other youths and Lumad teachers. In protest against Martial Law in Mindanao under President Rodrigo Duterte, they interrupted the special joint session of the House of Representatives to vote whether or not the island-wide martial law should be extended. They were freed on July 25 and had their cases dismissed on October 2 of the same year. They continued to speak up against rampant militarization of the AFP against Lumad communities especially under martial law.

Booc is among those who filed petitions with the Philippine Supreme Court challenging the constitutionality of the Anti-Terrorism Act.

=== Raid at the University of San Carlos—'Bakwit School 7' ===
On February 15, 2021, a police raid was conducted against a Lumad sanctuary in the Talamban campus of the University of San Carlos where he was arrested, without warrant, along with others. The combined police and military forces said that they "rescued" nineteen Lumad youths, saying that the Lumads were being trained as armed combatants. The youths were flown to Davao de Oro where they evacuated in the first place because of state militarization. The USC itself through the Societas Verbas Divini (SVD) Philippines Southern Province and the Archdiocese of Cebu-Commission on Social Advocacies said that they were helping the bakwit school and they were there because they were stuck because of quarantine restrictions.

They were charged with kidnapping, serious illegal detention, child abuse, and human trafficking. Those arrested included co-teacher Roshelle Mae C. Porcadilla, Lumad datus Segundo Lagatos Melong, Benito Dalim Bay-ao, and students Moddie Langayed Mansimoy-at, Esmelito Paumba Oribawan, and Jomar Benag. They were collectively called 'Bakwit School 7'.

A "Free Chad Booc Network" was launched. On March 17, University of the Philippines College of Engineering condemned the red-tagging sentiment of the National Task Force to End Local Communist Armed Conflict (NTF-ELCAC), particularly by its spokesperson and Undersecretary Lorraine Badoy-Partosa. Numerous student councils and organizations from UP Diliman demanded the freedom of Booc and his companions. Many other personalities, including Kabataan Partylist representative Sarah Elago called for Booc's release and condemned the actions by state forces.

On March 20, the detainees became more concerned for their health condition for Lumad student Esmelito “Bugoy” Oribawa cannot stand up and talk and was coughing blood. The detainees claimed that he was not allowed to see a doctor.

They have been detained for about three months at the Police Regional Office (PRO) Region 7 until on May 14, Booc and six others who were arrested had their cases dismissed by the Davao del Norte provincial prosecutor and they were set free. The prosecutor said that cases lacked evidence, probable cause, and were outside its territorial jurisdiction. The National Union of People’s Lawyers-Cebu, lawyers who handled them said that the dismissal of the cases “validates our firm assertion that the persistent red-tagging efforts on Lumad schools by the state forces are baseless and unfounded.”

Booc's counsel, Attorney Antonio La Viña, said that after their release, Lumad teachers like Booc intended to return to Mindanao to continue to teach to Lumads. They said that they feared that they may get arrested in the future.

=== Other advocacies ===
The NTF-ELCAC among others continued to red-tag Booc because of his advocacies and involvement with Lumad schools. He continuously denied accusations against him, including an instance where tarpaulins described Booc, Bayan Muna Representative Eufemia Cullamat, Dr. Naty Campos, and other Lumad and advocates as 'bloodthirsty NPA terrorists'.

Booc also supported LGBT rights and student welfare advocacies.

== New Bataan massacre ==
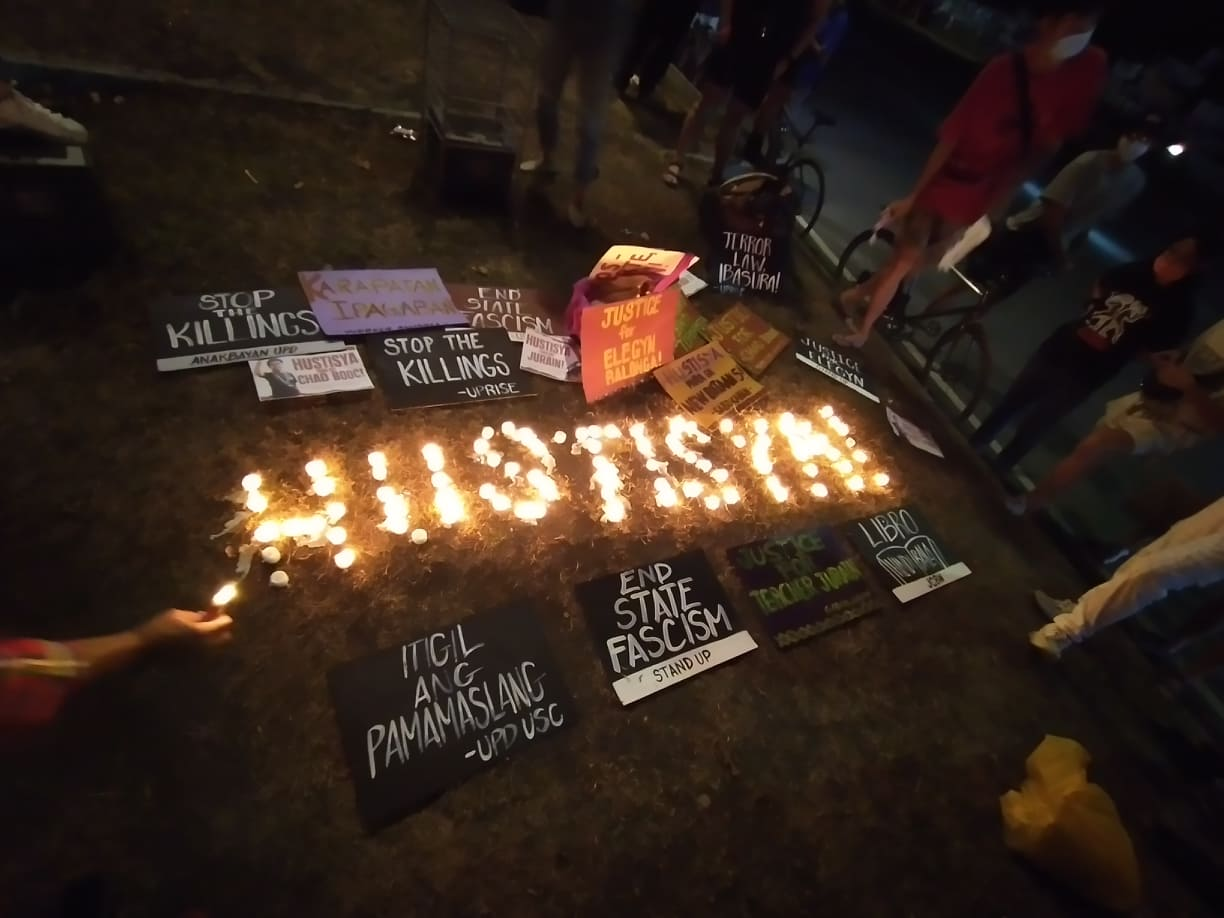
Candle-lighting protest condemning the New Bataan massacre, March 6.

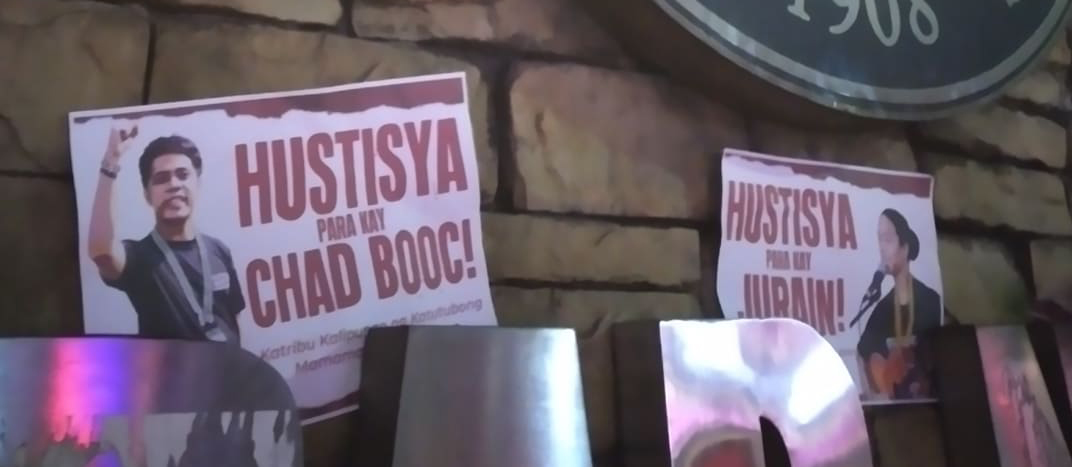
Booc in a placard (left) demanding justice for him and all the victims of the New Bataan massacre.

On February 24, 2022, Booc, along with Gelejurain "Jurain" Ngujo II, Elegyn Balonga, Tirso Añar, and Robert Aragon—collectively termed as 'New Bataan 5' were killed in New Bataan, Davao de Oro. Family members, advocacy groups, activists, and politicians have described the event as a massacre, while the Armed Forces of the Philippines asserted that what happened was an encounter between the forces of New People's Army and 10th Infantry Division of the AFP. The Communist Party of the Philippines (CPP) said that there were no NPA units in the area during the time of the event. Guns were supposedly found at the site of the encounter, although rights groups such as Save Our Schools said that the guns were planted in order to orchestrate an encounter and make them look like they were NPA. They also condemned how pictures of the slain bodies of the victims were being 'paraded' by the AFP and other agents as 'trophies'.

=== Autopsy and burial ===
An autopsy was done to the body of Booc by forensic pathologist Dr. Raquel B. Del Rosario-Fortun on March 7, 2022. The results were released by March 10. According to the preliminary findings, the manner of death was homicide and Booc suffered from "internal hemorrhages with lacerations of the lungs, diaphragm, liver, spleen, stomach, intestines, right kidney and right adrenal gland"; he was alive when he was shot. He also had his spinal cord cut. Fortun said that "there was an intent to kill. They sustained multiple gunshot wounds and on top of that, it looks like many things are being concealed." She added that the 'New Bataan 5' were not really combatants, contrary to the claim of the AFP.

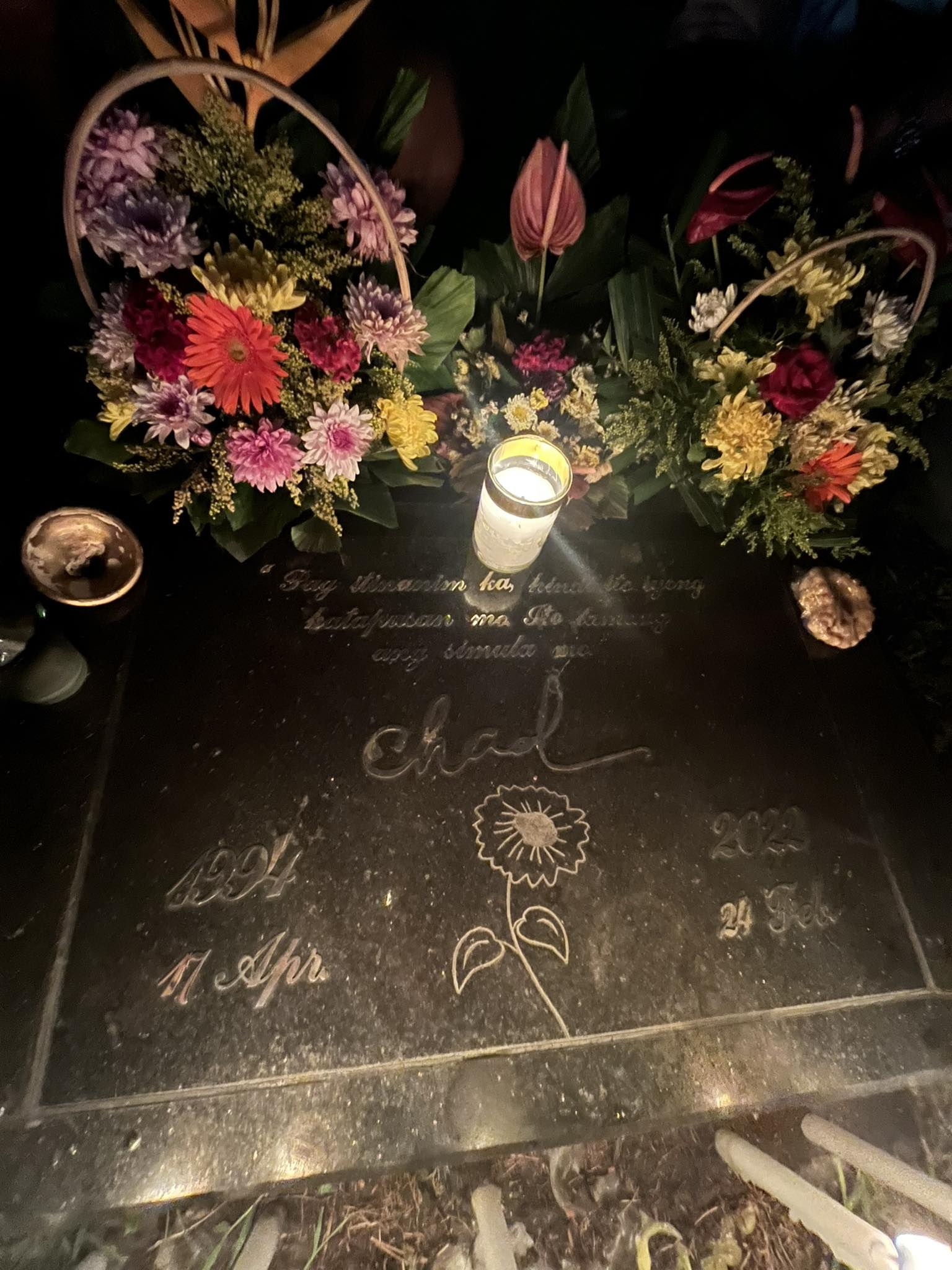
Tombstone of Chad Booc.

Describing what happened to the New Bataan 5 as "overkill", Lumad advocacy group Save Our Schools Network called on the Commission on Human Rights and other national and international independent bodies to "conduct a swift, impartial and thorough investigation of the New Bataan 5 massacre."

Booc was laid to rest on March 9, 2022, in a cemetery in Cebu City. His sister Nikki, said that the burial as "planting" her brother, continuing what he stood for. Being "planted" was supposedly the wish of Booc for his burial, according to social media post in 2019. A protest condemning the AFP was also held on that day.

=== Aftermath ===
Senator Leila de Lima called for further independent investigation on the matter.

Even after his death, Booc has been continuously red-tagged by military and other state agents. In March 2022, he was red-tagged and falsely-accused by the Philippine Army 3rd Infantry Division that he was a recruiter for the New People's Army. NTF-ELCAC spokesperson Lorraine Badoy branded Booc and his organizations as terrorist. State agents have also claimed Booc as an NPA ever since high school.

== Legacy ==
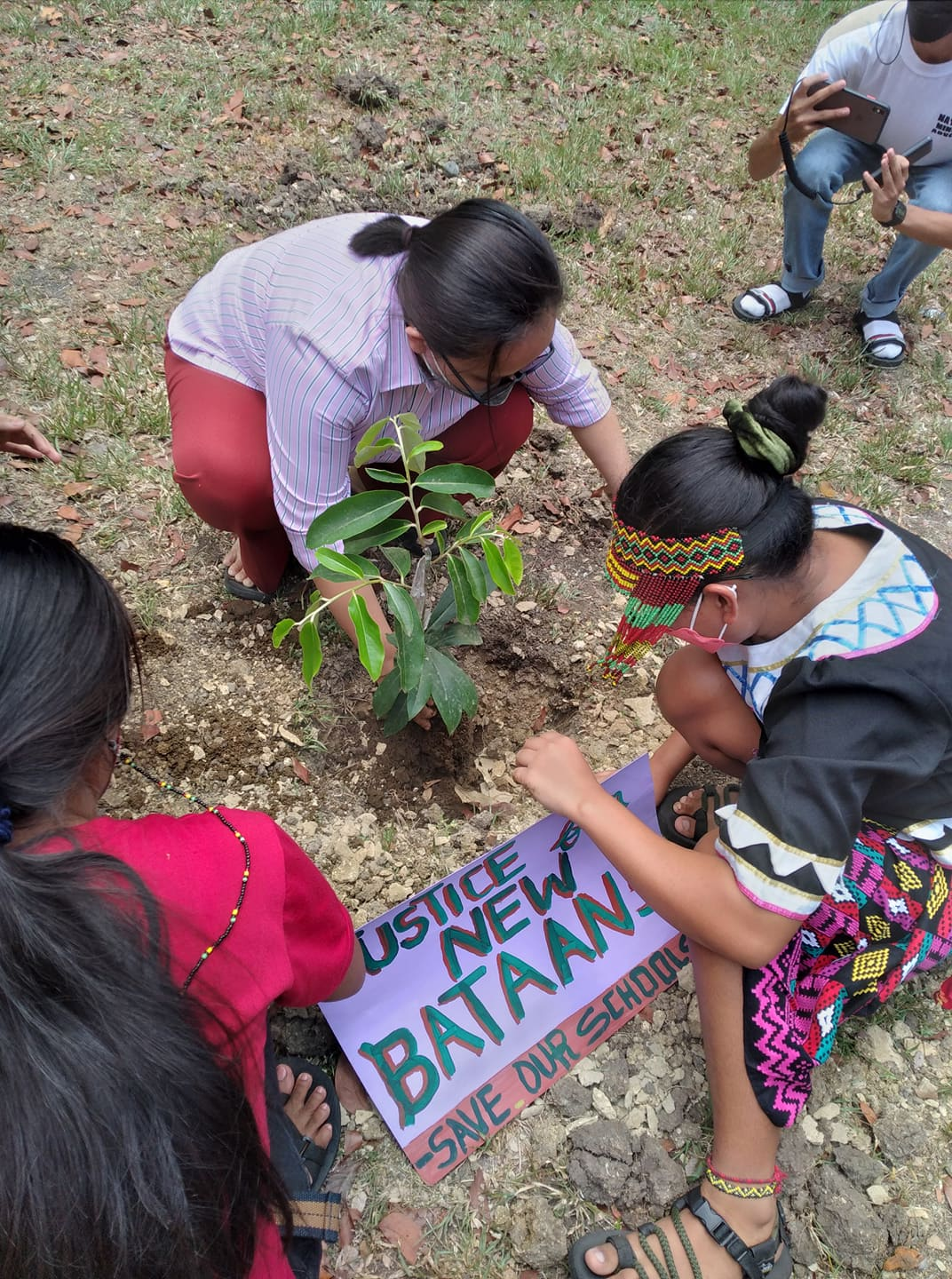
Tree planting commemoration for New Bataan massacre victims, April 6, 2022.

Vice presidential aspirant Senator Kiko Pangilingan said that impunity in the country must stop, after reading a placard demanding justice for Chad Booc and 'New Bataan 5' in a campaign sortie in March 2022.

On April 4, 2022, commemorating forty days after the massacre, religious people, students, and other advocates conducted an ecumenical service and tree-planting ceremony in front of Melchor Hall, the engineering building in UP Diliman. A day before, youth mass organizations such as Student Christian Movement of the Philippines, Anakbayan, and League of Filipino Students launched a surprise 'lightning rally' in front of Camp Aguinaldo to condemn the AFP.

The death of Booc and his four other companions have been denounced by Greenpeace, UP Cebu University Student Council, former Bayan Muna Representative Neri Colmenares, Bagong Alyansang Makabayan, Karapatan, International Coalition for Human Rights in the Philippines, Anakbayan USA, IBON Foundation, many of whom also denounced the state of impunity and instances of red-tagging under President Duterte and NTF-ELCAC. Protests were launched by groups to condemn the massacre and the AFP. These include in UP Cebu on February 26 and in UP Diliman on March 6.

The University of the Philippines particularly its College of Engineering has described Booc as a 'hero' as they demanded an unbiased investigation on the New Bataan massacre, urging human rights and denouncing counter-insurgency.

Booc encouraged other youth to integrate in marginalized communities and volunteer with them.

Booc was posthumously honored as the Most Distinguished Awardee at the 7th Gawad Bayani ng Kalikasan, held by the Center for Environmental Concerns in December 2022.
