= Red-tagging in the Philippines =

In the Philippines, red-tagging is the labeling of individuals or organizations as communists, subversives, or terrorists, regardless of their actual political beliefs or affiliations. It is considered a form of harassment and has had harmful effects on its targets. Red-tagging has been practiced by security forces, government officials, and shills.

The practice is a legacy of the Cold War and has a long history in the former American colony. Advocacy groups and organizations, including the United Nations, Amnesty International, and Human Rights Watch, have warned that its use as a political tactic undermines democracy in the Philippines by suppressing dissent, creating a chilling effect on public discourse, and encouraging assassinations and retaliations.

== Definitions ==
Commonly defined as the harassment or persecution of a person because of "known or suspected communist sympathies," the extensive history of red-tagging in the Philippines has led to the recognition of several formal definitions by the Philippine government.

The Commission on Human Rights follows the definition laid down by the International Peace Observers Network (IPON), which defines it as:

An act of State actors, particularly law enforcement agencies, to publicly brand individuals, groups, or institutions as… affiliated to communist or leftist terrorists.

Additionally, the term has been defined in Philippine jurisprudence through the dissenting opinion of Supreme Court Associate Justice Marvic Leonen in the 2015 court case Zarate vs. Aquino III (G.R. No. 220028 J. Leonen Dissenting Opinion, November 10, 2015), in which Leonen adopted a 2011 journals' definition of red-tagging:

the act of labelling, branding, naming and accusing individuals and/ or organizations of being left-leaning, subversives, communists or terrorists (used as) a strategy… by State agents, particularly law enforcement agencies and the military, against those perceived to be 'threats' or 'enemies of the State.'

The Supreme Court declared in May 2024 that red-tagging is a threat to the right to a person's life and security.

== Effects ==
=== Human rights violations ===
Red-tagging impinges on the right to free expression and dissent according to media and rights groups. The Philippine Commission on Human Rights (CHR) also noted that red-tagging threatens the lives or safety of individuals. The act of red-tagging human-rights defenders constitutes a grave threat to their lives, liberty, and security. It creates a distortion to the nature of their work and makes them susceptible to attacks and a number of violations as emphasized by the CHR. The killing of four activists in June 2015 in Sorsogon City may have been the result of the activists's membership in groups that were red-tagged by the Philippine government, according to Amnesty International. Security forces have raided the offices of these red-tagged organizations and arrested members of these organizations. The raids have been described as a crackdown on dissent.

The Philippine independent news organization Vera Files notes that since President Rodrigo Duterte declared the Communist Party of the Philippines and the New People's Army terrorist organizations under the Human Security Act of 2007, individuals and organizations who have been red-tagged are vulnerable to interception and recording of communication, detention without charges, restricted travel and personal liberties, examination of bank records, and the seizure and sequestration of their assets. Reporters Without Borders notes that red-tagged individuals are vulnerable to death threats and violence. In some instances, targets of red-tagging are also harassed by accusations of terrorism.

According to CHR Spokesperson Jacqueline de Guia, this kind of labeling may have serious consequences on the security of the groups or individuals that are being tagged. Additionally, Karapatan states that this jeopardizes the initiatives of human rights organizations and defenders to inform the public about the violation of rights in the Philippines.

Karapatan Deputy Secretary General Roneo Clamor said that human rights defenders who are red-tagged are not only illegally arrested, some are also killed. According to him, the National Task Force (NTF) was made to hinder the human rights defenders to get justice for the victims. UN special rapporteur Irene Khan also reported that red tagging is often followed by arrests and detention on fabricated charges.

=== Extrajudicial killings ===
The CHR stated that red-tagging needs to be seen in the context of the increasing extrajudicial killings in rural Philippines and the government's counterinsurgency program. From July 2016 to November 2019, Karapatan documented 293 victims of extrajudicial killings perpetrated in line with the counterinsurgency program, with 167 human rights defenders killed or an average of one to two HRDs killed every week. At least 429 were victims of frustrated killings. They also documented at least 14 massacres and hundreds of victims of extrajudicial killings (including 28 children) under President Aquino's term.

After redtagging of various personalities by Lt. Gen. Antonio Parlade in October 2020, Senator Panfilo Lacson ordered the general summoned to senate hearing. Defense Secretary Delfin Lorenzana had also warned against making baseless accusations, indirectly referring to Parlade's statements and double-downs.

=== During elections ===
Red-tagging has been used as a "weapon" against opposition candidates during election campaigns, according to media watchdogs and members of the political opposition. Red-tagging has also been used to divert public attention from economic hardships and extrajudicial killings attributed to incumbent candidates.

During the 2022 Philippine presidential election, the red-tagging of presidential candidate Leni Robredo by incumbent officials were frequently featured on the Manila Times and the Daily Tribune, according to media observers. A report by the ASEAN Parliamentarians for Human Rights said that Robredo was the "prime target of intensified disinformation and red-tagging in social media leading up to election day." The report also said that candidates and elected representatives of the Makabayan bloc were also red-tagged. Former Congress representative and senatorial candidate Neri Colmenares said that red-tagging increased during elections and targeted opposition candidates who protested the Philippine government's poor COVID pandemic response, the Anti-Terrorism Law, and the extrajudicial killing of activists. Colmenares said that candidates of the Otso Diretso senatorial slate were also red-tagged during the 2019 election campaign, and that the red-tagging died down after the election.

In February 2025, the Philippine Commission on Elections (COMELEC) issued Resolution No. 11116, which made red-tagging and discrimination during election campaigns offenses punishable with imprisonment of one to six years and disqualification from public office. COMELEC Chair George Erwin Garcia said that the policy is based on the Supreme Court ruling that defined red-tagging as an act that threatens individuals.

In March 2025, during the campaign for the 2025 Philippine general election, Bayan Muna party-list nominee Neri Colmenares filed a complaint urging COMELEC to investigate allegations of red-tagging and vilification constituting "massive and widespread black propaganda" and the destruction of campaign materials. Vote Report PH noted reports of red-tagging, harassment, and disinformation prior to the elections, alongside vote buying and abuse of government resources in campaigns.

The International Coalition for Human Rights in the Philippines stated that red-tagging was the most common election violation as of April 30, 2025, making up 78.7% of the election violations it had recorded. "This level of systematic red-tagging is not only a violation of human rights, it's a coordinated effort to intimidate and discredit democratic actors," the group said.

== Affected groups ==
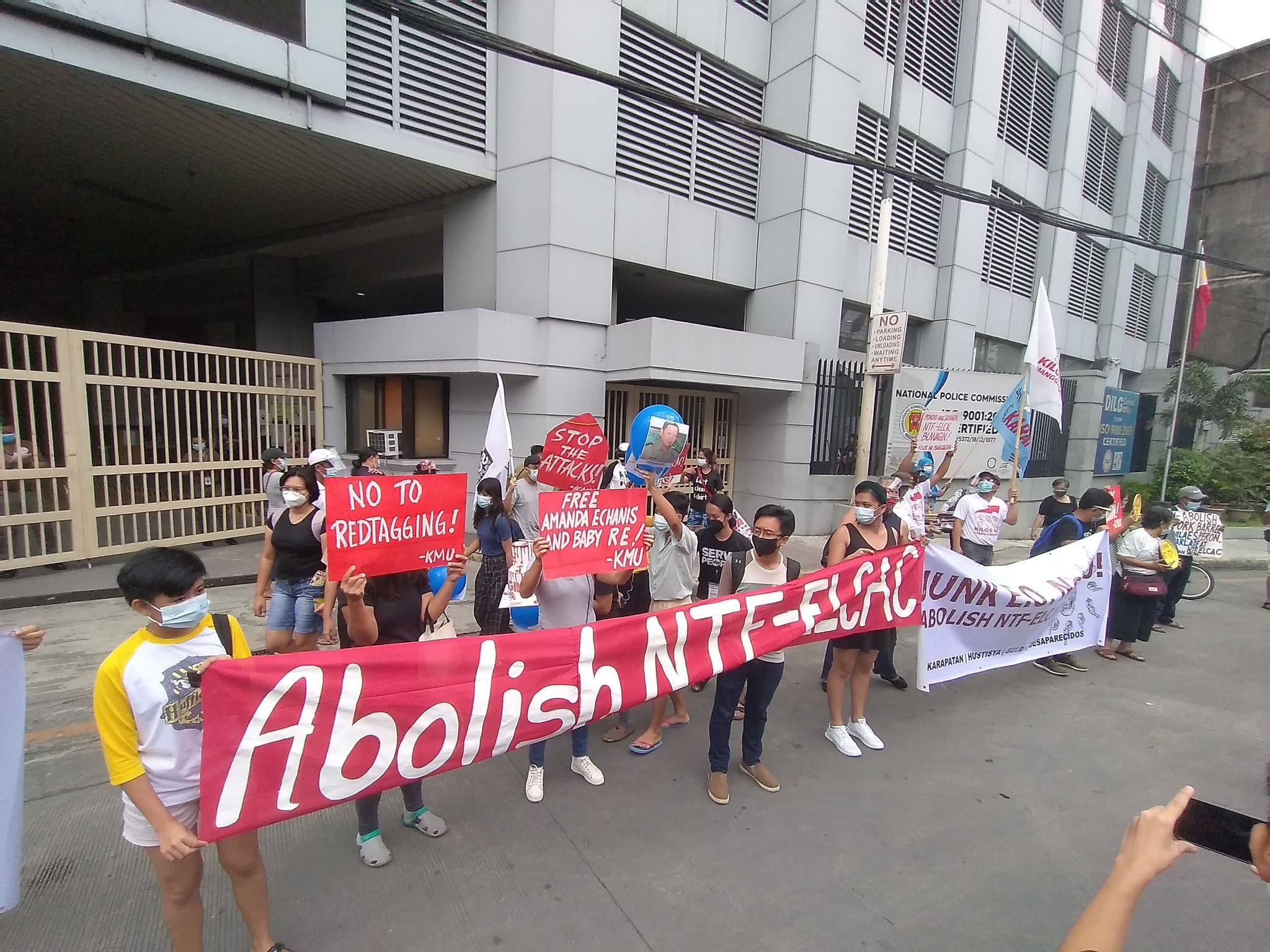
Protest in front of DILG, Quezon City against NTF-ELCAC on its second anniversary, December 4, 2020.

Organizations frequently subject to red-tagging in the Philippines include civil-rights groups, religious institutions, health worker unions, academia, and the mainstream and alternative media. Workers' and farmers' groups and land and environmental defenders are also frequently red-tagged. Some of these organizations and institutions are branded as fronts, supporters or mere sympathizers of the New People's Army.

=== Human rights organizations and advocates ===
Human rights advocates and human rights organizations in the Philippines, whether civil society, intergovernment, and even governmental in nature, have often been the subject of "defamatory and intimidating public statements" as a result of their human rights monitoring work.

==== Karapatan ====
Karapatan is one of the progressive organizations that is continuously targeted by anonymous people, military and police, and the Duterte administration. In March 2019, the group filed complaints concerning the alleged practice of branding and labeling organizations as terrorists by the Duterte administration. The attacks were in different forms, such as a direct tagging from President Duterte in his previous speech as well as tarpaulins and flyers that label them as such. Thus, in June 2019, Amnesty International called on the Philippine government to stop branding similar organizations like Karapatan as "communist fronts." According to the organization, two of its staff were gunned down by unidentified people last June 15. Similarly, on the next day, Nonoy Palma, a farmer activist, was also gunned down by an unidentified person in Naga City, Camarines Sur. Amnesty International called for the fulfillment of the protection of human rights by human rights defenders and activists. However, in December 2019, Cristina Palabay, Karapatan's Secretary General of Human Rights, received death and rape threats from anonymous texters. Another anonymous sender texted her various slurs and defended the Duterte administration. In August 2020, two Karapatan officers, as well as other activists, received death threats. This came a week after Zara Alvarez was gunned down by an unidentified man in Bacolod City on August 17.

In criminal and administrative suits filed before the Office of the Ombudsman on December 4, 2020, Karapatan asserted that red-tagging "can be considered a violation of the principle of distinction" under international humanitarian law."

==== Gabriela Women's Party ====
The feminist group Gabriela Women's Party and its supporters have also been red-tagged.

=== Ethnic-rights activists ===
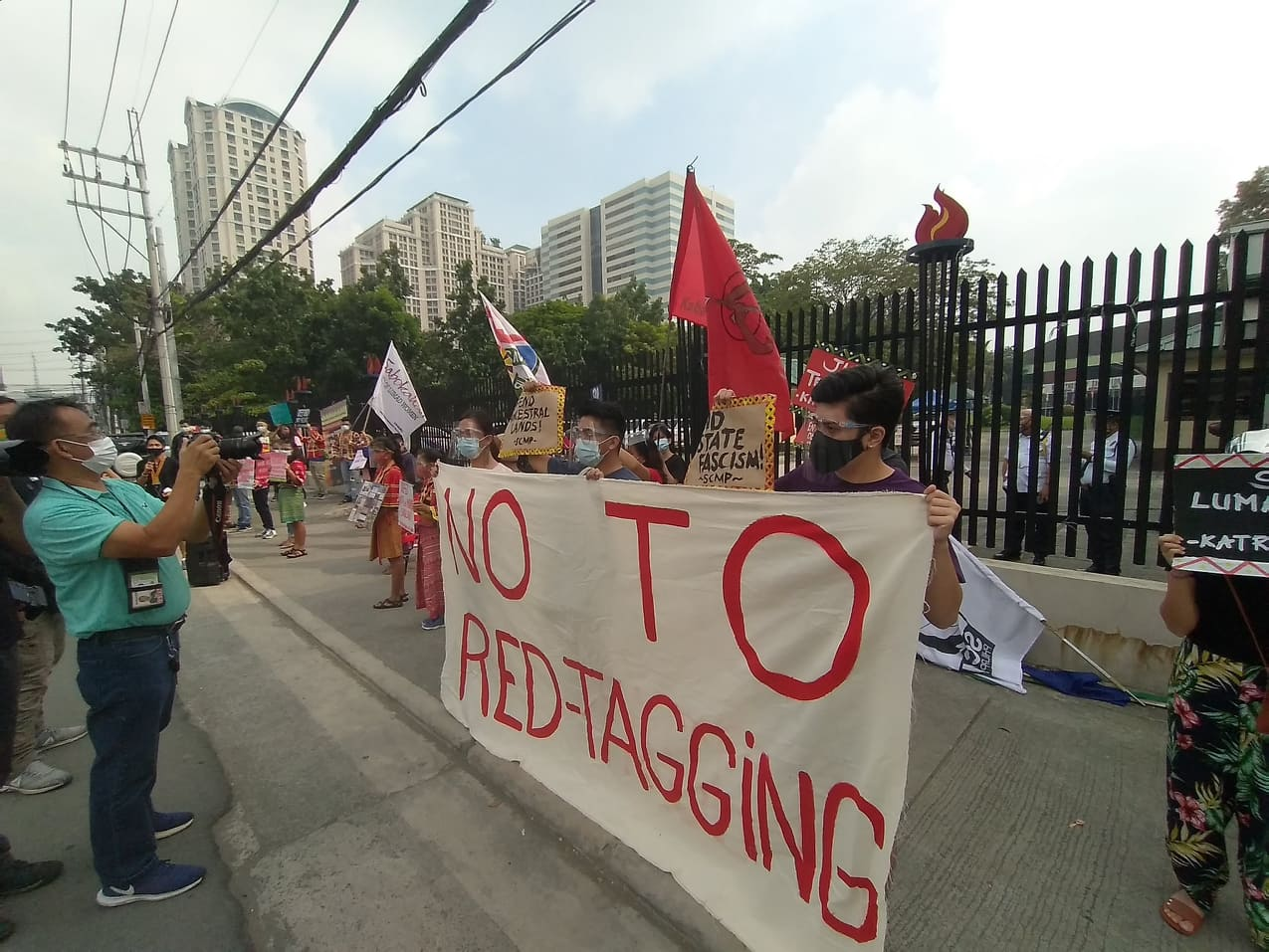
An anti-redtagging banner in a protest against the closure of Lumad schools, December 3, 2020.

In 2018 a United Nations Human Rights Council report counted "at least 80 recognized human rights defenders, indigenous peoples' representatives, and representatives of community-based organizations," which the administration of President Rodrigo Duterte had labeled as terrorists in connection with their work, some of which was part of their "cooperation with the United Nations." This included UN Special Rapporteur Victoria Tauli-Corpuz, who was falsely listed as a senior member of the NPA.

In January 2019, indigenous Lumad leaders Datu Jomorito Guaynon and Ireneo Udarbe were arrested after being accused by police and state elements of being communist rebel recruiters. Both have frequently organized protests against ancestral land encroachment and mining.

In August 2019, Brandon Lee, an American ancestral-domain paralegal and Cordillera Human Rights Alliance volunteer, was shot four times outside his home in Ifugao province, putting him in a coma. Since 2015, posters claiming Lee and other IPM members as "enemies of the state" and members of the NPA had been circulating in the province.

The Negrense ethnic group has also been subject to a disproportionate amount of red-tagging in the decades since Philippine independence, from the usual sacadas dumaans to legal professionals, celebrities and even call-center labor-rights advocates. The persistent attacks have led to the steady growth of the #DefendNegros movement among a broad section of Negrenses resident both in Negros and the diaspora.

Lumad school volunteer teacher Chad Booc has been continuously red-tagged by state forces even after he was killed during the New Bataan massacre.

=== Labor unions ===
The Commission on Human Rights stated that the administration's red-tagging has endangered the lives of a lot of members of Philippine labor unions, that "branding any group as a communist front without proper trial violates their constitutional guarantee of presumption of innocence."

In 2018, Victor Ageas, labor union leader of the Nagkahiusang Mamumuo sa Suyapa Farm (NAMAFUSA-NAFLU-KMU), who stood against the Japanese giant Sumitomo Fruit Corp. (Sumifru) in Compostela Valley province survived an assassination attempt by motorcycle-riding gunmen who ambushed him while on his way to work. Labor union leader, Melodina Gumanoy, secretary of Namafusa-Naflu-KMU, was also targeted when motorcycle-riding gunmen attempted to kill her while she was on her way for work in Packing Plant 250 owned by Sumifru at Osmeña village, Compostela town.

Moreover, labor organizations were also labelled as legal fronts of an underground armed struggle movement and arrested activists were routinely accused of possessing firearms and ammunition.

The National Federation of Sugar Workers (NFSW), established by Negrense sugarcane workers in La Carlota, Negros Occidental in 1971, had been denounced as a front for the Communist Party of the Philippines as well as accused of profiteering on privately owned land. This then became the ex post facto justification for the Sagay massacre in which nine NFSW members were killed. Violent socioeconomic conflict has been a plague on a heavily stratified Negrense society since the 1850s.

In the same month of October 2018, the government released a matrix of names involved in what it alleged to be a "Red October" plot. The list included names of activists from the Liberal Party, the Catholic Church, universities, and various human rights and labor groups. Transportation strikes organized against the rapid modernization of jeepneys were swept up by the Department of Transportation as a communist plot.

José "Jerry" Catálogo of the NFSW had also reportedly been placed under taxpayer-paid surveillance before his subsequent assassination in Escalante by unidentified gunmen.

In October 2019, the management of the Coca-Cola plant in Bacolod City revealed that a man called Ka Tom Mateo, who was allegedly a former armed insurgent now reporting directly to the president, denounced the recognized union of the plant as a subversive organization and attacked the union's collective agreement and dues structure, which urged their members to terminate their membership and disaffiliate from the labor union.

The Coca-Cola Company has distinguished itself in recent years for an incapacity to document labor-rights violations at its own operations and those of its bottlers in Haiti, Indonesia, Ireland and the USA.

At the start of 2020, the Defend Jobs Philippines stated that the Philippine National police (PNP) and Armed Forces of the Philippines (AFP) used black propaganda against union leaders and labor unions by holding such a forum and orientation through the Task Force to End Local Communist Armed Conflict (TF-ELCAC), which was organized through President Duterte's Executive Order 70, and organizing it at the National Housing Authority Office in Quezon City, Philippines.

The Defend Jobs Philippines spokesperson Thadeus Ifurung explained that such moves to deal with the dissent of the workforce present red-tagging and maliciously identifying union leaders and members among the public sector as 'communists' and endangers their safety and right to self-organization as workers.

The Pagkakaisa ng Manggagawa sa Timog Katagalugan (Pamantik-KMU), a labor federation, was accused by the police and military in February 2020 of being the "front organizations of the CPP-NPA" after a July surrender ceremony where the officials claimed that 131 "surrenderees" came from the labor sector in various parts of Laguna, where allegedly 94 were members of the Pamantik-KMU.

Along with presenting the 131 "surrenderees," the police also presented what they claimed as surrendered arms and propaganda materials used by the so-called surrenderees, which included books, pamphlets, Mao caps, and election materials for national-democratic party Bayan Muna.

Devout Christians and anticommunists, such as labor organizer Johnny Tan and his colleagues in the Federation of Free Workers, were themselves not spared from being "tagged as communists" as early as the 1950s.

The red-tagging of labor unions as subversive organizations is believed to be an attempt to legitimize and incite violence and repression in order to undermine union organization, spread fear among workers, and discourage them from forming independent unions.

=== Lawyers and judges ===
Lawyers and judges have also been red-tagged. In January 2021, the AFP falsely accused human rights lawyers Roan Libarios, Alexander Padilla, and Rafael Aquino of having been armed rebels who have been captured or killed. The Integrated Bar of the Philippines called the allegations "ridiculous" and pointed out that red-tagging endangers not just the wrongfully accused but also their families and friends. The IBP also said that "red-tagging is unfair, illegal and disregards due process and the rule of law." The AFP Information Exchange later apologized and said it was conducting an internal investigation regarding the Facebook post where the accusations were published.

The red-tagging of a Mandaluyong regional trial court judge was condemned by human rights' groups, law professors, the Commission on Human Rights, and the Supreme Court. The Supreme Court in a statement condemned "in the strongest sense every instance where a lawyer is threatened or killed and where a judge is threatened and unfairly labelled." The red-tagging of the judge was condemned in both the House of Representatives and the Senate.

The Supreme Court of the Philippines in a judgment by Marvic Leonen promulgated on February 29, 2024, fined Lorraine Badoy PHP30,000 for indirect contempt of court for publishing vitriolic statements and outright threats. She was convicted of online red-tagging Manila RTC Judge Marlo Magdoza-Malagar, whom she called an "idiot judge" who lawyered for the CPP-NPA.

=== Journalists ===
The Facebook page of National Task Force to End Local Communist Armed Conflict (NTF-ELCAC) posted a series of infographics that incorrectly said media giant ABS-CBN's franchise was not renewed because "they have issues with the law." Verified pages of the Presidential Communications Operations Office (PCOO) and Radio Television Malacañang (RVTM) shared NTF-ELCAC posts pertaining to ABS-CBN's franchise. This act of NTF-ELCAC and the involved government pages were condemned by journalists, academics and media groups as "black propaganda offensive" and an abuse of authority of NTF-ELCAC that endangers ABS-CBN's workforce and Maria Ressa.

Journalists have raised concerns over worsening attacks against the press after the red-tagging of veteran journalist Froilan Gallardo and a former National Union of Journalists of the Philippines (NUJP) director Leonardo Vicente "Cong" Corrales who received a death threat. Journalists and artists are tagged as supporters of "communist terrorists" and active members of the Communist Party of the Philippines or the New People's Army.

Pampanga TV manager Sonia Soto, who is also the president of the media arm of the LausGroup of Companies, was red tagged by National Intelligence Coordinating Agency (NICA) regional director Rolando Asuncion during a forum at Don Honorio Ventura State University in Bacolor town. The director alleged she was among 31 radio broadcasters in the country with links to communist and terrorist groups.

After "Ang Iskul kong Bakwit," a documentary by Atom Araullo, aired on GMA News TV's i-Witness, alleged Indigenous people leaders described the documentary as "blatantly propagandistic" and accused Araullo of being "biased." Said IP leaders went as far as linking journalist Araullo to the communist insurgency through his mother, Carol Araullo, chairperson of Bayan. NUJP condemned the NTF-ELCAC for using the same "incredulous tactic" used by the government to vilify critics by linking them to the communist insurgency.

In December 2024, the Quezon City Regional Trial Court ordered SMNI TV hosts Lorraine Badoy and Jeffrey Celiz to pay damages of PHP2.08 million for red-tagging Atom Araullo, to compensate for the effect of "red-tagging and its effects on his personal life and career as a journalist". The court order was the first application of the May 2024 Supreme Court ruling that defined red-tagging as a threat to a person's right to life, liberty, and security.

=== Teachers and students ===
According to the Alliance of Concerned Teachers (ACT), there were 37 incidents of red-tagging and terrorist-tagging of teachers from 2018 to January 2023. In April 2023, ACT filed a complaint before the International Labour Organization against Vice President Sara Duterte and the NTF-ELCAC for allegedly red-tagging teachers. The Philippine Commission on Human Rights advised Sara Duterte and other government officials to refrain from red-tagging teachers, students, and activists. The commission also launched an investigation into allegations of red-tagging of teachers committed by the Philippine National Police and the National Intelligence Coordinating Agency.

In October 2018, the Commission on Human Rights stated that the AFP "endangers students" through its "blanket act of red-tagging" when the AFP released an unverified list of schools it alleged were part of the supposed "Red October" plot to oust President Duterte.

The red-tagging, surveillance, and harassment of students and faculty, as well as state-sponsored historical distortion, are viewed as threats to academic freedom in the Philippines.

=== Writers and authors ===
On August 11, 2020, private Filipino citizen Jefferson Lodia Badong accused novelist and Duterte-critic Lualhati Bautista of being a member of the New People's Army (NPA), an allegation that endangered Bautista's personal safety. Bautista posted a screenshot of the comment on her Facebook wall. The post trended and commenters admonished Badong for harassing Bautista and red-tagging, an act that endangers its target and is used to curtail free speech. Badong wrote a public apology and made his account private. Badong later deleted the apology minutes after posting it. In another post, Bautista threatened to sue Badong for cyberlibel along with a screenshot of his profile. Bautista later said that she will not be proceeding with the case as Badong has sent her a private apology, which Bautista posted. In the aftermath, Badong deactivated his account after he was continually shamed by supporters and friends of Bautista.

=== Religious organizations ===
The National Council of Churches in the Philippines, the World Council of Churches and the Society of Jesus have also been red-tagged. The University of San Carlos of the Catholic Church has been tagged as an active CPP supporter as well as being affiliated with a "satanic cult", referencing the cultural Marxism conspiracy theory and Karl Marx's family's alleged "satanic" Sabbateanism.

=== Humanitarian activity ===
Humanitarian organization Oxfam has been accused by the Philippine Department of National Defense of being a communist and terror front. Security forces raided the offices of other red-tagged organizations and arrested 57 individuals.

Practical bottom–up efforts rooted in the traditional and precolonial spirit of bayanihan have been threatened with glib accusations of sympathizing with causes condemned by the NTF-ELCAC. Community pantries, set up in the wake of the COVID-19 pandemic, had been denounced by state officials as being fronts for the Communist Party of the Philippines. Antonio Parlade disapproved of the widely circulating narrative that the state had been inadequate in responding to the effects of its own measures in containing COVID-19. Lorraine Badoy-Partosa also slammed the National Democratic Front of the Philippines for allegedly setting up community pantries for seditious purposes. Karapatan, in an official statement, hit back, stressing, "Having already been the cause of hardship in the first place, they now have the gall to intimidate?" Panfilo Lacson has also praised the mutual-aid efforts of pantry organizers.

In 2021, Leyte Center for Development (LCDE), which provides humanitarian aid to the Leyte's poorest communities, was subject to intimidation, death threats, and red-tagging. A rally, allegedly organized by the Philippine Army, brought 20 people carrying placards red-tagging the LCDE. The groups was charged with terrorism financing, though the cases were eventually dismissed by the prosecutor. In spite of the dismissal, LCDE's bank accounts were frozen and the group were forced to stop operations.

=== Entertainers ===
In 2020, actress Angel Locsin was allegedly accused by Lt. Gen. Antonio Parlade of being a member of the NPA. Foreign Secretary Teodoro Locsin Jr. retaliated by slamming the actress' slanderers, tweeting "Anyone [who] messes with her will get it. I am not allowed to threaten on Twitter."

In October 2020, Lt. Gen. Antonio Parlade Jr. of the National Task Force to End Local Communist Armed Conflict (NTF-ELCAC) urged supporters of the government to refrain from "red tagging" actress Liza Soberano after she appeared on a webinar of GABRIELA, but appeared to have done it himself anyhow. Parlade warned her that engaging with activist groups like GABRIELA would make her end up like activist Josephine Lapira, who allegedly joined the NPA and was killed in an armed encounter with government troops. He also mentioned several other celebrities who are vocal against the government such as beauty queen Catriona Gray and actress Angel Locsin. Soberano's camp denounced the "red tagging" of the actress. Gabriela Women’s Partylist Representative Arlene Brosas, with senators Risa Hontiveros and Francis Pangilinan defended Soberano and criticized Parlade's "red tagging," while the Concerned Artists of the Philippines (CAP) urged the general to retract his statement and apologize to the actress.

=== State institutions and public servants ===
One of the most prominent targets of red-tagging by what had then been the Committee on Un-Filipino Activities (CUFA), modeled after the Committee on Un-American Activities, had been Claro M. Recto. A fervent nationalist, he dared to oppose US national interests in the Philippines, as when he campaigned against its military bases in his country. During the 1957 presidential campaign, the US Central Intelligence Agency (CIA) conducted black-propaganda operations to ensure his defeat, including the distribution of condoms with holes in them and marked with "Courtesy of Claro M. Recto" on the labels. Other luminaries such as Arsenio Lacson, José P. Laurel and Lorenzo M. Tañada had also been made targets.

The Philippine Commission on Human Rights, a constitutional agency independent of the three branches of government, mandated to monitor human rights abuses by state actors, has also received various threats from the government. On Christmas Eve of 2021, COMELEC was similarly tagged as "infiltrated", as well as likened to Marcus Junius Brutus.

In October 2020, Lt. Gen. Antonio Parlade accused Manila Mayor Isko Moreno of "fear[ing]" and "welcoming … terrorist[s]" to the city. Moreno had earlier ordered the taking down of unauthorized tarpaulins that declared CPP members, NPA fighters and national democrats as personae non gratae in the city. Cavite Governor Jonvic Remulla backed the Manila mayor on the issue, saying that the general "should be ashamed of himself," adding, "Are you out of your mind, Parlade?" Meanwhile, Pamalakaya, which represents fisherfolk and coastal communities in Cavite, have retaliated against Parlade in defense of Remulla, urging the governor to instead declare the general as persona non grata in their province. Some commentators have satirized the banality and meaninglessness that has come to characterize, on the one hand, red-tagging and, on the other, false accusations leading to tokhang; for instance, by pointing out the absurdity in tagging the likes of Bongbong Marcos and economic liberal and declared NTF-ELCAC supporter Leni Robredo red.

== Government response to the concept ==
=== Duterte administration ===
Government officials and former press secretary Rigoberto Tiglao said that it was Sison himself who had unwittingly "tagged" specific groups red, including by identifying them online. Sison disputed this by stating that, "I differentiated the legal forces of the National Democratic movement from the armed revolutionary movement."

On October 27, 2020, Parladé clarified that, "Communism per se … if it's just belief in communism and that belief isn't paired with violence, I think everyone would get along. … In fact, in Europe … there are still many communist parties, but that's okay since they don't maintain armed wings. Their societies have come to accept them. But over here, it's different: [the CPP-1968] has an armed wing. And that's why we're having this problem." Likewise, on March 16, 2021, he said that, "It's the same with the right: if you're far right, and you [cross the line] by taking up arms and trying to overthrow the [government], that's a whole other story."

Human rights organizations denounced the government for red-tagging, profiling, and surveillance.

In 2019, United Nations rapporteurs said that the "criminalizing discourse used by Philippine public officials undermines the value of the vital work of human rights defenders, denigrates them in the eyes of the public and may put them at risk of threats, violence or other forms of harassment", adding that threats and harassment hinder the groups from doing their work.

In a 2020 report, the Commission on Human Rights called on members of the executive branch of government to desist from red-tagging and labelling defenders as terrorists or enemies of the state and to prohibit the practice.

=== Marcos administration ===
In an interview on June 9, 2022, incoming National Security Adviser Clarita Carlos expressed a strong disapproval of red-tagging, stating that under the incoming presidency of Bongbong Marcos, the administration will focus on the lack of opportunities and injustices that are not being addressed that are at "the roots of insurgency". This was echoed by outgoing Department of Justice (DOJ) secretary and incoming Solicitor General Menardo Guevarra, who stated at a forum on June 15 that the DOJ does not condone labeling individuals and groups as those with links to armed insurgency groups, saying that if there is concrete evidence, it should be filed according to the legal process. Guevarra also discouraged tagging individuals solely for being vocal about their political views as doing so would put them in danger. In response to some NTF-ELCAC officials that have publicly red-tagged individuals and groups, Guevarra also stated that the DOJ has expressed its position to the NTF-ELCAC, but is unaware if his advice has been followed. Furthermore, Guevara said that the NTF-ELCAC must follow its main mandate of a "whole of nation approach" to the communist insurgency problem, which must attract insurgents to return to the "folds of the law" and not to openly engage them in combat.

In July 2023, the Supreme Court of the Philippines ruled in Siegfred D. Deduro Vs. Maj. Gen. Eric C. Vinoya, in his capacity as Commanding Officer of the 3rd Infantry Division, Philippine Army that a writ of amparo may be issued against acts of red-tagging, vilification, labeling, and guilt by association, declaring that the aforementioned acts threatens a person's right to life, liberty, and security.

In September 2023, the Office of the Ombudsman convicted former NTF-ELCAC spokespersons Antonio Parlade and former undersecretary Lorraine Badoy of conduct prejudicial to the best interest of the service for red-tagging activists.

In February 2024, United Nations Special Rapporteur for freedom of expression and opinion Irene Khan appealed to the Philippine government to end red-tagging, saying that the vilification is often "followed by threats, unlawful surveillance, attacks or even unlawful killing."

After the Supreme Court ruled in May 2024 that red-tagging threatens a person's right to life, liberty, or security, Human Rights Watch and Karapatan called on President Bongbong Marcos to abolish the NTF-ELCAC. Marcos rejected the calls for abolition, saying the task force was instrumental in reducing the country's internal security threat.

== Media coverage ==
While there is some coverage of red-tagging as a practice in Filipino mainstream news coverage, media watchgroups such as the Center for Media Freedom and Responsibility have noted that this is typically limited to reportage regarding the statements of the groups involved, and few news outlets add "the necessary explanation why the profiling of the two organizations is dangerous". In a January 2019 statement, they said:

Dissent is essential to a working democracy. The independent press has to remind its audience of that fact as attempts to discredit various groups critical of the current regime continue, rather than just report statements of public officials condemning the politics of the Left and publicly naming those they see as "Red".

On March 3, 2022, Clarita Carlos urged precision when using the term 'communist' in political discourse, in which it is often conflated with the CPP-1968 and affiliated groups. She strongly insisted on dropping the term 'communist insurgency' in favor of 'insurgency', the latter which would underscore its illegality rather than its ideological thrust, which itself is not prohibited under law.

== Laws related to red-tagging ==
=== Human Security Act of 2007 ===
The Human Security Act of 2007, passed by the Philippine Congress in February and signed by President Gloria Arroyo in March, took effect on July 15. It was amended with the Anti-terrorism Act of 2020.

This act has been heavily criticized by Human Rights Watch due to its "vague and overbroad" definition of terrorism. The definition, according to Human Rights Watch,

...could allow the government to transform less serious offenses, such as vandalism, or legitimate acts of protest, into crimes punishable by a mandatory 40-year sentence. Under this definition, for example, a political protestor demanding that the president resign, who sets fire to an effigy (committing arson or destruction of property), could conceivably be charged with terrorism and, if convicted, sent to prison for 40 years.

=== The Anti-terrorism Act of 2020 ===
On June 11, 2020, Malacañang, through Presidential Spokesperson Harry Roque, dismissed claims that the government is out to red-tag opposition groups as a matter of policy, contradicting observations made by the United Nations Human Rights Office. Roque said that safeguards are in place to prevent such abuses in the proposed Anti-Terrorism Act.

In contrast, the UN took note of "serious human rights violations" in the country, noting that the filing of charges against political opponents and labeling persons who appear to have communist sympathies as suspected criminals are among the lapses.

Additionally, under the law, a suspect could be detained for 14 days without charge – a period that can be extended to 24 days. Human rights attorneys say that violates a constitutional provision that a person must be charged within three days of detention. The law also allows wiretaps and lengthy surveillance, which raises privacy concerns, according to rights activists. The new law also includes a possible punishment of life imprisonment without parole, which rights advocates say leaves no chance for rehabilitation.

Defenders of the law say that the 2020 Anti-Terrorism Act puts the Philippines at par with other countries in the world in legal action against terrorism. The government has also reassured that "activism is not terrorism" and that the law contains language protecting advocacy, protest, dissent, industrial action, and strikes that do not create "a serious risk to public safety." National Security Adviser Hermogenes Esperon defended the maximum of 24-day detention by saying that criminal cases against arrested suspected terrorists need more than three days of case build-up, which was the limit previously set in the Human Security Act of 2007. This new limit on the detention period is one of the most limited in the Asia-Pacific region, according to Esperon.

== Investigations ==
The Senate committee on national defense concluded its probe on red-tagging in February 2021. While the committee report concluded that a law criminalizing red-tagging was not needed, it said that Antonio Parlade's actions were "undue public propaganda" that were damaging to the National Task Force to End Local Communist Armed Conflict and the Armed Forces of the Philippine. Representatives France Castro, Carlos Zarate, Ferdinand Gaite, Eufemia Cullamat, Arlene Brosas, and Sarah Elago of the Makabayan bloc in the House of Representatives stated that "Current legal remedies are insufficient, defective and lacking. Human rights violators have largely escaped accountability. Experience has shown that even with the protective writs (habeas corpus, amparo, data), victims remain vulnerable to harassment and fail to deter attacks".

At a House of Representatives hearing in September 2020, Philippine National Police announced that it would investigate the alleged red-tagging done by Abra, Romblon, Leyte, and Surigao del Sur police stations against progressive organizations. In September 2022, the Philippine National Police announced that it would probe a police station that red-tagged Ninoy Aquino on Ninoy Aquino Day. Representative Raoul Manuel said at a House hearing that the post amounted to both disinformation and historical distortion.

The Commission on Human Rights in July 2024 began a public inquiry on the red-tagging of rights defenders in the Philippines. Speakers at the probe included United Nations special rapporteur on freedom and opinion Irene Khan, United Nations special rapporteur on the situation of human rights defenders Mary Lawlor, United Nations senior human rights adviser Signe Poulsen, George Andreopoulos of the John Jay College of Criminal Justice, Aua Baldé, chair of the working group on enforced or involuntary disappearances, Mel Sta. Maria, dean of the Far Eastern University Institute of Law, Theodore Te, former Supreme Court spokesperson and Free Legal Assistance Group regional coordinator, Christianne Grace Salonga, executive director of the Movement Against Disinformation, and Ephraim Cortez, president of the National Union of Peoples' Lawyers.

== See also ==
- McCarthyism
- Red-baiting
- Red Scare
- Extrajudicial killings and forced disappearances in the Philippines
- Security sector governance and reform in the Philippines
- Terrorism in the Philippines
- Far-right politics
