= New Bataan massacre =

2022 massacre in Davao de Oro, Philippines

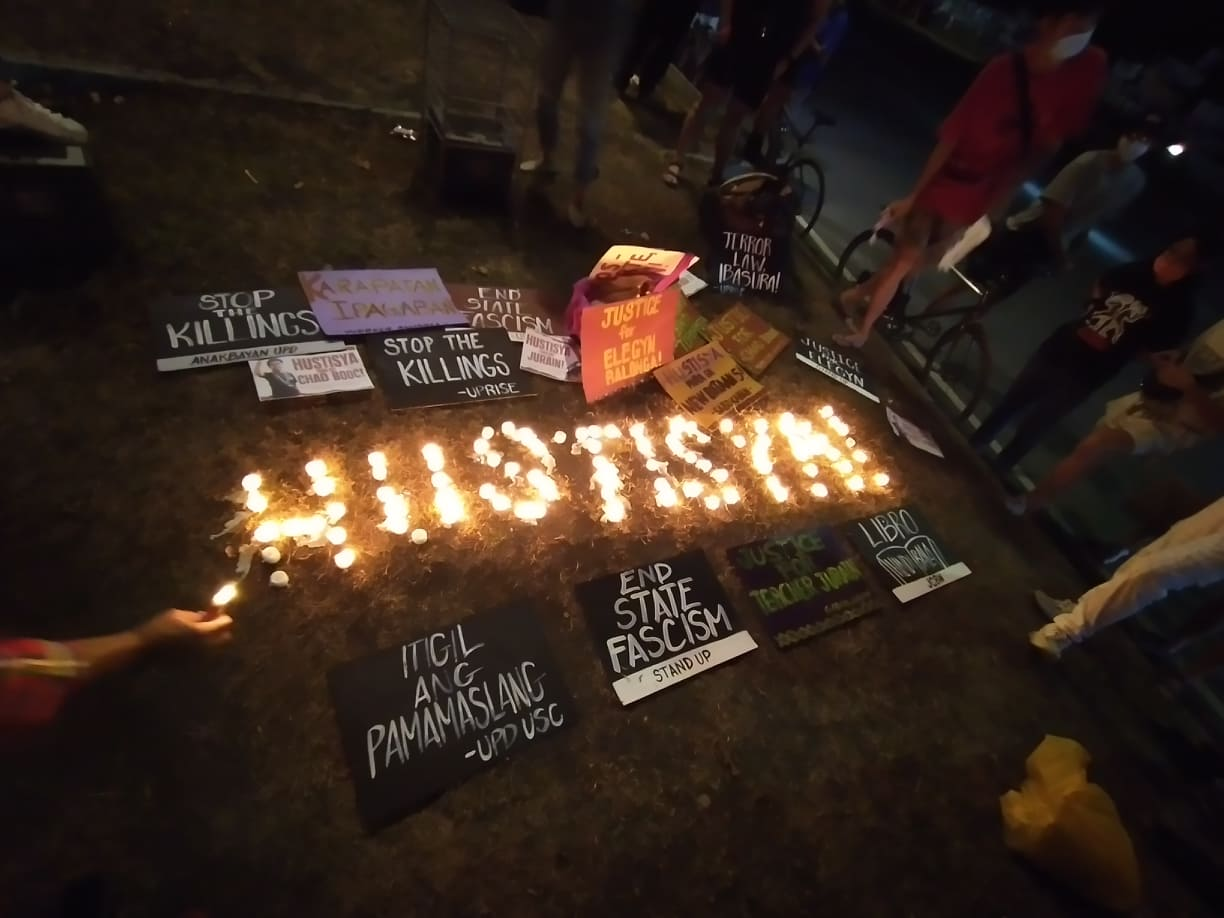
- Candle-lighting protest condemning the New Bataan massacre, March 6. The candles spell out Hustisya!, Filipino for "Justice!"
- Date: February 24, 2022
- Location: Barangay Andap, New Bataan, Davao de Oro, Philippines
- Deaths: 7

The New Bataan massacre occurred when five Lumad teachers and community workers and their two drivers were killed in Barangay Andap, New Bataan, Davao de Oro, Philippines, on February 24, 2022. The ones who were killed were Chad Booc, Gelejurain "Jurain" Ngujo II, Elegyn Balonga, Tirso Añar, and Robert Aragon—collectively termed as 'New Bataan 5'. Family members, advocacy groups and activists, and politicians have described the event as a massacre, while the Armed Forces of the Philippines asserted that what happened was an encounter between the forces of New People's Army (NPA) and the 10th Infantry Division of the AFP. The Communist Party of the Philippines (CPP) said that there were no NPA units in the area at the time of the event.

== Background ==
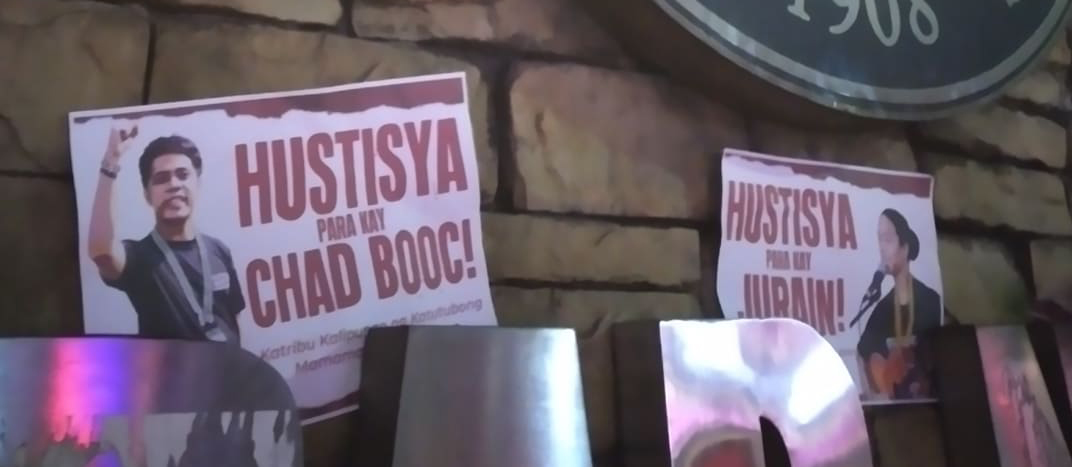
Placards calling for justice for New Bataan massacre victims.

Chad Booc, born on April 17, 1994, was a volunteer teacher and environmental advocate from Alternative Learning Center for Agricultural and Livelihood Development (ALCADEV), an alternative school for Lumad children. He was a graduate of the University of the Philippines with a cum laude degree in Computer Science. He started being a volunteer teacher in 2016. He was also known as an activist who shared on social media Lumad struggles against militarization and other hardships. He was red-tagged multiple times by the National Task Force to End Local Communist Armed Conflict (NTF-ELCAC). He was arrested twice: first at the Batasang Pambansa in July 17, 2017, along with other youth, in protest against Martial Law in Mindanao under President Rodrigo Duterte, and second, in Cebu City on February 15, 2021, during a police raid against a Lumad sanctuary in University of San Carlos. On May 14, the charges against Booc and six other teachers, datus, and students were dismissed and they were set free.

Gelejurain "Jurain" Ngujo II was a graduate of Liceo de Davao – Briz Campus in Tagum City with a degree in Secondary Education majoring in English. After his graduation, he became a teacher at a Lumad school, the Community Technical College of Southeastern Mindanao (CTCSM).

Elegyn Balonga was a community health worker from the United Church of Christ in the Philippines particularly in Haran, Davao City, which has served as a sanctuary for Lumads fleeing militarization from AFP and paramilitaries.

== Autopsy ==
An autopsy was done on the body of Booc by forensic pathologist Dr. Raquel B. Del Rosario-Fortun on March 7, 2022, and the results were released by March 10. According to the preliminary findings, the manner of death was homicide and Booc suffered from "internal hemorrhages with lacerations of the lungs, diaphragm, liver, spleen, stomach, intestines, right kidney and right adrenal gland." Fortun said that "there was an intent to kill. They sustained multiple gunshot wounds and on top of that, it looks like many things are being concealed."

Citing the autopsy results as "overkill" Lumad advocacy group Save Our Schools Network called for the Commission on Human Rights, and other national and international independent bodies to “conduct a swift, impartial and thorough investigation of the New Bataan 5 massacre.”

== Reactions ==
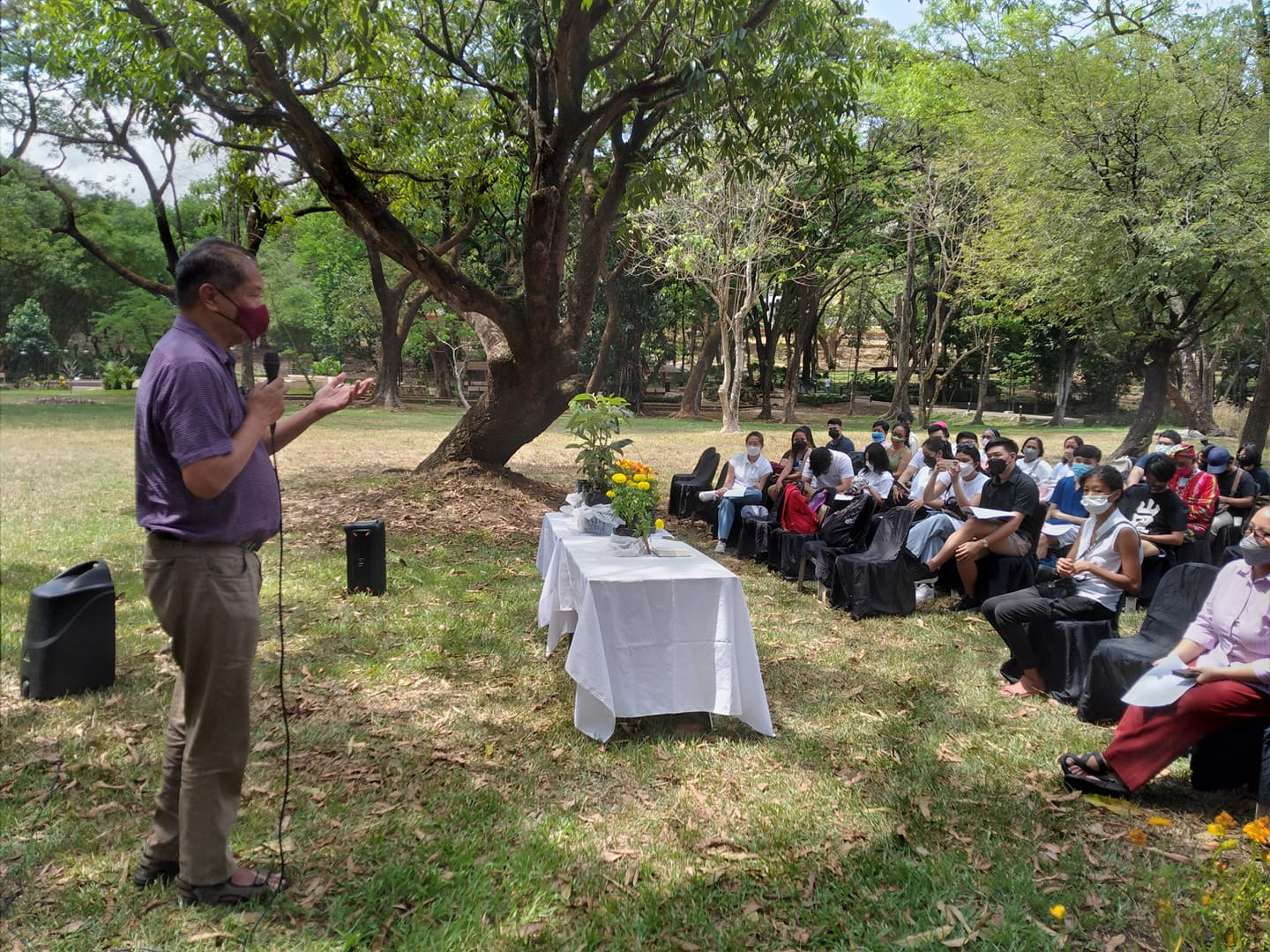
Atty. Antonio La Viña condemned the New Bataan massacre.

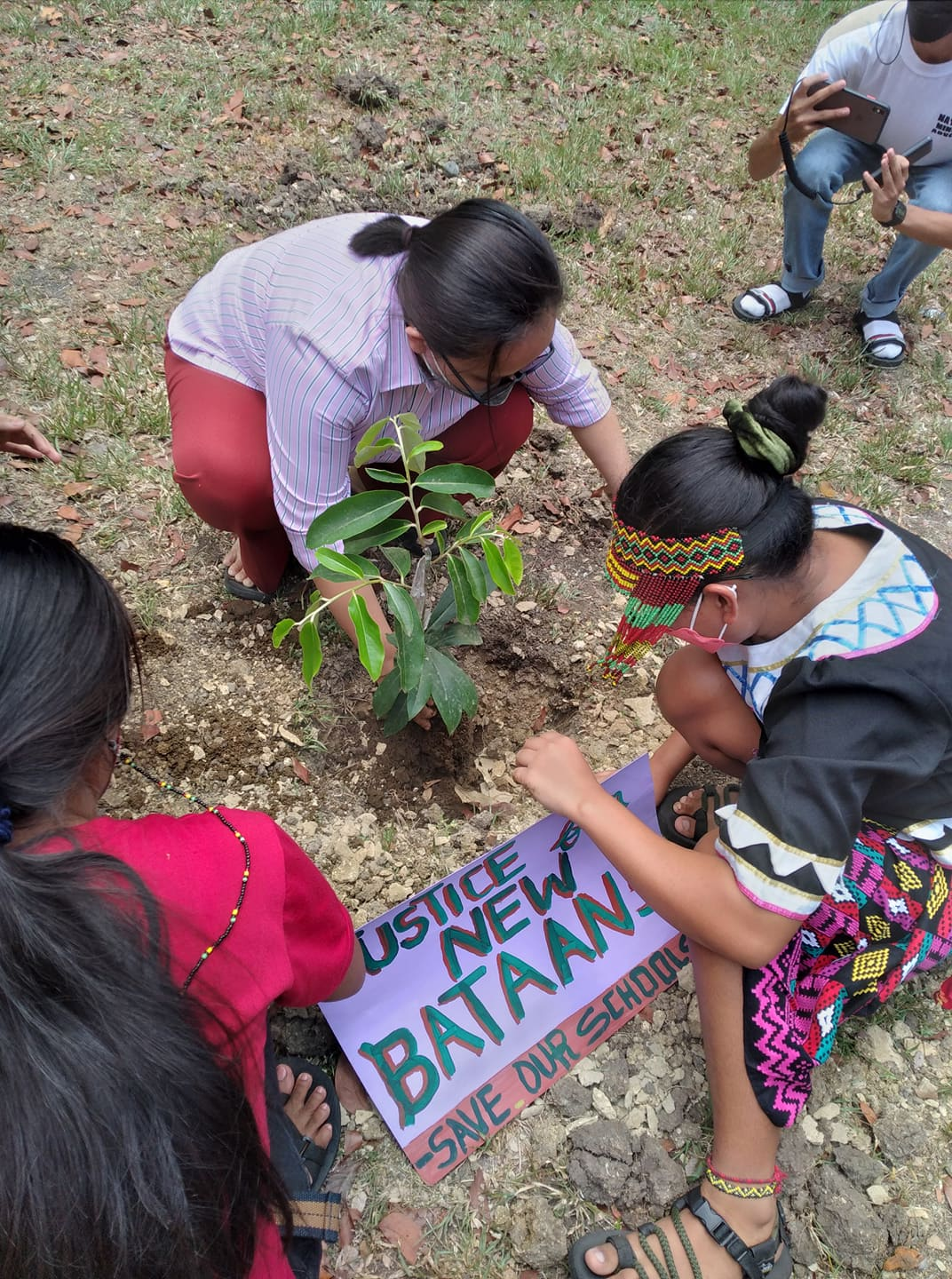
Tree planting commemoration for New Bataan massacre victims, April 6, 2022.

Greenpeace, on February 27, 2022, issued a statement of condemnation, decrying the red-tagging and killing of the 'New Bataan 5'.

The University of the Philippines denounced the massacre on a statement released on March 7, 2022. UP College of Engineering also called for justice. Other student organizations, including UP Cebu University Student Council, also condemned the massacre.

Former Bayan Muna Representative Neri Colmenares also denounced the massacre, urging an impartial investigation. He also condemned the press releases of the AFP that paraded the dead bodies as NPA combatants. According to Bagong Alyansa Makabayan Secretary General Renato Reyes, dissenters like Booc are not terrorists, contrary to the AFP claim.

Atty. Antonio La Viña, who was the legal counsel of Save Our Schools and Booc, also condemned the massacre.

Senator Leila de Lima called for further independent investigation on the matter. Vice presidential aspirant Senator Kiko Pangilingan said that impunity in the country must stop, after reading a placard demanding justice for New Bataan 5 at a campaign sortie.

Protests were launched to condemn the massacre and the AFP. These include protests in UP Cebu on February 26 and UP Diliman on March 6.

On April 4, 2022, commemorating forty days after the massacre, religious people, students, and other advocates conducted an ecumenical service and tree-planting ceremony in UP Diliman. A day before, youth mass organizations such as Student Christian Movement of the Philippines, Anakbayan, and League of Filipino Students launched a surprise 'lightning rally' in front of Camp Aguinaldo to condemn the AFP.

Karapatan called for an independent and impartial investigation, condemning the militarization of the Duterte administration and NTF-ELCAC. The group denounced continued red-tagging by the NTF-ELCAC through the massacre that happened.

Groups such as the International Coalition for Human Rights in the Philippines, Anakbayan USA, IBON Foundation also condemned the massacre.
