= Cristina Palabay =

Filipino human rights advocate

Cristina T. Palabay is a prominent Filipino human rights advocate and feminist best known for her work as the Secretary General the human rights advocacy organization Karapatan, and for her previous work as spokesperson of the Gabriela Women's Party.

Before becoming Secretary-General of Karapatan, Palabay also played key roles in organizations such as Bagong Alyansang Makabayan (Bayan), and the National Union of Students of the Philippines (NUSP).

Because her advocacy often leads her to call out government abuses, Palabay has also become known for constantly being faced with risks and threats, with her security concerns including surveillance, judicial harassment, and various death and rape threats, and constantly being subjected to the practice of red-tagging, where she is falsely tagged as a "communist" or "terrorist".

Palabay's work has led her to be recognized by French and German governments which named her one of 15 recipients of the 2021 Franco-German Prize for Human Rights and the Rule of Law.

== See also ==
- Gabriela Women's Party
- Human rights in the Philippines
