= Zara Alvarez =

Filipino human rights activist and social activist (1981–2020)

- Born: 25 March 1981
- Died: 17 August 2020 (aged 39); Bacolod, Philippines
- Cause of death: Murder
- Occupations: Social activist, human rights advocate, educator, paralegal

Zara Alvarez (25 March 1981 – 17 August 2020) was a Filipina human rights advocate, educator, paralegal, church worker, and prominent social activist who predominantly campaigned against human rights violations during the administration of Rodrigo Duterte. She was well known for her active campaign to protect human rights in the Philippines, which became a matter of concern during the presidency of Rodrigo Duterte. During her career as a human rights activist, she was often a prime target of political mafia and reported to have received numerous death threats due to her active campaigns against human rights violations. On 17 August 2020, she was assassinated by unknown gunmen. According to human rights groups, her murder suggested a serious major crackdown against human rights activists and civilians in the Philippines.

== Career ==
Alvarez, a single mother, was actively involved in social activism and served as a paralegal staffer helping to spotlight cases regarding human rights violations on Negros Island to the United Nations Human Rights Council. She also worked as a volunteer for the human rights organisation Karapatan where she served as the education director and also associated closely with the Negros Island Health Integrated Program as an advocacy officer.

In 2018, she was purposely included in an official terror list among 600 individuals by the Duterte administration to silence her. She was detained by the Philippine National Police for nearly two years until 2020.

In a manifestation filed with the Supreme Court of the Philippines on 1 September 2020, Karapatan said Alvarez was supposed to be a witness on the red-tagging and harassment of human rights workers.

== Murder ==
On 17 August 2020, at around 8 pm, she was reportedly shot several times by unidentified gunmen along the Sta. Maria Street in Eroreco, Barangay Mandalagan, Bacolod. She was apparently targeted by gunmen while she was heading home after buying dinner.

She was killed on the day of the funeral of peace activist Randall Echanis, who was assassinated on 10 August 2020. She was the 13th member of Karapatan to be murdered since Rodrigo Duterte came to power in 2016.

=== Reactions ===
International rights group International Coalition for Human Rights condemned and denounced the killing of the activist and, in an official statement, it stated that Alvarez was a brave figure and staunch defender of farmers and Filipino rights.

Her murder sparked hot debate in the international community criticizing the newly passed Anti-Terrorism Act of 2020 (Republic Act No. 11479), a measure giving the government more powers to act against persons or groups falling under what critics say is a dangerous and vague definition of terrorism.

In light of Alvarez's murder, the House of Representatives requested the Supreme Court to make it easier for rights activists such as Alvarez to seek protection under the writ of amparo. The Supreme Court administrator said the court will review guidelines for the writ.

== See also ==
- Negros Island killings
- Red-tagging in the Philippines
- Ericson Acosta
