= Davao de Oro Provincial Board =

Legislative body of the province of Davao de Oro, Philippines

Davao de Oro Provincial Board Sangguniang Panlalawigan ng Davao de Oro

Type
- Type: Unicameral
- Term limits: 3 terms (9 years)

Leadership
- Presiding Officer: Dorothy Montejo-Gonzaga, PFP since June 30, 2025

Structure
- Seats: 14 board members 1 ex officio presiding officer
- Political groups: Lakas (5) PFP (5) Nonpartisan (3) TBD (1)
- Length of term: 3 years
- Authority: Local Government Code of the Philippines

Elections
- Voting system: Multiple non-transferable vote (regular members); Indirect election (ex officio members); Acclamation (sectoral member)
- Last election: May 12, 2025
- Next election: May 15, 2028

Meeting place
- Davao de Oro Provincial Capitol, Nabunturan

The Davao de Oro Provincial Board is the Sangguniang Panlalawigan (provincial legislature) of the Philippine province of Davao de Oro, previously known as "Compostela Valley".

The members are elected via plurality-at-large voting: the province is divided into two districts, each having five seats. A voter votes up to five names, with the top five candidates per district being elected. The vice governor is the ex officio presiding officer, and only votes to break ties. The vice governor is elected via the plurality voting system province-wide.

The districts used in appropriation of members is coextensive with the legislative districts of Davao de Oro.

Aside from the regular members, the board also includes the provincial federation presidents of the Liga ng mga Barangay (ABC, from its old name "Association of Barangay Captains"), the Sangguniang Kabataan (SK, youth councils) and the Philippine Councilors League (PCL). Davao de Oro's provincial board also has a reserved seat for its indigenous people (IPMR).

== Apportionment ==
Elections	Seats per district		Ex officio seats	Reserved seats	Total seats
Elections	1st	2nd	Ex officio seats	Reserved seats	Total seats
2010–present	5	5	3	1	14

== List of members ==
=== Current members ===
These are the members after the 2025 local elections and 2023 barangay and SK elections:

- Vice Governor: Dorothy Montejo-Gonzaga (PFP)

Seat	Board member	Party	Start of term	End of term
1st district	Herv Martelle Z. Apsay	Lakas	June 30, 2022	June 30, 2028
1st district	Kimberly Benazir May R. Codilla	Lakas	June 30, 2025	June 30, 2028
1st district	Joel D. Basañes II	Lakas	June 30, 2025	June 30, 2028
1st district	Joanna Aileen A. Gentugaya	PFP	June 30, 2019	June 30, 2022
1st district	Ramil L. Gentugaya	PFP	June 30, 2025	June 30, 2028
2nd district	Ruwina S. Gonzaga	PFP	June 30, 2022	June 30, 2028
2nd district	Conie B. Caballero	Lakas	June 30, 2025	June 30, 2028
2nd district	Francis P. Secuya	PFP	June 30, 2025	June 30, 2028
2nd district	Macario T. Humol	Lakas	June 30, 2019	June 30, 2028
2nd district	Cesar D. Richa	PFP	June 30, 2025	June 30, 2028
ABC	Randi Opisan	Nonpartisan	July 30, 2018	January 1, 2023
PCL	TBD		June 30, 2025	June 30, 2028
SK	Charlemagne Bautista	Nonpartisan	June 8, 2018	January 1, 2023
IPMR	Felipe Masambo	Nonpartisan		

== Past members ==
=== Vice Governor ===
Election year	Name	Party	Ref.
2016	Manuel E. Zamora	Liberal	
2019	Maricar Zamora	Hugpong	
2022	Tyron Uy	Hugpong	
2025	Dorothy Montejo-Gonzaga	PFP	

=== 1st District ===
- Population (2024):

Election year	Member (party)	Member (party)	Member (party)	Member (party)	Member (party)	Ref.
2016	Joanna Aileen A. Gentugaya (Liberal)	Marie Jude F. Lopoz (Liberal)	Nena G. Atamosa (Liberal)	Joseph T. Jauod (Liberal)	Renato B. Basañes (Liberal)	
2019	Adolfo Ang (HNP)	Marie Jude F. Lopoz (HNP)	Nena G. Atamosa (HNP)	Joseph T. Jauod (HNP)	Renato B. Basañes (HNP)	
2022	Wilfredo C. Ang (PDP–Laban)	Marie Jude F. Lopoz (HNP)	Herv Martelle Zamora-Apsay (HNP)	Eutropio S. Jayectin (HNP)	Renato B. Basañes (HNP)	
2025	Kimberly Benazir May R. Codilla (Lakas)	Joel D. Basañes II (Lakas)	Herv Martelle Zamora-Apsay (Lakas)	Joanna Aileen A. Gentugaya (PFP)	Ramil L. Gentugaya (PFP)	

=== 2nd District ===
- Population (2024):

Election year	Member (party)	Member (party)	Member (party)	Member (party)	Member (party)	Ref.
2016	Arturo T. Uy (Liberal)	Kristine Mae T. Caballero-Rañon (Aksyon)	Raul B. Caballero (Aksyon)	Macario T. Humol (Liberal)	Vivencia L. Secuya (Liberal)	
2019	Arturo T. Uy (HNP)	Kristine Mae T. Caballero-Rañon (HNP)	Raul B. Caballero (HNP)	Macario T. Humol (HNP)	Vivencia L. Secuya (HNP)	
2022	Ruwina S. Gonzaga (PDP–Laban)	Kristine Mae T. Caballero-Rañon (HNP)	Raul B. Caballero (HNP)	Teodoro Arancon (PDP–Laban)	Vivencia L. Secuya (HNP)	
2025	Ruwina S. Gonzaga (PFP)	Conie B. Caballero (Lakas–CMD)	Macario T. Humol (Lakas–CMD)	Francis P. Secuya (PFP)	Cesar D. Richa (PFP)	
