= Marie Hilao-Enriquez =

Filipino human rights activist (1953–2022)

- Born: 27 June 1953; Sorsogon, Bicol Region, Philippines
- Died: 22 April 2022 (aged 68); Covina, California, United States
- Education: University of the Philippines
- Occupation: Human rights activist
- Years active: 1972–2022
- Organization: Karapatan
- Known for: Support of the victims of political violence in the Philippines
- Relatives: Liliosa Hilao (sister)

Amaryllis "Marie" Rapi Hilao-Enriquez (27 June 1953 – 24 April 2022) was a Filipino human rights activist. A member of the underground Kabataang Makabayan movement during the period of martial law under Ferdinand Marcos, she was imprisoned and tortured between 1974 and 1976. Following the People Power Revolution and the end of the Marcos regime in 1986, Hilao-Enriquez led several human rights groups with the aims of maintaining democracy in the Philippines and advocating for victims of political oppression and violence.

== Early life and education ==
Hilao-Enriquez was born on 27 June 1953 in Sorsogon in the Bicol Region, one of nine children, including her older sister Liliosa; their father was a fisherman. While Hilao-Enriquez was still in school, the family moved to Manila, where she completed her education and enrolled at the University of the Philippines to study occupational therapy.

== Activism ==
In 1972, while Hilao-Enriquez was a student, Ferdinand Marcos, the President of the Philippines announced that he had placed the country under martial law in response to a "communist threat" and a "sectarian rebellion" posed by the Communist Party of the Philippines and the Muslim Independence Movement, respectively. Hilao-Enriquez subsequently joined the Kamuning chapter of Kabataang Makabayan, a communist youth organisation that had been forced underground by Marcos' declaration of martial law; she later dropped out of university in order to become a full-time community organiser. Several of Hilao-Enriquez's siblings were vocal critics of martial law, including her sister Liliosa, who was a student journalist at the Pamantasan ng Lungsod ng Maynila and had criticised Marcos' measures in student newspapers.

=== 1973 killing of Liliosa Hilao ===
On 4 April 1973, officers from the Philippine Constabulary raided the Hilao family home in Manila without a warrant. Hilao-Enriquez, who was at home at the time, was able to escape by jumping over a wall while the officer supervising her fell asleep. She warned her sisters about the officers' presence at the home, but Liliosa opted to return home that evening; Hilao-Enriquez stated that this was due to her concerns for their mother's health. Liliosa was subsequently arrested, and on 7 April the family were informed that she had died of cardio-respiratory arrest. Liliosa is widely considered to have been the first woman and the first activist to die in detention during the martial law period, with it assumed that she died as a result of torture while in custody.

=== 1974 arrest and detention ===
Following Liliosa's death, Hilao-Enriquez and her husband, Romy Enriquez, continued to work for Kabataang Makabayan in rural areas of the Philippines. On 7 October 1974, the couple were arrested and detained in Pampanga in Central Luzon, where they were tortured and detained; several other of Hilao-Enriquez's family members, including her brother and sister-in-law, were also arrested. Hilao-Enriquez gave birth to their daughter, Liza Liliosa, while detained. She was initially held at Camp Olivas in San Fernando. During her detention, Hilao-Enriquez went on a successful hunger strike staged as a protest against poor prison conditions at Camp Bagong Diwa in Taguig, where she and other political prisoners were being held.

Hilao-Enriquez was released on 6 July 1976. She subsequently joined Kapisinan para sa Pagpapalaya at Amnestiya ng mga Detenidong Pulitikal sa Pilipinas in order to call for the release of her husband from custody.

=== Subsequent activism ===
In 1986, following the People Power Revolution and the end of the Marcos regime, Hilao-Enriquez became known as a critic of the Marcos family and campaigned against members of the family returning to Filipino politics; she also called publicly for reparations to be paid for victims of political violence during the martial law period, and for Ferdinand Marcos to be held accountable for human rights abuses. Hilao-Enriquez joined and eventually became the chairperson of Samahan ng Ex-Detainees Laban sa Detensyon at Para sa Amnestiya (SELDA), which campaigned for legal and financial justice for victims of the Marcos regime; SELDA contributed to the passing of the Human Rights Victims Reparation and Recognition Act and the subsequent creation of the Human Rights Victims' Claims Board, which awarded compensation to over 11,000 victims before it closed in 2018. Through SELDA, Hilao-Enriquez filed a lawsuit against Marcos in Hawaii, where he was living in exile, with her mother and sister named among 10 plaintiffs. In 1992, the Marcos estate was ordered to pay 776 million USD in compensatory damages and 1.2 billion in exemplary damages.

In 1995, Hilao-Enriquez co-founded Karapatan, a human rights organisation that documented human rights abuses by the Philippines government. Hilao-Enriquez became Karapatan's chairperson in 2009, and contributed to reports on human rights abuses during the presidencies of Gloria Macapagal Arroyo and Rodrigo Duterte. In 2007, Hilao-Enriquez spoke on extrajudicial police killings before the East Asian and Pacific Affairs Committee of the United States Senate Committee on Foreign Relations. That same year, she petitioned the United Nations Human Rights Council to direct the Philippine government to end extrajudicial killings, citing 60 cases of killings reported to Karapatan between January and June 2007.

In 2007, Hilao-Enriquez became a member of the Ecumenical Voice for Peace and Human Rights in the Philippines, an alliance of faith and human rights groups. She was nominated by the National Democratic Front of the Philippines to act as an independent observer of peace talks in Oslo.

In 2016, after Bongbong Marcos, the son of Ferdinand Marcos, announced his plans to run as a candidate in the 2016 Philippine presidential election, Hilao-Enriquez founded the Campaign Against the Return of the Marcoses and Martial Law, an organisation that campaigned against members of the Marcos family returning to the Filipino political scene.

== Death ==
In 1998, Hilao-Enriquez was diagnosed with osteoporosis, and suffered with poor health in her later life, including Parkinson's disease. She died on 24 April 2022 in Covina, California, of complications of Parkinson's disease, at the age of 68.

=== Response ===
Karapatan said it was "deeply indebted to her brilliant, selfless and passionate work among the foremost human rights defenders in the Philippines". The National Union of Peoples' Lawyers called Enriquez "an icon of the human rights struggle". The United Nations special rapporteur Philip Alston described Enriquez as "the real deal" and "an outstanding example of someone who dedicated her life to human rights". The National Council of Churches in the Philippines praised her for "amplifying" the voices of Filipino people nationally and internationally, particularly victims of human rights violations.
