= New Bataan =

Municipality in Davao de Oro, Philippines

- Municipality
- Municipality of New Bataan
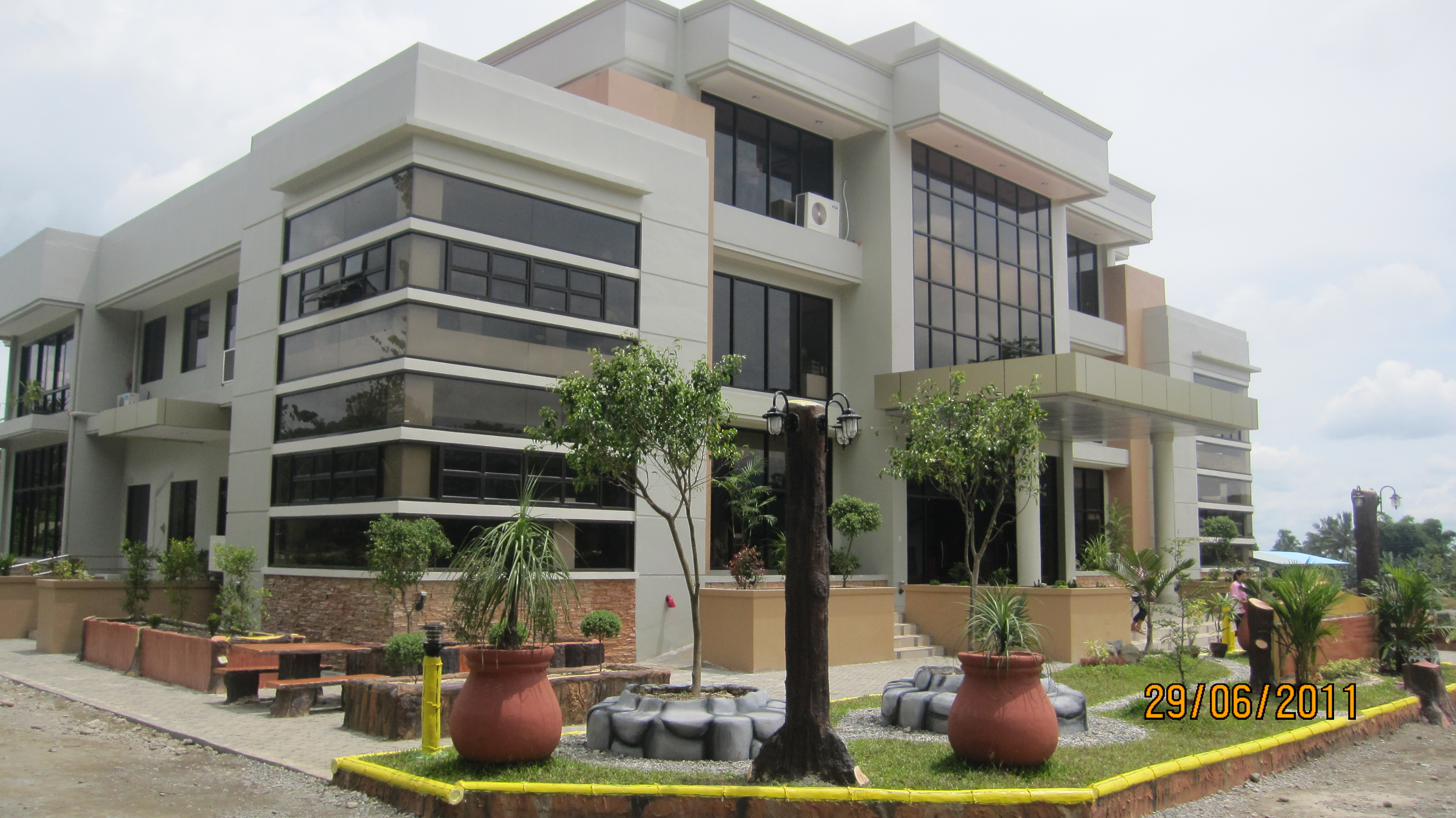
- New Bataan Municipal Hall

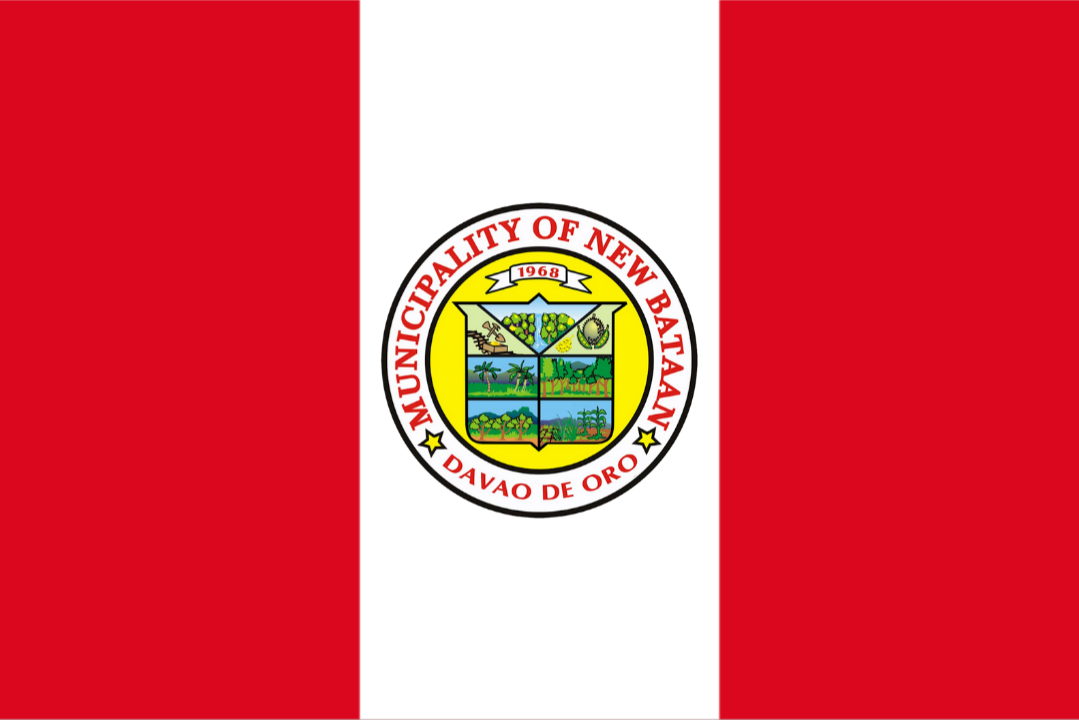
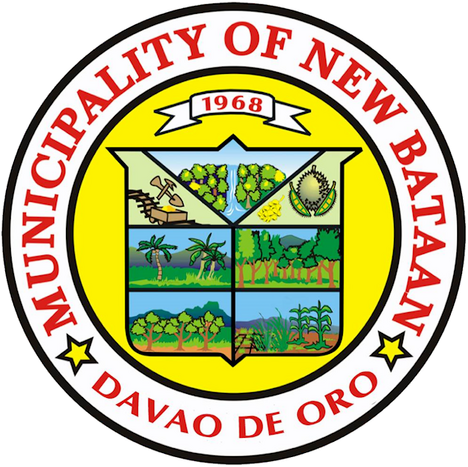
- Flag Seal
- Motto: Bida ang Katawhan
- Map of Davao de Oro with New Bataan highlighted
- Interactive map of New Bataan
- Location within the Philippines
- Coordinates: 7°32′54″N 126°08′17″E
- Country: Philippines
- Region: Davao Region
- Province: Davao de Oro
- District: 1st district
- Founded: June 18, 1966
- Named for: Bataan
- Barangays: 16 (see Barangays)

Government
  - Type: Sangguniang Bayan
  - Mayor: Atty. Mar Bianca F. Cualing-Brua
  - Vice Mayor: Elfa P. Digaynon
  - Representative: Maria Carmen S. Zamora-Mabanglo
  - Electorate: 36,826 voters (2025)

Area
  - Total: 553.15 km^{2} (213.57 sq mi)
- Elevation: 752 m (2,467 ft)
- Highest elevation: 2,664 m (8,740 ft)
- Lowest elevation: 64 m (210 ft)

Population (2024 census)
  - Total: 50,212
  - Density: 90.775/km^{2} (235.11/sq mi)
  - Households: 12,781

Economy
  - Income class: 1st municipal income class
  - Poverty incidence: 20.12% (2023)
  - Revenue: ₱ 334.5 million (2024)
  - Assets: ₱ 942.4 million (2024)
  - Expenditure: ₱ 317.6 million (2024)
  - Liabilities: ₱ 188.9 million (2024)
- Time zone: UTC+8 (PST)
- ZIP code: 8804
- PSGC: 1108210000
- IDD : area code: +63 (0)87
- Native languages: Davawenyo; Cebuano; Kalagan; Mansaka; Tagalog; Ata Manobo
- Patron saint: San Antonio de Padua
- Website: www.new-bataan.gov.ph

New Bataan, officially the Municipality of New Bataan (Cebuano: Lungsod sa Bag-ong Bataan; Tagalog: Bayan ng Bagong Bataan), is a municipality in the province of Davao de Oro, Philippines. According to the 2024 census, it has a population of 50,212 people.

== History ==
New Bataan was founded as a municipality of Davao on June 18, 1966, through Republic Act No. 4756. The municipality was named in honor of former First Lady Luz Banzon Magsaysay, a native of Bataan who helped approve the town site reservation in what is now Barangay Cabinuangan.

New Bataan later became part of Davao del Norte upon the partition of Davao on May 8, 1967, and Compostela Valley (now Davao de Oro) beginning in 1998.

New Bataan was one of the worst-hit municipalities by Typhoon Pablo on December 4, 2012.

== Geography ==
New Bataan has a total land area of 55,315 hectares (136,690 acres) and is situated north and west of Davao Oriental province; south of Municipality of Compostela and west of Municipality of Maragusan. It is surrounded by mountain ranges, with over 50% of its territory being forest cover that has been the source of livelihood for some people living there. The barangays of New Bataan that are mostly covered with forest are Andap, Tandawan, Camanlangan, Manurigao. Manurigao is the most remote among the barangay because of the absence of a better road and transportation.

The municipality is also watered by various rivers. One of which is the Mayo River that flows from the mountain of Andap and empties into the Agusan River. The Batoto river is also one of the biggest, it flows from the western part of the area. The northwestern portion of the municipality forms part on the contiguous plain of Compostela valley.

It is about 16 kilometers (9.9 mi) from Compostela, 40 kilometers (25 mi) from the provincial capital Nabunturan, and 75 kilometers (47 mi) from Tagum.

=== Barangays ===
New Bataan is politically divided into 16 barangays. Each barangay consists of puroks while some have sitios.

- Andap
- Bantacan
- Batinao
- Cabinuangan (Poblacion)
- Camanlangan
- Cogonon
- Fatima
- Kahayag
- Katipunan
- Magangit
- Magsaysay
- Manurigao
- Pagsabangan
- Panag
- San Roque
- Tandawan

=== Climate ===
Climate data for New Bataan
Month	Jan	Feb	Mar	Apr	May	Jun	Jul	Aug	Sep	Oct	Nov	Dec	Year
Mean daily maximum °C (°F)	22 (72)	22 (72)	22 (72)	23 (73)	24 (75)	23 (73)	23 (73)	23 (73)	24 (75)	24 (75)	23 (73)	22 (72)	23 (73)
Mean daily minimum °C (°F)	17 (63)	17 (63)	17 (63)	17 (63)	18 (64)	19 (66)	18 (64)	18 (64)	19 (66)	19 (66)	18 (64)	17 (63)	18 (64)
Average precipitation mm (inches)	194 (7.6)	173 (6.8)	139 (5.5)	122 (4.8)	236 (9.3)	305 (12.0)	249 (9.8)	211 (8.3)	214 (8.4)	257 (10.1)	241 (9.5)	181 (7.1)	2,522 (99.2)
Average rainy days	21.0	18.4	18.7	20.0	26.5	28.1	27.7	27.1	25.7	27.3	25.6	22.1	288.2
Source: Meteoblue (modeled/calculated data, not measured locally)

=== Land classification ===
- Forest: 33,727.7261 ha (130.223478 sq mi)
- Agro-forest: 2,158.6502 ha (8.334595 sq mi)
- Agricultural: 692.7559 ha (2.674745 sq mi)
- Mining: 6,210.401 ha (23.97849 sq mi)
- Residential: 11.843 ha (0.04573 sq mi)
- Brush land: 2,158.6502 ha (8.334595 sq mi)
- Commercial: 11.5962 ha (0.044773 sq mi)
- Road: 62.06395 ha (0.2396303 sq mi)
- Institutional: 18.91645 ha (0.0730368 sq mi)
- Special use: 3.1605 ha (0.012203 sq mi)
- Industrial: 0.3828 ha (0.001478 sq mi)
- Rivers/canals: 38.3858 ha (0.148208 sq mi)

== Demographics ==
Population census of New Bataan
Year	Pop.	±% p.a.
1970	19,978	—
1975	26,637	+5.94%
1980	32,887	+4.30%
1990	39,629	+1.88%
1995	43,327	+1.69%
2000	42,549	−0.39%
2007	45,309	+0.87%
2010	47,470	+1.71%
2015	47,726	+0.10%
2020	51,466	+1.60%
2024	50,212	−0.59%
Source: Philippine Statistics Authority

In the 2024 census, the population of New Bataan was 50,212 people, with a density of 91 inhabitants per square kilometre or 240 inhabitants per square mile.

- Birth rate (crude): 28.82 (2005)
- Death rate (crude): 4.12 (2005)

== Economy ==
Poverty incidence of New Bataan

Source: Philippine Statistics Authority

- Annual local income: P5,761,257.97 (2005)
- Internal revenue allotment: P52,636,316 (2005)

Major crops

- Coconut
- Rice
- Corn
- Banana
- Coffee/Cacao
- Abaca/Bamboo

== Transportation ==
Road network (within the LGU territory):

- National road: 35.75 kilometres (22.21 mi)
- Provincial road: 40.45 kilometres (25.13 mi)
- Municipal road: 102.50 kilometres (63.69 mi)

== Culture ==
The town's festivals include Araw Celebration, held annually on 18 June; Founder's Day, held every 10 August; and the Sal’lupongan Festival, held every 13 June to honour the town’s patron saint, Anthony of Padua.
