= Tony La Viña =

Philippine lawyer and environmentalist

Undersecretary of the Department of Environment and Natural Resources
- In office 1996–1998
- President: Fidel V. Ramos

Personal details
- Born: Antonio Gabriel Maestrado La Viña; October 22, 1959 (age 66) Cagayan de Oro, Philippines
- Spouse: Maria Carmen Bonto
- Children: 3
- Education: Ateneo de Manila University (BA) University of the Philippines Diliman (JD) Yale University (LL.M, JSD)
- Occupation: Lawyer; professor
- Website: tonylavina.wordpress.com

Antonio Gabriel Maestrado La Viña (born October 22, 1959) is a Filipino lawyer, academic, and environmentalist.

He is currently an associate director and head of the Kilma Center at the Manila Observatory and a professor of law, philosophy, politics and governance in several universities in the Philippines. He is also a member of the Permanent Court of Arbitration.

La Viña was the dean of the Ateneo de Manila University School of Government and was an undersecretary of the Department of Environment and Natural Resources from 1996 to 1998. He also co-founded several non-government organizations in the Philippines.

== Education ==
La Viña was born in Cagayan de Oro to lawyer and academic Gabriel La Viña and Lourdes Maestrado y Chaves, who would later serve as city councilor for Cagayan de Oro, and is the daughter of Silvino Dacapio Maestrado, former Congressman for the 1st District of Misamis Province. He is the younger brother of former Social Security System Commissioner and Department of Tourism undersecretary Jose Gabriel "Pompee" La Viña.

He graduated from the Ateneo de Manila University in 1980 with a Bachelor of Arts degree in philosophy. After teaching philosophy at the Ateneo and Xavier University, he took up law at the University of the Philippines (UP) College of Law. He would later place third in the 1989 Philippine Bar Examination. La Viña spent several years as a professor of law at UP in the 1990s, and as a human rights and environmental attorney serving indigenous peoples and other local communities.

From 1991 to 1995, La Viña attended Yale Law School in New Haven, Connecticut, for his Master of Laws and Doctor of Juridical Science degrees. At Yale, he focused on international environmental law and policy and wrote a dissertation on climate change. That dissertation was later published as a book (Climate Change and Developing Countries: Negotiating a Global Regime) by the Institute of International Legal Studies of the University of the Philippines Law Center.

== Career ==
While studying at the UP College of Law, La Viña co-founded the Legal Rights and Natural Resources Center (LRC) with Supreme Court Associate Justice Marvic Leonen, Dr. Gus Gatmaytan, and Atty Nonette Royo. He was LRC Director of Research and Development from 1987–91 and then from 1993–96. He also joined the Free Legal Assistance Group.

In 1996, at the age of 36, he was appointed Undersecretary for Legal and Legislative Affairs of the Department of Environment and Natural Resources (DENR). As undersecretary, his office emphasized the rights of indigenous peoples and local communities, efficient and fair access to justice in administrative decisions, public participation and stakeholder consensus building in environmental decision-making, and innovative programs in environmental regulation. (Note: In The Green Tiger: The Costs of Economic Decline in the Philippines, Barbara Goldoftas tackles, as a case study, the application of an Environmental Compliance Certificate (ECC), being contested by residents of the affected site, which case was handled by La Viña during his term as DENR Undersecretary, and which demonstrates the principles he applied in his term: "In the mid-1990s, a proposal... to build a cement plant and sprawling industrial center in Bolinao, Pangasinan, split the fishing town... The undersecretary responsible for the case at the (DENR), Antonio La Vina (sic), focused the decision about the necessary Environmental Compliance Certificate on the principal of social acceptability: whether or not the rapid industrialization would be acceptable to the community. This case study provides an important example of how difficult decisions about sustainable development can be made at the local level, how they can be made with transparency and community involvement, and how a community may respond to the potential changes brought about by rapid industrialization.") Part of his duties included serving as the DENR's crisis manager, where he dealt with the department's response to, among others, the Marcopper mining disaster.

In addition, he was chief negotiator for the Philippines in the implementation of Conventions on Biological Diversity and Climate Change from 1996-1998, where he was recognized as the lead negotiator for developing countries in the negotiation of the Kyoto Protocol on Climate Change and the Cartagena Protocol on Biosafety. He served as undersecretary until June 1998.

From 1998 to 2006, he was director of the Biological Resources Program and Senior Fellow in Institutions and Governance of the World Resources Institute in Washington D.C.

In 2006, La Viña returned to the Philippines to accept an invitation to become dean of the Ateneo School of Government (ASoG), succeeding acting dean Antonette Palma-Angeles.

In addition to these roles, he served as adviser to the Philippine delegation to the United Nations Framework Convention on Climate Change (UNFCCC), and Coordinator in 2011-2012 for the Group of 77 and China for the Ad Hoc Working Group on the Durban Platform for Enhanced Action on Climate Change. He served as a key facilitator for the Reducing Emissions from Deforestation and Degradation-Plus (REDD+) negotiations under the UNFCCC from 2009 to 2011. He was a lead negotiator and spokesperson of the Philippine delegation during the 2015 Paris climate negotiations.

La Viña's other current corporate and policy positions include:

- Member, Board of Trustees, Manila Observatory
- Member, Board of Trustees, Center for International Environmental Law (CIEL)
- Member, Board of Trustees, Southeast Asia Regional Initiatives for Community Empowerment (SEARICE)
- Previously, La Vina was a member of the Board of Trustees of Bioversity International and Center for International Forestry Research. He was chair, Board of Trustees, Institute for Social Entrepreneurship in Asia (ISEA)
- Convenor, Movement Against Disinformation

La Viña is the spokesperson of Senator Loren Legarda.

== Publications ==
As an academic, lawyer, and environmental expert, La Viña has authored or edited numerous books, anthologies, monographs, and journal articles, mostly on environmental topics and issues. His experience in environmental issues has led him to author the chapter on environmental law and cases for the Benchbook for Philippine Trial Judges (Revised and Expanded); and Philippine Law and Ecology (Vol. 1: National Laws and Policies and Vol. 2: International Treaties and Rules on Procedure), the last two of which are compilations of laws, international instruments, legal cases, and commentary on the constellation of Philippine environmental policy and jurisprudence.

He maintains a biweekly column, "Eagle Eyes", in the Manila Standard Today, and contributes to the Philippine social news site Rappler, where he comments on Philippine and international issues on the environment, socio-economic development, governance, and current affairs. He also maintains a column, "The Riverman's Vista" in the Mindanao current affairs news website MindaNews.

In 2024, he published his memoir, Ransomed by Love: A Changemaker’s Unfinished Journey in Cagayan de Oro.

== Personal life ==
La Viña is married to Maria Carmen Bonto-La Viña, a psychotherapist. They have three sons: Emmanuel, a historian and linguist; Enrico Antonio, a PhD candidate in political science at University of California, Davis; and Rafael, a graduate of UP Law.
