= Karapatan =

Philippine human rights advocacy organization

- Karapatan Alliance Philippines
- Formation: 19 August 1995
- Type: Human rights non-government organization
- Purpose: Human rights activism
- Location: Philippines
- Fields: Human rights education and training, campaign and advocacy, legal services, human rights violations documentation and research, lobbying
- Members: 16 regional chapters and more than 40 member civil society organizations
- Secretary General: Cristina Palabay
- Chairperson: Elisa Tita Lubi
- Website: www.karapatan.org

Karapatan Alliance Philippines (commonly shortened to Karapatan, which translates to rights in Filipino) is a left-wing non-governmental organization and human rights alliance that conducts research and advocacy of human rights campaigns as well as monitoring and documentation of human rights violations in the Philippines, particularly in the context of the Philippine government's campaign against the communist insurgency in the country and the peace negotiations between the Philippine government and the National Democratic Front of the Philippines.

Karapatan draws attention to human rights abuses in the Philippines through education campaigns and trainings, providing legal services to victims of human rights violations, and lobbying efforts in the country as well as engaging platforms such as the United Nations and other international human rights bodies.

Karapatan is a member of the International League of Peoples' Struggle, Asian Forum for Human Rights and Development, Civicus World Alliance for Citizen Participation, the SOS - Torture Network of the World Organisation Against Torture, and it also co-convenes the Ecumenical Voice for Human Rights and Peace in the Philippines and the Philippine Universal Periodic Review Watch.

== History ==
Karapatan was founded in 1995 by human rights activists who were active in the resistance movements against the regime of then-Philippine president Ferdinand Marcos.

In 2007, the organization's former secretary general Marie Hilao-Enriquez presented on extra-judicial political killings before the East Asian and Pacific Affairs Subcommittee of the United States Senate Committee on Foreign Relations, chaired by US Senator Barbara Boxer (D-Cal).

In 2019, after the Philippine government accused Karapatan of being a front for the Communist Party of the Philippines, which the government had labeled as a terrorist group in 2017, Karapatan filed several complaints with United Nations officials.

Zara Alvarez, former education director of Karapatan's regional chapter in Negros, was shot dead on 17 August 2020. She was Karapatan's 13th member to be killed under the administration of President Rodrigo Duterte, who has called Karapatan an "organization of demons" and an alleged "front" of communist rebels for Karapatan's criticism of the human rights violations in his "war on drugs." Karapatan has been alleged to be a particular target of Philippine security forces and their agents.

== Notable members ==
- Ali Macalintal
