= List of individuals honored at the Bantayog ng mga Bayani =

The Wall of Remembrance of the Bantayog ng mga Bayani honors the individuals who fought against the dictatorship of 10th president Ferdinand Marcos. Its roster included 333 names in 2023, and is updated every year.

== List ==
1. Abellana, Godofredo "Dodong"
2. Abiog, Napoleon Torralba
3. Aboli, Tayab "Arthur" Ayyungo
4. Acebedo, Norberto "Boyet" Hermoso Jr.
5. Acebedo, Roy Lorenzo Hermoso
6. Agatep, Zacarias Guimmayen
7. Aguilar, Zorro Campos
8. Aguirre, Danilo
9. Alcantara, Jose Esteban
10. Alegre, William
11. Alejandro, Leandro "Lean" Legere
12. Alingal, Godofredo Balladores
13. Alonto, Masiding Alangadi Sr.
14. Alto, Leo Clamor
15. Alvarez, Amada Enriquez
16. Alvarez, Emmanuel Igtiben
17. Alvarez, Marsman Turingan
18. Amatong, Jacobo Sybico
19. Anastacio, Marciano Peñaflor Jr.
20. Andal, Reynante Concha
21. Andres, Trifonio "Ponyong" Non
22. Ang Sinco, Edgar Catacutan
23. Anos, Leopoldo A.
24. Aquino, Benigno "Ninoy" Simeon Jr.
25. Aquino, Eduardo Quinto
26. Aquino, Jeremias Ancheta
27. Aquino, Maria Corazon "Cory" Cojuangco
28. Arce, Merardo Tuason
29. Arce, Santiago Bitac
30. Arceo, Ferdinand Mirasol
31. Ariado, Antonio "Tony" Grayda
32. Asuncion, Filomena Gambalan
33. Atienza, Monico "Nick" Montenegro
34. Baes, Aloysius "Ochie" Ureta
35. Balando, Elsa "Liza"
36. Balce, Floro Elep
37. Barros, Maria Lorena "Lorie" Morelos
38. Bautista, Manuel Candelaria
39. Begg, William Vincent Acuña
40. Belone II, Alexander "Totoy" Abonita
41. Beloria, Vicente "Vic" Laus
42. Beltran, Crispin "Ka Bel" Bertiz
43. Bernardo, Pepito Vicente
44. Blas, Catalino Deldoc
45. Bontia, Evella Villamor
46. Borja, David Sabadoquia
47. Borlongan, Edwin De Guzman
48. Brocka, Catalino "Lino" Ortiz
49. Bucag, Renato Lago
50. Bueno, David Triunfante
51. Bugay, Amado Guinto
52. Burgos, Jose "Joe" Gacusano Jr.
53. Cabarubias, Tranquilino "Trank" Damolo
54. Cabrera, Claro "Lito" Goingco
55. Cailing, Crisostomo "Tommy"
56. Calderon, Jose Ramos Jr.
57. Calixto, Leopoldo "Babes" Yulo Jr.
58. Camus, Fortunato "Toto"
59. Cariño, Jennifer Kintanar
60. Carpio, Jesus Antonio Matamarosa
61. Castillo, Aquilino
62. Castro, Rolando Mawirat
63. Catalla, Cristina Farma
64. Cayon, Cesar "Titang" Tiaga
65. Cayunda, Herbert Paña
66. Celestial, Artemio "Jun" Somoza Jr.
67. Cervantes, Benjamin Roberto "Behn" Holcombe
68. Cezar, Alfredo Celi Jr.
69. Checa, Jorge Montenegro
70. Chiva, Coronacion "Walingwaling"
71. Chua, William Tiu
72. Chuidian, Mary Consuelo Remedios Albert
73. Clarete, Ronillo Noel M.
74. Climaco, Cesar Cortes
75. Concepcion, Roberto Reyes
76. Constantino, Renato Reyes
77. Conti, Mary Concepcion Lourdes
78. Cortes, Ellecer Eugenio
79. Cortez, Delia dela Rosa
80. Cortez, Hernando "Adrian" Mondoy
81. Crismo, Romeo Guilao
82. Cupino-Armea, Julieta
83. Cupino, Edgardo Ranollo
84. Dalisay, Fortunato M.
85. Dalisay, Remigildo P.
86. Dapog, Eliseo Gunay
87. Dayanan, Michael
88. De Guzman, Lucio Estanislao "Boy" Parungao
89. Deheran, Pepito Lumanta
90. De Jesus, Jeremias Siapo
91. Dela Fuente, Edward Lahaylahay
92. Dela Paz, Remberto "Bobby" Daniel Alcantara
93. Del Rosario, Carlos "Charlie" Bernardo
94. Del Rosario, Nimfa "Nona" Borras
95. Demegilio, Rodney
96. Deveraturda, Dennis Rolando Ramirez
97. Dimaranan, Mariani Cuevas
98. Dingcong, Demosthenes
99. Diokno, Jose Wright
100. Dizon, Jose Pacturayan "Fr. Joe"
101. Dojillo, Edgardo "Boy" Galve
102. Domingo, Silme Garciano
103. Dorotan, Manuel Gabito
104. Dueñas, Ruth Emata
105. Dulag, Macli-ing
106. Dungoc, Pedro Sr.
107. Edralin-Tiglao, Raquel "Rock"
108. Enriquez, Albert Rivera
109. Escandor, Juan B.
110. Escribano, Suellen Coruna
111. Esperon, Fernando "Nanding" Torralba
112. Espinas, Alberto "Bert" Tuason
113. Estella-Simbulan, Lourdes "Chit" P.
114. Evangelio, Ronilo T.
115. Faustino, Gerardo "Gerry" T.
116. Favali, Tullio
117. Federis, Rolando Morallo
118. Fernandez, Jesus Flor
119. Fernandez, Pablo "Pabs" Galvez
120. Fernandez, Resteta "Res" Aguinaldo
121. Filio, Ricardo Pojol
122. Flores, Ceferino Arbon Jr.
123. Fortich, Antonio Yapsutco
124. Francisco, Oscar "Oca" Diamaro
125. Franco, Rovena Traje
126. Gabriel, Luis
127. Galace, Arthur Erfe
128. Galang-Reyes, Rosalinda "Roz"
129. Ganchero, Renato Mital
130. Garcia, Enrique Voltaire II
131. Garduce-Lagman, Lourdes "Dodie"
132. Gavanzo, Ceasar Grayda Jr.
133. Gayudan, Lumbaya Aliga "Ama Lumbaya"
134. General, Luis De Castro Jr.
135. Gillego, Bonifacio Hubilla
136. Glor, Melito Tierra
137. Gomez, Margarita "Maita" Favis
138. Gonzaga, Mary Virginia "Sister Gin"
139. Gonzales, Alexander Mecenas
140. Gonzales, Nicanor Rojas Jr.
141. Grey, Eugene David "Gene" Conejero
142. Guevarra, Rogelio Salayon
143. Hicaro, Cesar Ella
144. Hilao, Liliosa "Lilli" Rapi
145. Hilario, Antonio "Tonyhil" Mendinueto
146. Hizon, Manuel "Sonny" Llanes Jr.
147. Hollero, Manolo Jubelag Sr.
148. Ilagan, Laurente Calanog
149. Ilagan, Rizalina Parabuac
150. Ipong, Inocencio "Boy" Tocmo
151. Jallores, Romulo "Kumander Tangkad" Acetre
152. Jaravello, Juvelyn
153. Jasul, Alfredo Villaflor
154. Jasul, Ramon Villaflor
155. Javier, Evelio Bellaflor
156. Jimenez, Ester Dolores Misa Paredes
157. Jimenez-Magsanoc, Leticia
158. Jimenez, Virginia "Sister Mary Bernard"
159. Jopson, Edgar Gil "Edjop" Mirasol
160. Jose, Joel Cecilio Ozarraga
161. Juco, Estelita "Esty" Guinto
162. Kintanar, Ester "Teray" Resabal
163. Labatos, Alex Delos Santos
164. Labayen, Julio Xavier Lizares
165. Lacaba, Emmanuel "Eman" Agapito Flores
166. Lacbao, Ernesto Dog-ah
167. Lagarteja, Elmer Lis
168. Lagman, Hermon C.
169. Lagoc, Rodolfo Gedang
170. Laguerder, Edwin Dela Cruz
171. Landrito, Vergel "Butch" Edquilane
172. Lansang, Lorenzo Bonifacio "Nik" Celi
173. Lanzona, Eduardo "Taking" Estrella
174. Lape, Angelina Malinao
175. Laurella, Francisco "Frank" C.
176. Lazo, Emmanuel "Manny" Lumapit
177. Leaño, Salvador Fabella
178. Legislador, Edmundo "Toto Eddie" Rivera
179. Librado, Erasto "Nonoy" Ligo
180. Lingad, Jose "Joe" Bulaon
181. Llorente, Teresita Evangelista
182. Locanilao, Norberto Siacor
183. Lontok, Bayani Pulido
184. Lopez, Mariano "Rak" Mejia
185. Lorca, Napoleon Porras
186. Lorca, Rolando "Rolly" Porras
187. Loreto, Mary Catherine Lucinda Olavides
188. Lucman, Haroun Al Rashid
189. Lunas, Ruben Marinda
190. Maglantay, Rizaldy Jesus M.
191. Magpantay, Aurelio "Boy" Dimalibot
192. Mahinay, Julieto Navarette
193. Mahinay, Rodolfo Caraballo
194. Malay, Armando de Jesus
195. Malay, Paula Carolina "Ayi" Guevara Santos
196. Malicay, Alfredo Lumangtad
197. Manaog, Rodelo Zabala
198. Manglapus, Raul Sevilla
199. Manimbo, Renato Turla
200. Marasigan, Violeta "Bullet" Atienza
201. Marcos, Maria Remedios Violeta Sebastian
202. Marimon, Melecio "Tatin" Lanzaderas
203. Martinez, Asuncion "Sister Ason" Cabanas, ICM
204. Medina, Constantino Reyes
205. Megallen, Rogelio Sinanggote Jr.
206. Mendoza, Alfredo Lano
207. Mendoza, Armando Lano
208. Mercado, La Verne Diwa
209. Mesina, Pastor "Sonny" Relampagos
210. Mijares, Antonio "Diore" Sabuya
211. Mirabueno, Vicente Alex Adre
212. Molintas, Wright "Ka Chadli" Mencio Jr.
213. Monares, Claro Flores
214. Mondejar, Maria Luz Umbao
215. Montealto, Rodolfo Tapang
216. Morales, Horacio "Boy" Rosales Jr.
217. Morales, Nicasio "Nicky" Manalo
218. Morales, Rogelio Concepcion
219. Mordeno, Rodrigo
220. Muñoz-Palma, Cecilia Arreglado
221. Nieva, Antonio "Tony" Ma. Onrubia
222. Nofuente, Valerio "Lerry" Lonzame
223. Obispo, Immanuel "Imo" Medina
224. Olalia, Felixberto "Ka Bert" Santos Sr.
225. Olalia, Rolando "Ka Lando" Mariano
226. Olivar, Mateo Colinares
227. Ongpin, Jaime "Jimmy" Velayo
228. Ontong, Manuel "Manny" Farma
229. Orbe, James Macaling
230. Orcullo, Alexander Lavisorez
231. Ordoñez, Sedfrey Andres
232. Ornopia, Aniano Custodio
233. Orot, Nenita Traje
234. Ortigas, Gaston "Gasty" Zavalla
235. Ortigas, Virgil Montero
236. Ortiz, Pacifico Arreza
237. Osorio, Magnifico Libre
238. Pacheco-Mangulabnan, Evelyn
239. Padilla, Sabino "Abe" Garcia Jr.
240. Paduano, Joji Salupeza
241. Palabay, Armando "Mandrake" Ducusin
242. Palabay, Romulo Ducusin
243. Par, Maria Socorro Baronia
244. Pascual-Ladlad, Ma. Leticia Quintina "Tish" Jimenez
245. Pasetes, Benedicto Matawaran
246. Pastor, Fernando Tamayo Sr.
247. Pedro, Purificacion "Puri" Abarro
248. Peña, Jacinto Dechavez
249. Peralta, Romulo "Romy" Day-oan
250. Perez, Dante Dizon
251. Perez, Nicetas "Nick" Añonuevo
252. Pesquesa, Florencio "Ka Pisyong" Salvador
253. Petalcorin, Raymundo "Rhyme" Ortega
254. Pinguel, Baltazar "Bal" Alido
255. Plaquino, Joel Ballenas
256. Ponce, Rodrigo
257. Posa-Dominado, Maria Luisa "Luing"
258. Principe, Nestor "Ka Wadi" Labastilla
259. Prudente, Nemesio "Doc" Encarnacion
260. Purugganan, Miguel "Bishop Mike" Gatan
261. Quesada, Minda Luz M.
262. Quimpo, Ishmael "Jun" Ferrer Jr.
263. Quimpo, Ronald Jan Ferrer
264. Quintero, Eduardo Torcelo
265. Ragragio, Clemente Patricio
266. Resus, Arnulfo Altamirano
267. Reyes, Cecilio Antonio
268. Reyes, Jose Benedicto Luis
269. Reyes, Victor Dandan
270. Rigos, Cirilo Aquino
271. Robles, Reynaldo Laminaria
272. Roces, Joaquin "Chino" Pardo
273. Rodrigo, Francisco "Soc" Aldana
274. Rodriguez, Emerito "Pekong" Najaro
275. Romano, Rosaleo "Rudy" Boller, C.Ss.R.
276. Roque, Magtanggol Sayas
277. Roxas, Sofronio Pongos
278. Salac, Roberto Cabug-os
279. Sales, Jessica Mendez
280. Salili, Edgardo Gomez
281. Salonga, Jovito Reyes
282. Salvador, Soledad Nacional
283. Sampiano, Manuel "Buyog" Bocayla
284. Sanchez, Augusto "Bobbit" Santos
285. Santa Ana, Ronilo Japana
286. Santos, Antero Guerrero
287. Sarmiento, Abraham Pascual Jr.
288. Serrano, Isagani Rodriguez
289. Silva, Lazaro P. Jr
290. Sin, Jaime "Cardinal Sin" Lachica
291. Sison, Modesto "Bong" Castro
292. Sison, Teresito "Sito" De Guzman
293. Solana, Nicolas Moralizon Jr.
294. Sontillano, Francis Superal
295. Suarez, Juanito Jr.
296. Sumilang, Michael J.
297. Suyat, Benjamen Buena
298. Taca, Arturo Montemayor
299. Tagamolila, Antonio S.
300. Tagamolila, Crispin S.
301. Tañada, Lorenzo "Ka Tanny" Martinez
302. Tañada, Lorenzo M.
303. Tangente, Jose Aquilino T.
304. Tan, Manuel
305. Tan, Mary Christine L., RGS
306. Taojo, Romraflo R.
307. Tayag, Carlos Nuqui
308. Teehankee, Claudio Ong
309. Tejones, Caesar
310. Tierra, Noel C.
311. Torres, Alex G.
312. Torres, Amanteflor A.
313. Torres, Enrique "Eric" Dayson
314. Umali, Ysmael Gonzales
315. Valcos, Danilo C. Jr.
316. Valenzuela, Teofilo B.
317. Valerio, Nilo C.
318. Velez, Jose Mari U.
319. Viernes, Gene Allen
320. Villacillo, Venerando D.
321. Villados, Simplicio D.
322. Villanueva, Marcelino M.
323. Villaron-Tangente, Elma "Dalama"
324. Vizmanos, Danilo P.
325. Vytiaco, Ma. Antonia Teresa Villa
326. Yap, Emmanuel "Manny" del Rosario
327. Ybañez, Rolan Ylagan
328. Yorac, Haydee B.
329. Yuchengco, Alfonso Tiaoqui
330. Yuyitung, Quintin G.
331. Yuyitung, Rizal
332. Zaldivar, Calixto O.
333. Zumel, Antonio "Tony" De Leon

== Sources ==
- "Martyrs and Heroes - Mga Bayani". Bantayog ng mga Bayani. Bantayog ng mga Bayani Foundation. May 20, 2023.
