= La Verne Mercado =

La Verne Diwa Mercado (December 1921-July 2003) was a Filipino pastor and human rights advocate who served as Bishop of the United Methodist Church, and also served for 14 years as secretary-general of the National Council of Churches in the Philippines (NCCP), from 1973 to 1987. He was known for his effective use of diplomacy to unite NCCP member-churches and to advocate for human rights and for the active involvement of Christians in social issues.

In 1973, Mercado became Secretary General of the National Council of Churches in the Philippines (NCCP), a fellowship of non-Catholic Christian churches and denominations which at the time conisted of the Convention of Philippine Baptist Churches, Iglesia Evangelica Metodista En Las Islas Filipinas (Philippine Evangelical Methodist Church or IEMELIF); Iglesia Evangelica Unida de Cristo, Iglesia Filipina Independiente (the Philippine Independent Church), the Philippine Episcopal Church, the United Church of Christ in the Philippines, the Lutheran Church in the Philippines which had joined two years earlier. as well as Mercado's own United Methodist Church.

Through Mercado, the NCCP's member churches were able to denounce the abuses of the dictatorship in keeping with the prophetic role of the church in broader society. Journalist Domini M. Torrevillas notes that the NCCP under Mercado implementeed mamy programs which served victims of injustice "including political detainees," as well as releasing numerous public statements on issues such as "human dignity, national sovereignty, church-state relations and morality in government," among others, all despite the dangerous conditions of the time, when the Philippines was still experiencing Martial law under Ferdinand Marcos.

In June 1974, Mercado and a number of other NCCP staff and guests were arrested by the Marcos regime which accused them of "aiding enemies of the state." The resulting outrage in various church and ecumenical communities - both local and international - forced Ferdinand Marcos himself to order Mercado's release.

He continued serving as Secretary General of the NCCP until 1987, a year after Marcos was deposed by the People Power Revolution.

Mercado died of natural causes in July 2003. Mercado was later honored by having his name inscribed on the wall of remembrance of the Philippines' Bantayog ng mga Bayani, which honors the martyrs and heroes who fought the authoritarian regime of Ferdinand Marcos.

== See also ==
- Juan A. Marigza
- Magnifico Osorio
- Isabelo Magalit
- Salvador Leaño
