= Camp Lapu-Lapu =

Armed Forces of the Philippines installation in Cebu City

Coordinates: 10°20′12″N 123°54′07″E

Camp Lapulapu
- Cebu City, Philippines

Site information
- Type: Military Base
- Controlled by: Philippines

Site history
- Built: 1950
- In use: 1950–present

Garrison information
- Current commander: Maj. Gen. Pio Diñoso III
- Garrison: Philippine Army

Camp Lapulapu is a military installation of the Armed Forces of the Philippines in the Lahug District of Cebu City, Philippines. It is currently the headquarters of the AFP Visayas Command, although in October 2022 it was announced that the AFP Visayas Command would relocate their headquarters after the Cebu provincial government announced that they would take back the land on which the camp stands.

During the Marcos dictatorship, it was designated as one of the four provincial camps to become a Regional Command for Detainees (RECAD). It was designated RECAD III, housing prisoners from throughout the Visayas. Political detainees were typically brought there after initially being detained in other camps, such as nearby Camp Sergio Osmeña.

== Establishment ==
Camp Lapulapu was first established after World War II, when the 3rd Military Area (3MA), a wartime military unit under the United States Armed Forces in the Far East (USAFFE) was moved from its headquarters at Camp Guadalupe (now Barangay Guadalupe) to what was then the Lahug District of Cebu City. This move later led to the establishment of the present Barangay Apas and laid the foundation for the transformation of it and its neighboring barangays into highly urbanized areas.

== Postwar era ==
Camp Lapulapu remained the headquarters of the units which evolved of the 3MA after the war, including the Battalion Combat Team in the 1950s, and then the 3rd Brigade Separate which later President Fidel V Ramos commanded as a Philippine Army general before his stint as Philippine Constabulary Chief. It also hosted the Central Mindanao Command (CEMCOM)which covered the Mindanao military operations during the 1970s phases of the Moro conflict. After the reorganization of the Armed Forces in 1975, the area became home to the 3rd Infantry Division (3ID) of the Philippine Army.

== During the Marcos dictatorship ==
During the Marcos dictatorship, Camp Lapulapu was designated as one of the four provincial camps to become a Regional Command for Detainees (RECAD). It was designated RECAD III, housing prisoners from throughout the Visayas. Political detainees were typically brought there after initially being detained in other camps, such as nearby Camp Sergio Osmeña.

Among those arrested in the first week of Martial Law was Lawyer Meinrado Paredes, who would later become a Regional Trial Court executive judge, was imprisoned at Camp Sergio Osmeña for three months, and then moved to Camp Lapulapu where he would remain for the remainder of the year he would spend as a political detainee. Redemptorist Priest Amado Picardal was also initially imprisoned and tortured at Camp Sergio Osmeña to before he was moved to Camp Lapulapu.

== AFP Visayas Command ==
Further reorganization of the AFP in the late 80s, transferred the 3ID to Jamindan, Capiz, and the subsequent creation of the Regional Unified Command (RUC). The RUC later merged with other regional commands to form the Visayas Command (VISCOM). VISCOM was organized as an operating unit of the AFP to control Internal Security Operation (ISO) in the Visayas, which then became the forefather of the present-day Central Command (CENTCOM), AFP.

On August 11, 2021, the name of the Central Command was reverted to its original name as the Visayas Command.

== Future developments ==
In October 2022 it was announced that the AFP Visayas Command would relocate their headquarters after the Cebu provincial government announced that they would take back the land on which the camp stands.

== See also ==
- Camp Olivas
- Camp Vicente Lim
- Camp Evangelista
- Political detainees under the Marcos dictatorship
- AFP Visayas Command
