= Mary Christine Tan =

Filipino religious leader and activist (1930–2003)

Mary Christine Tan RGS
- Mother Superior
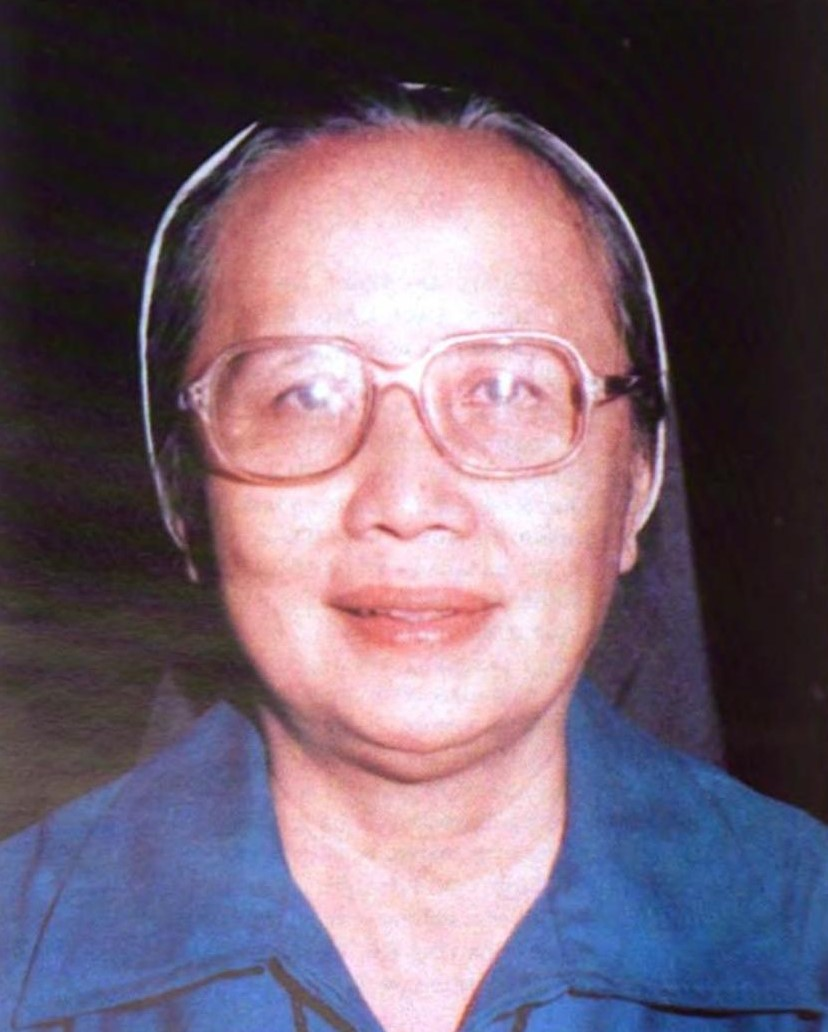
- Tan from the Official Directory of the Constitutional Commission, c. 1986

Personal details
- Born: Amanda Limgenco Tan; November 30, 1930 Manila, Philippine Islands
- Died: October 6, 2003 (aged 72) Metro Manila, Philippines
- Denomination: Roman Catholicism
- Parents: Bienvenido Tan, Sr. Salome Limgenco
- Occupation: Nun of the Religious of the Good Shepherd (RGS); Founder, Association of Major Religious Superious of Women (AMRSP)
- Education: Tertiary (Bachelor of Science in Mathematics)
- Alma mater: St. Scholastica's College, Manila

Member of the Philippine Constitutional Commission
- In office June 2, 1986 – October 15, 1986
- President: Corazon Aquino

Amanda Limgenco Tan, RGS (November 30, 1930 – October 6, 2003), best known as Mary Christine Tan, was a Filipino missionary, nun, and activist, known for her opposition to human rights abuses during the Martial Law era. She led the Association of Major Religious Superiors of Women (AMRSP) from 1973 to 1976, a group of nuns who opposed the Martial Law dictatorship of Ferdinand Marcos, and worked to alleviate poverty in the country. Tan, along with eight other nuns, is collectively referred to as the Bantayog sisters for their resistance against the Ferdinand Marcos regime.

== Personal life ==
Tan was born as Amanda on November 30, 1930, in Manila, Philippines, to Bienvenido A. Tan Sr., a judge of the RTC Manila Branch, and Salome Limgenco, a housewife. She is the fifth of seven siblings: Consuelo, Bienvenido Jr. (who became a member of the Agrava Commission and later the Ambassador of the Philippines to Germany), Teresita, Caridad, Leticia, and Angeles. Tan attended St. Scholastica's College in Manila, where she earned a Bachelor of Science in Mathematics. She later joined the Religious of the Good Shepherd (RGS) and adopted the name by which she is commonly known today.

She spent the first 16 years of her religious life in the convent, becoming the first Filipino head of the RGS's Philippine Province. Her niece, Didith Rodrigo, in an interview with Tan, described her as feeling joy when helping others. Tan described these years as somewhat placid:

"[I couldn't] recall a single sorrow or problem or even joy that made any dent to the core of my being."

She and other nuns lived in poverty to uphold their vows seriously.

== Role in Martial Law ==
During Martial Law, Tan was a vocal activist advocating for democratic rights. Tan and the AMSRP members asserted liberation and respect for human rights along with "a weekly compilation of news suppressed by the martial law government". She was one of the co-heads of the organization alongside priests Benigno Mayo and Lope Castillo.. Despite disapproval from the Catholic Church, she persisted in her political activism. Tan lived in poverty in the Leveriza slum for 26 years, fighting for freedom.

In a 1981 interview with the New York Times, she revealed that her house was raided and an arrest warrant was issued for her at the start of Martial Law. She also noted the increasing progressiveness of Filipino women in their outlook on life.

In 1984, Tan co-founded the Alay Kapwa Christian Community with five other RGS nuns to assist impoverished communities in Cavite, Quezon, and Cebu provinces.

== After martial law and legacy ==
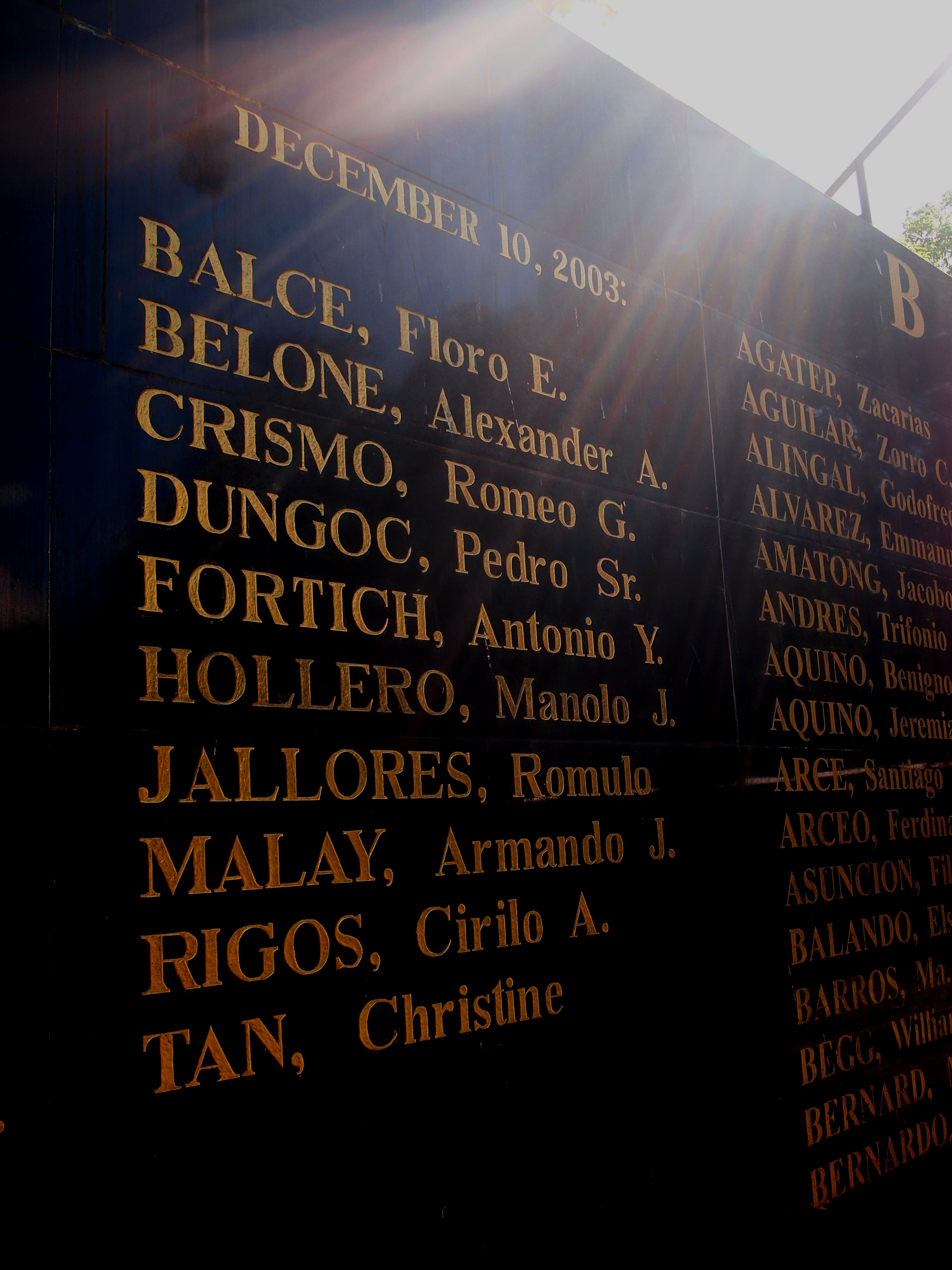
Detail of the Wall of Remembrance at the Bantayog ng mga Bayani, displaying names from the 2003 batch of Bantayog Honorees, including Mary Christine Tan.

After the People Power Revolution in 1986, Sister Christine was appointed to the Philippine Constitutional Commission of 1986 by President Corazon Aquino to ensure representation of the poor in drafting the new constitution. In the 1990s, she gained recognition as a famous critic of successive presidential administrations, from Aquino to Estrada. Sister Christine also served on the Board of Directors of the Philippine Charity Sweepstakes Office in 1998, where she advocated for fairer distribution of funds.

Her name is inscribed on the Wall of Remembrance at the Bantayog ng mga Bayani, alongside 305 others, in recognition of her role in restoring Philippine democracy. Her work contributed to the reputation of her congregation, the RGS, for charity and religious service. President Aquino praised Tan for embodying values of integrity, patriotism, selflessness, and dedication.

Despite being diagnosed with stomach cancer in 2000, Tan continued to pursue her passions. She expressed her resilience by stating:

"There is an intensity within me to give all of my life to God in any way that evolved—be this with the poor or even through sickness. And in this pouring I shall strive to be poor and pure."

Tan died on October 6, 2003 at the age of 72 (some sources dispute October 7). Her autobiography, focusing on her experience with the RGS congregation and transition from Eastern Spirituality to Social Justice, was published by her brother Bienvenido Jr. four days after her death.

== See also ==
- Bantayog ng mga Bayani
- People Power Revolution
- Religious sector resistance against the Marcos dictatorship
