= Juan A. Marigza =

Juan Bautista Abellera Marigza (June 23, 1929 – September 6, 2018) was a clergyman who served as the 5th elected Bishop of the North Luzon Jurisdiction for the United Church of Christ in the Philippines (UCCP) from 1986 to 1994, best known in the broader public for his many years of opposition to the authoritarian regime of Ferdinand Marcos and environmental and human rights after Marcos was deposed. In the history of Protestantism in the Philippines, he is known for his long tenure as pastor of the UCCP Capitol Church in San Fernando, La Union and of the prominent UCCP congregation in Baguio City.

== Advocacy work ==
During the Marcos dictatorship, Marigza played a leading role in the establishment of the North Luzon Human Rights Organization (NLHRO) and the Baguio Chapter of the Free Legal Assistance Group (FLAG), which defended the many political detainees under the Marcos dictatorship.

After the 1986 People Power revolution, Marigza remained an active voice of social conscience in the Cordillera Administrative Region, speaking against destructive development projects, such as the construction of the San Roque Dam and various open-pit mining projects in Benguet province, as well as oppressive legislation such as anti-terror bill.

== Death and legacy ==
In 2006 the City of Baguio recognized Marigza with the Gintong Tala Award for Religious and Spiritual Service in Baguio City, and the Cordillera Human Rights Alliance (CHRA) awarded him with the Gawad Tanggol Karapatan (Defense of Rights Award) in 2008.

Marigza died on September 6, 2018.

== See also ==
- Isabelo Magalit
- Melba Padilla Maggay
- United Church of Christ in the Philippines
- Free Legal Assistance Group
- Political detainees under the Marcos dictatorship
