= Mary Bernard Jimenez =

Filipina Carmelite (1923–1984)

Mary Bernard Jimenez CM

Personal life
- Born: Virginia Correa Jimenez; April 3, 1923 Sta Ana, City of Manila
- Died: September 11, 1984 (aged 61) Manila, Philippines

Religious life
- Religion: Roman Catholic

Sister Mary Bernard Jimenez, CM (Born Virginia Correa Jimenez, April 3, 1923 - September 11, 1984) was a Filipina Carmelite Missionary and educator known for her humanitarian work with the Task Force Detainees of the Philippines (TFDP). She was one of its earliest volunteers when it was first organized by the Association of Major Religious Superiors of the Philippines in 1974. She eventually became TFDP coordinator for Metro Manila.

== Work with Task Force Detainees of the Philippines ==
She was already 50 years old when she first joined the TFDP, but still managed to be a frequent visitor to the Marcos regime's various detention centers, particularly those at Camp Crame, Camp Bagong Diwa (then called the Bicutan Rehabilitation Center), and the National Penitentiary in Muntinlupa, and even Camp Olivas in Pampanga.

Among the personnel detention camps, she became was known for her "gentle ways and cheerful disposition," helping her convince officials to let her bring food, medicine, and other supplies to political prisoners when they needed it. She also helped many unjustly detained prisoners to finally be released.

And despite the fact that her humanitarian work was motivated by what researcher Mina Roces describes as "a strong sense of justice and a desire to help those who were unfairly treated," rather than by any ideology, she became so beloved among political detainees that they composed songs about her.

== Death and legacy ==
Sister Mary Bernard died of cancer in 1984. After the ouster the Marcos dictatorship during the civilian-led People Power Revolution two years later, she was honored by having her name inscribed at the Wall of Remembrance at the Philippines' Bantayog ng mga Bayani, which honors the martyrs and heroes who resisted the authoritarian dictatorship of Ferdinand Marcos.

== See also ==
- Martial law under Ferdinand Marcos
- Religious sector resistance against the Marcos dictatorship
- Task Force Detainees of the Philippines
