= Soledad Salvador =

Filipino religious worker, activist, martyr (1957–1985)

Soledad Nacional Salvador
- Born: March 8, 1957; Ilocos Norte, Philippines
- Died: August 24, 1985 (aged 28); Bakun, Benguet, Philippines
- Occupation: Activist
- Known for: Bantayog ng mga Bayani Wall of Remembrance

Soledad Nacional Salvador (March 8, 1957 – August 24, 1985) was a religious worker and activist in the Philippines who fought against the dictatorship of Ferdinand Marcos and was violently murdered. She fought for indigenous people's rights to their land.

== Early life and education ==
Salvador was born in 1957 into a family in Ilocos Norte who had worked for generations as tenant farmers. She found work as a housemaid and then as a parish worker. To gain an education, fellow churchgoers, who were sympathetic to her wish for an education, helped her attend college. She graduated with a bachelor's degree in industrial education but could not get a teaching job after failing a qualification exam, so she took a job in Manila as a maid.

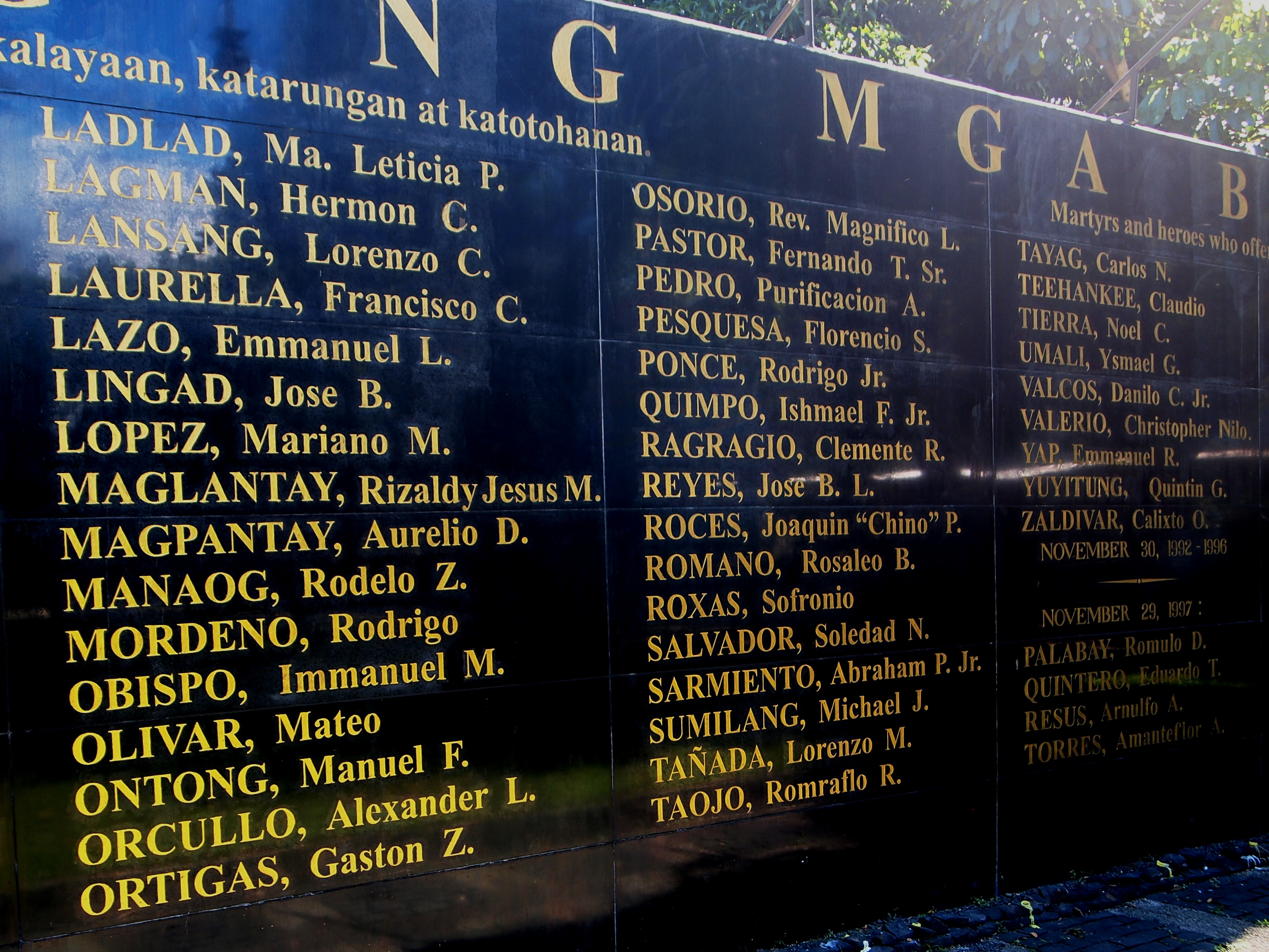
Bantayog Wall listing Soledad N. Salvador

== Political activities ==
Returning to Ilocos Norte, she taught catechism lessons at the Badoc parish church where she saw how "landlessness, militarization and the historical struggle of the Ilokano peasants were all tied up together."

Salvador joined a guerrilla network in 1983 and became involved in anti-dictatorship activities. She was assigned to the hazardous job of carrying messages to the town centers and the villages. Soon, she began to travel with teams of guerillas into the rural terrain to organize residents of the Ilocos and the Cordillera region. Several times she encountered hostile fire but was said to have enjoyed meeting the people living there, especially the women and children, who were surprised to learn she had graduated from college.

== Death ==
On 24 August 1985, her group of armed guerillas was attacked by a military force Bakun, Benguet and she was beheaded along with two other people: Fr. Nilo Valerio and Resteta Fernandez. The relatives of the three martyrs tried to locate their bodies, but they were never found.

== Legacy ==
Her name is inscribed on the Bantayog ng mga Bayani Wall of Remembrance, a memorial that honors martyrs and heroes who fought the dictatorship. It is located in Quezon City, Philippines.

== See also ==
- Bantayog ng mga Bayani
- Religious sector resistance to Ferdinand Marcos's dictatorship
