= Movement of Attorneys for Brotherhood, Integrity, and Nationalism =

Movement against Human Rights abuses

The Movement of Attorneys for Brotherhood, Integrity, and Nationalism, better known by its acronym "MABINI", was a human rights lawyers' organization which worked on countering varied abuses against human rights and civil liberties during the Marcos dictatorship.

After Marcos was deposed by the civilian-led 1986 People Power revolution, numerous members of MABINI joined the government to promote their advocacies, including Rene Saguisag, who became a senator; Fulgencio Factoran, who became Secretary of the Department of Environment and Natural Resources; Joker Arroyo, who became Executive Secretary and later also became a senator; Jejomar Binay, who became Mayor of Makati and eventually became Vice President of the Philippines; and Augusto “Bobbit” Sanchez, who became Labor secretary. Others, like labor lawyer William Chua, remained in private law practice, but continued to pursue various public interest cases.

Sanchez and Chua were posthumously honored at the Philippines' Bantayog ng mga Bayani Memorial, which honors the martyrs and heroes who resisted the abuses of Ferdinand Marcos' authoritarian regime.
