= Human rights abuses of the Marcos dictatorship =

Nationwide repression in the Philippines from 1965–1986

The dictatorship of 10th Philippine president Ferdinand Marcos in the 1970s and 1980s is historically remembered for its record of human rights abuses, particularly targeting political opponents, student activists, journalists, religious workers, farmers, and others who fought against his dictatorship. Based on the documentation of Amnesty International, Task Force Detainees of the Philippines, and similar human rights monitoring entities, historians believe that the Marcos dictatorship was marked by 3,257 known extrajudicial killings, 35,000 documented tortures, 737 'enforced disappearances', and 70,000 incarcerations.

Some 2,520 of the 3,257 murder victims were tortured and mutilated before their bodies were dumped in various places for the public to discover - a tactic meant to sow fear among the people, which came to be known as "salvaging". Some victims were also subjected to cannibalism.

== Political detention ==
The implementation of Martial Law in September 1972 began with a wave of arrests, targeting anyone who opposed Marcos. This included students, opposition politicians, journalists, academics, and even religious workers, aside from known activists. Those who were captured were referred to as "political detainees," rather than "political prisoners," with the technical definitions of the former being vague enough that the Marcos administration could continue to hold them in detention without having to be charged.

=== Warrantless arrests ===
Victims were raided and arrested in their own homes without warrants, and illegally detained without charges or clear information about the status of their case. Arrest, Search and Seizure Orders (ASSO) did not undergo its usual bureaucratic process and at times were merely lists of people to be arrested. Because of the lack of prior investigation, military men could insert names in the list of people to be arrested.

== Torture ==
Torture was instrumental in the Martial Law rule. Young officers, some of them freshly graduated from the military academy, participated in the torture of political dissidents, suspected communists. The ‘top two’ torturers, Col. Rolando Abadilla and Lt. Rodolfo Aguinaldo were allegedly trained by CIA operatives in the United States. Various torture methods had physical, psychological, and sexual natures, many of them meant to degrade the victim. Even dissenters from high-level government officers, such as Sen. Ninoy Aquino and Sen. Ramon Mitra were detained and tortured with solitary confinement. Torture methods were used by the military to threaten, interrogate, or simply hurt detainees, as most of them released without being charged of anything. Sixto Carlos Jr., an activist and professor who was arrested in 1979 and tortured, was among the martial law victims who disappeared but managed to eventually be released. Many of the ‘salvaged’ bodies dumped in public view bore intense torture marks, instilling fear about what happens to those who oppose the Marcos regime.

== Notable murders ==
- Fr. Zacarias Agatep. Fr. Agatep was a seminarian in Northern Luzon. He served as the chaplain of the Federation of Free Farmers, helping organize cooperatives, raising awareness about land reform and campaigned for the reduction of land rent. He took up the cause of the farmers and began to support the fight against the dictatorial regime. He was arrested on charges of subversion and illegal possession of firearms, and later released due to Pope John Paul II's visit. In 1982, he was murdered, claiming he died during an encounter with constabulary soldiers.
- Senator Ninoy Aquino. On August 21, 1983, Aquino was assassinated on the tarmac of Manila International Airport.
- Lorena Barros. ‘Lorrie’ Barros founded the all-women Makibaka (Malayang Kilusan ng Bagong Kababaihan) and became its first chairperson. Barros was a university teacher who published poetry and essays, and later became involved with political activism after exposure to problems in rural areas. She was one of the 63 student leaders who were charged with subversion. She was captured, and was able to escape a year later. In 1976, she was wounded in an armed encounter with constabulary soldiers. She was promised medical treatment if she cooperated with them, but she refused. She was shot in the nape at 28 years.
- NPA Commander Alex Boncayao. Boncayao was an official of the Communist Party of the Philippines and the New People's Army.
- Macli-ing Dulag. Dulag was a leader of the Butbut tribe of the Kalinga province, best known for his leadership in the opposition against the Chico River Dam Project. The project would have destroyed ancestral lands and displaced thousands of indigenous peoples. Dulag organized peace councils to stimulate dialogues, but after the proclamation of Martial Law, he was incarcerated for two months as a suspected ‘subversive’. Upon his release, he continued organizing Kalingas and Bontocs in their opposition to the project. He was assassinated by military forces in April 1980.
- Dr. Juan Escandor. Dr. Escandor was a cancer specialist who was a founding member of the student movement Kabataang Makabayan. He went underground during Martial Law. The official autopsy declared that he died from gunshot wounds, but his body showed signs of extreme torture.
- Fr. Tulio Favali. He was an Italian priest evangelizing in Mindanao when he was murdered by the Manero brothers and their associates, who were known for their killing sprees as members of paramilitary units. The brothers burned his motorcycle, then shot the priest on the head over and over, causing his skull to crack open. They then picked his brains to display to the horrified witnesses.
- Resteta Fernandez. Fernandez was a social worker in depressed areas of Cavite and Tondo. During Martial Law, she became a clandestine youth organizer in Isabela. She was arrested in 1980 for rebellion, insurrection and subversion, spent two years in prison. When she was released, she returned her political commitment in the underground, until she was killed by constabulary soldiers in Benguet. Her head was decapitated and displayed on a pole for the public to see.
- Zoilo Francisco. In August 1979, Francisco was arrested in Brgy. Doña Anecita, Pambujan, Northern Samar. He was decapitated by elements of the 60th PC Battalion, and his stomach slashed open.
- Liliosa Hilao. She was a student activist from Pamantasan ng Lungsod ng Maynila. She was 21 years old when she was arrested and tortured to death in 1973. She was the first detainee to be killed during Martial Law.
- Antonio "Tonyhil" Hilario. He was an engineering student at the University of the Philippines and began discussion groups under the UP Nationalist Corps. He took many countryside rips as part of the group's learning-from-the-masses program. During the First Quarter Storm, he was heavily injured but the experience encouraged him to continue fighting for his convictions. He was a founding member of the Samahang Demokratiko ng Kabataan (SDK), a youth group that moved into the forefront of the student movement. In 1971, he was charged with subversion along with other student activists. The following year, SDK when underground. He worked with the underground movement to organize communities in Manila and later in Panay island. Two years later, he was killed while in a meeting in a remote village in Aklan Others say he was buried alive.
- Evelio Javier. He was a lawyer and provincial governor in Antique who was a close friend and supporter of later President Corazon Aquino. He was gunned down near the New Capitol building.
- Edgar Jopson. “Edjop” was a graduate of the Ateneo de Manila University and a labor rights activist. He was arrested and tortured in 1979 until he was able to escape and go into hiding. Military men later found him and sought to take him into custody, but he was shot before he could escape.
- Emmanuel "Eman" Lacaba. “Eman” was a writer, poet, essayist, playwright, and activist. He was murdered by paramilitary forces in Davao in 1976.
- Jose B. Lingad. He was a lawyer and politician from Pampanga. In 1972, Lingad, a member of the political opposition against Marcos, was among the first political figures to be arrested and imprisoned on the day martial law was declared. On December 16, 1980 in the morning, Lingad was shot by Sgt. Roberto Tabanero in a gasoline station in San Fernando, Pampanga while buying a pack of cigarettes.
- Silver Narciso. On February 10, 1979, he was arrested by the Constabulary in Bgy. Hitalinga, Artacho, Eastern Samar, interrogated about the presence of NPA rebels, tortured, slashed with a knife, died with 9 wounds and both ears chopped off.
- Soledad Salvador. Salvador worked as a parish worker in Ilocos Norte. Growing up poor, she experienced firsthand the peasant struggles of landlessness and militarization. She joined the guerrilla network in 1983 and was tasked to pass messages between town centers and villages. Salvador was killed by the military in a raid in Benguet. She was decapitated, with her head displayed in a sitio. Her body was never found.
- Noel Cerrudo Tierra. Tierra was a student from the University of the Philippines when he joined the U.P. Student Council Nationalist Corps and SDK (Samahan ng Demokratikong Kabataan). He was captured by soldiers in 1974, and shot dead a month later. His corpse bore torture marks.
- Nilo Valerio. Fr. Valerio was assistant parish priest in Abra, Northern Luzon. During Martial Law, residents faced constant threats of displacement due to mining concessions granted to Marcos associate Herminio Disini. In 1979, villagers organized to fight for their indigenous rights and their livelihoods. Fr. Valerio primarily urged them to exhaust legal means of negotiation against the powerful corporation. The Military suspected that he was a leader of rebellious villagers, which drove him to take refuge in Manila. He later returned in Abra and neighboring Cordillera provinces, where he was killed by soldiers. Along with Resteta Fernandez and Soledad Salvador, he was decapitated, with his head attached to poles and paraded around several villages.
- Archimedes Trajano. Trajano was 21 years old when he stood in an open forum in 1977, questioning President Marcos’ daughter Imee about her capability to lead the youth organization Kabataang Barangay. Trajano asserted that she would not be given the position if she were not the President's daughter. He also asked her about her father's role in human rights violations. Witnesses testified that Trajano was forcefully removed from the forum. His blooded body was later found in a street in Manila, carrying signs of torture. Imee Marcos later admitted knowledge of Trajano's torture and murder, and was found guilty by the Hawaii District Court.
- Ishmael Quimpo Jr. ‘Jun’ Quimpo was involved in student demonstrations when he was a student in San Beda High School. He was 14 when he joined he Kabataang Makabayan chapter in his school, and participated in protests. He later enrolled at the University of the Philippines Diliman and participated in community work in squatters areas. He was arrested and detained for 10 days in 1976, for participating in a protest with 5000 informal settlers. He later went underground in the rural areas. He was shot in the back in 1981 in Nueva Ecija.
- Luis Manuel Mijares. ‘Boyet’ Mijares was the son of Primitivo Mijares, the former aide, defector and whistleblower of the Marcos dictatorship. He also wrote the Conjugal Dictatorship, which revealed the misdeeds of the Marcos family and associates. His son Boyet was kidnapped and later salvaged and dumped in public, with visible signs of torture. His eyeballs were protruding, chest stabbed and perforated, his head bashed, and his hands, feet and genitals mangled.

== Massacres ==
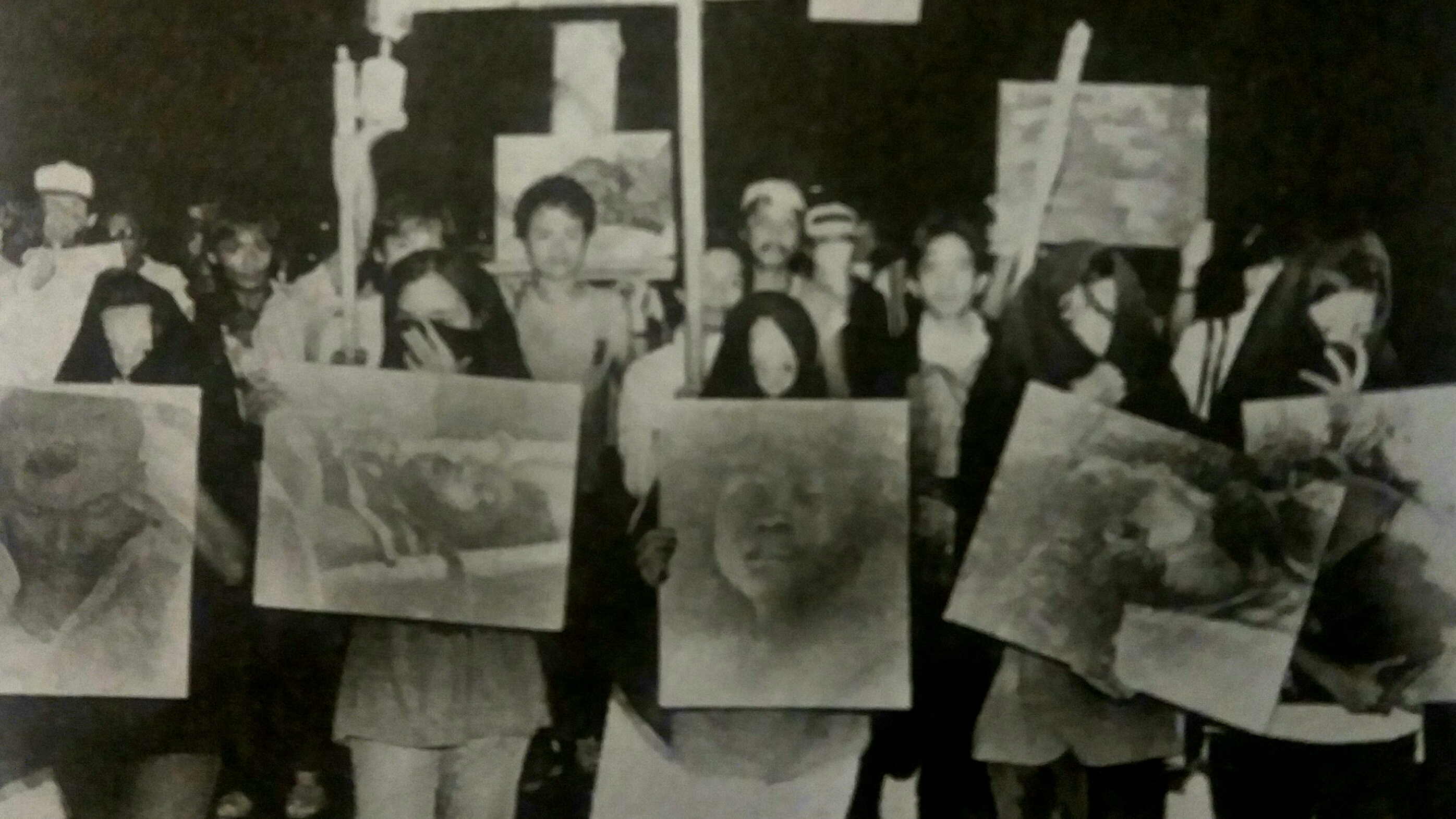
1986 rally against the Marcos dictatorship in which protesters hold up images of Escalante Massacre victims.

Aside from the murder of particular people who opposed the Marcos dictatorship, groups of people were also murdered for collectively mobilizing against the regime. Despite the lifting of Martial Law in 1981, there were five recorded massacres all over the Philippines in the same year alone. Between 1981 and 1982, and there have been 14 recorded massacres, totaling 134 fatalities.

Some civilian massacres include the following.

- Guinayangan, Quezon. (February 1, 1981) - Military elements opened fire on a group of coconut farmers who were marching towards the Guinayangan plaza air to protest the coco levy fund scam. Two people were killed and 27 were wounded.
- Tudela, Misamis Occidental. (August 24, 1981) - Members of a fanatical pseudo-religious paramilitary sect called the "Rock Christ" strafed the house of the Gumapons, a Subanon family, in Sitio Gitason, Barrio Lampasan. 10 of the 12 persons in the house, including an infant, were killed.
- Las Navas, Northern Samar. (September 15, 1981) - Known as the Sag-od massacre, 18 security personnel of Juan Ponce Enrile's San Jose Timber Corporation - who were also members of the Special Forces of the Civilian Home Defense Force (CHDF) allied with a paramilitary group called "the Lost Command" - ordered residents of Barrio Sag-od out of their homes and opened fire. 45 men, women and children were killed, leaving only 13 inhabitants of Barrio Sag-od alive. It was also noted that a majority of the children in the Sag-od massacre died with their mothers while many others were reportedly killed due to their being unable to "stifle their cries of fear and terror" when Special Forces-ICHDF personnel were "marching them off for massacre".
- Culasi, Antique. (December 19, 1981) - Soldiers had warned a group of more than 400 protesters from Culasi's upland Barangays from going through with their protest against high taxes on farm products, and against the stationing of a company of Philippine Constabulary forces in their area. Nevertheless, they persisted. Soldiers opened fire while the protesters were on the bridge, resulting in five farmers killed and several others injured.
- Talugtug, Nueva Ecija. (January 3, 1982) - 5 men in their twenties, suspected to be communist supporters, were rounded up by military elements at around 7pm. Their corpses were found the next day.
- Dumingag, Zamboanga del Sur. (February 12, 1982) - Members of the Christian extremist paramilitary group known as the Ilaga killed 12 persons, allegedly to avenge the death of their leader, who they believed had been killed by the NPA.
- Gapan, Nueva Ecija. (February 12, 1982) - Men in camouflaged uniforms strafed the house of the Bautista, killing the whole family of five.
- Hinunangan, Southern Leyte. (March 23, 1982) - Elements from the 357th Philippine Constabulary company killed 8 people in Barrio Masaymon. 6 of the 8 victims were 3–18 years old, and were thus minors at the time.
- Bayog, Zamboanga del Sur. (May 25, 1982) - 3 people died and 8 people were injured when airplanes dropped bombs on Barangay Dimalinao, allegedly as reprisal for the killing of 23 soldiers by supposed rebels two days earlier. Days later, two more men from the community were picked up and killed. A few months later, the residence of Bayog's Jesuit parish priest was strafed after he had written letters decrying the torture and harassment of the indigenous Subanon people from his parish, whom government had tagged as communist supporters.
- Daet, Camarines Norte. (June 14, 1982) - Known as the Daet massacre, soldiers opened fire on protesters from different barrios who were marching to demand an increase in copra prices, and to denounce "fake elections" and Cocofed. 4 people died on the spot, at least 50 were injured. Two of those who were seriously wounded died two months later.
- Pulilan, Bulacan. (June 21, 1982) - About 24-35 elements of the 175th PC Company raided a house where peasant organizers were meeting. Five of the six leaders were caught and brought to San Rafael, Bulacan, while one was able to escape. By midnight, the bullet-riddled corpses of the five caught leaders were laid out in public in front of the San Rafael municipal hall.
- Labo, Camarines Norte. (June 23, 1982) - Soldiers of the 45th Infantry Battalion's Mabilo detachment gunned down five men, allegedly as revenge for the death of one soldiers' friends at the hands of unidentified gunmen.
- President Roxas, North Cotabato. (April 3, 1985) - A week before the murder of Fr. Tullio Favali, 8 members of a family in Favali's parish, aged 3 to 54, were murdered. Government forces led by Lieutenant Roger Madalugdug and Sergeant Pabela were suspected, but the massacre was never investigated.
- Escalante, Negros Occidental. (September 20, 1985) - In what is now known as the Escalante massacre, members of the Civilian Home Defense Force (CHDF) fired on a crowd of 5000 farmers, students, fisherfolk, religious clergy who had gathered in front of the city plaza to protest the 13th anniversary of Martial Law's imposition. The incident took place on the second day of a planned three-day "Welga ng Bayan" (People's Strike). The CHDF elements, along with about 50 firemen and soldiers of the Regional Special Action Forces (RSAF) had attempted to disperse the crowd. The firemen hosed demonstrators from firetrucks, the RSAF used tear gas, and the CHDF opened fire with assault rifles and a machine gun. Between 20 and 30 people were killed, and 30 were wounded.

=== Massacres targeted at the Moro people ===
The Moro people, belonging to the 14 or so indigenous communities in Mindanao whose populations are mostly Muslim, were specifically targeted by Marcos's forces. The Marcos regime had started to kill hundreds of Moros even before the imposition of Martial Law in 1972. Thousands of Moro Muslims were killed during the Marcos regime, prompting them to form insurgent groups and separatist movements such as the Moro National Liberation Front and the Moro Islamic Liberation Front, which became more radical with time due to atrocities against Muslims.

According to the Marjanie Salic Macasalong's study The Liberation Movements in Mindanao: Root Causes and Prospects for Peace, the number of Moro victims killed by the Army, Philippine Constabulary, and the Ilaga (a notorious government-sanctioned terrorist cult known for cannibalism and land grabbing that served as members of the CHDF) reached as high as 10,000 lives.

Some of these massacres include:

- The Jabidah Massacre (March 1968) - In an incident that took place before martial law, 11 to 68 people killed in the aftermath of an aborted operation to destabilize Sabah, Operation Merdeka. This event is cited as a major incident leading to the formation of the Mindanao Independence Movement, and later the Moro National Liberation Front and Moro Islamic Liberation Front.
- 21 Massacres from 1970 to 1971 which were attributed to pro-government militias like the Ilaga. These massacres resulted in 518 people murdered, 184 injured, and 243 houses burned down.
- The Tacub massacre in Kauswagan, Lanao del Norte (1971) - five truckloads of displaced resident voters were stopped at a military checkpoint in Tacub. People were asked to line up as if in a firing squad, then they were summarily executed in with open fire from armed men. Dozens of bodies were strewn all over the road of the barangay after the incident.
- The Manili massacre (June 1971) - 70-79 people killed inside a mosque, including women and children; the perpetrators were suspected to be members of the Ilaga and Philippine Constabulary.
- The Burning of Jolo (February 7–8, 1974) - land, sea and air bombardment by the Armed Forces of the Philippines caused fires and destruction in the central commercial town of Jolo, killing over 1,000 and possibly up to 20,000 civilians. The April 1986 issue of the Philippines Dispatch described it as "the worst single atrocity to be recorded in 16 years of the Mindanao conflict".
- The Palimbang massacre (September 1974) - about 1,500 male Moros were killed inside a mosque; 3,000 women and children aged 9–60 were detained; and about 300 women raped by members of the Philippine Constabulary.
- The Pata Island massacre (February–March 1981) - 3,000 Tausug civilians, including women and children, were killed by months of Philippine military artillery shelling.
- The Tong Umapoy Massacre (1983) - a Navy ship opened fire on a passenger boat en route to an athletic event in Bongao, Tawi-Tawi. 57 passengers were killed.

== Military units involved ==
Although various human rights abuses were attributed units throughout the Armed Forces of the Philippines (AFP) during the Marcos dictatorship, the units which became particularly notorious for regularly violating human rights abuses were the Intelligence Service of the Armed Forces of the Philippines (ISAFP) under B.Gen Ignacio Paz; the Metrocom Intelligence and Security Group (MISG) under the command of Col. Rolando Abadilla, and the 5th Constabulary Security Unit (5CSU) under the command of Lt. Miguel Aure. An officer of the 5CSU, 1Lt Rodolfo Aguinaldo, eventually became one of the most notorious torturers of the Marcos regime.

The 5CSU and MISG were parts of the Philippine Constabulary (PC) under then-Major General Fidel V. Ramos, a distant relative of Marcos. Both Paz and Ramos answered to Defense Minister Juan Ponce Enrile, who was also a Marcos relative. Aside from human rights abuses, these units also hounded media entities, corporate management, and opposition groups with threats, intimidation, and violence.

The PC and ISAFP were also aided in these activities by the Presidential Security Unit and the National Intelligence and Security Agency (NISA), headed by Gen. Fabian Ver.

The irregular paramilitary forces known as the Civilian Home Defense Forces (CHDF) were supervised and deployed by the heads of the local government in the Philippines such as provincial governors, city and municipal mayors. These paramilitary forces became notorious for various human rights abuses.

== International pressure and knowledge of abuses by Marcos ==
The international community eventually got word of these human rights violations and applied pressure to the Marcos dictatorship to end them. In 1975, Marcos aide and chief propagandist Primitivo Mijares defected from the Marcos dictatorship and revealed in front of US lawmakers that torture was routinely practiced within the Marcos regime. Mijares' admission attracted international criticism, particularly from Amnesty International and Washington. Amnesty International's first report about the Philippines in December 1975 revealed the “systematic and severe torture” handled by the Fifth Constabulary Security Unit (5CSU). Amnesty International found convincing evidence of widespread torture among prisoners, enabled by Marcos's suspension of the writ of habeas corpus and the absence of judicial oversight. Evidence reveals that not only was he aware of tortures and murders enacted by his military and police force, but that he was condoned and at times arranged for it. This caused tensions between the United States and the Philippines, pressuring Marcos to admit human rights violations during his regime.

Marcos initially denied knowledge of human rights violations. In 1974, he proclaimed in a televised address that “No one, but no one was tortured”. But he eventually confessed at the 1977 World Peace through law Conference in Manila that “there have been, to our lasting regret, a number of violations of the rights of detainees”.

== Transitional justice ==
Republic Act (R.A.) No. 10368 was passed by Congress in 2013 to provide reparations and recognition to victims of human rights violations during the Marcos regime. It allocated PHP10 billion from Marcos's ill-gotten wealth to distribute to human rights victims. It also set up a Human Rights Violations Claims Board to facilitate distribution.

R.A. 10368 also created the Human Rights Violations Victims' Memorial Commission "to establish, restore, preserve and conserve a Memorial Museum, Library, Archive and Compendium in honor of the human rights violation victims (HRVVs) during the Marcos regime".

== Marcos family denial ==
Ferdinand Marcos has denied all allegations of his involvement in any human rights extrajudicial killings, enforced disappearances, and arbitrary arrests which were made towards human right violations which occurred during his presidency.

On the stories of human rights abuses, Bongbong Marcos describes them as "self-serving statements by politicians, self-aggrandizement narratives, pompous declarations, and political posturing and propaganda."

His older sister, Imee, denies that their family is responsible for the human rights abuses that occurred during her family's regime and called them political accusations. According to her, "If what is demanded is an admission of guilt, I don't think that's possible. Why would we admit to something we did not do?"
