= Magnifico Osorio =

Filipino Methodist leader

Reverend Magnifico Osorio
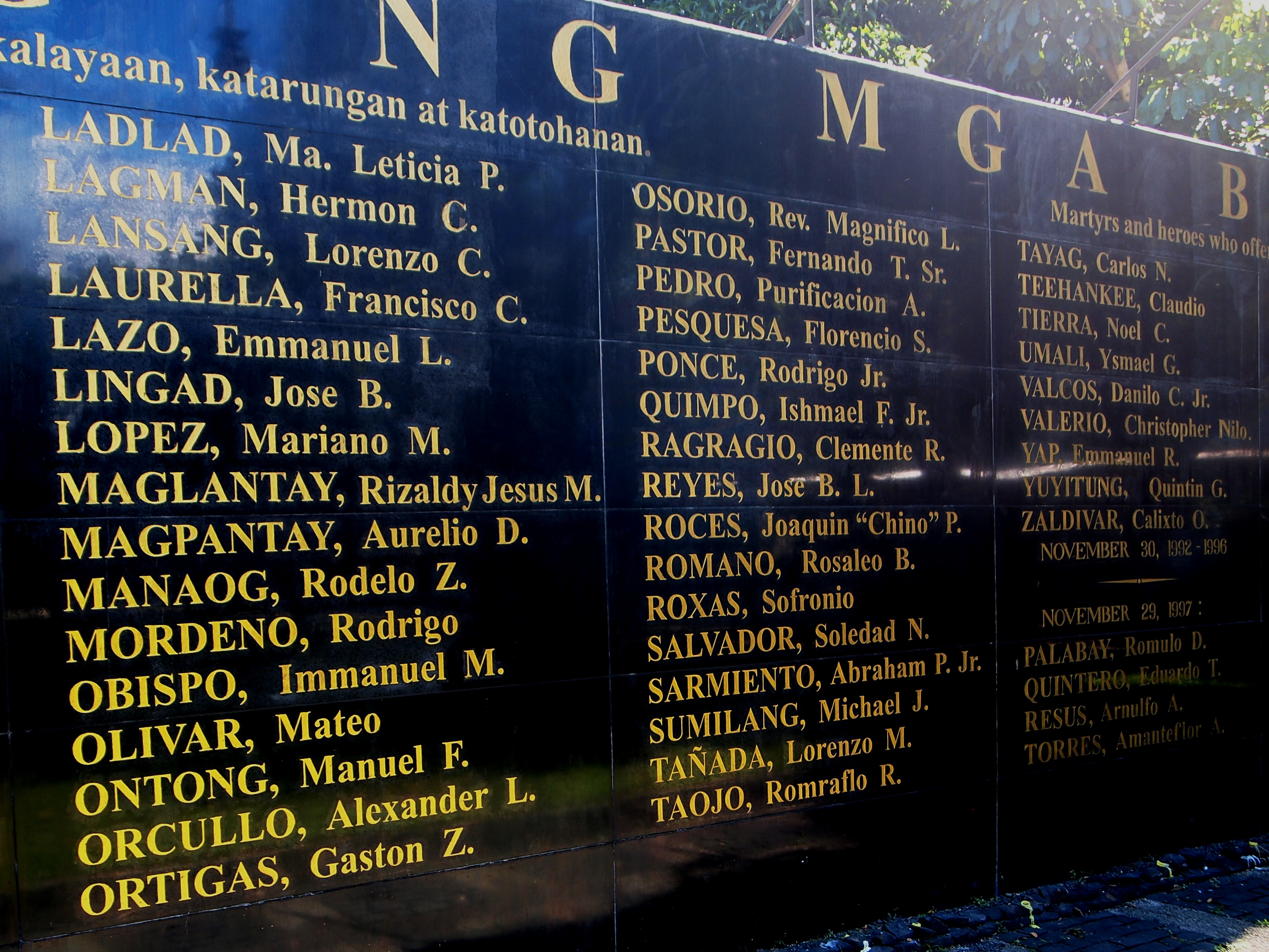
- Detail of the Wall of Remembrance at the Bantayog ng mga Bayani, showing names from the 2014 batch of Bantayog Honorees, including that of Magnifico Osorio.
- Born: Magnifico Libre Osorio; December 15, 1934; Manapla, Negros Occidental, Philippines
- Died: March 29, 1985 (aged 50); Bataraza, Palawan, Philippines
- Cause of death: Assassination
- Spouse: Florenda Osorio

Rev. Magnifico Libre Osorio (December 15, 1934 - March 29, 1985) was a Filipino Methodist Pastor and human rights advocate best known for championing the rights of Indigenous people in the province of Palawan and his murder during the waning days of Ferdinand Marcos' dictatorship in the Philippines. He was not known to have political affiliations nor leanings, but his humanitarian work and the circumstances of his murder have led him to be considered a martyr of the resistance against the dictatorship, and his name is inscribed on the Wall of Remembrance at the Bantayog ng mga Bayani in Quezon City.

Pastor Osorio was one of several preachers or missionaries who were violently killed after opposing forces linked to the Marcos administration in 1985: notable others being Catholic Missionary Priest Tullio Favali, United Church of Christ Minister Elpidio Sumawil, and Episcopalian Father Mariano Beling.

== See also ==
- Bantayog ng mga Bayani
- Religious sector resistance against the Marcos dictatorship
