= Paula Carolina Malay =

Filipino writer and human rights advocate

Paula Carolina Guevara Santos Malay (April 4, 1916 - December 24, 1993), often nicknamed "Ayi", was a Filipino writer and human rights advocate best known for her years of resistance against the authoritarian regime of Ferdinand Marcos, and for various works of which "Nasa Puso ang Amerika," a Filipino language translation of Carlos Bulosan's America is in the Heart. She was married to journalist and activist Armando Malay Sr., with whom she had three children - Armando "Badi" Malay Jr., Carolina "Bobbie" Malay Ocampo, and Ricardo "Dick" Malay - all became prominent activists, writers, and academics in their own right.

Malay was given a Best Translation Award by the Manila Book Circle for "Nasa Puso ang Amerika," and her activism led to her being honored by having name being inscribed on the Philippines' Bantayog ng mga Bayani memorial, which honors the martyrs and heroes who fought the authoritarian regime of Ferdinand Marcos.
