= Juan Escandor =

Filipino Physician

- Born: Juan B. Escandor; November 14, 1941; Gubat, Sorsogon, Commonwealth of the Philippines
- Died: March 31, 1983 (aged 41); Quezon City, Philippines
- Other names: Johnny; Ka Mapalad
- Education: University of the Philippines Manila (BS, M.D.)
- Occupation: Doctor
- Years active: 1971–1983

Juan B. Escandor (November 14, 1941 - March 31, 1983), also known as Johnny, was a Filipino cancer specialist, radiologist, and later a rural doctor. During the period of Martial Law in the Philippines, Escandor went underground and joined the New People's Army. Known for his social work, his torture and death at the hands of METROCOM forces remain one of the most prominent examples of human rights abuses of the Marcos dictatorship.

== Life and career ==
Escandor was born in Gubat, Sorsogon and studied at Gubat National High School before taking up medicine at the University of the Philippines College of Medicine. He graduated in 1969 and began specializing in cancer treatment, eventually becoming the Chief Resident of the Department of Radiology at the Philippine General Hospital. In 1971, Escandor received a Colombo Plan scholarship and was sent to Japan to join the Third Seminar on Early Gastric Cancer Detection. By 1972, Escandor was consultant in the PGH's Department of Radiology in PGH, and eventually, Head of the Research Department of Cancer Institute.

Escandor volunteered in multiple government and non-government organizations to reach out communities in Central Luzon and Mindoro, including the PANAMIN Foundation. He also frequently reached out to urban poor communities around Manila to give check-ups, while also establishing a free clinic in his hometown of Gubat. In 1972, Escandor was active in Operasyon Tulong, bringing medical services to flood victims in Central Luzon.

Escandor was also involved as an activist. He was one of the founding members of Kabataang Makabayan and was active in its workers' bureau. He organized the institutional workers in PGH, as well as working in urban poor communities. In 1969, he was instrumental in establishing the Sorsogon Progressive Movement and the Progresibong Kilusang Medikal in 1970. During the First Quarter Storm, Escandor was at the forefront of mass actions in and around Manila.

Upon the declaration of Martial Law, Escandor left his job at the PGH and went underground, joining the New People's Army. As part of the NPA, he continued his services as a doctor, primarily in serving in rural areas in the Cagayan Valley. The Marcos dictatorship issued a PHP 180,000 reward for his capture, calling him the "NPA doctor."

== Torture and death ==
Escandor and a companion, Yolanda Gordula, were last seen having dinner with friends in Caloocan on March 30, 1983. The exact circumstances of Escandor's death are still unknown, but official accounts state that Escandor was killed in a shoot-out with METROCOM units in Quezon City. Escandor's parents retrieved his remains and brought them home to Sorsogon.

A fact-finding mission led by Dr. Jaime Zamuco and Dr. Corazon Rivero conducted an autopsy on Escandor's body. The autopsy findings showed that his brain had been removed from his skull and shoved into his abdominal cavity, and his skull filled with rags, plastic bags, and a pair of briefs. He also had six gunshot wounds and bore contusions on his body. Gordula, meanwhile, was never seen again.

== Legacy ==
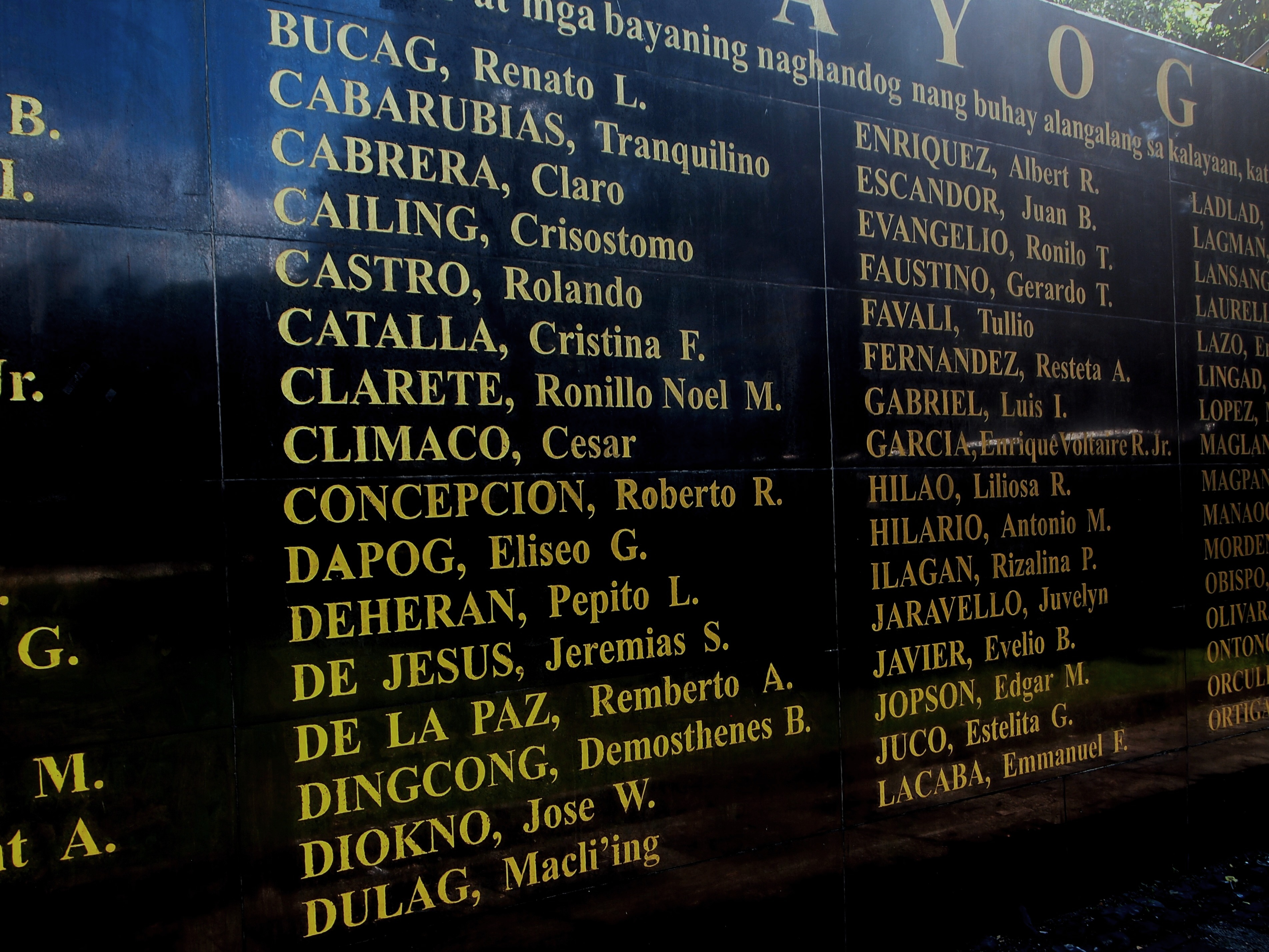
Detail of the Wall of Remembrance at the Bantayog ng mga Bayani, showing names from the first batch of Bantayog Honorees, including that of Juan "Johnny" Escandor.

Mourning Escandor's death, his medical school classmates paid tribute to him saying his death “remind[s] us all that the primary duty of the physician is to heal. And that healing transcends social boundaries and political beliefs.”

Escandor was among the 65 individuals first honored by having his name etched on the wall of remembrance at the Philippines' Bantayog ng mga Bayani, which honors the martyrs and heroes who resisted the authoritarian regime of Ferdinand Marcos.
