= Political detainees under the Marcos dictatorship =

Individuals incarcerated by the Ferdinand Marcos regime

Historians estimate that there were about 70,000 individuals incarcerated by the authoritarian regime of Ferdinand Marcos in the period between his 1972 declaration of Martial Law until he was removed from office by the 1986 People Power Revolution. This included students, opposition politicians, journalists, academics, and religious workers, aside from known activists. Those who were captured were referred to as "political detainees," rather than "political prisoners," with the technical definitions of the former being vague enough that the Marcos administration could continue to hold them in detention without having to be charged.

Most of these political detainees were arrested without warrant, and detained without charges; 11,103 of them have been officially recognized by the Philippine government as having been tortured and abused. They were held in the various military camps in the capital - there were five detention centers in Camp Crame, the three detention centers in Camp Bonifacio, and the New Bilibid Prisons and a detention center in Bicutan all held a large number of prisoners. In addition, there were about 80 detention centers in the provinces, as well as various undocumented military "safehouses" located throughout the Philippines. Four provincial camps were designated as Regional Command for Detainees (RECAD) - Camp Olivas (RECAD I) in Pampanga in Central Luzon; Camp Vicente Lim (RECAD II) in Laguna in Southern Luzon; Camp Lapulapu (RECAD III) in Cebu in the Visayas; and Camp Evangelista (RECAD IV) in Cagayan de Oro City in Mindanao.

Volunteers by the Roman Catholic Church-established Task Force Detainees of the Philippines initially took it upon themselves to document the detention conditions and detainee tortures in the detention centers, and after international pressure, teams from international human rights agencies such as Amnesty International were eventually allowed to conduct their own observation missions.

== Background ==
Marcos began laying the groundwork for Martial Law as soon as he became president in 1965 by increasing his influence over the Armed Forces of the Philippines (AFP). He established close ties with specific officers, took control of the military's day-to-day operationalization by appointing himself concurrent defense secretary in the first thirteen months of his presidency, and soon carried out the "largest reshuffle in the history of the armed forces" when he forcibly retired fourteen of the AFP's twenty-five flag officers, including the AFP Chief of Staff, the AFP Vice Chief of Staff, the commanding general of the Philippine Army, the Chief of the Philippine Constabulary, the commanders of all four Constabulary Zones, and one third of all Provincial Commanders of the PC. Professor Albert Celoza, in his 1997 book on the political economy of authoritarianism in the Philippines, notes that: "It was alleged that a plan of action [for Martial Law] had existed as early as 1965...no one opposed the plan because no one was certain that the plan would be carried out."

In May 1970, the Marcos government picked up the brothers Quintin and Rizal Yuyitung, the controversial publishers of the Chinese Commercial News who dared to question Marcos' policy with regard to Taiwan and the People's Republic of China. The brothers were deported to Taiwan, where Rizal was sentenced to jail for three years and Quintin for two years. The incident became a test case through which Marcos was able to gauge how the public would react to the jailing of journalists.

On August 21, 1971, the Plaza Miranda bombing took place, with grenades thrown into the crowd during a political rally of the Liberal Party at the Plaza Miranda in Quiapo district, Manila. Marcos immediately blamed communists for the incident, and used the bombing to justify his subsequent suspension of the writ of habeas corpus, an act which would later be seen as a prelude to the declaration of Martial Law more than a year later.

At 7:15 p.m. on September 23, 1972, President Ferdinand Marcos announced on television that he had placed the Philippines under martial law, stating he had done so in response to the "communist threat" posed by the newly founded Communist Party of the Philippines (CPP), and the sectarian "rebellion" of the Muslim Independence Movement (MIM). This marked the beginning of a fourteen-year period of one-man rule which effectively lasted until Marcos was exiled from the country on February 25, 1986.

== Warrantless arrests ==
In a document dated September 22, 2023, Marcos issued General Order No. 2 under his newly made-official Martial Law regime - a full day before he would even make the proclamation public. This gave him power to order arrests without undergoing the usual bureaucratic process, and at times the Arrest, Search and Seizure Orders (ASSO) provided were merely lists of people to be arrested.

Because prior investigation was not needed, Marcos' forces could insert names in the list of people to be arrested. Those detained were often not charged or given clear information about the status of their case.

== Human rights abuses ==
The Marcos dictatorship is historically remembered for its record of human rights abuses, and based on the documentation of Amnesty International, Task Force Detainees of the Philippines, and similar human rights monitoring entities, historians believe that the Marcos dictatorship was marked by 3,257 known extrajudicial killings, 35,000 documented tortures, and 70,000 incarcerations. Some 2,520 of the 3,257 murder victims were tortured and mutilated before their bodies were dumped in various places for the public to discover - a tactic meant to sow fear among the public, which came to be known as "salvaging." Some victims were subjected to cannibalism.

Although various human rights abuses were attributed units throughout the Armed Forces of the Philippines (AFP) during the Marcos dictatorship, the units which became particularly notorious for regularly violating human rights abuses were the Intelligence Service of the Armed Forces of the Philippines (ISAFP) under B.Gen Ignacio Paz; the Metrocom Intelligence and Security Group (MISG) under the command of Col. Rolando Abadilla, and the 5th Constabulary Security Unit (5CSU) under the command of Lt. Miguel Aure. An officer of the 5CSU, 1Lt Rodolfo Aguinaldo, eventually became one of the most notorious torturers of the Marcos regime.

The 5CSU and MISG were parts of the Philippine Constabulary (PC) under then-Major General Fidel V. Ramos, a distant relative of Marcos. Both Paz and Ramos answered to Defense Minister Juan Ponce Enrile, who was also a Marcos relative. Aside from human rights abuses, these units also hounded media entities, corporate management, and opposition groups with threats, intimidation, and violence. The PC and ISAFP were also aided in these activities by the Presidential Security Unit and the National Intelligence and Security Agency (NISA), headed by Gen. Fabian Ver.

== Detention centers ==
Political detainees were held in the various military camps in the capital - there were five detention centers in Camp Crame, the three detention centers in Camp Bonifacio, and the New Bilibid Prisons and a detention center in Bicutan all held a large number of prisoners. In addition, there were about 80 detention centers in the provinces, as well as various undocumented military "safehouses" located throughout the Philippines. Four provincial camps were designated as Regional Command for Detainees (RECAD) - Camp Olivas (RECAD I) in Pampanga in Central Luzon; Camp Vicente Lim (RECAD II) in Laguna in Southern Luzon; Camp Lapulapu (RECAD III) in Cebu in the Visayas; and Camp Evangelista (RECAD IV) in Cagayan de Oro City in Mindanao.

=== Camp Crame ===
As the headquarters of the Philippine Constabulary, Camp Crame also became the site of five of the Marcos regime's most infamous detention facilities for political prisoners:

- the Men's Detention Center;
- the Women's Detention Center,
- the PC (Philippine Constabulary) Stockade;
- the MetroCom (Metropolitan Command) Detention Area (RECAD 6); and
- the CIS (Criminal Investigation Service) Detention Area.

Camp Crame was also the site of the Command for the Administration of Detainees (CAD or COMCAD), headed by PC Chief Fidel V. Ramos, which was the agency in charge of giving orders for the arrest and detention of the Marcos regime's political prisoners.

Camp Crame also played the most prominent role in the first batches of arrests during Martial Law. In the hours just before Martial Law was officially announced on the evening of September 23, 1972, the Camp Crame Gymnasium became the site where the first hundred or so political prisoners - those caught from a list of about 400 journalists, educators, politicians, and others on a list of "National List of Target Personalities" who were labeled "subversives" because they had openly criticized Ferdinand Marcos - were brought before they were moved to other facilities such as Fort Magsaysay in Laur, Nueva Ecija or the various detention centers in Fort Bonifacio.

The prisoners brought to Camp Crame included former President Sergio Osmeña's son Sergio Osmeña III, Senators Soc Rodrigo and Ramon Mitra Jr., businessman Eugenio Lopez Jr., teacher Etta Rosales, lawyer Haydee Yorac, and a plethora of writers and broadcasters including Amando Doronila of the Daily Mirror, Luis Mauricio of the Philippine Graphic, Teodoro Locsin Sr. of the Philippines Free Press, Rolando Fadul of Taliba, Robert Ordoñez of the Philippine Herald, Rosalinda Galang of the Manila Times; Ernesto Granada of the Manila Chronicle, Maximo Soliven of the Manila Times, and Luis Beltran and Ruben Cusipag of the Evening News. These early detainees even included eleven opposition delegates from the 1971 Constitutional Convention, including Heherson Alvarez, Alejandro Lichuaco, Voltaire Garcia, Teofisto Guingona Jr., Philippines Free Press associate editor Napoleon Rama, and broadcaster Jose Mari Velez. The Gymnasium facilities were later used as a permanent detention facility, known as the Men's Detention Center.

The PC Stockade is noted as the place where the first death of a student while under government detention took place: Pamantasan ng Lungsod ng Maynila Communication Arts student Liliosa Hilao, who had been brutally tortured before she died.

Others who were detained in Camp Crame at different times during the Marcos dictatorship were writers Luis R. Mauricio and Ninotchka Rosca, Obet Verzola, Dolores Stephens Feria, Boni Ilagan, and Pete Lacaba, among others.

=== Fort Bonifacio ===
When martial law was declared in 1972, Fort Bonifacio became the host of three detention centers full of political prisoners:

- the Ipil Reception Center (sometimes called the Ipil Detention Center),
- a higher security facility called the Youth Rehabilitation Center (YRC), and
- the Maximum Security Unit where Senators Jose W. Diokno and Benigno Aquino Jr. were detained.

Ipil was the largest prison facility for political prisoners during martial law. Among the prisoners held there were some of the country's leading academics, creative writers, journalists, and historians including Butch Dalisay, Ricky Lee, Bienvenido Lumbera, Jo Ann Maglipon, Ninotchka Rosca, Zeus Salazar, and William Henry Scott. After Fort Bonifacio was privatized, the area in which Ipil was located became the area near S&R and MC Home Depot at 32nd Street and 8th Avenue in Bonifacio Global City.

The YRC was a higher security prison which housed prominent society figures and media personalities, supposed members of the Communist Party of the Philippines, and some known criminals. Journalists imprisoned there included broadcaster Roger Arienda, Manila journalists Rolando Fadul and Bobby Ordoñez, and Bicolano journalist Manny de la Rosa. Society figures Tonypet and Enrique Araneta, Constitutional Commission delegate Manuel Martinez, poet Amado V. Hernandez, and Dr Nemesio Prudente, president of the Philippine College of Commerce (now the Polytechnic University of the Philippines), were all also imprisoned at the YRC. So were a number of Catholic priests including Fathers Max de Mesa and Fr Hagad from Jolo, and Jesuit Fr Hilario Lim. The site of YRC was later used as the Makati City Jail.

Senator Benigno Aquino Jr. and Senator Jose Diokno were Marcos' first martial law prisoners, arrested just before midnight on September 22, 1972, and at 1 AM on September 23, 1972, respectively. They were eventually imprisoned in Fort Bonifacio at the Maximum Security Unit separate from the YRC. They stayed there until Marcos moved them to an even higher security facility in Fort Magsaysay in Laur, Nueva Ecija on March 12, 1973. Diokno would remain in solitary confinement at Laur until September 11, 1974, while Aquino would stay in prison until May 5, 1980.

=== Bicutan Rehabilitation Center ===
During the Marcos dictatorship, the site now known as Camp Bagong Diwa was a major detention center for political detainees, known as the Bicutan Rehabilitation Center (BRC). Some of the prominent prisoners kept there at different times including journalist Chelo Banal-Formoso, activist couple Mon and Ester Isberto, and in the aftermath of the September 1984 Welcome Rotonda protest dispersal, Senators Lorenzo Tanada and Soc Rodrigo, and future Senators Tito Guingona, Aquilino Pimentel Jr., and Joker Arroyo.

=== Fort Magsaysay ===
Although not located in Metropolitan Manila, another prominent detention center was Fort Magsaysay in Laur, Palayan, Nueva Ecija. During Martial Law, Senators Jose W. Diokno and Ninoy Aquino were incarcerated in Fort Magsaysay after Marcos declared martial law on September 21, 1972.

=== Camp Panopio ===
Yet another military facility used as a detention center during the Marcos dictatorship was Camp Panopio in Cubao, Quezon City - not far from Camp Crame. Activist Obet Verzola was detained and tortured there before being moved to other detention facilities.

=== Camp Vicente Lim (RECAD I) ===
Camp Vicente Lim in the Canlubang district of Calamba, Laguna was designated as one of the four provincial camps to become a Regional Command for Detainees (RECAD). It was designated RECAD I and it housed thousands of detainees from the Southern Tagalog and Bicol regions.

UP College of Forestry instructor Crisostomo Vilar, who would later become vice mayor of Pagsanjan; and Bohol Chronicle columnist Merlita Lorena Tariman were detained there, as was Feminist activist Lorena Barros later transferred to Ipil Reception Center.

Activists Bal Pinguel, Manuel Bautista, Nick Perez, and Armando L. Mendoza were tortured and detained there until they famously escaped with nine others in 1980 - the first documented successful escape from a Marcos prison. However, many of them were later recaptured or killed.

Some victims, like UPLB Student activist Bayani Lontok, were killed elsewhere and then buried in an unknown grave within the camp.

==== Other detention centers in Southern Tagalog and Bicol ====
There were numerous other detention centers under Camp Vicente Lim's ambit as RECAD I. This included:

- The Army camp in Tigaon, Camarines Sur where UP Engineering student and activist Floro Balce succumbed to his wounds after having been shot elsewhere
- Reagan Barracks (now Camp Ibalon), the military headquarters in Legazpi City, where the student activist pseudonymed as "Gato del Bosque" was detained and tortured.
- Camp Elias Angles in Pili, Camarines Sur
- the Philippine Constabular Batangas Provincial Headquarters at Kumintang in Ilaya, Batangas City where UPLB Student Leader Jose Pacres was detained and tortured.

=== Camp Olivas (RECAD II) ===
Camp Olivas in the City of San Fernando, Pampanga, was designated as one of the four provincial camps to become a Regional Command for Detainees (RECAD). It was designated RECAD I and it housed detainees from Northern and Central Luzon.

Prominent detainees imprisoned there include Edicio de la Torre, Judy Taguiwalo, Tina Pargas, Marie Hilao-Enriquez, and Bernard-Adan Ebuen. Prisoners who were documented to have been tortured include the sisters Joanna and Josefina Cariño, the brothers Romulo and Armando Palabay, and Mariano Giner Jr of Abra.

About 50 Kalinga and Bontoc leaders were also brought to Camp Olivas from their detainment center in Tabuk, Kalinga, arrested for their opposition to the Chico River Dam Project.

==== Other detention centers in Northern and Central Luzon ====
There were numerous other detention centers under Camp Olivas's ambit as RECAD II. This included:

Ilocos Region, Abra, Benguet, and Mountain Province

- Camp Holmes (now Camp Bado Dangwa) in La Trinidad, Benguet, a large facility in which many political prisoners were held, including the family of Ernesto Dog-ah Lacbao, a mumbaki of the Kalanguya people who was imprisoned in response to his resistance to the forced relocation of his village.
- Camp Valentin Juan in Laoag, Ilocos Norte
- The Headquarters of the 138th Philippine Constabulary Company in Marcos, Ilocos Norte in which at least one female prisoner from Santa Cruz, Ilocos Sur is documented to have been raped by a PC captain in 1984.
- Camp Col. Juan Villamor in Bangued, Abra, headquarters of the Abra Constabulary Command where the 123rd PC Company was based.
- a "Camp Diego Silang" located somewhere in Ilocos Sur, (which was different from the Police Camp established in La Union in 1989 which used the same name), where Caoayan, Ilocos Sur parish priest Zacarias Agatep was held before being transferred to bigger facilities at Camp Dangwa.
- Camp Henry T. Allen beside Baguio City Hall, which was the original site of the Philippine Military Academy, which was utilized for housing the surge of political detainees immediately after the declaration of Martial Law in September 1972.
- the Baguio City Jail where Miss World 1967 candidate-turned-activist Maita Gomez was detained for intermittent periods, alternating with detainment in Camp Olivas
- the Pangasinan Philippine Constabulary (PC) Provincial Camp in Lingayen, Pangasinan, which was renamed Camp Antonio Sison in 2017. The camp was so full of political prisoners that the chapel, which measured 4x9 meters, was divided in two by a wall of bars, with one part treated as a jail.

Cagayan Valley Region including Ifugao and Kalinga-Apayao

- Camp Melchor F. dela Cruz in Barangay Upi in Gamu, Isabela in which officers of the Armed Forces Northern Luzon Command were also stationed.
- Headquarters Isabela Province Philippine Constabulary in Barangay Baligatan, Ilagan, Isabela, renamed Camp Lt. Rosauro Toda Jr. in 2020.
- Camp Marcelo Adduru in Tuguegarao City.
- the Philippine Constabulary stockade at Barangay Bulanao in Tabuk, Kalinga, also known as Camp Capt. Juan M Duyan, where about 150 Kalinga and Bontoc leaders, including Butbut tribe Pangat Macli-ing Dulag were detained at various times for their opposition to the Chico River Dam Project.
- the Philippine Constabulary/Integrated National Police camp at Lagawe, Ifugao, later renamed Camp Col. Joaquin P. Dunuan in 2004.
- the Bontoc Province Constabulary Command Barracks in Bontoc, Mountain Province.

Central Luzon

- Camp Servillano Aquino in Tarlac City which was a large facility containing hundreds of prisoners, including political detainees and regular prisoners.
- Camp Macabulos in Barangay Pag-asa, Tarlac City where activist brothers Jovencio, Felix, and Doroteo Abaya Jr. were tortured, and in which the team which killed activist Ed Aquino and his companions in April 1973 were based.
- Various private residences of Government and Military officials - certain low risk political detainees were delegated to a civil relations project which saw them temporarily detained in residences of Government and Military officials in Central Luzon, so that townspeople would see them and be warned not to oppose Martial Law, lest they too become political detainees. Sites included in the program included the house of a Military General in Pampanga, and the house of the Mayor of Guimba, Nueva Ecija, which the detainees noted for its "ostentaneous" luxury and "fleet of servants" during a time when the countryside was full of poverty.

=== Camp Lapu-Lapu (RECAD III) and Camp Sergio Osmeña ===
Camp Lapu Lapu in Cebu City was designated as one of the four provincial camps to become a Regional Command for Detainees (RECAD). It was designated RECAD III, housing prisoners from the Visayas. Nearby Camp Sergio Osmeña was often the place where detainees were brought first, though. They were then moved to Camp Lapu Lapu after a while.

Among the Cebuanos immediately arrested by the Marcos dictatorship when Martial law was announced on September 23, 1972, were columnist and future National Artist Resil Mojares and human rights lawyer and Carcar Vice Mayor Democrito Barcenas, who were both detained at Camp Sergio Osmeña. Also arrested in the first week was Lawyer Meinrado Paredes, who would later become a Regional Trial Court executive judge, was imprisoned at Camp Sergio Osmeña for three months, and then moved to Camp Lapulapu where he would remain for the remainder of the year he would spend as a political detainee. Redemptorist Priest Amado Picardal was also initially imprisoned and tortured at Camp Sergio Osmeña to before he was moved to Camp Lapulapu.

==== Other detention centers in the Visayas ====
There were numerous other detention centers under Camp Lapulapu's ambit as RECAD III. This included:

- Camp Sotero Cabahug in Cebu City, where Aquilino E. Pimentel Jr. was detained along with numerous others including Ribomapil "Dodong" Holganza Sr. and his son Ribomapil "Joeyboy" Holganza Jr., Tony Cuenco, and Nita Cortez Daluz.
- Camp Martin Delgado in the Fort San Pedro area of Iloilo City where Luing Posa-Dominado was detained alongside Judy Taguiwalo and tortured, manhandled, and sexually assaulted Local World War II heroine Coronacion "Walingwaling" Chiva was also detained there for opposing Marcos, although her status as a legendary World War II heroine meant she was mostly not harmed during detention. Labor lawyer Rodolfo Lagoc was also detained there for six months.
- an unspecified military camp in Santa Barbara, Iloilo, where 2Lt Pablo G. Fernandez, who objected to martial law, was detained and summarily executed
- the old Negros Occidental Provincial Constabulary Headquarters (prior to its transfer to its new site in 1974) where the wounded Edgardo Dojillo was brought by the 332nd PC Company, and where he eventually bled to death.
- Camp Dagohoy in Tagbilaran, Bohol, among whose detainees was the 19-year-old brother of Judge Meinrado Paredes, who was beaten with firearms so that he eventually suffered permanent damage to his hearing.
- Camp Lukban in Barangay Maulong, Catbalogan was a Philippine Constabulary camp at the time, and was the site of various human rights violations documented by Amnesty International in 1981. It only became the headquarters of the 8th Infantry Division in 1988 when that unit was transferred from its previous area of operations in Leyte.

=== Camp Evangelista (RECAD IV) ===
Camp Evangelista in Cagayan de Oro City was designated as one of the four provincial camps to become a Regional Command for Detainees (RECAD). It was designated RECAD IV, housing prisoners from Mindanao.

Amnesty International called particular attention to the case of Pastor Romeo O. Buenavidez, a United Church of Christ in the Philippines (UCCP) minister, who was beaten up in various safehouses in August 1981 and then brought to Camp Evangelista where he was forced to sign a waiver indicating he had been "well treated" during his "questioning." Results of later medical examinations showed medical findings matching the beatings he described. A case was filed against the officer and soldiers involved but there had been no updates by the time Amnesty International filed its report.

==== Other detention centers in Mindanao ====
Since Mindanao is a large geographical area, there were numerous other detention centers under Camp Evangelista's ambit as RECAD IV. This included:

- Camp Alagar in Cagayan de Oro City where public school teacher Nicanor Gonzales Jr. was detained for seven months and heavily tortured, leaving an abnormal growth on his skull.
- Camp Abelon in Pagadian City which was the Philippine Constabulary provincial headquarters in Davao del Sur, and where Amnesty International called particular attention to the case of Teodoro Alegado and Epifanio Simbayo, who were noted to have been killed under suspicious circumstances.
- Camp Catitipan in Davao City
- The Philippine Constabulary barracks in Tagum

== Documentation ==
Numerous political prisoners were documented to have been tortured during their detention in Camp Crame, evidence of which was gathered by volunteers by the Roman Catholic Church-established Task Force Detainees of the Philippines and then reported to international human rights agencies such as Amnesty International.

Applying international political pressure on the Marcos administration, three Amnesty International missions were able to speak to political prisoners and release mission reports containing detailed descriptions of specific torture cases. The reports, released in 1974, 1975, and 1981 respectively have since become a major source of historical documentation regarding torture under Ferdinand Marcos' regime.

Accounts were also gathered by the World Council of Churches, the International Commission of Jurists, and other non-government organizations.
