= Camp Vicente Lim =

Philippine National Police camp in Calamba, Laguna

Coordinates: 14°12′53″N 121°07′18″E

Camp General Vicente Lim
- Kampo Heneral Vicente Lim (Filipino)
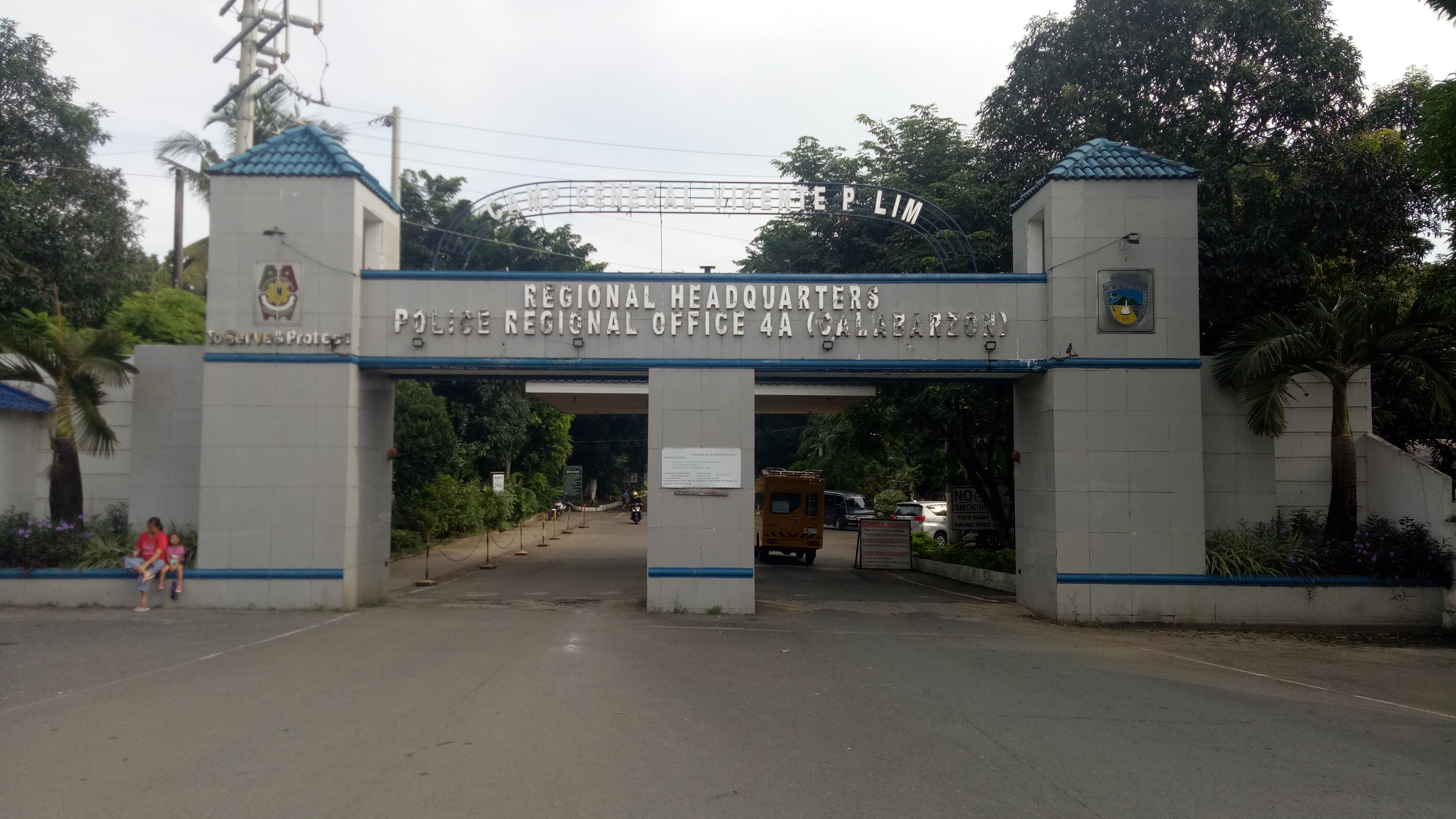
- Camp Vicente P. Lim, Mayapa, Calamba, Laguna
- Interactive map of the Camp General Vicente Lim area

General information
- Location: Calamba, Laguna, Philippines
- Current tenants: PNP CALABARZON
- Named for: Vicente Lim

Camp Vicente Lim is a facility of the Philippine National Police located in Barangay Mayapa in the city of Calamba, Laguna, which currently serves as the regional headquarters of the PNP Calabarzon (Region IV-A). It has played a significant part in the local history of the Calabarzon region, as well as the national history of the Philippines; it was part of the Calamba Airstrip during the American colonial era, and was occupied by the Japanese forces during World War II although it is not recorded as having been used for military purposes during the war. It later became a facility of the Philippines' integrated local police forces, hosting the Integrated National Police Training Command.

During Martial law under Ferdinand Marcos, Camp Vicente Lim was one of the four provincial camps to be designated a Regional Command for Detainees (RECAD). It was designated RECAD I and it housed thousands of political detainees from the Southern Tagalog and Bicol regions.

== Location and facilities ==
Camp Vicente Lim is located along National Highway Mayapa Road.

=== Facilities within the camp ===
The Regional Headquarters also the main Headquarters of Bureau of Fire also inside the Camp Vicente Lim. The National Forensic Training Institute, Bureau of Jail Management Penology, Police National Training Institute also found inside Camp Vicente Lim. There is one multi-purpose gymnasium inside the camp.

=== Residential area ===
There is also a residential area known as Campo by the locals or sometimes "Barangay Camp Vicente Lim," although it technically remains part of Barangay Mayapa. This residential area is divided into six zones: Purok 1, Purok 2, Purok 3, Purok 4, Purok 5 and Purok 6. Some of the landmarks near Camp Vicente Lim are the Iglesia ni Cristo house of Worship, Imall grocery and Department store. The Campo, meanwhile has its own covered basketball court located at purok 4 and the Veterans Hall found in purok 1.

=== Educational facilities ===
There are primary and secondary school building inside the camp: Camp Vicente Lim Elementary School, also known as Post Elementary School; and Camp Vicente Lim Integrated School.

=== Transportation ===
The means of transportation - both inside the Camp premises and in the residential Campo - is by pedicab.

== History ==
=== Calamba airstrip ===
It was also known as Calamba Airstrip or Calamba Airfield since 1922.

=== Marcos dictatorship era detention camp ===
During the Marcos dictatorship, Camp Vicente Lim was designated as one of the four provincial camps to become a Regional Command for Detainees (RECAD). It was designated RECAD I and it housed thousands of detainees from the Southern Tagalog and Bicol regions.

==== Prominent detainees ====
UP College of Forestry instructor Crisostomo Vilar, who would later become vice mayor of Pagsanjan; and Bohol Chronicle columnist Merlita Lorena Tariman were detained there, as was Feminist activist Lorena Barros later transferred to Ipil Reception Center.

Activists Bal Pinguel, Manuel Bautista, Nick Perez, and Armando L. Mendoza were tortured and detained there until they famously escaped with nine others in 1980 - the first documented successful escape from a Marcos prison. However, many of them were later recaptured or killed.

Some victims, like UPLB Student activist Bayani Lontok, were killed elsewhere and then buried in an unknown grave within the camp.

==== Martial law detention centers administered under Camp Vicente Lim ====
There were numerous other detention centers under Camp Vicente Lim's ambit as RECAD I. This included:

- The Army camp in Tigaon, Camarines Sur where UP Engineering student and activist Floro Balce succumbed to his wounds after having been shot elsewhere
- Reagan Barracks (now Camp Ibalon), the military headquarters in Legazpi City, where the student activist pseudonymed as "Gato del Bosque" was detained and tortured.
- Camp Elias Angles in Pili, Camarines Sur
- the Philippine Constabulary Batangas Provincial Headquarters at Kumintang in Ilaya, Batangas City where UPLB Student Leader Jose Pacres was detained and tortured.
