= Zacarias Agatep =

Roman Catholic parish priest

Fr. Zacarias Agatep
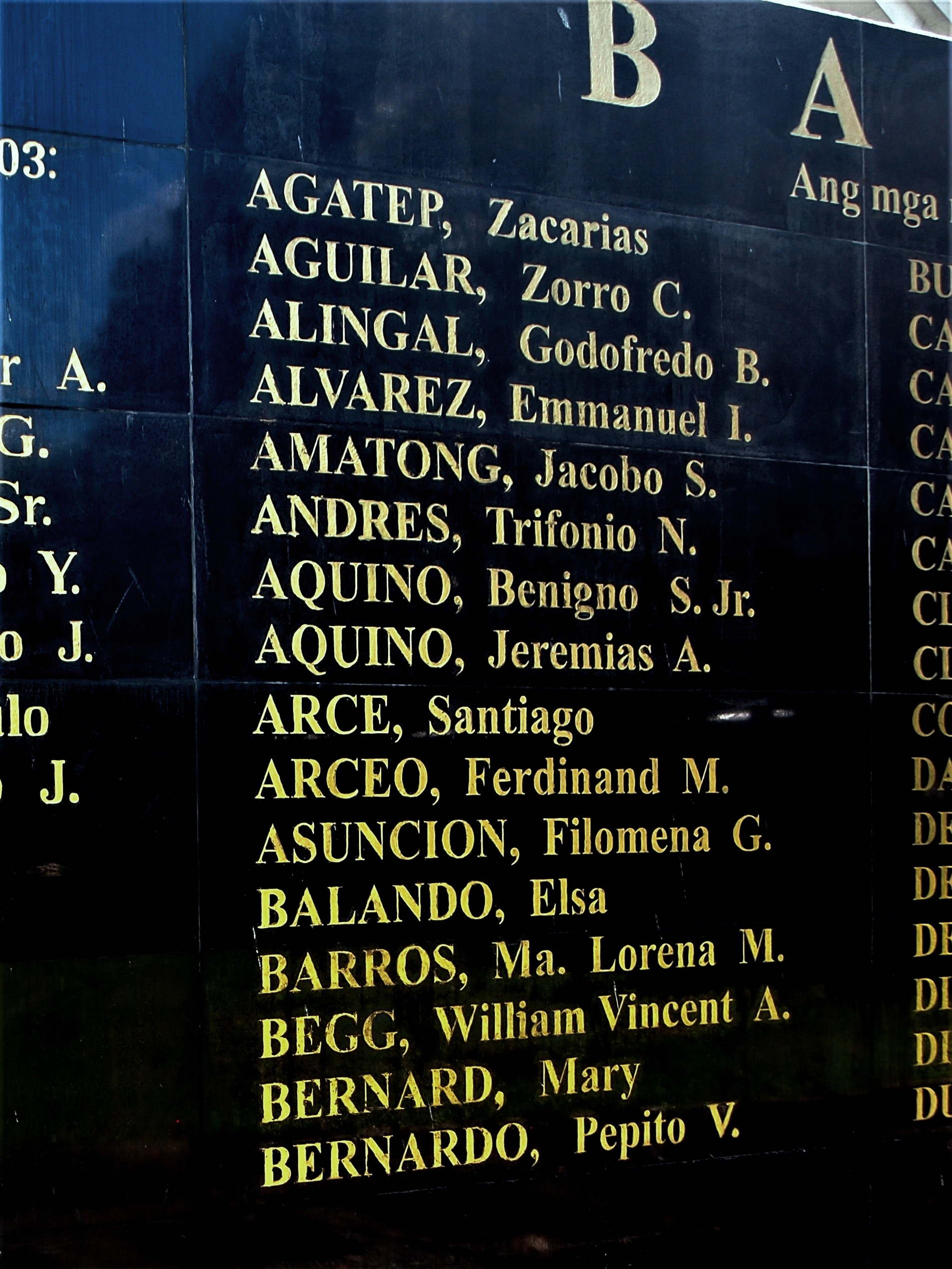
- Detail of the Wall of Remembrance at the Bantayog ng mga Bayani, showing names from the first batch of Bantayog Honorees, including that of Zacarias Agatep.

Personal life
- Born: September 6, 1936 Santo Domingo, Ilocos Sur, Commonwealth of the Philippines
- Died: October 27, 1982 (aged 46) Salcedo, Ilocos Sur, Philippines
- Cause of death: Gunshot wounds
- Known for: Activism against the tobacco industry in Ilocos Sur during the Martial law era.

Religious life
- Religion: Roman Catholic
- Church: Our Lady of Hope Parish (Caoayan, Ilocos Sur)

Father Zacarias Guimmayen Agatep (September 6, 1936 – October 27, 1982), also known by his nickname Apo Kari, was a Filipino Roman Catholic parish priest who was killed for speaking against foreign and local monopolies in Ilocos Sur's tobacco industry during the dictatorship of President Ferdinand Marcos. He has formally been honored as a hero of democracy who fought against the dictatorship, having had his name etched on the wall of remembrance of the Philippines' Bantayog ng mga Bayani.

== Advocacy work ==
As the parish priest of Our Lady of Hope Parish in Caoayan, Ilocos Sur father Agatep helped organize cooperatives, taught interested farmers about land reform, and spoke against foreign and local monopolies in the tobacco industry, which formed the backbone of Ilocos Sur's economy at the time.

== Arrest and release ==
He was arrested for supposed "subversion" in 1980 and was incarcerated for four months until he was released as part of Marcos public relations efforts in preparation for a visit by Pope John Paul II. Upon his release, he famously wrote a letter to the President, decrying what he described as a "frame-up" and lamenting the miscarriage of justice typical under the Marcos administration.

== Death ==
Father Agatep kept speaking out against the abuses of the Marcos administration, and came to be assisted by former Deacon Alfredo Cezar, who became a volunteer at Agatep's parish.

During an early morning meeting in Barangay Baybayading, Salcedo, Ilocos Sur, on October 11, 1982, a group including Cezar and Agatep were ambushed by Marcos administration soldiers. Agatep and Cezar were killed while helping the rest of the group to evade the gunfire. Father Agatep was shot four times in the back.

== See also ==
- Bantayog ng mga Bayani
- Religious sector resistance against the Marcos dictatorship
