= Isabelo Magalit =

Personal life
- Born: Isabelo F. Magalit

Religious life
- Religion: Christianity
- Denomination: Evangelicalism
- Church: Diliman Bible Church

Isabelo F. "Bel" Magalit (1940 – 2018) was a Filipino Evangelical pastor, theologian, and author known as one of the leading people of the Evangelical movement in the Philippines during the country's Martial Law era under President Ferdinand Marcos. Best known as pastor of Diliman Bible Church (DBC), he was also the first Filipino and Asian president of Asian Theological Seminary (ATS).

== Education and early ministry ==
Magalit studied at the University of the Philippines College of Medicine, earning his degree in 1964. After graduating, Magalit served as General Secretary of Intervarsity Christian Fellowship of the Philippines (IVCFP) from 1966 to 1973 and Associate General Secretary in East Asia for the International Fellowship of Evangelical Students (IFES) from 1973 to 1983.

== Career ==
=== 1974 Lausanne Congress representative ===
Magalit was a Philippine representative to the First International Congress on World Evangelization at Lausanne, Switzerland in 1974, where the Lausanne Covenant, an ecumenical confession which has become one of the major documents of modern evangelical Christianity, was signed.

=== During the Marcos dictatorship ===
After Ferdinand Marcos placed the Philippines under Martial Law in 1972, Magalit was one of the few Evangelical leaders who openly questioned Marcos' authority in theological terms, particularly in releasing the 1973 "We Believe" document alongside Rev. Cirilo Rigos of the UCCP Cosmopolitan Church and opposition leader Jovito Salonga.

=== People Power Revolution ===
Magalit prominently led the Diliman Bible Church (DBC) in joining the 1986 People Power Revolution which toppled Marcos, earlier than other churches and organizations such as the Philippine Council of Evangelical Churches.

Magalit's DBC and Melba Padilla Maggay's Institute for Studies in Asian Church and Culture (ISACC) were the main groups that came together to form Konsensiya ng Febrero Siete (KONFES). It was one of the early groups to man the barricades at Gate 2 of Camp Aguinaldo, which the Marcos military had identified as an entry point for storming the camp.

Magalit's essay "Rightful Rule: Romans 13 for the Philippines Today" is noted as an important examination of the People Power Revolution from the perspective of evangelical theology.

=== Asian Theological Seminary President ===
From 1989 to 2005, Magalit served as president of Asian Theological Seminary (ATS), the first Filipino and Asian to hold the position. In light of his theological scholarship and his ministry leadership, he was chosen as ATS president even without a seminary degree.

== Death ==
Isabelo Magalit died in 2018.

== See also ==
- Melba Padilla Maggay
- Jovito Salonga
- People Power Revolution
