= Task Force Detainees of the Philippines =

Human rights organization in the Philippines

The Task Force Detainees of the Philippines (TFDP) is a non-profit, national human rights organization based in Manila, Philippines. It documents human rights violations, assists victims and their families, organizes missions, conducts human rights education work, campaigns against torture, and promotes advocacy for Human Rights Defenders and Environmental movement. It joined a large coalition called the JAJA or Justice for Aquino, Justice for All in 1983.

== Activities under the Marcos dictatorship ==
TFDP was established in 1974 by the Association of Major Religious Superiors in the Philippines (AMRSP). Its first chairperson was Fr. Mel Brady, Chairman of the Canon Law Committee of the Catholic Bishops' Conference of the Philippines (CBCP). The courageous Franciscan nun Sr. Mariani Dimaranan, SFIC, led the organization for 21 years, including the entire 14-year dictatorship of the late Ferdinand Marcos.

The organization is mainly credited for its staunch human rights practice and advocacy. The late dictator Marcos had filled the country's prisons and military camps with political prisoners, mostly student and peasant protesters, members of left organizations and political opponents. Many were tortured, some murdered.

TFDP undertook the difficult task of documenting human rights abuses by the regime. It built a network of nuns, priests and lay persons, including released political detainees and their relatives, for this sensitive work. TFDP volunteers visited prisons, hospitals and even morgues in the course of documenting abuse cases. They organized missions to exhume bodies and interview residents of terrorized communities. They sought refuge for people at risk of arrest or harm. They sometimes performed personally dangerous feats, such as securing documents in their own bodies. Hundreds were trained to become paralegals in support of TFDP's documentation work.

Another of TFDP's pioneering work involved supporting productive work inside prisons, in particular arts and craft, thus helping in the promotion of prison art under the dictatorship. TFDP volunteers brought art materials to the prisoners, and took out their finished products and helped market them.

It also ran other programs including a scholarship fund for families of political detainees, a fund to promote livelihood projects of released prisoners, and a small loans program to help families of prisoners cope with the day-to-day survival.

It released updates about arrests and releases, and alerts on missing individuals. Its publications include TFDP Update, Lusong, Pumipiglas, Trends, Political Detainees Quarterly Report, and Political Detainees Update. These publications were distributed worldwide, helping call attention to the state of political repression in the Philippines, and giving political detainees and their families a platform to publicly express their demands and experiences.

For legal support and assistance, TFDP worked closely with lawyers connected with the Free Legal Assistance Group (FLAG), another group that saw birth during the Marcos dictatorship, and was organized and headed by nationalist lawyer Sen. Jose W. “Ka Pepe” Diokno. Individuals working against the Marcos regime and its repressive policies were urged to always carry with them a FLAG handbook of rights, bearing telephone numbers to call in case of need.

== Public support and international reception ==
Funding for the Task Force initially came from its mother organization, the AMRSP. Eventually more funds poured in as solidarity for the Philippine human rights movement grew. By 1981, the Task Force was running an annual operation of about 3 million pesos.

Sr. Mariani and other TFDP representatives spoke tirelessly in forums throughout Asia, Europe and the United States, as well as in the United Nations, before the Amnesty International and international meetings, gave interviews, and met with government authorities and funding organizations, in order to spread international awareness about the condition of political prisoners under the Marcos dictatorship.

== After martial law ==
After the Marcos dictatorship was defeated, the Task Force pursued its campaign for human rights under subsequent Philippine administrations. It also expanded advocacy for economic rights, partly by calling against environmental destruction and large-scale mining.

TFDP supports international human rights instruments, such as the UN Universal Declaration of Human Rights, the Declaration on the Right to Development, the multilateral treaty International Covenant on Civil and Political Rights, the multilateral treaty International Covenant on Economic, Social and Cultural Rights, the Convention on the Elimination of All Forms of Discrimination Against Women and the Convention on the Rights of the Child.

== Notable volunteers ==
- Sister Mariani Dimaranan, S.F.I.C. (February 1, 1925 – December 17, 2005) - headed TFDP for twenty-one years, starting in 1973 after she was herself wrongfully detained.
- Sister Mary Bernard Jimenez, C.M. (Born Virginia Correa Jimenez, April 3, 1923 - September 11, 1984) - a Carmelite Missionary who was one of the earliest volunteers to join TFDP, and eventually became TFDP coordinator for Metro Manila.
- Sister Violeta Marcos, AMP (born Maria Remedios Sebastian Marcos; July 18, 1937 – April 30, 2001) was the co-founder and first director of the Augustinian Missionaries of the Philippines, who first opposed martial Law dictatorship of Ferdinand Marcos through diocesan social action involvements in Negros Occidental, and then later joined TFDP.
- Rizaldy Maglantay - A student leader at the National College of Business Administration who eventually became a TFDP volunteer in Aklan after the death of close friend Diore Mijares. Murdered on August 3, 1985 and eventually honored at the Philippines' Bantayog ng mga Bayani as a martyr in the resistance against the authoritarian regime.
- Albert "Abet" Enriquez - A student council leader at Luzonian University in Quezon Province, Enriquez volunteered with TFDP to document human rights abuses in the province of Quezon, and later also became secretary of the Lucena City chapter of Bagong Alyansang Makabayan. He also assisted human-rights lawyers Joker Arroyo, Wigberto Tañada and Ed Abcede in a court case involving local political detainees. He was disappeared on August 29, 1985, shouting that he had been taken by the Military while he was being abducted by armed men.
