= Religious sector resistance against the Marcos dictatorship =

Opposition in the Philippines, 1960s-1980s

Religious sector opposition against the dictatorship of President Ferdinand Marcos included leaders and workers belonging to different beliefs and denominations.

== Christian ==
Many of these leaders and workers belonged to the Catholic Church in the Philippines, to which belonged the majority of the Philippine population at the time. But various opposition efforts were also notable in both the mainline and the evangelical Protestant traditions.

=== In the Catholic Church ===
In the early years of the Marcos administration before the declaration of Martial Law, the poverty and inequality in Philippine society had already begun sparking debates among Catholic theologians about how the church ought to respond. The Second Vatican Council had just concluded in December 1965 and Liberation theology was becoming increasingly influential. Some priests wanted to be more directly involved in activism and with activist organizations resisting the Marcos dictatorship, while those who were more conservative preferred that the pursuit of "the prophetic challenge of the gospel" be "without any ideological affiliation."

The reason why the Catholic Church's participation was restricted in Philippine society was because of internal conflicts, oppositions, and the lack of financial resources and personnel. However, after World War II, there was a need to reconstruct the country by addressing its needs. Therefore, the church's teachings encouraged people to take a more active role in advocating for social justice and helping the poor. This initiative led to the rise of new organizations that aimed to champion social justice and fight against poverty. In addition, these organizations, including the church, opposed Ferdinand Marcos Sr.'s western-influenced leadership, which involved social injustice, a disregard for human rights, and restrictions on the freedom to spread the teachings of God.

After the declaration of Martial law, the Marcos dictatorship's abuses - particularly extrajudicial killings and forced disappearances - convinced a small but very vocal number of the church workers to fight the dictatorship by actively joining underground resistance movements, while the majority resisted within the ordinary means available to then through their office, such as those who formed the human rights monitoring organization Task Force Detainees of the Philippines, or of Manila Cardinal Jaime Sin and Infanta Bishop Julio Labayen, who described their high level engagement with Marcos as "critical collaboration."

After the ouster and exile of the Marcoses in 1986, there began to be less space for activists in the Church, and engagements between church workers and activist organizations went into decline.

In a 2021 international conference held in Taiwan, Daniel Franklin E. Pilario of the Congregation of the Mission presented a paper on a Philippine experience, noting among others that the implementation of the politics of fear and terror present in populist regimes is the same style of governance found in the country; later, because of his mentions of extrajudicial killings during the Marcos dictatorship and the Rodrigo Duterte presidency, he was called an anti-EJK priest.

=== Among the Protestant denominations ===
While Protestants represented a much smaller portion of the Philippine population in relation to Catholics during the 1970s, there were significant opposition movements within the various Protestant denominations, whether mainline or evangelical.

Among the mainline Protestant denominations, there were significant opposition movements within the Philippine Independent Church, the United Church of Christ in the Philippines, and the United Methodist Church in the Philippines.

Because evangelical denominations tend towards locally independent congregations and are thus less centralized, the most prominent evangelical opposition was in organizations like the Institute for Studies in Asian Church and Culture and individual congregations like the Diliman Bible Church, and among the evangelical Pentecostal churches, the Foursquare Church in Romblon. The Institute for Studies in Asian Church and Culture and the Diliman Bible Church played a key role in the formation of the Konsensiya ng Febrero Siete (KONFES) coalition which mobilized evangelicals during the 1986 People Power revolution.

=== Government Justifications and the Church ===
The Marcos government justified the imposition of martial law by citing an actual insurrection and rebellion by armed groups seeking to overthrow the government, including the insurgency of the Communist Party of the Philippines and its armed wing, the New People's Army. The proclamation also referred to plans for sabotage, bombings, and assasinations. Other reasons given included Muslim separatist unrest in the south, urban disorder, student demonstrations, and labor strikes, as well as incidents such as the 1971 Plaza Miranda bombing, which Marcos blamed on communists and used to justify suspending the writ of habeas corpus. Responsibility for the bombing has never been conclusively established.

The reported ambush of Defense Secretary Juan Ponce Enrile on September 22, 1972 was also used to justify the declaration. Marcos' own diary entry for that date described the incident as making martial law a necessity. Marcos based the proclamation on his authority under the 1935 Constitution.

Church leaders had been wary of communism since World War II, and Catholic and Protestant leaders initially showed goodwill toward the regime. However, as church-sponsored work among the poor increasingly came to be viewed by the government as subversive, relations deteriorated. The government and military also viewed Basic Christian Communities as subversive, partly because some communities had come under the influence of the Communist Party of the Philippines and the New People's Army.

== Muslim ==
Muslim Filipinos had been targeted by repressive policies of the Marcos Administration since even before the imposition of Martial Law in 1972, with the Jabidah Massacre of 18 March 1968 being a watershed moment for discontent. The Muslim Independence Movement (MIM) was formed two months later on 1 May 1968, although it was sidelined only five months later when its leader, former Cotabato governor Datu Udtog Matalam, joined the Marcos Administration as Adviser on Muslim Affairs. Although the MIM failed to gain the support of the Muslim masses, President Marcos used its existence (along with that of the recently formed Communist Party of the Philippines) as one of the reasons for proclaiming Martial Law on 23 September 1972. In December 1972 the MIM ceased to exist when Matalam surrendered to Marcos, although a splinter group, the Moro National Liberation Front, had earlier formed in October 1972.

== Indigenous faiths ==
Religious beliefs of indigenous Filipinos also factored into their opposition against the Marcos dictatorship, the most popular example being the Kalinga and Bontoc peoples' resistance against Marcos' Chico River Dam Project in Luzon, in no small part because ancestral lands are sacred in their belief systems. The subsequent assassination of the Kalinga Butbut tribe Pangat (elder) Macli-ing Dulag on 24 April 1980 led to the first major news story coverage critical of Marcos administration policies during Martial Law, dealing a severe blow to the public relations efforts of the Marcos regime.

== Religious publications ==
Upon the declaration of martial law, the government closed down or took over newspapers, magazines, radio stations, and television stations. Only news organizations owned or taken over by relatives or cronies of Ferdinand Marcos were allowed to reopen.

However, underground publications were established and a few independent publications were later able to operate. The Association of Major Religious Superiors of the Philippines (AMRSP) came out with a weekly mimeographed publication called Various Reports, which printed stories on military atrocities and other human rights violations. It printed limited copies distributed among the religious community. In 1975, AMRSP began publishing Signs of the Times, which printed stories on the La Tondeña strike in October 1975, the first big strike to defy martial law. Circulation of Signs grew from a handful to thousands of copies. Its last issue was published on November 26, 1976, before its offices were raided by the military.

== Major events ==
=== Before the declaration of Martial Law ===
- December 30, 1965 - Ferdinand Marcos is sworn in as the tenth president of the Philippines, under the Third Republic.
- May 21, 1967 - A demonstration conducted by Lapiang Malaya sect ends in a violent dispersal attempt by the Philippine Constabulary, killing 33.
- March 18, 1968 - The Jabidah Massacre, where 68 Muslim members of a secret commando unit recruited by the Armed Forces of the Philippines are killed when they refuse further training.

=== After the declaration of Martial Law ===
- August 24, 1974 - The Sacred Heart Novitiate of the Society of Jesus in Novaliches is raided by the military, who were allegedly searching for Communist Party of the Philippines leader Jose Maria Sison. Jesuit priest Jose Blanco is arrested as a suspected rebel.
- May 12–13, 1975 - The Episcopal Commission on Tribal Filipinos of the Catholic Bishops' Conference of the Philippines helped organize bodong (peace pact meeting) involving 150 Bontoc and Kalinga leaders and Catholic Church-based support groups, at St. Bridget's School in eastern Quezon City. The Quezon City bodong resulted in an agreement (Pagta ti Bodong) which united the Bontoc and Kalinga people in opposition against the Chico River Dam Project, which would have submerged sacred tribal lands, and the Marcos Administration, which was pushing for the project to push through.
- April 24, 1980 - Macli-ing Dulag, Pangat (elder) of the Butbut tribe of Kalinga, is assassinated for his resistance efforts against the Chico River Dam Project
- January 17, 1981 - As a public relations move – partly in light of the visit of Pope John Paul II to the Philippines, and partly in light of the upcoming inauguration of United States President Ronald Reagan – Ferdinand Marcos issues Proclamation No. 2405, formally lifting the state of Martial Law nationwide. He nonetheless retained most of his powers as dictator, including "the right to suspend the writ of habeas corpus for crimes related to subversion, insurrection, rebellion, and also conspiracy to commit such crimes."
- February 17–22, 1981 - Pope John Paul II makes his first apostolic visit to the Philippines. He declares in a speech that "Even in exceptional situations that may at times arise, one can never justify any violation of the fundamental dignity of the human person or of the basic rights that safeguard this dignity."
- February 22, 1986 - Speaking on Catholic Church-owned Radio Veritas, Cardinal Jaime Sin, the reigning Archbishop of Manila, broadcasts an appeal urging Filipinos to peacefully gather on EDSA to protect forces that had defected from the Marcos government.
- February 26, 1986 - From Clark Air Base, the Marcos family and a select group of close followers, leave the country for exile in Hawaii.

== Martyrs and Heroes honored at the Bantayog ng mga Bayani ==
Religious leaders and workers represent a significant portion of the names inscribed on the memorial wall of the Bantayog ng mga Bayani (Memorial of the Heroes) along Quezon Avenue, which honors the "Martyrs and Heroes" who resisted the Marcos dictatorship.

=== Zacarias Agatep ===
Nicknamed "Apo Kari", Zacarias Agatep (6 September 1936 – 27 October 1982) was the parish priest of Our Lady of Hope Parish in Caoayan, Ilocos Sur. Agatep helped organize cooperatives, taught interested farmers about land reform, and spoke against foreign and local monopolies in the tobacco industry, which formed the backbone of Ilocos Sur's economy at the time. He was arrested for supposed "subversion" in 1980 and was incarcerated for four months until he was released as part of Marcos public relations efforts in preparation for a visit by Pope John Paul II. Upon his release, he famously wrote a letter to the President, decrying what he described as a "frame-up" and lamenting the miscarriage of justice typical under the Marcos administration. He kept speaking out against the abuses of the Marcos administration until he was shot four times in the back by unidentified gunmen in October 1982.

=== Godofredo Alingal ===
Nicknamed "Father Ling" by his parishioners, Godofredo Alingal (24 June 1922 – 13 April 1981) was a Jesuit priest and journalist who spoke out against repression and militarization under Marcos' Martial Law on the prelature's radio station, DXBB, and its newsletter, An Bandilyo. He was also instrumental in the formation of a credit union and grains marketing cooperative for farmers, and helped organize the Kibawe, Bukidnon chapter of the Federation of Free Farmers. When the government shut down DXBB, he kept his parishioners informed through a "blackboard news service" — one of the more inventive forms that the Philippines' "Mosquito Press" took while traditional media outlets were shut down under martial law. He was shot by an unidentified gunman on 13 April 1981.

=== Amada Alvarez ===
Amada "Madge" Alvarez began her career as a staff writer of Cor Manila, the newsletter of the Archdiocese of Manila. She then served as a community organizer at the Our Lady of Fatima Parish in Highway Hills in Mandaluyong City, under the parish's Basic Christian Communities (BCC) program. Because her interactions with the urban poor communities made her more aware of the social ills under Marcos' Martial Law regime, she eventually joined the Christians for National Liberation (CNL), a group which was aligned with the National Democratic Front. She was killed in Infanta, Pangasinan with five local residents in 1989, after peace talks between the Communist Party of the Philippines and the Government of the Philippines had broken down two years earlier in the wake of the Mendiola Massacre.

=== Trifonio N. Andres ===
"Ponyong" Andres (18 October 1953 - 17 August 1983) was a Catholic seminarian at the St. Francis Xavier Seminary in Davao who volunteered to document human rights violations in Davao for Task Force Detainees of the Philippines and the Citizen's Council for Justice and Peace. He was abducted in Libungan, Cotabato and brought to the Davao Metropolitan District Command Center (Metrodiscom) in Digos, Davao del Sur, where he was tortured and later executed on 17 August 1983.

=== Jeremias Ancheta Aquino ===
A priest of the Iglesia Filipina Independiente, Jerry Aquino (1 June 1949 – 14 December 1981) was a member of the Student Christian Movement of the Philippines and of Christians for National Liberation. In 1977-1978 he was director of the Ecumenical Center for Development, and missionary priest of the Philippine Independent Church's Diocese of Greater Manila. In 1978, he became the program coordinator and youth director of the Philippine Independent Church's Laoag (Ilocos Norte) diocese, and concurrent associate rector of Pagudpud, Ilocos Norte. It was during this posting that was arrested in September 1979, in Sadanga, Mountain Province. He and several companions were held at the Philippine Constabulary stockade in Bontoc, then transferred to the Bicutan jail in Metro Manila. After prolonged fasting and hunger strikes to protest prison conditions, he was released on 24 December 1980, part of a series of prisoner releases meant to generate positive press in light of the arrival of Pope John Paul II in Manila two months later. Upon release, he helped found the Freedom Shop, a carpentry shop for unemployed former political prisoners. He died in a "suspicious" vehicular accident on 14 December 1981.

=== Filomena Asuncion ===
A deaconess of the United Methodist Church in the Philippines, Liway Asuncion (30 March 1954 – 25 June 1983) was a graduate of BA in Christian Education at Harris Memorial College, before returning to her home congregation in Isabela to serve as Christian education and music director, teaching Sunday school, conducting Bible studies, leading the church choir, and becoming president of the district-wide United Methodist Youth Fellowship. In 1979, Asuncion joined an ecumenical movement of Catholics and Protestants called Timpuyog Dagiti Iglesia (Ilocano for "Fellowship of the Churches"), which sought to address the plight of exploited farmers in Isabela, where land ownership was monopolized by a few elite families. In 1981 she was among those arrested at a farmers' protest rally in Ilagan and jailed from April to October. Upon her release, she joined the revolutionary underground and worked full-time in organizing the local farmers in defense of their rights. Witnesses said she was captured alive by government forces in 1983 and was then maltreated and abused before being killed.

=== Santiago Arce ===
A farmer who also served as a lay worker for the parish of Peñarrubia, Abra, Santiago Arce (May 1, 1937 - September 7, 1974) joined the Federation of Free Farmers (FFF) in the early 1970s and later became the FFF provincial coordinator for Abra, conducting seminars and organizing local cooperatives while working towards tenancy system reforms in the province. Having irritated local authorities, Arce was framed, tortured, and killed by the dictatorship's forces in a Constabulary camp in Bangued, Abra. His death was widely mourned by the people of Abra, with Twenty Abra priests concelebrating his funeral mass, classes in Catholic schools all over Abra suspended as a mark of mourning, and his funeral procession becoming "the longest and biggest ever recorded at the time" in Abra, all despite the fear perpetuated by the dictatorship's forces.

=== Pepito Bernardo ===
A priest who was originally assigned to serve the Dumagat communities in Nueva Ecija, Pepito Bernardo later joined the Episcopal Commission on Tribal Filipinos and served as coordinator for the Sierra Madre area of the Rural Missionaries of the Philippines. He had also joined the activist organization Christians for National Liberation. His missionary work was interpreted by Marcos' forces as suspicious, so Fr. Bernardo was detained and tortured several times during Martial Law. He was killed in a traffic accident in San Leonardo, Nueva Ecija in 1985, in circumstances which his companions thought suspicious, but which the authorities never investigated.

=== Romeo Guilao Crismo ===
As executive secretary of the United Methodist Youth Fellowship, Romeo Crismo (8 December 1955–[disappeared] 12 August 1980) was instrumental in organizing the Protestant youth sector to resist the policies and programs of the dictatorship. Supporting himself by teaching, he also worked with the Student Christian Movement of the Philippines, the National Council of Churches in the Philippines, and the Christian Conference of Asia.

=== Mariani Dimaranan ===
Mariani Dimaranan (February 1, 1925 - December 17, 2005) was a Franciscan nun best known for leading the Task Force Detainees of the Philippines for 21 years, including the entirety of the 14-year Marcos dictatorship. Dimaranan led the Manila-based non-profit national human rights organization in documenting human rights violations, assisting victims and their families, organizing missions, conducting human rights education work, campaigning against torture, and promoting advocacy for Human Rights Defenders.

=== Joe Dizon ===
An activist Catholic priest, Jose Dizon (September 29, 1948 – November 4, 2013), led protest actions against government corruption and human rights abuses during martial law in the Philippines, political dynasties, and the pork barrel system. At protest rallies against the Marcos dictatorship, he would say mass to prevent violent dispersal by the government and to boost the morale of demonstrators. He actively campaigned for honest elections and helped form people's organizations in rural areas to support those dealing with land grabbing, military abuses, and hamletting. He died of complications from diabetes at the National Kidney and Transplant Institute on November 12, 2013, at the age of 65.

=== Tullio Favali ===
A Catholic missionary priest sent by the Pontifical Institute for Foreign Missions, Tullio Favali (10 December 1946 – 11 April 1985) was the first foreign missionary to be killed during the years of the Marcos dictatorship. While serving as a parish priest in La Esperanza, Tulunan, Cotabato, Favali was called by the townspeople for help after the Marcos government's paramilitary forces, led by Edilberto, Norberto Jr., and Elpidio Manero, shot the town's tailor. When the Manero brothers saw him arrive and enter a house, Norberto Jr. dragged his motorcycle and set it on fire. When Favali hurried out after seeing the fire, Edilberto shot the priest point-blank in his head, trampled on his body and fired again. This caused the priest's skull to crack open, and Norberto Jr. picked at the brains and displayed them to horrified witnesses. The brothers, along with a few other gang members, stood by laughing and heckling.

=== Oscar D. Francisco ===
Oscar "Oca" Diamaro Francisco (February 10, 1946 - August 15, 2010) - A graduate of the Mapua Institute of Technology who eventually worked for the Archdiocese of Manila's National Secretariat for Social Action and the Ecumenical Movement for Justice and Peace (EMJP), Oca Francisco played a key role in developing the concept of Basic Christian Community-Community Organizing (BCC-CO), a program of the Catholic Church in the Philippines which became an important means by which Filipino Catholics, priests and laity alike, could work to counter the abuses of the Marcos dictatorship. Among the many figures in the resistance to the dictatorship, he is often said to have had the widest network of contacts, since he was able to interact with resistance figures across the political spectrum, and from activists in the poorest Philippine Barangays to lobbyists in international fora involved in the international fight against the dictatorship.

=== Inocencio T. Ipong ===
A Catholic lay worker with the Rural Missionaries of the Philippines (RMP), "Boy" Ipong (28 December 1945 – 21 November 1983) was the son of migrants from Bohol who settled in North Cotabato, so he felt drawn to the plight of poor peasants in the Visayas and Mindanao. Wanting to help them, he joined the youth organization Khi Rho, and later the Federation of Free Farmers. When Martial Law was declared in 1972, he began working as a lay assistant at the RMP with its vision of a "free, just, peaceful, and egalitarian society." In 1982, he was abducted and illegally detained at the Metropolitan District Command Headquarters and at Camp Catitipan in Davao City. He was tortured by his captors who wanted him to admit that he was a certain "Enciong" the military was looking for. His family and his coworkers at the Rural Missionaries of the Philippines spent ten days looking for him and upon finding him, successfully negotiated his release. On November 20, 1983, he was among a group of 12 religious and laypeople who were going to Cebu to attend a seminar, on board the M/V Cassandra. A passing typhoon caused the ship to sink, drowning over 200 passengers in the waters off Surigao, including everyone from Ipong's group.

=== Bishop Julio Xavier Labayen ===
Julio Xavier Labayen (23 July 1926 – 27 April 2016) was a Catholic bishop. Ordained to the priesthood in 1955, Labayen served as Bishop of the Territorial Prelature of Infanta from 1966 until 2003. He was the first Filipino Carmelite bishop when he was ordained on 8 September 1966 and the second bishop of the Prelature of Infanta. He was a staunch defender of human rights, especially during the years of the Martial Law in the Philippines, being known to be one of the "Magnificent 7" who voiced their opposition against the Marcos regime. In recognition of his efforts against authoritarian rule, his name was inscribed on the Wall of Remembrance at the Bantayog ng mga Bayani in 2016. Aside from this, the bishop served as chair of the CBCP's National Secretariat for Social Action-Justice and Peace (NASSA).

=== Bishop Juan Marigza ===
Bishop Juan Bautista Abellera Marigza was a clergyman of the United Church of Christ in the Philippines (UCCP) known in the history of Protestantism in the Philippines for his long tenure as pastor of the UCCP congregation in Baguio City. In the broader public, he is well known for his many years of opposition to the authoritarian regime of Ferdinand Marcos and his role in catalyzing the establishment of the North Luzon Human Rights Organization (NLHRO) and the Baguio Chapter of the Free Legal Assistance Group (FLAG). He remained an active voice of social conscience until his death on September 6, 2018, speaking against destructive development projects, such as the construction of the San Roque Dam and various open-pit mining projects in Benguet province, as well as oppressive legislation such as anti-terror bill.

=== Violeta Marcos ===
Ma. Violeta Marcos (July 18, 1937 - April 30, 2001) was a Catholic nun who was best known as the co-founder and first director of the Augustinian Missionaries of the Philippines (AMP) and for her contributions to the resistance against the Marcos dictatorship and Martial Law - first through her diocesan social action involvements in Negros Occidental, and later as part of the human rights organization Task Force Detainees of the Philippines (TFDP).

=== Bishop La Verne D. Mercado ===
La Verne Diwa Mercado (December 1921-July 2003) was a Bishop of the United Methodist Church, who also served for 14 years as secretary-general of the National Council of Churches in the Philippines (NCCP), from 1973 to 1987. He is known for his effective use of diplomacy to unite NCCP member-churches and to advocate for human rights and for the active involvement of Christians in social issues. He died of natural causes in July 2003.

=== Nicky Morales ===
Nicasio "Nicky" Morales (May 1, 1955 - November 1, 1999) - A consumer rights activist based in the Philippines before 1980, Nicky Morales went into exile after becoming the subject of an Arrest, Search and Seizure Order (ASSO) after the administration became irked by a protest action of an organization he founded, the Samahan ng mga Manggagawang Konsumer (SAMAKO), at the Araneta Colliseum for Labor Day, 1979. He then joined the Church Committee for Human Rights Campaign in the Philippines (CCHRP), a United Church of Christ organization headed by Dr. Dante Simbulan Sr., in lobbying for the US to end its military aid to the Philippines.

=== Rodrigo Mordeno ===
Rodrigo Mordeno (January 1, 1955 - August 7, 1982) - Santa Josefa, Agusan Del Sur citizen Rodrigo Mordeno had only been working a few weeks as area coordinator of the relief and rehabilitation program the St. Joseph the Husband of Mary Parish Church in his hometown when he was killed by rifle-wielding gunmen. The exact motives for his killing were not definitively determined, but several different military units were based in the town at the time, and a group of human rights workers had recently visited to investigate the conditions in the strategic hamlet the dictatorship forces had established in the town.

=== Mateo Olivar ===
Mateo "Tiyong" Olivar (September 13, 1950 - November 7, 1985) was a church worker in the Community-Based Health Program and Family Life Apostolate of the Diocese of Pagadian in Zamboanga del Sur. Known by his nickname "Tiyong," he spent a lot of time in communities in the countryside, the Marcos forces suspected him as a revolutionary organizer. On November 7, 1985, he was assassinated by three unidentified assailants near a military checkpoint in Labangan, Zamboanga del Sur. On the day of his burial, the bishop of Pagadian decreed that Tiyong's funeral mass would be the only mass celebrated in the diocese on that day. His was among the first 65 names to be inscribed at the Bantayog ng mga Bayani's Wall of Remembrance when it was first inaugurated.

=== Magnifico Osorio ===
Magnifico L. Osorio (December 15, 1934 - March 29, 1985) was a Methodist Pastor and human rights advocate best known for championing the rights of indigenous people in the province of Palawan and his murder during the waning days of the Marcos dictatorship. He was not known to have political affiliations nor leanings, but his humanitarian work and the circumstances of his murder have led him to be considered a Martyr of the resistance against the dictatorship, and his name is inscribed on the Wall of Remembrance at the Bantayog.

=== Fernando Tayao Pastor, Sr. ===
A preacher of the Church of Christ denomination, Fernando Pastor Sr. (25 May 1956 - 8 February 1986) had also served as Captain of Barangay Rizal, in the Municipality of Diffun, Quirino. As such, he was one of those community leaders who were forced to keep silent about the abuses under Orlando Dulay, who had been constabulary commander, governor, and assemblyman of Quirino province. When snap presidential polls were called in 1985, Pastor decided to campaign for Corazon Aquino, and eventually became the provincial vice-chair of the United Nationalist Democratic Organization (UNIDO). This displeased Dulay, who was the provincial coordinator of the Marcos political party, Kilusang Bagong Lipunan (KBL). On the eve of the 1986 snap elections, Pastor, his oldest son Fernando Pastor Jr. and colleague Francisco Laurella were walking on their way home when they were abducted by Dulay himself and two of his men. They were taken to Dulay's residence and kept inside a van for three days. The tortured and mutilated bodies of the younger Pastor and Francisco Laurella were found near a ravine three days later, and that of the elder Pastor five days after. It took four years before Dulay was eventually caught and charged in 1990, and was sentenced to life imprisonment by the Quezon City regional trial court.

=== Reynaldo Robles ===
Reynaldo Laminaria Robles (February 9, 1947- September 6, 1977) - Robles was a chemical engineer who chose to volunteer instead with "Action Leaven," a community program of the Archdiocese of Manila. He eventually joined the Kilusang Kristiyano ng Kabataang Pilipino (KKKP) and later, Christians for National Liberation (CNL). When Ferdinand Marcos declared Martial Law in 1972, even religious organizations were banned as long as they had political overtones, but Robles continued his community organizing and thus became a political detainee in 1973. He briefly worked for a youth program of the National Council of Churches in the Philippines, but decided to leave the capital and buy a farm in the town of Gloria, Oriental Mindoro instead. Growing popular in the community there, Marcos' forces in the province became suspicious of him. He was assassinated one day while boiling bananas for breakfast.

=== Roberto Salac ===
Roberto Salac (March 29, 1951 - May 19, 1987) was originally assigned to head the parish of Monkayo, Compostela Valley under the Prelature of Tagum, he was strongly influenced by Liberation Theology and the teachings of the Second Vatican Council and eventually became the Davao del Norte Chair of the Ecumenical Movement for Justice and Peace (EMJP), working with colleagues such as Sr. Consuelo Chuidian. Put in danger by the EMJP's work of exposing human rights violations linked to militarization in Laac, Compostela Valley, however, he was forced to choose between exile or joining the underground resistance against the Marcos dictatorship. There he helped organize people's strikes (called "Welgang Bayan") to call for oil price rollbacks, to protest the murder of journalist Alex Orcullo, to call for the end of militarization and political killings, and for the end of the dictatorship in general. He bled to death after being shot in the knee by rightwing elements which remained in the mountains of Mindanao a month after the People Power revolution.

=== Cardinal Jaime Sin ===
Cardinal Jaime Sin (31 August 1928 – 21 June 2005) was elevated to the College of Cardinals in 1976, having been enthroned as the 30th Archbishop of Manila in 1974, succeeding Cardinal Rufino Santos. He quickly became an influential voice in Philippine national life, frequently issuing statements regarding political developments, the economy, and moral concerns. It was his call on church-owned Radio Veritas for civilians to peacefully assemble at Camp Aguinaldo and Camp Crame along Epifanio De los Santos Avenue that first sparked the 1986 EDSA Revolution, which eventually led to the fall of the Marcos dictatorship. He died on 21 June 2005, aged 76.

=== Nilo Castillejos Valerio, Jr. ===
Nilo Valerio (20 Feb 1950 - 24 August 1985) was a Catholic priest of the Society of the Divine Word assigned to a parish in the upland province of Abra, where he established cooperatives and a school, ministered to remote communities of the Tingguian people, and supported them in protecting their ancestral lands from takeover by Marcos cronies. He was killed and beheaded by government forces on 24 August 1985.

=== Mary Christine Tan ===
Mary Christine Tan (November 30, 1930 – October 6, 2003), was a missionary, nun, and activist, who headed the Association of Major Religious Superiors of Women (AMRSP) from 1973 to 1976, a group of religious mothers who not only vocalized their disdain against the Marcos administration, but also managed to help Filipinos who were suffering from poverty. She later served as a member of the 1987 Philippine constitutional plebiscite.

== See also ==
- Torture methods used by the Marcos dictatorship
