= Military history of the Philippines during the Marcos dictatorship =

The military history of the Philippines during the presidency of Ferdinand Marcos, especially the 14-year period between Marcos' proclamation of Martial Law in September 1972 and his eventual ouster through the People Power Revolution of 1986, was characterized by rapid changes linked to Marcos' use of the military as his "martial law implementor".

During this time, Armed Forces of the Philippines (AFP) units, particularly within the Philippine Constabulary, were noted to have engaged in various human rights abuses. Military camps throughout the country became the site of various detention camps for "political prisoners" which included any individual who spoke out against the Marcos regime, whether they were journalists, educators, religious workers, human rights advocates, academics, artists, or activists.

Officers were promoted and reshuffled, and top commanders were kept on past their retirement ages, based on their expressed allegiances with Ferdinand Marcos. This led to low morale among junior officers who were unable to get promotions in the AFP, and eventually led to the creation of the Reform the Armed Forces Movement (RAM).

When revelations of cheating during 1986 Philippine presidential election came out in February 1986, RAM forces under Defense Secretary Juan Ponce Enrile attempted to stage a Coup against Marcos, but their plot failed when it was discovered by Marcos. They sought help from Philippine Constabulary chief Fidel V. Ramos who joined them, and when they were cornered in Camps Aguinaldo and Crame on Epifanio de los Santos Avenue (EDSA) from Roman Catholic Cardinal Jaime Sin. Sin called on private citizens, already planning protests connected to cheating during the elections, to help protect Enrile and Ramos' forces by forming a human barricade on the stretch of EDSA between the two camps. Marcos issued Military orders to attack Enrile and Ramos' forces while publicly pretending to issue contrary orders. AFP forces rejected the order and began defecting to the Enrile and Ramos faction instead.

Marcos eventually went into exile in Hawaii after the US administration of Ronald Reagan offered to fly him out of the country from Clark Airbase - marking the end of the Marcos dictatorship and bringing in a new administration under Corazon Aquino.

== Marcos and the AFP before Martial Law ==
=== Patronage system in the Armed Forces ===
President Ferdinand Marcos sought to have a strong personal influence over the Armed Forces as soon as he became president in 1965, holding on to the portfolio of defense secretary in the first thirteen months of his presidency to develop what scholars have noted to be "a patronage system within the defense establishment." The portfolio afforded him direct interaction with the AFP's leadership, and to have a hand in the AFP's day-to-day operationalization.

He also immediately began a massive expansion of the Philippine military, with Ilocanos notably being given a preference for promotion to higher ranks. Generals loyal to Marcos were allowed to stay in their positions past their retirement age, or were rewarded with civilian government posts. This phenomenon would later referred to as the "Ilocanization" of the AFP.

Marcos also immediately reversed Macapagal's position on keeping the AFP away from civic programs which could lead to the politicization of the military hierarchy. He instead gave the armed forces a central role in his economic development initiatives and gave the AFP significant training and resources to ease it into this expanded role. This had the effect of expanding the AFP's presence in the countryside, and also gave Marcos' central government the political benefit of weakening the influence of local politicians. Militarization in the countryside also enabled the administration to bulldoze past controversial measures such as dams and infrastructure development.

=== Sacking of Commodore Ramon Alcaraz ===
One of Marcos' early confrontations with an AFP officer who disagreed with him took place within the first year after he was first elected president. Marcos was alleged to have made a deal with smuggler-king Lino Bocalan to restrain the patrols of the Naval Operations Force (NOF) against Smuggling, which was under the command of Philippine Navy Commodore Ramon A. Alcaraz.

In a radio broadcast on January 11, 1966, Marcos included Alcaraz' name in a list of "corrupt officials" and relieved him of command. Alcaraz protested this action and in doing so, also criticized the government's National Defense policy. Alcaraz was placed under investigation for these comments, and Undersecretary for National Defense Ernesto Mata gave him an ultimatum, saying he had a choice between retiring and be demoted. In Alcaraz' reply to Mata, he said:

"You can reduce me to Apprentice Seaman… I don't care. My father was a farmer, I can go back to being a farmer."

Bulacan Representative Rogaciano Mercado eventually began a congressional exposé on the matter, and Marcos was forced to back off. Vindicated but still angry, Alcaraz chose a session of the House Defense Committee to once again criticize the national defense policy and announce his retirement. Alcaraz was applauded as he left the witness stand, and he would thereafter continue to be a staunch critic of Ferdinand Marcos' administration.

== Beginnings of the New People's Army and Moro Conflicts ==
The Marcos administration also marked the beginnings of at least two long-running conflicts that continued to plague later administrations: the Moro conflict and the New People's Army conflict.

=== 1968 Jabidah Massacre and the 1972 birth of the Moro conflict ===
The Moro conflict, began in earnest in 1968 when short-lived organizations such as the Muslim Independence Movement and the Bangsamoro Liberation Organization formed in reaction to news about the Jabidah Massacre,

With the declaration of Martial Law, in September 1972, political parties, including the BMLO and the MIM, were dissolved. So when former MIM member Nur Misuari formed an armed secessionist group called the Moro National Liberation Front, he was quickly able to consolidate power. The MNLF became the single dominant voice calling for Moro independence, and was able to raise a significant armed force. Only then did the Philippines' decades-long Moro conflict had begun in earnest.

=== Beginnings of the New People's Army conflict ===
Meanwhile, the Communist Party of the Philippines was formed in 1968, while the New People's Army (NPA), founded in 1969.

The New People's Army initially had only 60 guerrillas and 35 WWII-era guns, which they all soon lost in an encounter against the Armed Forces of the Philippines. The NPA tried to follow the Maoist military doctrine of "establishing stable base areas," but they took heavy casualties in Northern Luzon as a result, and abandoned the Maoist strategy in favor of dispersing their forces.

The NPA was finally able to regain weaponry on December 29, 1970, when Philippine Military Academy instructor Lt. Victor Corpus defected to the CPP-NPA and led a raid on the PMA armory, timing the raid when most cadets were out on Christmas vacation and the PMA's senior officers including its Superintendent, General Ugalde had left the camp to meet President Ferdinand Marcos upon his scheduled arrival in nearby Baguio. Corpus, who was PMA's designated officer of the day (OOD), guided the NPA raiding team which managed to escape with Browning Automatic Rifles, carbines, machineguns, and various other weapons and ammunition.

Even by the day Martial Law was announced on September 23, 1972, however, the NPA was not a big threat. Just a few days earlier on September 19, 1972, the Philippine National Security Council's threat assessment was "between 'normal' and 'Internal Defense Condition 1'," where the highest condition "3." In 1971, AFP Chief of Staff Manuel T. Yan had prominently told media that the grounds for Marcos to either impose of martial law or suspend the privilege of the writ of habeas corpus did not exist. One of the generals serving under General Fabian Ver of the National Intelligence and Security Authority later recalled that "Even when Martial Law was declared, the communists were not a real threat. The military could handle them."

== Oplan Sagittarius ==
A week before Philippine President Ferdinand Marcos declare martial law in September 1972, copies of the plan for its implementation were distributed to key officials within the Armed Forces. As a way of assuring that any whistleblowers could be easily identified, the copies of the plan were distributed with codeword titles taken from the different signs of the Zodiac. The copy marked "Sagittarius" was given to General Marcos Soliman, who commanded the National Intelligence Coordinating Agency at the time.

When Senator Benigno Aquino Jr. exposed the existence of "Oplan Sagittarius" a week before martial law was declared, other generals were able to deny that they had heard of any operation under the said code title, and it was easy for Marcos to pinpoint General Soliman as the whistleblower who gave the information to Aquino.

Not long after the declaration of martial law, the Marcos-controlled press reported that Soliman had died of a heart attack, but it is believed that Marcos had ordered that he be killed. Marcos then dissolved the National Intelligence Coordinating Agency (NICA) and put a powerful super-agency, the National Intelligence and Security Authority (NISA) in its place, with General Fabian Ver in command.

== The AFP as "martial law implementor" ==
Upon the declaration of martial law in 1972, Marcos used the AFP as what the Davide Commission Report would later call his "martial law implementor," and "one of the vital supports of the regime," functioning, political scientists have noted, "like a private army" for Marcos and his cronies.

=== Arrest and detention of political prisoners ===
Upon the announcement of Martial Law in 1972, one of their earliest tasks was that of quickly arresting and containing Marcos' political opponents, and Marcos' hold on power was effectively broken once enough of the Military withdrew their support from him in February 1986. Antonio Parlade notes that to get the military to ensure their cooperation, Marcos "had to expand the military organization and patronize the generals to buy their loyalty."

=== Expansion of budget and takeover of civilian functions ===
Since it was the "martial law implementor," Marcos expanded the AFP significantly, from a force of 57,100 in 1971 to a 97.89 percent increase of 113,000 personnel in 1976. He also increased the military budget from P880 million in 1972 to P4 billion in 1976.

The military was given many functions aside from its task of national defense, including assisting in the implementation of price controls imposed on key products like corn and rice, enforcing the rules of the national corn procurement program, assisting in the collection of rural and government bank loans, implementing the agrarian reform law, and various police functions such as collecting unlicensed firearms and enforcing curfews, and suppressing strikes, rallies, and other demonstrations.

=== Creation of the CHDF ===
In 1977, Marcos issued Presidential Decree No. 1016, formally establishing the Integrated Civilian Home Defense Forces - irregular paramilitary units supervised and deployed by the heads of the local government in the Philippines - as a force multiplier to augment the numbers of security forces under state control. At its inception, the CHDF numbered 73,000 men, and became a notorious human rights violator.

=== Reaction of the United States ===
Marcos' declaration of Martial Law took place during the Presidency of Richard Nixon and in the middle of the Cold War. Marcos informed Nixon and sought his support. At the time, According to the US National Archives' copy of a Memorandum of Conversation between Nixon and US Ambassador to the Philippines Henry Byroade:

The president declared that we would "absolutely" back Marcos up, and "to the hilt" so long as what he was doing was to preserve the system against those who would destroy it in the name of liberty. The President indicated that... we would not support anyone who was trying to set himself up as military dictator, but we would do everything we can to back a man who was trying to make the system work and to preserve order. Of course, we understood that Marcos would not be entirely motivated by national interests, but this was something which we had come to expect from Asian leaders.

After Nixon, the Ford and Reagan administrations were similarly supportive of Marcos. While the Carter administration expressed diplomatic concerns over the human rights abuses of the Marcos dictatorship, it could not totally withdraw its support from Marcos in light of US foreign policy's need to have the lease on the US Bases in the Philippines renewed by Marcos.

== Human rights abuses of the Marcos dictatorship ==
Civilian and military historians alike agree that "human rights abuses by the troops became rampant" during the Marcos administration, as documented by international monitoring entities such as Amnesty International. Units often specifically cited in these reported incidents include the Metrocom Intelligence and Security Group (MISG), and the 5th Constabulary Security Unit (5CSU) of the Philippine Constabulary, as well as the Intelligence Service of the Armed Forces of the Philippines (ISAFP). The Presidential Security Unit and the National Intelligence and Security Agency (NISA) were also accused of aiding these activities. Aside from human rights abuses, these units were also accused of hounding media entities, corporate management, and opposition groups with threats, intimidation, and violence.

=== "Detention centers" ===
Military camps throughout the country were used as sites for "detention centers" in which political prisoners were kept. Writer Ricky Lee, who was one of the detainees at Ipil Detention Center in Fort Bonifacio, explains that Marcos forces preferred the use "detainee" instead of "prisoner," saying:

"when they captured you, they would call you detainees, not prisoners. There were no charges. You don't know why. They would just detain you so you can't move, you can't be an activist. They'd detain you without any hearing, no charges, and you have no idea when you'd ever get out because you're a detainee."

As the headquarters of the Philippine Constabulary, Camp Crame became the site of five of the Marcos regime's most infamous detention facilities for political prisoners: the Men's Detention Center; the Women's Detention Center, the PC (Philippine Constabulary) Stockade; the MetroCom (Metropolitan Command) Detention Area; and the CIS (Criminal Investigation Service) Detention Area. Meanwhile, Fort Bonifacio became the host of three detention centers full of political prisoners - the Ipil Reception Center (sometimes called the Ipil Detention Center), a higher security facility called the Youth Rehabilitation Center (YRC), and the Maximum Security Unit where Senators Jose W. Diokno and Benigno Aquino Jr. were detained. Other AFP facilities which hosted detention centers included Camp Bagong Diwa in Taguig, Camp Olivas in Pampanga, Camp Evangelista in Cagayan de Oro, Fort Magsaysay in Nueva Ecija, and Camp Allen in Baguio. Non-military sites with detention centers include the Sampaguita Rehabilitation Center in Bicutan within the New Bilibid Prison compound.

=== Torture ===
Various forms of torture were used on detainees during Martial Law, including sexual assaults including rape and degradation; non-sexual physical tortures including variants of electrocution, waterboarding, suffocation, burning, and beating; and various forms of psychological torture. The 1976 Amnesty International Mission Report lists 88 government torturers by their initials, with ranks as junior as Sergeant and as high as Brigadier General. However, the reports of Amnesty International, Task Force Detainees of the Philippines, the World Council of Churches, etc., all assert the fact that the torture happened as a policy of state, meant to stifle opposition, demonstrate the power of the ruling regime, and terrify the population into inaction. In their 1984 report on "Torture in the 80s", Amnesty International expounds:

"Torture does not occur simply because individual torturers are sadistic, even if testimonies verify that they often are. Torture is usually part of the state-controlled machinery to suppress dissent. it is most often used as an integral part of a government's security strategy. Concentrated in the torturer's electrode or syringe is the power and responsibility of the state."

Journalist Raissa Robles later noted that although Amnesty International made President Marcos aware of the names of these perpetrators, only one of them was ever brought to court, and even he was not convicted; and that most of these individuals were eventually promoted despite Marcos' regular press announcements that supposed military torturers had been caught and tried.

=== Massacres ===
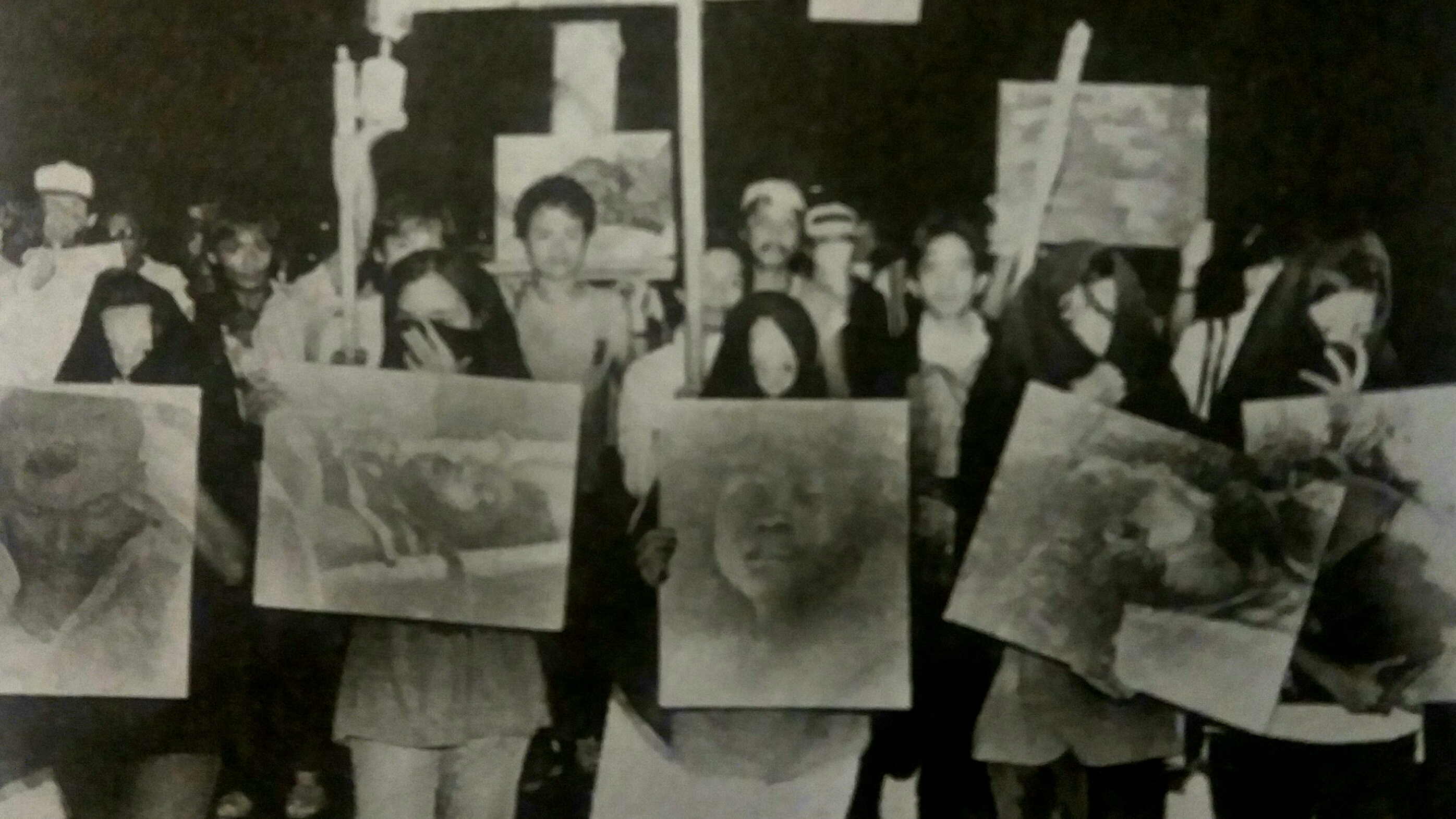
1986 rally against the Marcos dictatorship in which protesters hold up images of Escalante Massacre victims.

Aside from the murder of particular people who opposed the Marcos dictatorship, groups of people were also murdered for collectively mobilizing against the regime. Some of these were attributed to regular military forces, and others were attributed to paramilitary forces which the AFP used as force multipliers. Despite the lifting of Martial Law in 1981, there were five recorded massacres all over the Philippines in the same year alone. Between 1981 and 1982, and there have been 14 recorded massacres, totaling 134 fatalities.

== Early resistance within the AFP ==
Marcos' efforts to ingratiate himself with the leadership of the AFP did not gain him support from the military, however. Even at the very beginning of Marcos' term he had seen resistance such as that of Commodore Ramon Alcaraz (of PMA class 1940) who concluded that Marcos' orders had spring from a deal with criminal elements; and at PMA, instructor Dante Simbulan (of PMA class 1952) had begun emphasizing the need for military officers to understand how socioeconomic woes were affecting ordinary Filipino people. Idealistic young officers such as Lieutenant Victor Corpuz (of PMA class 1967) and Lieutenant Crispin Tagamolila (of PMA class 1971) went as far as to defect to the New People's Army.

Marcos was also not successful at stuffing the leadership of the AFP with his loyal generals, and several expressed objections to Marcos' declaration if Martial Law within what they thought to be the limits of their office. Brigadier General Rafael Ileto (of PMA class 1943) vocally opposed Martial Law when it was still being planned, and was immediately sent away to an overseas diplomatic function as concurrent envoy to Iran and Turkey, and later Laos and Thailand. General Manuel Yan (of PMA class 1941) objected to Marcos' first act of suspending the writ of habeas corpus in 1971, famously told international media that the conditions for either "did not exist," and was compelled to retire early due to his lack of support for its declaration in 1972. Navy Captain Danilo Vizmanos (of USMMA Deck Class of 1950 as part of a scholarship pursuant to the Philippine Rehabilitation Act of 1946), who had taken a stance critical of Philippine ties to the US in the early days of the National Defence College, also resigned from the armed forces before the implementation of martial law.

And just before Martial Law was declared, Philippine Army Commanding General and National Intelligence Coordinating Agency chief Marcos Soliman (of the Philippine Constabulary Academy class of 1933), leaked plans for the implementation of Martial Law to the Philippine Senate so that a legislative investigation could be launched.

During Martial Law itself, officers attempted to execute their duties while minimizing harm to the people, as was the case of Admiral Romulo Espaldon (also of USMMA Deck Class of 1950) who objected to the plans for the 1974 Siege of Jolo, and made sure that the Philippine Navy's ships were in place to rescue civilian evacuees once the attack on MNLF forces within the city did push through. He would later be remembered for sending naval ships to the Jolo Pier and being the "prime mover" of stranded Joloanos to safety. Military Intelligence Service Lt. Col. Bonifacio Gillego spoke up against the Human rights abuses of the Marcos dictatorship, and was forced to flee into exile in the United States, where he committed himself to political organizing against the regime.

== Rapid growth of the NPA under martial law ==
The Communist Party of the Philippines underwent rapid growth from 1972 during the period of martial law under Ferdinand Marcos.

=== First Quarter Storm ===
The social unrest of 1969 to 1970, and the violent dispersal of the resulting "First Quarter Storm" protests were among the early watershed events in which large numbers of Filipino students of the 1970s were radicalized against the Marcos administration. Due to these dispersals, many students who had previously held "moderate" positions (i.e., calling for legislative reforms) became convinced that they had no choice but to call for more radical social change.

=== Radicalization of Moderates ===
Other watershed events that would later radicalize many otherwise "moderate" opposition members include the February 1971 Diliman Commune; the August 1971 suspension of the writ of habeas corpus in the wake of the Plaza Miranda bombing; the September 1972 declaration of Martial Law; the 1980 murder of Macli-ing Dulag; and the August 1983 assassination of Ninoy Aquino.

This radicalization led to a significant growth of the CPP and of the New People's Army under the Marcos administration. Writer and peace advocate Gus Miclat cites the example of Mindanao: "There was not one NPA cadre in Mindanao in 1972. Yes, there were activists, there were some firebrands... but there were no armed rebels then except for those that eventually formed the Moro National Liberation Front. When Marcos fled in 1986, the NPA was virtually in all Mindanao provinces, enjoying even a tacit alliance with the MNLF."

Although they are also accused of having participated in the Plaza Miranda bombing in 1971, the NPA's first acknowledged tactical operation took place in 1974. This took place in Calbiga, Samar, where the NPA ambushed an Army scout patrol and seized a number of their weapons.

== Escalation of the Moro conflict under Martial law ==
=== Establishment of the MNLF ===
While groups calling for the secession of the Moro provinces from the Philippines existed before the declaration of Martial Law, it was the declaration of Martial Law in September 1972 that allowed the groups to coalesce under the flag of a single armed group. Martial Law disbanded political parties including the BMLO and the MIM, and so when Nur Misuari formed a new armed force named called the Moro National Liberation Front on October 21, 1972, it was quickly able to consolidate power as the single dominant voice calling for Moro independence.

=== Battle of Jolo ===
One of the most significant battles of this period was the 1974 Battle of Jolo which devastated the island Municipality of Jolo, which was the capital of the Province of Sulu; displaced 40,000 civilians; and left an unknown number of dead, with estimates ranging from 1,000 to 20,000. The culpability of military forces involved in the Battle of Jolo, led by the 14th Infantry Battalion, has been the subject of controversy, worsened by the news blackout imposed by Marcos at the time. But most civilian accounts and that of the Municipality of Jolo prominently recognized the efforts of the Philippine Navy under the command of Rear Admiral Romulo Espaldon, which compassionately assisted in the evacuation of civilians and the eventual efforts to rehabilitate the devastated island.

=== Tripoli Agreement ===
On December 23, 1976, the Philippine government and the MNLF signed the Tripoli Agreement, declaring a ceasefire on both sides. The agreement provided that Mindanao would remain a part of the Philippines, but that 13 of its provinces would be governed by an autonomous government for the Bangsamoro people. President Marcos later reneged on the agreement, and violence ensued.

=== Establishment of the MILF ===
In 1978, Sheikh Salamat Hashim established the Moro Islamic Liberation Front (MILF), a splinter group of the MNLF. Conflicts between these armed groups and the Armed Forces of the Philippines continued until the end of President Marcos' regime. From 1972 to 1980, at least 50,000 people were killed in the conflict, one million people were internally displaced, and more than 100,000 Philippine Muslims fled by boat to Malaysia.

== Reshuffle of AFP officers ==
Marcos carried out the "largest reshuffle in the history of the armed forces" when he forcibly retired fourteen of the AFP's twenty-five flag officers, including the AFP Chief of Staff, the AFP Vice Chief of Staff, the commanding general of the Philippine Army, the Chief of the Philippine Constabulary, the commanders of all four Constabulary Zones, and one third of all Provincial Commanders of the PC. Other key officers critical of Marcos were compelled to leave the service. In their place, Marcos appointed officers from his home region, the Ilocos, the most significant of whom had familial connections to Marcos – ensuring their familial and regionalistic loyalties to him.

Among the most prominent such appointments were that of General Fabian Ver as commander of the Presidential Security Command in 1965, and AFP chief of staff in 1981; Juan Ponce Enrile as Secretary of Defense from 1970 to 1986; and General Fidel Ramos as chief for the Philippine Constabulary, and later as Armed Forces Vice Chief from 1981 to 1986.

Generals loyal to Marcos were allowed to stay in their positions past their supposed retirement age, or were rewarded with civilian government posts. This led to a loss of morale among the middle-ranks of the AFP, because it meant a significant slowdown in promotions and caused many officers to retire with ranks much lower than they would otherwise have earned.

== The AFP Self Reliance Defense Posture (SRDP) program ==
In late 1971, the Marcos administration had begun conceiving of the AFP Self Reliance Defense Posture (SRDP) program. The proposed program would continue an initiative first put into law in the Flag Law (Commonwealth Act No. 138) of 1936 and implemented through the establishment of a military Research and Development Center in 1948, but a renewed need to push for independent Philippine foreign policy in light of the geopolitics of the 1970s motivated cabinet members - notably Executive Secretary Alejandro Melchor, National Science Development Board (NSDB) chairman Florencio Medina, and AFP Chief of Staff General Manuel Yan - to champion a program which would allow the Armed Forces of the Philippines to develop its own weapons and logistics materiel locally instead of having to buy from foreign sources. As a result of this early advocacy, Secretary Melchor was later referred to in the international military press as the “father of the Philippine rocket program.”

Conversations with Dr. Max Goldberger, the physicist husband of a niece of close Marcos ally Congressman Antonio Raquiza, in December 1971 convinced President Marcos to provide research and intelligence funds for Dr. Goldberger's rocket research and experiments, an initiative which would later be known as Project Santa Barbara. Meanwhile, ongoing expansion of the Government Armory funded by Japanese reparations negotiated during the Garcia and Macapagal administrations led to an initiative which would see M161A automatic rifles manufuactured locally by Manuel Elizalde Jr.'s Elisco Tool Manufacturing Corporation (Elitool)and Squires Bingham Manufacturing (now the Arms Corporation of the Philippines, Armscor) in Marikina.

Both initiatives were integrated into the Self Reliance Defense Posture (SRDP) program created through Presidential Decree no. 415 in 1974, which gave the initiative a ₱100 million annual budget.

By the late 1970s, however, foreign funding for the SRDP program began to dry up as results of the various research initiatives proved disappointing, and the continuation of the research was deemed expensive and wasteful, and the SRDP had effectively wound down many years prior to Marcos' ultimate ouster during the People Power Revolution of 1986.

== Birth of the Reform the Armed Forces Movement ==
To facilitate Marcos' grip on power within the AFP, its officers were promoted and reshuffled, and top commanders were kept on their posts past their retirement ages, based on their expressed allegiances with Ferdinand Marcos. This led to low morale among junior officers who were unable to get promotions in the AFP. Several cabals of dissatisfied officers eventually formed among the middle-ranks of the AFP, most notably the Reform the Armed Forces Movement in the early 1980s.

== Failed February 1986 RAM coup d'état plot ==
=== The Enrile-RAM plan and its failure ===
When revelations of cheating during 1986 Philippine presidential election came out in February 1982, RAM forces under the leadership of Defense Secretary Juan Ponce Enrile wanted to take advantage of the social instability and plotted to unseat Ferdinand Marcos and take Malacañang Palace by force.

The goal of the RAM coup d'état, planned by Colonels Gregorio Honasan and Red Kapunan, was to overthrow Marcos and turn power over to military junta which would include Enrile. Of the personalities expected to be part of the junta, only Enrile was aware of the plan. The other four people whom the RAM wanted to be part of the junta - Ambassador and retired Lieutenant General Rafael Ileto; former Marcos Executive Secretary Rafael Salas; opposition leader Cory Aquino; and Cardinal Sin - did not know about the plot or of their place in the planned junta. (Some accounts say that Fidel Ramos and opposition businessman Jaime Ongpin were also supposed to be part of the junta, and other accounts that various other government officials who were "friendly" to the opposition were to be included.)

The plan was to enter Malacañang palace at dawn on February 23, 1986, from four points - the Pasig river; from the Presidential Security Command headquarters at Malacañang Park; the Palace gymnasium; and the J.P. Laurel gate - while smaller attacks on Fort Bonifacio and Villamor Air Base hampered the rest of the armed forces from responding to the attack.

However, this RAM coup d'état failed when it was discovered by Marcos on February 22, 1986 - a day before it was supposed to be implemented.

=== Ramos defection ===
At about Mid-afternoon on February 22 Enrile left his house in Makati where he and the RAM forces had been planning the coup, and moved to his offices in Camp Aguinaldo. He sought support from Philippine Constabulary chief Fidel V. Ramos who defected and withdrew support from Marcos. Both Enrile and Ramos reached out to Roman Catholic Cardinal Jaime Sin to ask for help. Ramos reached out to Major Gen. Prospero Olivas of the Philippine Constabulary Metropolitan Command (MetroCom) and Philippine Navy Commodore Tagumpay Jardiniano, receiving their support.

However, even with their combined forces, Enrile and Ramos were cornered in Camps Aguinaldo and Crame on Epifanio de los Santos Avenue (EDSA).

== People Power Revolution ==
=== Civilian demonstrations and attack orders ===
With Enrile and Ramos' forces still trapped in camps Aguinaldo and Crame respectively on the evening of February 22, Cardinal Sin called on private citizens, already planning protests connected to cheating during the elections, to help protect Enrile and Ramos' forces by forming a human barricade on the stretch of EDSA between the two camps. Large masses of people began to gather around EDSA around midnight and through the early hours of February 23.

Marcos issued Military orders to attack Enrile and Ramos' forces while publicly pretending to issue contrary orders. AFP forces attempted to implement these orders but initially could not get close to the camps due to the crowds of civilians. AFP units and commanders eventually rejected these order began defecting to the Enrile and Ramos faction instead.

=== The Sotelo landing ===
A strategically significant turning point was the "Sotelo landing" which took place in the early morning hours of Monday, February 24, 1986. Col. Antonio Sotelo defected with the entirety of the 15th Strike Wing, Philippine Air Force, bringing along 6 gunships, 2 Sikorsky rescue helicopters, and a utility BC-105, and then later flew back to Villamor Air Base to disable six remaining UH-1 'Huey' helicopters which Marcos' forces could have used to attack Aguinaldo and Crame. The Sotelo landing is recognized as the moment when Marcos lost control of the Philippine Air Force, and also as a turning point in the People Power Revolution, because it encouraged even more AFP units to withdraw their support for the dictatorship.

=== Fourth Marine Brigade refusal to fire on Camp Crame ===
At dawn on the same day, AFP forces eventually managed to enter Camp Aguinaldo through the Logistics Command entrance on Santolan Road, coming in from their staging positions in Libis and dispersing the crowds around Gate 6 by using teargas. The Fourth Marine brigade under the command of Colonel Braulio Balbas was ordered to position howitzers and mortars on the Camp Aguinaldo grounds and fire on Camp Crame. Balbas was given orders to fire on Crame four times, but stalled each time, saying they were "still positioning the cannons." This refusal to fire is identified by historians as the moment when Marcos lost control of the Philippine Marine Corps.

=== End of the dictatorship ===
On February 25, 1986, Corazon Aquino was sworn in as president by Senior Associate Justice Claudio Teehankee, although Marcos tried to stage his own inauguration an hour later.

Enrile wanted Corazon Aquino to hold her inauguration as new president in Camp Crame, but Aquino refused, emphasizing that the People Power Revolution was a civilian victory by the Filipino people, not by a rebel military faction. She held her inauguration on February 25, 1986, at the nearby Club Filipino instead, with Enrile and Ramos invited only as guests.

Recognizing the significance of the People Power Revolution, the US administration of Ronald Reagan eventually withdrew its support for Marcos and arranged for his exile to Hawaii. Marcos fled Malacañang and stayed at Clark Airbase arguing with the Americans through the evening, finally agreeing to board a US Air Force flight to exile at around 5 AM on February 26, 1986.

== Prominent officers who publicly disagreed with Marcos ==
A number of notable officers disagreed with various decisions of Marcos and his top military appointees - some in the years before the declaration of Martial Law; some with regard to specific orders given during the authoritarian years of Martial Law and the Fourth Republic; some as part of the failed RAM coup of 1986; and many more in support of the civilian People Power Revolution which removed Marcos from power.

=== Before the Martial Law declaration ===
Notable examples of officers who disagreed with Marcos in the years leading up to Martial Law include:

- Commodore Ramon A. Alcaraz of the Philippine Navy - forced to resign when he refused to go easy on smugglers, one year into Marcos' first presidential term.
- LtCol. Dante Simbulan Sr., PhD, graduate of the PMA class of 1952 and Captain in the 1st Scout Ranger Regiment who later joined the Corps of Professors at the Philippine Military Academy - resigned his commission after disagreeing with the PMA hierarchy about inviting guest speakers with progressive views to speak to the cadets, later became a professor, and was arrested by Marcos upon the declaration of Martial Law in 1972.
- General Manuel T. Yan (ret), Armed Forces of the Philippines Chief of Staff - disagreed with the 1972 declaration of Martial Law 1971 suspension of the privilege of the Writ of Habeas Corpus, prominently telling international media that the conditions for either "did not exist." Retired so that he would not have to participate in the implementation of Martial Law.
- Brig. Gen. Rafael Ileto prior Commanding General of the Philippine Army until 1971, later Deputy Chief of Staff of the AFP - was one of the few generals who opposed the President, losing favor for the next series of promotions in the patronage politics that has already begun in the promotion system in the AFP.
- General Marcos Soliman, Commanding General of the Philippine Army, and later chief of the National Intelligence Coordinating Agency - was supposed to be one of the key implementors of Martial Law, but instead leaked plans for its implementation to the Philippine Senate.
- Colonel Terry Adevoso (ret) - famous World War II guerilla hero who was part of the Liberal Party and was imprisoned by Marcos during Martial Law as a result.

=== During the Marcos Dictatorship ===
Notable examples of officers who left the military and became activists against the Marcos dictatorship include:

- Captain Danilo Vizmanos of the Philippine Navy - questioned Marcos' decision to break ties with Taiwan and establish relations with the Mao's People's Republic of China, resigned upon the declaration of Martial Law, and was later arrested and tortured for his beliefs.
- Colonel Bonifacio Gillego - Former intelligence officer who spoke against abuses by AFP officers, exiled to the US where he worked to eventually expose the fake medals in Ferdinand Marcos' supposed military record.

Notable examples of officers who objected to specific orders given during the dictatorship include:

- Rear Admiral Romulo M. Espaldon of the Philippine Navy - noted for his strong objection to the scorched earth tactics used by the AFP in the 1974 Battle of Jolo, and later played a key role in rehabilitation efforts on the island.

=== Participants in the Aborted RAM coup d'état of February 1986 ===
- Colonel Gregorio Honasan - Leader and co-founder of the Reform the Armed Forces Movement and one of only two people who had knowledge of the whole tactical plan for the planned coup d'état.
- Colonel Eduardo Kapunan - co-founder of the RAM, assigned to lead the group which would attack Malacañang from across the Pasig River
- Lt. Colonel Victor Batac - co-founder of the RAM, tasked with manning the RAM command post at Nichols Field alongside Col. Almonte.
- Colonel Jose Almonte - member of RAM who was their main liaison with General Fidel Ramos during the planning phase of the coup; later tasked with manning the RAM command post at Nichols Field alongside Col. Batac.
- Minister of Defense Juan Ponce Enrile - Leader of the February 1986 Coup plot

=== Officers who defected or questioned orders during the People Power Revolution ===
Notable examples of officers who defected from the Marcos administration during the People Power Revolution include:

- General Fidel V. Ramos, AFP Vice Chief of Staff and Chief of the Philippine Constabulary - was one of the first officers Enrile sought help from after the RAM coup d'état was exposed, and immediately expressed support for Enrile
- Colonel Antonio Sotelo, one of the 15th Strike Wing of the Philippine Air Force - one of the earliest officers to defect from the Marcos government during the People Power Revolution.
- Major Charles Hotchkiss, squadron commander of the 20th Air Commando Squadron - defected alongside Sotelo and was the one who later commanded a warning airstrike on the grounds of Malacañang palace, to demonstrate that the defectors had gained air superiority and control of the Air Force.
- Commodore Tagumpay Jardiniano, Naval Defense Force chief - An early defector to the Enrile and Ramos camp, announced his defection to 50 Navy officers on the morning of February 24, after which all 50 naval officers joined him in defecting.
- Lieutenant Benjamin Magalong, Philippine Constabulary commander in Buguias, Benguet - was the first officer in the Cordilleras to defect to the Ramos and Enrile faction. He left a skeletal force in command of their post in Northern Benguet and left for Baguio City on the evening of February 23, going to the Baguio City Police station where he disarmed the station personnel to prevent any untoward incident while massive protests were occurring at the Baguio Cathedral and Session Road area, with Baguio citizens expressing support of events happening in Crame and Aguinaldo.
- Cadet Corps, Philippine Military Academy - took a vote and decided as a body to support the Enrile and Ramos camps

Notable examples of officers who refused or questioned Malacañang's orders during the People Power Revolution without immediately defecting include:

- Brigadier General Artemio Tadiar, Marine commandant - refused to ram through civilians on the afternoon of February 23 despite orders from Gen. Ramas; allowed Col. Balbas to "use his discretion" on the morning of February 23 when Balbas received orders from Ramas to fire on Camp Crame despite likely civilian casualties
- Colonel Braulio Balbas, Commander of the Fourth Marine brigade - refused orders to fire on Camp Crame during the People Power Revolution because civilians would be killed if his men did so.
- Colonel Rodolfo Biazon, Davao City Marine commander - gave protection to Corazon Aquino in her civil disobedience campaign in the city, without announcing any defection

== Need for security sector reform after Marcos ==
The Marcos administration is considered to have marked a decline for AFP in terms of its traditional values of civilian supremacy and professionalism, leading to a need for security sector reform during later administrations, as per the recommendations of the Davide Commission in 1990 and the Feliciano Commission in 2003.

Steps the AFP sought to take towards professionalization under the Philippine Defense Reform Program from 2003 to 2016 included the development of "integrity development programs", programmatic efforts to improve the quality of service performance, continuing development programs for commanders and staff, and reforms in the recruitment of enlisted personnel.

Alongside capability development, "professionalization of all ranks" is one of two strategic priorities identified by the 15 year AFP Transformation Roadmap initiated during the Duterte administration.

== See also ==
- Security sector governance and reform in the Philippines
- Economic history of the Philippines during the Marcos dictatorship
- Human rights abuses of the Marcos dictatorship
- Marcos dictatorship
- People Power Revolution
