= Nemesio Prudente =

Filipino academic administrator (1926–2008)

Nemesio E. Prudente
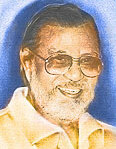

4th President of the Philippine College of Commerce
- In office 1962–1972
- Preceded by: Victor Dela Torre
- Succeeded by: Narciso Albaraccin, Jr.

2nd President of the Polytechnic University of the Philippines
- In office 1986–1991
- Preceded by: Pablo T. Mateo
- Succeeded by: Zenaida A. Olonan

Personal details
- Born: Nemesio Encarnacion Prudente; December 1, 1926 Rosario, Cavite, Insular Government of the Philippine Islands
- Died: March 20, 2008 (aged 81) Dasmariñas, Cavite, Philippines
- Parent(s): Felicidad Encarnacion; Mamerto Prudente
- Education: United States Merchant Marine Academy (BS); San Francisco State College (MA); University of Southern California (Ph.D.)
- Profession: Educator; Human rights defender Activist

Nemesio "Doc" Encarnacion Prudente (December 1, 1926 – March 20, 2008) was a Filipino educator, political activist, and human rights defender who served as president of the Polytechnic University of the Philippines. Prudente is credited with revitalizing public education in the Philippines by institutionalizing reforms in the state university he led, which will eventually become the largest state university by enrollment.

During World War II, Prudente was a courier for guerrillas as a teenager. In the 1950s, Prudente worked at Sears, Roebuck and Co. in the United States while pursuing his studies in two California universities. After returning to the Philippines in 1959, he was appointed president of the Philippine College of Commerce (predecessor of PUP) in 1962, serving until the declaration of martial law in 1972.

During the presidency of Ferdinand Marcos, Prudente was detained and imprisoned three times for his activism. After the People Power Revolution, he was among the first political detainees to be released from prison. Prudente survived two assassination attempts (in 1987 and 1988) during his tenure as PUP president.

== Biography ==
=== Early years and childhood ===
Nemesio E. Prudente was born and raised in the coastal coast on Rosario, Cavite, son of Felicidad Encarnacion who died early due to childbirth and Mamerto Prudente, gifted musician and kitchen steward in United States Navy in later years. Nemesio belonged to the second Filipino generation to be educated in English and held the United States in high regard as its home nation. During his childhood Nemesio was seen nationalistic due to the influence of his paternal grandfather Florencio or Enciong who fought on Philippine Revolution from 1896 to 1892 during teenage years. In 1939-40, he studied at UP highschool to be presently known as UP Integrated School same school where historian Renato Constantino and future 10th president of Philippines, Ferdinand Marcos also studied.

When the Japanese invaded the Philippines, the Nemesio family were forced to evacuate in their province in Rosario, Cavite and continued the study together with his siblings in Cavite High School. During the Japanese occupation, Nemesio became courier for the "Mag-irogs" one of the four guerilla groups recognized later by U.S Army, driving a kalesa to Manila selling vegetables and chicken, and smuggling information for guerillas in Rizal and Cavite; meanwhile, his brother, Dante, who joined the PMA cadets in Bataan, fought in the last stand against the Japanese that ends up in infamous Bataan Death March but successfully escaped and return home in their house in Ermita and brought back to their province in Rosario.

At the end of war in February 1945 Nemesio returned to the school in Cavite and not to the UP campus in Ermita. According to his sister, Florence Cabana Nemesio was quiet and respectful to elders. The ambitioned dream of being class valedictorian was shattered when he lost his temper after the class in Military Science where the teacher lecturing about the folk dances, Nemesio was bored then he raised his hand and told the teacher, "Why don't you talk about the subject and not waste our time?". Not graduating with valedictorian, Nemesio couldn't enter University of the Philippines without tuition due to limited family financial resources and the only option was Mapúa University which was a prestige college founded by the U.S educated architect, Tomas Mapua.

=== Early adulthood ===
In September 1946, Nemesio was selected as one of the 50 Filipino scholars in United States Merchant Marine Academy to sail to San Francisco, United States in January, 1947. Afterwards he met several personalities including Future Navy admiral Romulo Espaldon and activist-turned-navy officer Danilo Vizmanos which his classmates. Additionally, he acquainted leaders in the field of military, politics, and business in the Philippines who were then enrolled at US universities. He received a BS in Nautical Science with a minor in International Trade when he left the Academy as a member of the Class of 1950B.

He chose to work in the US in order to support his family rather than pursue a career in the marine sector or go back in the then-Philippine Naval Patrol (now the Philippine Navy). He had trouble getting a work at first due to his race, but he eventually got a job in Sears, Roebuck and Co. as a junior executive in its International Marketing Division. He completed a PhD in Political Science at the University of Southern California and an MA in International Relations at the San Francisco State College, a present day San Francisco State University where he also developed his interests on Marxist ideology. Nemesio and his family returned to the Philippines in 1959.

=== Rise in PCC / PUP ===
After joining the faculty at Far Eastern University from 1960 to 1962, he subsequently became the graduate school dean (1961-1962). Following the presidency of Diosdado Macapagal, Alejandro Roces, a long time acquaintances of Dr Nemesio and secretary of education at that time, appointed him as president of PCC, a predecessor of Polytechnic University of the Philippines located at the University Belt in Lepanto Street, currently known today as Rizal Campus. He was renowned for his progressive leadership, standing shoulder to shoulder with faculty and students during protests and pickets on a variety of subjects, from pressuring Congress to increase school funding to encouraging students to engage in critical discourse on sociopolitical concerns. Most notably, he led the efforts in the transfer of the PCC campus to its current location in Santa Mesa, Manila. He also improved the conditions of the PCC by transforming it from its old status as a "glorified high school which produced secretaries, bookkeepers, and various peoples for government offices to the country's largest state university. Dr Nemesio was well-known for actively supporting democratic and anti-imperialist social groups during the First Quarter Storm, including the Movement for a Democratic Philippines and the Movement of Concerned Citizens for Civil Liberties. He was therefore among those who were imprisoned following the suspension of the writ of habeas corpus, notwithstanding his claim that he was not a part of any radical group. After being ultimately freed, he was detained once more in 1972 after President Ferdinand Marcos declared martial law in the nation. He nevertheless was able to escape, and joined the underground struggle. He had a significant impact on the formation of the People's Democratic Movement/Philippine Liberation Movement and its urban guerrilla group, the Gerilyang Anak Pawis. But he was eventually incarcerated for six years within Fort Bonifacio after being caught once again.

=== Later years and death ===
He was one of the people set free during the EDSA People Power Revolution in 1986, and he was then reinstated to his prior position at PCC, which was then renamed as PUP. He persisted in supporting nationalist principles and human rights in the midst of the recently restored democratic administration. As PUP president, he oversaw the Samahan ng mga Ex-Detainees Laban sa Detensyon at para sa Amnestiya (SELDA). He managed to survive two assassination attempts during his second term: the first occurred on November 10, 1987, when his lawyer was assassinated, and the second occurred seven months later, when three of his colleagues were also killed. numerous corporate organizations, either as a management consultant or a member of the board of directors. In 1991, Prudente stepped down as President of PUP in order to run as a Senator in the 1992 Philippine general election. He lost, placing 46th out of 163 candidates for Senator. Up to the time of his passing, he was still actively involved in his causes and his obligations as a lay leader of the Methodist Church. His remains were simply wrapped in a white shroud and placed in a cardboard box before being cremated, as per Dr. Prudente's instructions, Then, in his native province of Cavite, his ashes were dispersed over the coastline.

== Legacy ==
=== Polytechnic University of the Philippines ===
In 1962, with the initiatives of the PCC President Dr Prudente, the establishment of Philippine College of Commerce - Placement Service Unit (PCC-PSU) a modern-day PUP Career Development and Placement Office (PUP-CDPS), envisioned to provide career development assistance for its students and alumni. The emergence of the nationalistic movement in the school campuses, supplied further momentum to the achievement of President Prudente's progressive vision and goals for PCC. The Supreme Student Council president's nomination as a member of the board of trustees made it possible for students to participate in the decision-making process at the school. The involvement of the PCC in the Progressive movement was held by Marcos administration to include Prudente among the targets of suppression of well-known Anti-Marcos figures in 1968.

Under his presidency in newly renamed Polytechnic University of the Philippines, Dr Nemesio Prudente assigned a committee for formulating new university philosophy, mission, hymn, logo and restructuring of several departments which some of its namely the "Electronic Data Processing" under the college of business restructured into College of Computer Management and Information Technology a predecessor of College of Computer and Information Sciences. Newly graduate programs were created including the Master in Industrial Engineering Management (MIEM), Master of Arts in psychology (MAP) and Master in Education Management (MEM). Under his term the Public Affairs Office established a Community Relations Office. The similar agreement to UP-DND Accord; Prudente-Ramos accord or known as PUP-DND accord was signed in 1990 to recognize students to express academic freedom and protect against the police and military interventions.

=== Bantayog ng mga Bayani ===
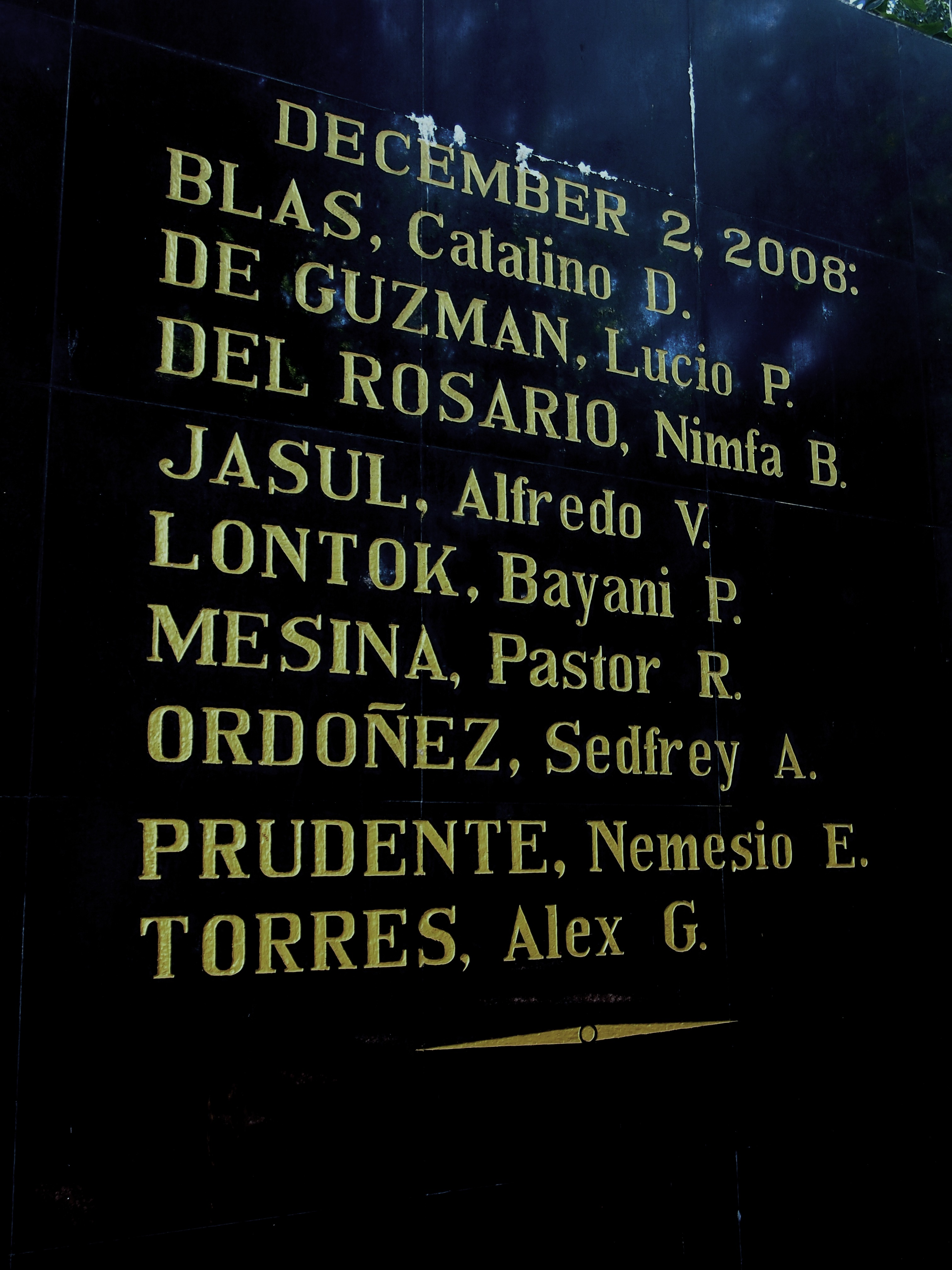
Detail of the Wall of Remembrance at the Bantayog ng mga Bayani, showing names from the 2008 batch of Bantayog Honorees, including that of Nemesio Prudente.

In November 2011, Prudente was among 14 individuals honored by having their named engraved on the Wall of Remembrance of the Bantayog ng mga Bayani, which honors the martyrs and heroes who fought against the Marcos Dictatorship. Prudente was noted to have developed a close relationship with Philippine Military Academy instructor Dante Simbulan, Navy Capt. Danilo Vizmanos and Philippine Merchant Marine Academy Superintendent Rogelio Morales, who all shared his advocacies; the latter two are fellow Bantayog ng mga Bayani honorees.

Academic offices
Preceded by Pablo T. Mateo	President of the Polytechnic University of the Philippines; 1986–1991	Succeeded by Zenaida A. Olonan
