= Rogelio Morales =

Filipino mariner (1920–1994)

- Born: Rogelio Concepcion Morales; November 5, 1922; Quiapo, Manila, Philippine Islands
- Died: February 19, 1994 (aged 71); Quezon City, Philippines
- Occupations: Sailor, seafarer, activist

Rogelio Concepcion Morales (November 5, 1922 – February 19, 1994) was a Filipino master mariner, educator, Navy captain, and activist best known for his role in the transformation of the Nautical School of the Philippines/Philippine Nautical School into the modern-day Philippine Merchant Marine Academy, and for his activism to promote the rights of Filipino seafarers, which led him to become the president of various advocacy societies and unions through the 1950s and 1960s, and to become founder of the Concerned Seamen of the Philippines (CSP) in 1983.

== Legacy ==
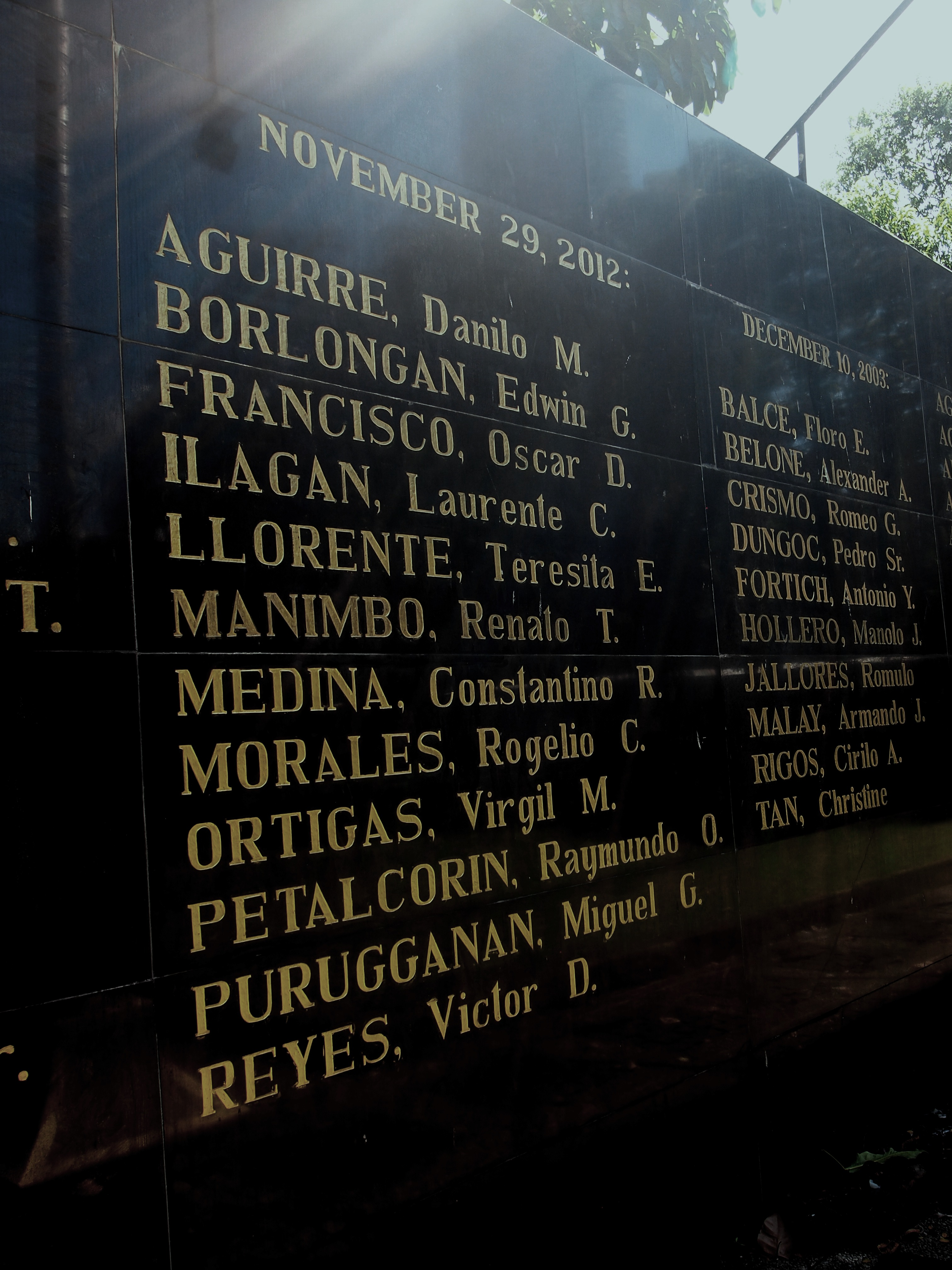
Detail of the Wall of Remembrance at the Bantayog ng mga Bayani, showing names from the 2012 batch of Bantayog Honorees, including that of Rogelio Morales.

In November 2012, Morales was among 12 individuals honored by having their named engraved on the Wall of Remembrance of the Bantayog ng mga Bayani, which honors the martyrs and heroes who fought against the Marcos Dictatorship. Because of his maritime background, he developed a close relationship with Philippine Military Academy instructor Dante Simbulan, Navy Capt. Danilo Vizmanos and Polytechnic University of the Philippines President Nemesio Prudente, who all shared Morales' advocacies; the latter two are fellow Bantayog ng mga Bayani honorees.

== Activism during Martial Law ==
In 1972, Morales was removed from his position as superintendent of the Philippine Merchant Marine Academy (PMMA) after openly opposing the policies of the Marcos administration. He was arrested and detained at the Ipil Rehabilitation Center in Fort Bonifacio in 1974. Following his release, he continued his work in the maritime industry, becoming a certified magnetic compass adjuster that same year.

In 1983, Morales founded the Concerned Seamen of the Philippines (CSP), which is an organization that advocated for the welfare and rights of Filipino seafarers. Furthermore, the organization also opposed the Marcos dictatorship's use of overseas Filipino workers' remittances to support the country's struggling economy under Martial Law. Under Morales' leadership, the CSP grew from a small organization into a group with thousands of members and became involved in the international mobilization of anti-Martial Law movements within the global maritime industry.

In May 1985, Morales delivered a speech criticizing the Marcos administration's treatment of Filipino seafarers at the Fifth International Christian Maritime Association conference in Baguio City. He also spoke before international organizations abroad to gain support for Filipino seafarers and the broader struggle against authoritarian rule. In the years leading up to the 1986 People Power Revolution, Morales helped unite various opposition groups by facilitating communication, providing meeting places, and offering logistical support to individuals involved in the anti-dictatorship movement.
