= Battle of Jolo (1974) =

Battle during the Moro conflict

- Part of the Moro conflict
Date	February 4, 1974 – February 11, 1974; 52 years ago
Location	Jolo, Sulu, Philippines
Result	Philippine government victory: Philippine Armed Forces regain control of Jolo, Sulu.; Jolo municipality suffers heavy damage; 40,000 civilians rendered homeless; Almost two-thirds of Jolo burnt

Belligerents
Moro National Liberation Front	Philippines: Armed Forces of the Philippines

Commanders and leaders
Nur Misuari – MNLF Leader	(Philippines) Ferdinand Marcos – Commander-in-Chief (Philippines) Col. Salvador M. Mison – 14th Infantry Battalion leader

Casualties and losses
21 - 516 killed 200-300 killed (Philippine Government claim; unconfirmed)	(Philippines) 19–250 killed 1–2 F86 destroyed 4 helicopter damaged
- 1,000—10,000 civilians killed 20,000 civilians killed (MNLF claim)

The battle of Jolo, also referred to as the burning of Jolo or the siege of Jolo, was a military confrontation between the Moro National Liberation Front (MNLF) and the government of the Philippines in February 1974 in the municipality of Jolo, in the southern Philippines.

It is considered one of the key early incidents of the Moro insurgency in the Philippines, and led numerous Moro leaders to resist martial law under Ferdinand Marcos.

MNLF forces initially managed to control the municipality, except the airport and an adjacent military camp. Government forces led by the 14th Infantry Battalion managed to regain control of the town. The United States military also reportedly participated according to both government and MNLF officials.

== Background ==
Jolo had a population divided into three groups, Muslim (Moro), Chinese and Christian. The Philippine military which burned Jolo in 7–8 February 1974 killed 20,000 civilians. Although, the Philippine military claimed that the MNLF burned the town as the "fires started in areas occupied by them".

Mixed Chinese-Tausug people (Lanang) engaged in business and moved to Jolo since the Sulu Sultanate. One man named Mario who survived in 1974 Jolo burning identified as a Christian Tausug and was of Chinese descent. He said "We have a Chinese community, the Chinese Chamber of Commerce. My father was a member of the Chinese Chamber. The Chinese community [in Jolo] had a Chinese School … that was the Sulu Tong Jin school. My grandfather was one of the pioneers of that school. He came from China. So, he went to Jolo and married my grandmother, who was a Muslim. But I’m not a Muslim. I’m a Catholic." Tausug in Jolo denied there was any religious sectarianism or hatred before the 1974 burning of the city by the Philippines. MNLF member Khalifa used to have the rosary in his house along with images of Catholic saints and in elementary school he went to church services. They prayed the Lord is with thee, Hail Mary full of Grace and the Rosary. Another Muslim Tausug said “Jolo was very beautiful. The relationship between Muslims and Christian was extraordinary … there’ s no discrimination. There’s no religious disparity. There were intermarriages among Muslims and Christians.” Since there was a large Chinese community in Jolo, it was called "Little Hong Kong" by a Tausug named Muhammad. Omar, another Tausug Muslim said “The Chinese sold products from Malaysia and Indonesia. If they saw something that is profitable, they would make it their business.”

In Jolo politics, the pure Muslims, Chinese and Christians serving as councilors in Jolo were categorised according to Muslim, Chinese or Christian identity but the Chinese-Moro mestizo Tuchay Tan's group identification was left unclear.

An MNLF member named Khalifa who lived in Jolo said that before the war "The Christians and Muslims had a good relationship with each other. As a matter of fact, my friends were mostly Christians. I also attended church services when I was an elementary student. We had so many santos and santas (images of saints) in our house. We prayed the rosary, the Hail Mary full of grace, the Lord is with thee. 'Blessed is thy among women and blessed is the fruit of thy womb Jesus.' We prayed like that before their image, what the Muslims called idols."

Samuel Kong Tan wrote that he was familiar with MNLF members and their ideology and he reprimanded G. Carter Bentley's review of Samuel Kong Tan's work in "Historical Perspective on the Muslim Armed Struggle? (Critical Review of Samuel Tan's The Filipino Muslim Armed Struggle, 1900-1972), G. Carter Bentley. Bentley had assumed that all Moros practiced sharia and prohibited intermarriage of non-Muslim men with Muslim women and that MNLF was an Islamic movement. Samuel Kong Tan, who was a mixed Chinese-Moro mestizo himself, reprimanded Bentley for his errors, reminding him that Moros practiced folk Islam and sharia was not applied in Moro lands and that Moros allowed intermarriage of non-Muslim men with Muslim women, with his own grandparents being a non-Muslim Chinese trader, Kong Bu Wa who married a Moro Muslim woman Latia Jaham. Samuel Kong Tan also said he had personal knowledge of MNLF leaders and that MNLF was not "purely Islamic" unlike what Bentley said.

Samuel Kong Tan mentioned the use of "jihad", Marxist-Leninist program by the MNLF, Nur Misuari, the Sulu movement and the Corregidor Massacre in "The Filipino Muslim Armed Struggle, 1900-1972".

== Narrative from the US Embassy ==
According to a 1974 United States Embassy memo that was declassified by the United States Department of State in 2005, the following events occurred prior to, during, and after the siege:

1. Most serious fighting yet between gov't forces and Muslim rebels in Southern Philippines has occurred in Jolo City, the capital of Sulu Province. While picture still incomplete, following appears to be the progression of recent events:

a. In January, Armed Forces of Phils (AFP) began increasing their forces on Jolo island in preparation for major offensive against estimated two thousand armed rebels belonging to Moro National Liberation Front (MNLF). Also in January, MNLF group took over several small towns in southern Jolo controlled by large group of former rebels who split off from MNLF and agreed to cooperate with GOP in December (See Manila 1740).

b. In late January, MNLF rebels began to harass AFP units at Jolo City airport with mortar fire. Phil Air Force was forced to remove aircraft from Jolo to Zamboanga.

c. On Feb 4 AFP forces landed on south coast of Jolo in attempt to retake several MNLF controlled municipalities.

d. On afternoon of Feb 7, rebels attacked Phil Army units defending airport. Rebels almost succeeded in taking Army 4th Brigade headquarters located in Notre Dame College complex at airport but were repelled with AFP losing 19 killed and rebels 21, according to fragmentary reports. Airport was closed as result fighting. Phil military sources in Zamboanga City told an American observer that airport had been "lost" twice and retaken from rebels between Feb 7 and 9. Govt reinforcements were landed and fought through town to airport. AFP lost one F-86 and four helicopters were severely damaged. Embassy believes that AFP has since kept control of airport and driven most rebels from city. Defense Secretary Enrile and AFP Chief of Staff General Espino visited Jolo City on Feb 11.

e. As fight for airport proceeded, mortar rounds and house-to-house fighting touched off small fires in tinderbox Jolo City. Napalm was dropped by Phil Air Force and may have added to fire, which quickly destroyed most of the town. Govt officials have claimed that rebels set torch to city.

f. Chief of Police, whose forces reportedly fired in air rather than against rebels, is under arrest. Enrile told foreign press Feb 12 that Jolo City Mayor Barlie Abubakar left city with some of his police and retreating rebels and is being sought by AFP. Abubakar's son, Nizzam, may have died leading the MNLF attack.

2. Embassy has no clear estimate of number of casualties. We assume that intensity of fighting and burning of city resulted in large number of military and civilian casualties.

3. Fighting has produced many homeless refugees. AFP Intelligence Chief General Paz told embassy officer Feb 13 that 40,000 persons have been made homeless in Jolo City. Govt relief officials report that by Feb 10 some 6,000 refugees had been transported by coast guard boats to Zamboanga City and more have presumably been moved since. These add to 18,000 refugees from Jolo who were already in Zamboanga City, including those who foresaw the attack and were able to escape beforehand. Other refugees from fighting have presumably fled to Basilan and other nearby islands. Initial govt relief efforts include sending funds, Nutribuns and clothing for refugees in Zamboanga City.

4. There has been no mention in local press of recent fighting in Jolo. Manila bureau of Associated Press has filed numerous reports which contain further details of situation.

5. Comment: Impact that rebel attack on Jolo City may have on confused Sulu political situation still unclear. Fighting may polarize problem on this island even further and could force consolidation of disputing Muslim factions behind MNLF. If this occurs, it would leave AFP increasingly isolated and with reduced local support on island.

6. Muslim rebels will probably be quick to blame the burning of Jolo City on policies of President Marcos, and recent developments will undoubtedly add fuel to criticism of GOP policy at next week's Lahore conference. Muslims in Sulu as well as Mindanao will have increased cause to believe that GOP desires military solution to Muslim insurgency, particularly since few of repeated govt promises for increased economic benefits for Muslim areas have been implemented

7. In near term, immediate concern is that fighting may flare up in other troubled areas of south. Major trouble spots may be Zamboanga City, where overflow of embittered refugees is present, or in Cotabato area, where several thousand rebels may be tempted to take advantage of concentration of AFP forces in Jolo to launch new attacks.

8. The policy of attraction which had been followed for past five months by SOWESCOM head Admiral Espaldon would also appear to be major casualty of renewed fighting. Although it is believed Espaldon opposed AFP operation on Jolo, he was apparently overruled by Manila. He will probably be retained with SOWESCOM but credibility of his policy of attraction will suffer as result recent events

== Narratives from Witnesses ==
=== Abas Candao ===
Dr. Abas Candao of Maguindanao, a UP College of Medicine graduate, Batch 1971, wrote the following journal entry of those days while assigned at the Sulu provincial hospital in Jolo:

The fire which started about three o'clock in the afternoon from the eastern sector was blown into town by strong southeasterly winds leaving behind its path nothing but scrap and ashes as it devoured its way through, swallowing the business sector and rapidly spreading towards Asturias. The heinous column of fire and smoke mushroomed high into the air sending out fiery tongues and swaying ominously to where the wind would lead it. It was a dreadful sight in the night, providing its own light for its horror performance. Silently, their eyes moist with tears, providing its own light for its horror performance.

=== Noor Saada ===
Noor Saada writes in his article "KISSA AND DAWAT: The 1974 Battle of Jolo, narratives and quest for social conscience":

I was born in Tulay, Jolo, Sulu, in 1972 and was barely two years old when the Battle of Jolo occurred in seven bloody days in February 1974. It was roughly seven bloody days of destruction, death and displacement at a scale unimaginable. It was because of this war that our family was forced to seek refuge in Tawi-Tawi. As I was growing up, the horrors and agonies of that war was repeated in stories from my grandparents, parents, uncles and aunties, and elders cousins.

=== Said Sadain Jr. ===
In his article "February 7, 1974: The Jolo-caust," Said Sadain Jr. wrote:

I was in Jolo in 1974, in that conflagration, as a fifteen-year old high school senior expecting to receive in another month, my graduation diploma...

[I]n the dark dawn of Feb. 7, 1974, before our graduating class could even start practicing for our graduation rites, the tranquility of the municipality of Jolo was shattered by a loud explosion that was clearly heard from one end of town to the other… Jolo became embroiled in a shooting war, house to house, door to door, with the Moro National Liberation Front rebels, 'Lost Commands' as some MNLF apologists would later claim, initially marching into town to lay siege on the government army encampment at the town's airport. My family stayed in our San Raymundo house during most of the first two days of fighting, except for some uncles who ventured out into the streets to get some drinking water...

In the afternoon of the second day, everything else around the neighborhood broke loose, with mortars and gunfire screaming. From a high window at the back of the house, I watched the brittle nipa-thatch roofs of nearby houses catch the fireballs whooshing down from the sky. When it was all over, the only thing that remained of our house was the front stairs leading up to a charred front door that opened up to clear, blue sky…[S]everal days later…we made our way down from a government refuge hospital on our way to the dock of Jolo. We trudged through the center of town, through the smoking ashes of Jolo, passing by contorted, burnt shapes frozen in their final acts to reach for the sky from where they had fallen down at either side of the blackened asphalt roads…

I always gave Admiral Espaldon the benefit of the doubt since it was his naval boats that mercifully plucked us out of the teeming pier of Jolo island and transported us to Zamboanga City in mainland Mindanao. For most part of a night, we had to camp out at the open landings of the pier and wait there in the cold wind along with thousands of others in a scene played straight out of a movie.

Sadain Jr.'s narrative was cited by Dr. Michael Tan, former chancellor of University of the Philippines Diliman, in his article "From Jolo to Marawi":

At the same time, especially in times of war, people do remember restraint and kindness. Said Sadain, who was 15 at the time of the siege of his city, recalls the carnage—corpses in the streets covered with newspaper pages—as well as the efforts of Adm. Romulo Espaldon to save lives by sending in naval boats to pick up Jolo residents from the pier and transport them to safety in Zamboanga City.

— Michael L. Tan, Philippine Daily Inquirer, May 26, 2017

== Rehabilitation of Jolo ==
One month after the end of hostilities, the Inter-Agency Task Force for the Rehabilitation of Jolo was created by virtue of Memorandum Order No. 411, s. 1974, as amended by Memorandum Order Nos. 426 and 450, composed of an Executive Committee and eight subcommittees: Overall and Long-Term Planning (later the Committee on Master Planning); Land Inventory and Reconstitution of Land Titles; Physical Infrastructures; Housing; Relief; Relocation and Resettlement; Trade, Industry and Agriculture; Banking and Financial Services; and Logistics. On December 28, 1980, the Municipality of Jolo cited Rear Admiral Romulo Espaldon for his role in leading the task force in lifting the people of Jolo from the ruins.

== Portrayals in media ==
Journalist Criselda Yabes portrayed the burning of Jolo in her novel Below the Crying Mountain under the University of the Philippines Press in 2010. Yabes' novel won the University of the Philippines Centennial Literary Prize, and put Yabes on the Man Asia Literary Prize longlist.
