= List of torture methods used by the Marcos dictatorship =

Aspect of Philippines history

Various forms of torture were used by the Marcos dictatorship in the Philippines between the declaration of martial law in 1972 and the Marcos family's ouster during the People Power Revolution in 1986. These included a range of methods Philippine forces picked up during its long periods of colonial occupation under Spanish, American, and Japanese forces, but also a number of new methods arising from the modern technologies of the later 20th century. These included sexual assaults including rape and degradation; non-sexual physical tortures including variants of electrocution, waterboarding, suffocation, burning, and beating; and various forms of psychological torture.

== Documentation ==
Applying international political pressure on the Marcos administration, three Amnesty International missions were able to speak to political prisoners and release mission reports containing detailed descriptions of specific torture cases. The reports, released in 1974, 1975, and 1981 respectively have since become a major source of historical documentation regarding torture under Ferdinand Marcos' regime. Accounts were also gathered by Task Force Detainees of the Philippines, the World Council of Churches, the International Commission of Jurists, and other non-government organizations.

== Historical background ==
Ferdinand Marcos was nearing the end of his last constitutionally allowed term when he declared martial law in 1972. First elected president in 1965, he was already the first president to be elected to a second term. Marcos had won the 1969 campaign on the strength of a USD50 million spending spree on infrastructure designed to court voters, which forced him to take on a loan with the IMF whose requirements so destabilized the Philippine economy that the resulting inflation led to protests and general unrest from 1970 to 1972. Marcos blamed this unrest on the newly-formed Communist Party of the Philippines under Jose Maria Sison, despite both Philippine and American intelligence services noting that the communist situation in the Philippines was "normal" or at the lowest level of concern; and on a supposed "Islamic Insurgency", although the armed Moro National Liberation Front would not form until after Marcos' declaration.

For Marcos to continue to act as head of state, his declaration of Martial Law had to achieve seven objectives: 1. Control the military and police; 2. Control the Supreme Court; 3. Undermine the Philippine public's faith in democracy; 4. Exploit and abet lawlessness and instability; 5. Exaggerate the Communist threat; 6. Get political backing from the United States; and 7. Hijack the constitutional convention.

In support of these goals, Ferdinand Marcos' declaration of martial law in late September 1972 gave military officers "extraordinary powers" over the life and death of civilians without accountability," and branded opponents as either communists or communist sympathizers whether or not it happened to be true.

== Perpetrators ==
The 1976 Amnesty International Mission Report lists 88 government torturers by their initials, with ranks as junior as Sargeant and as high as Brigadier General. The units of the various perpetrators responsible for this torture were under the command of Juan Ponce Enrile in the case of the Philippine Army, and of Fabian Ver and Fidel Ramos in the case of the Philippine Constabulary (then still a part of the Military, rather than the civilian unit it is today). However, the reports of Amnesty International, Task Force Detainees of the Philippines, the World Council of Churches, etc, all assert the fact that the torture happened as a policy of state, meant to stifle opposition, demonstrate the power of the ruling regime, and terrify the population into inaction. In their 1984 report on "Torture in the 80s", Amnesty International expounds:

"Torture does not occur simply because individual torturers are sadistic, even if testimonies verify that they often are. Torture is usually part of the state-controlled machinery to suppress dissent. it is most often used as an integral part of a government's security strategy. Concentrated in the torturer's electrode or syringe is the power and responsibility of the state."

Journalist Raissa Robles later noted that although Amnesty International made President Marcos aware of the names of these perpetrators, only one of them was ever brought to court, and even he was not convicted; and that most of these individuals were eventually promoted despite Marcos' regular press announcements that supposed military torturers had been caught and tried.

== Specific methods ==
Various forms of torture were used by forces under the Marcos regime, usually combined with each other.

=== Physical torture ===
Physical torture was also often inflicted upon victims. Aside from deadly weapons, implements of torture included water, pliers, thumb tacks, ballpoint pens, and flat irons. Physical torture took the forms of:

- Beatings - Almost all who were tortured were subjected to beatings. Victims include Roland Simbulan, Julius Giron, Macario Tiu, Eugenio Magpantay, Joseph Gatus, Rev. Cesar Taguba, Reynaldo Guillermo, Alejandro Arellano, Charley Palma, Victor Quinto, Pedro de Guzman Jr., Reynaldo Rodriguez, Ma. Cristina Verzola, Armando Teng, Romeo Bayle, Agaton Topacio, Reynaldo Ilao, Erlinda Taruc-Co, Ramon Casiple, Winfiredo Hilao, Bernabe Buscayno, and Jose Maria Sison.
- Electric shock (also known as the Meralco / Hawaii Five-O treatment) - Where electric wires were attached to fingers, genitalia, arms, or the head of the victim. Victims include Etta Rosales, Charlie Revilla Palma, Wilfredo Hilao, Romeo Tolio, Reynaldo Guillermo, Alejandro Arellano, Victor Quinto, Pedro de Guzman Jr., Reynaldo Rodriguez, Julius Giron, Armando Teng, Santiago Alonzo, Romeo Bayle, Agaton Topacio, Neri Colmenares, Trinidad Herrera, and Marco Palo.
- San Juanico Bridge / air treatment / Higa sa Hangin (lit. lie down on the air) - Victim lies between two cots. If the victim's body falls or sags, he or she would be beaten. Victims include Jose "Pete" Lacaba and Bonifacio Ilagan.
- Truth serum - Victims include Pete Lacaba, Danilo Vizmanos, Fernando Tayag, Bernardo Escarcha, Julius Giron, and Victor Quinto.
- Russian roulette - A revolver with one bullet loaded is spun up, aimed at the head of the victim, and then the trigger pulled. Victims include Etta Rosales, Cesar Taguba, Carlos Centenera, Winifredo Hilao and Danilo Vizmanos.
- Pistol-whipping - Beating with rifle or pistol butts. Victims include Reynaldo Guillermo, Robert sunga, Joseph Gatus, Maria Elena-Ang and Nathan Quimpo.
- Water cure (also known as the Nawasa treatment) - Large amounts of water would be forced through the victim's mouth, then forced out by beating. Victims Include Judy Taguiwalo, Guillermo Ponce de Leon, Alfonso Abzagado, Andrew Ocampo, and Jose Maria Sison.
- Wet submarine - Victims' heads would be submerged in a toilet full of urine and excrement. Victims include Charlie Palma and Wenifredo Villareal.
- Dry submarine - Victims' heads would be inserted into plastic bags, causing suffocation. Victims include Rolieto Trinidad.
- Strangulation - Done by hand, electric wire or steel bar. Victims include Etta Rosales, Carlos Centenera, Willie Tatanis, Juan Villegas and Reynaldo Rodriguez.
- Ashtray - Cigarette burns would be inflicted on the victim. Victims include Marcelino Tolam Jr., Philip Limjoco, Charley Palma, Ma. Cristina Verzola, Reynaldo Rodriguez, Neri Colmenares, Ernesto Luneta, and Peter Villaseñor.
- Flat iron burns - Feet are burned with flat irons. Victims include Cenon Sembrano and Bonifacio Ilagan.
- Candle burns. Victims include Etta Rosales.
- Sinusunog na rekado (burning spices) or pepper torture - concentrated peppery substance placed on lips, ears and genitals. Victims include Rolieto Trinidad, Meynardo Espeleta. and Carlos Yari.
- Animal treatment - Victims are manacled and caged like beasts. Victims include Leandro Manalo, Alexander Arevalo, Manuel Daez, Marcelo Gallarin, Romualdo Inductivo, Faustino Samonte, Rodolfo Macasalabang. Others like Cesar Taguba was made to drink his own urine and Satur Ocampo was made to eat his own feces.
- Cold torture - Forcing victims to sit against air conditioners set on maximum while shirtless, or to sit or lie down on blocks of ice while naked (sometimes with electric wires). Victims include Rolieto Trinidad, Nestor Bugayong, Winifredo Hilao, Pete Villaseñor, and Judy Taguiwalo.
- Food deprivation. Victims include CPP founder Jose Maria Sison and Rev. Cesar Taguba.
- Pompyang (cymbals) / Telephone / Ear clapping - Victims include Charlie Revilla and Julius Giron.
- Putting bullets between fingers then squeezing the hands tightly - Victims include Erlene Dangoy.

=== Sexual torture ===
- Rape. Victims include Maria Cristina Pargas-Bawagan, Etta Rosales, and Erlene Dangoy.
- Gang rape. Victims include Hilda Narciso.
- Molestation. Victims include Judy Taguiwalo, Erlinda Taruc-Co and Cristina Pargas.
- Sticks inserted into penises. Victims include Bonifacio Ilagan.

=== Psychological torture ===
Among the forms of psychological torture performed were:

- Solitary confinement. Victims include Ninoy Aquino, Danilo Vizmanos, CPP/NPA leaders Victor Corpus, Bernabe Buscayno, and Jose Maria Sison, and World War II Hunter's Guerrilla forces commander Terry Adevoso, who was accused of plotting a coup.
- Sleep deprivation. Victims include Ninoy Aquino and Maria Elena-Ang.
- Playing loud, repetitive music. Victims include Ninoy Aquino.
- Forcing victims to strip naked. Victims include Virgillo Villegas, Maria Elena-Ang, Erlene Dangoy, and Monica Atienza.
