= Raissa Robles =

Filipino investigative journalist, author, and political commentator

Raissa Robles is a Filipino investigative journalist, author, and political commentator best known for her extensive coverage of Philippine politics, international relations, business, and the peace process in Mindanao, and as the author of the 2016 book "Marcos Martial Law: Never Again," an illustrated history which provides an overview of the atrocities of the Marcos Dictatorship.

Robles, who has been a Manila correspondent for the South China Morning Post since 1996, received the National Book Award for Non-Fiction Prose in English in 2017 the National Book Development Board and the Manila Critics Circle, and the International Award for Excellence in Journalism from the International Christian Organization of the Media (ICOM) in 2016.

== See also ==
- Pia Ranada
