= Dante Simbulan Sr. =

Filipino educator and author (1930–2024)

Dante C. Simbulan Sr.
- Born: Dante Cantos Simbulan; May 3, 1930; San Simon, Pampanga, Philippine Islands
- Died: October 12, 2024 (aged 94); Fairfax County, Virginia, U.S.
- Occupations: Soldier, academic, political scientist
- Known for: Advocating for social justice and critical scholarship on the Philippine socio-economic elite
- Children: Roland, Alfred, Dante Jr., Elizabeth, Josephine, Teresa, Erwin

Academic background
- Education: Philippine Military Academy (BS); University of the Philippines Diliman (MA); Australian National University (PhD)
- Thesis: A Study of the Socio-Economic Elite in Philippine Politics and Government, 1946-1963

Academic work
- Institutions: University of the Philippines, Australian National University, Ateneo de Manila University
- Notable works: The Modern Principalia: The Historical Evolution of the Philippine Ruling Oligarchy Whose Side Are We On? memoirs of a PMAer When the Rains Come, Will Not the Grass Grow Again?

Dante Cantos Simbulan Sr. (May 3, 1930 – October 12, 2024) was a Filipino educator, author, and military officer best known for his influential role as a voice of social conscience for the generation of cadets who studied at the Philippine Military Academy in the days just before the dictatorship of Ferdinand Marcos. Simbulan's influence and reputation led to his being held by the Marcos regime as a political prisoner at Fort Bonifacio and Camp Crame for three and half years without charges.

== Early life and education ==
Simbulan was born on May 3, 1930, at Barangay San Miguel, San Simon, Pampanga, to Ignacio Simbulan y de los Santos, also of San Simon, Pampanga, and Apolonia Cantos y Untalán, of Batangas City. He studied at the Philippine Military Academy, graduating in 1952. He pursued a Master of Arts in Political Science at the University of the Philippines Diliman. In May 1965, he completed his Doctor of Philosophy in Political Science at the Australian National University with a dissertation titled "A Study of the Socio-Economic Elite in Philippine Politics and Government, 1946–1963".

== Career ==
Simbulan entered the service of the Armed Forces of the Philippines after graduating in the PMA Class of 1952. He joined the Philippine Scout Rangers a year later, in 1953, as an intelligence officer.

Simbulan was increasingly disillusioned by what he experienced in the field, including financial practices which were unfair to the rank and file, lack of respect for AFP personnel by American forces stationed in the Philippines at the time, and the fact that people ran away in fear whenever soldiers arrived in their villages. He accepted an invitation to become an instructor at the PMA in 1955.

During this time he became a strong influence on a number of cadets who later played significant roles in Philippine history, including Victor Corpus and Crispin Tagamolila, who would defect to the New People's Army; and Rodolfo Biazon, who would become Armed Forces of the Philippines Chief of Staff and later a two-term Senator. Simbulan was also known for inviting Communist Party of the Philippines chair Jose Maria Sison to deliver a lecture at the PMA titled "The mercenary tradition of the Armed Forces of the Philippines".

Despite already being a full colonel, Simbulan resigned his commission and his teaching post in the years leading up to martial law. To make a living, he took various teaching posts at the Ateneo de Manila University, Maryknoll College (now known as Miriam College), the University of the Philippines, and the Philippine College of Commerce (now Polytechnic University of the Philippines), where he eventually became the dean of the Liberal Arts College.

He was imprisoned from June 26, 1974 to November 29, 1977. He went into exile for the rest of the Marcos administration.

Simbulan authored several books on Philippine political history, including his memoir Whose Side are We On?, which detailed the events leading up to the declaration of martial law from the perspective of a PMA insider, and his 2005 book The Modern Principalia: the Historical Evolution of the Philippine Ruling Oligarchy.

== Death ==
Simbulan died in Fairfax County, Virginia, on October 12, 2024, at the age of 94.

== See also ==
- Bonifacio Gillego
- Danilo Vizmanos
- Political detainees under the Marcos dictatorship
