= Marcos Soliman =

Philippine military officer

Director of the National Intelligence Coordinating Agency
- In office 1970–1972
- President: Ferdinand Marcos
- Preceded by: BGen. Segundo Gazmin, PA (Ret.)
- Succeeded by: Brig. Gen. Fabian Ver (NISA)
- In office 1961–1966
- President: Diosdado Macapagal
- Preceded by: Col. Nicanor Jimenez (Ret.)
- Succeeded by: MGen. Ismael Lapus, PA (Ret.)

Chief of the Manila Police Department
- In office May 10 – September 17, 1962
- Preceded by: Col. Napoleon D. Valeriano
- Succeeded by: Brig. Gen. Eduardo Quintos

Commander of the III PC Zone
- In office June 6, 1958 – July 6, 1959
- Preceded by: BGen. Cornelio Bondad
- Succeeded by: BGen. Vicente V. Luna

Superintendent of the Philippine Military Academy
- In office 1955–1957
- Preceded by: Lt. Col. Patricio Borromeo
- Succeeded by: Col. Oscar Rialp

Personal details
- Born: Marcos Gulapa Soliman; April 25, 1910 Candaba, Pampanga, Philippine Islands
- Died: 1972 (aged 61–62) Philippines
- Education: Philippine Military Academy

Military service
- Branch/service: Philippine Army
- Years of service: 1933-1960
- Rank: Brigadier General
- Commands: Headquarters, Philippine Army

Brig. Gen. Marcos Gulapa Soliman (April 25, 1910 – 1972) was a Philippine military officer who served as superintendent of the Philippine Military Academy, Commanding General of the Philippine Army, and upon leaving military service, chief of the National Intelligence Coordinating Agency. He is best remembered in history as the then-anonymous whistleblower who exposed the plans of then-Philippine President Ferdinand Marcos to place the Republic of the Philippines under Martial Law.

== Early life and education ==
Soliman was born on April 25, 1910, in Candaba, Pampanga. His parents were Candaba Police Chief Paulino Soliman and Concordia Gulapa-Soliman. His paternal family line is believed to be descended from Rajah Soliman, who was one of two paramount rulers of the Rajahnate of Maynila before European colonizers arrived in the Philippines.

He graduated from the Philippine Constabulary Academy in 1933, two years before it would be transformed into the Philippine Military Academy in 1935, via the Philippine Commonwealth's National Defense Act (Commonwealth Act No. 1).

== Military career ==
After his graduation as part of PMA class of 1933, he spent two years as a lieutenant in the 23rd Philippine Constabulary (PC) Company in Iloilo before being chosen to study in the Air Corps Flight School at Randolph Field, Texas. After a tour of field duty, Soliman was appointed commandant and training officer in various ROTC units, including those of the University of the Philippines, Far Eastern University, and the University of Santo Tomas.

When World War II broke out, Soliman initially became executive officer of the 81st Infantry Detachment, and later became that unit's acting commanding officer as they fought in Mindanao. After the surrender of Philippine forces at Bataan, Soliman refused to surrender and joined the Western Leyte guerilla forces as its chief of staff. Soliman joined his unit in conducting harassment action against Japanese Forces until he was captured by the Japanese on 8 January 1944. The Japanese shipped him back to Luzon, and then let him go, but he then conducted espionage work on the Japanese forces, went back into hiding, and joined Ramsys' guerilla forces as their intelligence officer.

After the war Soliman's military career included the positions of chief of plans, operations and training in the Armed Forces of the Philippines; chief of staff and deputy commander of the II Military Area; member of the SEATO Military Staff Planners; superintendent of the Philippine Military Academy; commanding general of the II Military Area; and commanding general of the Philippine Army.

== Role in exposing "Oplan Sagittarius" ==
A week before Philippine President Ferdinand Marcos declare martial law in September 1972, copies of the plan for its implementation were distributed to key officials within the Armed Forces. As a way of assuring that any whistleblowers could be easily identified, the copies of the plan were distributed with codeword titles taken from the different signs of the Zodiac. The copy marked "Sagittarius" was given to General Soliman, who commanded the National Intelligence Coordinating Agency at the time.

When Senator Ninoy Aquino exposed the existence of "Oplan Sagittarius" a week before martial law was declared, other generals were able to deny that they had heard of any operation under the said code title, and it was easy for Marcos to pinpoint General Soliman as the whistleblower who gave the information to Aquino.

Not long after the declaration of martial law, the Marcos-controlled press reported that Soliman had died of a heart attack, but it is believed that Marcos had ordered that he be killed. Marcos then dissolved the National Intelligence Coordinating Agency (NICA) and put a powerful super-agency, the National Intelligence and Security Authority (NISA) in its place, with General Fabian Ver in command.

== See also ==
- Martial law under Ferdinand Marcos
