= Danilo Vizmanos =

Filipino activist and retired captain of the Philippine Navy

Danilo Poblete Vizmanos
- Born: Danilo Poblete Vizmanos; November 24, 1928; Philippine Islands
- Died: July 23, 2008 (aged 79)
- Military career
- Allegiance: Philippines
- Branch: Philippine Navy
- Service years: 1951–1972
- Rank: Captain

Captain Danilo Poblete Vizmanos, PN, Ret. (November 24, 1928 — June 23, 2008) was a Filipino activist and retired captain of the Philippine Navy. He is best known for his resistance against the Martial Law regime of former Philippine President Ferdinand Marcos. On November 30, 2016, Vizmanos' name was engraved on the Wall of Remembrance of the Bantayog ng mga Bayani, which honors the martyrs and heroes who fought against the Marcos dictatorship.

== From WWII Guerrilla to US Merchant Marine Academy ==
During World War II, Vizmanos fought the Japanese occupation by doing intelligence work for the Hunters ROTC guerillas in his home province of Cavite. After this service, he was selected as one of 50 Filipinos who were sent to the US to be admitted to the US Merchant Marine Academy. Among his batchmates were later Philippine Navy Admiral Romulo Espaldon and later Polytechnic University of the Philippines (PUP, then known as the Philippine College of Commerce) president Nemesio Prudente.

== Service in the Philippine Naval Patrol ==
=== Early naval career ===
Vizmanos received his commission to serve in the Philippine Naval Patrol in 1951 and was immediately assigned to the government's campaign against dissidents in the areas of the Quezon and Bicol provinces.

Vizmanos had entered the Armed Forces of the Philippines during the height of the cold war, so the discourse of the time was highly polarized between those who held a western capitalist world view and those who held a socialist-influenced worldview. As the armed force of a "third world" country, the Armed Forces of the Philippines got caught in between, but leaned towards the West in light of its mutual defense treaty with the United States.

Early on in his naval career, Vizmanos grew concerned about the tendency of Philippine soldiers to flaunt their authority over civilians, seeing ita s inimical both to military discipline and to civil-military relations.

Vizmanos also became frustrated by the United States' practice of donating old equipment to the Philippine Navy in compliance with their obligations under the RP-US Military Assistance Agreement, noting that the practice led to significant costs in terms of repairs, and often led to accidents.

Later the Armed Forces of the Philippines would experience even more changes when Ferdinand Marcos became president and began cultivating close ties with select officers within the Philippine Military and promoting them to key positions in order to have a strong influence on the armed forces.

=== Office of the Inspector General ===
A promising officer, Vizmanos was later assigned to the Office of the Inspector General, eventually being given the post of aide-de-camp to the Navy Flag Officer in Command, and being groomed for promotion to the rank of Commodore.

During this time, however, Vizmanos became frustrated by corruption in the Armed Forces of the Philippines becoming aware of anomalous transactions, professional intrigue, and unproductive rivalries. He became particularly aware of intense power play between military personnel who had graduated from the Philippine Military Academy and those who had graduated elsewhere.

=== China Policy Thesis ===
Vizmanos became more widely known to the general public in 1971, when he had the rank of Navy Captain and enrolled in the National Defense College of the Philippines (NDCP). His NDCP thesis, which projected that the People's Republic of China (PROC) would eventually rise as a world power, controversially recommended that the Philippine Government recognize the PROC, shift its foreign relations towards diplomatic non-alignment, and formulate a new defense concept. The thesis was so controversial that it was widely cited by the media, and was met with hostility by more senior members of the Philippines' defense establishment, leading to Vizmanos' upcoming promotion to Commodore being held up by the higher ups.

== During the Martial Law years ==
=== Early retirement ===
A year after Vizmanos finished his NDCP thesis, Ferdinand Marcos declared Martial Law. Vizmanos, who felt that the declaration was contrary to the values he upheld as a soldier, filed for early retirement. This was approved five months later, and Vizmanos left the Military service.

=== Political detention ===
Knowing his convictions and seeing him as a potential threat, however, Marcos' 5th Constabulary Unit decided to detain Vizmanos a year later, in May 1974. He was interrogated, subjected to a truth serum treatment commonly used by the Military at the time, and kept in prison without charges for two years. He was moved to several different detention centers during this time, including a stint in Camp Crame, in the Youth Rehabilitation Center and Ipil Detention Center in Fort Bonifacio, and later at the Bicutan Rehabilitation Center. It was during this time as a political detainee that Vizmanos met numerous opposition figures who opposed the Marcos administration.

=== Post-detention activism ===
Upon his release, Vizmanos began playing a role in the opposition and had become one its leading figures by the time Marcos was ousted by the People Power Revolution in 1986.

== Post-Marcos activism ==
After Marcos went into exile, Vizmanos continued his activism and chair of the Samahan ng mga Ex-Detainees Laban sa Detensyon at Para sa Amnestiya (SELDA), which led in the filing of a class action suit against Marcos on behalf of 10,000 human rights violations victims. He also became a leading figure in progressive politics in the Philippines, becoming one of the leaders of the Partido ng Bayan and the Bagong Alyansang Makabayan, and continuing to write about Philippine political issues.

== Death and legacy ==
Vizmanos died from complications related to prostate cancer on June 23, 2008. On November 30, 2016, Vizmanos' name was engraved on the Wall of Remembrance of the Bantayog ng mga Bayani, which honors the martyrs and heroes who fought against the Marcos dictatorship.

== See also ==
- Bantayog ng mga Bayani
- Military history of the Philippines during the Marcos dictatorship
- Nemesio Prudente
- Romulo Espaldon
- Rogelio Morales
- Ramon A. Alcaraz
- Hunters ROTC guerillas
