= Joe Dizon =

Filipino activist and priest (1948–2013)

Personal details
- Born: Jose Pacturayan Dizon; September 29, 1948 Caloocan, Rizal, Philippines
- Died: November 4, 2013 (aged 65) Quezon City, Philippines
- Denomination: Catholic

Jose "Joe" Pacturayan Dizon (September 29, 1948 – November 4, 2013) was a Filipino priest and activist who fought against the dictatorship of then President Ferdinand Marcos.

Dizon led protest actions against government corruption and human rights abuses during martial law in the Philippines, political dynasties, and the pork barrel system. At protest rallies against the Marcos dictatorship, he would say mass to prevent violent dispersal by the government and to boost the morale of demonstrators. He actively campaigned for honest elections and helped form people's organizations in rural areas to support those dealing with land grabbing, military abuses, and hamletting.

He was spokesperson for the Estrada Resign Movement and Plunder Watch, which were instrumental in the EDSA 2 people's uprising that deposed then President Joseph Estrada. He also headed a movement to oust Estrada's successor, Gloria Macapagal Arroyo on allegations of corruption, electoral fraud, and human rights violations.

Bagong Alyansang Makabayan chairperson Dr. Carol Araullo described him as "an example of a progressive priest, an undisguised Leftist, and a national democrat since the darkest years of martial law who was able to relate to and bring into broad alliances even avowed anti-Left personalities such as conservative bishops, traditional politicians, the upper crust of society over popular issues."

He was "a shining example of a man-of-the-cloth who transcended the traditional role of a priest in Philippine society" whose lifelong mantra was "Sandigan ang masa; paglingkuran ang sambayanan" ("Rely on the masses; serve the people").

He died of complications from diabetes at the National Kidney and Transplant Institute on November 12, 2013, at the age of 65.

Dizon was awarded the Tji Hak-Soon Justice and Peace Award in South Korea. His name was added to the Bantayog ng mga Bayani Wall of Remembrance on November 30, 2017.

== Organizing fellow priests and nuns, 1960s ==
In the 1960s, he headed the Basic Christian Community-Community Organizing, a Catholic church program. He would later organize priests and nuns to push for the church's social justice agenda by convening the Solidarity Philippines and Clergy Discernment Group, an organization of priests and nuns. He is also credited with leading the establishment of the first Catholic parish in the Diocese of Imus dedicated to the first Filipino saint, Lorenzo Ruiz, in Aniban, Bacoor, Cavite, and serving as its first parish priest from 1988 to 1992.

== Political work during martial law ==
Dizon supported workers and campaigned for their right to organize unions, which were banned under the dictatorship. He provided facilities for secret meetings by the underground opposition and later became a key figure in organizations that openly protested the dictatorship. Dizon also led the Basic Christian Communities-Community Organizing in forming people's organizations in rural areas to fight abuses by the military, land grabbing, and hamletting (forced relocation).

At the 1975 La Tondeña workers' strike, Dizon supported workers' demands that casual workers be regularized and granted sick leave benefits. Police beat the striking workers with truncheons and shoved them into police buses to be detained. Dizon and Sister Mary John Mananzan led priests and nuns who boarded police buses to protect the arrested workers. The La Tondeña strike was noted for being the first big strike to be held under martial law and was the first major act of open resistance against the Marcos dictatorship.

Dizon became active in the Justice for Aquino and Justice for All movement to protest the 1983 assassination of Benigno Aquino Jr. During rallies, he would conduct mass to prevent violent dispersal by the government.

Through the Church-Labor and Church-Peasant conferences, he brought social issues to the attention of the Catholic Bishops Conference of the Philippines. He also became co-convenor of Solidarity Philippines and Clergy Discernment Group, an organization of priests and nuns, and election watchdog Kontra Daya.

== Anti-corruption campaign ==
Dizon was a key member of the Estrada Resign movement and Plunder Watch. Dizon formed Plunder Watch with Dr. Carol Araullo, Teddy Casiño, Rafael Mariano, Raymond Palatino, and Carmen Deunida.

Dizon and other leaders of the Estrada Resign Movement filed plunder charges against Joseph Estrada in 2001. Estrada was convicted of plunder in September 2007, a first against a former Philippine president. Dizon hailed the conviction as a step toward accountability and transparency in government.

== See also ==
- Religious sector resistance against the Marcos dictatorship
- Workers' resistance against the Marcos dictatorship
- Bantayog ng mga Bayani
