= Inday Espina-Varona =

Filipina journalist

- Born: Maria Salvacion Llavore Espina; Manila, Philippines
- Education: University of the Philippines Diliman
- Occupations: Writer; Editor; Columnist; Activist; Journalist
- Parent: Rolando Espina

Ma. Salvacion Espina Varona, more popularly known as Inday Espina-Varona is a Filipina journalist. She is the former Head of Regions for Rappler. She was formerly a senior contributing editor and a writer for ABS-CBN Integrated News & Current Affairs.

== Career ==
Inday Espina-Varona started her career as a reporter at the Visayan Times, a local newspaper from Bacolod. As associate editor and investigative news chief at the Manila Times, she directed a numerous projects that won awards, including a series about Filipino children who suffered from tuberculosis and the telecommunications firms who ignored a consumer's problems; battered women, prostituted children and the fall of the Moro Islamic Liberation Fronts.

She won the country's top prize for investigative journalism (2006) . for her series, "The Rape of World War II vessels in Philippine seas." She was also conferred the Canadian government's Marshall McLuhan Award for her work.

She also worked as a columnist for the Manila Times, and became editor-in-chief of Philippines Graphic newsweekly magazine wherein she wrote her JVO prize-winning series. She formerly headed the Bayan Mo, iPatrol, a netizen journalism unit of the ABS-CBN News from 2010 to 2013. She was also a senior contributor for UCANews and LiCASBNews, international Catholic news agencies. She has also served as country director for Change.org, the world's largest petition platform.

She became Chairwoman of the National Union of Journalists of the Philippines.

She was selected in 2005 as an international fellow of the John S Knight Professional Journalism Fellowships in Stanford University.

Inday won the Reporters Without Borders’ (RSF) Prize for Independence at the 2018 Press Freedom Awards. RSF’s Prize for Independence is awarded to reporters for resisting pressure in carrying out their work.

In the Philippines, she has won awards for her coverage of indigenous peoples and the LGBTQ+ community.

== Personal life ==
She was born in Manila, Philippines. She is one of the 11 children of the late Dr. Lourdes Llavore, a pediatrician and journalist Rolando "Rolly" Espina, who died on December 28, 2017.

In 2016, her verified account was disabled by Facebook without explanation. The National Union of Journalists of the Philippines (NUJP) said the blocking of Espina-Varona was made "at the behest of what are clearly enemies of the right to free expression and of a free press." Her account was soon restored.

She is both an anti-Marcos and anti-Duterte.

Espina-Varona is a cancer survivor.

== Political protests ==
Espina-Varona, together with Zena Bernardo, Jean Enriquez, Mae Paner founded the Babae Ako movement (transl. I'm a Woman movement; stylized as #BabaeAko) on May 20, 2018.

She is one of the convenors of the Movement Against Tyranny which was launched on August 28, 2017.
