= Jesus Antonio Carpio =

Filipino lawyer, journalist, educator, author and army officer

Jesus Antonio Matamorosa Carpio (October 25, 1931 – May 26, 2010, sometimes referred to as J. Antonio Carpio) was a Filipino lawyer, journalist, educator, author, and army officer best known for his term as director of the Philippines' National Bureau of Investigation from 1986 to 1989, and for his earlier work in resisting the authoritarian rule of Ferdinand Marcos - first as a radio commentator prior to the declaration of Martial Law, and then later as the Regional Coordinator for Bicol of the Free Legal Assistance Group; which provided legal support to the regime's political detainees.

== Family ==
On May 4, 1954, Carpio married Bernardita Alcantara Zalazar (1933–1994) of Lucena. They had 14 children, of which three were female and eleven were male. Two of his sons became priests and four of them became lawyers. His eldest daughter Dr. Maria Victoria Carpio-Bernido was honored as a 2010 Ramon Magsaysay Awardee alongside her husband Dr. Christopher C. Bernido for their work in science education.

== Education ==
Carpio studied law at the University of the Philippines College of Law for two years and then finished his studies at the San Beda College of Law. He took the bar exam in 1962 and placed 14th among all the examinees nationwide.

== Military service ==
Carpio spent his early professional years as an officer in the Philippine Army in the 1950s while he was taking up his law studies. He was first commissioned as a 2nd Lieutenant in 1953, and eventually rose through the ranks to become a Captain before he passed the bar exam in 1962. A 2025 ordinance honoring Carpio adds that he was promoted to the rank of Major in 1968.

== Law practice and journalism before martial law ==
When he became a lawyer, he practiced in the City of Naga where he put up an office. He also became a columnist and radio commentator.

== Martial law ==
=== Detention and FLAG ===
When Marcos placed the Philippines under Martial Law in September 1972, Carpio was one of many Bicolano journalists - the others included his friends Luis General, Jr., and Alfredo Tria - who were among the first to be jailed for having expressed opposition to Ferdinand Marcos' dictatorship.

After a few years as a political detainee upon Ferdinand Marcos' declaration of Martial Law during the early 1970s, Carpio became the Regional Coordinator for Bicol of the Free Legal Assistance Group (FLAG), a nationwide organization of human rights lawyers organized by former Senator Jose Diokno for the purpose of supporting the regime's human rights victims.

=== KMTD and the Daet Massacre ===
Carpio was jailed for a second time in July 1981, alongside civic leader Grace Vinzons Magana of Camarines Norte, because he was chair of the Kilusang Mamamayan para sa Tunay na Demokrasya (KMTD) which organized a 3,000-person protest that took place in Daet, Camarines Norte on June 14, 1981.

Some 30 troopers of the 242nd Philippine Constabulary (PC) company tried to stop the protest, but the demonstrators, composed mostly of farmers and their relatives, pleaded to be allowed to proceed. The soldiers responded by firing upon the protesters. When the soldiers ceased shooting. At least four of the marchers were killed on the spot and some 50 others were wounded, and Carpio and Magana were arrested.

The shooting came to be known as the Daet massacre.

After political pressure forced Marcos to release Carpio from jail, Carpio continued to resist the dictatorship as head of FLAG-Bicol.

== NBI directorship ==
When Marcos was finally deposed by the 1986 People Power Revolution, Corazon Aquino became president, and she appointed Carpio to become Director of the National Bureau of Investigation. In the three years where he served the agency, he sought to restore the damaged credibility of the agency.

Under his leadership, major reforms were put in place to make sure that the agency would stay true to its mandate. The NBI handled a number of prominent cases during his term: the Garchiterona Land Scam, the attempted ambush on Polytechnic University of the Philippines President Nemesio Prudente, the ambush of Dinaluphian, Bataan Mayor Jose C. Payumo Jr.; the assassination of former Amadeo, Cavite mayor Jeremias Villanueva; and the kidnapping and murder of Kilusang Mayo Uno (KMU) Chairperson Rolando Olalia and his driver Leonor Alay-ay.

== Later career ==
After his stint as Director of the NBI, Carpio went back to Naga to practice law, write for local newspapers, and go on the air as a radio commentator. He had a program on Radyo LV alongside his two close friends Luis General Jr. and Alfredo Tria, where they would regularly expose and denounce government abuses. The three came to be known as the "Trio los Panchos".

== As an author ==
Carpio published a book of poetry and prose, titled “Viva la Virgen! Verses & Poems & a Pinch of Prose" in 1995.

== Death ==
Carpio died at age 78 due to Parkinson's disease, and was buried in the city of Naga.

== Legacy ==
In 2023, Carpio was one of six people who were honored by having their names added to the inscriptions on the Wall of Remembrance at the Philippines' Bantayog ng mga Bayani, which honors the martyrs and heroes that fought the authoritarian regime of Ferdinand Marcos. The others honored during Carpio's batch included Ata Manobo triber leader Manuel “Buyog” Sampiano, and Carpio's close friend Luis General Jr. The formal citations for the heroism of Carpio and General Jr. were read by former Philippine vice president Leni Robredo during the conferment ceremony.

A section of Liboton street in Carpio's home city of Naga was renamed J. Antonio M. Carpio Street in his honor in 2025.

== See also ==
- Luis General, Jr.
- Bonifacio Gillego
- Rogelio Morales
- Danilo Vizmanos
- Nemesio Prudente
- Security sector governance and reform in the Philippines
- Journalism during the Marcos dictatorship
