= Rudy Romano =

Filipino priest and activist

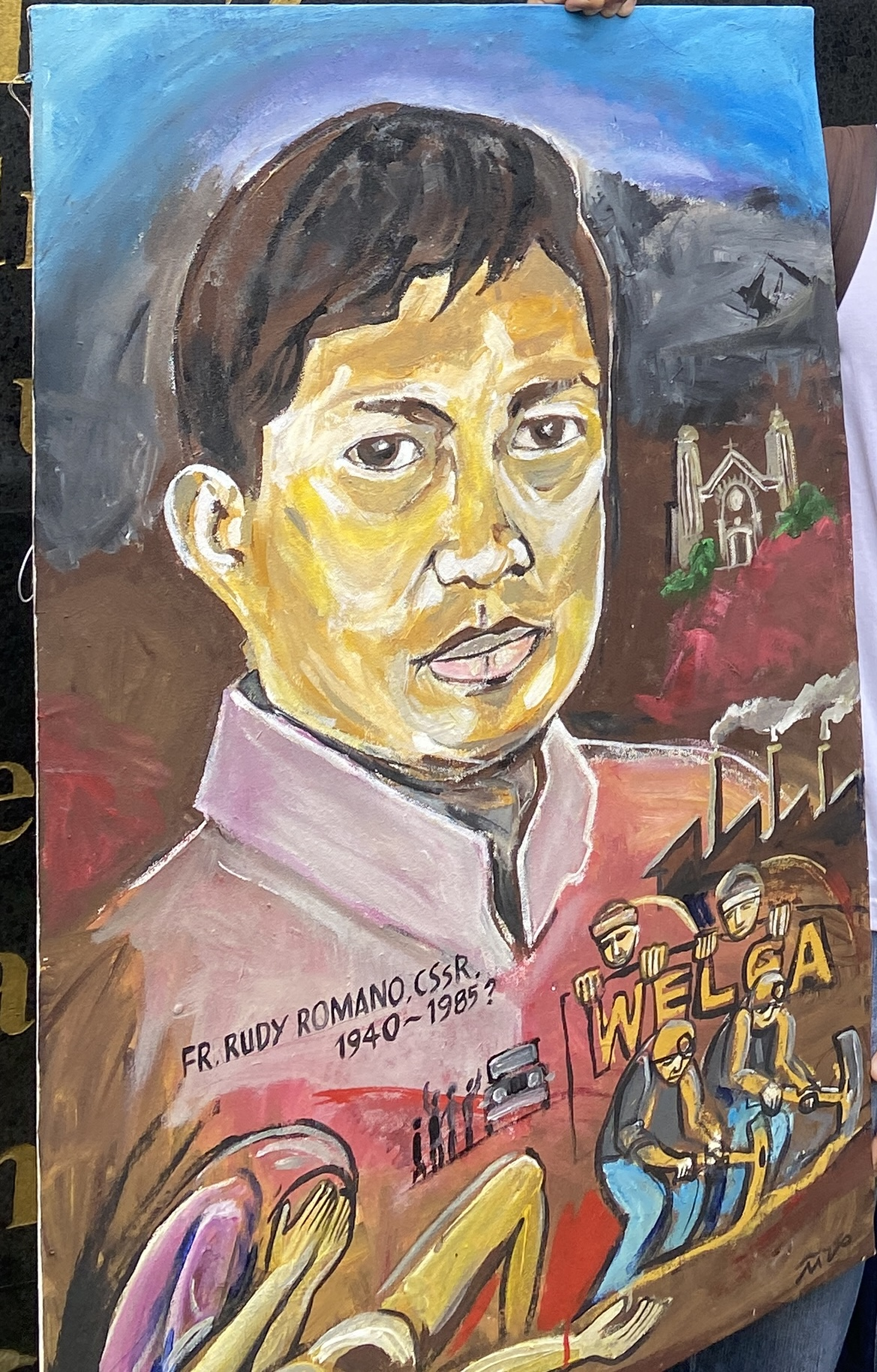
Portrait of Fr. Rudy Romano.

Rosaleo "Rudy" Boller Romano, C.Ss.R (born September 26, 1940) was a Filipino Redemptorist priest and a prominent martial law-era activist who served as the Vice President for Visayas of the Bagong Alyansang Makabayan (BAYAN) who was abducted by alleged armed state forces in Cebu City on July 11, 1985. His disappearance has become one of the prominent cases of enforced disappearances in the Philippines, with appeals even coming from Pope John Paul II.

== Early life ==
Eldest of ten children, Romano was born in Malate, Manila on September 26, 1940 to a family of affluent background. Their family moved to Villareal, Samar when World War II broke out. His father was a town mayor and owned 200 hectares of rice land.

== Priesthood ==
Romano was introduced to the Redemptorists doing missionary work in Samar, entering seminary at sixteen years old and becoming a Redemptorist on July 2, 1958. After studying in Bangalore, India, and Cebu, he was ordained a priest on December 20, 1964 and would serve as the Vocation Director for the Redemptorist Community of Cebu from 1975 to 1980. He also became known as a kind priest who was prolific in many skills.

== Activism ==
Working among impoverished communities brought Romano to the realities of social injustices especially during the Martial Law era. He spoke and dwell among poor communities in Cebu, Samar, Dumaguete, and Ilagan. He was active in incorporating social justice work in the efforts of the Church. This has put him on the eyes of the authorities. He spoke at many demonstrations against the dictatorship of President Ferdinand Marcos in Cebu City. In December 1979, he would be arrested for his involvement in a rally, and on December 15, 1980, he would be one of the organizers of a major rally in Fuente Osmeña. His involvements include being part of the Redemptorist Social Apostolate for the Urban Poor in Cebu, Task Force Detainees of the Philippines, executive secretary of Coalition Against People’s Persecution (CAPP), Vice President for Visayas of BAYAN, and chairperson of the Visayas Ecumenical Movement for Justice and Peace.

He helped established Alyansa sa Mamumuo sa Sugbo (AMA)-Sugbu, a labor union affiliated with the Kilusang Mayo Uno.

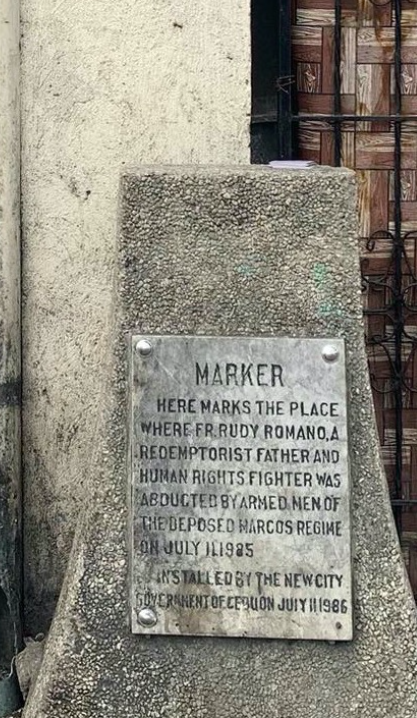
Marker in Tisa, Cebu, at the site where Romano was abducted.

== Disappearance ==
Romano was abducted by alleged state forces in Tisa, Labangon, Cebu City on July 11, 1985 and has never been seen since. He was seen by witnesses to be riding his blue motorcycle back to the Redemptorist convent near the city center. A white Ford Cortina, a government car, and some motorcycles were seen parked around the vicinity. Witnesses were stunned as Romano was seen being quickly shoved into the white car by seven to ten armed men in plain clothing. It was said that he was brought to Camp Lapu-Lapu.

Protests and campaigns were launched to pressure the authorities for his surface. Pope John Paul II was made aware of the situation and carried prayers for his return. A writ of habeas corpus was filed by former Senator Jose Diokno and a group of lawyers.

== Legacy ==
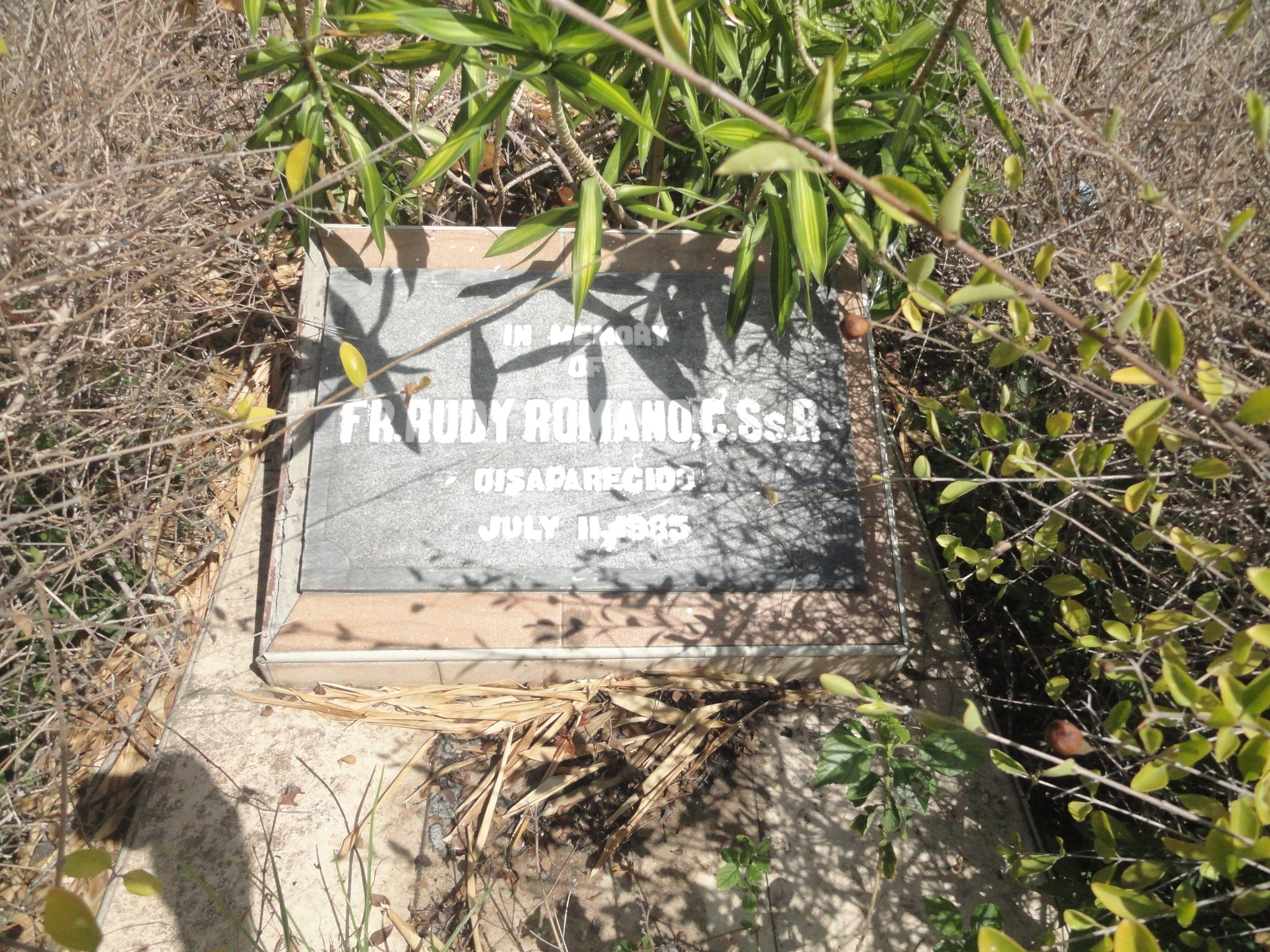
Cenotaph inside the Redemptorist compound, Cebu City.

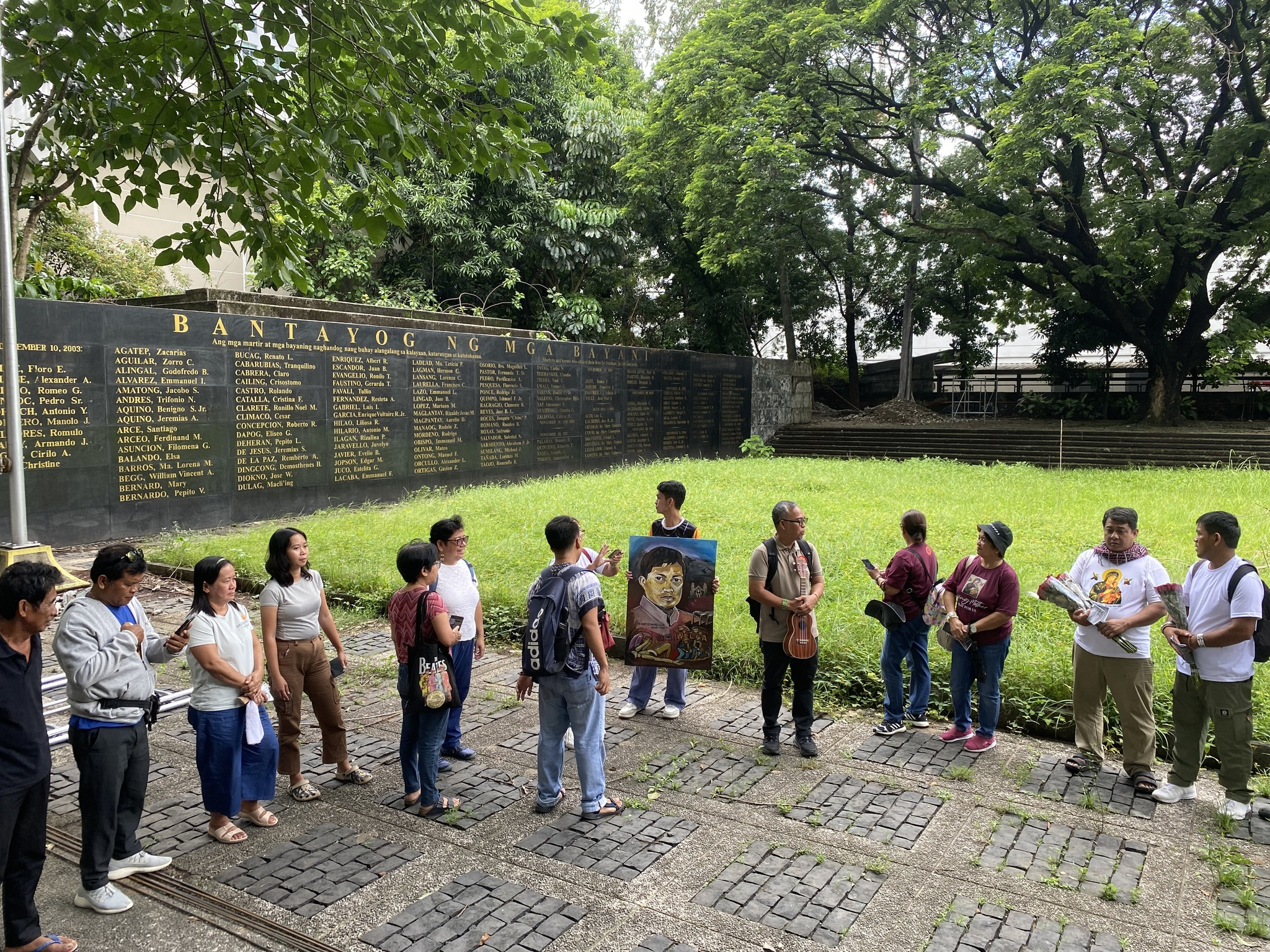
Commemorating Fr. Romano, July 11, 2025 at the Bantayog ng mga Bayani.

A memorial has been placed on the spot where he was abducted, and has since become a site of commemorations and memorials. A gravestone in his memory was also placed at the Our Lady of Perpetual Help Parish at the Redemptorist Compound in Cebu City. Within the seminary, the Regional Vocations Office was renamed as the “Fr. Rudy Romano Room.” He is among those listed on the Bantayog ng mga Bayani.

He was proclaimed as an adopted son of Cebu by the provincial government on August 5, 1987.

In 2020, Cebuano human rights advocates, headed by Movement Against Tyranny espoused citizens to "be like Fr. Rudy" to speak up and advocate against human rights abuses under former President Rodrigo Duterte.

Romano's image has been one of the continuous faces for the struggle of human rights in the Philippines, such as being an inspiration for Church-led rallies during the 2025 commemoration of the 1986 People Power Revolution.
