= Movement Against Tyranny =

Political movement

The Movement Against Tyranny, or MAT, is a Philippine movement that seeks to protest alleged acts of tyranny by the administration of Philippine President Rodrigo Duterte. It was launched on August 28, 2017, at the Maryhill School of Theology in Quezon City in the wake of the killing of 17-year-old Kian delos Santos. The group also protests killings associated with the Philippines' war on drugs and harassment of media organizations.

The group is a broad alliance that includes religious and political leaders, human rights advocates, activists, academics, lawyers, and journalists. The group's convenors include Congress Representative Antonio Tinio, former senator Rene Saguisag, former representatives Erin Tanada and Neri Colmenares, Bishop Broderick Pabillo, and Sister Mary John Mananzan. The group also includes University of the Philippines (UP) Chancellor Michael Tan, and journalist Vergel Santos of the Center for Media Freedom and Responsibility.

Also among the convenors are Free Legal Assistance Group national chair and law dean Chel Diokno, Carol Araullo of Bagong Alyansang Makabayan, National Union of People's Lawyers secretary general Edre Olalia, UP professors Rolando Simbulan and Julkipli Wadi, journalist Inday Espina-Varona, actors Mae Paner and Audie Gemora, Karapatan secretary general Cristina Palabay, and Edith Burgos, mother of missing activist Jonas Burgos.
