= Teodoro Casiño =

Filipino politician and activist

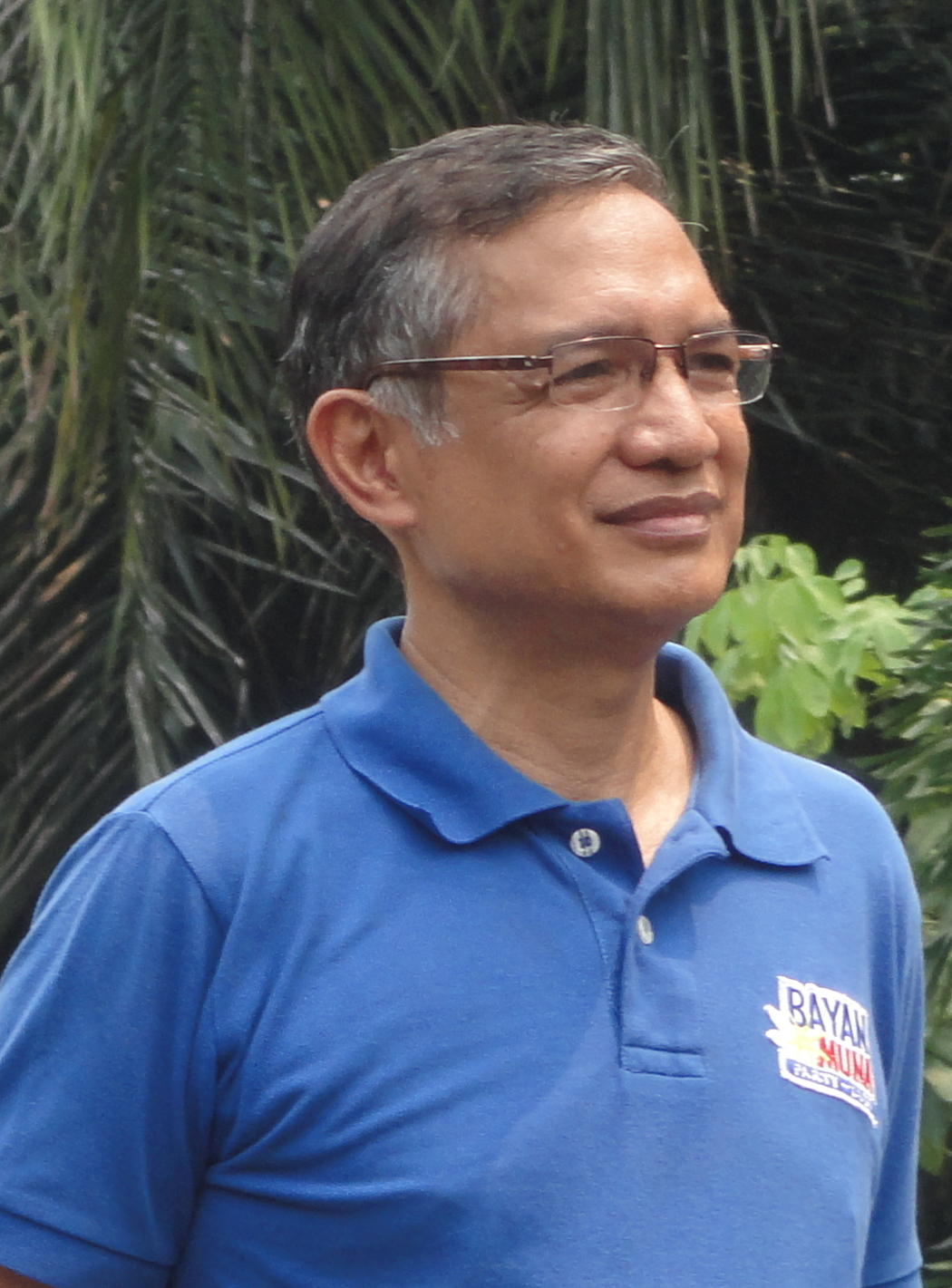
- Casiño in 2024

Chairperson of Bagong Alyansang Makabayan
- Incumbent
- Assumed office April 15, 2023
- Preceded by: Carol Araullo

Member of the House of Representatives for Bayan Muna Party-list
- In office June 30, 2004 – June 30, 2013 Serving with Neri Colmenares

Personal details
- Born: Teodoro Acevedo Casiño; November 15, 1968 (age 57) Davao City, Philippines
- Party: Bayan Muna; Bayan
- Other political affiliations: Makabayan (2009–present)
- Spouse: Ruth Cervantes
- Children: 2
- Education: La Salle Green Hills
- Alma mater: University of the Philippines Los Baños (BA Sociology)
- Profession: Writer, politician, journalist
- Website: myteddycasiño

Teodoro "Teddy" Acevedo Casiño (Tagalog pronunciation: [kaˈsɪɲo], born November 15, 1968) is a Filipino activist, writer, and journalist. He was a member of the House of Representatives for Bayan Muna. He is currently the chairperson of Bagong Alyansang Makabayan (Bayan).

== Early life and education ==
Born in Davao City to middle-class parents, Casiño finished elementary education at De La Salle University (DLSU) in 1982. He continued his high school studies at La Salle Green Hills, where his stint as a volunteer for the National Movement for Free Elections (NAMFREL) in the 1986 snap elections swept him into the politics of People Power via the EDSA Revolution.

The EDSA experience, plus the stories about hunger in Negros, moved him to forego a DLSU scholarship to study agriculture at the University of the Philippines Los Baños (UPLB), where he became an activist in his freshman year. He became editor-in-chief of the student paper, The UPLB Perspective, from 1989 to 1991, even as he consistently made it to the honor roll.

In 1991, Casiño was elected national president of the College Editors' Guild of the Philippines (CEGP), an alliance of over 700 student publications nationwide. He chose to delay his thesis requirement to work full-time for the CEGP. He eventually graduated from UPLB with a degree in BA Sociology in 1993, with his thesis bringing him to Pamplona town in Cagayan Valley, where he studied the impact of Church activism on rural communities.

== Career ==
=== Activism ===
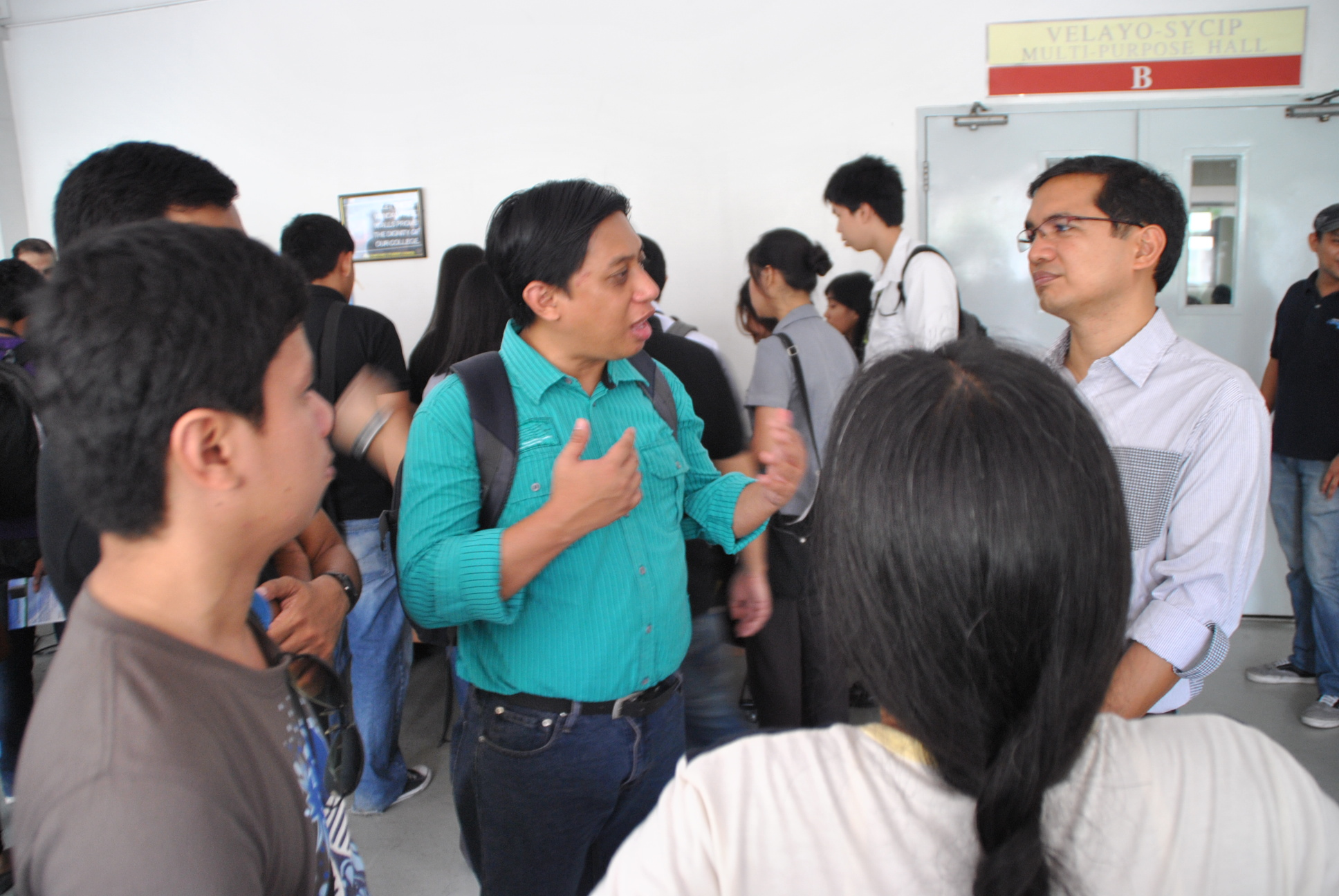
Teddy Casiño (far right with eyeglasses) listens to members of Wikimedia Philippines and OpenStreetMap Philippines during a Software Freedom Day event in 2011 at University of Santo Tomas.

After his stint in the student movement, Casiño joined the Kilusang Mayo Uno (May First Movement; KMU). His childhood ambition and his father's wishes for him to become a lawyer gave way to his activism. In 1996, he entered the University of the Philippines College of Law but left three days later when it interfered with his work in the KMU.

After four years in the KMU, he joined the Bagong Alyansang Makabayan (New Patriotic Alliance; Bayan), the largest alliance of progressive people's organizations in the country. He was elected secretary general in 1999 and was catapulted to national prominence in 2001 as one of the youngest leaders of EDSA II.

Casiño was appointed commissioner of the EDSA People Power Commission but was removed for constantly being critical of the administration. He had a short stint in ABS-CBN's Hoy Gising! and The Correspondents. In 2002, he was accorded the UPLB Distinguished Alumni Award for Extension.

As a writer, Casiño was a regular contributor to the Philippine Daily Inquirer's Youngblood column from 1994 to 1996. In 1995, he became a regular columnist for Business World, one of the most respected business newspapers in the country. He also wrote columns for the tabloids People's Bagong Taliba and Frontpage, the OFW weekly Pinoy Gazette, and the online magazine Bulatlat.com.

In April 2023, Bagong Alyansang Makabayan held its 10th National Congress, in which Casiño was elected Chairperson. He succeeded Carol Araullo, who had been the Chairperson since Bayan's 2009 Congress.

On December 4, 2024, Casiño and 74 others filed the second impeachment complaint against Vice President Sara Duterte, citing betrayal of public trust for her office's alleged misuse of confidential funds. By February 2025, it was consolidated with two other complaints into a single impeachment complaint and signed by 240 lawmakers out of 305, reaching the 1/3 vote threshold and impeaching Vice President Duterte.

On January 26, 2026, Casiño and 35 others filed the second impeachment complaint against President Bongbong Marcos, citing his potential involvement in the "BBM Parametric Formula" used by the Department of Public Works and Highways, which they alleged to have allowed systemic corruption in government, as well as his alleged involvement in kickback schemes and unprogrammed appropriations.

== Legislative career ==
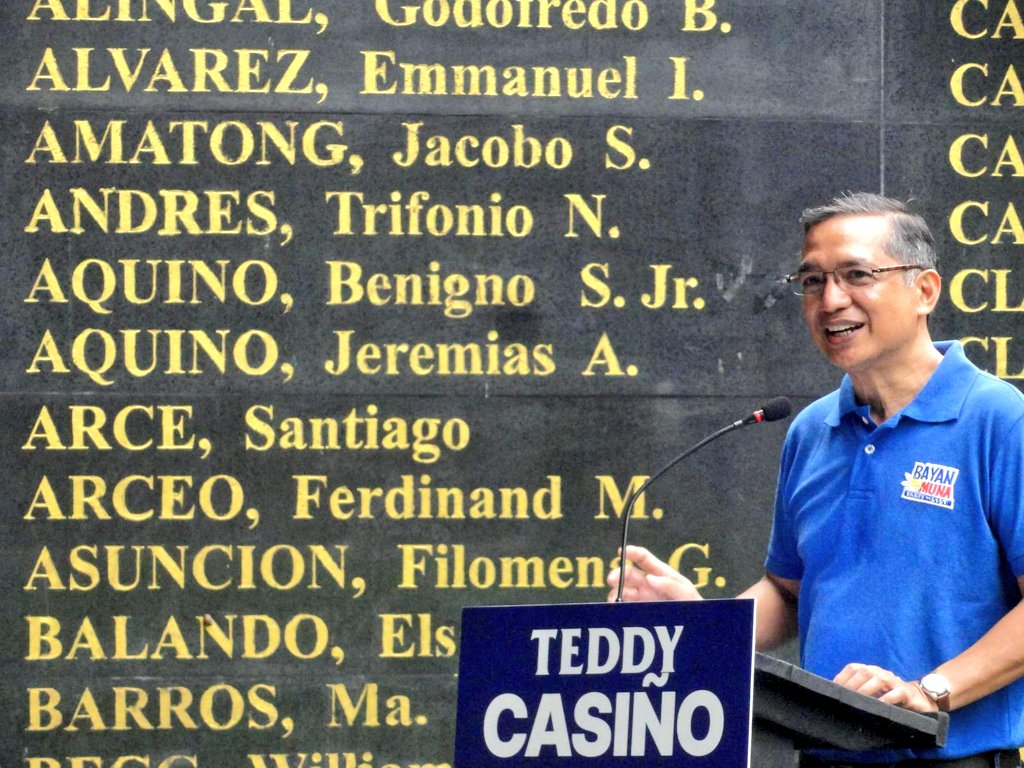
Teddy Casiño announcing his senatorial bid for 2025.

In the May 2004 elections, Casiño was elected as Bayan Muna's representative in Congress. With the re-election of Bayan Muna in the 2007 partylist polls, he returned to Congress.

In 2013, Casiño ran for the Senate as an independent, nominated by the Makabayan bloc and receiving the support of Senator Bong Revilla. He failed to win a Senate seat after finishing 22nd overall in the vote tally.

Casiño ran again during the 2025 elections under the 11-person Makabayan bloc senatorial slate and failed to win as well, placing 32nd in the vote tally, the highest amongst the bloc's candidates.

=== 15th Congress ===
In the 15th Congress, Casiño became the chairman of the Committee on Small Business and Entrepreneurship Development, where he championed the welfare of micro, small, and medium enterprises. As chairperson of the Committee, Casiño also spearheaded "Buy Pinoy, Build Pinoy!"—a grassroots campaign promoting the consumption of Filipino-made products and the development of integrated, world-class Filipino industries.

He is also senior vice chairperson of the Committee on Higher and Technical Education, safeguarding the youth's right to affordable and quality education.

==== Authored laws and bills ====
===== Laws =====
Casiño is one of the principal authors of four laws that have benefited the poor and marginalized sectors, namely:

1. The Public Attorneys Act of 2007 (R.A. 9406), which strengthened the Public Attorneys Office and expanded its free legal services to poor litigants;
2. The Tax Relief Act of 2009 (R.A. 9504), which exempts minimum wage earners from withholding taxes;
3. The Rent Control Act of 2009 (R.A. 9653), which put a cap on rent for low-income earners;
4. The Anti-Torture Act of 2009 (R.A. 9745), which penalizes torture.

Aside from this, he has authored a total of 178 authored and 376 co-authored measures, making him the 4th most prolific congressman in the 15th Congress.

===== Bills =====
Casiño's main advocacy is the lowering of prices of electricity, oil, and water, as well as the regulation of the cost of education, healthcare, mobile communications, toll fees, and other basic utilities and services. Towards this end, he has filed bills on:

1. The removal of VAT on power (HB 2719), oil (HB 1630), and toll fees (HB 5303);
2. The regulation of oil prices (HB 4355), mobile phone services (HB 5653), tuition fees (HB 1961), and interest rates (HB 4917).

He has consistently opposed budget cuts in Philippine state colleges and universities, as well as the privatization of public hospitals and water districts.

As a relentless fighter of corruption and government abuse, Casiño is also the principal author of:

1. The Whistleblowers Protection and Rewards Bill (HB 132),
2. The Freedom of Information Bill (HB 133),
3. The Anti-Dynasty Bill (HB 3413),
4. The House version of the Anti-Epal Bill (HB 2309).

== Electoral history ==
Electoral history of Teodoro Casiño
Year	Office	Party	Votes received				Result
Year	Office	Party	Total	%	P.	Swing	Result
2004	Representative (Party-list)	Bayan Muna	1,203,305	9.46%	1st	—N/a	Won
2007	Representative (Party-list)	Bayan Muna	979,189	6.11%	2nd	-3.35	Won
2010	Representative (Party-list)	Bayan Muna	750,100	2.49%	9th	-3.62	Won
2022	Representative (Party-list)	Bayan Muna	225,509	0.60%	39th	-1.89	Lost
2013	Senator of the Philippines	Makabayan	4,295,151	10.70%	22nd	—N/a	Lost
2025	Senator of the Philippines	Makabayan	4,648,271	8.10%	32nd	-2.60	Lost
