= Bulacan Martyrs =

1982 killing of youth activists in the Philippines

- Bulacan (Philippines)
- Location: Bulacan, Philippines
- Date: 21 June 1982
- Attack type: Soldiers raided the farmer house and massacred a group of youth activist
- Deaths: 5
- Perpetrator: Soldiers of the 175th Philippine Constabulary (PC) Company

The Bulacan Martyrs of 1982 were five young activists, Danilo Aguirre, Edwin Borlongan, Teresita Llorente, Renato Manimbo, and Constantino Medina, who worked together to oppose the Ferdinand Marcos dictatorship and restore democracy in the Philippines. They were meeting at a farmer's residence on June 21, 1982, when the house was raided by 30 armed soldiers from the 175th Philippine Constabulary (PC) Company. They were arrested and were found dead the following day in another town 20 kilometers away.

At the time of their deaths, the Bulacan Martyrs were helping farmers organize themselves to push for the implementation of an agrarian reform program.

The names of these young activists were added in 2012 to the Bantayog ng mga Bayani's Wall of Remembrance.

== Background ==
A group of young activists were trying to help farmers organize themselves in the province of Bulacan. They were trying to form a local chapter of Alyansa ng Magbubukid sa Gitnang Luson (AMGL), a militant farmers’ alliance based in Central Luzon.

AMGL had organized a series of actions to demand that the government implement an agrarian reform program. AMGL was then a new organization looking for volunteers to help form a chapter in Bulacan. The Philippine military was in control of the province and martial law was in full effect throughout the country under then-president Ferdinand E. Marcos. Bulacan landowners had been using private armies to harass farmers. Organizing was a dangerous activity at the time.

Danilo Aguirre, Edwin Borlongan, Teresita Llorente, Renato Manimbo, and Constantino Medina all volunteered to help organize a Bulacan chapter for AMGL. They had been meeting to evaluate their organizational work and plan a program of action when they were arrested on June 21, 1982, and killed. The bodies of Borlongan and Manimbo were found three days later; the bodies of Aguirre, Llorente, and Medina were found 10 days after the incident. Their bodies all showed heavy bruises and multiple gunshot wounds.

Another companion was able to escape arrest.

Martyr's Lives

Danilo Aguirre

- Came from a family of market vendors and grew up in Meycauayan. Growing up, he was an active member of a parish-based group. Later on, he ended up joining church groups that included activities to make citizens aware of their rights, and even participating in protest rallies about Marcos’ dictatorship. Alyansa ng Magbubukid sa Gitnang Luson, or AMGL, was looking for volunteers in Bulacan to implement a project and asked for appropriate actions to demand agrarian reform to protect farmers' rights. Upon hearing the news that AMGL was looking for volunteers, he offered himself.

Edwin Borlongan

- Came from a family with a fisherman and a seamstress as his parents and grew up in Malolos. Later, he moved to Manila to take an automotive repair course and earned a living as a driver-mechanic for his uncle in Tondo. In 1987, he participated in the Metro Manila noise barrage, and through this experience, he felt a sense of national pride and decided to become more involved in national issues and those affecting students like him. Back in Bulacan, he served as a catechist in a parish and was an active member of the Pamparokyang Samahan ng mga Katekista (PKKK). In 1981, he heard that AMGL was looking for volunteers to implement the new plan, and right there he put his name in.

Teresita Llorente

- Grew up in Meycauayan in a business-centered family, having owned their own small restaurant. A member of the parish choir and joined PKKK, which focused on social action and justice work. These PKKK seminars would be the path to her enlightenment on the country’s pressing issues. Later, she participated in and aided in a feeding program for the families of strikers. Because of her exposure to the strikers, she felt compelled to do more.

Renato Manimbo

- His family originated from Candaba, Pampanga, but then they relocated to Bulacan after his uncle, who was working as a government agent, was shot by armed men. He was sent to FEATI University in Manila to study mechanical engineering. In 1978, there was an upsurge in student protests over issues surrounding tuition fee increases and students' rights and welfare. Later, he became involved in campus politics and served as FEATI’s student council president for 2 years, eventually participating in rallies to denounce Marcos’ dictatorship. He has been sharing with those he knows the injustices engulfing the country and the conditions he’s been seeing. Eventually, he pursued activism and became a founding member of the League of Filipino Students (LFS), where they organized relief operations for typhoon victims in Central Luzon. When he heard that AMGL was looking for volunteers, he wanted in.

Constantino Medina

- Grew up in Sagrada Familia, Hagonoy, with a fishpond-tending father and a housewife mother. In the late 1970s’, Bulacan had a group called Galian sa Arte at Tula (GAT) where these artists would bring their neighbors to watch free plays in Manila by the Philippine Educational Theater Association (PETA). He was one of them, and through these plays came his enlightenment to the harsh reality in Philippine society. He began joining different rallies later on. The fifth in the group that entered AMGL’s volunteer project in Bulacan.

== Arrest and death ==
Details of the arrest and death of the Bulacan Martys were documented by human rights group Task Force Detainees. The members of the group were meeting at a farmer's house when they heard shouts telling them not to move and telling them that the house has been surrounded. Some 30 heavily armed members of the 175th Philippine Constabulary (PC) entered the house. One member of the group climbed out the window and hid himself on the roof. The rest of the group readily surrendered.

In San Rafael, a town 20 kilometers away, people found the bodies of the five organizers riddled with bullet holes in a corner of the municipal hall. The PC soldiers said the five were killed in an encounter. Municipal hall employees raised money among themselves to buy caskets for the five and a pair of jeans for the body of the woman who was in pajamas. The bodies were buried that afternoon.

The member of the group who was able to escape went to the victims' relatives and told them of the raid. He still did not know that his companions had been killed. The relatives went to the PC camp and were told that the five organizers were not under their custody. The families learned of the deaths the following day.

== Aftermath ==
The families of the victims met with the local PC authorities to retrieve the family of their loved ones. The families of Borlongan and Manimbo were given the run-around and complied with several demands, including paying a fee, before they managed to recover the bodies of the two on June 26, five days after the incident. Three days later, the families met with the Malolos diocese bishop Cirilo Almario, Jr., congressman Rogaciano Mercado, and Rev. Edgardo Villacorte to discuss the incident. After providing their testimonies, they implored Bp. Almario and Rev. Villacorte, who was part of the Church-Military Liaison Committee (CMLC) to help them retrieve the bodies and seek the truth by facilitating a dialogue with the local PC unit.

The meeting took place on July 1, and it was attended by the PC's Provincial Commander and Bulacan's Police Superintendent, along with one of the PC captains implicated in the incident. They insisted that what happened was an encounter between the government troops and terrorists. Both sides unmoving in their version of the events, the family opted to request the PC's authorization to have the bodies exhumed. They were redirected to the provincial health officer, then to a municipal judge, before finally being able to retrieve the bodies of the remaining three victims.

By midnight of July 2, ten days after the incident, they were able to place the bodies in sealed coffins for a short period of mourning at the Barasoain Church in Malolos for relatives and sympathizers. Nine priests said mass for the last three bodies that were recovered. The bodies were buried at the Meycauayan Cemetery. Not long after, the AMGL chapter that the Bulacan martyrs formed began to take root in the province. Church and human rights groups in Bulacan began a campaign to press for justice for the slain activists. Despite these efforts, the suspected perpetrators of the killings are not known to have ever been prosecuted. When Benigno Aquino Jr. was assassinated the following year, residents of Bulacan took part in the protest, recalling the recent deaths of the young Bulacan martyrs.

== Members ==
- Aguirre, Danilo
- Borlongan, Edwin De Guzman
- Llorente, Teresita Evangelista
- Manimbo, Renato Turla
- Medina, Constantino Reyes

== See also ==
- Bantayog ng mga Bayani
- Workers' resistance against the Marcos dictatorship
