= Epal (politics) =

Terminology in Philippine politics

Epal in the context of Philippine politics is a pejorative used for politicians who habitually associate their name and/or likeness in government-funded projects.

== Etymology ==
"Epal" is a Filipino-language colloquial term for "mapapel", for attention grabbers, scene stealers, or people who crave a role (papel) in affairs that are not necessarily theirs to handle or decide.

== Practice ==
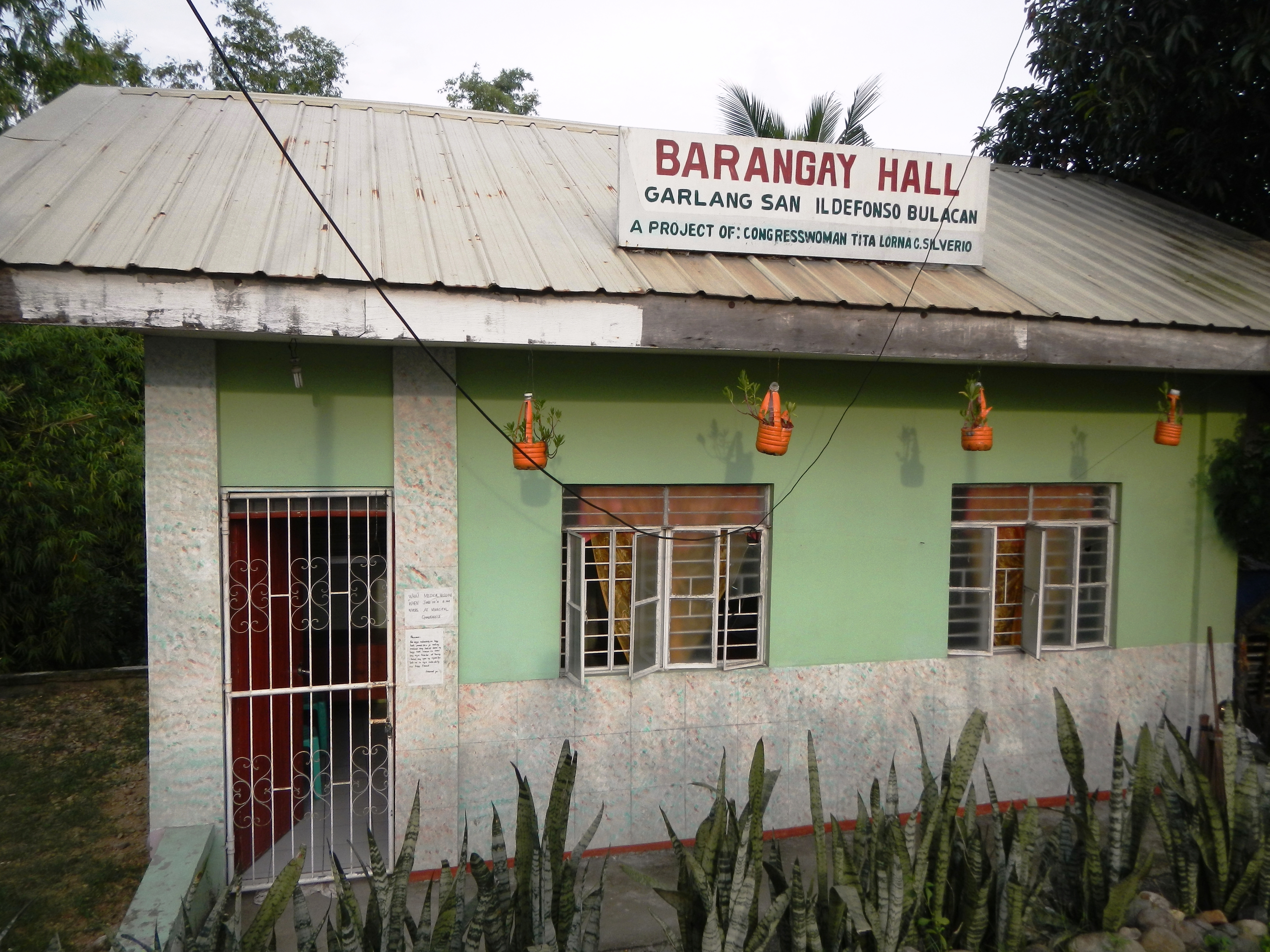
The name of a congresswoman is included in a barangay hall signage in San Ildefonso, Bulacan.

What constitute as an epal act could vary. This could include placing the likeness and/or names of politicians and their relatives in:

- Names of infrastructure projects
- Signage
  - Greetings for special occasions such as holidays and fiesta.
- Financial aid and relief goods
- Public documents such as license, permits, and certificates

Politicians could also name projects after their initials or acronym of their names. (e.g. Ginintuang Masagana Ani farming program of President Gloria Macapagal Arroyo)

It can be used as a means for premature campaigning for upcoming elections. Critics argue that associating politician's names and likenesses to government projects is contrary to the idea that such projects are funded by the taxpaying public.

Quezon representative Danilo Suarez has defended the practice as necessary so that local politicians' constituents are informed that their officials are fulfilling their mandate. Education Secretary Armin Luistro in 2013 said he has no problem with politicians plastering their names and signages on public school projects since the same politicians would be held accountable to the Commission on Audit if their implementation were found to be substandard.

== Policy ==
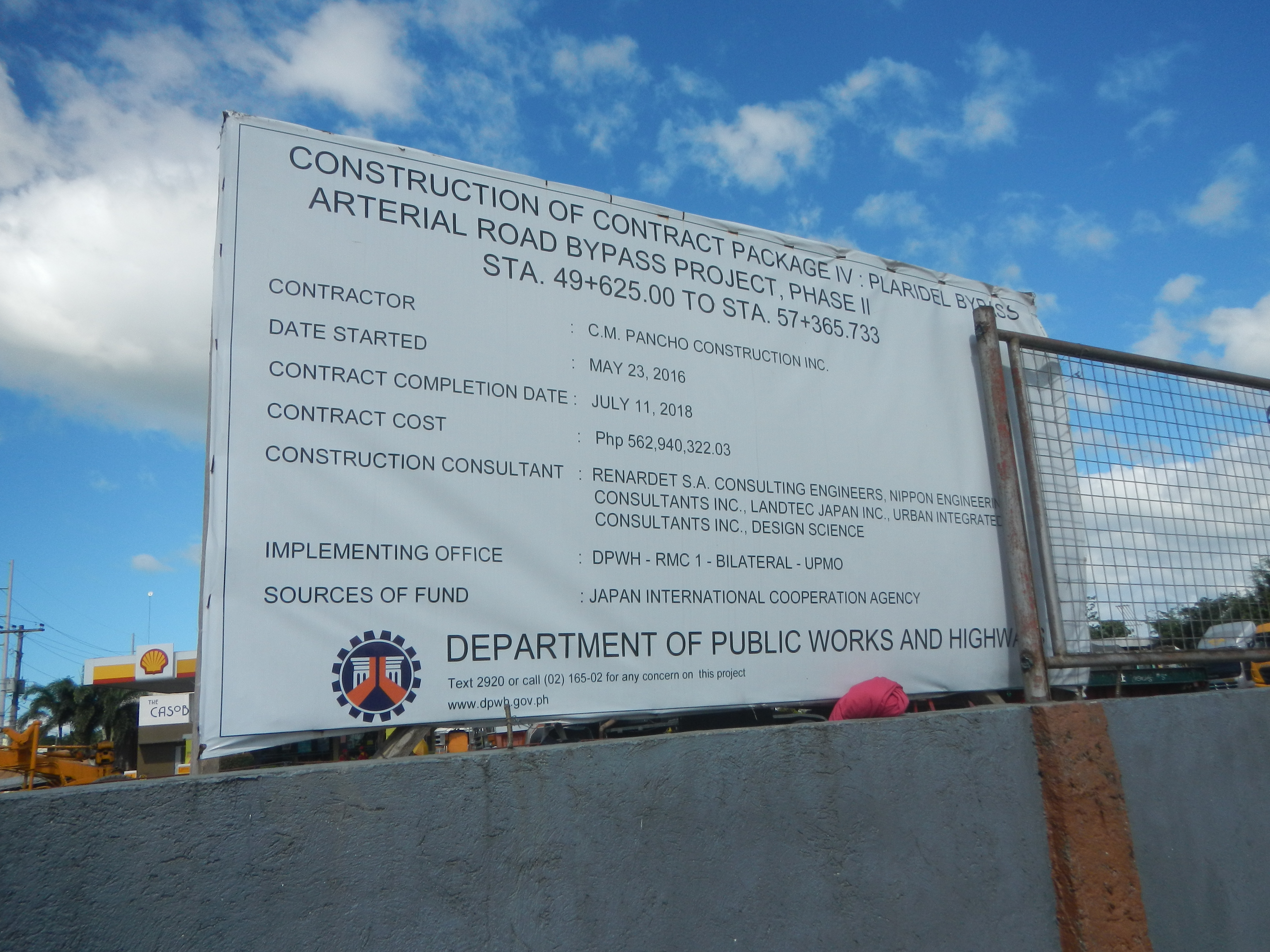
Tarpaulin showing details of a road construction project under the Department of Public Works and Highways (DPWH). The signage lacks credit to any person associated with the DPWH or any other government official.

The Department of the Interior and Local Government (DILG) and the Commission on Audit has policies in place against placing names, initials, and images of government personalities on government projects, signage, and properties. The anti-epal policy is laid out in DILG Memorandum Circular No. 2010-101 issued during the tenure of Secretary Jesse Robredo.

== Legislation ==
There has been multiple attempts to pass a dedicated law against epal practices in the Philippine Congress. Defining what should constitute epal acts has been one of a challenge in passing an anti-epal legislation.

=== Provision in the 2021 budget act ===
Senator Grace Poe was able to introduce General Provision No. 82, which has measures against epal, in the General Appropriations Act (GAA) of 2021. The provision prohibits any public official, whether elected or appointed to "affix, or cause to be affixed, their name, visage, appearance, logo, signature or other analogous image, on all programs, activities, projects (PAPs), or corresponding signage" of projects funded under the act.

=== Proposed legislation ===
==== Senate ====
Bill No.	Congress	Dated filed	Principal author	House of Representatives counterpart	Scope	Ref.
Senate Bill No. 1668	13th	August 4, 2004	Miriam Defensor-Santiago	House Bill No. 5497	Anti-Signage of Public Works Act; Name and image of public officials (elected and appointed) on signage of public works	
Senate Bill No. 1340	14th	June 24, 2007	Miriam Defensor-Santiago	House Bill No. 2026	Anti-Signage of Public Works Act; Name and image of public officials (elected and appointed) on signage of public works	
Senate Bill No. 1967	15th	July 22, 2010	Miriam Defensor-Santiago	House Bill No. 2309	Anti-Signage of Public Works Act; Name and image of public officials (elected and appointed) on signage of public works	
Senate Bill No. 54	16th	July 1, 2013	Miriam Defensor-Santiago	House Bill No. 4929	Anti-Signage of Public Works Act; Name and image of public officials (elected and appointed) on signage of public works	
Senate Bill No. 776	17th	July 21, 2016	Chiz Escudero	—N/a	Naming of government projects after government officials and other persons associated with said officials except instances identified by the National Historical Commission of the Philippines	
Senate Bill No. 1445	20th	October 7, 2025	Erwin Tulfo	—N/a	Name of financial assistance individual	

==== House of Representatives ====
Bill No.	Congress	Dated filed	Principal author	Constituent	Senate counterpart	Scope	Ref.
House Bill No. 5497	13th	May 30, 2006	Teddy Casiño	Bayan Muna	Senate Bill No. 1968	Naming of public properties and government services after incumbent elected public officials, their kin, spouses and relatives of up to fourth civil degree of consanguinity. Naming includes naming projects after one's moniker and initials.	
House Bill No. 2026	14th	August 13, 2007	Teddy Casiño	Bayan Muna	Senate Bill No. 1340	Naming of public properties and government services after incumbent elected public officials, their kin, spouses and relatives of up to fourth civil degree of consanguinity. Naming includes naming projects after one's moniker and initials.	
House Bill No. 2309	15th	August 16, 2010	Teddy Casiño	Bayan Muna	Senate Bill No. 1967	Naming of public properties and government services after incumbent elected public officials, their kin, spouses and relatives of up to fourth civil degree of consanguinity. Naming includes naming projects after one's moniker and initials.	
House Bill No. 4929	16th	September 3, 2014	Terry Ridon	Kabataan	—N/a	Name and identification of government officials on government projects and "other persons whose name or identity may in any manner be associated with said officials" except instances identified by the National Historical Commission of the Philippines	
House Bill No. 3952	17th	October 11, 2016	Robert Ace Barbers	Surigao del Norte; 2nd district	—N/a	Affixing or causing to be affixed the name, initials, logo or image of any public official to signage announcing a proposed, ongoing, or completed public works; And crediting an individual officer by placing his or her name or photo on any public service project or vehicle	
House Bill No. 71	18th	July 1, 2019	Robert Ace Barbers	Surigao del Norte; 2nd district	—N/a	Affixing or causing to be affixed the name, initials, logo or image of any public official to signage announcing a proposed, ongoing, or completed public works; And crediting an individual officer by placing his or her name or photo on any public service project or vehicle	
House Bill No. 1535	19th	July 7, 2022	Robert Ace Barbers	Surigao del Norte; 2nd district	—N/a	Affixing or causing to be affixed the name, initials, logo or image of any public official to signage announcing a proposed, ongoing, or completed public works; And crediting an individual officer by placing his or her name or photo on any public service project or vehicle	
House Bill No. 911	20th	July 1, 2025	Bernadette Barbers	Surigao del Norte; 2nd district	—N/a	Affixing or causing to be affixed the name, initials, logo or image of any public official to signage announcing a proposed, ongoing, or completed public works; And crediting an individual officer by placing his or her name or photo on any public service project or vehicle	

== Local governance policy ==
After the Manila mayoral victory of Isko Moreno in 2019, he stated that any tarpaulins of politicians or banners, as well as some government buildings named after local politicians who were still alive are to be removed, as he stated that its just only an "eyesore". He stated words like "Don't Immortalize Yourself" on national television about the issue. In Pasig, after the election of the same year, newly elected Pasig Mayor Vico Sotto stated that the residents should not post any tarpaulin with politician's face, especially with his face. He also stated that not being an epal is a way of educating citizens that every government projects are funded by the citizen's taxes.

== Non-governmental response ==
Various civic groups such as the Samahan ng mga Mamamayan Laban sa Trapo (SMLT), People's Support for Clean Elections, and Tama na Epal Movement has opposed epal practices and advocated for the passing of legislation related to this.

The Transparency and Accountability Network launched a campaign against epal in a lead up to the 2013 elections by setting up the "Anti-Epal" page in Facebook and encouraged users of the social platforms to share photos of instances of epal to encourage politicians to voluntarily cease from epal practices.

== See also ==
- Cult of personality
