= 1975 La Tondeña Distillery strike =

1975 Filipino protest action

- Date: October 24, 1975
- Duration: 44 hours
- Type: Strike
- Motive: Fight against the authoritarian regime of President Ferdinand Marcos
- Outcome: Marcos forces crack down on and defeat protesters

The logo of Ginebra San Miguel, successor of La Tondeña Inc.

The La Tondeña strike was a protest action that happened in October 1975, notable for being the first major strike in the Philippines to be held after President Ferdinand Marcos declared martial law in September 1972. It is also considered one of the first major open acts of resistance against the Marcos dictatorship, and an important turning point for the period.

== Strike ==
The strike began on October 24 when 500 workers, organizing themselves as the Kaisahan ng Malayang Manggagawa ng La Tondeña Inc. (Union of Free Workers of La Tondeña), stopped work and barricaded themselves in the facilities of La Tondeña, then the largest distillery in Asia. Their demands included the elevation of casual workers to permanent status, maternity leave for female workers, and an end to illegal firings.

The strike was originally possible under the rules of Martial Law because La Tondeña was not considered a critical industry, so Marcos eventually responded by proclaiming a decree that outlawed all strikes across all industries.

== Crackdown ==
The strike ended 44 hours later when Marcos' forces cracked down on the protesters, including various workers of the predominant Catholic Church who had decided to support the strikers.

== Media coverage ==
Journalism was heavily stifled under the Marcos dictatorship. Only news organizations owned or taken over by relatives or cronies of Ferdinand Marcos were allowed to reopen after the declaration of martial law. However, a few independent publications were later able to operate. Signs of the Times, a small mimeographed publication by the Association of Major Religious Superiors of the Philippines, ran stories on the La Tondeña strike in October 1975, the first big strike to defy martial law.

== Aftermath ==
As stories of the La Tondeña strike spread, the event became a symbol of resistance. Despite the arrest of the strikers, the strike was a considered a victory by La Tondeña workers, as well as the entire labor movement. La Tondeña agreed to immediately hire as regular employees more than 300 workers and promised to regularize 300 more. The workers issued a statement that said, "We achieved in our two-day strike what we were unable to obtain in almost five years of appeals and negotiations with the Department of Labor."

== Leaders and supporters ==
Labor rights activist Edgar Jopson played a key role in organizing the protest, and for among other things, coining the protest phrase "Sobra na! Tama na! Welga na!" (lit. "[It's] Too much now! Enough now! Strike now!"). The slogan would become a popular catchphrase used by the labor protest movement until the ouster of Marcos during the 1986 People Power revolution more than a decade later.

Another organizer of the strike was labor leader Eliseo "Elsie" Estares, who was later recognized by Kilusang Mayo Uno with a Gawad Lingkod Obrero for his heroism and contributions to the labor movement.

The strike received support from the religious sector, and was backed by such leaders as Father Joe Dizon, Sister Mary John Mananzan, and former priest Luis Jalandoni.

One of the first "outsiders" to learn about the plan for the strike was Sister Ason Martínez of the Missionary Sisters of the Immaculate Heart of Mary (ICM), who was ministering with the Rural Missionaries of the Philippines at the time, working in the urban poor communities of Tondo including La Tondeña. She joined the picket line to support the workers, and when Marcos' forces cracked down on the protesters, she confronted the soldiers and dared them to arrest her too despite protesters later managing to convince her it would be best for the cause she not insist on being jailed. She later cited the La Tondeña strike as a turning point which inspired her later contributions to civilian resistance against the Marcos regime.

== See also ==
- Timeline of the Marcos Dictatorship
- Workers' resistance against the Marcos dictatorship
- Religious sector resistance against the Marcos dictatorship
