= Daet massacre =

1981 killing of protesters in the Philippines

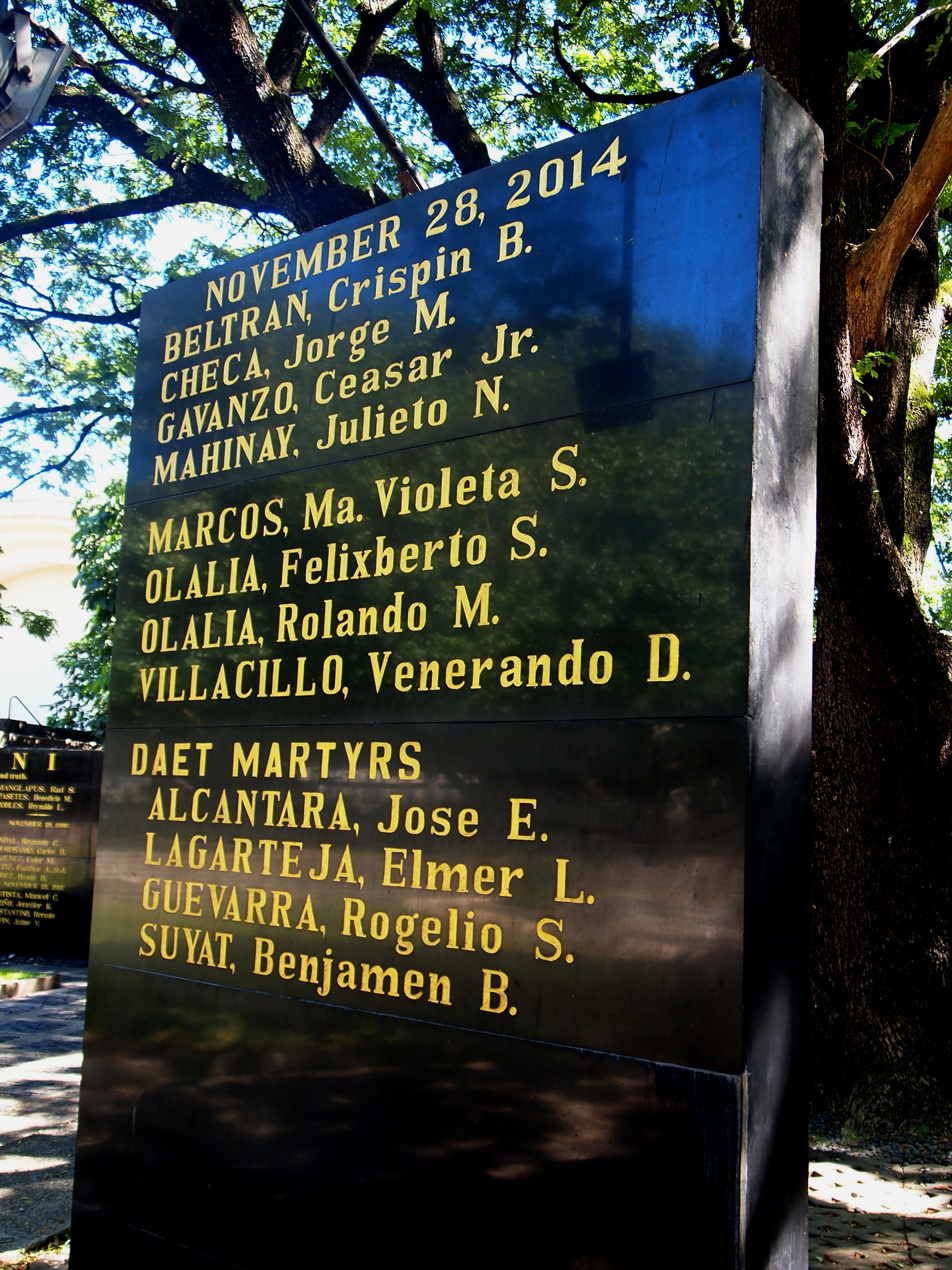
- Detail of the Wall of Remembrance at the Bantayog ng mga Bayani, showing names from the 2014 batch of Bantayog Honorees, including that of victims under the heading Daet martyrs.
- Location: Daet, Camarines Norte
- Date: Sunday, June 14, 1981 (UTC +8)
- Target: Demonstration
- Attack type: Shooting
- Deaths: at least 4
- Injuries: at least 50
- Perpetrator: Philippine Constabulary forces under Ferdinand Marcos

The Daet massacre, which took place on June 14, 1981, in Daet, Camarines Norte, resulted in four people dying on the spot, with at least 50 others injured when forces of Ferdinand Marcos' administration opened fire on protesters marching to demand an increase in copra prices, and to denounce "fake elections" and the Coco Levy Fund scam. The Daet massacre is particularly noted for happening shortly after Proclamation No. 2045 was issued in January 1981, supposedly lifting Martial Law on the Philippines.

Various reports from the period say that two of those who were seriously wounded died two months later, but these could not be corroborated by formal media outlets given the limitations on freedom of the press in the Philippines at the time.

== The incident ==
On June 14, 1981, demonstrators from Basud, Camarines Norte were preparing to join a rally to be staged at the Freedom Park in front of the Provincial Capitol of Daet. This was one of the many rallies organized and sponsored for the day by the Kilusang Mamamayan para sa Tunay na Demokrasya (KMTD). A few kilometers away from their destination, the group was forced to stop in Camambugan due to a fire truck parked on the way. The marchers then saw a military truck approaching. Some 30 troopers, later identified as those belonging to the 242nd Philippine Constabulary (PC) company, alighted the truck and commanded the marchers to kneel on the ground. The demonstrators, composed mostly of farmers and their relatives, pleaded to be allowed to proceed. The soldiers responded by firing upon the protesters. When the soldiers ceased shooting. At least four of the marchers were killed on the spot and some 50 others were wounded.

Grace Vinzons-Magana, coordinator for the KMTD, was able to persuade the soldiers to stop and to bring the survivors and the dead to the hospital. Shortly after, the PC issued a statement, asserting that members of the New People's Army (NPA) had convinced the protesters to rally and armed members of the group opened fire at the soldiers from the back of the crowd. The PC then allegedly fired warning shots into the air to calm the panicked protesters. This claim was belied by Atty. J. Antonio M. Carpio, the chairman of the KMTD, He and Vinzons-Magana, as corroborated by a fact-finding team led by Jose W. Diokno and Chino Roces, revealed that most of those who were killed or hit were at the frontlines, making it improbable that the shooters came from behind. The PC was also not able to confiscate firearms from the scene.

Before a proper investigation could be launched, Carpio and Vinzons-Magana were arrested in early July that same year. Initially detained without formal charges, the main basis of their arrest was revealed to be a presidential commitment order (PCO) issued by Ferdinand Marcos himself on June 26, supposedly on the grounds that their activities violated the Anti-Subversion Law (P.D. 885) and the production of propaganda pamphlets (P.D. 33). KMTD Vice Chair Luis General, Jr., leading the defense of Carpio and Vinzons-Magana, said he would question the authority of the office of Marcos to order the arrest, given that Martial Law had technically been lifted by January of 1981. With General, Jr.'s efforts and after widespread condemnation of their arrests, Carpio and Vinzons-Magana were released.

An investigation, conducted by the Ministry of Defense's Human Rights Committee, headed by Jose M. Crisol, exonerated the suspected perpetrators. Records would later show that, even though an informations for murder and attempted murder was filed and the accused were subpoenaed to submit controverting evidence, they never appeared. The warrant lapsed, and the case was ultimately archived on March 23, 1998, by the Regional Trial Court of Camarines Norte.

== Victims ==
Four of those killed have since been honored by having their names engraved on the Wall of Remembrance at the Bantayog ng mga Bayani memorial:

- Jose Esteban Alcantara,
- Rogelio Salayon Guevarra,
- Elmer Lis Lagarteja, and
- Benjamen Buena Suyat.

Unconfirmed reports have suggested that two other protesters—Rosita Arcega, aged 30, and Ernesto Encinas, aged 25—died from their wounds some weeks later, but documentation of events from that period is very scarce.

== In popular culture ==
In an oil painting by social realist painter Gene de Loyola, the Daet Massacre is compared to later violent dispersals of protesting farmers, most notably those at Hacienda Luisita on November 16, 2004.

== See also ==
- Elections in the Philippines
