= Mary John Mananzan =

Filipina nun and theologian (born 1937)

Mary John Mananzan O.S.B.
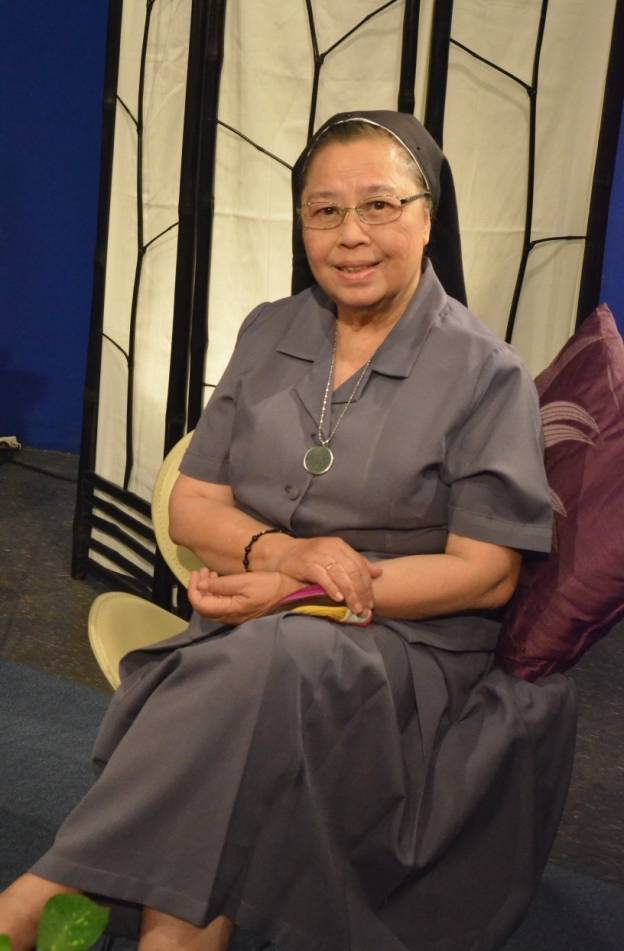

Personal life
- Born: November 6, 1937 (age 88) Dagupan, Pangasinan, Philippine Commonwealth
- Education: Pontifical Gregorian University (PhD); University of Münster (Diplom); St. Scholastica's College, Manila (AB-BSE)

Religious life
- Religion: Catholic Church
- Institute: Missionary Benedictines

Mary John Mananzan O.S.B. (born November 6, 1937) is a Missionary Benedictine nun, activist, educator, theologian and author. She helped develop an Asian feminist theology of liberation. She ministered as superior of the Manila community and member of the Priory Council.

Mananzan is currently Superior and Directress of St. Scholastica's Academy in San Fernando, Pampanga.

On March 8, 2011, she was cited as one of the 100 Most Inspiring Persons in the World, at the centennial of International Women's Day.

== Background ==
Mananzan is co-convenor of the Movement Against Tyranny.

She has served as president of Saint Scholastica's College for six years and dean for 18 years, prioress of the Missionary Benedictine Sisters in the Manila Priory, and national chairperson of the Association of Major Religious Superiors of the Philippines.

Mananzan also co-founded GABRIELA, federation of women's organizations and served as its national chairperson for 18 years.

== Education ==
Mananzan has a PhD in Philosophy major in Linguistic Philosophy at the Pontifical Gregorian University in Rome, Italy. She also has a Diplom degree in Missiology at the University of Münster in Germany.

She studied at St. Scholastica's College, Manila from high school through college, graduating with an AB-BSE degree, major in history.

== Stances ==
Mananzan is known for being feminist. She was one of the Catholics who supported the RH Bill, which guarantees access to contraception, fertility control, sexual education, and maternal care. The bill was signed by President Benigno Aquino III.

She was also known for her support for SOGIE Equality Bill, known as Equality Bill or Anti-Discrimination Bill (ADB).

Both bills were opposed by the Catholic Bishops' Conference of the Philippines.

== Awards and recognition ==
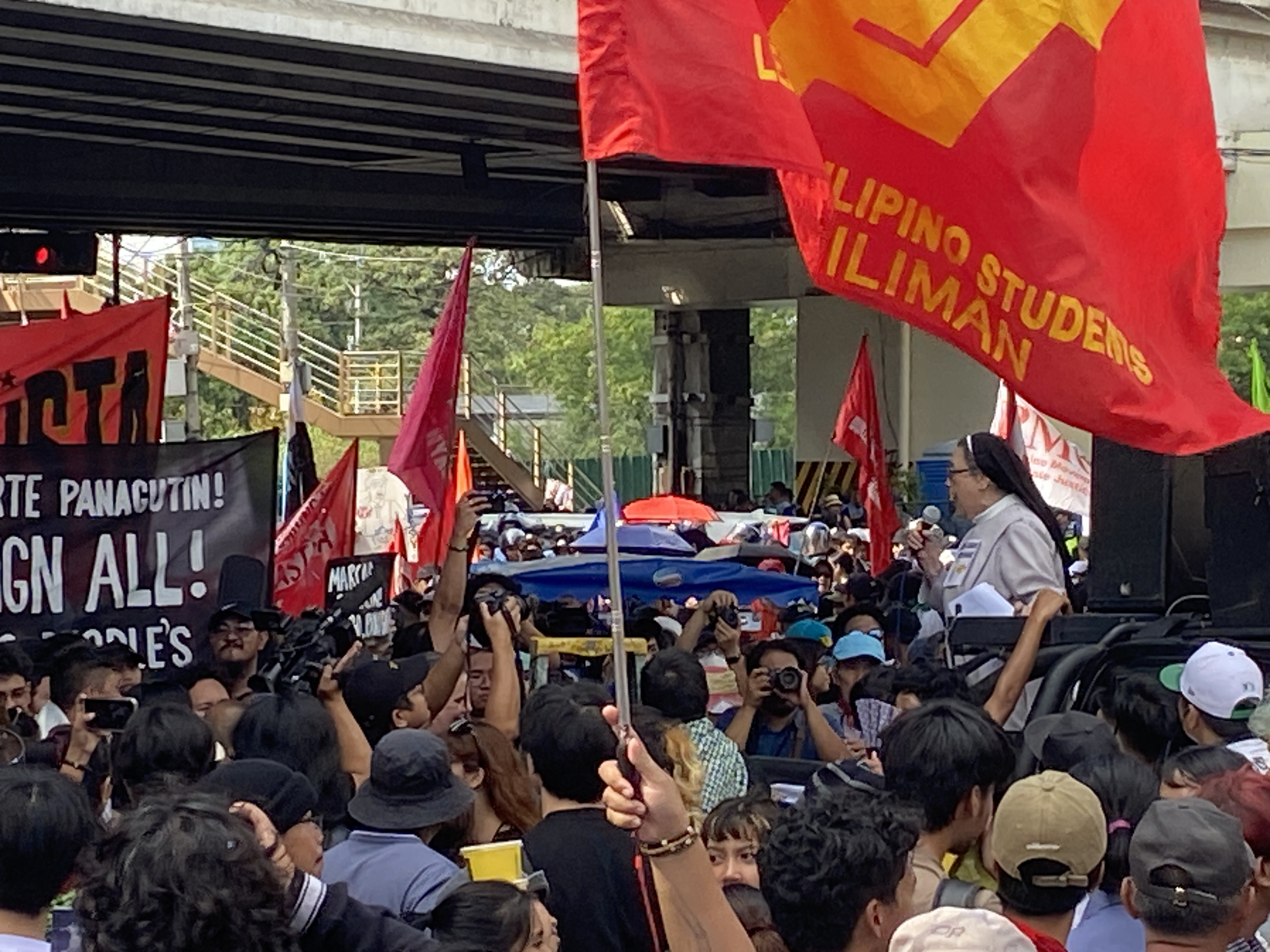
Speaking at the Baha Sa EDSA mobilization, part of the EDSA People Power 40th anniversary commemoration and Philippine anti-corruption protests.

Mananzan has been recognized as follows:

- Benigno Aquino Jr. Award for Nationalism, Federation of Catholic Schools' Alumnae Association (2011)
- 100 inspiring persons in the world, Women Deliver (2011, citation given on the occasion of the 100 years of the International Women's day celebration)
- Outstanding Woman Leader in Manila, Office of the Mayor of Manila (2009)
- Asian Public Intellectual fellowship, Nippon Foundation (2002)
- Henry Luce Fellowship at the Union Theological Seminary in New York (1995)
- Dorothy Cadbury Fellowship in Birmingham (1994)

The Pontifical Mission Society awarded her the first ever Pauline Jaricot Award in Germany in October 2022, for exemplifying the qualities of St. Pauline Jaricot: ‘living joyfully the vocation that God gave her, teaching a spirit of prayer and loving sacrifice, and bringing mission into every moment.’

== See also ==
- Religious sector resistance against the Marcos dictatorship
- La Tondeña strike
- Movement Against Tyranny
