= Luis General Jr. =

Filipino soldier, lawyer and journalist

- Born: August 15, 1921
- Died: October 18, 1997 (aged 76)
- Spouse: Maria Molina (m. 1954)

Luis General Jr. (August 15, 1921 – October 18, 1997), sometimes also known by his nickname "Luising" was a Filipino writer, journalist, lawyer, educator, World War II soldier, and activist best known for his work as a human rights lawyer and as a mentor to other lawyers in his home region of Bicol, as an oppositionist delegate to the Philippine Constitutional Convention of 1971, and for his extensive involvement in resistance against the authoritarian rule of Ferdinand Marcos.

== Early life ==
Luis General, Jr. was born on August 15, 1921.

== Career ==
=== World War II ===
When World War II broke out, General Jr. was a trainee in the Reserve Officers` Training Corps (ROTC) of the University of Santo Tomas, and he was activated to serve in the US Armed Forces in the Far East (USAFFE). After the fall of Bataan and Corregidor, General Jr. was able to make his way back to Naga, but he quickly became involved in guerilla activities through the Allied Intelligence Bureau – an experimental unit created by the USAFFE intelligence staff (G-2) for the purpose of supporting the creation and operations of guerilla resistance units.

It was during the war that he met Maria Molina, whom he eventually married in 1954.

=== Postwar work and advocacies ===
After the war, General Jr. took on a number of roles – as an educator, as a journalist, as a lawyer, and a public intellectual.

Taking on a post as professor at the University of Nueva Caceres, he taught history, Political Science, and the Rizal Course to undergrads, and taught Constitutional Law, Public International Law, Legal Ethics. to law students. This position allowed General Jr. to have a significant influence on the next generation of Bicolano lawyers – a fact widely acknowledged in testimonials of later leaders, such as Soliman Santos Jr. and Jesse Robredo.

General Jr also started a career as a professional journalist, when he was tasked with writing a column for the Naga Times. Remarking on General Jr.'s writing from this period, writer Bienvenido Santos is noted for having called him "the best essay writer in the land." He eventually became the Naga Times' Editor, helping it earn accolades, such as being declared the Philippine Federation of National Press Clubs' 1971 "Most Outstanding Provincial Newspaper." During this time, he often wrote in tandem with fellow columnist and radio commentator Jesus Antonio Carpio.

As the turbulent years of the Second Marcos administration rolled in, General Jr. even ran in the elections for delegates to the Philippine Constitutional Convention of 1971 (colloquially called the "ConCon"), but lost due to the lack of campaign machinery and funding. Instead, he famously wrote a series on columns on necessary reforms for the Constitution.

=== Martial Law ===
Nearing the end of his last allowable Presidential term under the 1935 constitution, Ferdinand Marcos extended his presidency by proclaiming martial law in 1972. Luis General Jr. and Jesus Antonio Carpio, and many Filipino intellectuals, academics, and statesmen were among those immediately arrested. All but a handful of pro-Marcos publications were ordered shut down, so the Naga Times was shuttered.

Many of the oppositionist delegates whom General Jr. had hoped to join were arrested, and a select group of pro-Marcos delegates were selected to write a new draft of the Constitution, which then became the subject of the controversial 1973 Philippine constitutional plebiscite and questioned by the Ratification Cases filed against the Supreme Court.

General Jr. himself was released after one month, thanks to the intervention of Archbishop Teopisto Alberto of Caceres; once he was out, General Jr. went back to being an outspoken critic of the Marcos dictatorship.

He joined the Free Legal Assistance Group, a prominent group of human rights lawyers which was providing legal aid to Marcos' political detainees, in 1975. In 1976 he also became editorial writer for a new newspaper named Balalong. Returning to the teaching of law, he would taught his students how the new Marcos constitution was "contrary to political law."

1983 saw a period of severe instability in the Philippines, beginning with a massive economic nosedive in March which exacerbated the negative effects of Marcos' debt-driven strategy for infrastructure projects. In the ensuing social unrest, opposition leader Ninoy Aquino tried to return to the Philippines in August in an effort to reason with Marcos. But Aquino was assassinated on the airport tarmac just as he was getting out of the plane.

Defying government censors, this period of unrest gave birth to numerous new newspapers being established throughout the country. Luis General Jr. joined one of these papers, Handiong, while continuing to write for Balalong.

=== After martial law ===
After Marcos was ousted by the 1986 People Power Revolution, General Jr. supported calls for reparations to the many victims of the human rights abuses of the Marcos dictatorship.

== Published works ==
Aside from his work as a journalist, Luis General, Jr. was the author of two books Readings on Bicol Culture and Serenade to a Stoic & Other Poems.

Another particularly well-known work of General Jr. was an English translation of Mi último adiós, the poem Philippine hero José Rizal wrote just before being executed. Entitled Our Plundered Paradise, the translation was first published by the Philippine Daily Inquirer in 1985.

== Death ==
Luis General, Jr. died on 18 October 1997.

In 2023, General Jr. was one of six people who were honored by having their names added to the inscriptions on the Wall of Remembrance at the Philippines' Bantayog ng mga Bayani, which honors the martyrs and heroes that fought the authoritarian regime of Ferdinand Marcos. The others honored during General Jr.'s batch included Ata Manobo triber leader Manuel "Buyog" Sampiano, and General Jr.'s close friend Jesus Antonio Carpio. The formal citations for the heroism of Carpio and General Jr. were read by former Philippine vice president Leni Robredo during the conferment ceremony.
