= Workers' resistance against the Marcos dictatorship =

Opposition in the Philippines, 1970s and 1980s

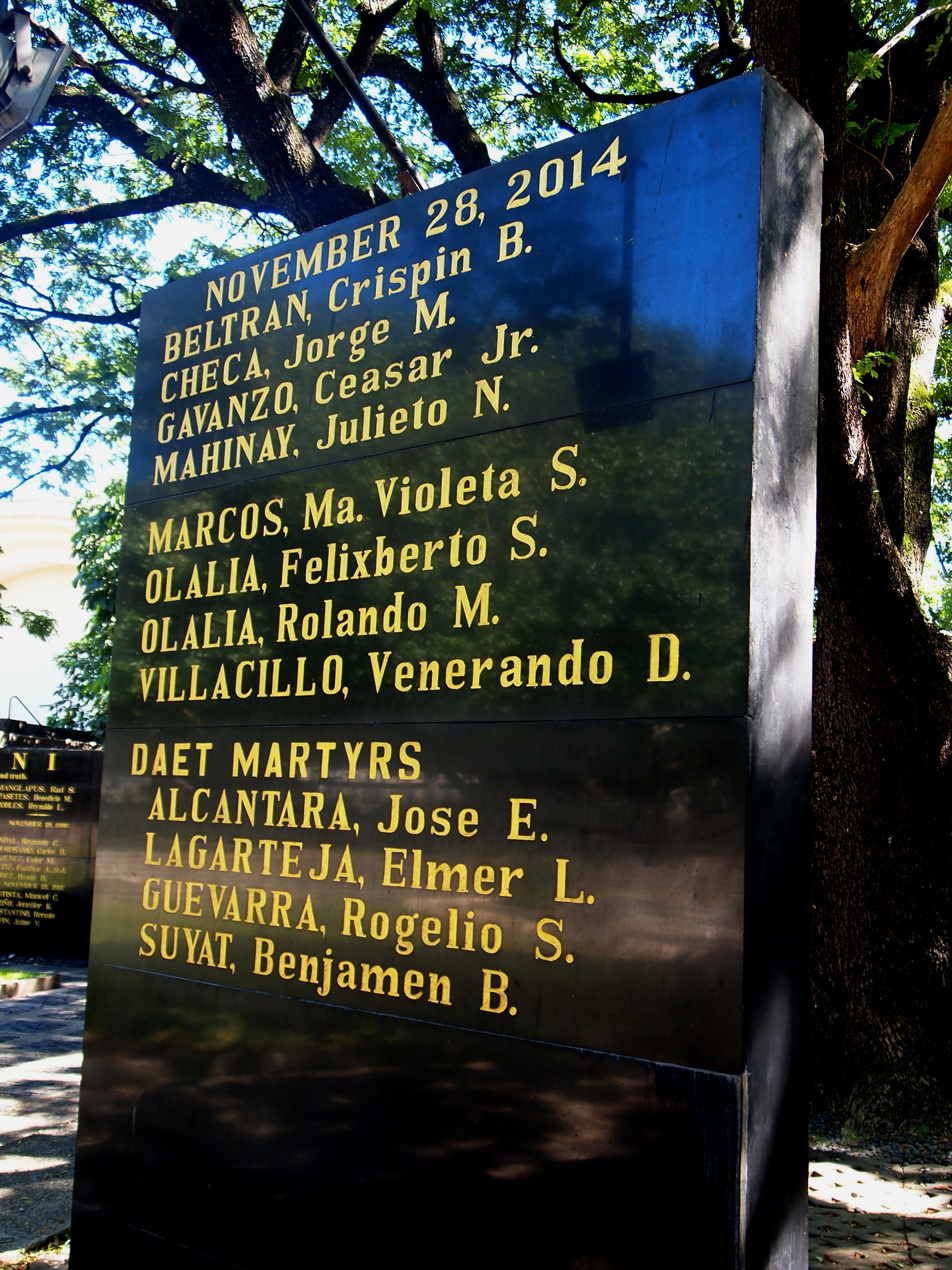
Detail of the Wall of Remembrance at the Bantayog ng mga Bayani, showing names from the 2014 batch of Bantayog Honorees, including three labor leaders who became the first three chairmen of the trade union center Kilusang Mayo Uno (KMU): Felixberto Olalia Sr., Rolando Olalia, and Crispin Beltran.

During the presidency of Ferdinand Marcos, Filipino workers in the labor industry experienced the effects of government corruption, crony capitalism, and cheap labor for foreign transnational industries, One of the objectives of Martial Law was to cheapen labor costs, in order to attract transnational corporations to export labor to the Philippines. Marcos signed many presidential decrees beneficial only to his associates, while allowing for the forced relocation of indigenous peoples, decreasing workers' wages, and murders of labor activists. Minimum wage was a fixed PHP8.00 per day. Many workers were unemployed or underemployed. It was also during the Marcos presidency when the practice of contractualization began, enabling managements to avoid giving regular, permanent status to employees after six months of work. Strikes were banned and the government controlled trade unions, leaving workers without effective protection against employers who had unfair labor practices and regulations.

Furthermore, with each year under Martial Law, economic conditions deteriorated due to a large trade deficit. Between 1974 and 1981, the trade deficit increased from $418 million to $2.2 billion, while the foreign debt increased from $5.1 million to $14.8 billion in 1976 and 1981. A study by the World Bank found that Philippine poverty increased between 1972 and 1978. Real wages for skilled for workers in urban areas fell by 23.8%, and for unskilled laborers the decline was 31.6%. Authors of the study concluded that "purchasing power has dropped in both urban and rural areas, in all regions, and practically all occupations," and the gap between rich and poor is "worse in the Philippines than elsewhere in the [Southeast Asian] region. In this context, the material conditions of the working class was greatly in contrast to the lavish opulence of crony capitalism under of the Marcos regime. These are some of the factors that propelled workers to resist the Marcos dictatorship.

These workers protested against the Marcos regime in forms of silent strikes, sit-down strikes, work slowdowns, mass leaves and the stretching of the break period.

The first major strike against the dictatorship was in La Tondeña, then the largest distillery in Asia. The workers protested and continued to do so despite the ban. In the following months, around 200 strikes broke out nationwide, with 80,000 participating. In Manila alone, there were 25 strikes, with 40,000 participating. In 1981, after Marcos nominally lifted Martial Law, 260 strikes took place, with over 76,000 workers involved. Labor unions against the dictatorship increased in number and strength under martial law.

== The La Tondeña strike ==
In the La Tondeña strike, over 500 workers went on strike, led by student activist Edgar Jopson and veteran labor activists, church people, labor unions, and the surrounding community. On the second day of the protest, the police cracked down on the area and arrested the workers. Word of the protest spread, becoming one of the symbols of resistance. Marcos responded by proclaiming a decree that outlawed all strikes across all industries. Nevertheless, the strike was a political turning point. The La Tondeña workers' slogan, "Tama Na, Sobra, Welga Na," was later adapted by protestors in the final years of the Marcos dictatorship.

== Martyrs and heroes honored at the Bantayog ng mga Bayani ==
- Danilo M. Aguirre (September 17, 1955 – June 21, 1982) – During Martial Law, Aguirre joined a parish-based group focused on making people aware of their rights. He joined protest actions and political campaigns. He also helped in organizing farmers in Central Luzon. As their group held a meeting in Bulacan, government troops surrounded them. Aguirre's body, along with four other comrades (Borlongan, Llorente, Manimbo and Medina) were later found dead. Collectively, they are known as the Bulacan Martyrs.
- Jose E. Alcantara (June 27, 1941 – June 14, 1981) – He was a farmer in Daet, Camarines Norte, where he and his family were constantly threatened by the presence of soldiers. He joined a protest in June 1981, which was met by military force. Soldiers fired bullets in the crowd, killing Alcantara and at least three others. The event came to be known as the Daet Massacre.
- Chuck Anastacio (May 11, 1955-December 18, 1982; born Marciano P. Anastacio Jr.) - Chuck Anastacio was an urban poor community and labor organizer who played key roles in the 1975 La Tondeña Distillery strike and in the unionization of workers of Gelmart Industries Philippines. When a military agent shot him in the face and left him for dead in 1980, he was compelled to join the underground resistance against the Marcos regime in light of the likelihood of further attacks on him and his loved ones. Nonetheless, he died in an ambush by military forces in December 1982.
- Elsa Balando (January 1, 1949 - May 1, 1971) - Balando was a factory worker and union organizer at Rossini’s Knitwear Factory in Caloocan City. She was part of the 4000 crowd which formed in front of the Congress building in Manila (which has since been repurposed as the National Museum of the Philippines) in commemoration of International Labor Day on May 1, 1971. Armed troops from the 55th Philippine Constabulary Company and the Philippine Constabulary Metropolitan Command (Metrocom) were assigned to the event. The crowd heard explosions and gunshots, and eventually three rallyists were killed - Balando, and two others named Richard Escarta and Ferdinand Oaing; fifteen other rallyists were wounded. The event came to be known as the May Day Massacre of 1971.
- Crispin B. Beltran (January 7, 1933 – May 20, 2008) – 'Ka Bel' had been a major labor leader since the 1950s and was a founding member of the Kilusang Mayo Uno, an "independent and democratic labor center promoting genuine, militant and anti-imperialist trade unionism." He was elected to the Philippine Congress in 1981 to represent the poor and marginalized sectors in society.
- Edwin G. Borlongan (May 14, 1959 – June 21, 1982) – Borlongan worked in Tondo, Manila as a driver/mechanic when he participated in the grassroots movement against the Marcos dictatorship. In 1981, he returned to his home in Bulacan and volunteered in helping organize farmers. He was meeting with other four activists (Aguirre, Llorente, Manimbo and Medina) when they were arrested by the military. He and his fellow organizers, now known as the Bulacan Martyrs, were later found dead.
- Amado Guinto Bugay (February 6, 1954 – April 9, 1977) – Bugay experienced extreme poverty without enough land and resources. He joined the activist organization, Samahang Demokratikong Kabataan, to motivate other young people to stand up for their rights against landlords, corrupt politicians and exploitative factory owners. He later joined a guerrilla unit in Bataan and was killed during an encounter with government troops.
- Claro Gringco Cabrera (December 14, 1956 – May 31, 1984) – Cabrera was a construction worker turned political activist who organized urban poor communities in Angeles City, Pampanga. He was active in the protests after the assassination of Sen. Ninoy Aquino, becoming part of the Concerned Citizens of Pampanga and joining nationwide Lakbayan and Sakbayan marches. He was picked up and taken to a Philippine Constabulary camp along with Deheran and Castro, where they were beaten and forced into admitting they were part of the New People's Army to no avail. He was later found dead bearing stab wounds.
- Rolando Castro (April 1, 1954 – May 31, 1984) – Castro was a tricycle driver and community organizer of the Concerned Citizens of Pampanga. He was active in many protest movements, including the boycott of the 1984 Batasang Pambansa elections. Shortly after, he was picked up by the Philippine Constabulary with Claro Cabrera and Pepito Deheran. Authorities beat him and tried to force an admission that he was part of the NPA. He was later found dead near the Apalit river in Pampanga.
- Ronellio "Noel" Clarete (September 26, 1963 – March 1984) – Clarete was a senior commerce student in Batangas and a leading member of the Justice for Aquino Justice for All (JAJA) movement. With three other men (Evangelio, Magpantay and Umali, collectively known as the Lakbayan martyrs or Lakbayanis), he disappeared during a Lakbayan (Lakad para sa Kalayaan ng Bayan) march in March 1984. His mutilated body was later found in Silang, Cavite.
- Adrian Cortez (June 22, 1954 - ca. August 4, 1983; born Hernando Mondoy Cortez) – A student leader and activist at the Gregorio Araneta University Foundation (GAUF) where he had majored in agriculture, Hernando Mondoy Cortez decided to quit his studies and move back home to Mindanao, where he changed his name to Adrian and worked for the Institute for Workers’ Education and Leadership Training, of the United Methodist Student Center in Davao City. He went around Davao City, Davao del Norte and del Sur, North Cotabato, and South Cotabato doing lectures on trade union work for banana plantation workers, stevedores, and commercial establishment workers. He eventually became known for being one of the pillars of the labor movement in Mindanao, helping organize the Center of Trade Unions in Mindanao (CENTRUM) and the Nagkahiusang Mamumuo sa Mindanao (United Workers in Mindanao/ NAMAMIN, which was the Mindanao chapter of the Kilusang Mayo Uno. He disappeared in General Santos City in early August 1983, and his family members finally found his body, bearing the signs of torture, in a funeral parlor later that month. Realizing that the military authorities were giving conflicting dates for Adrian's death, his father had the death certificate marked August 4, 1983, believing that Adrian had been caught by Marcos' soldiers and then tortured and killed on that date.
- Pepito Lumanta Deheran (January 6, 1957 – June 2, 1984) – Deheran was a member of the Concerned Citizens of Pampanga who campaigned for the boycott of the 1984 Batasang Pambansa elections. Along with Cabrera and Castro, he was tortured and interrogated by government troops. While the two died immediately afterwards, Deheran survived and was able to give a sworn statement to identify his attackers. While he was in the hospital, however, he was stabbed to death.
- Silme Garciano Domingo – Domingo was born in America from Filipino migrant parents. He helped organize a union among cannery workers in Alaska, promoting the rights of people of color. He established the Katipunan ng Demokratikong Pilipinas, and was active in a US-based coalition against the Marcos regime. He was killed by a gunman paid by a friend of the dictator. After his death, a United States court ordered the Marcoses to pay $15 million in damages to his family.
- Ruth Dueñas (December 2, 1959 - January 23, 1983) - Ruth Dueñas was a Davao City based labor organizer with the Concerned Citizens for Justice and Peace (CCJP), a human rights organization which Catholic nuns had helped organize. She helped labor unions in organizing strikes and protests, and brought food and basic necessities to workers on strike. And she joined in campaigns calling for the end of the authoritarian regime of Ferdinand Marcos. Ruth was in a meeting with Davao labor leaders in Barangay San Isidro Bunawan in Davao City when their meeting venue was surrounded the Philippine Constabulary. Two members of their group were summarily executed on the spot, while Ruth and several others were taken away, only for their bodies to turn up later bearing gunshot wounds and signs of abuse the day after.
- Macli-ing Dulag (? 1932 – April 24, 1980) – He was a leader of the Bugnay Kalinga tribe who led the indigenous people's campaign to stop the construction of a dam across the Chico River. The project would have wiped out 1,400 km^{2} of their tribal territories, including their homes and rice terraces. Dulag was murdered by government soldiers, which intensified the efforts to oppose the project, which ultimately never pushed through.
- Pedro Dungoc, Sr. (? 1943 – June 22, 1985) – Along with Macli-ing Dulag, he led the opposition against the Chico River Dam project. He helped set up a functional literacy program in the localities, and reached out to other sectors to voice out concerns about the project. In April 1980, soldiers arrived in Bugnay seeking both Dulag and Dungoc. They opened fire on their targets' houses, and Dulag was killed instantly, but Dungoc survived and continued the opposition.
- Ronilo Tumbaga Evangelio (March 28, 1960 – March 1984) – Evangelio worked at the Batangas City Engineering Office when he joined the Justice for Aquino Justice for All (JAJA) movement and became one of its organizers. Along with three other men (Clarete, Magpantay and Umali, collectively known as the Lakbayan martyrs or Lakbayanis), he disappeared during a Lakbayan march in March 1984. His body was later found in Silang, Cavite, bearing torture marks.
- Ceferino A. Flores, Jr (February 4, 1939 – ?) – He worked in the hotel industry and helped found the National Union of Workers in the Hotel, Restaurant and Allied Industries. He also secretly helped members of the anti-dictatorship underground to scout for safe places to meet. One night he disappeared after his shift from work and was never found again.
- Rogelio S. Guevarra (December 1, 1936 – June 14, 1981) – Guevarra was informed of the rally and chose to participate, leaving his pregnant daughter in the care of his son-in-law. He was one of the marchers at the frontlines during a rally in Camarines Norte when they were halted by military troopers, who proceeded to shoot at them. Guevarra was among those shot.
- Alfredo Aillaflor Jasul (May 23, 1952 – January 13, 1973) – Jasul was a student at the Far Eastern University when he became a member of the student activist group Kabataang Makabayan. He worked with tenant farmers in Tarlac and Lucban, Quezon. After Martial Law was imposed, such activities were considered subversive. Jasul was killed inside a house in Quezon by government troops.
- Elmer L. Lagarteja (August 10, 1960 – June 14, 1981) – Lagarteja received news of a planned rally in Camarines Norte and wanted to join, as his brother and father would be joining. En route to Daet, the demonstrators were violently dispersed by Constabulary troopers using firearms. Lagarteja was among those shot and killed in what came to be known as the Daet Massacre.
- Erasto "Nonoy" L. Librado (January 30, 1947 - September 24, 1992) – A Certified Public Accountant who started out as the head of the Employee's Union at the Bank of the Philippine Islands, Librado led the Mindanao delegation when the Kilusang Mayo Uno (KMU) was formed in 1980. He also helped form numerous other unions and worker's organizations including the National Federation of Labor (NFL), the United Lumber and General Workers of the Philippines (ULGWP), the Southern Philippines Federation of Labor (SPFL), the Nagkahiusang Mamumuo sa Habagatang Mindanao (United Workers of Southern Mindanao, NAMAHMIN), the Center for Trade Union in Mindanao (CENTRUM) and later helped organize the Mindanao delegations of the Justice for Aquino Justice for All (JAJA) campaign and the Coalition of Organization for Restoration of Democracy (CORD). Arrested, tortured and held in solitary confinement by the Marcos dictatorship in 1984, he eventually became secretary general of KMU-Mindanao during the presidency of Corazon Aquino from 1986 to 1992. He won as a City councillor for the first district of Davao City during the 1992 elections, but died of a stroke after serving only 54 days.
- Teresita E. Llorente (February 8, 1962 – June 21, 1982) – Llorente was the youngest and only woman among the Bulacan Martyrs. She was active in her church as a catechist and member of the church choir. She volunteered to help set up a farmers' organization in her province. During one of their meetings, they were surrounded by military troopers and loaded in vehicles. Her lifeless body, along with four other peasant organizers (Aguirre, Borlongan, Manimbo, and Medina), was later found sprawled in front of the municipal hall.
- Aurelio "Boy" Magpantay (November 12, 1952 – March 1984) – Magpantay was a student of Western Philippine Colleges in Batangas and a member of the Justice for Aquino Justice for All (JAJA) movement and the August Twenty-One Movement. During the Lakbayan march in March 1984, along with three other men (Clarete, Evangelio and Umali, collectively known as the Lakbayan martyrs or Lakbayanis), Magpantay disappeared and was later found dumped in a shallow grave in Cavite, bearing stab wounds.
- Renato T. Manimbo (September 12, 1957 – June 21, 1982) – Manimbo was a founding member of the League of Filipino Students, a "national democratic mass organization committed to advance the national democratic aspirations of the people." He was a student at the Far East Air Transport Incorporated University (FEATI) in Manila where he headed the student council. The school withheld his diploma because of his anti-dictatorship activities. Despite this, he continued to work in youth organizations and among peasants in his home province. He, along with the other four Bulacan Martyrs (Aguirre, Borlongan, Llorente and Medina), was arrested while they were meeting in Pulilan in June 1982, and killed while in military custody.
- Constantino R. Medina (May 3, 1954 – June 21, 1982) – Medina participated in political activities organized to counter the dictatorship. He was among the organizers of the Bulacan chapter of Alyansa ng Magbubukid sa Gitnang Luzon (AMGL). While he was having a meeting with other volunteers (Aguirre, Borlonga, Llorente and Manimbo) in Pulilan, they were arrested by government forces. The next day, their bodies were found in front of the San Rafael Municipal Hall.
- Felixberto Olalia, Sr. - (August 3, 1903 – December 4, 1983) – Olalia, known by his friends as "Ka Bert," was a veteran union leader by the time Marcos was first elected president in 1965. He helped establish Masaka, a militant peasant organization that Marcos later proclaimed in a speech as a "number one threat." Marcos tried to co-opt Olalia by sending him as an emissary to then-Communist China to establish diplomatic links. Olalia was in China when Marcos declared Martial Law, but the labor leader promptly returned. He was arrested as he arrived at the airport. Upon release, he continued his activities in the labor movement, particularly under National Federation of Labor Unions (NAFLU), a militant labor federation established by Olalia. NAFLU under Olalia went on to organize the biggest number of strikes launched in the 1970s. Olalia also helped establish human rights organizations to document human rights violations under the Marcos dictatorship. He helped establish the National Coalition for the Protection of Workers’ Rights (NCPWR) and the Center for Trade Union and Human Rights (CTUHR). These coalitions were composed of watchdogs from the labor, professionals and the religious sectors. Olalia became the first chairperson of the Kilusang Mayo Uno (KMU). Its founding congress was attended by allied professionals, religious and anti-Marcos politicians as well as local and foreign media.
- Rolando Olalia (September 3, 1934 – November 13, 1986) – Olalia, also known as "Ka Lando", was a lawyer and son to labor leader Felixberto Olalia, Sr. He was active in the labor movement and was detained twice during martial law. He was the elected chairman of the National Federation of Labor Unions in 1983, and the chair of Kilusang Mayo Uno in 1984, and the Pambansang Koalisyon ng mga Manggagawa Laban sa Kahirapan. In November 1986, he voiced his support for the Aquino administration by vowing to go on a nationwide strike if the military attempted a coup against the government. A day after his announcement, he and his driver, unionist Leonor Alay-ay, were abducted after leaving to attend a union meeting, and were found dead the next day bearing torture marks. Three members of the Reform the Armed Forces Movement (RAM), Fernando Casanova, Dennis Jabatan and Desiderio Perez, were later found guilty of two counts of murder in 2021 by the Antipolo Regional Trial Court for the deaths of Olalia and Alay-ay.
- Florencio Salvador Pesquesa (September 21, 1931 – ?) – Pesquesa was a farm worker who used to work in the Philippine Constabulary. He led a labor union in the Hacienda Inchian in Laguna, often speaking to labor group about the rights of farm workers. Because of his actions, he became in conflict with the management of the estate. He was abducted on January 3, 1979, and was never seen again.
- Rodrigo Ponce – Ponce was a farmer who worked for the National Movement for Free Elections (NAMFREL) in Capiz, and he was assigned to monitor proceedings during the 1986 snap elections. Four persons came in the room and seized ballot boxes. Because he recognized one of the men, he was brought outside and shot dead.
- Victor Dandan Reyes (December 18, 1951 – disappeared May 11, 1977) – Reyes was a student activist from FEATI and was involved in labor movements before Marcos declared Martial Law. He engaged in political discussions and helped put up unions. He was also closely associated with Hermon Lagman, a labor lawyer. Both one day failed to show up at a meeting, and they are missing until today.
- Sofronio Pongos Roxas (April 12, 1938 – August 29, 1984) – Roxas was a farmer and lay leader in the Catholic diocese in Kidapawan, North Cotabato. He was branded as a subversive by martial-law authorities, and was arrested twice without being charged in court. He attended mass actions and publicly criticized corrupt officials. He was on his way home on horseback from a mill when he was shot and killed. The weapon used was reportedly an M16 rifle.
- Roger Canda Salas (d. 12 December 1972) - Roger Salas was a Filipino labor activist and doctor's assistant best known for leading Filipino workers in fighting discriminatory policies in Clark Air Base in the early 1970s, and for his murder by Marcos forces while he was participating in a medical outreach project in Pampanga on December 12, 1972. His brother Rodolfo Salas was a leader in the armed resistance, but Roger himself chose to focus on non-underground activities such as bringing medical aid to far-flung communities. Despite this, he was captured, tortured, and then killed by Marcos' soldiers shortly after the declaration of Martial Law. His work in resisting the dictatorship was recognized at the Philippines' Bantayog ng mga Bayani memorial in November 2025.
- Benjamen B. Suyat (1933 – June 14, 1981) – Suyat was a tenant farmer who was on his way to a protest in Daet, Camarines Norte when he, along with other farmers and neighbors, were stopped by soldiers and forbidden to go forward. When they decided to continue towards the protest, they were shot at close range. Suyat was among those killed.
- Ananteflor Argonza Torres (September 23, 1941 – February 4, 1986) – Torres was a former employee at the Bureau of Customs and later for an export and logging firm. She helped establish the Cagayan Valley Human Rights Organization, which focused on organizing dialogues, marches and protests to raise awareness about military abuses in the province. They were ambushed and killed by unidentified men.
- Enrique "Eric" D. Torres (September 21, 1947 - April 4, 2004) - Torres was a teacher who authored the Manual of Legal Rights for Teachers and Education Workers (1984) and helped establish the teachers’ organizations Alliance of Concerned Teachers (ACT) and the Teacher Center of the Philippines (TCP) during the Marcos dictatorship. He was executive director of the TCP from 1982 to 1986, and chair of the ACT from 1989 to 2001. It was under his leadership that the ACT, working with the Alliance of Rizal and Metro Manila Public Elementary and Secondary School Teachers (ARMMPESST), staged a nationwide teacher's strike in 1989 which was joined by about n30,000 teachers in Metro Manila and Central Luzon. The action succeeded in getting teachers higher wages of $32 a month as well as improved benefits for teachers.
- Ismael "Mael" Umali (October 16, 1961 – March 1984) – Umali was a student leader and member of the League of Filipino Students. He was also part of the Justice for Aquino Justice for All (JAJA) movement, the Youth Citizens of Student Committee, and the Student Forum in Batangas City. After joining the Lakbayan march in March 1984, Umali, along with three other men (Clarete, Evangelio, and Magpantay, collectively known as the Lakbayan martyrs or Lakbayanis) disappeared and was later found battered and dumped in Cavite.

== See also ==
- Bulacan Martyrs
- Religious sector resistance against the Marcos dictatorship
- Indigenous people's resistance against the Marcos dictatorship
