= Carol Araullo =

Filipino activist

Maria Carolina "Carol" Castillo Pagaduan Araullo (born December 15, 1953) is a Filipino activist and was formerly the Chairperson of Bagong Alyansang Makabayan (New Patriotic Alliance).

== College education and early activism ==
Araullo went into University of the Philippines Diliman as a psychology major. Active in extra-curriculars, she was elected councilor in the College of Arts and Sciences, and later as vice-chairperson of the University Student Council. She also joined the UP Student Catholic Action. During the Diliman Commune, she was reviewing for exams when she was called by a fellow student who made her realize others were outside protesting, while she was still studying. She joined the said mass action but was initially critical of the violence coming from both the police and the protesters. Witnesseing the 1971 shooting of student activist Pastor “Sonny” Mesina, Jr., radicalised her, and she changed her stance saying "the State, the government, that has a monopoly on sanctioned violence."

She became a known youth leader during the resistance to the martial law proclaimed by dictator President Ferdinand Marcos, Sr. She graduated from University of the Philippines College of Medicine. She then delivered the valedictory address at the 1975 commencement exercises after she was detained for two years. She also went and organized the underground resistance.

== Post martial-law ==
After martial law, she realized that even though the president changed, the system did not. While not practicing medicine formally, she was able to organize health practitioners among rural communities.

Araullo has been the Chairperson of Bagong Alyansang Makabayan since 2008. She has continuously spoken regarding various issues in the Philippines beyond regarding human rights, economics, and sovereignty.

In October 2022, Araullo and her son Atom were red-tagged by social media trolls, including former NTF-ELCAC spokesperson Lorraine Badoy and Jeffrey Celiz, claiming that she is a member of the New People's Army and responsible for the Mendiola Massacre. Her son, Atom, called out the red-tagging incident and filed a suit against Badoy and Celiz for civil damages, which ruled in favor of the Araullos.

She writes an editorial in BusinessWorld, titled "Streetwise."

== Personal life ==
Her husband is Miguel Araullo, an engineer. She is the mother of journalist and TV personality Atom Araullo. She said that Atom's activism also came into him personally, during the protests against then-president Joseph Estrada.
