= UP Diliman Department of Chemical Engineering =

Academic department of University of the Philippines Diliman

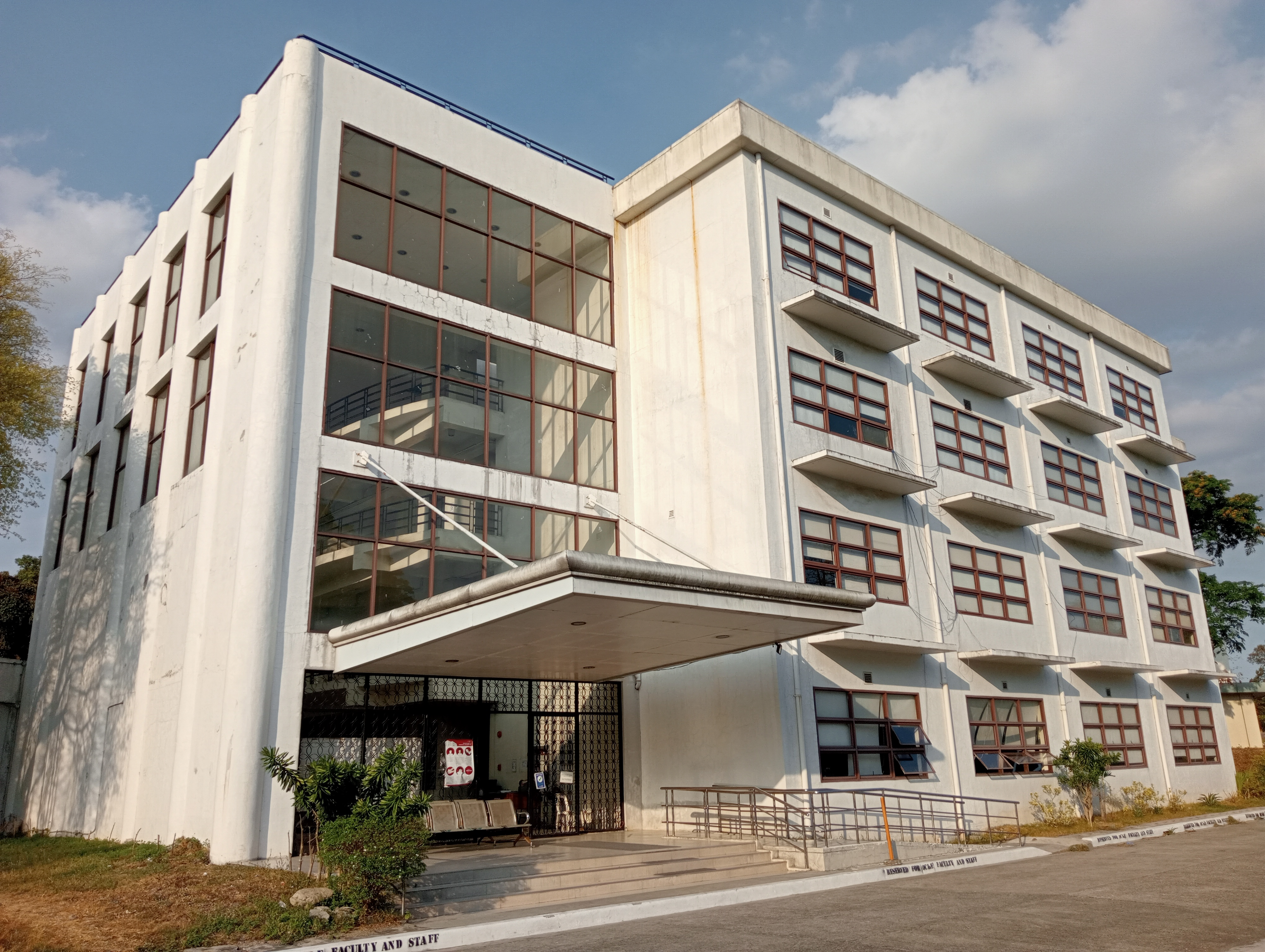
- Department of Chemical Engineering (DChE) Building, U.P. Diliman
- Type: Learning/research institute
- Established: 1956
- Parent institution: UP Diliman
- Location: Quezon City, Philippines
- Campus: University of the Philippines Diliman
- Website: Official website

The Department of Chemical Engineering (DChE) is an academic department operating under the College of Engineering of the University of the Philippines Diliman.

The department was established in 1956 and has an overall 90% passing rate in the licensure examinations held in the Philippines. It also contributes about 10% to 60% of the total number of new chemical engineers in the Philippines every year.

== Course offerings ==
The department offers undergraduate and graduate programs leading to the degree of chemical engineering:

- Bachelor of Science in Chemical Engineering (BS ChE) — five-year program leading to the understanding of transport processes, chemical engineering thermodynamics and their applications to unit operations design, thermodynamics and reaction kinetics.
- Master of Science in Chemical Engineering (MS ChE) — 24-unit coursework that includes core and elective courses related to chemical engineering and six units of master's thesis.
- Doctor of Philosophy in Chemical Engineering (PhD ChE)

== Research laboratories ==
The department consists of thirteen (13) research laboratories in different fields of chemical engineering and allied fields, and also hosts the Chemical Engineering Analytical Laboratory (CEAL), which offers analytical services to the university and industry.

CEAL houses a Scanning Electron Microscope (SEM), a Fourier-Transform Infrared (FTIR) Spectroscope, a Universal Testing Machine (UTM); gas chromatographs (FID, TCD, MS), Ion Chromatographs, and high-performance liquid chromatograph (HPLC); the department also has a Kjeldahl apparatus, a Karl Fischer apparatus, and an atomic absorption spectrophotometer (AAS). There is a real-time PCR, and digital gradient electrophoresis, shaking incubators and refrigerated incubators for biological studies.

The thirteen (13) research laboratories are the following:

- Advanced Materials and Organic Synthesis Laboratory
- Bioprocess Engineering Laboratory
- Catalysis Research Laboratory
- Chemical Engineering Intelligence Learning Laboratory
- Environmental Process Engineering Laboratory
- Fuels, Energy and Thermal Systems Laboratory
- Green Materials Laboratory
- Inorganic Synthesis Laboratory
- Laboratory of Electrochemical Engineering
- Molecular Modelling Laboratory
- Nanotechnology Research Laboratory
- Process Systems Engineering Laboratory
- Sustainable Production & Responsible Consumption Laboratory
