= Mon Ramirez =

Filipino electrical engineer, activist, and martial law survivor

Ramon "MonRam" Ramirez (1944–2021) was a Filipino electrical engineer, activist, and martial law survivor best known for his many years as advocating for transparency and fairness in the Philippines' public utilities sector; for his role in the establishment of Advocates of Science and Technology for the People (AGHAM) and People's Alternative Media Network (Altermidya); for his role in the analysis which led to the 2002 Republic of the Philippines v. Manila Electric Company (Meralco) case in which the Supreme Court of the Philippines ordering Meralco to refund or credit about ₱29 billion excess charges collected from its customers; as a prominent figure in the resistance against Martial law under Ferdinand Marcos during which he was detained twice; and for his advocacy of preserving the public memory of the horrors of the Martial Law era, establishing the Arkibong Bayan ("The People's Archives") initiative.

== See also ==
- Gaston Ortigas
- Edwin Laguerder
