= Juinio =

Juinio is a surname. Notable people with the surname include:

- Alfredo Juinio, Filipino civil engineer, educator, and public official
- Poch Juinio (born 1973), Filipino basketball player

== See also ==
- Juninho
