= University of the Philippines College of Engineering =

Engineering college in the Philippines

- Unibersidad ng Pilipinas Diliman; Kolehiyo ng Inhinyeriya
- Former names: College of Engineering and Architecture
- Motto: Knowledge, Progress, Service
- Type: Public University; Research University; Degree-granting unit of the University of the Philippines Diliman
- Established: July 10, 1910
- Parent institution: UP Diliman
- Dean: Prof. Maria Antonia N. Tanchuling, Ph.D.
- Location: Melchor Hall, Osmena Ave, University of the Philippines, Diliman, Quezon City
- Website: coe.upd.edu.ph

The University of the Philippines Diliman College of Engineering is a degree-granting unit of the University of the Philippines Diliman specializing in chemical, civil, computer, electrical, electronic, geodetic, industrial, materials, mechanical, metallurgical, and mining engineering.

It is the largest degree-granting unit in the UP System in terms of student population and is also known formally as UP COE, COE, and informally as Engg (pronounced "eng").

The college of Engineering is composed of eight departments, three of which are housed in the historic Melchor Hall along Osmeña Avenue in the U.P. Diliman campus. These are the Department of Mechanical Engineering (DME), the Department of Geodetic Engineering (DGE), and the Department of Industrial Engineering and Operations Research (DIE/OR).

The Electrical and Electronics Engineering Institute (EEEI) has its own pair of buildings along Velázquez Street facing the entrance to the National Science Complex, while the Department of Computer Science (DCS) moved into their own building beside the EEEI building in early 2007. Since then, the Department of Mining, Metallurgical, and Materials Engineering (DMMME), the Department of Chemical Engineering (DChE), and the Institute of Civil Engineering (ICE) have also moved into their own respective buildings at the Engineering Complex, with each building facing C.P. Garcia Avenue.

The College Library is located in two different buildings: one in the Melchor Hall and another in the building that houses the DCS.

The College of Engineering is the College in the Philippines with the most CHED Centers of Excellence at eleven (11). All of its degree-granting departments have been recognized as a Center of Excellence.

== History ==
=== Establishment ===
The University of the Philippines was founded on June 18, 1908. The College of Engineering is the fifth college unit to be established. The university's board of regents (BOR), in a resolution passed on June 3, 1910, appointed Mr. W.J. Colbert as acting dean of the college. His appointment was set to effect on June 13, 1910, thereby creating the College of Engineering. The classes were held at a two-story building, the O’brien residence, at the corner of Isaac Peral (now United Nations Avenue) and Florida (now Maria Y. Orosa) streets in Ermita, Manila. The O’Brien house was formally turned over to the college in September 1910, and became known as the “College of Engineering.” Later on, as the Engineering Building and shops were constructed along the Florida side of the U.P. Campus in Ermita, that building became the Home Economics Building of the College of Education.

The plans for the construction of a three-story reinforced concrete Engineering Building were drafted starting 1927, for which P210,000 was appropriated. The design of the building was under the supervision and guidance of Dean Hyde. Criteria for earthquake resistance were incorporated in the design. It was of simple architecture with a portico at the front facing Florida Street. The contract for the construction was awarded on October 22, 1929. The building was occupied in May 1930.

=== World War II ===
Then the tides of war in the Pacific came in December 1941 and thereby interrupted the normal operations of the college. When the Japanese forces entered Manila in January 1942, they occupied the college buildings. It was in January 1943 that classes were resumed. During the war years, engineering classes were conducted in the Pharmacy building on Herran (now Pedro Gil) street. Offices of the faculty members where in the shacks behind the College of Medicine building. Once more classes were interrupted. The Battle of Manila practically demolished all the university buildings in the Padre Faura campus which had been occupied by the Japanese army forces. The college and few other units of the university reopened in August 1945 under very trying conditions on account of the destruction of the engineering building, shops and laboratories. Classes were held at the Cancer Institute Building facing Padre Faura Street.

The task of rehabilitating the college started immediately after. Repair work of the Engineering Building along Calle Florida was started in 1946 and was reoccupied in August 1946.

=== Postwar move to the Diliman campus ===
In the new Diliman Campus, despite the fact that most students commuted from Manila (at that time via España, Sta. Mesa and Katipunan Road), the enrollment in the university steadily increased. The university, however, started the huge construction program of college building, laboratories, dormitories and other facilities. The construction of the engineering building on the north side of the campus was begun in 1949 along with other buildings.

In 1951 the college moved into the new four-story building along Osmeña Avenue, a mirror image of the Liberal Arts Building across the wide, dampy University Quadrangle.

During the 1963 U.P. Alumni Engineers Homecoming, the Engineering Building was named Melchor Hall in honor of the late Col. Alejandro Melchor. He was an engineering alumnus, former member of the engineering faculty and the U.P. Board of Regents, Secretary of National Defense in the Philippine Cabinet in exile during World War II, and a researcher whose studies on pontoon bridges contributed significantly in winning the war for the Allied Forces. Dedication ceremonies were held, and a plaque was unveiled at the portico of the edifice with President Romulo as guest speaker and the family of Alejandro Melchor present.

=== Martial law ===
Many students, faculty, and alumni of the UP College of Engineering were deeply affected when President Ferdinand Marcos announced on September 23, 1972 that he had placed the entirety of the Philippines under Martial Law. Prof. Dominador Ilio was arrested at his home in UP campus because they could not find his son, Dominador Jr. He was only released from Camp Crame a month later, once his son had been captured. Student Reynaldo Vea, who would later become Dean of the college, was likewise arrested as a spokesman of the Samahan ng Demokratikong Kabataan (SDK). Prominent alumnus Mon Ramirez was caught in Marikina by the Intelligence Service of the Armed Forces of the Philippines (ISAFP).

Eleven alumni of the UP College of Engineering would later be recognized as either martyrs or heroes of the fight against authoritarianism, by having their names etched at the Wall of Remembrance at the Philippines' Bantayog ng mga Bayani (lit. Monument of Heroes).

Dubbed the "Heroes of Melchor" hall, this group includes:

- Magtanggol Roque,
- Gaston “Gasty” Ortigas,
- Floro Balce,
- Antonio “Tonyhil” Hilario,
- Wright Molintas, Jr.,
- Edwin “Nono” Laguerder,
- Vergel "Butch" Landrito,
- Bayani Lontok,
- Mariano “Rak” Lopez,
- Ruben Lunas, and
- Arnulfo “Noli” Resus.

== Melchor Hall ==
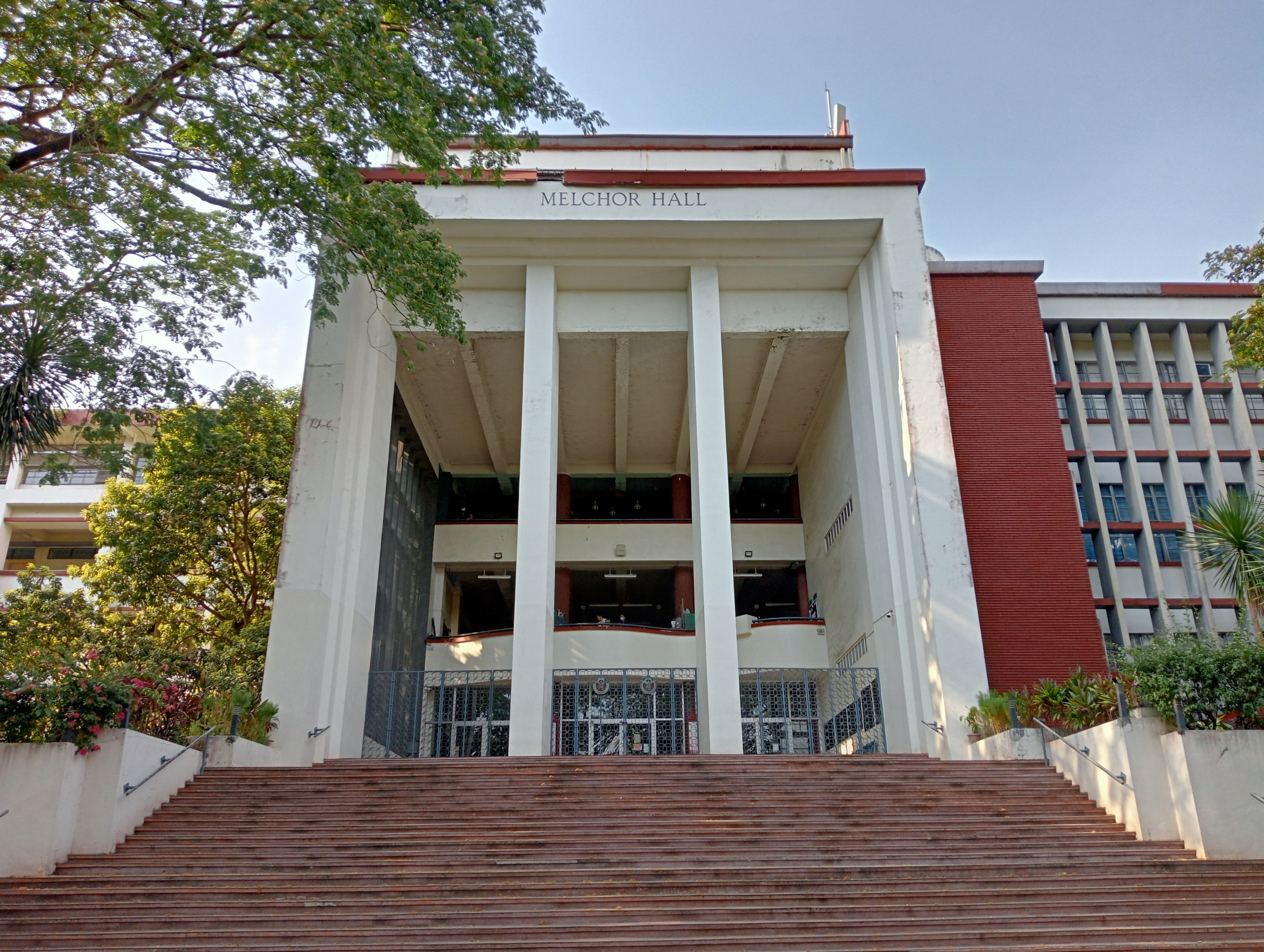
Melchor Hall of the UP Diliman College of Engineering

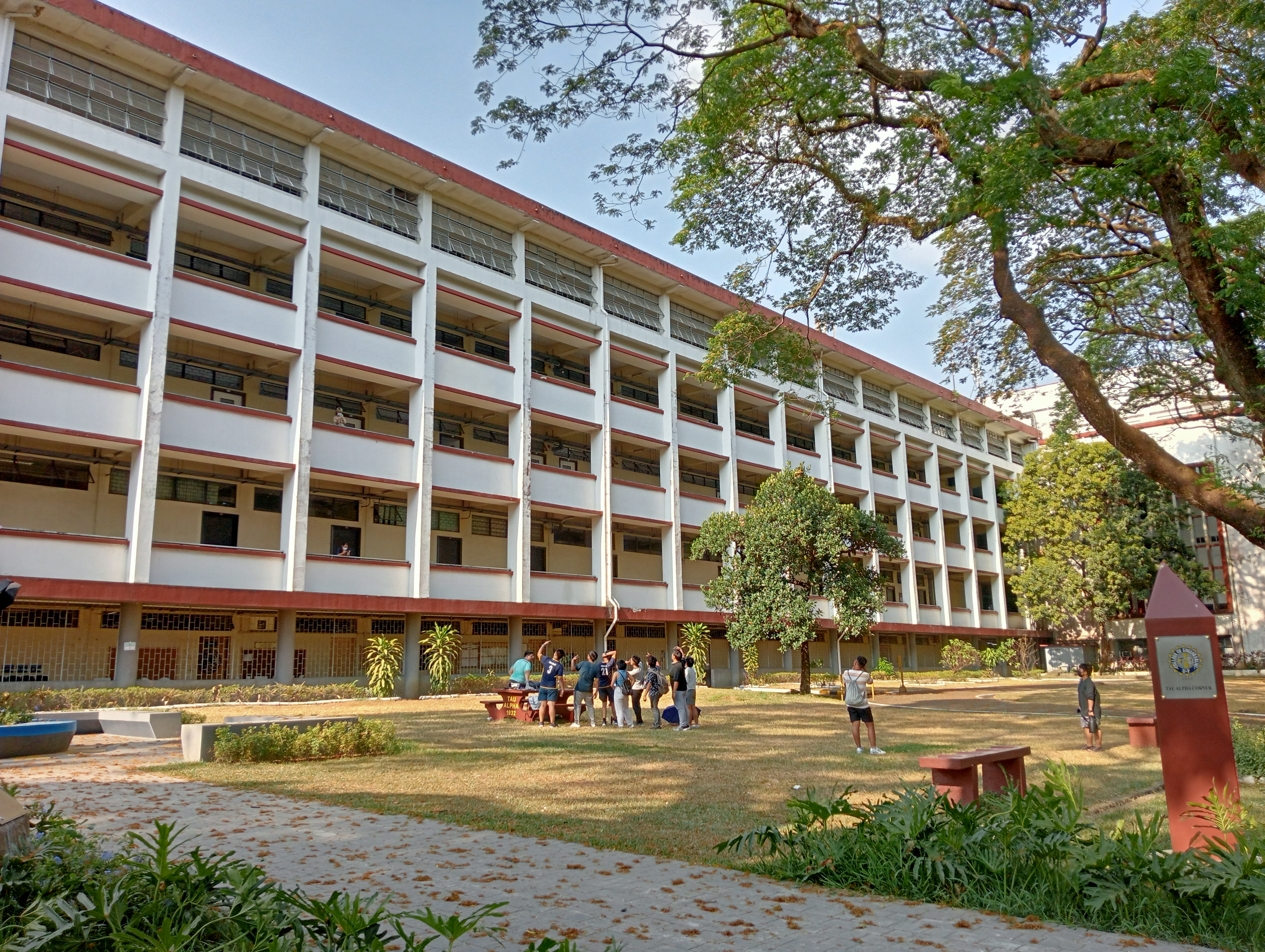
West Wing of Melchor Hall, U.P. Diliman

Melchor Hall, the current main building of the University of the Philippines Diliman College of Engineering, is the work of Architect Cesar Concio. His other notable works are the Church of the Risen Lord inside the UP campus, the Palma Hall (College of Social Sciences and Philosophy building), the Insular Life building and the Children's Hospital, among others.

The building is heavily influenced by the Bauhaus school of design and the challenge of building design without frills. It is a long horizontal, five-story reinforced concrete building designed in planar forms tempered with Filipino design expression. Internal spaces flow rather than being rigidly boxed.

Melchor Hall is a symmetrical structure which is divided into two wings by an imposing central section. This large rectangular three-story-high portal serves as the main entrance of the building. An equally imposing concrete stairway terminates at the portal, flanked by 2 plain columns that soar three stories high.

Each wing of the structure features continuous open balconies on each floor which serve as single-loaded corridors to the classrooms. The architectural design creates well-ventilated, naturally lighted classrooms. Stairs that service the five floors are wide with comfortable treads and risers. Structural members are in all honesty defined on both the exterior and interior of the building. There is a grid of discreet sun baffles at the west side of the entrance hall.

== Academic departments ==
=== Department of Chemical Engineering ===
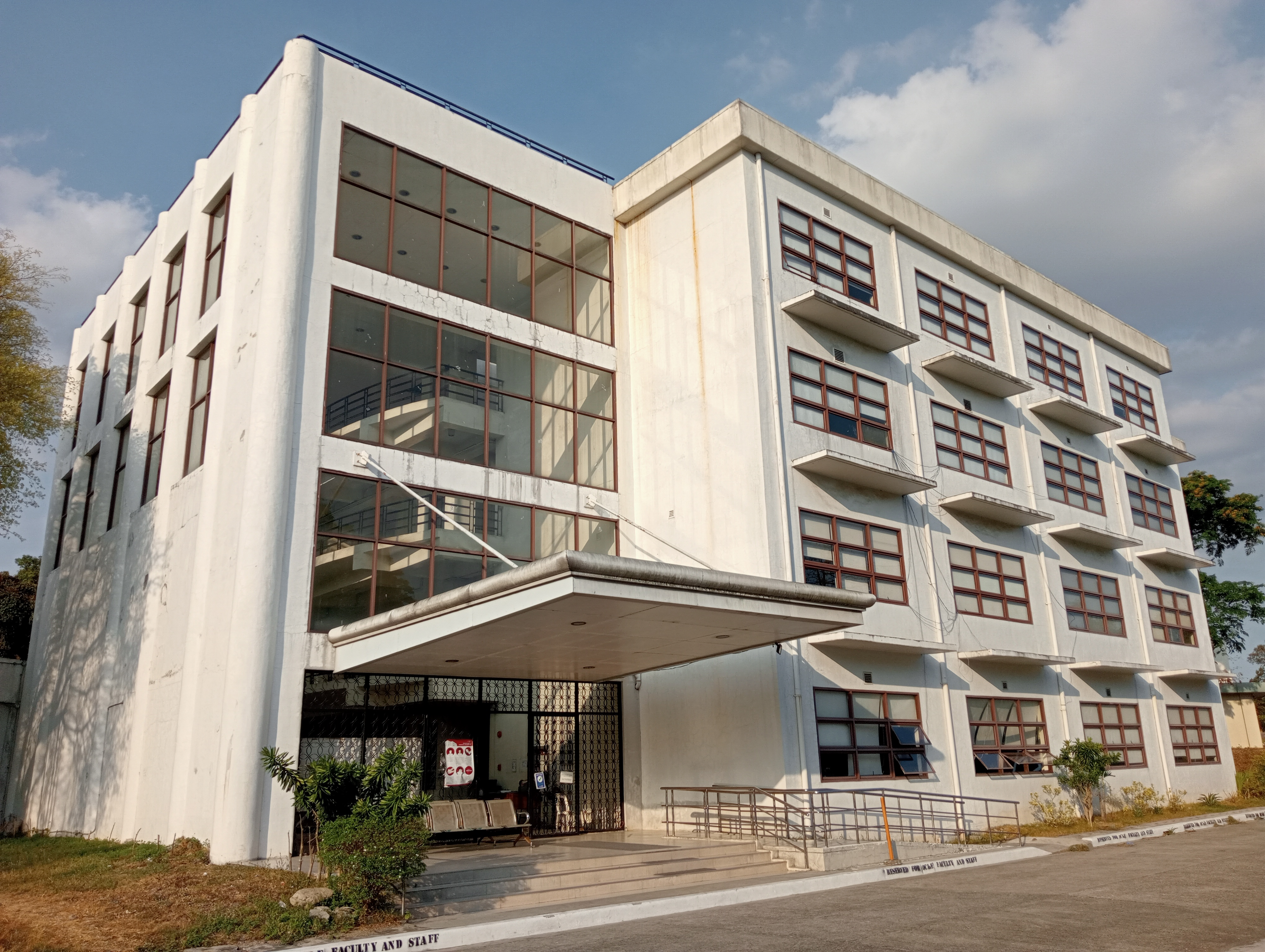
Department of Chemical Engineering (DChE) Building

The Department of Chemical Engineering (DChE) offers undergraduate and graduate programs leading to the degree of chemical engineering. The department was established in 1956 and has an overall 90% passing rate in the licensure examinations held in the Philippines. Furthermore, the department contributes about 10% to 60% of the total number of new chemical engineers in the Philippines every year.

The department offers the following degrees:

- Bachelor of Science in Chemical Engineering (BS ChE) — five-year program leading to the understanding of transport processes, chemical engineering thermodynamics and their applications to unit operations design, thermodynamics and reaction kinetics.
- Master of Science in Chemical Engineering (MS ChE) — 24-unit coursework that includes core and elective courses related to chemical engineering and six units of master's thesis.
- Doctor of Philosophy in Chemical Engineering (PhD ChE)

=== Institute of Civil Engineering ===
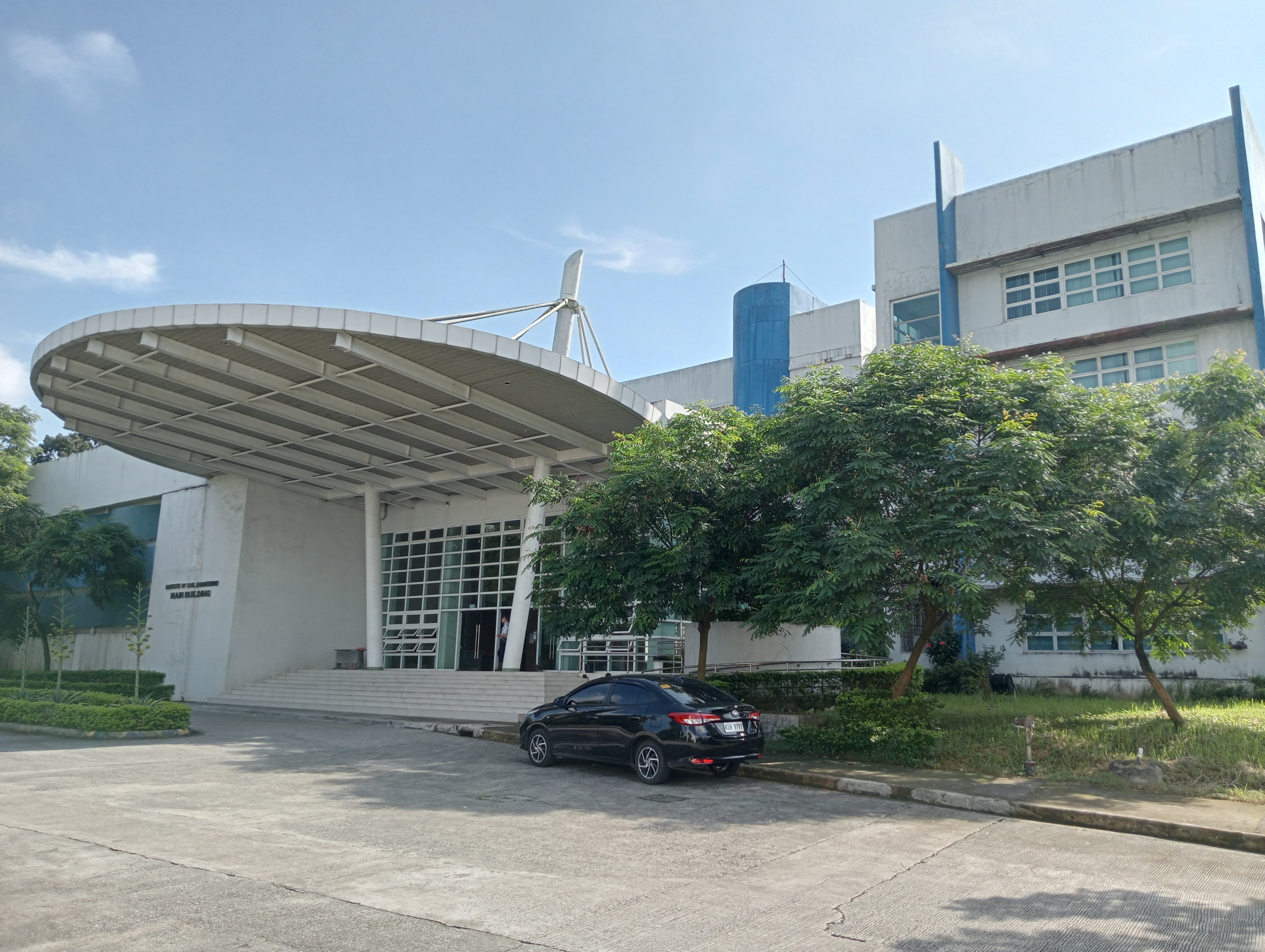
Institute of Civil Engineering (ICE) Building

The Institute of Civil Engineering (ICE) offers undergraduate and graduate programs leading to the degree of civil engineering. The oldest of the college's departments, the institute was established as a department in 1910. In 1915, the first graduates of civil engineering were produced. In 2008, the department was elevated into an institute, when its student population gradually expanded. Civil engineering graduates from the college represents only 1–2% of civil engineering output of the Philippines each year.

The institute offers the following degrees:

- Bachelor of Science in Civil Engineering (BS CE) — five-year program leading to the understanding of several areas of civil engineering including construction engineering and management, environmental and energy engineering, geotechnical engineering, transportation engineering, structural engineering and water resources engineering.
- Master of Science in Civil Engineering (MS CE) — the department offers several master's degree in the following fields:

- MS CE in Geotechnical Engineering
- MS CE in Structural Engineering
- MS CE in Transportation Engineering
- MS CE in Water Resources Engineering

- Doctor of Philosophy in Civil Engineering (PhD CE) — the department offers several doctor's degree in the following fields:

- PhD CE in Geotechnical Engineering
- PhD CE in Structural Engineering
- PhD CE in Transportation Engineering
- PhD CE in Water Resources Engineering

=== Department of Computer Science ===
The Department of Computer Science (DCS) offers undergraduate and graduate programs leading to the degree of computer science. The department started way back in the 1970s when the now defunct Department of Engineering Sciences, Department of Electrical Engineering (both in the College of Engineering) and Department of Mathematics of the College of Science instituted the Master of Engineering in Computer Science (MEngg CS) program. The suspension of MEngg CS in the 1980s led to the creation of the Bachelor of Science in Computer Science program. In 1988, the Board of Regents approved the creation of the Department of Engineering and Computer Sciences (DECS). In 1991, however, DECS was split into the Department of Engineering Sciences and the Department of Computer Science.

The department offers the following programs:

- Bachelor of Science in Computer Science (BS CS) — four-year program that leads to the understanding of algorithms and data structures, programming languages, computer architecture, numerical and symbolic computations, operating systems, software development methodology and engineering, database and information retrieval and artificial intelligence.
- Master of Science in Computer Science — several coursework that leads to the full understanding of operating, intelligent, database, information and application systems, and computer networks and distributed systems.

=== Electrical and Electronics Engineering Institute ===
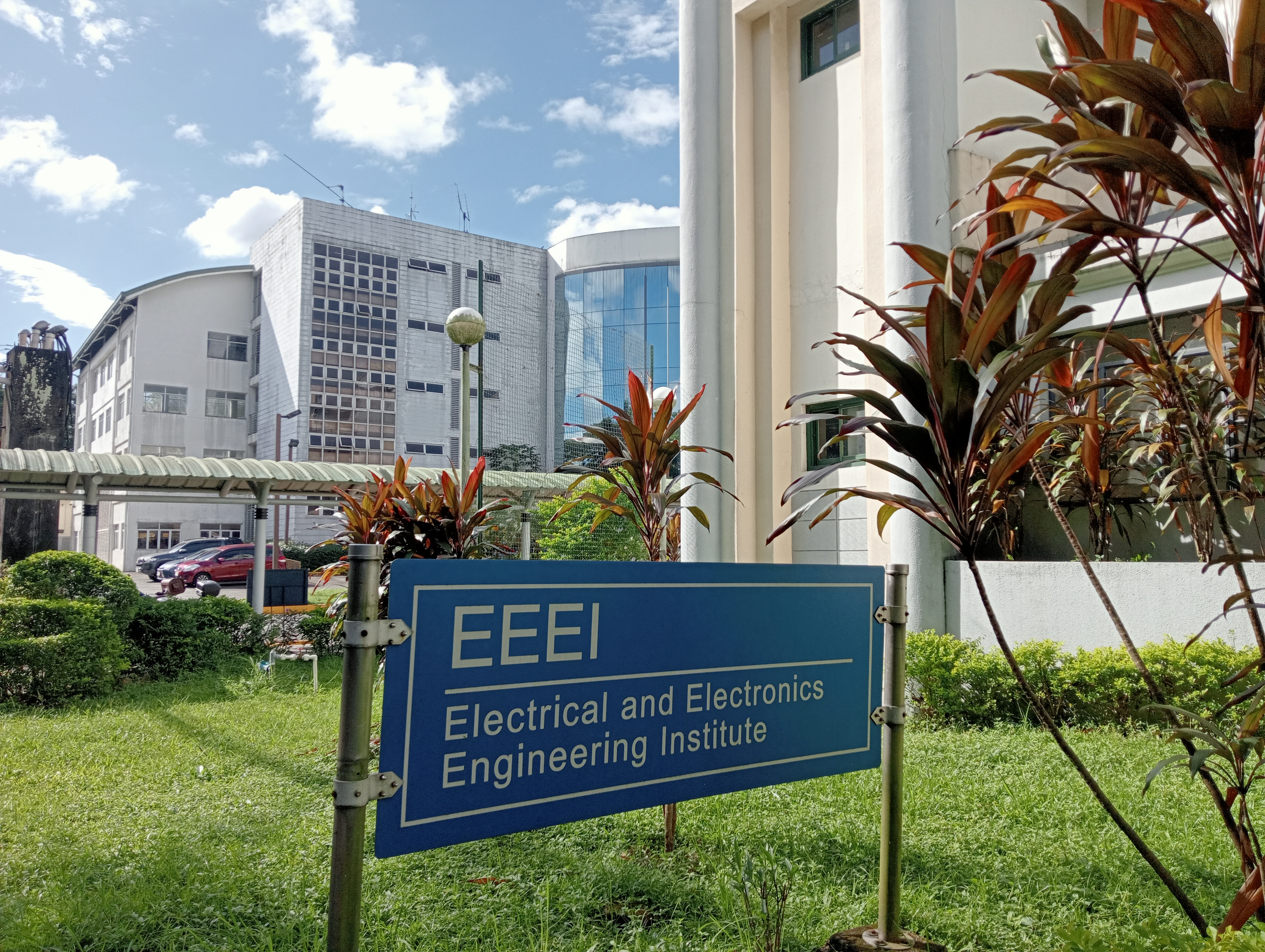
Electrical and Electronics Engineering Institute (EEEI) Building

The Electrical and Electronics Engineering Institute (EEEI) offers three undergraduate programs leading to the degree of electrical engineering, electronics and communications engineering and computer engineering exclusively. The institute started as the Department of Electrical Engineering and was renamed Department of Electrical and Electronics Engineering in 1994. In 2001, the department transferred to its current location along Velasquez St. from its former building at German Yia Hall, beside Melchor Hall. In 2008, the department was elevated into an institute.

The institute offers the following degrees:

- Bachelor of Science in Computer Engineering (BS CoE) — four-year program leading to the understanding of computer engineering, including digital designs, operating systems, sequential logic synthesis, CPU design, computer networks and computer systems engineering.
- Bachelor of Science in Electrical Engineering (BS EE) — four-year program leading to the understanding of electrical engineering, including electrical equipment and devices, electric machines, power electronics, electric power distribution systems and electrical system design.
- Bachelor of Science in Electronics Engineering (BS ECE) — four-year program leading to the understanding of electronics and communications engineering, including biomedical engineering, digital communications, instrumentation electronics, communication electronics and wired communications.
- Master of Engineering in Electrical Engineering (ME EE)
- Master of Science in Electrical Engineering (MS EE)
- Doctorate in Engineering in Electrical Engineering (DE EE)
- Doctor of Philosophy in Electrical Engineering (PhD EE)

=== Department of Geodetic Engineering ===
The Department of Geodetic Engineering (DGE) offers undergraduate and graduate programs leading to the degree of geodetic engineering. The department was established in 1937 while its research and extension arm, Training Center for Applied Geodesy and Photogrammetry (TCAGP) was created in 1964. The department is housed at the Vila (East) Wing of Melchor Hall.

DGE offers the following programs:

- Bachelor of Science in Geodetic Engineering (BS GE) — four-year program leading to the understanding of geodetic and geomatics engineering, including surveying, cartography, geographic information system, geodesy, remote sensing, photogrammetry, global navigation satellite systems, land laws, and land valuation.
- Master of Science in Geomatics Engineering (BS GmE) — the department offers several master's degree in the following fields:
  - MS GmE in Applied Geodesy
  - MS GmE in Geoinformatics
  - MS GmE in Remote Sensing

The Department of Geodetic Engineering organizes the biennial Philippine Geomatics Symposium (PhilGEOS), the country's premier conference on geospatial science and technology. It was held annually from 2012–2017 and every two years since then.

=== Department of Industrial Engineering and Operations Research ===
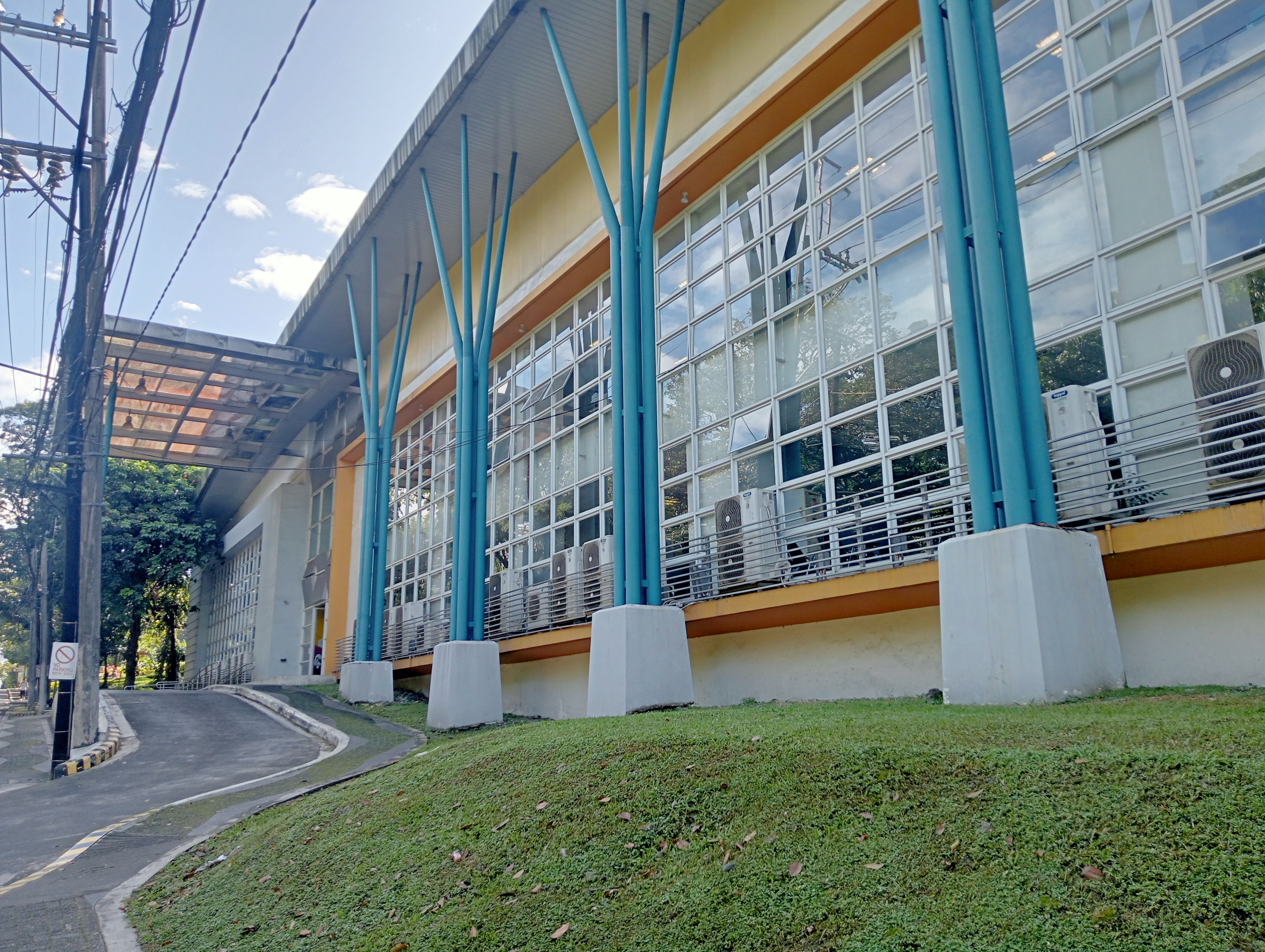
IE/ME Building

The Department of Industrial Engineering and Operations Research (DIE/OR) offers undergraduate and graduate programs leading to the degree of industrial engineering and operations research. The degree program of industrial engineering started in 1965 when the Department of Mechanical Engineering offered students to pursue the career. In 1971, the Department of Industrial Engineering and Operations Research became a separate unit of the college.

For more information on the department: Visit its site at http://updieor.org.ph/

The department offers the following degrees:

- Bachelor of Science in Industrial Engineering (BS IE) — five-year program that leads to the understanding of industrial engineering, design, improvement and installation of integrated systems of people, materials, equipment and energy, production systems, operations research, human factors and ergonomics and information systems.
- Diploma in Industrial Engineering — provides intensive industrial engineering graduates of other fields of science.
- Master of Science in Industrial Engineering (MS IE)

=== Department of Mechanical Engineering ===
The Department of Mechanical Engineering's mission is to consistently produce top quality Mechanical Engineering graduates; continually develop new knowledge and undertake progressive research and development that will contribute to the industrial development of the nation; and provide technical expertise to industry and strengthen linkages and partnerships with other institutions.

The department offers the following programs;

- Bachelor of Science in Mechanical engineering (BS ME) - The major courses in the current 5- year program includes foundation courses in thermal sciences, metrology, kinematics and mechanisms, machine design, manufacturing, and control, as well as specialized courses in internal combustion engines, turbomachinery, power, and heating ventilation, air conditioning and refrigeration (HVACR).
- Master of Science in Mechanical Engineering (MS ME) - Provides advanced training in the methods, tools and techniques of mechanical engineering

=== Department of Mining, Metallurgical and Materials Engineering ===
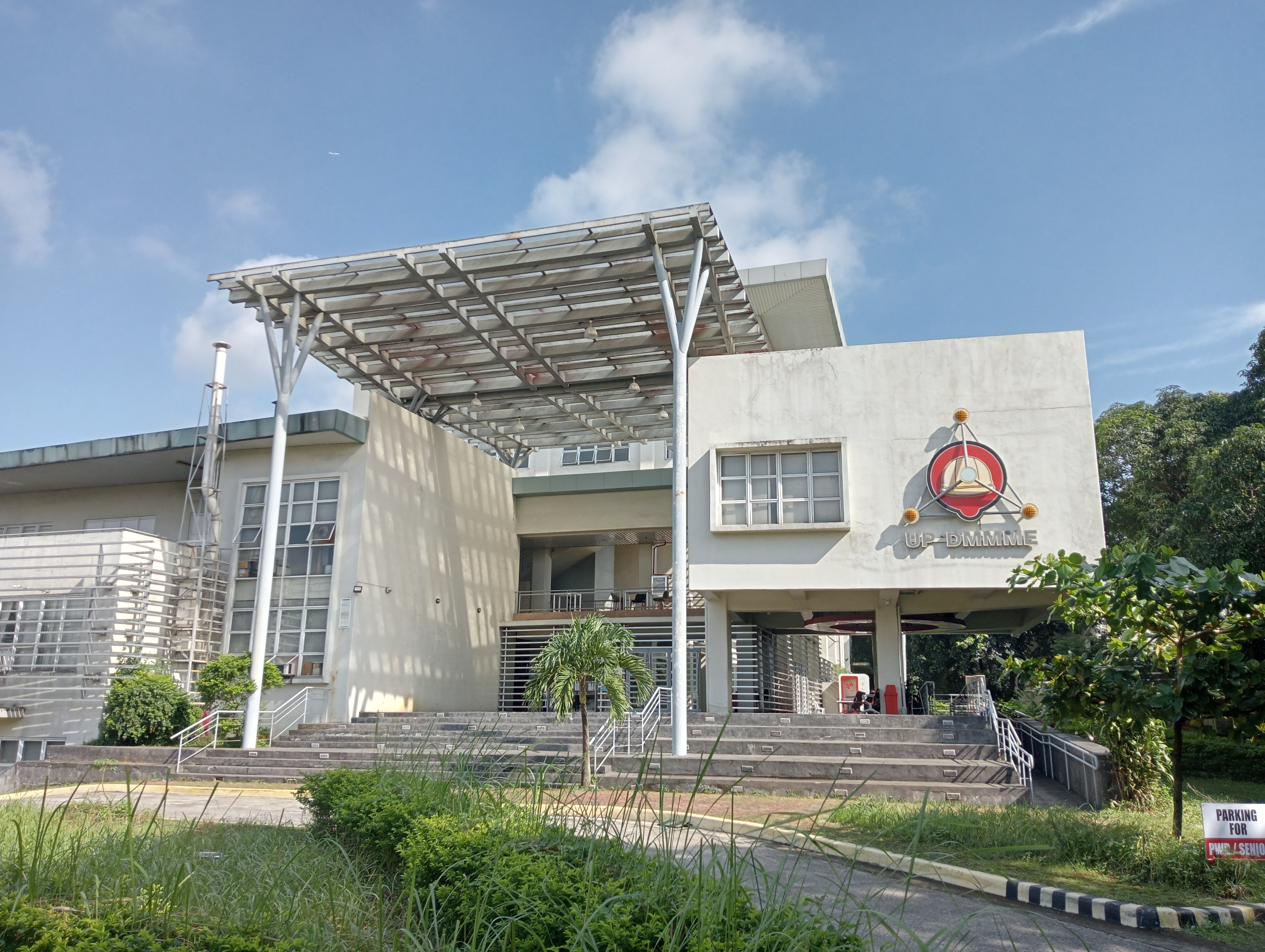
DMMME Building

Mining engineering includes all the aspects of the extraction of mineral products and energy sources from the Earth's crust. The mining engineer is concerned not only with excavation and working of deposits but also with economic analysis, optimization of operations, and environmental and human aspects of exploration.

Metallurgy is the science and art of extracting, refining, and adapting metals from minerals and metal-bearing materials, at a profit, for human use.

Materials are traditionally classified as metals, polymers, and ceramics. This field of engineering specializes on determining the relationship between the structure and the properties of these materials.

The department traces its roots to the time it first offered the B.S. Mining Engineering program, one of the earliest Bachelor of Science degree courses offered by the UP College of Engineering. In 1956 a Metallurgical Engineering undergraduate course was added to what was then the Department of Mining Engineering. Since then, the department has offered several degree programs wherein the medium of instruction for all major courses is in English.

The department offers the following programs;

- Bachelor of Science in Mining Engineering
- Bachelor of Science in Metallurgical Engineering
- Bachelor of Science in Materials Engineering
- Master of Science in Metallurgical Engineering (Extractive metallurgy path)
- Master of Science in Metallurgical Engineering (Physical metallurgy path)
- Master of Science in Materials Science and Engineering (jointly offered with the UP College of Science).
- Doctor of Philosophy in Materials Science and Engineering (jointly offered with the UP College of Science).

The MMME Department offers the following services to private industry, among others: consultancy services, special in-house training in materials science and special topics in metallurgical engineering, assorted testing services involving materials characterization and analysis, pilot plant testing in mineral processing, failure analysis, and mining designs.

The U.P. MMME Department is a CHED Center of Excellence in Metallurgical Engineering and Center of Development (Category 1) in Mining Engineering.

=== Summary ===
Department	B.S.	Diploma	M.S.	M.E.	D.E.	Ph. D.
Department of Chemical Engineering	●		●			●
Institute of Civil Engineering	●		●			●
Department of Computer Science	●		●			
Electrical and Electronics Engineering Institute	●		●	●	●	●
Department of Geodetic Engineering	●		●			
Department of Industrial Engineering and Operations Research	●	●	●			
Department of Mechanical Engineering	●		●			
Department of Mining, Materials and Metallurgical Engineering	●		●			●

== National Centers of Excellence/Development ==
As of 2001, the Commission on Higher Education of the Philippines has identified 32 centers of excellence/development (COEs/CODs) in University of the Philippines Diliman, eleven (11) of which can be found in the College of Engineering. (See all U.P. Diliman Centers of Excellence/Development).

Ten of the eleven COEs/CODs are undergraduate programs in the college, while the eleventh (Information Technology Education) can be considered to be shared between the college's Department of Computer Science and the U.P. Information Technology Training Center. The University of the Philippines Diliman has no program named "Information Technology", unlike other Philippine universities. The COEs/CODs in the college are as follows:

- Chemical Engineering
- Civil Engineering
- Computer Engineering
- Electrical Engineering
- Electronics and Communications Engineering
- Industrial Engineering
- Geodetic Engineering
- Information Technology Education
- Mechanical Engineering
- Metallurgical Engineering
- Mining Engineering

== National Engineering Center ==
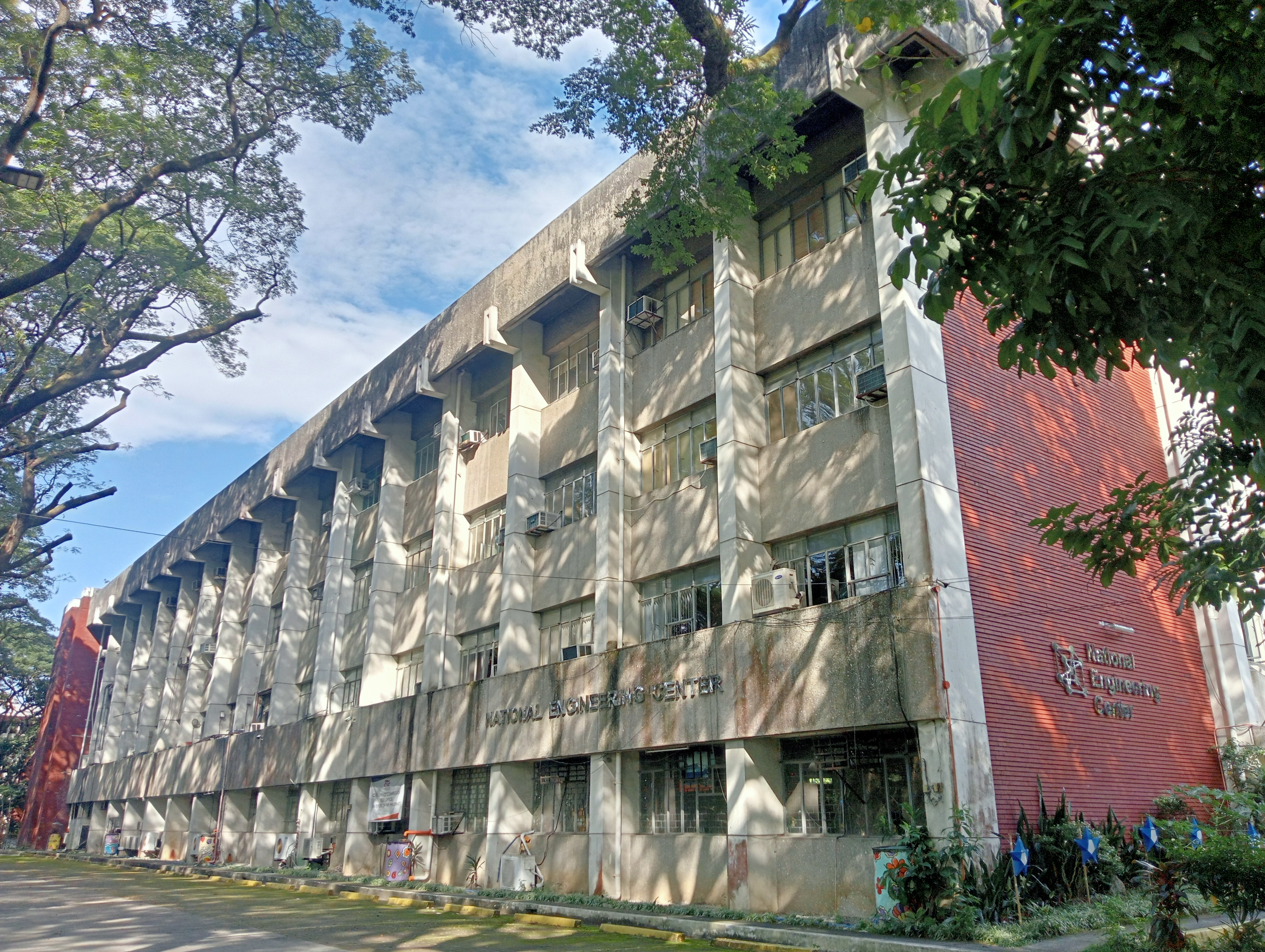
National Engineering Center

The National Engineering Center (NEC) is a related yet independent unit of the College of Engineering. The NEC is under the jurisdiction of the University of the Philippines System and provides research, consultancy, and continuing education services in the engineering and related fields. Whilst the U.P. COE is a unit purely dedicated to academic pursuit, the NEC serves industry and government institutions in need of engineering solutions.

The NEC is housed within the Alfredo Juinio Hall (formerly the National Engineering Center Building), located beside U.P. COE's Melchor Hall along Osmeña Avenue. As of 2006, the College of Engineering Dean, Dr. Rowena Cristina Guevara, also serves as the center's Executive Director.

=== Centers ===
Five centers formerly within the College of Engineering are now in the jurisdiction of the NEC. However, some of these units still classify themselves as falling under the "COE-NEC" umbrella. This should not come as a surprise, as many NEC employees are also U.P. COE professors and instructors.

- Building Research Service(BRS)
- National Center for Transportation Studies (NCTS), formerly the Transport Training Center
- National Hydraulic Research Center (NHRC)
- Training Center for Applied Geodesy and Photogrammetry (TCAGP)
- U.P. Industrial Research Service Center

=== Course offerings ===
- Professional Engineering Training Division
- Engineering Enhancement Program

== College of Engineering Libraries ==
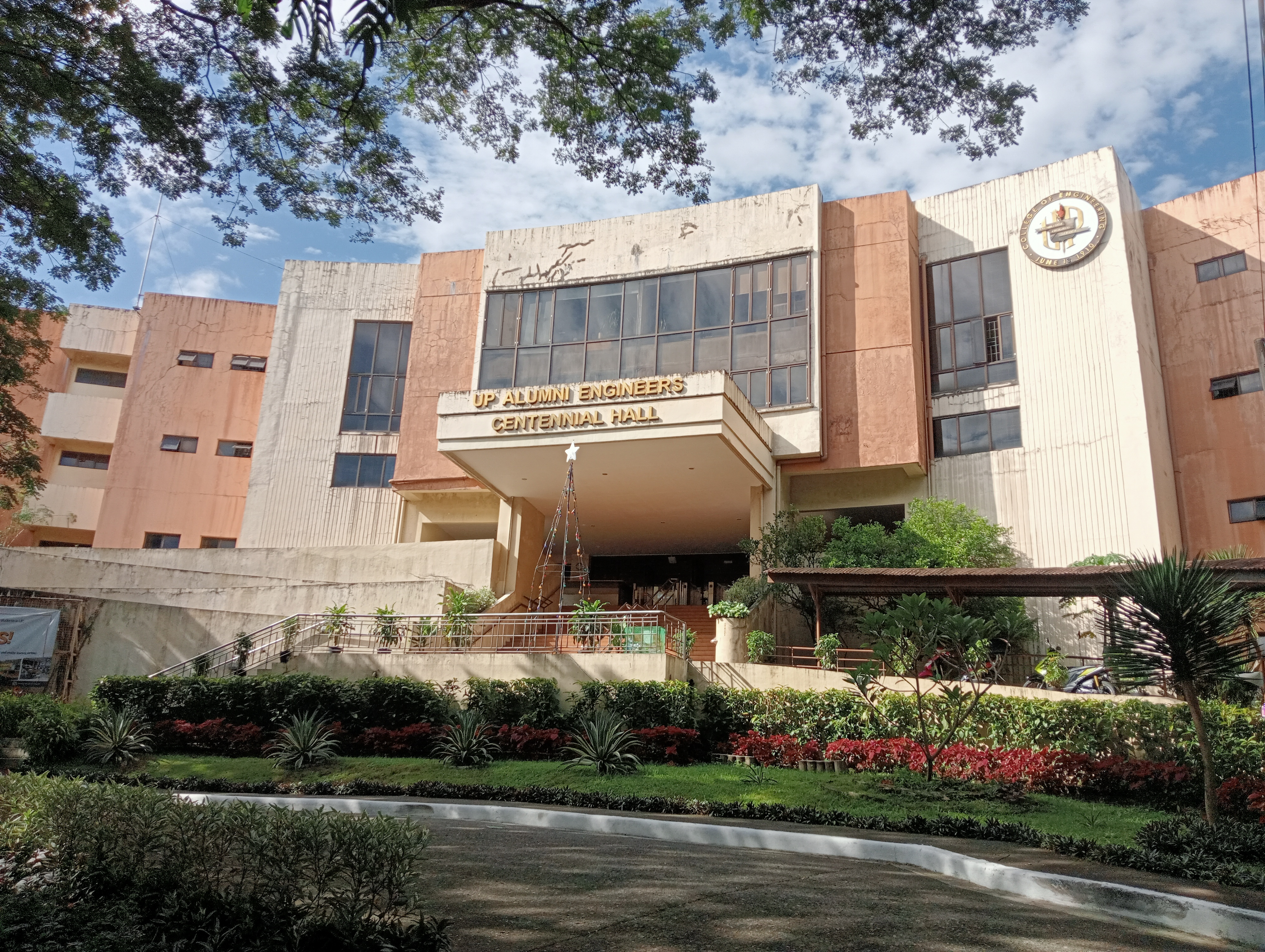
UP Alumni Engineers Centennial Hall

The Libraries of the College of Engineering is the repository of books, dissertations, databases, multimedia resources, journals, magazines, and student and faculty research related to the engineering disciplines being offered by the college. The COE Library envisions itself as the Philippines' National Engineering Library and Information Center in the future.

As of 2006, the library is located in Melchor Hall along Osmeña Avenue, and is divided into two floors. The relatively cramped space of the library will be alleviated once part of it transfers to the new Engineering Library and Computer Science (ELCS) Building, where it is slated to occupy the entire lower two floor levels.

The COE Library is an integral part of the university library's Online Public Access Catalogue (OPAC). The library is also part of the Philippine eLib (Electronic Library) Project.

See also: The College of Engineering Library Website

== College Publications ==
=== The Engineering Logscript ===
The August 2004 issue of The Engineering Logscript.

The official student publication of the college, The Engineering Logscript (or simply "Logscript") is the oldest college-based student publication in UP Diliman, having been established in the 1969–1970 academic year. This makes the Logscript older than the U.P. College of Mass Communication's Plaridel.

Funding for the publication comes from the shared Logscript/Engineering Student Council (ESC) fee paid by students every semester. Unlike other college-based student publications in the university, the Logscript does not have an assigned formal office.

Though the publication's logo and/or masthead varies with every change of the editorial board, the College of Engineering Sundial (or a semblance of it) is always incorporated into the design. The Sundial is a university landmark erected by the U.P. Alumni Engineers.

=== The Sundial ===
The Sundial is the official newsletter of the U.P. Alumni Engineers. Carrying the motto "The time of day it reckons, U.P. Engineers it beckons", the Sundial's first issue came out on October 25, 2004. Like the Logscript, the Sundial has the university landmark of the same name as its emblem.

See also: Sundial electronic issues

=== The U.P. Parser ===
The U.P. Parser is the official student publication of the Department of Computer Science. Founded in 1999, Parser (as it is commonly known) is the oldest department-based publication in the College of Engineering. After a few years of inactivity, Parser was revived in 2004, appearing in four different versions: the print circulation, a website, an email newsletter, and a bulletin board version. In the academic year 2005–2006, Parser reached a milestone by releasing two full-color, tabloid-sized editions, a feat rare for department-based publications.

The newspaper takes its name from the parser of computer science. Its motto is "Analyzing life the CS way".

=== The Reactor ===
The Reactor is the official newsletter of the Department of Chemical Engineering.

=== Currents ===
Currents is the official student publication of the Department of Electrical and Electronics Engineering. After a few years of inactivity, the publication was revived in the academic year 2005–2006. It became inactive once again between 2005 and 2013, before being revived again in 2013.

=== What's Happeneng'g ===
What's Happeneng'g is the official newsletter of the Engineering Student Council (ESC) and comes in booklet format. The publication's name is the combination of the phrase "What's happening" and the college's nickname, "Eng'g".

== College deans ==
Clarence George Wrentmore, Dean 1912–1919

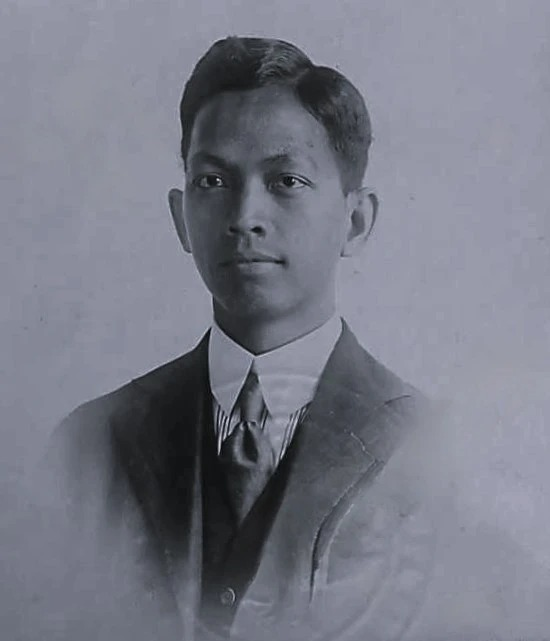
Vidal A. Tan, Dean 1940–1949

- W. J. Colbert (1910–1911, acting dean)
- Lawrence E. Griffin (1911–1912, acting dean)
- Clarence G. Wrentmore (1912–1919)
- Herman W. Reynolds (1919–1926)
- Edward R. Hyde (1926–1940)
- Vidal A. Tan (1940–1949) (Note: Vidal A. Tan afterwards became the eighth President of the University of the Philippines System.)
- Juan L. Tiongson (1949–1953)
- Crisostomo A. Ortigas (1953–1960)
- Oscar Baguio (1960–1970)
- Alfredo L. Juinio (1970–1979) (Note: The National Engineering Center Building was named after Alfredo Juinio.)
- Marino M. Mena (1979–1985)
- Ruben A. Garcia (1985–1991)
- Francisco L. Viray (1991–1993)
- Reynaldo B. Vea (1993–1997) (Note: As of 2006, Dr. Reynaldo Vea is the president of the Mapúa Institute of Technology.)
- Edgardo G. Atanacio (1997–2004)
- Rowena Cristina L. Guevara (2004–2010)
- Aura C. Matias (2010–2016)
- Rizalinda L. de Leon (2016–2019)
- Ferdinand G. Manegdeg (2019–2022)
- Maria Antonia N. Tanchuling (2022–present)
