= UP Diliman Department of Computer Science =

Department in College of Engineering in University of the Philippines - Diliman

- Type: Academic department
- Established: 1981
- Chairperson: John Justine S. Villar, Ph.D.
- Location: UP Alumni Engineers Centennial Hall, Velasquez St., UP Diliman, Quezon City, Philippines; 14°38′55″N 121°4′6″E
- Website: dcs.upd.edu.ph

The Department of Computer Science is one of nine departments in the University of the Philippines Diliman College of Engineering.

== Academic programs ==
The Department of Computer Science administers the four-year bachelor of science in computer science program and the master of science in computer science program. As of AY 2009-2010, the department had 553 undergraduate and 89 graduate students mentored by 27 faculty members, seven of whom are PhD degree holders.

=== Undergraduate ===
The bachelor of science in computer science program is designed to equip the student with knowledge of the fundamental concepts and a reasonable mastery of the basic tools and techniques in computer science. The undergraduate program incorporates the core material, which is universally accepted as common to computer science undergraduate programs (computer programming, computer organization, computer systems, data structures and algorithms, file processing, and programming languages). Underpinning the software orientation of the program are the subjects on database systems, software engineering, artificial intelligence, computer networks and special problems (primarily, software projects).

=== Graduate ===
The master of science in computer science program aims to provide the student with both breadth and depth of knowledge in the concepts and techniques related to the design, programming, and application of computing systems.

The doctor of philosophy in computer science program aims to develop computer scientists who are armed with methods, tools and techniques from both theoretical and systems aspects of computing. They should be able to formulate computing problems and develop new and innovative technology as novel solutions to address those problems. The graduates gain expertise to independently contribute to research and development (R&D) in a specialized area of computer science. The program prepares graduates for professional and research careers in industry, government or academe.

== Research groups ==
=== Algorithms and Complexity Laboratory ===
The Algorithms and Complexity Laboratory (ACL) was co-founded by Henry Adorna Ph.D. and Jaime DL Caro, Ph.D.

Research areas: models of computation and complexity (automata and formal language theory and applications, natural computing, bioinformatics, riceInformatics, formal models for e-voting), Algorithmics, Designs and Implementations (visualization and implementations, algorithmics for hard problems, algorithmic game theory, scheduling problem), combinatorial networks, information technology in education.

=== Computer Security Group ===
The Computer Security Group (CSG) was founded by Susan Pancho-Festin, Ph.D.

Research areas: cryptographic algorithms, message protocols, and coding techniques to enhance enterprise and mobile applications.

=== Computer Vision and Machine Intelligence Group ===
The Computer Vision and Machine Intelligence Group (CVMIG), the first formally organized research group of the department was founded by Prospero Naval Jr., Ph.D.

Research areas: computation intelligence principles in biological, physical, and social systems; projects include machines that understand the deaf, programs that assist medical doctors in diagnosing poison and infections and robots playing football.

=== Networks and Distributed Systems Group ===
The Networks and Distributed Systems Group (NDSG) was founded by Cedric Angelo Festin, Ph.D.

Research areas: fixed and mobile network protocols for more efficient and effective message exchanges. The NDSG is closely affiliated with the Computer Networks Laboratory of the Electrical and Electronics Engineering Institute (EEEI).

=== Scientific Computing Laboratory ===
The Scientific Computing Laboratory (SCL) is currently headed by Adrian Roy Valdez, Ph.D.
The research laboratory is primarily interested in the construction of mathematical models and numerical techniques for optimization, configuration and design of complex systems to better understand scientific, social scientific and engineering problems. It also has five research interest groups, which are Computational Systems Biology and Bioinformatics Group, Intelligent Transport Systems Group, Mathematical Informatics Group, Mathematical and Computational Finance Group, and Data Analytics Group.

=== Service Science and Software Engineering Laboratory (S3) ===
The Service Science and Software Engineering Laboratory (S3) is a research lab where the designs and implementations of service systems are studied, and ensures the creation of software that provide values to others. Research is not limited to just building the software but may also include studies relating to artificial intelligence, networks, etc., as long as products made are essential to people.

=== System Modeling and Simulation Laboratory (SMSL) ===
The System Modeling and Simulation Laboratory (SMSL) is a research lab where mathematics and scientific computing meet! Natural hazards like storm surge and landslides are modeled for early warning and risk assessments. They also model the post-disaster regeneration of mangroves. Other recent modeling efforts were on energy functionals for protein-folding, and visible light-driven hydrogen production.

=== Web Science Group ===
The Web Science Group (WSG) was founded by Rommel Feria, MS.

Research areas: linked data, mobile web, web science and the applications of web technologies in different domains.

== Department chairs ==
- Prof. Evangel P. Quiwa, October 1991 - October 1995
- Prof. Ma. Veronica M. Tayag, November 1995 - April 1999
- Dr. Mark J. Encarnacion, May 1996 - March 2000
- Dr. Jaime D.L. Caro, April 2000 - September 2002
- Dr. Ronald Tuñgol, October 2002 - May 2005
- Dr. Cedric Angelo M. Festin, June 2005 - May 2008
- Dr. Jaime D.L. Caro, June 2008 - March 2011
- Dr. Adrian Roy L. Valdez, March 2011 – May 2013
- Dr. Cedric Angelo M. Festin, June 2013 - March 2014
- Dr. Prospero C. Naval, Jr., April 2014 – March 2017
- Dr. Jan Michael C. Yap, April 2017 – July 2019
- Dr. Jaymar B. Soriano, August 2019 – August 2022
- Dr. John Justine Villar, September 2022 - Present

== Java Competency Center ==
The UP-Mirant Java Education Center and the UP Java Research and Development Center compose the UP Java Competency Center and are part of the ASEAN Java Competency Programme. The UP Java Competency Center is a partnership of the University of the Philippines, Ayala Foundation, Mirant Foundation and Sun Microsystems.

== UP CS Network (UP Alliance of Computer Science Organizations) ==
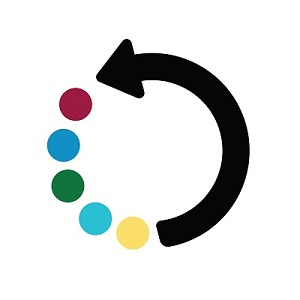
CS Network Logo

UP CS Network logo circa 2009

The UP CS Network is the first student organization alliance of its kind in the UP Diliman College of Engineering. The network is composed of one socio-academic organization (UP CURSOR), one academic organization (UP ACM), two volunteer corps (The UP Parser and DCS Servers), and one service-development organization (UP CSI).

=== Current members ===
- Association for Computing Machinery - UP Diliman Student Chapter, Inc. (UP ACM)
- The UP Parser (Official Student Publication of the DCS)
- UP Association of Computer Science Majors (UP CURSOR)
- UP Center for Student Innovations (UP CSI)
- UP Department of Computer Science Servers (UP DCSS)

=== Former Members ===
- UP Linux Users' Group (UnPLUG)
- DCS Student Assistants (DCS SA)
- Computerized Registration System (CRS)
- UP Engineering Webteam
- UP Computer Society (UP CompSoc)

== Gallery ==
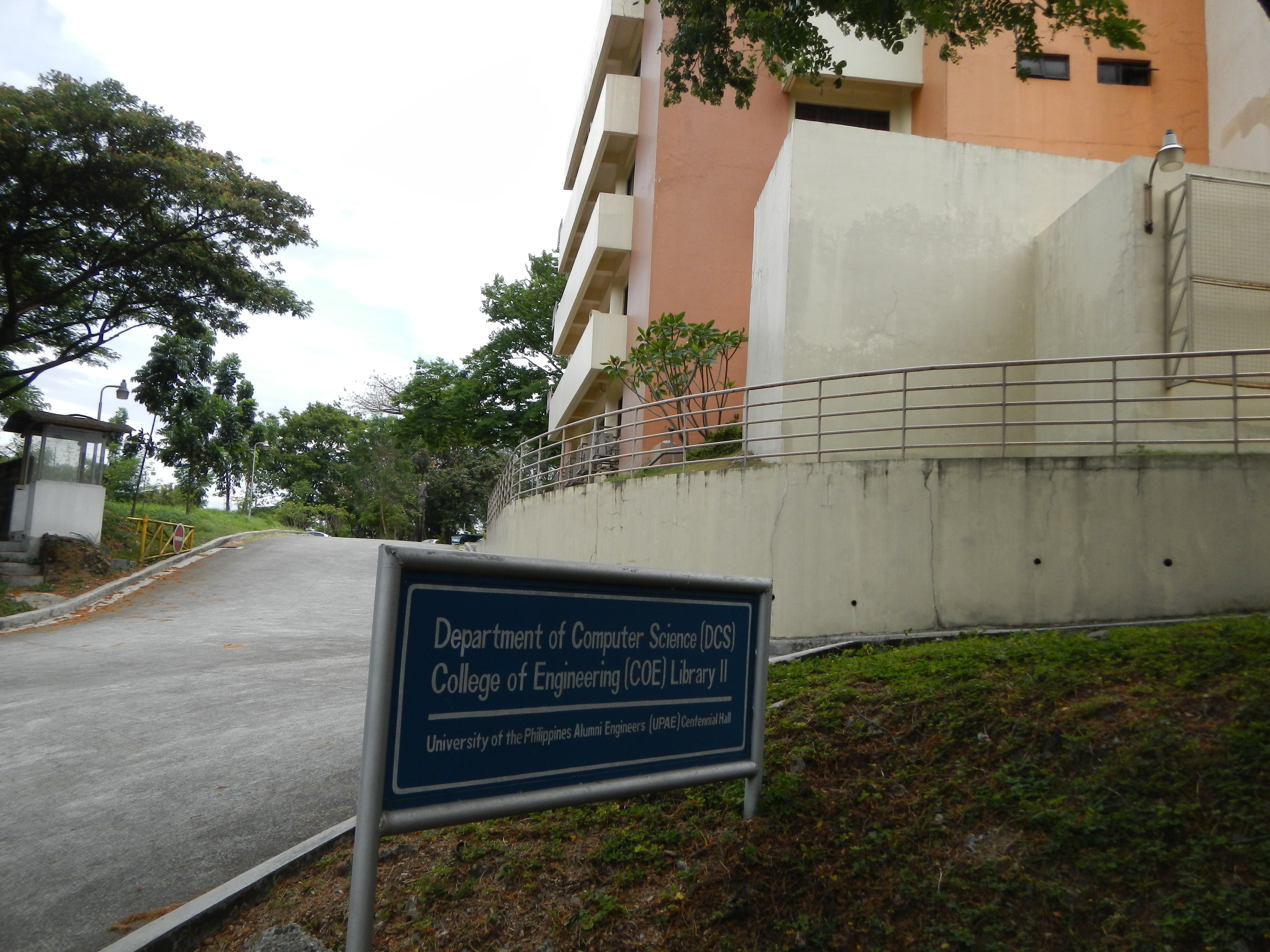
Welcome sign

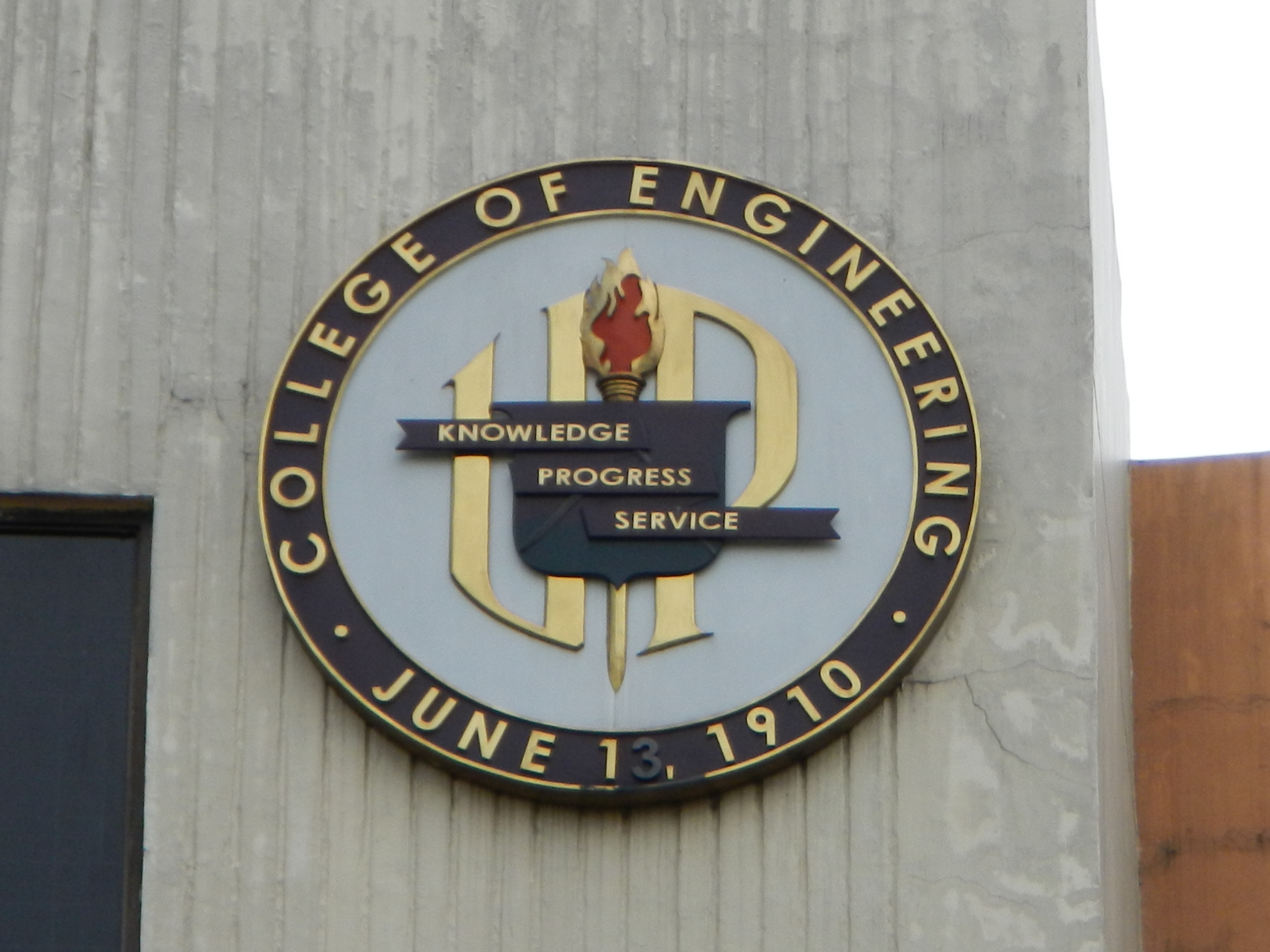
Seal, logo

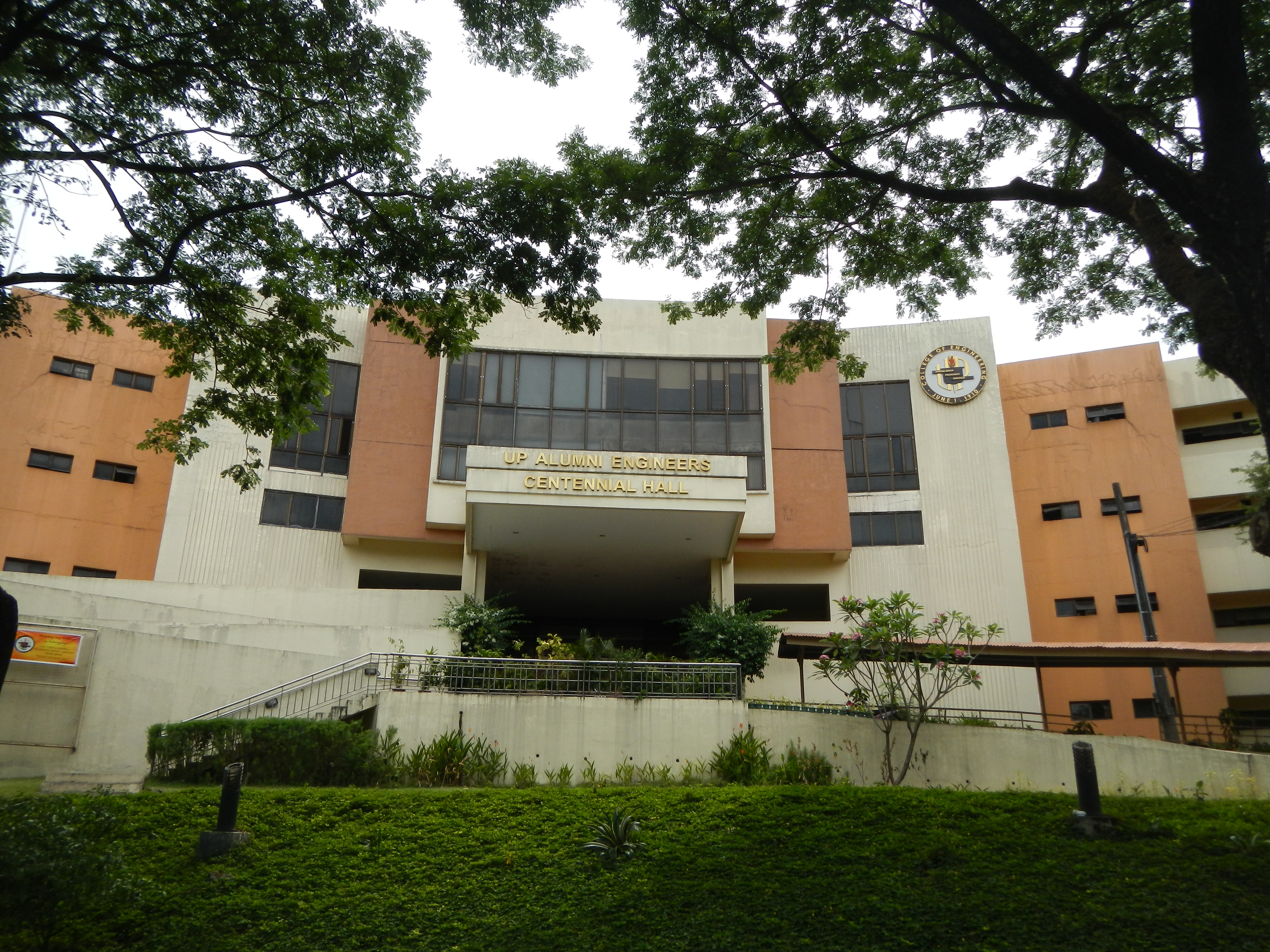
Center facade

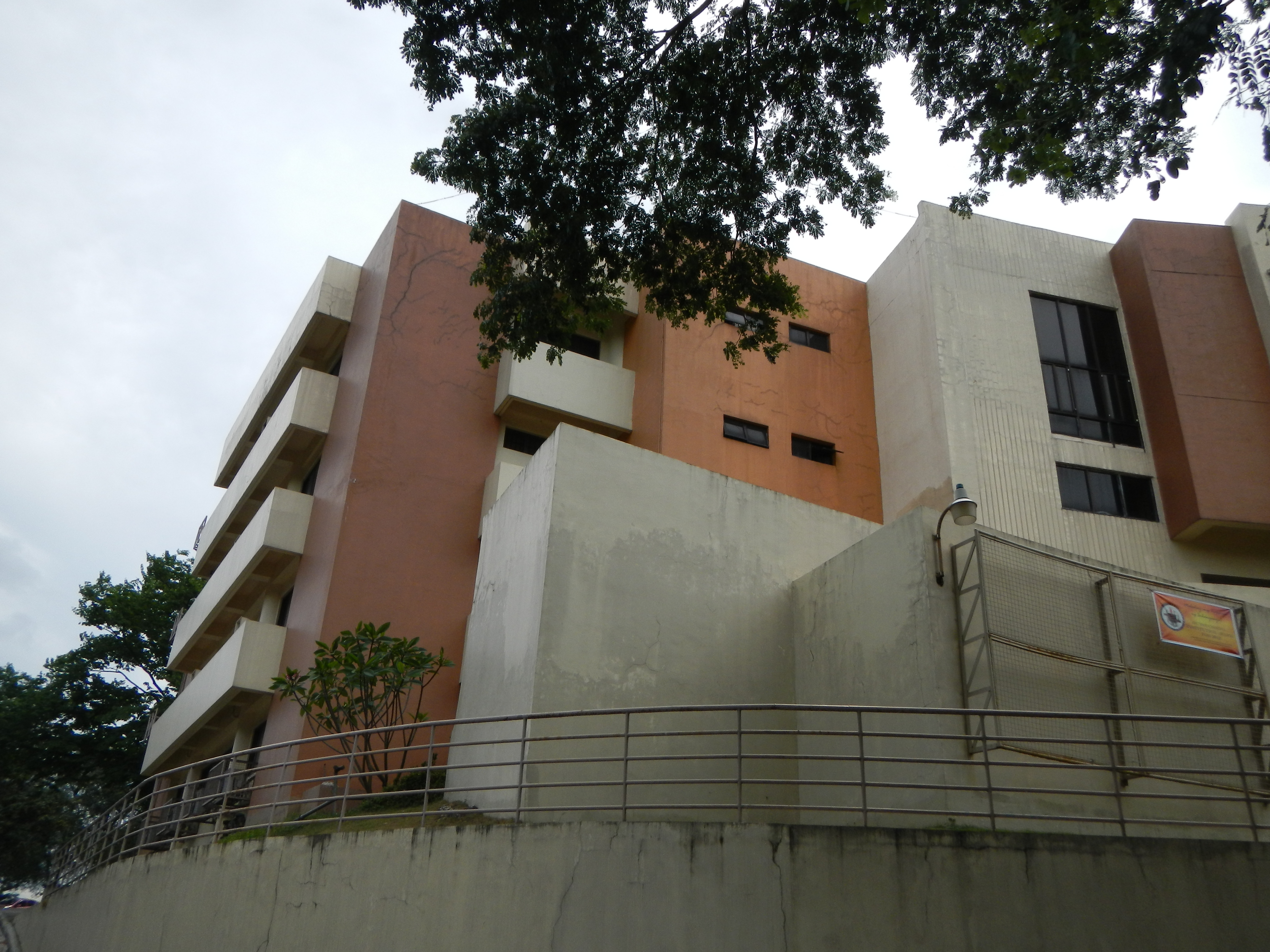
Left facade

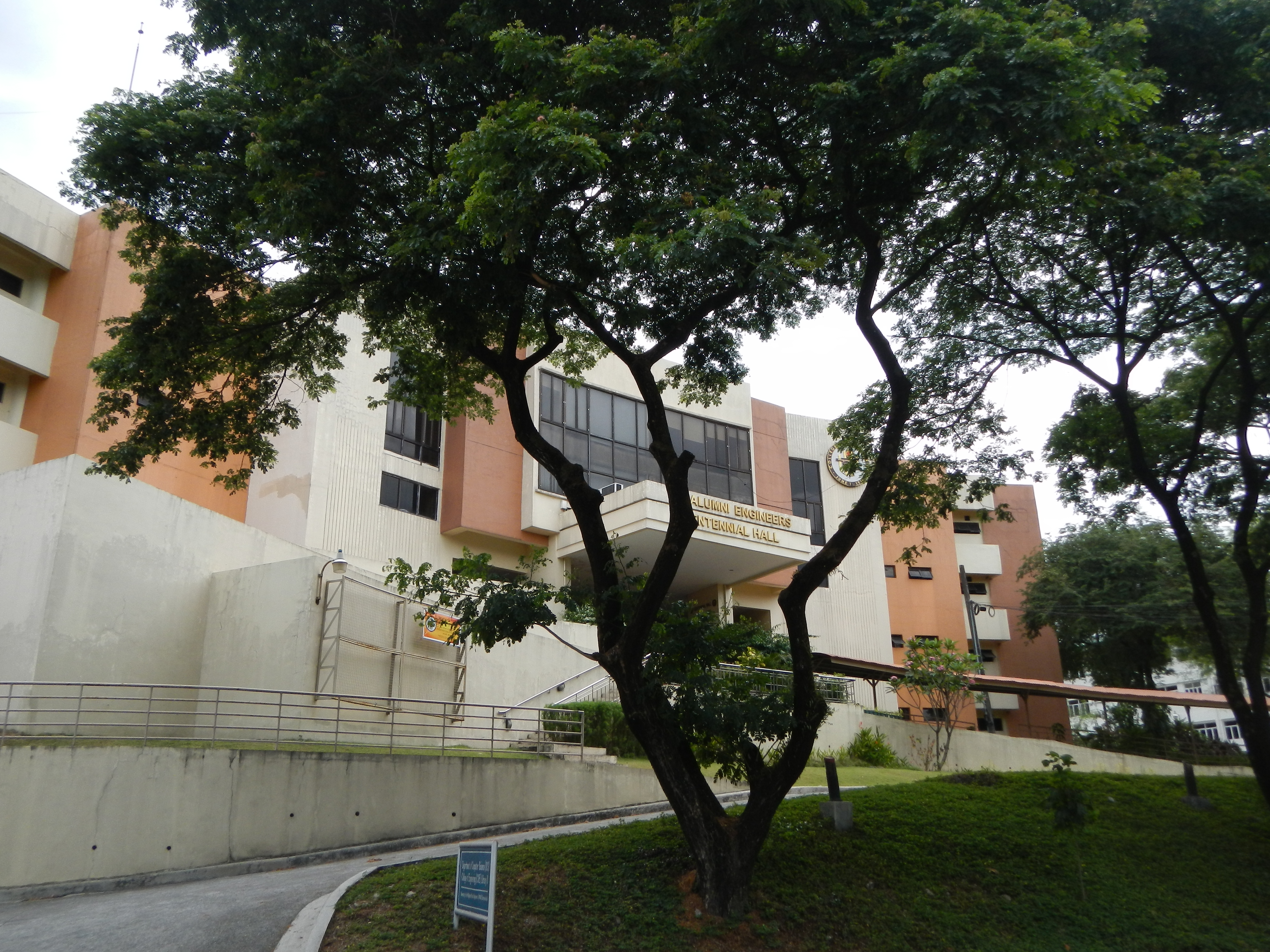
Green tree
