= Alejandro Melchor =

Filipino academic and politician (1900–1947)

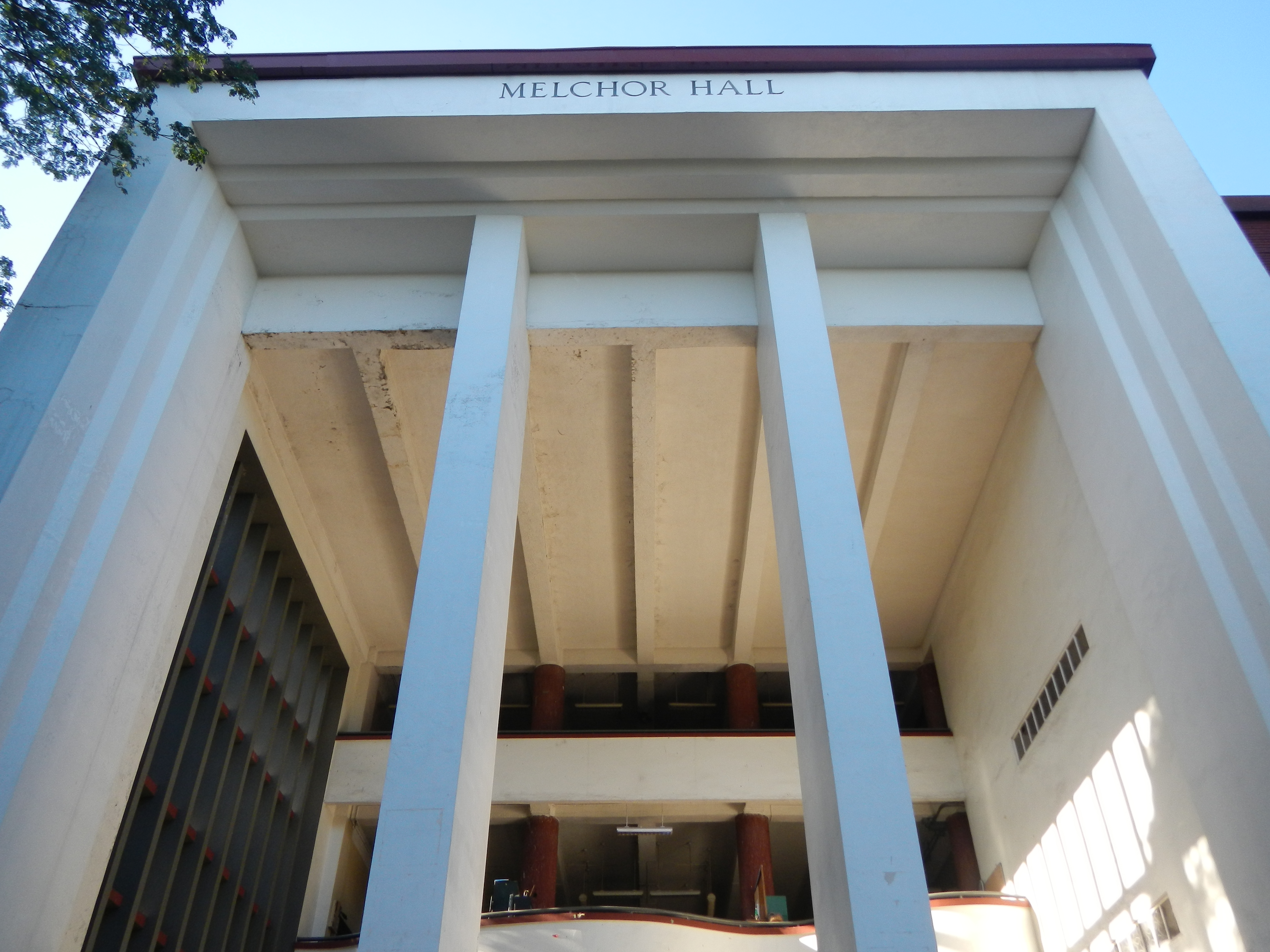
Facade of the UP College of Engineering's Melchor Hall

Commemorative plaque in the UP College of Engineering's Melchor Hall

Alejandro Salmero Melchor Sr. (August 9, 1900 – September 5, 1947) was a Filipino civil engineer, mathematician, educator and member of the Cabinet of the Philippines. A native of Ibajay, Aklan, Melchor was also known for his work on pontoon bridges during the Second World War.

The historic Melchor Hall in the University of the Philippines Diliman campus is named after him. The hall houses most of the units of the UP College of Engineering. A building in the Philippine Military Academy, as well as a street in Ibajay, were also named in his honor.

== Education ==
In 1924, Melchor graduated in civil engineering with the highest honors from the University of the Philippines. By then, the College of Engineering was barely fifteen years old and was still located in the Manila campus.

== Career ==
During the term of Edward R. Hyde as dean of the UP College of Engineering (from 1926 to 1940), Alejandro Melchor served as the College Secretary. Prior to this position, Melchor was a regular member of the engineering faculty. Considered a brilliant mathematician in his time, Melchor also became the head of the mathematics department of the Philippine Military Academy.

Melchor was known for designing the pontoon bridges used by the U.S. Army during the Second World War. According to , Melchor's work "contributed significantly in winning the war for the Allied Forces". Melchor also attained the rank of colonel.

Melchor served in the war cabinet of President Sergio Osmeña as military adviser. This was during the Second World War, when the Philippine government was in exile.

He died on September 5, 1947.
