= Gaston Z. Ortigas =

Filipino educator and entrepreneur (1931–1990)

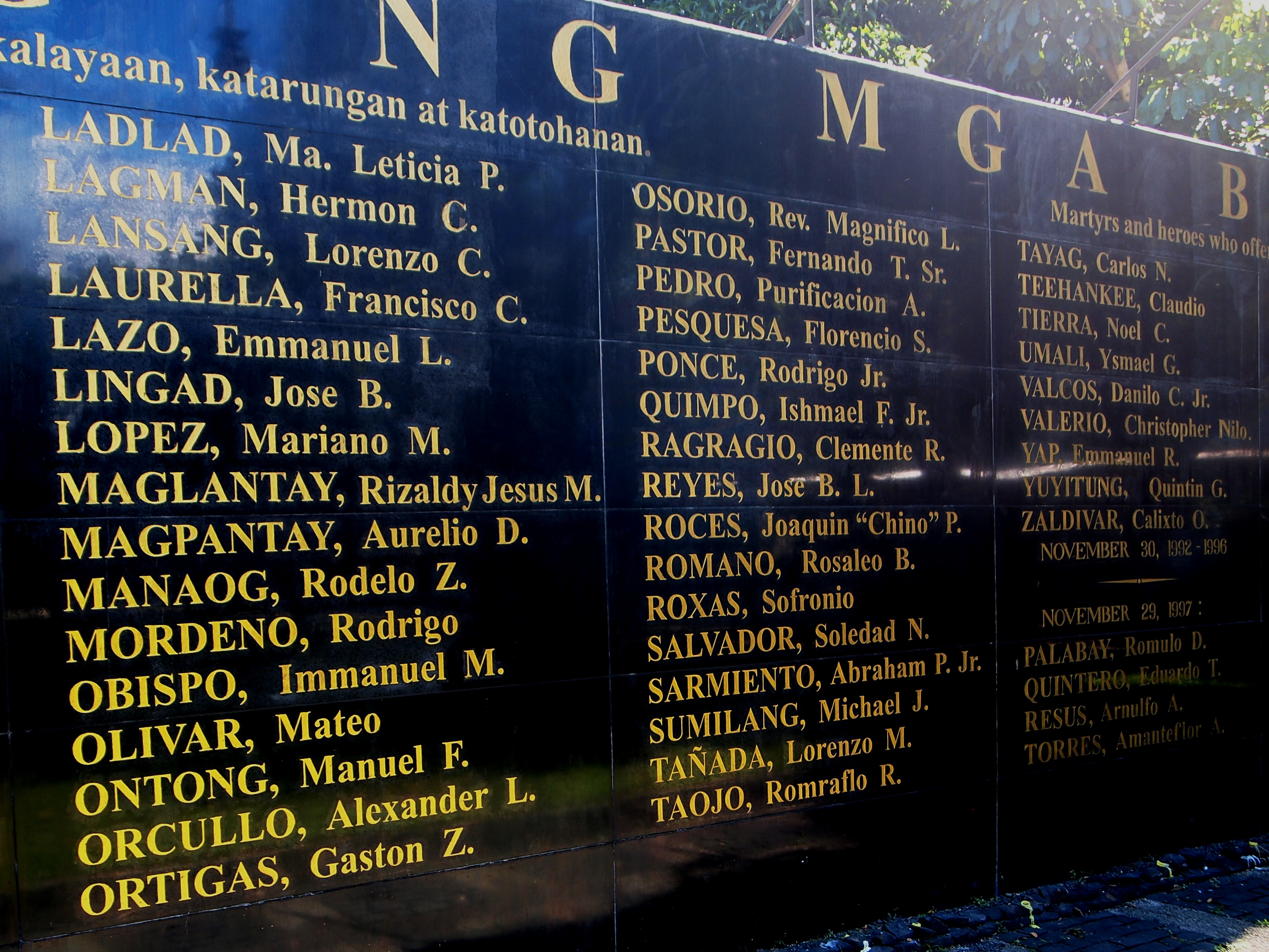
- Detail of the Wall of Remembrance at the Bantayog ng mga Bayani, showing names from the first batch of Bantayog Honorees, including that of Gaston Z. Ortigas
- Born: Gaston Zavalla Ortigas; January 31, 1931
- Disappeared: August 31, 1990 (aged 59)
- Occupations: Educator, Businessman
- Awards: Honored at the Bantayog ng mga Bayani wall of remembrance

Gaston Zavalla Ortigas (January 31, 1931 – August 31, 1990), also known as Gasty was a Filipino professor, freedom fighter, agrarian reformer, entrepreneur, and peace advocate best known for his opposition to the Martial Law dictatorship of Ferdinand Marcos, and for his later pursuit of a peace process between the post-dictatorship Philippine Government and various antidictatorship movements that did not give up their arms after Marcos was deposed in February 1986. He was the dean of the Asian Institute of Management (AIM).

He played a key role in the formation of civil society movements for peace, as one of the original convenors of the Coalition for Peace, and was deeply involved in both the National Peace Conference and what would later become the Multi-Sectoral Peace Advocates (MSPA).

== Biography ==
Prior to the declaration of Martial Law, Ortigas taught as a member of the faculty at the Asian Institute of Management (AIM), specializing in industrial and production management. In 1970 he joined the Christian Social Movement organized by Senator Raul Manglapus.

After the declaration of Martial Law, Ortigas joined various organizations which were critical of Marcos's authoritarian regime, such as the Bishops-Businessmen's Conference and Movement for a Free Philippines (MFP), which was also led by Manglapus. Eventually he had to flee the country to avoid falling into the hands of Marcos' armed forces.

After the 1986 People Power Revolution, Ortigas returned to the Philippines and became an agrarian reform and peace process advocate. He also served as dean at the AIM for the four years between his return to the country and his eventual death.

He died of a lingering illness on August 31, 1990.

== Legacy ==
In his honor, the Ateneo de Manila University established the Gaston Z. Ortigas Peace Institute six months after his death. His name was also inscribed on the Wall of the Remembrance at the Philippines' Bantayog ng mga Bayani (Monument of Heroes), which honors the martyrs and heroes who fought the dictatorship.

== See also ==
- Bantayog ng mga Bayani
- Raul Manglapus
