= Political positions of Kiko Pangilinan =

Political positions of Senator Kiko Pangilinan

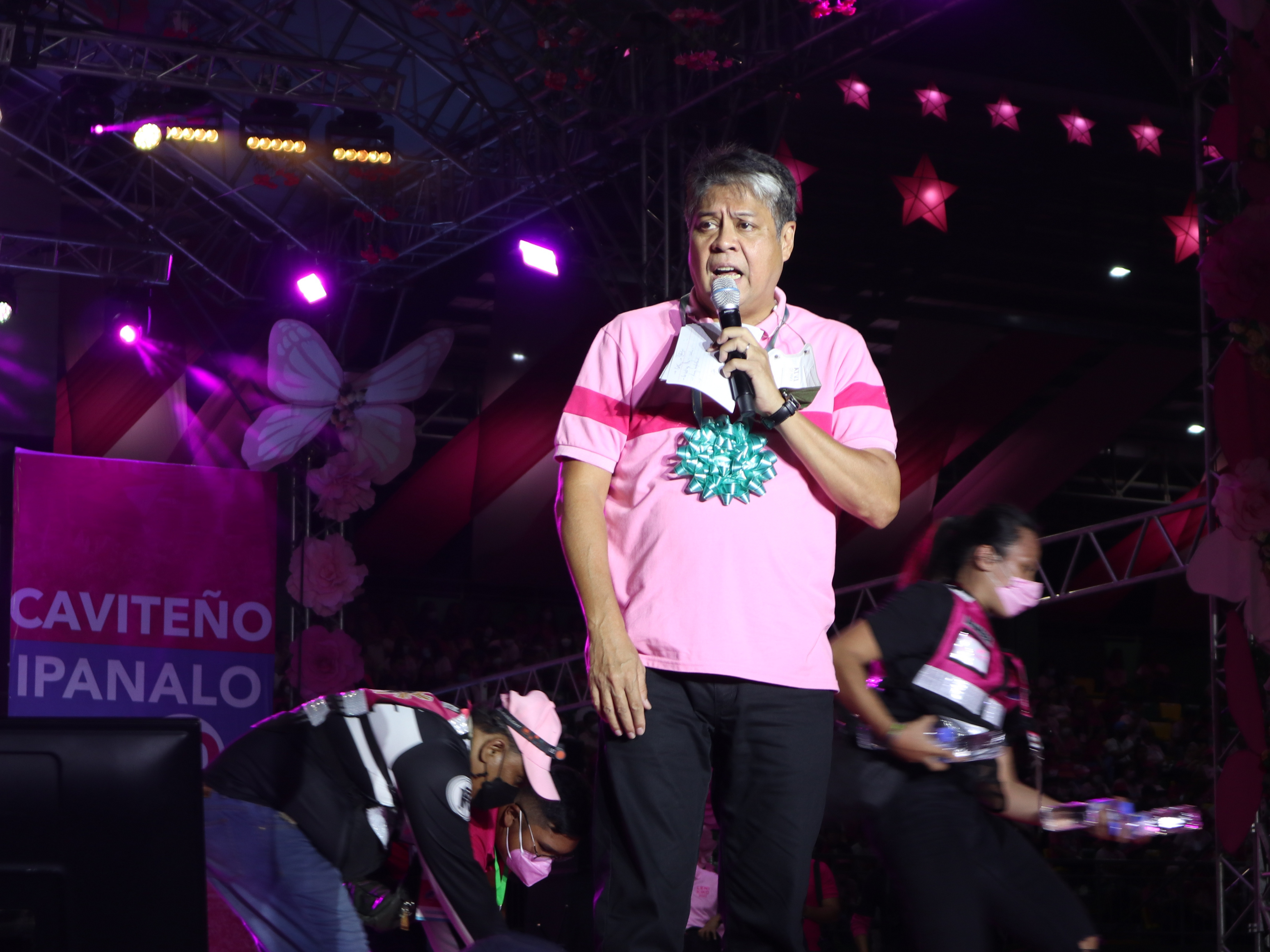
Pangilinan speaks at a campaign rally in Dasmariñas, Cavite, in 2022

Francis "Kiko" Pangilinan is a senator of the Philippines and a member of the Liberal Party. He previously served as a senator from 2001 to 2013 and again from 2016 to 2022, during which he held the position of Senate majority floor leader from 2004 to 2008. Pangilinan also served as Presidential Assistant for Food Security and Agricultural Modernization under President Benigno Aquino III from 2014 to 2015 and began his political career as a Quezon City councilor from 1988 to 1992.

He has been described as liberal and generally centrist in orientation, frequently cited as a prominent opposition and reformist leader in Philippine politics. Throughout his Senate career, Pangilinan has emphasized good governance, agricultural modernization, human rights protection, educational reform, and sustainable economic development. In the Senate, he has championed legislation aimed at strengthening agriculture and food security, advocating for increased support for farmers and fisherfolk and promoting sustainable farming practices. He supports policies aimed at reducing poverty and improving labor conditions, particularly through raising wages and enhancing job security for government and healthcare workers.

Pangilinan strongly advocates for transparency and accountability in governance, opposing corruption and promoting human rights. He has been vocal in condemning extrajudicial killings, political repression, and the erosion of democratic institutions, particularly during the administration of President Rodrigo Duterte. Additionally, Pangilinan supports reproductive rights, civil unions for same-sex couples, and enhanced protection for overseas Filipino workers.

In foreign policy and national security, Pangilinan promotes asserting Philippine sovereignty, particularly in the West Philippine Sea, and has expressed concerns over unregulated mining and its impact on the environment and food security. He has also been an advocate for stronger measures against online disinformation and cyberlibel, emphasizing the need for accountability from tech platforms.

During the COVID-19 pandemic, Pangilinan advocated for robust public health measures, transparency, and accountability in government spending, highlighting concerns over corruption and vaccine procurement processes.

== COVID-19 response ==
Pangilinan supported strong public health measures and transparency in pandemic response. He co-authored the COVID-19 Vaccination Program Act of 2021 (RA No. 11525) and advocated for accessible testing, particularly for returning overseas workers. He was also the only senator who voted against the Bayanihan to Recover as One Act (Bayanihan 2), citing unresolved allegations of corruption in the use of COVID-19 funds and criticizing what he described as the "mediocre leadership" of Health Secretary Francisco Duque III. Pangilinan expressed concern over the Department of Health's handling of the pandemic, warning that continued mismanagement and lack of accountability would undermine the effectiveness of public health interventions and the responsible use of government resources. In January 2021, Pangilinan urged the government to halt its order of the CoronaVac vaccine, also known as the Sinovac vaccine, citing public concerns over its efficacy and the lack of regulatory approval at the time. He questioned the decision to proceed with purchasing 25 million doses despite lower-than-expected efficacy results from clinical trials and the absence of emergency use authorization from Philippine health authorities, warning that the move could undermine public confidence in the national vaccination program.

== Disinformation and digital rights ==
Pangilinan supports stronger safeguards against online disinformation and cyberlibel. Describing himself and his wife as "constant" victims of fake news, he has called on tech platforms to curb fake news. In 2017, he filed Senate Resolution No. 271 seeking an inquiry into the role of social media companies—particularly Facebook—in the spread of fake news, arguing that platforms should be held accountable for enabling the proliferation of false information. "The propagation of fake news stories has become an effective weapon of several political operatives to influence public opinion and national discourse," he said, warning that this disinformation erodes democratic processes. In 2022, as chair of the Senate Committee on Constitutional Amendments and Revision of Codes, he recommended stricter policies to hold social media firms accountable, including identity verification for users, mandatory disclosure of paid content by influencers, and presumed malice for platforms that fail to remove libelous content involving fake accounts.

Pangilinan has also taken legal action against YouTube channels he accused of defamation and cyberlibel. "We must ensure that our online spaces are safe, truthful, and transparent, and that those who use them to harm others face the consequences," he said in 2025. During his 2025 Senate campaign, he expressed support for congressional hearings on fake news and urged the Commission on Elections to coordinate with major platforms like Meta and TikTok to address election-related disinformation. "There must be coordination and cooperation in addressing disinformation, bashing, and trolling online," he said. Pangilinan has emphasized that disinformation not only distorts public discourse but also threatens democratic institutions and undermines accountability.

== Economy ==
Pangilinan believes that the key to lowering inflation lies in addressing high food prices, particularly by managing rice supply and stabilizing rice prices. During his 2025 senatorial campaign, Pangilinan argued that while headline inflation had slowed, the cost of basic necessities—especially food—remained costly for ordinary Filipinos. "When you manage rice inflation, you manage nationwide inflation," he said, emphasizing that government efforts should prioritize making staple goods affordable. He also promoted increased investment in the agriculture sector to reduce food prices and generate employment, calling it "the cheapest and quickest way to increase employment." Pangilinan criticized the government's disproportionate focus on infrastructure spending over food security, stating, "You can't eat cement while our countrymen are starving."

=== Agriculture ===
Pangilinan is a staunch advocate for agriculture and food security, pledging to lower the prices of food and basic commodities. Initially a lawyer and legislator with varied interests, he developed a deep focus on agriculture over time, especially after immersing himself in farming. In 2010, he accepted the chairmanship of the Senate Committee on Agriculture and Food, recognizing that "the biggest challenge for the country had always involved agriculture and food security." Pangilinan later served as the Presidential Assistant for Food Security and Agricultural Modernization from 2014 to 2015.

Pangilinan, a self-proclaimed farmer, has advocated a range of farmer-focused policies: he calls for strengthening cooperatives, providing greater post-harvest support, running an agricultural trade surplus, and going after cartels that manipulate food prices. He has urged local governments to adopt farm-to-table procurement to prevent gluts and wastage – for example, he launched initiatives like "Oplan Sagip Kamatis" transl. "Operation: Save Tomatoes" encouraging municipalities to buy excess tomato harvests, and he pushed for price support mechanisms for agricultural produce. Pangilinan also emphasizes agricultural innovation; he has promoted the use of agricultural technology and encouraged clustering of small farms to achieve economies of scale. His legislative proposals have included bills to increase crop insurance coverage and to establish agro-industrial hubs to support farmers.

Pangilinan supports increasing the incomes of farmers and fisherfolk. He advocates for cluster farming as a strategy to modernize agricultural practices, achieve economies of scale, and improve market access for small-scale producers. "Until and unless we mobilize resources around farming communities and fishing communities and build their capacities, then we will not be able to get the full benefits of land reform," he said during a 2025 forum. Pangilinan has proposed organizing farms into larger, cooperative-based production areas—similar to models in Taiwan and Thailand—and emphasized the need for support services such as credit access, infrastructure, and post-harvest facilities like cold storage. He also called for a gradual increase in the national agriculture budget over six years to enhance food security and reduce rural poverty.

While campaigning for senator in 2025, Pangilinan criticized the Marcos Jr. administration's plan to sell rice at ₱20 (around US$0.35) per kilo nationwide, calling it unsustainable without sufficient support for farmers to increase their yield. He described the initiative as a stop-gap measure that fails to address the root causes of high rice prices, such as low agricultural productivity and inadequate government assistance to rice farmers. While he welcomed efforts to lower rice prices, he argued that a ₱20 per kilo target may not be viable in the long term and emphasized the need for structural reforms, including direct government procurement from farmers and action against traders engaged in price manipulation and economic sabotage.

== Education ==
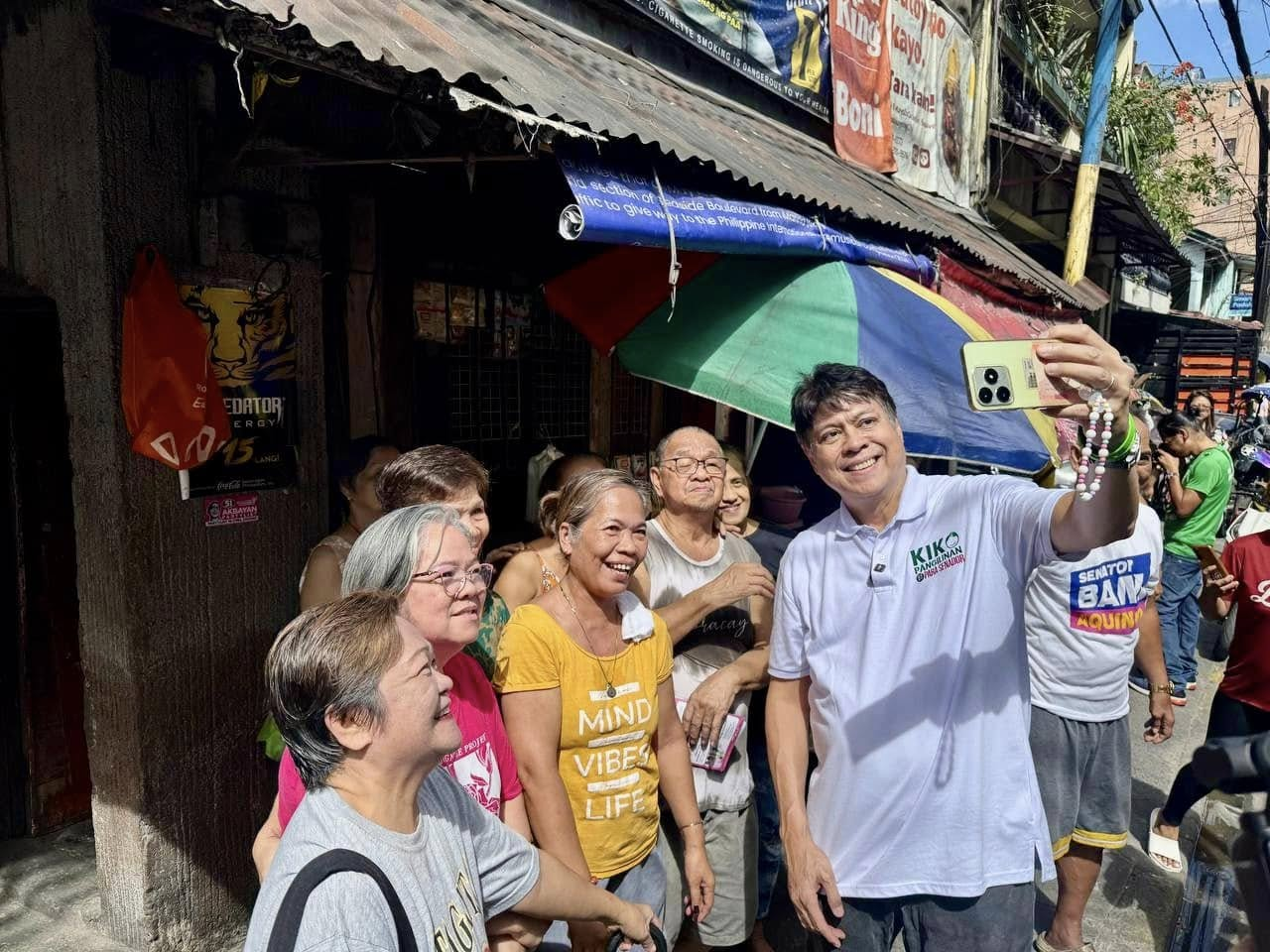
Pangilinan canvasses in Mandaluyong during his 2025 senatorial campaign

Pangilinan supports expanding access to education. In 2017, he co-authored the Universal Access to Quality Tertiary Education Act that made tuition free in state and local universities and colleges. In 2022, he filed the "Bawat Pamilya May College Gradweyt" (transl. "Every Family [Will] Have a College Graduate") bill (Senate Bill 2495) to further expand college access. The measure seeks to ensure at least one member of every poor or low-income Filipino family can earn a college degree, by providing full state funding for tuition and school fees along with allowances for eligible students. Pangilinan argued that prioritizing first-generation college students in impoverished households would help lift families out of poverty and fulfill the state's duty to make quality education accessible.

Pangilinan also supports increasing budgetary allocation for education, particularly to provide more funding for teachers, to reduce teachers' administrative workload, and to implement free school meal programs. In 2025, while running for senator, he unveiled a "Libreng Almusal" (lit. transl. "Free Breakfast") initiative, citing studies that schools with meal programs have significantly lower dropout rates (by nearly 30%) and improved test scores, demonstrating a "direct relationship" between reducing child hunger and improving education quality. Pangilinan advocates inter-agency feeding schemes involving local governments and social welfare departments to ensure that no student goes to class hungry.

== Environment ==
Pangilinan supports sustainable development and opposes irresponsible mining. In 2011, as chair of the Senate Committee on Agriculture and Food, he warned that "irresponsible mining is a grave threat to our efforts in attaining food security," citing testimonies linking unregulated mining to environmental degradation and reduced agricultural productivity. He called for stronger regulation, an inventory of vulnerable farming and fishing communities, and a reassessment of the mining industry's impact on the country's food systems. During his 2022 vice-presidential campaign, Pangilinan reiterated his position by opposing black sand mining along the Zambales coastline, calling for a clear and community-supported regulatory process. "If our nature is being destroyed, agriculture will take the hit," he said, warning that environmental destruction from black sand extraction posed serious risks to agriculture, coastal erosion, and flooding. He has authored the National Land Use Act of 2019 and the Alternative Minerals Management Bill, and has called for stricter monitoring of black sand mining, especially in disaster-prone areas.

== Foreign and security policy ==
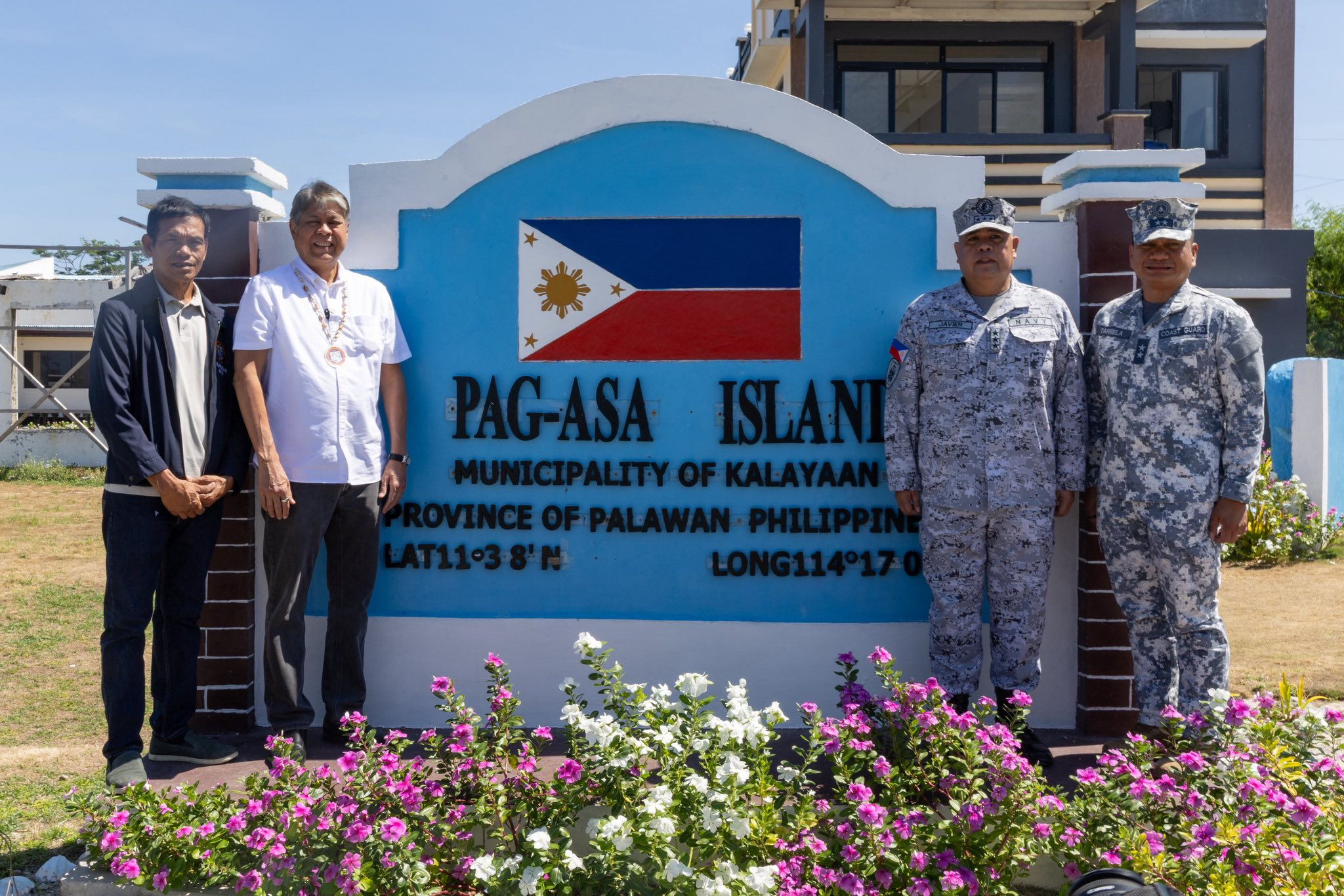
Pangilinan (second from left) visit to the Thitu (Pag-asa) Island, Kalayaan in May 2026

Pangilinan supports asserting Philippine sovereignty in the West Philippine Sea (the portion of the South China Sea within the exclusive economic zone of the Philippines) and opposes foreign encroachment. Pangilinan urged the Philippine government to assert the 2016 Permanent Court of Arbitration (PCA) ruling that affirmed the country's maritime rights, and he criticized the Rodrigo Duterte administration's pivot towards China. For instance, in early 2020 when President Duterte moved to terminate the Philippines' Visiting Forces Agreement (VFA) with the United States, Pangilinan warned that such a step could leave the country vulnerable to Chinese aggression. He noted that given ongoing territorial disputes in the West Philippine Sea, scrapping the defense pact with the U.S. "favors China" and undermines the Philippines' security interests. Pangilinan joined several senators in decrying the VFA's cancellation as a rash decision that was "subservient to China's" agenda, arguing that the U.S. alliance had been a crucial deterrent against external threats.

Pangilinan backed the Enhanced Defense Cooperation Agreement (EDCA) and called for joint maritime patrols with allies to ensure freedom of navigation. However, he has scrutinized the modernization of the Armed Forces of the Philippines (AFP), raising concerns in 2010 over the Arroyo administration's last-minute procurement plans. He questioned the proposed ₱300 billion (around US$6.7 billion) purchase of refurbished or surplus military equipment from several foreign countries, warning that rushed deals in the final months of the administration could lead to anomalous contracts and compromise the safety of military personnel. Pangilinan also criticized the proposed realignment of AFP funds toward intelligence and social integration programs, which he noted were subject to less stringent oversight. When Filipino fishermen were harassed or when a Philippine vessel was sunk by a Chinese boat (as in the 2019 Reed Bank incident), Pangilinan demanded justice and government action, stressing that the country must not "forsake our fishermen."

== Governance and political reform ==
Pangilinan has consistently advocated for good governance and political reforms. During the controversial 2004 presidential election canvassing, he served on the National Board of Canvassers. As the Senate majority leader at the time, he became known by the moniker "Mr. Noted" for repeatedly responding "noted" to opposition requests to scrutinize election returns that were alleged to contain fraud. Years later, Pangilinan publicly acknowledged concerns about the 2004 electoral fraud allegations – a stance for which critics chided him as belated. In the ensuing years, Pangilinan’s alignment shifted firmly toward reformist positions. In 2005, he joined calls for accountability amid the "Hello Garci" scandal implicating President Gloria Macapagal Arroyo, and he broke with pro-administration factions of his Liberal Party, underscoring his commitment to electoral integrity and anti-corruption measures (as also reflected in his later criticism of the 2004 canvassing).

Throughout the Rodrigo Duterte administration (2016–2022), as LP president, Pangilinan decried abuses of power and erosion of checks and balances, and he joined the Senate minority bloc in resisting moves seen as undermining democratic institutions – such as President Duterte's attempts to overhaul the 1987 Constitution and extend term limits. Pangilinan has expressed skepticism toward charter change and federalism, suggesting they could be politically motivated and potentially harmful. He argued that such proposals failed to address the urgent concerns of the public during his Senate tenure, including the "higher prices of goods, lower value of their earnings, traffic, and the continuing violence in the streets." As chair of the Senate Committee on Constitutional Amendments and Revision of Codes during the 18th Congress, Pangilinan stated that he was open to charter change in principle, acknowledging the Constitution's imperfections, but emphasized the need for caution, transparency, and relevance to public interest—particularly questioning the timing and intent of proposals during the COVID-19 pandemic. He also questioned whether charter change was necessary to address the country's health and economic crises.

During a Senate public hearing in 2018 on proposals to shift to a federal form of government, Pangilinan questioned the fiscal feasibility of federalism. Citing research from the Philippine Institute for Development Studies, he said, "About ₱55 billion (US$1.04 billion) is needed for salaries of new federal state elected officials... and that amount does not include the cost of new infrastructure." He added, "With ₱55 billion comprising half the tax take from TRAIN 1, what is clear so far is that federalism means more taxes or more borrowings or both." He expressed concern that the Consultative Committee's draft charter, approved by President Duterte, lacked institutional clarity. "Doing so is like careening off the cliff to political and economic limbo. If we wish to avoid political and economic disaster, we should not rush charter change," Pangilinan warned in a statement issued after grilling members of the committee during the Senate hearings.

Pangilinan opposes political dynasties. He authored and sponsored an anti-political dynasty bill in the Senate and co-led hearings on banning political dynasties. The bill sought to bar immediate and second-degree relatives from simultaneously holding or succeeding each other in elective office. Pangilinan argued that dynasties undermine democracy and warned that a shift to federalism without anti-dynasty safeguards could only empower local political families further. He was open to pragmatic compromises (such as defining the covered degree of kinship) to get an anti-dynasty law passed. In addition, Pangilinan has supported other good-governance reforms like freedom of information legislation and campaign finance regulations, in line with LP platforms (these measures, however, stalled in the Senate's 16th Congress).

== Human rights and justice ==
Pangilinan has been a vocal defender of human rights and due process, particularly during the Duterte administration's "war on drugs." He was among the opposition senators who condemned the surge of extrajudicial killings of suspected drug offenders. Pangilinan questioned the Duterte government's claims of success in its drug war, pointing to the continued influx of drugs despite thousands of killings and arrests. In a 2020 Senate debate, he challenged a Duterte ally's assertion that the anti-drug campaign was "very effective," citing the unabated smuggling of narcotics: "I don't see any logic in the fact that, despite so many who have been arrested and thousands who have died, drugs continue to proliferate," Pangilinan remarked, expressing skepticism that the campaign could be called successful. He highlighted the contradiction of declaring victory over crime while illegal drugs remained widespread, using this to argue against the reimposition of the death penalty for drug offenses. As Liberal Party (LP) president, he vowed in 2017 to block any bill restoring capital punishment, calling it a cruel and inhuman policy. He instead called for policy alternatives focused on rehabilitation and poverty alleviation. Pangilinan also criticized the House of Representatives for passing the death penalty bill with scant debate, and promised that the Senate minority would ensure it did not pass the upper chamber. Together with like-minded colleagues, Pangilinan succeeded – no death penalty law was approved during the 17th and 18th Congress.

He opposes lowering the minimum age of criminal responsibility. Pangilinan is best known for authoring the Juvenile Justice and Welfare Act of 2006 (Republic Act No. 9344). This law, which he principally sponsored during his first Senate term, set the minimum age of criminal liability at 15 years and introduced restorative justice and intervention programs for youth offenders. When critics (including President Duterte) derisively labeled RA 9344 the "Pangilinan Law" and blamed it for rising juvenile delinquency, Pangilinan refuted these claims and stood by the law's intent. He emphasized that organized syndicates – not the children – should be punished, arguing that criminal gangs exploit minors and that enforcement efforts should target those adults using children to commit crimes. Pangilinan noted that the law had been poorly implemented due to lack of government funding for youth rehabilitation centers, and he insisted on proper implementation rather than repeal. In the late 2010s, as the Duterte administration pushed to lower the age of criminal responsibility (first to 12, and even as low as 9 years old), Pangilinan led opposition to such proposals. He argued it was inhumane and illogical to imprison pre-teens. He dismissed the "tough on crime" rhetoric as a false solution, pointing out that an "iron fist" approach had failed to curtail crime after years in practice.

During President Duterte's term, Pangilinan also urged accountability for security forces. He supported resolutions seeking investigations into extrajudicial killings and backed United Nations efforts to look into the Philippines' human rights situation. In 2017, as LP president, he welcomed reports by witnesses like retired policeman Arturo Lascañas that implicated Duterte in a "death squad" during the latter's mayoralty, saying such evidence corroborated long-standing allegations of state-sponsored killings. Pangilinan argued that these claims – including testimony that police received bounties per kill – should be fully investigated and validated. He consistently maintained that the rule of law must prevail over vigilantism. For instance, in response to thousands of drug-related killings, Pangilinan stated that modernizing the justice system and addressing root causes (such as poverty and drug rehabilitation) would be a more effective solution than violent crackdowns. He joined the Senate minority in calling for reforms in policing and for holding erring officers accountable, rather than condoning shortcuts that led to human rights abuses.

Pangilinan's human rights stance extended to other issues as well. A student activist during the Marcos dictatorship, Pangilinan was one of the senators who objected to Ferdinand Marcos's burial in the Libingan ng mga Bayani (transl. Heroes' Cemetery) in 2016, aligning with victims of martial law in saying it "whitewashed" historical injustices. Pangilinan also opposed Duterte's 2017 declaration of martial law in Mindanao beyond its initial scope, cautioning against abuses (invoking the lessons of Marcos-era martial law). The senator voted against all the yearly extensions of martial law in Mindanao. Additionally, Pangilinan has advocated for press freedom and judicial independence. He criticized the 2020 shutdown of ABS-CBN, the network where he once worked as a television host and where his wife, singer and actress Sharon Cuneta, had been under contract for most of her career. Pangilinan described the company's shutdown as an affront to free expression and a "dangerous precedent." In the impeachment trial of Chief Justice Renato Corona in 2012, Senator Pangilinan voted to convict Corona, who was ultimately removed for undeclared assets – a vote Pangilinan said was for accountability and the rule of law.

Pangilinan has raised concerns over Philippine offshore gaming operators (POGOs) and their impact on crime, corruption, and national security. He supports tighter regulation or outright banning of POGOs if their social costs outweigh economic benefits. In 2020, he opposed proposals to allow POGOs to resume operations during the COVID-19 lockdown, questioning their tax contributions and criticizing the government's prioritization of Chinese workers over unemployed Filipinos. He cited statements from the Department of Finance (DOF) indicating that POGOs were failing to pay billions of pesos in taxes and raised suspicions over the industry's alleged ties to influential figures in the Duterte administration. In a separate statement, Pangilinan called for the "immediate closure" of errant POGO firms amid what he described as an "influx of illegality" linked to the sector. He also demanded the deportation of Chinese nationals involved in criminal activities such as prostitution, bribery, and corruption, citing findings from Senate inquiries that exposed tax evasion, immigration bribery, and sex trafficking involving POGO-linked operations. Pangilinan stressed the need for intensive investigation and regulation of the industry, asserting that national policies should prioritize the welfare and job opportunities of Filipinos over foreign interests.

== Labor rights ==
Pangilinan opposes contractualization and has called for better labor conditions in the country. In 2016, he filed the Civil Service Eligibility Bill during the 17th Congress to grant civil service eligibility to casual and contractual government employees who have rendered at least five years of continuous and efficient service, arguing that they deserved job security and access to social benefits typically afforded to regular employees. In 2019, he filed Senate Bill No. 260, which sought to raise the entry-level salary of government nurses to Salary Grade 15 (₱30,531 per month) in response to widespread low wages and poor working conditions in the health sector. Pangilinan cited the continued migration of Filipino nurses abroad as a major concern, warning that the country's healthcare system was being strained as a result. That same year, he also filed Senate Bill No. 261, which aimed to provide fixed-rate allowances for over 200,000 barangay health workers (BHWs) nationwide. Calling BHWs "front-liners" in the country's healthcare system, Pangilinan emphasized their critical role in delivering basic services in rural and underserved communities. He noted that while existing laws recognize BHWs and entitle them to certain benefits, the lack of a standardized allowance rate had led to underpayment and unequal treatment across barangays. Pangilinan argued that improving the compensation and work conditions of healthcare workers—including nurses and BHWs—was essential to ensuring the delivery of universal and equitable healthcare in the Philippines.

Pangilinan supports increased protection for overseas Filipino workers (OFWs) and domestic workers. In 2021, Pangilinan opposed the increase in passport renewal fees for OFWs and other Filipinos abroad, criticizing the use of private outsourcing companies by Philippine embassies and consulates, which he said imposed additional financial burdens on already struggling migrant workers. He suggested instead that the government consider deploying more personnel to embassies and consulates to improve passport services without raising costs. While campaigning for senator in 2025, he condemned proposals to revoke OFWs' tax privileges in retaliation for political protest, calling such moves "wrong and deeply unjust." He emphasized that OFWs are "the backbone of the economy" and urged the government to approach their concerns with fairness, dialogue, and respect for their right to free expression. During campaign visits in Albay, Pangilinan also called for swift consular action in response to OFW crises in Qatar and Myanmar, including the rescue of 176 trafficked workers. He condemned human trafficking syndicates and advocated for stronger inter-agency enforcement, faster embassy response systems, and reintegration programs for repatriated workers. He further proposed expanded agricultural initiatives to address food insecurity as a root cause of labor migration, stating that the Philippines should be "a country where working abroad is a choice, not a necessity."

== Social policy ==
According to the Philippine Daily Inquirer, Pangilinan supports divorce "only when human dignity of either spouse is compromised."

Pangilinan supports civil unions for same-sex couples. In a 2018 radio interview, he said that while existing laws define family and marriage in specific terms, there should be recognition of same-sex relationships, particularly in matters such as property relations. He added that he preferred to wait for the Supreme Court's ruling on the petition questioning the provisions of the Family Code on marriage.

Pangilinan supports access to sexual and reproductive health, calling it a necessary step to promote maternal health and responsible parenthood. He voted in favor of the Responsible Parenthood and Reproductive Health Act of 2012 (RA No. 10354; "Reproductive Health Law") and opposed attempts to defund its implementation.
