= Kiko Pangilinan =

Filipino politician (born 1963)

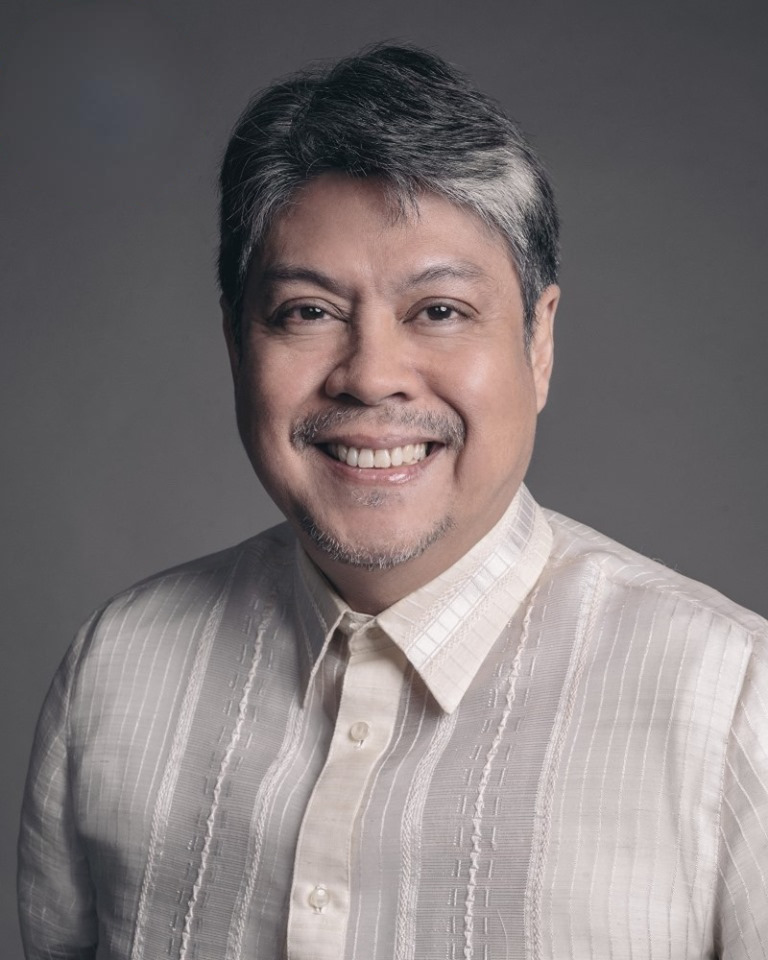
- Official portrait, 2019

Senator of the Philippines
- Incumbent
- Assumed office June 30, 2025
- In office June 30, 2016 – June 30, 2022
- In office June 30, 2001 – June 30, 2013
Committee positions
Chair of the Senate Justice and Human Rights Committee
In office September 10, 2025 – May 26, 2026
Preceded by	Alan Peter Cayetano
Succeeded by	Rodante Marcoleta
Incumbent
Assumed office June 17, 2026
Chair of the Senate Agriculture, Food and Agrarian Reform Committee
In office July 29, 2025 – May 26, 2026
Preceded by	Cynthia Villar
Succeeded by	Rodante Marcoleta
Chair of the Senate Constitutional Amendments and Revision of Codes Committee
Incumbent
Assumed office June 17, 2026
Incumbent
Assumed office August 12, 2025
Preceded by	Robin Padilla
Succeeded by	Robin Padilla
In office 2018 – June 30, 2022
Preceded by	Franklin Drilon
Succeeded by	Robin Padilla
In office July 25, 2016 – February 27, 2017
Preceded by	Cynthia Villar
Succeeded by	Cynthia Villar
In office July 26, 2010 – June 30, 2013
Preceded by	Loren Legarda
Succeeded by	Cynthia Villar
Chair of the Senate Agrarian Reform Committee
In office February 2, 2009 – June 30, 2010
Preceded by	Gregorio Honasan
Succeeded by	Gregorio Honasan

Senate Majority Leader
- In office January 12, 2004 – November 17, 2008
- Preceded by: Loren Legarda
- Succeeded by: Migz Zubiri

Presidential Assistant for Food Security and Agricultural Modernization
- In office May 6, 2014 – September 15, 2015
- President: Benigno Aquino III
- Preceded by: Position established
- Succeeded by: Fredelita Guiza

Member of the Quezon City Council from the 4th district
- In office June 30, 1988 – June 30, 1992
Party positions
Chairperson of the Liberal Party
In office June 30, 2022 – January 24, 2026
Preceded by	Leni Robredo
Succeeded by	Leila de Lima
16th President of the Liberal Party
In office August 8, 2016 – September 30, 2022
Preceded by	Jun Abaya
Succeeded by	Edcel Lagman

Personal details
- Born: Francis Pancratius Nepomuceno Pangilinan; August 24, 1963 (age 63) Manila, Philippines
- Party: Liberal (2001–present)
- Other political affiliations: Independent (1992–2001); LDP (1988–1992)
- Spouse: Sharon Cuneta (m. 1996)
- Relations: KC Concepcion (step-daughter); Anthony Pangilinan (brother); Pablo Cuneta (father-in-law); Helen Gamboa (aunt-in-law); Maricel Laxa (sister-in-law); Gary Valenciano (brother-in-law); Paolo Valenciano (nephew); Gab Valenciano (nephew); Kiana Valenciano (niece); Gab Pangilinan (niece); Donny Pangilinan (nephew); Josh Buizon (nephew); Chito Miranda (nephew)
- Children: 3, including Kakie
- Education: University of the Philippines Diliman (BA, LL.B); Harvard University (MPA)
- Occupation: Politician, entrepreneur, farmer
- Profession: Lawyer
- Website: Official website

Francis Pancratius "Kiko" Nepomuceno Pangilinan ([paŋɪˈlinan]; born August 24, 1963) is a Filipino politician, lawyer, and farmer who has served as a senator of the Philippines since 2025. He previously served as a senator from 2001 to 2013 and from 2016 to 2022.

A graduate of the University of the Philippines College of Law and the Harvard Kennedy School, Pangilinan began his political career as the youngest elected member of the Quezon City Council, serving from 1988 to 1992, and later founded the National Movement of Young Legislators. He then worked as a television and radio host for ABS-CBN, notably co-hosting the public service program Hoy Gising! (1993–1997) as a legal expert.

During his first two Senate terms, Pangilinan authored landmark legislation such as a juvenile justice law that has since been called the "Pangilinan Law" and an organic farming protection law. After serving as Presidential Assistant for Food Security and Agricultural Modernization under President Benigno Aquino III from 2014 to 2015, he returned to the Senate for a third term in 2016. Throughout his career, Pangilinan has strongly advocated for agriculture and food security, authoring the Organic Agriculture Act of 2010 and the Sagip Saka Act (transl. Save the Farm Act) of 2019, both aimed at supporting small-scale farmers and modernizing agricultural productivity.

Pangilinan served as president of the Liberal Party during his third Senate term from 2016 to 2022, emerging as a prominent opposition figure during the administration of President Rodrigo Duterte. He consistently criticized policies he viewed as undermining democratic institutions, including the war on drugs, attempts to reinstate the death penalty, and proposals for constitutional amendments that could extend term limits.

In the 2022 national elections, Pangilinan ran for vice president as the running mate of Vice President Leni Robredo. He was defeated by Sara Duterte, the daughter of Rodrigo Duterte. He returned to media briefly in 2024, hosting public affairs programs focusing on agriculture and grassroots issues. Pangilinan was re-elected to the Senate in the 2025 elections, emphasizing food security and farmers' welfare in his campaign.

He is married to actress and singer Sharon Cuneta, with whom he runs an organic family farm in Cavite.

== Early life and education ==
Francis Pancratius Nepomuceno Pangilinan was born on August 24, 1963, to Donato Tongol Pangilinan Jr., an engineer and entrepreneur from Pampanga, and Emma Monasterial Nepomuceno, a public school teacher from Nueva Ecija and Marinduque. He has eight siblings.

Pangilinan completed his primary and secondary education at La Salle Green Hills in 1977 and 1981, respectively. During school breaks, his father regularly assigned him and his siblings tasks in their family businesses. At their Manila Pearl furniture factory, Pangilinan worked as a timekeeper as a child and became a project coordinator by age 19. He later earned a Bachelor of Arts in English, majoring in Comparative Literature, from the University of the Philippines Diliman, where he was also a varsity athlete on the UP Men's Volleyball Team.

As a freshman law student at the University of the Philippines College of Law, Pangilinan was elected chairperson of the UP Diliman University Student Council in 1986 and served as student regent on the UP Board of Regents in 1987. He was a member of Upsilon Sigma Phi. He subsequently earned his Bachelor of Laws degree from the UP College of Law.

Throughout his time at UP Diliman, Pangilinan was active in the Sandigan para sa Mag-Aaral at Sambayanan (SAMASA; transl. Support for Students and the People), a student political party prominent in the anti‐Marcos movement of that era. He attended and spoke at the funeral of assassinated labor leader Rolando Olalia in November 1986, issuing the statement: "Ka Lando, sa atin ang kinabukasan" (lit. 'Ka Lando, the future is ours').

In 1997, Pangilinan moved to Massachusetts, United States, to pursue a Master of Public Administration at Harvard Kennedy School, where he graduated with a general average of A–.

== Early political career ==
In 1988, while a law student, Pangilinan ran successfully for the Quezon City Council, representing the 4th district. At age 24, he became the youngest person ever elected to that council. He served a single term (1988–1992), during which he was chosen to serve as Minority Leader of the council in 1991–1992. Among the ordinances that Pangilinan filed was Ordinance NC-36, S-88 in 1988, which created contractual staff positions for council offices. In 1991–1992, he also helped found and became the first national president of the National Movement of Young Legislators (NMYL), a federation of local youth legislators. Pangilinan was awarded the "Most Outstanding Councilor" award by the Quezon City Press Association in both 1989 and 1990.

Pangilinan ran for representative of Quezon City's 4th congressional district in the 1992 elections, but lost to Feliciano Belmonte Jr. (who later became the 18th speaker of the House of Representatives).

== Senate (2001–2013) ==
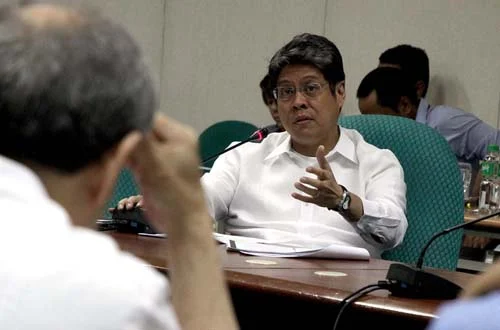
Pangilinan during a Senate hearing, December 4, 2012.

Pangilinan was elected to the Senate in 2001, placing eighth (out of 12 winning candidates) with 10,971,896 votes, and was re-elected in 2007, placing fifth with 14,534,678 votes. In the 2001 election, he ran under the People Power Coalition of President Gloria Macapagal Arroyo.

Pangilinan chaired the Committee on Justice and Human Rights, and among his first legislative actions as senator was leading the committee in the creation of the Anti-Money Laundering Act, which establishes the Anti-Money Laundering Council (AMLC); it was passed by Congress and signed into law as Republic Act No. 9160 on September 29, 2001. In 2002, he and then-National Youth Commission chair Bam Aquino co-founded the Ten Accomplished Youth Organizations (TAYO) Awards, an annual national program recognizing outstanding youth groups across the country.

He was first elected Senate Majority Leader in 2004 during the 13th Congress and was re-elected to the position on July 23, 2007, following the election of Manny Villar as Senate President and Jinggoy Estrada as Senate President Pro Tempore at the opening of the 14th Congress.

Pangilinan was the principal author of the Juvenile Justice and Welfare Act of 2006 (Republic Act No. 9344), which established a separate justice system for minors. The law set the minimum age of criminal responsibility at 15 years and created the Juvenile Justice and Welfare Council under the Department of Justice (DOJ) to rehabilitate youth offenders instead of imprisoning them. This reform has often been nicknamed the "Pangilinan Law". In later years, some officials (including President Rodrigo Duterte) criticized the law and blamed it for perceived rises in juvenile delinquency. Pangilinan defended the measure, arguing that its poor implementation (such as the lack of funding for youth rehabilitation centers) was the issue, and urging authorities to target adult criminal syndicates who exploit children rather than jailing the minors themselves.

In 2008, Pangilinan created the Judicial Executive Legislative Advisory and Consultative Council (JELACC), a body first proposed during the Manila Hotel summit on extrajudicial killings and enforced disappearances held on July 16–17, 2007.

On November 17, 2008, Pangilinan resigned as Senate Majority Leader amid a leadership reorganization in the chamber. This change was precipitated by Villar's resignation as Senate President in the face of an imminent no-confidence vote. Senators Juan Ponce Enrile and Migz Zubiri were subsequently elected Senate President and Senate Majority Leader, respectively.

In 2010, he chaired the Senate Committee on Agriculture, during which he authored the Organic Agriculture Act of 2010. The law aimed to promote the development of organic agricultural practices and protect indigenous organic farmers in the Philippines.

Pangilinan voted against Senate Bill No. 2796, which later became the Cybercrime Prevention Act of 2012 (RA No. 10175). He was one of only two senators—alongside TG Guingona—who opposed the measure.

He voted in favor of Senate Bill No. 2865, which later became the Responsible Parenthood and Reproductive Health Act of 2012 (RA No. 10354; "Reproductive Health Law"). He stated that sexual and reproductive health was a necessary step to promote maternal health and responsible parenthood.

== Aquino cabinet (2014–2015) ==
In May 2014, President Benigno Aquino III appointed Pangilinan as Presidential Assistant for Food Security and Agricultural Modernization (PAFSAM), a newly-created cabinet-level position under the Office of the President. As PAFSAM, Pangilinan was tasked to improve farm sector agencies. He took charge of the National Food Authority (NFA), the National Irrigation Administration (NIA), the Philippine Coconut Authority (PCA), and the Fertilizer and Pesticide Authority (FPA) to address rice supply, irrigation, and coconut farmer issues.

During his tenure, Pangilinan advocated for the establishment of a coco levy trust fund to benefit coconut farmers, seeking to address the long-standing issues stemming from the Coco Levy Fund scam. The scam involved the collection of levies from coconut farmers during the administration of President Ferdinand Marcos, allegedly for industry development, but the funds were misused by Marcos and his cronies.

In September 2015, Pangilinan resigned from the position to run for senator in the 2016 elections.

== Senate (2016–2022) ==
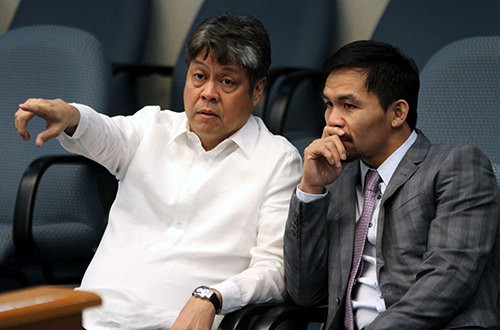
Senators Kiko Pangilinan and Manny Pacquiao in 2016.

Pangilinan won a third term in the Senate in the 2016 elections, placing eighth overall with 15,955,949 votes. He ran under the Koalisyon ng Daang Matuwid of presidential candidate Mar Roxas.

In October 2016, he was appointed interim president of the Liberal Party, succeeding former Transportation and Communications Secretary Joseph Emilio Abaya. His appointment was made permanent in August 2017.

Originally part of the Senate majority of the 17th Congress, Pangilinan joined the minority bloc on February 27, 2017, alongside Senators Bam Aquino, Leila de Lima, Franklin Drilon, Risa Hontiveros, and Antonio Trillanes.

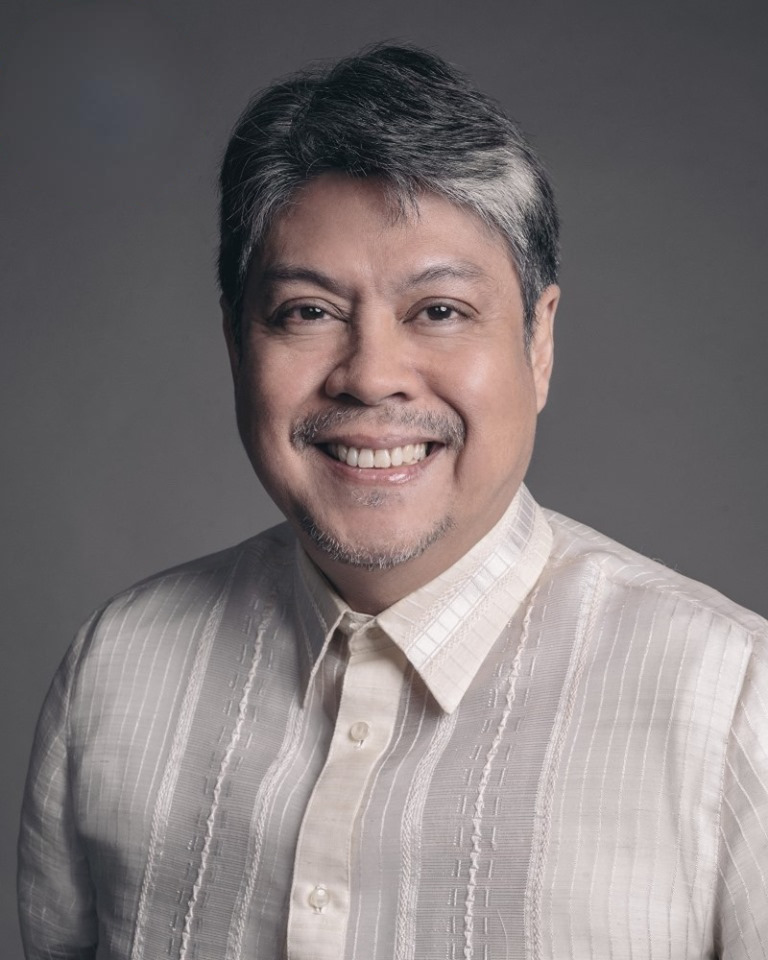
Official portrait, 2019

Pangilinan was among the co-authors of the Universal Access to Quality Tertiary Education Act (Republic Act No. 10931), which made tuition and other mandatory fees free for students in state universities, colleges, and technical-vocational institutions. This landmark law, championed primarily by Senator Bam Aquino, was co-sponsored by Pangilinan along with many of his colleagues across party lines. After initial concerns about its budgetary impact were overcome, President Rodrigo Duterte signed RA No. 10931 into law in August 2017. Pangilinan, along with other sponsors, emphasized that the law was in line with the constitutional mandate to make education accessible to all.

Pangilinan co-authored the Free Internet Access in Public Places Act, signed into law by President Duterte as RA No. 10929 in August 2017. The law mandates the establishment of free Wi-Fi hotspots in parks, schools, libraries, transportation hubs, and other public spaces. According to Pangilinan, the law aims to modernize infrastructure and bridge the digital divide, especially for students and rural communities.

He authored the Sagip Saka Act (transl. Save the Farm Act; RA No. 11321) in 2019, a law aimed at improving farmers' incomes and modernizing agriculture. The Sagip Saka Act institutionalizes direct purchase programs by government agencies and local government units from accredited agricultural and fishery cooperatives, thus bypassing middlemen and the traditional bidding process. The law also provides tax incentives for donors of farm equipment and infrastructure.

In February 2019, he abstained during the passage of the Rice Tariffication Law (RA No. 11203) due to concerns about its impact on farmers and later defended that decision. (Note: The Rice Tariffication Law (Republic Act No. 11203), signed on February 14, 2019, replaced quantitative restrictions on rice imports with a tariff-based system and established the Rice Competitiveness Enhancement Fund (RCEF), providing ₱10 billion (around US$177 million) annually to support farmers with machinery, certified seeds, credit, and training. The law also repealed the National Food Authority's (NFA's) authority to monitor, regulate, and intervene in the rice market. This included removing its power over licensing, inspection, warehouse regulation, and control over supply and pricing mechanisms. Lawmakers argue that this loss of regulatory power allowed traders to manipulate rice supply and prices through hoarding and other practices, limiting the NFA's role to maintaining emergency buffer stocks.) He stated he "had reservations precisely in supporting the measure", subsequently filing amendments to ensure tariff revenues funded direct cash assistance to rice farmers. Pangilinan welcomed proposals from the Department of Agriculture to increase rice import tariffs and urged that tariff collections must reach and directly benefit farmers, warning that the law had not delivered intended support.

As part of his social legislation advocacy in the Senate, Pangilinan co-authored the Student Fare Discount Act of 2019 (RA No. 11314). This law institutionalized a 20% fare discount for students on all forms of public transportation throughout the year. The measure guaranteed the existing student fare privilege by law and extended it to include weekends and semester breaks. Pangilinan, along with the bill's principal sponsors, Senators Sonny Angara and Bam Aquino, pushed for the passage of this relief for students amid rising transportation costs.

Pangilinan also co-authored the Expanded Maternity Leave Act, which became law in 2019 (RA No. 11210). This law significantly increased the paid maternity leave for working women in the Philippines from the previous 60 days to 105 days for those with normal deliveries (and from 78 days to 105 days for cesarean deliveries). It also provided options for an additional 30 days of unpaid leave and allocated an additional 15 days of leave for solo mothers. Pangilinan joined a bipartisan group of senators in advocating for this policy, aiming to improve maternal and child health and align the country's labor standards with international norms. He was listed as one of the authors of the Senate bill that led to the law's enactment.

In May 2019, following the failure of the Otso Diretso slate—of which he was campaign manager—to win any seats in the 2019 senatorial election, Pangilinan announced his resignation as party president. However, his resignation was rejected by party chairperson and Vice President Leni Robredo.

In July 2019, following the start of the 18th Congress, Pangilinan filed Senate Bill No. 264 to define and ban political dynasties in public office. As chair of the Senate Committee on Constitutional Amendments and Revision of Codes during the 17th Congress, he used his platform to push for this long-stalled reform. Pangilinan publicly challenged President Rodrigo Duterte in 2020 to certify the anti-dynasty bill as urgent, arguing that such a law is necessary to dismantle oligarchic political structures and ensure equal opportunity in governance. However, like previous attempts by other legislators, Pangilinan's anti-dynasty initiative made little progress in Congress and "hardly moved" in committee deliberations.

Pangilinan played an active role in the legislation addressing the decades-old coconut levy issue. He was a key proponent of what eventually became the Coconut Farmers and Industry Trust Fund Act of 2021 (RA No. 11524). This law created a trust fund (initially capitalized at around ₱105 billion or US$2.18 billion) for the benefit of an estimated 3.5 million coconut farmers and their families, using assets accrued from the 1970s coconut levy. Pangilinan had been working on the coco levy issue in the Senate for years—he sponsored a coco levy trust fund bill in the previous Congress that sought to implement a 2012 Supreme Court decision returning the levy to farmers. During debates on the 2021 measure, Pangilinan consistently pushed for provisions to ensure that smallholder farmers would benefit. He argued that "farmer representation is the heart of the coco levy trust fund measure", insisting that coconut farmers themselves should have a strong voice in the fund's management committee. He also advocated defining a "small coconut farmer" as one owning not more than five hectares of land, to focus the law's benefits on poor and marginal farmers. The initial version of the bill containing these pro-farmer provisions was vetoed by President Duterte in 2019 over concerns about management and safeguards. Pangilinan worked with colleagues to revise the bill, and the refined measure was eventually enacted in February 2021.

During the COVID-19 pandemic-related community quarantines, Pangilinan urged the government to shoulder the cost of COVID-19 testing kits for inbound travelers, particularly overseas Filipino workers. In 2021, Pangilinan co-authored the COVID-19 Vaccination Program Act (RA No. 11525), which aimed to expedite the procurement and distribution of vaccines nationwide.

== 2022 vice presidential campaign ==
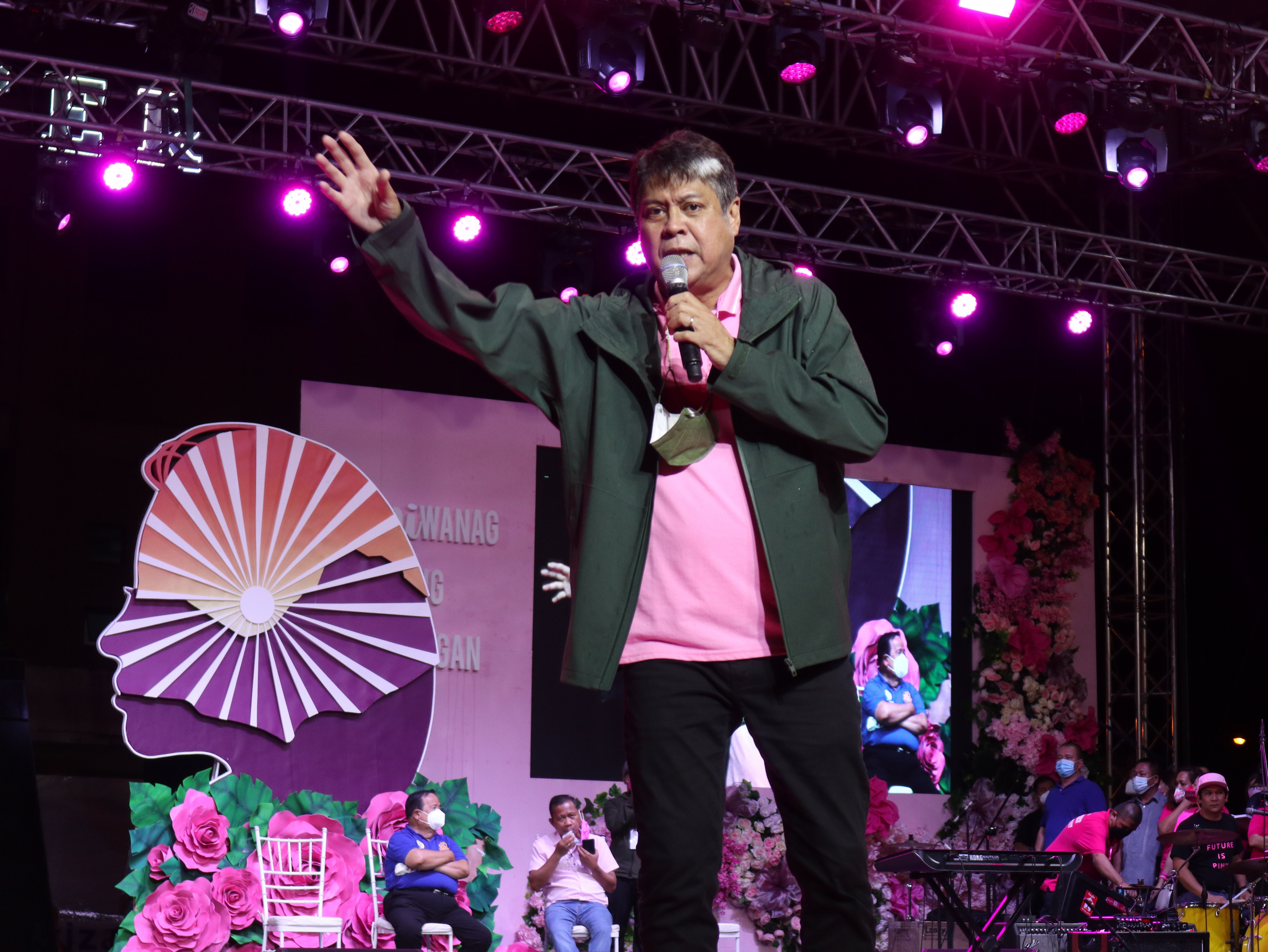
Pangilinan campaigning for vice president in Antipolo, April 5, 2022.

On October 8, 2021, Pangilinan filed his certificate of candidacy for vice president in the 2022 Philippine presidential election, running as the Liberal Party's candidate alongside presidential aspirant Leni Robredo. Unlike Pangilinan, Robredo ran as an independent, although she remained party chair. Pangilinan had initially intended to seek reelection as senator before being selected as Robredo's running mate.

One of Pangilinan's opponents in the vice-presidential race was Senate President Tito Sotto, his uncle by marriage (the husband of his aunt-in-law Helen Gamboa), who ran alongside Senator Panfilo Lacson. Pangilinan later acknowledged that the situation was emotionally difficult for his family.

His campaign slogan was "Goodbye Gutom, Hello Pagkain" (lit. transl. "Goodbye Hunger, Hello Food"), reflecting his platform centered on the agricultural sector, with a focus on food security and support for farmers and fisherfolk. He joined Robredo's call for an "exhaustive review" of the Rice Tariffication Law (RA No. 11203), arguing that while opening markets could be beneficial, farmers needed sufficient preparation and support to compete.

Pangilinan placed second in the official vice-presidential tally, receiving 9,329,207 votes, losing to Davao City Mayor Sara Duterte by a wide margin of over 22 million votes.

== Senate (from 2025) ==
=== Election ===
In September 2024, the Liberal Party announced that Pangilinan would run for senator in the 2025 election under their banner. On October 8, 2024, he filed his certificate of candidacy. He ran alongside former senator Bam Aquino, collectively known as the "KiBam" coalition, with whom he had previously collaborated to establish the TAYO Awards in 2002.

He ran on a platform focused on food security, vowing to lower the price of rice and other goods. Pangilinan also pledged to push for a price floor for rice and to "fully implement" the Sagip Saka Act of 2019 (RA No. 11321) that he authored.

On May 12, 2025, Pangilinan won a fourth non-consecutive term in the Senate after placing fifth in the official results with 15,343,229 votes. He was proclaimed as senator-elect by the Commission on Elections on May 17. Aquino also won, having placed second. According to The Philippine Star, both Aquino and Pangilinan defied pre-election surveys consistently showing him outside the top 12 candidates.

=== Tenure ===
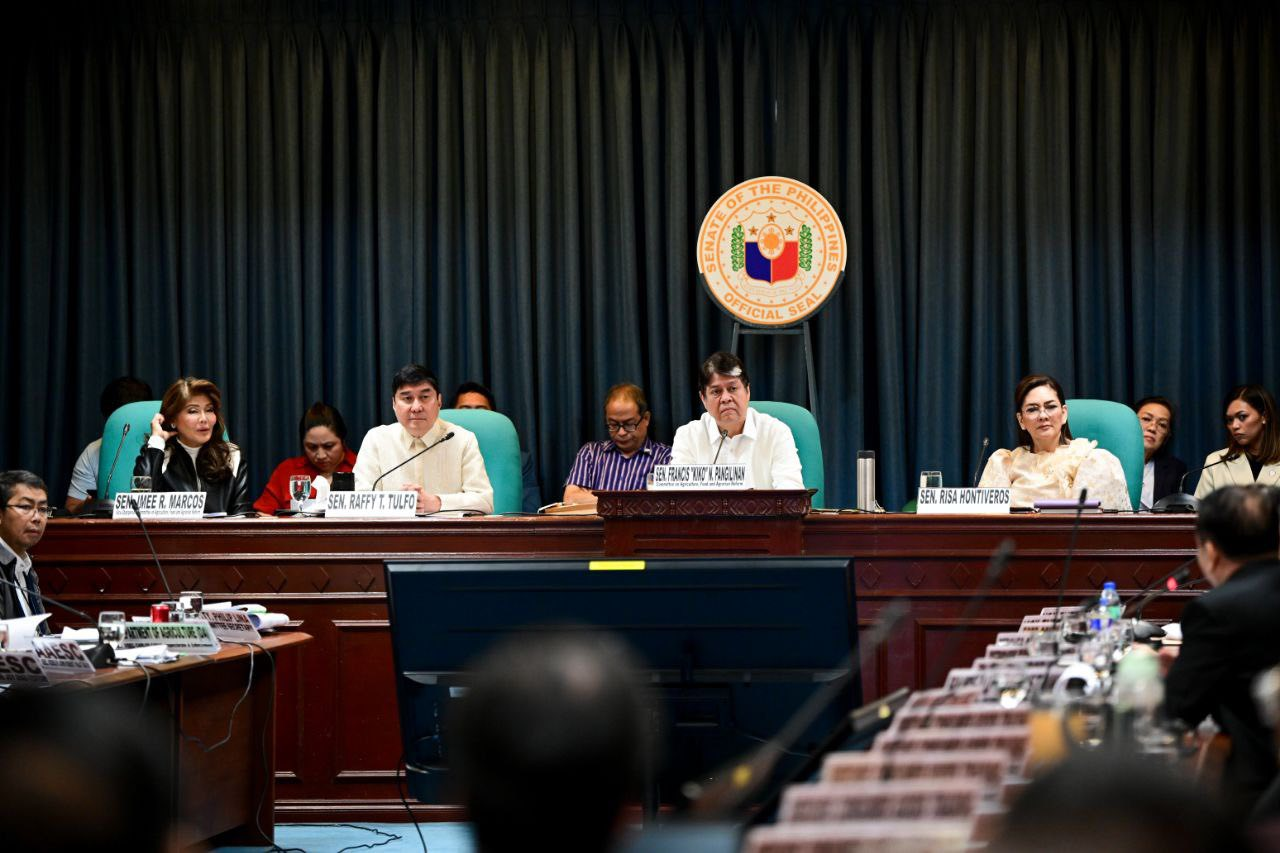
Pangilinan chairs a hearing of the Senate Committee on Agriculture, Food and Agrarian Reform, September 1, 2025.

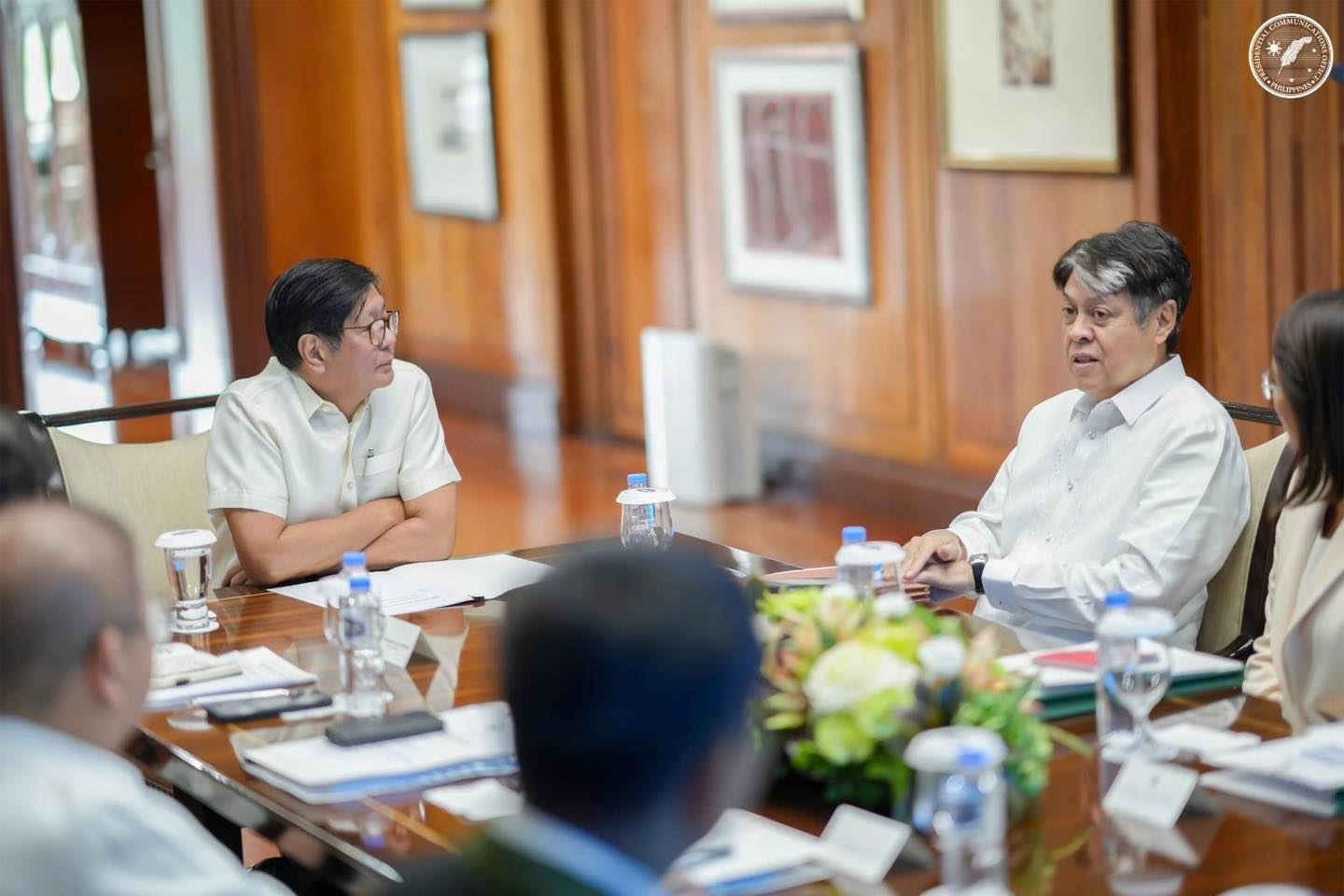
Pangilinan (right) meeting with President Bongbong Marcos at Malacañang Palace, September 25, 2025.

Pangilinan took his oath of office before Supreme Court Associate Justice Marvic Leonen on June 18, ahead of his term beginning on June 30.

In the 20th Congress (2025–2028), Pangilinan joined the Senate majority bloc to pursue the chairpersonship of the Senate Committee on Agriculture, Food and Agrarian Reform.

On July 9, 2025, Pangilinan filed a series of Senate resolutions calling for a legislative review of key agriculture and fisheries policies to ensure they benefit small farmers and fisherfolk. The resolutions seek to evaluate the implementation of the Sagip Saka Act, which he authored to improve market access for producers; assess the impact of the Rice Tariffication Law, including the possible restoration of the National Food Authority's regulatory functions; and examine the effects of commercial fishing in municipal waters on small-scale fishers. Citing feedback from rural communities during his 2022 vice-presidential campaign, Pangilinan emphasized the need to ensure that existing laws are effectively serving their intended beneficiaries.

== Other endeavors ==
=== Academic ===
Pangilinan worked as a lecturer on civil law, political law, and labor law at the Ateneo de Manila University from 1993 to 2000.

=== Media ===
While studying law in the 1990s, Pangilinan began working as a legal analyst and commentator for ABS-CBN's News and Current Affairs division, where he served as Head of the Legal Desk from 1998 to 2001 and contributed legal expertise across various programs. From 1993 until his election as senator in 2001, he was an anchorperson on several public service shows on both television and radio, including Batas (1998–2001), Aksyon Ngayon (1994–1997), and Relos Report with Atty. Kiko (1999–2001), all on DZMM.

From 1993 to 1997, Pangilinan co-anchored the public service and legal advice show Hoy Gising! on ABS-CBN, where he addressed community grievances on air and helped mediate between citizens and public agencies. Pangilinan attributed the show to giving him early public exposure and the opportunity to engage in grassroots concerns through media. It was also through Hoy Gising! where Pangilinan met his future wife, actress Sharon Cuneta, who appeared as a guest in one episode to promote a film.

In the late 1990s and early 2000s, Pangilinan expanded his media involvement by hosting and co-anchoring various community-oriented programs, including Barangay Dos (2000–2001), a public affairs show with Karen Davila that tackled local issues. He also worked extensively as a legal analyst and commentator, contributing to legal education and civic engagement via broadcast platforms like DZMM, where he explained laws and citizen rights in accessible terms.

After entering politics, Pangilinan continued to engage in media-related efforts. In 2021, during the COVID-19 lockdown, he and Cuneta appeared in a family-oriented YouTube vlog series highlighting their home and farm life. In 2022, he was featured on Toni Gonzaga's YouTube talk show Toni Talks, where he discussed his career, personal journey, and reflections on public service.

In 2024, Pangilinan returned to hosting with two short-term public affairs programs. He hosted Hello Pagkain! on One PH from March to October 2024, focusing on food security and agricultural issues, and co-anchored Rekta: Agenda ng Masa on DZRH from May to October 2024, a current affairs show that tackled grassroots concerns.

=== Entrepreneurship ===
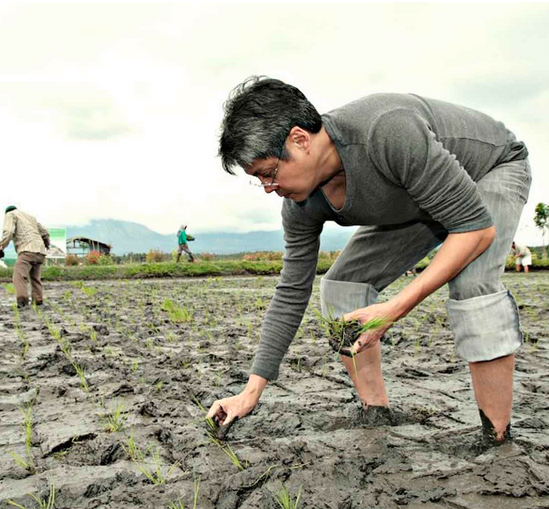
Pangilinan planting rice in 2013.

While studying at UP, Pangilinan started a fishball stand along Commonwealth Avenue in Quezon City. He later expanded it into a small business called "Eat-a-bols", with three locations, 40 steel carts, and a partnership with Nestlé to serve Nestea alongside fishballs.

In 2012, Pangilinan and his wife, Sharon Cuneta, established Sweet Spring Country Farm in Alfonso, Cavite, a 1.7-hectare (0.017 km^{2}) family farm that utilizes sustainable farming practices. The farm follows organic and all-natural methods. Pangilinan said that they named it after a natural spring on the property and that it started partly out of a personal need for healthier food for their children (two of whom have allergies and asthma). By growing organic produce and raising free-range poultry, the Pangilinan family ensured a chemical-free diet, which is also consistent with Francis's policy interest in safe, sustainable agriculture. Over time, Sweet Spring Country Farm began selling its produce—such as lettuce, kale, herbs, and root crops—to organic markets and restaurants under its own brand. It also produces artisanal farm products like vinegar made from local sap and brewed coffee from its small plantation. Pangilinan has noted that even natural insecticides are made on-site.

He employs local community members and often invites farmer groups to the farm for training or dialogue. In media features, Pangilinan is shown personally tending to crops or driving a tractor. The Sweet Spring Country Farm has hosted agricultural workshops and is open for educational tours. In a 2023 profile, he welcomed elderly and youth farmers from the area to his farm, underscoring that small farmers remain "the best hope" for "feeding the nation." Pangilinan and Cuneta have invested in farm infrastructure like greenhouses and rainwater harvesting.

=== Authorship ===
In May 2018, Pangilinan released his first book, Tagsibol, which chronicles his personal journey into farming and agricultural advocacy. The book reflects on his experience beginning with his chairmanship of the Senate Committee on Agriculture in 2010 and details how his commitment to farming deepened through the establishment of his family-owned Sweet Spring Country Farm in Cavite. Framed as a tribute to Filipino farmers, Pangilinan wrote about the importance of agriculture in national development and aims to inspire greater public respect and support for the farming sector. Pangilinan has described the book as a contribution to passing on the value of farming to future generations.

== Political positions ==
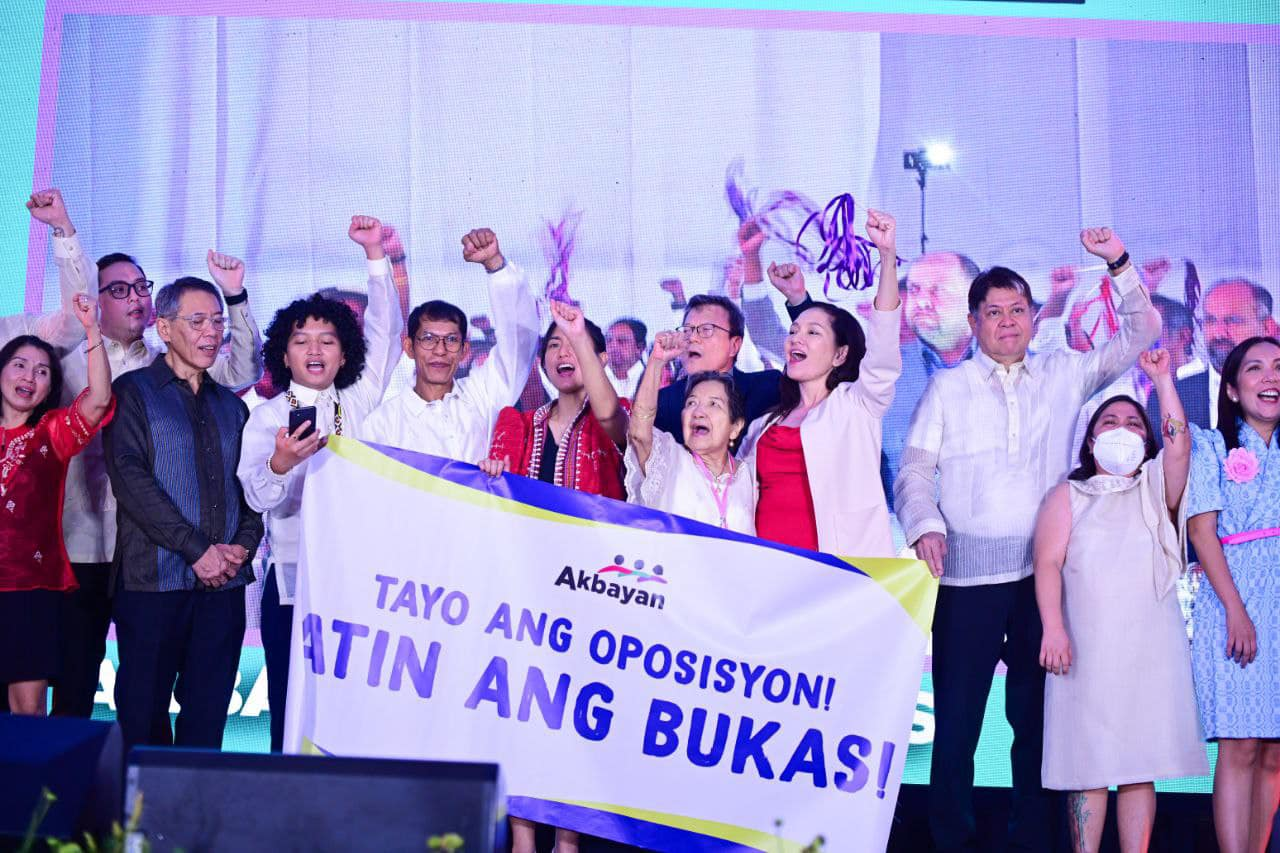
Pangilinan (third from the right) at an Akbayan conference in Manila, joining opposition figures Chel Diokno, Risa Hontiveros, and Etta Rosales, August 2024.

Political analysts and journalists have described Pangilinan as a liberal and progressive legislator who occupies a center-left position within Philippine politics, notably through his leadership of the Liberal Party and his consistent opposition stance during President Rodrigo Duterte's administration (2016–2022). He has advocated for strong public health measures and criticized the Duterte government's COVID-19 response, supported increased regulation of social media platforms to curb disinformation, and promoted agricultural modernization and food security through laws such as the Sagip Saka Act. Pangilinan has consistently supported expanded education funding, environmental sustainability, anti-corruption and transparency measures, human rights protections—including opposition to the death penalty and extrajudicial killings—and has taken a firm stance on asserting Philippine sovereignty in the West Philippine Sea. He also favors improved labor rights, including ending contractualization, and supports civil unions for same-sex couples while maintaining a cautious stance on divorce.

== Personal life ==
On April 28, 1996, Pangilinan married singer, actress, and television personality Sharon Cuneta, whom he met on a taping of his show Hoy Gising!. The couple has two daughters, including singer-songwriter Kakie, and an adopted son. Pangilinan is also the legal adoptive father of actress and singer KC Concepcion, Cuneta's daughter from a previous marriage, whom Pangilinan legally adopted.

As of 2025, Pangilinan and Cuneta reside in Ayala Westgrove Heights in Silang, Cavite. They also own two condominium units in Makati.

On March 11, 2024, Pangilinan filed a 10-page complaint-affidavit before the Department of Justice against the YouTube channel Bungangera TV and representatives of Google or YouTube Philippines for cyberlibel, after the channel accused him of domestic abuse.

On May 10, 2024, Cuneta and Pangilinan jointly filed cyberlibel complaints against broadcaster Cristy Fermin, citing defamatory remarks concerning their personal and family affairs. In July 2025, the couple withdrew the complaints after Fermin issued a public apology.

Pangilinan is a first cousin of Alfonso Miranda, the father of Parokya ni Edgar lead vocalist Chito Miranda.

== Electoral history ==
Electoral history of Kiko Pangilinan
Year	Office	Party	Votes received				Result
Year	Office	Party	Total	%	P.	Swing	Result
1988	Councilor (Quezon City–4th)	LDP	—N/a	—N/a	—N/a	—N/a	Won
1992	Representative (Quezon City-4th)	LDP	62,856	41.78%	2nd	—N/a	Lost
2001	Senator of the Philippines	Liberal	10,971,896	37.23%	8th	—N/a	Won
2007	Senator of the Philippines	Liberal	14,534,678	49.27%	5th	+12.04	Won
2016	Senator of the Philippines	Liberal	15,955,949	35.47%	8th	-13.8	Won
2025	Senator of the Philippines	Liberal	15,343,229	26.75%	5th	-8.72	Won
2022	Vice President of the Philippines	Liberal	9,329,207	17.82%	2nd	—N/a	Lost

== See also ==
- List of Harvard University politicians

== Notes ==
Senate of the Philippines
Preceded by Loren Legarda	Majority leader of the Senate of the Philippines; 2004–2008	Succeeded by Migz Zubiri
Preceded by Gregorio Honasan	Chair of the Philippine Senate Agrarian Reform Committee; 2009–2010	Succeeded by Gregorio Honasan
Preceded by Loren Legarda	Chair of the Philippine Senate Agriculture and Food Committee; 2010–2013	Succeeded by Cynthia Villar
Preceded by Cynthia Villar	Chair of the Philippine Senate Agriculture and Food Committee; 2016–2017	Succeeded by Cynthia Villar
Political offices
New office	Presidential Assistant for Food Security and Agricultural Modernization; 2014–2015	Succeeded by Fredelita Guiza
Party political offices
Preceded by Joseph Emilio Abaya	President of the Liberal Party; 2016–2022	Succeeded by Edcel Lagman
Preceded by Benigno Aquino III	Chair Emeritus of the Liberal Party; 2026–present	Incumbent
Preceded by Leni Robredo	Chairperson of the Liberal Party; 2022–2026	Succeeded by Leila de Lima
Preceded by Leni Robredo	Liberal nominee for Vice President of the Philippines; 2022	Most recent
