= Judicial, Executive and Legislative Advisory and Consultative Council =

Philippines government body

The Judicial, Executive and Legislative Advisory and Consultative Council (JELACC) of the Philippines is a body created by a memorandum of agreement (MOA) signed on May 13, 2008, which serves as "the forum and venue for the representatives of the 3 branches of the government to undertake measures on matters affecting the primacy of the rule of law, specifically tasked to identify the problems and issues, formulate solutions, and to implement them." The historical move which was aimed "to strengthen the consultation and coordination among the three branches of government in upholding the rule of law." JELACC was the brainchild of Francis Pangilinan, first proposed on the July 16–17, 2007, Manila Hotel summit on extrajudicial killings and forced disappearances in the Philippines.

== History ==
The 21st Chief Justice Artemio Panganiban traced Jelacc's roots from the 1993 proposed similar tripartite council, a body tasked to undertake judicial reforms. Chief Justice Andres Narvasa turned down membership due to legal questions and instead, a deputy court administrator attended the meetings merely as observer, not as member.

Narvasa thereafter created the "Blueprint of Action for the Judiciary," an 18-month consultation or judiciary-wide dialogue, funded by the United Nations Development Program (UNDP). Later, Chief Justice Hilario Davide Jr. formed the much broader Action Program for Judicial Reforms (APJR), supported by the Philippine government, the UNDP, World Bank and Asian Development Bank, with further assistance from Australia, United Kingdom, Canada, European Union, Japan, the Netherlands and the United States.

In Panganiban's tenure, APJR centered on 4 ACID problems of the judiciary: "(1) Access to justice by the poor; (2) Corruption; (3) Incompetence of some judges; and (4) Delay in the resolution of cases with the 4 Ins: Independence, Integrity, Industry and Intelligence, and with ultimate goals of safeguarding of liberty and the nurturance of prosperity under the rule of law."

Narvasa, Davide and Panganiban's judicial reforms achieved "the a) the doubling of judicial compensation through Republic Act 9227, b) computerization of the Sandiganbayan and selected trial courts, c) construction of model court houses in Angeles and Lapu-Lapu cities, and the d) creation of the unique electronic library, the mobile courts, funded by Japan, and the Tagaytay Philippine Judicial Academy Center in Tagaytay", inter alia.

On fiscal independence, the Supreme Court of the Philippines looks to Jelac "as the alternative for the annual budgetary grilling but it limited Jelac’s 'mandate' to its present functions." Panganiban finally criticized Jelac for being "obscured by penumbras of unconstitutionality and impropriety."

On the 2008 Philippine Declaration of Independence Day, JELACC member and Senate Majority Leader Francis Kiko Pangilinan announced at its second meeting that the judiciary would get an additional P 3-billion budget (from P 10 billion this year to P13 billion for 2009): "This is unprecedented and will bring the judiciary's budget to 1% of the national budget for the first time." The huge amount will be used for priority projects like the Manila Halls of Justice, courts computerization and to fill up vacancies in the judiciary (20% of 2500 courts nationwide).

== Composition ==
JELACC is composed of 9 members who shall serve ex-oficio capacity without any additional emoluments and/or allowances: the President of the Republic, as Chairperson, with the Vice-President, the Senate President, the House Speaker, the Chief Justice as regular members; a Cabinet member to be designated by the President, one Senator and one member from the House Representative to be designated by their respective leaders, and an Associate Justice of the Supreme Court of the Philippines to be designated by the Chief Justice.

== Functions and role ==
President Gloria Macapagal Arroyo defined the council's role, general functions, mission and vision: "The JELACC will work together to institutionalize consultation, cooperation, and coordination in pursuit of the rule of law and the advancement of our nation. Separation does not mean isolation. Rather, among our co-equal branches, there should be consultation and cooperation to advance shared priorities in the national interest and welfare of all Filipinos; We envision JELACC to be the venue where representatives of the three branches can identify issues pertaining to the primacy of the rule of law and formulate and undertake solutions to strengthen due process and the institutions of justice, and implement our laws better. The JELACC's mandate is centered on the rule of law."

Senator Kiko Pangilinan stated that the council will prioritize budgetary support for the judiciary, co-equal branch, with agreement of allocating 20% percent increase in the judiciary's budget to raise the salary of government lawyers and upgrade courts capabilities: "By the legislative and executive action, the beneficiary of the JELAC is the judiciary." The judiciary's budget share is a measly 0.8% of the entire national budget, specifically, only P 8.4 billion ($1 = P 42), of the 2008 budget of the entire Judiciary and is almost equal the budget of the Department of Justice (DoJ).

Senate President Manuel Villar also set forth the council's greater aim "to make the three branches work together for the people." Villar also said that the new body will address extrajudicial killings and press freedom as priorities.

On the Judiciary, JELACC formulates solutions on, inter alia, the judiciary's (1) budget, (2) infrastructure requirements, (3) creation of new positions and filling of vacancies, (4) career development program, (5) compensation and security of judicial officials, and (6) security of tenure of judicial personnel.

Press Secretary and Presidential Spokesman Ignacio Bunye stated that JELACC will not replace the Legislative-Executive Development Advisory Council (LEDAC), and that both forums will help improve national governance.

== "Historic moment in our constitutional democracy" ==
President Gloria Macapagal Arroyo led the signing of the MOA by leaders of the 3 branches of government on May 13, 2008, as Chief Justice Reynato Puno, Senate President Manuel Villar and Speaker Prospero Nograles signed for the judiciary, Senate and House, respectively. The historic document was also signed by acknowledging witnesses Vice President Noli de Castro, Executive Secretary Eduardo Ermita, Senator Francis Pangilinan, and House Majority Floor Leader Arthur Defensor, Sr.

== See also ==
- Supreme Court of the Philippines
- Chief Justice of the Supreme Court of the Philippines
- Associate Justice of the Supreme Court of the Philippines
- Constitution of the Philippines
- Political history of the Philippines
- Constitutionalism
- Constitutional economics
- Rule according to higher law
