= Philippine Senate Committee on Constitutional Amendments and Revision of Codes =

Standing committee of the Senate of the Philippines

Committee on Constitutional Amendments and Revision of Codes
- Senate of the Philippines; 20th Congress

History
- New session started: July 28, 2025

Leadership
- Chair: Robin Padilla (PDP) since June 3, 2026
- Seats: 13

The Philippine Senate Committee on Constitutional Amendments and Revision of Codes is a standing committee of the Senate of the Philippines.

It was known as the Committee on Constitutional Amendments, Revision of Codes and Laws until September 2, 2013.

== Jurisdiction ==
According to the Rules of the Senate, the committee handles all matters relating to:

- Proposed amendments to the Constitution of the Philippines
- Revision of existing legal codes

== Members, 20th Congress ==
Based on the Rules of the Senate, the Senate Committee on Constitutional Amendments and Revision of Codes has 13 members.

As of May 20, 2026
Majority	Minority
Robin Padilla (PDP), Chair	Vacant

Ex officio members:

- Senate President pro tempore Loren Legarda
- Acting Majority Floor Leader Joel Villanueva
- Minority Floor Leader Tito Sotto

Committee secretary: Ethel Hope Dignadice-Villaflor

== Historical membership rosters ==
=== 20th Congress ===
August 12, 2025 – May 11, 2026
Majority	Minority
Kiko Pangilinan (Liberal), Chair	Rodante Marcoleta (Independent), Deputy Minority Leader
Pia Cayetano (Nacionalista), Vice Chair	Joel Villanueva (Independent), Deputy Minority Leader
JV Ejercito (NPC), Deputy Majority Leader	Ronald dela Rosa (PDP)
Risa Hontiveros (Akbayan), Deputy Majority Leader	Bong Go (PDP)
Bam Aquino (KANP)	Robin Padilla (PDP)
Win Gatchalian (NPC)	
Lito Lapid (NPC)	
Loren Legarda (NPC)	

Ex officio members:

- Senate President pro tempore Panfilo Lacson
- Majority Floor Leader Juan Miguel Zubiri
- Minority Floor Leader Alan Peter Cayetano

Committee secretary: Ethel Hope Dignadice-Villaflor

=== 19th Congress ===
until June 30, 2025
Majority	Minority
Robin Padilla (PDP), Chair	Risa Hontiveros (Akbayan), Deputy Minority Leader
Alan Peter Cayetano (Independent), Vice Chair	
JV Ejercito (NPC), Deputy Majority Leader	
Mark Villar (Nacionalista), Deputy Majority Leader	
Pia Cayetano (Nacionalista)	
Ronald dela Rosa (PDP)	
Win Gatchalian (NPC)	
Bong Go (PDP)	
Lito Lapid (NPC)	
Loren Legarda (NPC)	
Grace Poe (Independent)	
Bong Revilla (Lakas)	

Ex officio members:

- Senate President pro tempore Loren Legarda (July 25, 2022 – May 20, 2024)
- Senate President pro tempore Jinggoy Estrada (May 20, 2024 – June 30, 2025)
- Majority Floor Leader Joel Villanueva (July 25, 2022 – May 20, 2024)
- Majority Floor Leader Francis Tolentino (May 20, 2024 – June 30, 2025)
- Minority Floor Leader Koko Pimentel

Committee secretary: Ethel Hope Dignadice-Villaflor

== See also ==
- List of Philippine Senate committees
