= Presidential Assistant for Food Security and Agricultural Modernization =

Cabinet level position in the Philippines

- Member of: Cabinet of the Philippines
- Reports to: President of the Philippines
- Constituting instrument: Memorandum Order No. 70/2014
- Formation: May 5, 2014
- First holder: Francis Pangilinan
- Deputy: Fredelita Guiza

The Presidential Assistant for Food Security and Agricultural Modernization (PAFSAM) was a Cabinet-level position under the Office of the President of the Philippines. It was created on May 5, 2014, by President Benigno Aquino III.

The PAFSAM has oversight responsibilities for the four largest executive agencies that were formerly under the purview of the Department of Agriculture (DA): the Fertilizer and Pesticide Authority (FPA), the National Food Authority (NFA), the National Irrigation Administration (NIA), and the Philippine Coconut Authority (PCA). Former Senator Francis Pangilinan was named as the first PAFSAM.

== Background ==
The post of PAFSAM was created amidst accusations of DA involvement in the Priority Development Assistance Fund (PDAF) scam. Agencies under the DA had allegedly used PDAF monies to make payments to NGOs with links to Janet Lim-Napoles; in Congressional testimony, she provided a list of names of people involved in the scam. Secretary of Agriculture Proceso Alcala was not mentioned in this list, but he was still reported to be under pressure to resign. President Aquino's Memorandum Order No. 70 of May 5, 2014, created the post of PAFSAM, while Executive Order No. 165, signed on the same day, reassigned four former Department of Agriculture agencies to the Office of the President so that they could be overseen by the new PAFSAM.

== Transfer of agencies ==
The transferred agencies represented three-quarters of the DA's P68.59 billion budget, leading the Manila Standard Today to describe the situation as Alcala "los[ing] Agri control" and being "reduced to a mere titular head". However, the DA retained control over the National Dairy Corporation and thirty-five smaller agencies. Opposition politicians including Jonathan dela Cruz of Abakada were dissatisfied with the mere reduction in Alcala's powers, and continued to call for President Aquino to dismiss him.

After the reassignment of the four agencies from the DA to the PAFSAM, two of Alcala's appointees — Orlan Calayag of the NFA and Euclides Forbes of the PCA — submitted what they referred to as "courtesy resignations", stating that they wanted to allow Pangilinan to be able to appoint his own preferred candidates to lead their respective agencies. Alcala's other appointee, NIA administrator Claro Maranan, decided to serve out the rest of his originally-appointed term until June, though his acting senior deputy administrator Felix Razo resigned on May 5. FPA director Norli Gicana, who was not an Alcala appointee, did not make any comment on whether or not he would resign.

== Policies and programs ==
President Aquino appointed Pangilinan, the former head of the Senate's Committee on Agriculture, as the first PAFSAM with a mission to "clean up" the DA; in media comments, Pangilinan speculated that Aquino felt pressure to deal with agriculture issues, and with only two years of his term remaining, said that Aquino decided that drastic measures were necessary. In media comments in late May 2014, Pangilinan stated his belief "secure farmers" were a prerequisite for food security in the Philippines, but that "[a] new generation refuses to go into farming". He also suggested the need for establishment of model farms to promulgate new technologies to farmers.
