= Philippine Senate Committee on Agriculture, Food and Agrarian Reform =

Standing committee of the Senate of the Philippines

Committee on Agriculture, Food and Agrarian Reform
- Senate of the Philippines; 20th Congress

History
- New session started: July 28, 2025

Leadership
- Chair: Kiko Pangilinan, LP since June 3, 2026
- Seats: 17

The Philippine Senate Committee on Agriculture, Food and Agrarian Reform is a standing committee of the Senate of the Philippines.

This committee was formed after the Committee on Agriculture and Food and the Committee on Agrarian Reform were merged on September 3, 2019, pursuant to Senate Resolution No. 9 of the 18th Congress.

== Jurisdiction ==
According to the Rules of the Senate, the committee handles all matters relating to:

- Agriculture, food production and agri-business, including agricultural experimental stations, agricultural economics and research
- Soil survey and conservation
- Agricultural education
- Technical extension services
- Animal husbandry
- Livestock quarantine
- Agricultural support price
- Fisheries and aquatic resources
- Agrarian reform
- Landed estates
- Implementation of the agrarian land reform provisions of the Constitution

== House Counterparts ==
The jurisdiction of the Senate Committee on Agriculture, Food and Agrarian Reform has counterparts in the House of Representatives:

- House Committee on Agrarian Reform
- House Committee on Agriculture and Food
- House Committee on Aquaculture and Fisheries Resources

== Members, 20th Congress ==
Based on the Rules of the Senate, the Senate Committee on Agriculture, Food and Agrarian Reform has 17 members. On May 11, 2026, during the ouster of Senate President Tito Sotto, the positions within the committee were declared vacant alongside all other Senate committees.

As of May 11, 2026
Majority	Minority
Vacant

Ex officio members:

- Senate President pro tempore Vicente Sotto III
- Majority Floor Leader Juan Miguel Zubiri
- Minority Floor Leader Alan Peter Cayetano

== Historical membership rosters ==
=== 20th Congress ===
July 29, 2025 – May 11, 2026
Majority	Minority
Kiko Pangilinan (Liberal), Chair	Rodante Marcoleta (Independent), Deputy Minority Leader
Camille Villar (Nacionalista), Vice Chair	Joel Villanueva (Independent), Deputy Minority Leader
JV Ejercito (NPC), Deputy Majority Leader	Ronald dela Rosa (PDP)
Risa Hontiveros (Akbayan), Deputy Majority Leader	Bong Go (PDP)
Bam Aquino (KANP)	Imee Marcos (Nacionalista)
Pia Cayetano (Nacionalista)	Robin Padilla (PDP)
Win Gatchalian (NPC)	
Lito Lapid (NPC)	
Loren Legarda (NPC)	
Erwin Tulfo (Lakas)	
Raffy Tulfo (Independent)	

Ex officio members:

- Senate President pro tempore Panfilo Lacson
- Majority Floor Leader Juan Miguel Zubiri
- Minority Floor Leader Alan Peter Cayetano

Committee secretary: Philip M. Lina

=== 19th Congress ===
July 26, 2022 – June 30, 2025
Majority	Minority
Cynthia Villar (Nacionalista), Chair	Risa Hontiveros (Akbayan), Deputy Minority Leader
Ronald dela Rosa (PDP), Vice Chair	
Imee Marcos (Nacionalista), Vice Chair	
JV Ejercito (NPC), Deputy Majority Leader	
Mark Villar (Nacionalista), Deputy Majority Leader	
Nancy Binay (UNA)	
Alan Peter Cayetano (Independent)	
Pia Cayetano (Nacionalista)	
Win Gatchalian (NPC)	
Bong Go (PDP)	
Lito Lapid (NPC)	
Loren Legarda (NPC)	
Robin Padilla (PDP)	
Bong Revilla (Lakas)	
Raffy Tulfo (Independent)	
Joel Villanueva (Independent)	

Ex officio members:

- Senate President pro tempore Loren Legarda (July 25, 2022 – May 20, 2024)
- Senate President pro tempore Jinggoy Estrada (May 20, 2024 – June 30, 2025)
- Majority Floor Leader Joel Villanueva (July 25, 2022 – May 20, 2024)
- Majority Floor Leader Francis Tolentino (May 20, 2024 – June 30, 2025)
- Minority Floor Leader Koko Pimentel

Committee secretary: Philip M. Lina

=== 16th Congress ===
Position	Member	Party
Chairperson	Cynthia Villar	Nacionalista

=== 15th Congress ===
Position	Member	Party
Chairperson	Kiko Pangilinan	Liberal

=== 14th Congress ===
Position	Member	Party
Chairperson	Loren Legarda	NPC

=== 13th Congress ===
Position	Member	Party
Chairperson	Ramon Magsaysay Jr.	Liberal

=== 12th Congress ===
Position	Member	Party
Chairperson	Ramon Magsaysay Jr.	Lakas

==== Chairperson ====
- Manny Villar (Independent)

=== 11th Congress ===
Position	Member	Party
Chairperson	Sergio Osmeña III	Liberal

== See also ==
- List of Philippine Senate committees
