= Endo contractualization =

Form of exploitative temporary employment

Endo (derived from "end-of-contract") refers to a short-term de facto employment practice in the Philippines. It is a form of contractualization in which companies provide workers with temporary "employment" that lasts for less than six months (or strictly speaking, 180 calendar days) and then terminate their employment just before they can be regularized, to skirt the costs that come with the benefits of regularization. Some examples of such benefits are the de jure "employer-and-employee relationship"-mandated SSS / GSIS, PhilHealth, and Pag-IBIG Fund contributions, paid time off (leaves), and a 13th month pay, among others.

== Overview ==
The term endo is derived from an abridged version of the phrase "end-of-contract." It is also sometimes referred to as "5-5-5," which alludes to the practice of terminating a non-regular employee's contract after five months.

Under the Labor Code of the Philippines (Presidential Decree No. 442), employers may employ individuals on a probationary status for a period not exceeding six months. The Supreme Court of the Philippines, in various rulings, has specified that this period is 180 calendar days from the first day of work. In the endo system, a worker's employment contract is terminated before they complete the six months (180 days), which would otherwise lead to them becoming a regular worker entitled to mandated benefits such as health, security, and insurance.

Contractualization is one of the most controversial labor practices in the Philippines. Since the Labor Code's adoption in 1974, it has been amended with several implementing texts. As of June 2016, there were an estimated 356,000 probationary workers in the Philippines.

== Types of employment in the Philippines ==
=== Regular employment ===
A regular employee is defined by the 1974 Labor Code as one who is "engaged to perform activities which are usually necessary or desirable in the usual business or trade of the employer."

The Labor Code recognizes two types of regular employees:

1. Those who perform tasks that are necessary or desirable for the employer's business or trade.
2. Casual, fixed-term, or project employees who have rendered at least one year of service, whether continuous or broken, in the same activity in which they were employed.

A regular employee (whether de jure, fixed-term, or project-based) is entitled to several mandated benefits, including but not limited to:

- Social Security
  - Social Security System (SSS): Private companies are required to register all regular employees with the SSS (RA 8282), which provides retirement and health insurance.
  - Government Service Insurance System: For government employees, who can also be a member and contributors to the SSS but at their own cost.
- Philippine Health Insurance Corporation (PhilHealth): Both private and public sector workers must contribute to this service (RA 7875) for medical insurance.
- Home Development Mutual Fund (HDMF or Pag-IBIG): This agency provides low-interest housing loans, payable for up to 30 years. Private and public firms are also mandated to contribute to this fund on behalf of their regular employees (RA 7835).
- 13th month pay, five days of Service Incentive Leave (SIL) for every 12 months of service rendered, and maternity benefits, among others.

The employee's portion of these benefits is deducted from the employee's gross monthly salary by the employer, as required by law.

=== Probationary employment ===
In addition to regular employment, probationary employment is also recognized by the Labor Code. Under Article 296, probationary employment shall not exceed six months "unless it is covered by an apprenticeship agreement stipulating a longer period." Any employee who works beyond the probationary period automatically becomes a regular employee.

The security of tenure protects both regular and non-regular employees, a constitutional guarantee found in Section 3, Article XIII of the 1987 Philippine Constitution. It states that no employee, whether regular or non-regular, shall be terminated without a just or authorized cause. While probationary employees are not entitled to the same benefits as regular employees, they are still protected from illegal dismissal.

== Labor-only contracting ==
Department Order No. 3 (series of 2001) explicitly prohibits labor-only contracting, defined to be a type of employment wherein:

"the contractor or subcontractor merely recruits, supplies or places workers to perform a job, work or service for a principal, and the following elements are present:

(a) The contractor or subcontractor does not have substantial capital or investment to actually perform the job, work or service under its own account and responsibility; and

(b) The employees recruited, supplied or placed by such contractor or subcontractor is performing activities, which are directly related to the main business of the principal".

Contracts or subcontracts whose existence precede the effectivity of the Order are given non-impairment and non-diminution of benefits."

== Government response ==
=== Marcos administration ===
Contractualization has its roots in 1974, under the rule of Ferdinand Marcos, when Ernesto "Boy" Herrera helped draft Presidential Decree 442. This decree, which Marcos eventually passed, would give the provisions and grounds for the contractualization of workers in the Philippines.

The Labor Code of 1974 introduced the concept of probationary employment to the Philippines. Under Article 281, it states that "employers are allowed to hire people under a probationary status for up to six months. These 6 months are used as a trial period for the employee. If the employee is allowed to work after the 6 month of the probationary period, they will be considered a regular employee." which upon further reading continues as follows "the services of an employee who has been engaged on a probationary basis may be terminated for a just cause or when he fails to qualify as a regular employee in accordance with reasonable standards made known by the employer to the employee at the time of his engagement." If an employee is unable to show that they possess the necessary skills to keep the job, they may be terminated from employment."

Effectively, Article 281 and its legal loophole were identified by companies and, since then, have been used as a primary basis for laying off workers to avoid extra costs associated with regular employment.

=== Cory Aquino administration ===
During the Cory Aquino administration from 1986 to 1992, Republic Act 6715 of 1989, also known as the Herrera Law, was passed. It was this law that gave the first major revisions to the original Philippine Labor Code drafted earlier during the Marcos Presidency. This revised Philippine Labor Code was amended to combat workplace discrimination against women and to extend workers' rights in employment. However, this revision under the administration of Corazon Aquino did not tackle contractualization directly and effectively. For example, Article 279 of the labor code was amended to provide better security of tenure for workers. This article states that:

"In cases of regular employment, the employer shall not terminate the services of an employee except for just cause or when authorized by this Title. An Employee who is unjustly dismissed from work shall be entitled to reinstatement without loss of seniority rights and other privileges and to his full back wages, inclusive of allowances, and to his other benefits or their monetary equivalent computed from the time his compensation was withheld from him up to the time of his actual reinstatement."

This failed to recognize the situation of those employed on probation. Regular employees could not have their services terminated without cause, but for a probationary employee to attain this regular status, they would need to work more than six months.

=== Ramos administration ===
President Fidel V. Ramos vowed to end contractualization to address the plight of suffering Filipino people and had the Philippine Labor Code amended to extend the powers of the Secretary of Labor, along with the powers of the regional directors, to more efficiently handle violations of the Labor Code and hopefully tame and curb the growing problem of exploitative contractualization. The amendment is quoted as follows, Article 106 of the Revised Labor Code, "The Secretary of Labor and Employment may, by appropriate regulations, restrict or prohibit the contracting-out of labor to protect the rights of workers established under this Code." This amendment to the Philippine Labor Code effectively gives the power of ending or continuing contracting-out of labor into the hands of the then-DOLE Secretary.

Then-DOLE Secretary Leonardo Quisumbing issued Department Order 10 in May 1997, strengthening the practice of contracting out labor by granting employers additional allowances while safeguarding employee rights. Department Order 10 propagated the concept of agencies through "Permissible contracting or subcontracting." It was here when employees started coining the word Endo in response to the 5 months - 5 months - 5 months work schedule of most contractual employees.

It was also this change in provision on the Philippine Labor Code and the DOLE Department Order 10, compounded together, which made the problems of Endo worse off in the administration of Fidel V. Ramos.

=== Estrada administration ===
With the growing Endo Contractualization practices in the Philippines also came a myriad of worker abuse complaints, which gave rise to multiple worker protests and led to the then-DOLE Labor Secretary Patricia Sto. Tomas passed DOLE Department Order 3 in 2001, which revoked the previously passed DOLE Department Order 10. This, however, also removed the changes to the rights of a contractual employee as outlined in Department Order 10. These rights included giving contractual employees the same benefits as regular employees, a promise of proper working conditions, service incentive leave, rest days, and overtime pay, among others. Department Order 3 also included a section that protected existing contracts. Existing contracts between companies and workers had to be fulfilled. Both parties still had rights to the stipulations mentioned in their current contracts.

=== Arroyo administration ===
The DOLE Department Order 3, though it did revoke the previous DOLE Department Order 10, was only a temporary solution.

=== Benigno Aquino administration ===
Upon the transition of power from the 9-year Gloria Macapagal Arroyo administration, the Benigno Aquino III administration started. DOLE Department Order 18 underwent review and was replaced by a new, improved version, DOLE Department Order 18-A. By this point, DOLE has aggressively restricted and regulated the agency contractualization practice, so that it seemed that the norm is not contractualization, whilst regularization is the exception.

=== Duterte administration ===
During his campaign for the 2016 Presidential Election, one of Rodrigo Duterte's promises was the phasing out of contractualization and improvement to labor in the Philippines.

Upon his election, he appointed Silvestre Bello III as Secretary of the Department of Labor and Employment, who was tasked with requiring all companies to place at least 80% of their employees under contract, as per the president's orders. By the end of 2016, around 36000 workers had been regularized. Going into 2017, Duterte and Bello aimed to enact a new permanent policy to end labor-only contractualization by the end of February, but Bello ultimately did not sign it. Instead, he decided to start with dialogue between the president and labor groups to get feedback. Eventually, President Duterte met with the labor groups as Bello drafted a new Department Order that would stop labor contractualization.

However, by March 16, Bello signed Department Order 174, which sets stricter guidelines on contractualization but doesn't ban it. Duterte continued to promise to sign an executive order against it, but the Marawi crisis postponed the signing. As of 2018, no executive order had been signed by President Duterte regarding the complete abolishment of contractualization. Labor groups held a rally on March 15, 2018, to protest the president's delay of the executive order. On May 1, Duterte signed an executive order that would end contractualization. However, labor groups criticized the president because the one signed was not the draft they had agreed to.

The 17th Congress passed Senate Bill 1826 and House Bill 6908 or the Security of Tenure and End of Endo Act, which Duterte vetoed on July 26, 2019. In August 2019, the Makabayan lawmakers, consisting of representatives Arlene Brosas, Carlos Zarate, Ferdinand Gaite, Eufemia Cullamat, France Castro, and Sarah Elago, refiled a "stronger, pro-worker" anti-endo bill, House Bill No. 3381, which sought to repeal Article 106 of the Labor Code of the Philippines and ban all forms of contractualization or labor-only contracting and fixed-term employment; the bill was not passed in the Senate.

=== Marcos Jr. administration ===
In July 2022, Makabayan lawmakers filed House Bill 2173, which sought to end all forms of contractual arrangements, which the bill considers unfair labor practices.

== Policies ==
Under certain Philippine employment protection laws, employers must offer permanent employment after six months of engagement; otherwise, they must lay them off. (LCP Articles 279, 280, 281, 286, and 287). This is commonly referred to as the regularization law. In addition, if the company is unable to regularize them, it may hire temporary workers through principals or service contractors.

== Movements and notable cases ==
In July 2016, the Department of Labor and Employment (DOLE) began inspecting establishments nationwide in response to President Rodrigo Duterte's Executive Order (EO) banning endo and labor only-contracting (LOC) practices. As of April 2018, the DOLE has inspected 99,526 out of over 900,000 establishments in the country.

According to an initial list submitted to the Malacañang Palace, the DOLE reported 3,337 companies suspected of engaging in LOC. Of this total, the DOLE has confirmed that 767 companies engage in such. This initial list also shows that more than 224,000 workers were affected by illegal contracting practices, and that 176,286 workers have already been regularized.

=== Movements ===
==== Magnolia Philippines ====
In a statement released in response to their inclusion in a list of companies without regularized employees, Magnolia Philippines stated the affected workers are not the company's employees but are employed by an unnamed service provider:

"We believe that our inclusion in the list stems not from our contracting of labor but from the use of certain machinery and equipment leased by a DOLE-accredited independent service provider whose workers maintain and operate them. They, not our workers and employees, are the subject of concern of the Department of Labor and Employment (DOLE)."

In the same statement, the company also noted that they have always worked to protect their employees' rights and are coordinating with the DOLE: "We at Magnolia Inc. have always worked to protect the rights of our employees and workers ... We acknowledge this issue and continue to coordinate with the DOLE to immediately address the matter. Nevertheless, as a company, we believe that all our partners should exercise the same care that we do when it comes to ensuring that workers' rights–including security of tenure and all benefits provided for in the Labor Code and prevailing laws–are fully protected. As such, we are committed to working with our providers to ensure this issue is resolved at the soonest time possible."

==== PLDT ====
In 2017, DOLE ordered telecommunications conglomerate PLDT to regularize almost 9000 employees. This order came about after DOLE found out that numerous of PLDT's contractual agencies were violating the labor laws of the Philippines. Several agencies denied their workers the rights stated in the Labor Code of the Philippines such as the 13 month pay. PLDT appealed to the DOLE to reconsider this decision. Still, the appeal was rejected in January 2018, as Labor Secretary Silvestre Bello III said that "his office found no merit to overturn the order." Some contracting agencies, however, were found to be legal, and the number of employees required to be regularized dropped from almost 9,000 to about 8,000. DOLE also required PLDT to pay about Php 66 million in unpaid benefits.

As of June 2, 2018, PLDT began the process to regularize its employees. They continued to appeal to the DOLE about their decision to shut down all the contracting agencies because this, "would effectively shut down these companies and displace not only the workers deployed to PLDT but also thousands of other workers assigned to other principals."

In a 38-page decision penned by Rodil Zalameda and promulgated on February 14, 2024, the High Tribunal ordered the regularization of 7,344 "contractual employees" of PLDT engaged in line installation, repair, and maintenance. It dismissed the consolidated petition for review on certiorari filed by Silvestre Bello III and the Mangaggawa ng Komunikasyon ng Pilipinas (Workers in Philippine Communications - a labor union of PLDT staff), affirming a Court of Appeals judgment that found PLDT and its contractor committed labor violations. It, however, clarified that "labor contracting is not per se illegal, following Article 106 of the Labor Code expressly allowing an employer to engage in legitimate labor contracting, which the DoLE implements through DO 18-A and DO 174-2017." The high court finally remanded the case to the Office of the Regional Director of DOLE-NCR "to review and determine the impact of the regularization of the workers performing installation, repair, and maintenance services and to review, compute, and properly determine the monetary award on the labor standards violation, to which petitioner PLDT Inc. and the concerned contractors are solidarily liable."

=== GMA Network, Inc. ===
In a decision released on January 24, 2026, the Supreme Court of the Philippines ruled that the company known for operating the free-to-air broadcasting on analog TV Channel 7 engaged in what has been popularly termed "labor-only contracting", i.e. "that an employer-employee relationship exists between GMA and respondents ("talents").""

=== The Government itself ===
A "state workers' group" named Confederation for Unity, Recognition, and Advancement of Government Employees (COURAGE) later on added that the government itself was the number one culprit regarding this through "Contract of Service (CoS)" and/or "Job Order (JO)" types of engaging de facto employees.

Under the CoS scheme, hiring is supposedly limited only to consultants, "learning service providers", or technical experts for special projects outside regular agency functions when internal expertise is lacking or direct execution would be impractical or costly. Meanwhile, JO workers may be hired only for emergency or intermittent work, including debris clearing after disasters, or for trades and manual tasks such as carpentry, plumbing, painting, and electrical work that fall outside the agency's regular functions.

As those who are engaged in CoS and JO arrangements do not legally have an "Employer-Employee Relationship" with the government (in particular the specific entity such as department, agency, body, GOCC that they sign a contract with), they do not enjoy the privileges and benefits that de jure [government] employees receive, such as leaves, medical allowance, personnel economic relief allowance (PERA), representation and transportation allowances (RATA), as well as other bonuses, incentives and additional allowances. A "premium", typically 20% over the published base pay for their de jure employee counterparts, are added to as to ostensibly cover what could have had been the government's contribution share to their mandatory deductions (i.e. GSIS / SSS, PAG-IBIG Fund, PHILHEALTH). As they are not de jure employees of the government under such schemes, they cannot contribute even at their own cost to the GSIS, but instead only to the SSS. If not automatically handled by the government entity's human resources department or similar, they also have to do the requisite registration, bookkeeping, receipting, tax return filing ( Forms 1701 (3x Quarterly and Annual, supported by Form 2307) and payment, as the case may be, with the Bureau of Internal Revenue.

=== Notable cases ===
DOLE's initial list, released in late May 2018, back under the presidency of Rodrigo Duterte, identified the top 20 companies suspected or confirmed to practice illegal contracting practices:

1. Jollibee Foods Corporation (14,960); 2. Dole Philippines, Inc. (10,521); 3. PLDT, Inc. (8,310); 4. Philsaga Mining Corp (6,524); 5. General Tuna Corp (5,216); 6. Sumi Phil. Wiring Systems Corp (4,305); 7. Franklin Baker Inc (3,400); 8. Pilipinas Kyohritsu Inc (3,161); 9. Furukawa Automotive Systems Phil Inc (2,863); 10. Magnolia Inc. (2,248)	11. KCC Property Holdings Inc (1,802); 12. Sumifru Philippines Corp (1,687); 13. Hinatuan Mining Corp (1,673); 14. KCC Mall De Zamboanga (1,598); 15. Brother Industries (Philippines) Inc (1,582); 16. Philippine Airlines & PAL Express (1,483); 17. Nidec Precision Philippines Corp (1,400); 18. Peter Paul Phil. Corp (1,362); 19. Dolefil Upper Valley Operations (1,183); 20. Dole-Stanfilco (1,131)

== In popular culture ==
The independently produced Endo was released in theaters in 2007. It was directed by Jade Castro and written by Castro, Michiko Yamamoto, and Moira Lang. It starred Jason Abalos and Irina Feleo.

== See also ==
- Labor policy in the Philippines
- Precariat
