= Incarceration of children in the Philippines =

The jailing of children in the Philippines is a significant problem. According to Amnesty International, over 50,000 children in the Philippines have been arrested and detained since 1995. Torture, rape and other forms of cruel and inhumane treatment are a part of everyday life for those children while they are incarcerated. More recently, a report formally adopted on February 2026 by the Philippine government's own Commission on Human Rights documented a pattern of abuse that begins the moment a child is arrested and does not stop at the facility gate. Most are charged with minor crimes, such as petty theft, sniffing solvents and vagrancy.

== History and statistics ==
By 2001, jailed children in the Philippines were attracting international media attention. The Australian government-owned television network, the Australian Broadcasting Corporation, ran a documentary on the issue in which it stated that children as young as eight are being held in adult prisons in the Philippines in contravention of international statutes and the country's own laws.

In September 2005, it was estimated that over 4,000 children were in jails and detention centers all over the country — many of them mixed with adults.

By May 6, 2005, it was estimated there were 2,100 children in jails across the Philippines, 20 of them on death row.

Getting information on children in jail is difficult. "No one knows what goes on inside of prisons because no one is allowed in," Father Shay Cullen said during an interview with the Western Catholic Reporter, the official newspaper of the Archdiocese of Edmonton.

== Legislation ==
UNICEF is a member of the Juvenile Justice Network-Philippines, a broad coalition of government agencies and non-governmental organizations responsible for groundwork on the landmark child protection law. Since the Juvenile Justice and Welfare Law (Republic Act 9344) was enacted in 2006, there have been improvements, and some children are referred to welfare homes bypassing the jail.

== The child victims ==
Amnesty International stated that Filipino children who come into conflict with the law are often from marginalized groups including street youth, drug users, and those with interrupted education, who have limited access to the family and societal structures meant to protect them. Many are fleeing difficult home situations, often exacerbated by abuse and poverty and resulting in an interrupted education.

== Indiscriminate 'rescue' operations ==
In response to widespread criticism of the government's often violent and harmful clean-up exercises, government officials in Metro Manila committed to a new initiative of 'rescuing' abused, neglected, and exploited street children, placing them in shelters where they were said to be provided with food, medical care, education, and protection. However, a 2009 report jointly published by Bahay Tuluyan and UNICEF reported that most 'rescued' street children were not only taken involuntarily and with violence, the conditions in the shelters to which they are taken are extremely poor.

== Charities ==
A number of charities are active in helping children in jail in the Philippines.

Preda Foundation visits jails on a regular basis and hands out food and medicines.

Jubilee have been active in gathering evidence and gave testimony to the Congressional Human Rights Caucus on the subject of children in prison in the Philippines.

Kids Go Free was formed to advocate for children in conflict with the law. Based on research in the Philippines the group is concerned with the situation of children in jail worldwide.

== Documentaries ==
UNICEF film Bunso about children in jail won a director award for Ditsi Carolino at the 2005 One World documentary films festival in Prague, Czech Republic.

- Kids Behind Bars

== See also ==
- Child labour in the Philippines
- Human rights in the Philippines
