= Labor policy in the Philippines =

Laws to address Filipino workers' rights

The labor policy in the Philippines is primarily defined by the Labor Code of the Philippines and other related labor laws. As of 2025, these laws apply to approximately 38 million Filipinos who are part of the labor force, including, to some extent, overseas workers. They are intended to establish the legal rights of workers and set limitations concerning the hiring process, working conditions, employee benefits, labor policymaking within companies, and employer-employee relations.

The Labor Code and other labor legislation are implemented mainly by government agencies, including the Department of Labor and Employment and the Department of Migrant Workers (formerly the Philippine Overseas Employment Administration). Non-governmental entities, such as trade unions and employer organizations, also contribute to the development and enforcement of labor standards in the country.

== Labor force ==
The Philippines has one of the biggest available of qualified workers (aged 15–64) in the world in absolute terms which ranks 13th largest in the world behind countries like Vietnam, Japan, and Mexico. In 2010, the people qualified for work had reached 55.5M. As of 2011, it ranked 147th, at 61%, bordering the middle and bottom third of the world ranking, by virtue of its relatively large population of elderly and children combined.

With this large pool of available workers, the Philippines has more than 38 million people that belong to the labor force which is one of the largest in the world almost making it to the top ten notwithstanding a relatively mediocre participation rate of 64.5%. The labor force has consistently grown by an average 2% for the past three years. This labor force is dominated by people that have an educational attainment below the tertiary level which make up 71%.

== Employment ==
As of 2011, the labor force is approximately 40 million workers. As of 2020, the labor force participation rate was 57%, a relatively large percentage that belongs to the upper-third in the world ranking. The Philippines ranks relatively low in its employed worker-to-GDP ratio with only $8,260 which hints about the country's productivity issues. Nevertheless, this GDP per employed worker has been growing by an average of 3% over the last decade.

Most of these employed workers are in the field of Services (50%), followed by Agriculture (34%) and Industry (15%) with the lowest share. There has been a considerable employment growth in each of the Services and Industry sector of about 4% since 2009 while employment in the Agricultural sector has been fluctuating. A large portion of these employed workers are salary/wage workers and then followed by self-employed.

The share of the Philippine labor force employed in agriculture declined from over 40% in 1991 to less than 25% in 2019. During the same period, employment in the service sector became the largest contributor to the workforce, accounting for over 60% by 2022. The industry sector also experienced moderate growth, rising from approximately 15% in 1991 to over 20% in 2022, reflecting the country’s shift toward urbanization and industrialization. This decline in agricultural employment emphasizes the movement of labor toward service and industry-based jobs, alongside a reduction in rural-based work opportunities. These trends demonstrate the changes of the Philippine employment over time. Additionally, the share of GDP contributed by the Philippine agriculture sector declined significantly from over 25% in the 1960s to below 10% by 2022. This decrease aligns with the reduction in agricultural employment, as the economy transitioned toward industry and services. This drop shows a broad shift in the economy, where work is valued more in non-agricultural sectors.

In 2025, the Philippine government launched the Trabaho Para sa Bayan (TPB) Plan 2025–2034, a 10-year national labor and employment strategy aimed at generating quality jobs, strengthening workforce competitiveness, and aligning employment programs with long-term development goals.

== Unemployment and under-employment ==
There are about 2.7 million Filipinos that are unemployed which constitutes about 7.4% of the labor force. This is the lowest rate the Philippines enjoys since 1996, before the country suffered from the Asian Financial Crisis. After unemployment rate peaked in 2000, it has been on a steep decline by an average of 8.5% each year through to 2010. Out of this unemployed group of workers, 88% is roughly split between people who at least had a high school or a college education.

A large proportion of college graduates are nursing graduates whose numbers now sum up to about 200,000 according to a report by Philippine Nurses Association. As of 2011, it is estimated that about 7M are underemployed. It went back up after it fell in 2010 at 6.5M. Visibly underemployed people, people working less than 40 hours per week, cover 57% while the rest is made up by Invisible underemployed people, those who work over 40 hours per week but wants more hours.

== Labor issues ==
=== Lack of Security of Tenure ===
It is well-published that many employers engage in relationships other than a "regular [employment]" under an "Employer-Employee Relationship" as legally defined under the country's laws. During the administration of former President Rodrigo Duterte, an audit by the Labor Department indicated that the well-known fastfood giant Jollibee, canned fruit maker Dole Philippines, Inc. and telecommunications giant PLDT as the top 3 practitioners of what could be taken as borderline illegal employment practices. A "state workers' group" named Confederation for Unity, Recognition, and Advancement of Government Employees (COURAGE) later on added that the government itself was the number one culprit regarding this through "Contract of Service (CoS)" and/or "Job Order (JO)" types of engaging de facto employees.

=== Low wages ===
Many workers receive wages that are below what is considered a living wage. Labor groups have called for the raising of the minimum daily wage mandated by the government.

Estimates from the Japanese External Trade Organization state that as of 2023 manufacturing sector wages in the Philippines is lower than that in Singapore, Malaysia, Thailand, Indonesia, and Vietnam, while non-manufacturing sector wages is lower than that in Singapore, Malaysia, Thailand, Indonesia, Vietnam, and Cambodia.

==== Balance between workers' welfare and employment generation ====
Some businesses argue that having policies that are biased on workers’ welfare and protection may hinder employment creation. They argue that a rigid labor market due to government intervention may result in lower investments and thus, slower growth.

=== Hazardous working conditions ===
A substantial number of workers in the Philippines are exposed to hazardous working conditions and are not provided sufficient safety equipment and training. Of the country's 13.8 million workers, an estimated 17 out 18 are exposed to various safety and health hazards.

The type of hazards workers are exposed to depends on the industry they are in. Workers in construction and manufacturing, for example, tend to work with electrical equipment and other dangerous tools and machinery, while those in agriculture are frequently exposed to toxic pesticides and fertilizers.

=== Maltreatment of migrant workers ===
Many Filipino migrant workers have experienced abuse, exploitation, or human trafficking. In 2020, almost 5,000 cases of maltreatment of overseas Filipino workers (OFWs) were recorded by Philippine Overseas Labor Offices.

=== Attacks on labor unions and labor union activists ===
==== Red-tagging of labor unions ====
The Philippine government has labeled labor union members as communists or terrorists, an accusation that puts groups and individuals at risk of violence and harassment. Red-tagging hampers workers right to organize and threatens labor rights in the Philippines. The Commission on Human Rights spoke out against the practice and said that red-tagging goes against the presumption of innocence, violates labor organizers' human rights, and threatens labor groups' safety and freedoms.

==== Extrajudicial killings of labor activists ====
Labor and peasant leaders, activists, Indigenous peoples, religious workers, and environmentalists have been victims of extrajudicial killings in the Philippines. Human rights groups have attributed some of the killings to the military, police, or government-backed militias. Few of the killings have been investigated or end in the conviction of killers. In 2023, the International Labour Organization (ILO) pushed for government action on the killing of 70 labor union organizers, abductions, and other possible violations of ILO Convention 87 on the protection of workers rights to freedom of association and collective bargaining.

=== Labor productivity ===
Total factor productivity (TFP), the efficiency in use of both labor and capital, is important because labor income depends on labor productivity growth. This growth is the average product of labor which correlates with labor's contribution to enterprise revenue and profits. Improvements in workers’ real wages and earnings is related to labor productivity growth and not exactly to employment growth. Improvements in real wages, improves the poverty incidence of the people thus helping in poverty reduction. Canlas, Aldaba, Esguerra argues that policymakers should have a good understanding of the sources of TFP because sustainable growth comes from rising TFP growth. "One key factor is educated labor, which has the capacity to invent, innovate, and master new techniques." At the long run, it is important to educate the population and invest in human development and research and development to improve TFP. Canlas, Aldaba, Esguerra advise that to raise TFP growth, monetary policy and fiscal policy should stabilize a predictable environment for the private sector.

=== Underemployment, overseas employment ===
With the declining earnings, people are looking for additional hours of work (underemployed), or going abroad (overseas employment) or choose to be self-employed. This also shows how they are not content with the quality of employment. The self-employed are actually indifferent between the wage employment and self-employment that they decided to be on their own. This makes them, together with the unpaid family workers, part of the vulnerable employment and its earnings is weak compared to the wage one. On the other hand, they can be overseas Filipino workers. In 2009, it was reported that 1.423 million Filipinos were deployed overseas. This mitigates the unemployment problem but also poses moral hazard problems, reducing labor force participation in the family.

=== Youth unemployment, job and skill mismatch, educated unemployed ===
In 2010, half of the 2.9 million unemployed Filipinos were age 15–24. More than half of the unemployed youth are stuck due to lack of job opportunities, lack of skills and the competition with older ones. This lack of training and skills and incompetence may be due to poor education. On the other hand, there is the job and skill mismatch. Even with the high unemployment rate, there are jobs that are not filled because there are no applicants who have the right qualifications. From this job mismatch problem also arises the educated unemployed. In 2010, the unemployment rate among the college educated is about 11%. Some have difficulty in finding an appropriate job for the degree they have. Others, on the other hand, have higher reservation wages and can afford to wait for better opportunities.

== Labor Code of the Philippines ==
The Labor Code of the Philippines is the primary statute governing employment practices and labor relations in the Philippines. It establishes the rules and standards relating to employment, including pre-employment requirements, conditions of labor, wage rates, hours of work, employee benefits, and procedures for the termination of employment. The Code was promulgated on May 1, 1974, during the administration of President Ferdinand Marcos, and came into effect on November 1, 1974, six months after its promulgation.

=== Pre-employment policies ===
==== Minimum employable age ====
The minimum age for employment is 15 years old for non-hazardous environments, and 18 for hazardous ones. Persons below that age are not allowed to be employed unless they are working directly under their parent's supervision or are working with family members.

==== Overseas employment ====
As for overseas employment of Filipinos, foreign employers are not allowed to directly hire Philippine nationals except through board and entities authorized by the Philippine Overseas Employment Administration. Travel agencies also cannot transact or help in any transactions for the employment or placement of Filipino workers abroad, except for the provision of passage (air or ship tickets), after all legalities had been fulfilled by & through the relevant government agencies.

=== Regulation on conditions of employment ===
==== Minimum wage rate ====
Minimum wage rates in the Philippines vary from region to region, with regional wage boards established for each region to monitor economic activity and adjust minimum wages based on growth rates, unemployment rates, and other factors. The Wage Rationalization Act, or Republic Act 6727, was enacted in 1989 and it is the ruling law regarding minimum wage rates. It established the National Wages and Productivity Commission which has supervision over Regional Tripartite Wages and Productivity Boards, which ultimately decide on minimum wage rates. As of July 2024, the highest minimum wage rate is in Metro Manila, set at ₱645 daily non-agricultural wage rate, while the lowest, as of February 2024, is in the Bangsamoro Autonomous Region in Muslim Mindanao, at ₱336 daily non-agricultural wage rate.

==== Regular work hours and rest periods ====
Normal Hours of Work. — The maximum normal hours of work for any employee shall not exceed eight (8) hours per day.

Health personnel employed in cities and municipalities with a population of at least one million (1,000,000), or in hospitals and clinics with a bed capacity of at least one hundred (100), are required to observe regular office hours of eight (8) hours per day, five (5) days per week, exclusive of meal periods. However, when the exigencies of the service necessitate a work schedule of six (6) days or forty-eight (48) hours per week, such personnel shall be entitled to an additional compensation of not less than thirty percent (30%) of their regular wage for work performed on the sixth day. For the purposes of this provision, health personnel refers to resident physicians, nurses, nutritionists, dietitians, pharmacists, social workers, laboratory technicians, paramedical technicians, psychologists, midwives, attendants, and other hospital or clinic staff.

Meal Periods. — Employers are required to provide their employees with a meal period of not less than sixty (60) minutes, subject to such regulations as may be prescribed by the Secretary of Labor.

==== Rest days ====
Weekly Rest Periods. — Every employee is entitled to a rest period of at least twenty-four (24) consecutive hours after six (6) consecutive days of work. The employer is responsible for determining and scheduling the employee’s rest day, except when the employee requests a different day on the basis of religious grounds.

An employer may, however, require an employee to work on the scheduled rest day in cases of emergency, in situations where the employee’s services are indispensable, in order to prevent loss or damage to goods or property, or under other circumstances justified by reasonable grounds.

==== Nightshift differential and overtime ====
Night Shift Differential. — Employees required to work during the night shift, defined as the period from 10:00 p.m. to 6:00 a.m., are entitled to receive not less than ten percent (10%) of their regular wage rate in addition to their basic pay for each hour of work performed within this period.

Overtime Work. — Work performed beyond the normal eight (8) hours per day is considered overtime. Employees engaged in overtime work are entitled to their regular wage plus an additional compensation of at least twenty-five percent (25%) of the regular hourly rate. In cases where overtime work is performed on a holiday or scheduled rest day, the additional compensation shall be at least thirty percent (30%) of the regular hourly rate..

==== Household helpers ====
Household helpers, or maids, are common in the Philippines. Household helpers deliver services at the employer's home, attending to the employer's instructions and convenience. The minimum wage of household helpers is P800 per month for some cities in Metro Manila, while a lower wage is paid to those outside of Metro Manila,. However, most household helpers receive more than the minimum wage; employers usually give wages ranging from P2,500 and above per month. On top of that, employers are required to provide food, sanitary lodging, and just treatment to the household helper.

=== Post-employment ===
==== Termination by employer ====
The employer has the right to terminate an employee due to the following reasons: serious misconduct or disobedience to the employer, neglect of duties or commission of a crime by the employee, and such gives the employer a just cause to terminate the services of the employee.

==== Retirement ====
The retirement age for an employee depends on the employment contract. Upon retirement, the retired employee should be given his/her benefits according to the agreement or contract between the employer and the employee. However, if there is no existing retirement plan or agreement for the employee, he/she may retire at the age of 60, given that he/she has served the employer for 5 years, and shall be given a retirement pay of at least half a month's salary for every year of service (6 months of work given is considered as 1 whole year for the retirement pay).

== Labor market institutions ==
=== Government ===
The Philippine government greatly affects the labor market through its policies and interventions. It plays a role in job creation through generating a formidable environment for investment; in ensuring the workers’ welfare through policies like the Labor Code; in improving the education of the labor; in informing regarding the jobs available to match the skills of the people; in implementing expansionary fiscal and monetary policies to reduce unemployment rate.

==== Department of Labor and Employment ====
Founded on December 8, 1933, the Department of Labor and Employment is the government agency overseeing the labor market of the Philippines. It is tasked to implement the Labor Code and other labor and employment-related policies of the government. They have different programs for job generation, skills training for workers, job fairs and placements, for overseas workers, and others that helps enhance the labor market of the Philippines.

==== Bureau of Labor and Employment Statistics ====
Under the Department of Labor and Employment, the Bureau of Labor and Employment Statistics gathers data and research regarding the labor market. These statistics are important in making sound policies (Aldaba, Canlas, Esguerra). One example of data is that regarding job vacancies. One reason of vacancies in spite of unemployment is that people do not know where to look for the right job. The bureau gathers information on vacancies and applicants and submit this to the department for dissemination.

==== Technical Education and Skills Development Authority ====
The Technical Education and Skills Development Authority, under the supervision of Department of Labor and Employment, is the government agency mandated to oversee the development of technical education and skills development of the labor force of the Philippines. The authority aims to train skilled workers especially on technical and vocational services.

==== Philippine Overseas Employment Agency ====
The Philippine Overseas Employment Agency is the Department of Labor and Employment's arm that administers to the overseas employment of Filipino workers. It aims to ensure and protect the migrant workers' rights and welfare. It is also tasked to promote, develop and supervise the government's overseas employment program.

=== Labor unions ===
Trade or labor unions in the Philippines are organizations sanctioned by Labor Code of the Philippines as an acknowledgment of Filipino workers' freedom to self-organize. Trade unions aim to promote enlightenment among Filipino workers concerning their wages, hour of work, and other legal rights. They aim to raise awareness on their obligations as union members and employees, as well. Moreover, they serve as legitimate entities that negotiate with employers in policy-making with regard to terms and conditions of employment. These negotiations formally take place in the process of collective bargaining agreement.

Trade unions are granted with a right to go on a strike, a temporary stoppage of work by the employees when there is a labor dispute. Labor disputes are defined as situation when there are controversies surrounding negotiations and arranging of the terms and condition of employment. The union, however, must file a notice of strike or the employer must file a notice of lockout to the Department of Labor and Employment. But when a strike or lockout is deemed to compromise national interests or interests of the Filipino public (for instance, the case of health workers), the Secretary of Labor and Employment has the authority to prohibit it and deliberately enforce resumption of regular operations.

In the Philippines, the Trade Union Congress of the Philippines is the largest union and confederation of 30 labor federations in the country which come from a wide range of sectors. As of 2009, there are a total of 34,320 unions with consist of members summing up to 2.6 million.

Other labor unions in the Philippines include the Kilusang Mayo Uno, or May First [Labor] Movement.

=== Employers' confederation ===
In the Philippines, there are employers' confederations to lobby the protection of firm owners; they also represents the business sector and employers in the country. The most widely known is the Employers' Confederation of the Philippines, touted as the voice of the employers in labor management and socioeconomic development. The Philippine Chamber of Commerce and Industry, Makati-based Makati Business Club and Management Association of the Philippines could also be seen as such.

== See also ==
- Human rights in the Philippines
- Child labor in the Philippines
