= Mindanao State University–Sultan Naga Dimaporo =

State-funded university in the Philippines

- Pamantasang Pangestado ng Mindanao sa Sultan Naga Dimaporo (Filipino)
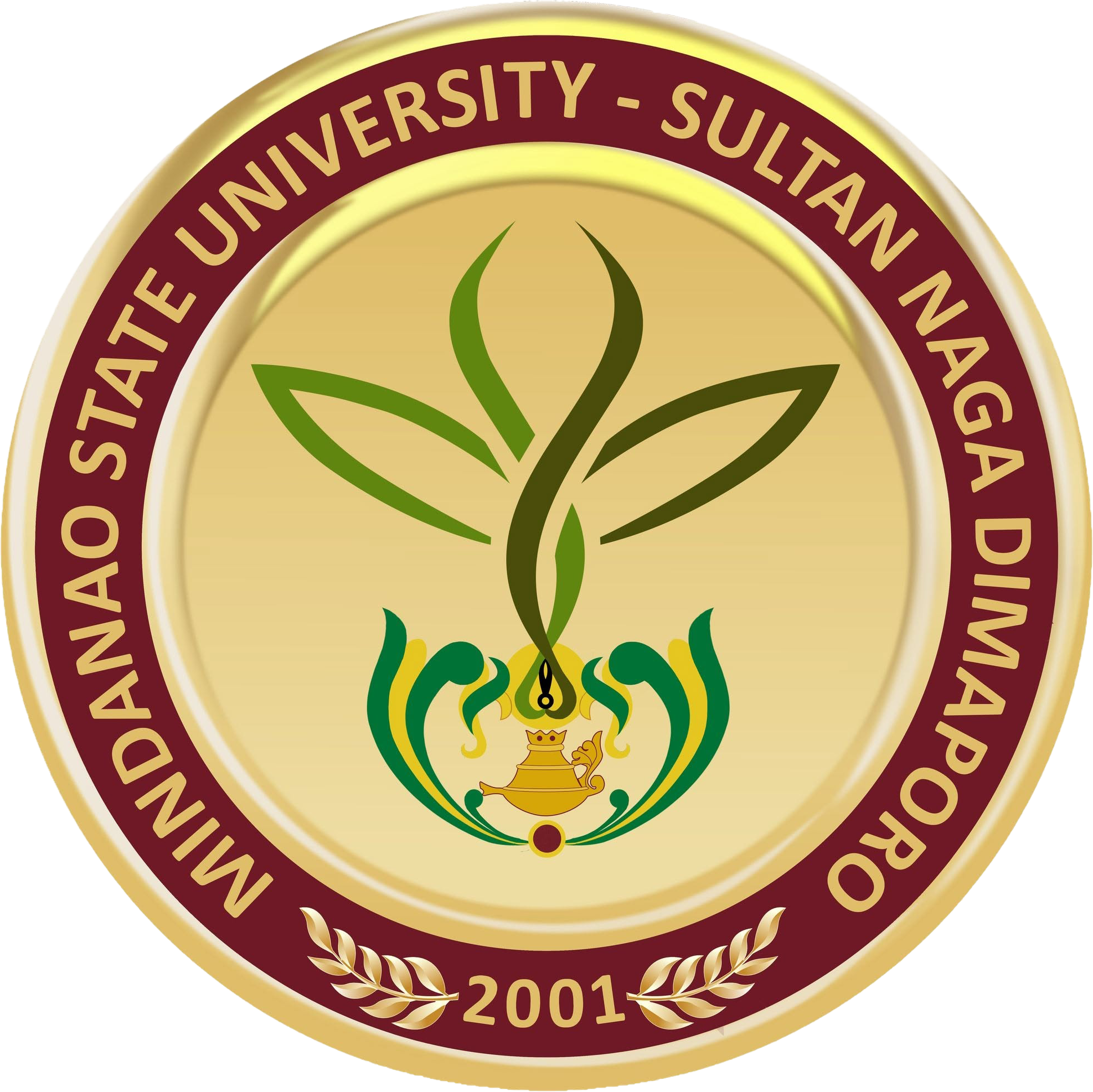
- Former name: Lanao del Norte Agricultural College (1969‑2001)
- Type: State University
- Established: 2001; 25 years ago
- Location: Sultan Naga Dimaporo, Lanao del Norte, 9215, Philippines; 7°47′29″N 123°44′04″E
- Website: msusnd.edu.ph
- Location in Mindanao Location in the Philippines

Mindanao State University–Sultan Naga Dimaporo, formally designated by legislation as the Lanao del Norte Agricultural College, is a state-funded public higher education institution located in Barangay Ramain, Sultan Naga Dimaporo, in the province of Lanao del Norte, Philippines. Operating as an integrated constituent college of the broader Mindanao State University System, the institution primarily provides tertiary education and vocational training to the populations of Mindanao, Sulu, and Palawan geographic areas. The academic focus of the college centers on agricultural sciences, teacher education, and information technology. The institution functions under a legislative mandate to extend educational access to Muslim populations and other cultural minority groups in the southern Philippines, serving as a mechanism for regional socio-economic development and national integration. Initially established as an agricultural farm school during the American colonial administration in the early twentieth century, the institution underwent several geographic relocations across the Lanao provinces, accompanied by progressive expansions of its curriculum. The school was formally converted into a tertiary college through a legislative act in 1969 and was subsequently integrated into the Mindanao State University System in 2001 in compliance with national higher education modernization policies. At present, the campus serves as a localized hub for agricultural research, regional extension services, pedagogical training, and community development, maintaining collaborative operations with local government units and national executive agencies such as the Department of Agriculture.

== History ==
=== American colonial education framework ===
The institutional lineage of Mindanao State University Sultan Naga Dimaporo originates in the early 1900s during the American colonial administration of the Philippine archipelago. The facility was initially founded as the Lumbatan Farm School, situated in the municipality of Lumbatan within the future province of Lanao del Sur. The creation of rural farm schools during this historical period was a deliberate educational policy implemented by the American colonial government. This policy aimed to introduce formalized agricultural instruction and basic vocational training to the predominantly agrarian populations of Mindanao, serving both educational and administrative pacification objectives. The inaugural administrator of the Lumbatan Farm School was an American military non-commissioned officer, Staff Sergeant Ed F. Smith, who assumed the title of Head Teacher. The assignment of military personnel to civil educational leadership roles was a standard practice in the early administrative strategies employed in the region.

The institution underwent its first major structural transition following the inauguration of the Philippine Assembly on October 16, 1907. In accordance with the legislative provisions of the Philippine Bill of 1902, the farm school was formally converted into a secondary educational facility and subsequently renamed the Lumbatan Agricultural High School. This conversion marked the institutionalization of the local educational system, expanding its scope beyond rudimentary agricultural instruction to encompass a structured high school curriculum.

The passage of the Jones Law, also known as the Philippine Autonomy Act, by the United States Congress on August 29, 1914, precipitated further modifications to the academic structure of the school. The curriculum was broadened to offer a complete secondary agricultural education program. During this formative academic period, the teaching faculty consisted entirely of American educators. Consequently, English was mandated and strictly utilized as the exclusive medium of communication and instruction within the classrooms. Under this modified secondary curriculum, Mr. Clynton C. Douglas served as the first Head Teacher. The gradual Filipinization of the civil service and the public educational system, a key objective of the Jones Law, became evident at the institution approximately one year later when Douglas was succeeded by a Filipino educator identified as Mr. Bernardo, a native of Bacolod.

=== Post-war relocations and regional shifts ===
The period following the Second World War brought substantial geographic and administrative disruptions to the institution. In 1947, under the political sponsorship and leadership of then Congressman Manalao Mindalano, the school was relocated from its original site in Lumbatan to the municipality of Malabang. During its operational tenure in Malabang, the agricultural high school did not possess an independent physical campus; instead, it shared infrastructure by occupying a designated portion of the existing Malabang Pilot Central School. This shared infrastructure arrangement in Malabang proved to be a temporary measure. In June 1953, the political dynamics of the Lanao region facilitated another significant geographic transition. Then-Congressman Mohammad Ali Dimaporo authored and successfully secured the passage of a legislative bill that mandated the transfer of the school from Malabang, to the municipality of Karomatan, in the future Lanao del Norte. The municipality of Karomatan would later renamed Sultan Naga Dimaporo. The specific site chosen for the new campus was located in the Ramain Valley. The acquisition of this permanent site was achieved through the direct contribution of the local community, as the required land was formally donated by prominent native Iranun residents of Karomatan. This 1953 relocation firmly established the physical footprint of the institution in Lanao del Norte, anchoring its subsequent infrastructure development and academic focus to the specific agricultural environment of the Ramain Valley.

=== Conversion to a college ===
In 1969, Republic Act No. 5507 formally elevated the institution to the tertiary education level. While the statute required the institution to maintain its existing secondary agricultural curriculum, it authorized the college to offer specific collegiate degree programs. The authorized programs included a four-year technical agricultural curriculum leading to the degree of Bachelor of Science in Agriculture, a four-year teacher education curriculum leading to the degree of Bachelor of Science in Agricultural Education, and a two-year technical agriculture curriculum leading to the title of Associate in Agriculture. Section 3 of the act defined the initial governance structure of the college. It stipulated that the institution would be led by a Superintendent of Agricultural Instruction and would operate under the direct administrative supervision of the Bureau of Vocational Education. Furthermore, the statute granted the superintendent direct administrative and supervisory authority over all other agricultural schools located within the province of Lanao del Norte that fell under the jurisdiction of the Bureau of Vocational Education. Although the legal conversion was enacted in 1969, administrative preparations delayed the practical implementation of the tertiary curricula, with the first college-level courses officially commencing in 1971.

=== Integration into the Mindanao State University System ===
During the late 1990s, the Philippine government introduced comprehensive reforms to the higher education sector, significantly altering the administrative status of independent state-funded colleges. Republic Act No. 8292, known as the Higher Education Modernization Act of 1997, provided a statutory framework for the rationalization and modernization of tertiary education. Working in conjunction with Republic Act No. 7722, which created the Commission on Higher Education, and Republic Act No. 8760, which served as the General Appropriation Act of FY 2000, these legislative instruments mandated that smaller institutions supervised by the Commission on Higher Education be integrated into proximate state universities to optimize resource allocation. On February 13, 2001, the Board of Regents of the Mindanao State University System approved the formal integration of three supervised institutions. Pursuant to Board of Regents Resolution No. 11-A, series of 2001, the Lanao del Norte Agricultural College was officially absorbed into the Mindanao State University System, adopting the designation of Mindanao State University Lanao del Norte Agricultural College. The college was integrated alongside two other provincial institutions: the Lanao National College of Arts and Trades located in Marawi City, and the Maigo School of Arts and Trades located in the municipality of Maigo, Lanao del Norte. The integration process was driven by three primary policy objectives defined by the national higher education administration. These objectives were the promotion of quality education through the application of standardized university metrics, the rationalization of tertiary education to prevent overlapping academic program offerings within specific geographic regions, and the maximization of limited government financial resources through centralized administrative oversight.

As a constituent unit of the Mindanao State University System, the college operates under the overarching systemic mandate originally established by Republic Act 1387. In alignment with this systemic framework, the localized vision of Mindanao State University–Sultan Naga Dimaporo is to function as a center of excellence and development in agriculture and related academic disciplines. Its articulated institutional mission focuses on providing quality instruction and practical training in agriculture, teacher education, computer science, and information technology. The primary goals of the campus include undertaking the traditional university functions of instruction, research, and extension, providing a trained agricultural workforce for the region, generating location-specific technologies to improve the agri-based economy of Lanao del Norte, and delivering advanced farming knowledge to cultural minorities to elevate local standards of living.

== Governance Structure and Administration ==
=== System-wide governance ===
The governance and corporate powers of the entire Mindanao State University System are vested exclusively in the Board of Regents and the President of the University, as defined by the original university charter and subsequent legislative amendments. The system administration, headquartered at the main campus, is responsible for the formulation, planning, control, monitoring, coordination, and integration of system-wide policies, academic programs, and operational standards.

=== Campus-level administration ===
While the university system maintains centralized policy control and fiscal oversight, the constituent colleges operate within a decentralized administrative framework that grants a necessary degree of localized operational autonomy. Unlike the larger constituent universities within the system which are headed by Chancellors, the integrated constituent colleges are administered by officials holding the title of Campus Head or Superintendent.

Mindanao State University–Sultan Naga Dimaporo is led by a Vocational School Superintendent II, who serves as the executive Campus Head. This leadership position oversees the daily operations, strategic direction, and academic execution at the Ramain campus. The campus administration includes specialized administrative divisions designed to manage specific institutional functions. The Office of the Dean of Instruction, previously headed by officials such as Dr. Eliza Egos Redondo, oversees academic affairs, curriculum implementation, and faculty performance. The Office of Administration and Finance manages budgetary allocations, logistical support, and the maintenance of the physical plant. Furthermore, the campus integrates a National Service Training Program and an active Reserve Officers Training Corps unit. The military instruction and civic efficiency training provided by the ROTC unit, historically involving personnel, are aimed at developing potential community leaders and preparing enlisted reservists for the Armed Forces of the Philippines.

== Colleges, academic programs, and course offerings ==
The academic structure of Mindanao State University–Sultan Naga Dimaporo is organized into discrete academic departments that reflect its foundational legislative history and its contemporary institutional mission. The curriculum remains deeply rooted in the agricultural sciences while having expanded significantly into pedagogical training and technological studies to meet the specific labor demands of the Northern Mindanao region.

=== Agricultural Sciences and related fields ===
In alignment with its foundational mandate derived from Republic Act 5507, the institution maintains a comprehensive focus on agricultural education. The agricultural programs are structured to equip students with theoretical knowledge in the biological sciences alongside practical skills in farm management, crop science, and livestock handling. The curriculum emphasizes sustainable agricultural practices and the generation of location-specific technologies suitable for the climate, soil types, and topography of the Lanao del Norte province. Academic offerings in this domain lead to the degree of Bachelor of Science in Agriculture. Within this degree program, students typically engage with specialized coursework encompassing crop production, agronomy, zoology, animal husbandry, and introductory agricultural engineering. The institution also offers coursework in forestry, aligning with regional conservation efforts and sustainable resource management. These programs prepare graduates for professional careers in farm administration, agricultural extension work, agribusiness management, and rural development.

=== Teacher education ===
The College of Education functions as an academic pillar of the institution, operating with the specific goal of producing highly qualified educators for both the elementary and secondary education sectors4. The core program offerings include the Bachelor of Elementary Education and the Bachelor of Secondary Education. Students enrolled in the secondary education track are required to select specific areas of specialization. The college offers major concentrations in core academic subjects, specifically Mathematics, English, and Filipino. The pedagogical training at the campus is highly contextualized, integrating principles of inclusive education and peace studies. This approach is designed to prepare future teachers to operate effectively and sensitively within the culturally diverse, multi-religious, and historically complex environment of the Mindanao region. The education programs also emphasize the development of communication skills and the integration of educational technology into classroom instruction.

=== Information Technology and Future academic offerings ===
To address the requirements of the modern digital economy and the increasing reliance on digital infrastructure in rural areas, the institution has incorporated Computer and Information Technology into its academic portfolio. This integration aims to produce graduates capable of managing local information systems, developing software solutions for regional enterprises, and bridging the digital divide in marginalized communities.

The campus administration continuously assesses regional economic indicators to propose relevant curricular expansions. In direct coordination with the provincial government of Lanao del Norte, the campus administration has initiated strategic planning for the establishment of a Bachelor of Science in Fisheries program. This proposed degree program is specifically intended to address the productivity challenges and technical knowledge gaps faced by local fisherfolk operating in the coastal municipalities of Lanao del Norte and the adjacent Illana Bay area. Concurrent with the fisheries initiative is the conceptualization of a Halal Training Center. This proposed center aligns with the regional economic strategy to develop the Halal industry and ensure local compliance with standardized Islamic dietary and production protocols, thereby opening new market opportunities for local agricultural producers.

== Research contributions and Academic publications ==
The faculty and student researchers at the institution actively engage in academic inquiries that address local pedagogical challenges, agricultural innovations, and administrative efficiencies. Their empirical findings have been documented in peer-reviewed journals and academic repositories, demonstrating a commitment to applied research.

=== Research in educational technology and pedagogy ===
The integration of artificial intelligence and digital writing tools into language instruction represents a significant area of research within the College of Education.

=== Educational data mining and Administrative research ===
To address institutional challenges regarding student recruitment, retention, and campus logistics, researchers have applied advanced data mining techniques and systems engineering to educational administration.

=== Peace education and Social sciences ===
As an educational institution embedded within a region historically affected by socio-political conflict, the implementation of peace education is a critical academic imperative.

=== Agricultural extension and Organic technologies ===
Faculty researchers at the college actively document, validate, and promote sustainable agricultural practices developed within the region. A notable academic publication documented the organic agriculture technologies and systems developed by local farmers. The research highlighted the practical innovations of local agricultural practitioners. A specific case study focused on a former conventional farmer in Barangay Pandanan, Sultan Naga Dimaporo, who successfully transitioned to organic methods. The research detailed his formulation of a natural botanical pesticide concoction, initially called Bulay-Bulay and subsequently renamed MARVIC. The researchers meticulously documented the formulation process, which utilized indigenous and readily available botanical ingredients including garlic (Allium sativum), ginger, red onion (Allium cepa), hot pepper, kalachuchi bark (Plumeria spp.), vinegar, and coconut milk. By scientifically validating and formally publishing these grassroots technological adaptations, the college facilitates the broader diffusion of sustainable, low-cost organic farming techniques across the regional agricultural sector. The institution's faculty also investigates the socio-cultural aspects of environmental management, evidenced by research on the cultural solidity of local residents towards solid waste disposal management.

== Institutional initiatives ==
=== Agricultural development grants and facilities ===
Recognizing the college's statutory role in regional economic development, national government agencies frequently select the campus as a primary conduit for agricultural modernization projects. In February 2022, the Department of Agriculture Regional Field Office 10, in direct collaboration with the college administration, inaugurated the Sa-Goat Kita Multiplier Breeder Farm Project. Funded with an appropriation of five million Philippine pesos under the Bayanihan 2 Act via the National Livestock Program, the facility was established directly on the Ramain campus. The grant provided the institution with high-quality goat breeders, modern farm housing facilities, specialized veterinary supplies, and equipment. The project serves a highly integrated dual purpose. It acts as an active multiplier farm designed to distribute improved genetic livestock to local farmers in Lanao del Norte, and it functions as a practical instructional laboratory for agriculture students and faculty. Local stakeholders, including barangay officials, noted that the breeder farm not only stimulates the local livestock economy but also provides direct nutritional benefits to the surrounding community through the production and distribution of fresh goat milk. To further enhance the institution's agricultural research capacity, regional agricultural directors committed additional resources to the campus, including the provision of cattle for expanded breeding programs, as well as sorghum seeds, corn seeds, and coconut seedlings to support diversified crop research.

=== Food security and Community extension services ===
The college actively translates its theoretical agricultural expertise into immediate community intervention through aggressive regional extension programs. In late 2021, to combat local food insecurity exacerbated by global economic disruptions and pandemic-related supply chain issues, the institution partnered with the Department of Agriculture's national Plant, Plant, Plant Program. The college received comprehensive provisions of assorted vegetable seeds designed to scale up urban gardening initiatives and improve local food sufficiency levels. The distribution included seventy packets of diverse seed variants categorized by their specific culinary and dietary applications. These included garden salad varieties such as lettuce, tomato, and cucumber; chopsuey varieties such as pechay, radish, carrots, and cauliflower; sinigang varieties such as kangkong, pole sitao, and okra; and pinakbet varieties such as eggplant, ampalaya, and squash. The campus administration utilized these resources to initiate inter-departmental gardening competitions, effectively integrating practical food production methodologies with student life and environmental awareness. Furthermore, the institution serves as a critical node for establishing regional agricultural industry standards. The college actively participated in the Regional Halal Consultation organized by the Agricultural Training Institute. By engaging directly with the National Meat Inspection Service and various local government units, the faculty contributed to documenting existing Halal implementation practices within the region. The institution assisted in outlining the rigorous procedures required for establishing Halal-compliant Learning Sites for Agriculture and participated in the development of specialized training modules for manual and mechanically assisted dhabihah, the prescribed Islamic slaughtering method. These consultations position the college at the forefront of the emerging Halal industry in Northern Mindanao, aligning academic instruction with specialized cultural market demands and regional economic strategies.
