= Orlan Calayag =

Filipino agricultural official

Orlan Agbin Calayag

Administrator of the National Food Authority
- In office January 17, 2013 – May 8, 2014
- President: Benigno Aquino III
- Preceded by: Angelito Banayo
- Succeeded by: Arthur Juan

Personal details
- Born: July 22, 1974 (age 52) San Pablo, Laguna, Philippines
- Citizenship: Philippines; United States (2009–2013)
- Education: Manuel Enverga University; De La Salle University

Orlan Agbin Calayag (born July 22, 1974) is a Filipino politician, who is currently serving as Mayor of Dolores, Quezon. Formerly the administrator of the Philippines' National Food Authority (NFA), he was later appointed the Assistant Secretary for Project Planning & Development at the Department of Agriculture.

Calayag grew up in the Philippines before emigrating to the United States, then later returned to the Philippines and became the NFA's head on the recommendation of Secretary of Agriculture Proceso Alcala. As NFA head, Calayag faced controversy and calls to step down in response to rising rice prices during his term, and in particular an April 2013 decision to import rice from Vietnam at a price which political opponents alleged was well above the market price at the time. He continued in the position until May 2014. During his term, the price of NFA rice rose from 18 pesos per kilo to 32 pesos per kilo.

== Personal life and early career ==
Calayag was born in San Pablo, Laguna to Nemesio Amat Calayag and Mauricia Bunquin Agbin in 1974. He graduated from Manuel Enverga University in Lucena City, and later moved to Washington state in the United States, where he completed a real estate professional course at the Rockwell Institute. Afterwards, he held a variety of jobs, including patient services specialist at the Swedish Medical Center, loan officer at the Bank of America, auditor of the Bellevue Sheraton Hotel, and customer relationship manager at KeyBank. He became a U.S. citizen in 2009. He also worked as a congressional aide for Proceso Alcala. He later moved back to the Philippines.

Shortly after regaining Philippine citizenship, Calayag renounced U.S. citizenship under the procedures set by the U.S. government. In August 2013, a notice confirming his loss of citizenship appeared in the U.S. government's Quarterly Publication of Individuals Who Have Chosen to Expatriate. He also began pursuing a Master's of Business Administration at De La Salle University in Manila.

== As head of the National Food Authority ==
=== Appointment ===
On January 17, 2013, Calayag was appointed as NFA administrator ad interim to serve out the remaining six months of the term of Angelito Banayo, who resigned from the post to contest the May 2013 House of Representatives mid-term elections. Proceso Alcala, who had been appointed head of the Department of Agriculture, convinced Calayag to take up the post, and recommended him to President Benigno Aquino III.

After Calayag's first term ended, he was re-appointed to the post on July 12. The Philippines is a net importer of rice; amidst a wider trend of governments in the Asia-Pacific region increasing their emergency grain stocks to guard against a repeat of panic-buying seen during the 2007–08 world food price crisis, Calayag indicated that the Philippines was aiming for self-sufficiency in food rather than continuing imports, and would invest in expansion and improvement of grain storage facilities.

=== Rice importation controversy ===
Nevertheless, Calayag also made the decision to import 187,000 metric tons of rice, and invited tenders from firms in ASEAN member countries; among them, only Thailand and Vietnam submitted bids, and so the NFA awarded the rice import contract to Vietnam's Southern Food Corp. This decision would prove controversial. Lawyer and political activist Argee Guevarra, a member of Sanlakas, was one of the early voices of criticism against Calayag. Guevarra made accusations of overpricing, stating in August 2013 that the P19,762 per metric ton price the NFA had paid for the rice was above both the Oryza Global Rice Price index for the period in question, as well as the prevailing Vietnamese market price of P15,480 per metric ton.

As the controversy drew on, Guevarra also questioned whether Calayag was eligible to hold the position of head of the NFA, as its charter required that administrators be natural-born Philippine citizens; it was not clear whether Calayag's re-acquisition of Philippine citizenship under Republic Act 9225 and subsequent renunciation of U.S. citizenship would fall under this definition. A statement from the Office of the Executive Secretary responded that Calayag "has met all the qualifications necessary to hold his current position". A number of lawmakers urged Calayag to step down, including Speaker Feliciano Belmonte, Jr. and Carlos Zarate (of Bayan Muna), and Fernando Hicap (of Anakpawis). Hicap criticized Calayag's track record at the NFA, noting that the price of rice had risen to P40 to P45 per kilo under his tenure.

Guevarra became more vocal in his accusations, filing a plunder complaint against Calayag with the Office of the Ombudsman, and accusing Calayag and his boss Alcala of "coddling smugglers" and being part of a "Quezon mafia".

=== Remainder of term ===
During the rest of his tenure, Calayag worked to improve the agency's financial position and increase procurement volumes. On May 5, 2014, organizational restructuring ordered by President Aquino reassigned the National Food Authority, the Philippine Coconut Authority, the National Irrigation Administration, and the Fertilizer and Pesticide Authority from the Department of Agriculture to the Office of the President, with Francis Pangilinan given oversight responsibilities for the four agencies in the newly created post of Presidential Assistant for Food Security and Agricultural Modernization. Calayag and PCA administrator Euclides G. Forbes then both chose to step down from their respective positions on May 8 in order to allow Pangilinan to appoint his own preferred candidates to head the agencies. Former San Miguel Foods president Arthur Juan was appointed to succeed Calayag in June 2014.

== As Agriculture Assistant Secretary ==
After his stint at the National Food Authority, Alcala appointed Calayag as Assistant Secretary for Project Planning and Development in mid-2014.
