= Bureau of Agricultural Research =

Filipino government agency

- Kawanihan ng Pananaliksik sa Agrikultura

Agency overview
- Formed: January 30, 1987
- Headquarters: RDMIC Building, Visayas Avenue corner Elliptical Road, Vasra, Quezon City 1104, Philippines; 14°39′17″N 121°02′52″E
- Annual budget: ₱1.17 billion Php (2018)
- Agency executive: Joell H. Lales, RAgr, MTM, OIC-Director
- Parent agency: Department of Agriculture
- Website: www.bar.gov.ph

The Bureau of Agricultural Research (BAR; Filipino: Kawanihan ng Pananaliksik sa Agrikultura) is an agency of the Philippine government under the Department of Agriculture responsible for ensuring that all agricultural research is coordinated and undertaken for maximum utility to agriculture.

== History ==
In 1901, the United States Philippine Commission created the Insular Bureau of Agriculture under the Department of Interior. The Bureau was given the following mandate:

“to conduct investigations and disseminate useful information with reference to the agricultural resources of the Philippine Islands, the methods of cultivation at present in vogue and their improvement, the practicability of introducing new and valuable agricultural products, the introduction of new domesticated animals, and improvement of the breeds of domesticated animals now found in the Islands”.

In 1916, the Philippine Legislature reorganized the government creating the Department of Agriculture and Natural Resources (DANR), replacing the Bureau of Agriculture.

In 1953, the Bureau of Agricultural Extension was created under the DANR.

On September 26, 1972, the first decree promulgated by then President Ferdinand Marcos was for the reorganization of the Executive Branch of the Government. For DANR, no major changes took place except for the further expansion of the department.

The first serious attempt to integrate research, development, and extension activities in agriculture and fisheries by the government was done by President Corazon Aquino in 1986 when under the Freedom Constitution she issued Executive Order 116 reorganizing the Ministry of Agriculture and Food.

Under this executive order, the government addressed the lack of coordination and integration of agriculture research and development among the existing bureaus, councils, and agencies by creating the Research, Training, and Extension Group.

BAR's specific mandate to coordinate agricultural research was affirmed by Executive Order 292, otherwise known as the Administrative Code of 1987.

The Bureau of Agricultural Research (BAR) was created by virtue of Executive Order 116 signed in 1987. It is mandated to ensure that agricultural research are coordinated and undertaken for maximum utility to agriculture. The EO requires the Bureau to tap farmers, farmers’ organizations and research institutions especially state colleges and universities (SCUs) in the conduct of research for use by the Department of Agriculture (DA) and its clientele.

The Agriculture and Fisheries Modernization Act of 1997 or AFMA (Republic Act 8435) and Executive Orders 127 (1999) and 338 (2001) affirmed and strengthened the role of BAR in the management of agriculture and fisheries Research and Development (R&D) in the Philippines. The AFMA law and the Executive Orders mandate BAR to orchestrate, consolidate and strengthen the National Research and Development System for Agriculture and Fisheries (NaRDSAF).

On November 3, 2020, Dr. Vivencio R. Mamaril took over as the next BAR Director.

On November 3, 2021, Dr. Junel B. Soriano officially assumed the position of BAR Director, replacing Dr. Vivencio R. Mamaril.

On August 15, 2022, Dr. Sailila E. Abdula was designated as the OIC-Director of the Bureau, replacing Dr. Soriano.

Dr. Abdula was then replaced by Joell H. Lales as the OIC-Director of the Bureau on October 24, 2022.

== Eight-Point Strategy ==
In the pursuit of its vision and mandate, BAR is guided by the following strategies:

1. Allocate resources for the conduct of applied and on-farm researches (OFRs) following the farming systems perspective to fast track technology promotion and adoption creating immediate impact on the lives of farmers and fisherfolk. Collaborative researches will be enhanced between DA research implementing units and agricultural colleges and universities.
2. Foster cooperation with other government line agencies and active partnership with the LGUs, NGOs, POs and other concerned institutions in the regional level specifically on the planning and implementation of Community-Based Participatory Action Research (CPAR) and technology commercialization activities.
3. Support research and development projects with direct bearing on the development of small and medium enterprises; more importantly focusing on the income-generating capabilities of resource-poor farmers and fisherfolk. Further, rural-urban linkage on agriculture will be studied.
4. Develop and strengthen collaboration among existing R&D systems at the national and local levels to enhance sustained growth in agriculture, strengthening the convergence initiative.
5. Develop and strengthen the DA R&D's capability on human resource and infrastructure.
6. Strengthen planning and implementation of an integrated and unified agriculture and fisheries R&D agenda and program for increased effectiveness and efficiency.
7. Develop mechanisms using information and communication technology (ICT), and conventional means to enhance sharing and exchange of relevant information and technologies to fast track decision-making and technology adoption and commercialization.
8. Advocate policies that promote sustained growth in agriculture and fisheries including strategies on increasing R&D investments.
