= BSWM =

BSWM may refer to:

- Black Skin, White Masks, a 1952 book
- Bureau of Soils and Water Management, an agency of the Philippine government
