= Lito Banayo =

Filipino politician, campaign strategist and political analyst

Angelito Tan Banayo
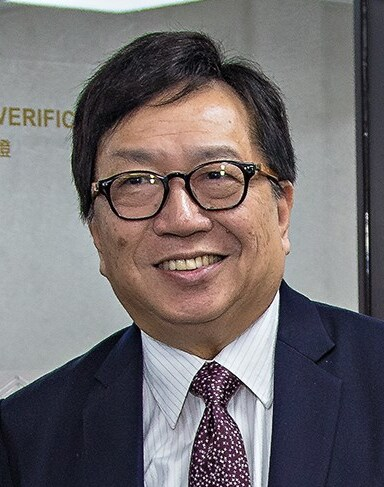
- Banayo in 2018

7th Philippine Representative to Taiwan
- In office June 30, 2016 – June 30, 2022
- President: Rodrigo Duterte
- Preceded by: Amadeo R. Perez, Jr.
- Succeeded by: Silvestre Bello III

Administrator of the National Food Authority
- In office July 2010 – September 30, 2012
- President: Benigno Aquino III
- Preceded by: Jessup Navarro
- Succeeded by: Orlan Calayag

General Manager of the Philippine Tourism Authority
- In office June 30, 1998 – November 2000
- President: Joseph Estrada
- Preceded by: Eduardo Joaquin
- Succeeded by: Nixon Kua

Postmaster General of the Philippines
- In office March 8, 1986 – 1987
- President: Cory Aquino
- Preceded by: Roilo Golez
- Succeeded by: Roilo Golez

Personal details
- Education: Colegio de San Juan de Letran; Ateneo de Manila University; University of the Philippines Diliman

Angelito "Lito" Tan Banayo (born 1946) is a Filipino politician, government official, and political analyst with the Nationalist People's Coalition. He was appointed Chairman and Representative of the Manila Economic and Cultural Office, the de facto embassy of the Philippines in Taiwan, by President Rodrigo Duterte on June 30, 2016. Formerly the Postmaster General under Cory Aquino and then head of the Philippine Tourism Authority during the Joseph Estrada administration, he later became administrator of the National Food Authority under Secretary of Agriculture Proceso Alcala during the presidency of Benigno Aquino III. He resigned from the latter post in September 2012 to run for the House of Representatives, but then withdrew from the race in December of that same year.

He served as the campaign manager for politicians such as Panfilo Lacson in 2004, Noynoy Aquino in 2010 and Isko Moreno's presidential campaign in 2022.

== Personal life ==
Banayo grew up in Butuan, Agusan del Norte, where his family had moved in the 1960s. He studied economics at the Colegio de San Juan de Letran in Manila, and then went on to the Ateneo Graduate School of Business and the University of the Philippines College of Public Administration.

== Career ==
=== As postmaster general ===
In the aftermath of the People Power Revolution in February 1986 which ousted President Ferdinand Marcos, incoming president Cory Aquino appointed Banayo as postmaster general, succeeding Roilo Golez who had resigned to run for the Senate in the 1987 elections. As Postmaster General, Banayo instituted reforms aimed at reducing employee pilferage, in particular installing one-way mirrors at Manila International Airport Airmail Distribution Center. He resisted calls to conduct a purge of Marcos-era employees, though he did aim to make executive cuts while expanding the number of mail carriers, mail sorters, and other base-level employees. He also investigated corruption and malfeasance as part of a "big cleanup", in some cases finding that allegations of corruption against certain people were in fact false rumors spread by political opponents, while in other cases finding genuine wrongdoing such as a mail-pilfering syndicate operating in the Ilocos and Cagayan Valley regions. Banayo was also responsible for the push to establish the Philippine Postal Corporation, a government-owned company, to replace the old Bureau of Posts. However, his predecessor Golez' Senate campaign was unsuccessful, and in July 1987 Golez was appointed back to Banayo's post.

=== Late 1990s to 2000s ===
During the Joseph Estrada administration, Banayo served as the presidential assistant for political affairs, as well as general manager of the Philippine Tourism Authority. In 2004, Banayo went on to become a columnist for the daily newspaper Malaya, a post which he held until 2010. He spoke out against murder allegations leveled at Senator Panfilo Lacson in 2010, after Lacson had fled the country for Hong Kong, where he formerly served as his campaign strategist during 2004 elections.

=== Administrator of the National Food Authority ===
Banayo was appointed to head the National Food Authority by President Benigno Aquino III, amidst accusations of over-importation by outgoing president Gloria Arroyo's administration. In response to President Aquino's complaints of rice stocks "rotting in government warehouses", he appointed a private-sector auditor to investigate the NFA's rice procurement and importation system. Banayo also called on the National Bureau of Investigation to help combat rice smuggling. By January 2011, Banayo had produced a report with his findings, alleging overpricing of rice imports during the Arroyo administration, which he submitted to Aquino for further investigation; Arroyo-era agricultural officials including Arthur Yap disputed Banayo's price data.

During the rest of his tenure, Banayo aimed to decrease the agency's role in rice importation, stating that the private sector should take the lead in this regard, and instead focus on local procurement; he would later warn of the financial dangers of the NFA "monopoly" on imports.

In 2014, the National Bureau of Investigation filed graft charges before the Ombudsman against Banayo and five others in connection with the alleged irregular rice importation program of the agency during his tenure.

=== House of Representatives campaign ===
In September 2012, Banayo resigned from his NFA post to prepare to contest the May 2013 House of Representatives mid-term elections in Agusan del Norte. Orlan Calayag was appointed to succeed him in January 2013.

In December 2012, 4 SM Agri Venture Multi-Purpose Cooperative head Simeon Sioson claimed in testimony before the Senate that Banayo and Nixon Kua had been involved in rice smuggling. At the time, Banayo had just undergone heart surgery, and did not appear at a Senate Agriculture and Food Committee hearing about the smuggling allegations; chairman Francis Pangilinan stated in media comments that the committee would schedule another hearing. He withdrew from the race at the end of his month, citing health reasons. Fellow party members denied reports that his withdrawal was related to unpopularity or the rice smuggling inquiry against him.

In February 2013, the Senate committee recommended that Banayo and Gilbert Lauengco of the NFA's special bids and awards committee be charged under the Anti-Graft and Corrupt Practices Act (R.A. 3019). Their findings were later referred to the Ombudsman of the Philippines, which by March 2014 had declined to pursue the matter further.
