= Puerto Princesa City National Science High School =

Public high school in Puerto Princesa, Philippines

Puerto Princesa City National Science High School Pambansang Mataas na Paaralang Pang-Agham ng Lungsod ng Puerto Princesa (Filipino)

Location
- Puerto Princesa City, Palawan, Philippines
- Coordinates: 9°46′51″N 118°43′49″E

Information
- Type: Public science high school
- Grades: 7 to 12 (STEM, HUMSS, ABM)

The Puerto Princesa City National Science High School (Filipino: Pambansang Mataas na Paaralang Pang-Agham ng Lungsod ng Puerto Princesa) is a public science high school located in Puerto Princesa City, Palawan, Philippines. It is a DepEd-recognized science high school.

== History ==
The establishment of this school can be traced back in 1989. In June 1990, 28 selected pioneering students started from small, borrowed, dark rooms of Puerto Princesa Pilot Elementary School. One name used during its growing years was Pilot High School (Sicsican Annex).

When the pioneering batch was about to graduate in 1994, the class President Arni P. Alanis, Rhondie Garobo and other officers with Cristina G. Buenafe defended before the Sangguniang Panglungsod to have its own identity. The name Puerto Princesa City High School was on their diplomas during commencement exercises in March 1994 as proof of support from the city government under the leadership of Hon. Edward S. Hagedorn, mayor.

The school became the champion in the first Quiz Bee sponsored by the government in 1992, the same year the government permit to operate 053 was given to the school. Former Deputy Speaker Hon. Alfredo "Amor" Abueg of the House of Representatives authored its conversion into a public science high school approved by the former President Fidel V. Ramos on March 4, 1997 by virtue of E.A. 8287.

Today, this school lies on 30,000 sq. m. lot courtesy of the city government of Puerto Princesa during the administration of Hon. Edward S. Hagedorn and the City Council, in the heart of Puerto Princesa City. It's behind the National Irrigation Administration and New City Hall at Sta. Monica, with five buildings.

This institution was nominated as Regional Science High School in November 2003 to cater to the needs of the intellectually gifted and science-inclined students of the region. Due to catchments site and in the curriculum/enrollment, it did not win. Nevertheless, another milestone in public secondary education was obtained by this school when the DepEd Bureau of Secondary Education allowed the regional science curriculum to be offered beginning SY 2004-2005. The science fair is one of the strengths of the school. During the "Pagliawan" and "Perez" era, the school earned respect in the city because of consecutive championships.ity.

This institution through its principal was selected as the only secondary school in region IV MIMAROPA for project Sterling Silver, a peer acceleration system on November 8–11, 2004 in Baguio City.
