= Orlan (disambiguation) =

Orlan is a French multi-media artist.

Orlan may also refer to:

- Orlan space suit, Russian series of spacesuits
- STC Orlan-10, Russian reconnaissance, unmanned aerial vehicle (UAV)
- Pierre Mac Orlan, French novelist and songwriter
- R. C. Orlan, American former professional baseball pitcher
- Orlan P. Whitcomb, American farmer and politician
- Orlan Calayag, Filipino politician
- Orlan-class battlecruiser, Soviet class of nuclear-powered guided-missile heavy cruisers

== See also ==
- Orlann Oliere French sprinter
