= Bureau of Agriculture and Fisheries Standards =

Government agency in the Philippines

- Kawanihan ng mga Pamantayan sa Agrikultura at Pampangisdaan
- Logo

Agency overview
- Formed: December 4, 1998
- Headquarters: BPI Compound, Visayas Avenue, Quezon City, Philippines
- Agency executive: Myer Mula, Officer in Charge–Executive Director
- Parent agency: Department of Agriculture
- Website: www.bafs.da.gov.ph

The Bureau of Agriculture and Fisheries Standards (BAFS; Filipino: Kawanihan ng mga Pamantayan sa Agrikultura at Pampangisdaan) is an agency of the Philippine government under the Department of Agriculture responsible for setting and implementing standards for fresh primary and secondary processed agricultural and fishery products.

== History ==
The Bureau of Agriculture and Fisheries Standards (BAFS) under the Department of Agriculture (DA) is based on Republic Act No. 8435 or the Agriculture and Fisheries Modernization Act enacted in December 22, 1997. The bureau was originally established as the Bureau of Agriculture and Fisheries Product Standards (BAFPS) through Administrative Order No. 7 issued on December 4, 1998.

The BAFPS is tasked to enforced certain standards in agricultural and fishery products. However in 2008, it is noted that the agency is marginalized with the bureaucracy of the DA having not received any budget from Congress.

== Function ==
The BAFS' major duties include formulating and enforcing standards of quality in the processing, preservation, packaging, labeling, importation, exportation, distribution and advertising of fresh and primary agricultural and fisheries products. It is also given powers to conduct regular inspections on agri-fisheries establishments and marketplaces.

It also provides assistance and establishing the scientific basis for food safety, trade standards and codes of practice and harmonizes them with internationally accepted standards and practices.

In 2016, the agency is noted for its reliance on voluntary compliance over compulsory enforcement of its set standards.
