= Bureau of Soils and Water Management =

Agency of the Philippine government

- Kawanihan ng Pamamahala sa Lupa at Tubig
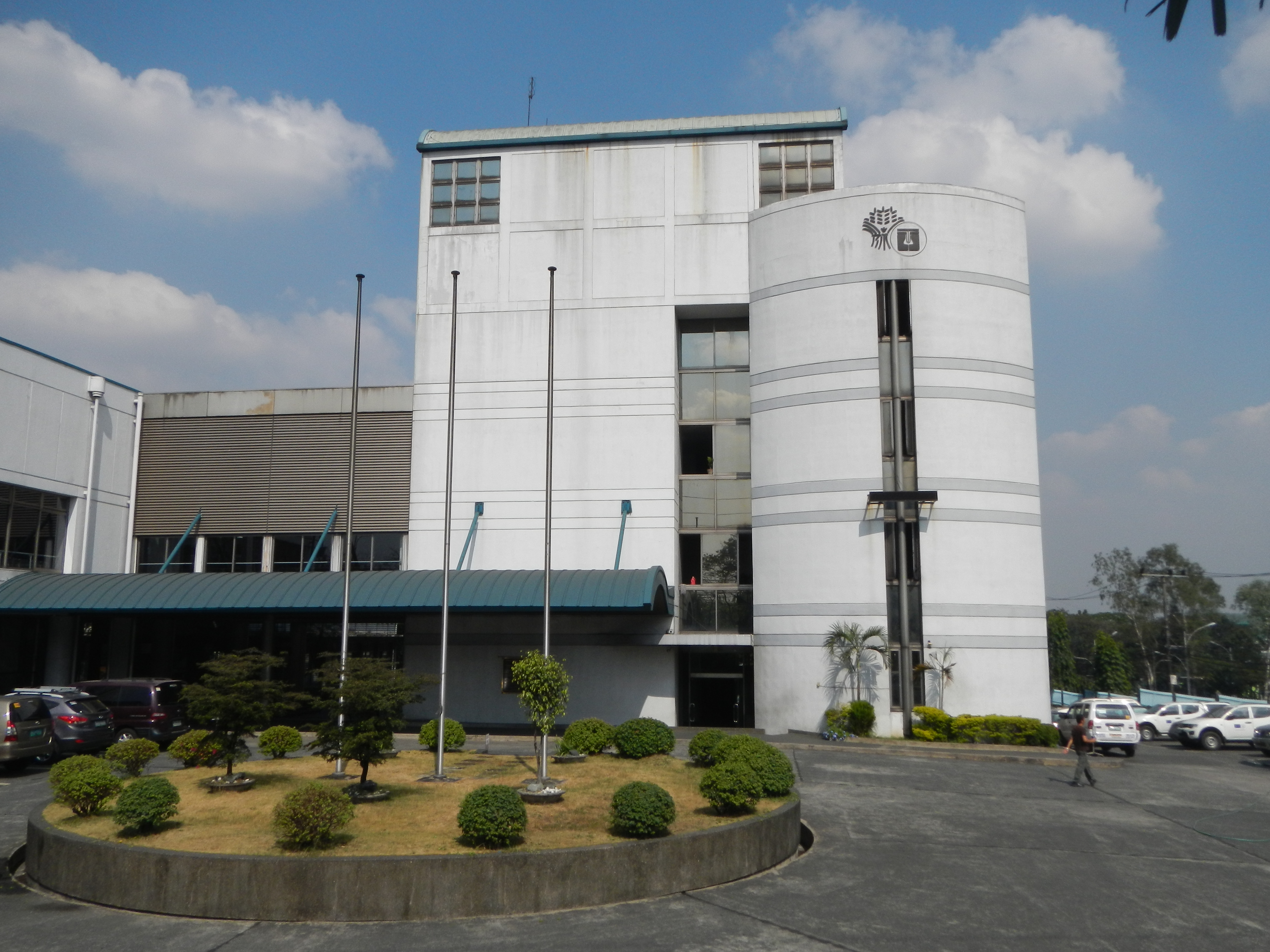
- SRDC Building, the home of the Bureau of Soils and Water Management headquarters

Agency overview
- Formed: June 5, 1951
- Headquarters: SRDC Building, Visayas Avenue corner Elliptical Road, Vasra, Quezon City, Philippines; 14°39′16″N 121°02′48″E
- Agency executive: Gina Parde-Nilo, PhD, Director
- Parent agency: Department of Agriculture
- Website: www.bswm.da.gov.ph

The Bureau of Soils and Water Management (BSWM; Filipino: Kawanihan ng Pamamahala sa Lupa at Tubig) is an agency of the Philippine government under the Department of Agriculture responsible for advising and rendering assistance on matters relative to the utilization of soils and water as vital agricultural resources.

== History ==
The first soil survey in the Philippines was conducted by Clarence W. Dorsey, an American soil scientist, in 1903. He classified the soils of Batangas Province. But it was not until 1921 at the Division of the Soil and Fertilizers was organized under the Bureau of Science. Its activities were confined to the studies of the chemistry of soils and fertilizers. Most of the studies were done at sugarcane areas.

In 1934, the Soil Survey Committee was organized by the Secretary of Agriculture and Commerce. The committee was composed of the Directors of the Bureau of Science, of Plant Industry, of Lands, of Forestry, of Mines and of Weather. The Undersecretary was the Committee Chairman.

In 1936, the Bureau of Science reorganized the Division of Soils and Fertilizers into the Division of Soil Survey staffed by 19 personnel. In 1939, the National Assembly enacted Commonwealth Act 416 mandating agronomical soil survey to the Division of Soil Survey. To accomplish this goal, the Division was reorganized and expanded to five sections.

World War II interrupted the activities and the Soil Survey Division was among those abolished. It was not until after the war in 1945 that the Soil Survey Division was reorganized. Unlike the pre-war activities, however, the focus of activities during this time was conservation survey. The outputs served as the fundamental basis for laying the principles needed to undertake soil conservation work. The first soil conservation project of the Division was established at the Buenavista Estate in San Idelfonso, Bulacan.

In 1948, the Soil Survey Division was again reorganized into the Division of Soil Survey and Conservation with four sections to carry out its function.

On June 5, 1951, the Congress of the Republic of the Philippines enacted Republic Act No. 622 organizing the Bureau of Soil Conservation consisting of five divisions. Dr. Marcos M. Alicante was named the first director. It is this date that every year the Bureau celebrates as its founding anniversary. In 1964, the agency was renamed the Bureau of Soils. The bureau's regional offices were created to bring the services closer to the farming communities. Since then, the bureau has become a major planning, policymaking, consultative and advisory agency of the Department of Agriculture and Natural Resources.

Gloom dawned on the Bureau on September 24, 1972, when Presidential Decree No. 1 reorganized the executive branch of the national government splitting the Department of Agriculture and Natural Resources into two departments and merging the Bureau of Soils with the Bureau of Plant Industry. Vigorous and active representation was made, with no less than its director at that time of merging, Godofredo N. Alcasid advocating for the retention of the Bureau of Soils as a distinct agency from the Bureau of Plant Industry. He was supported by the members of the Soil Science Society of the Philippines. In March 1973, the two merged agencies were again separated.

On January 30, 1987, President Corazon Aquino reorganized the Bureau of Soils into the Bureau of Soils and Water Management through Executive Order No. 116. The Bureau retained its staff function of soil resources survey, evaluation, conservation, testing and research but its mandate was broadened to include the development and generation of water resources utilization and conservation technologies as well as inclusion of rainmaking projects to alleviate the impact of prolonged drought on standing crops.

In October 1988, the Republic of the Philippines through the Department of Agriculture entered into an agreement with the Government of Japan through the Japan International Cooperation Agency (JICA) for the establishment of the Soils Research and Development Center (SRDC). The groundbreaking ceremony for the Center construction was made in 1989.

In January 1990, the Bureau moved from Sunvesco Building along Taft Avenue and Court of Appeals Building along Maria Orosa Street, Ermita, Manila, where the technical and administrative offices and the laboratories were then housed to its new home, the Soils Research and Development Center (SRDC) in Diliman, Quezon City.

In March 1991, the new SRDC Building was inaugurated by President Corazon Aquino with the Honorable Toshi Goto, the Ambassador of Japan to the Philippines. SRDC's goal to become the center for soil and water based researches and technologies to sustain self-sufficiency in agricultural production was boosted with the SRDC-JICA Technical Cooperation, Phase I. This was completed in 1995.

Phase II of the technical cooperation was started in 1996. The second phase focused on three (3) areas of research:

- Soils and Fertilizers
- Soil Conservation
- Soil Productivity Capability Classification

With the completion of the Phase II of the technical cooperation in January 2000, another project with JICA was launched in February 2000 - The Environmental and Productivity Management of Marginal Soils in the Philippines (EPMMA).
