= National Irrigation Administration =

Philippine government agency

- Pambansang Pangasiwaan sa Patubig (Filipino)
- NIA logo

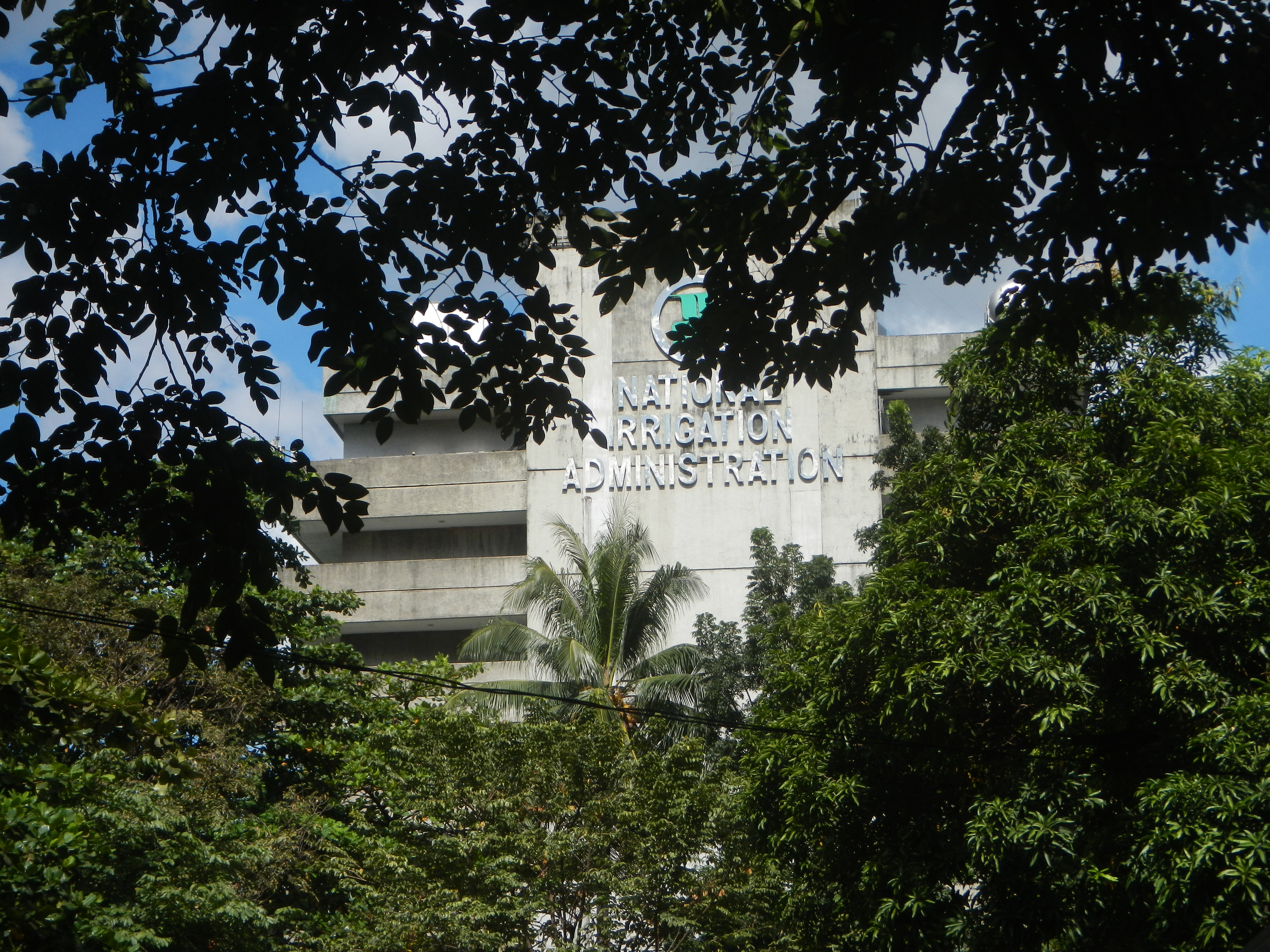
- NIA Central Office in Quezon City

Agency overview
- Formed: June 22, 1963; 63 years ago
- Headquarters: EDSA, National Government Center, Diliman, Quezon City 1100, Metro Manila, Philippines; 14°38′18″N 121°02′33″E
- Agency executive: Eduardo "Eddie" G. Guillen Benny D. Antiporda (suspended), Administrator
- Parent Agency: Department of Agriculture
- Website: www.nia.gov.ph

The National Irrigation Administration (NIA; Filipino: Pambansang Pangasiwaan sa Patubig) is a government-owned and controlled corporation of the Philippine government responsible for irrigation development and management in the Philippines.

== History ==
NIA was created under Republic Act (RA) 3601, signed by President Diosdado Macapagal on June 22, 1963. Its charter was amended by Presidential Decree (PD) 552 signed by President Ferdinand Marcos on September 11, 1974, and PD 1702 on July 17, 1980. Both increased capitalization and broadened the agency's authority.

NIA's forerunner was the Irrigation Division of the defunct Bureau of Public Works. NIA was placed under the Office of the President (OP) upon its creation. It was attached to the Department of Public Works, Transportation, and Communication under PD No.1, dated September 23, 1972. The issuance also integrated all irrigation activities under the agency. The Administrative Code of 1987, signed by President Corazon Aquino on July 25, 1987, attached NIA to both the Department of Public Works and Highways (DPWH) and Department of Agriculture (DA). But NIA remained attached to DPWH. It was transferred to OP pursuant to Executive Order No. 22 issued by President Fidel V. Ramos on September 14, 1992. Then, it was attached to DA under Administrative Order No. 17, dated October 14, 1992.

Executive Order No. 165, signed by President Benigno Aquino III, transferred the NIA, National Food Authority, Philippine Coconut Authority, and Fertilizer and Pesticide Authority to the Office of the President on May 5, 2014. Memorandum Order No. 70, Providing for the functions of the Presidential Assistant for Food Security and Agricultural Modernization, May 5, 2014.

Memorandum from the Executive Secretary - Office of the President, the Secretary of the Office of the Cabinet Secretary was designated Acting Chairperson of the NIA Board of Directors, November 3, 2016.

On April 25, 2022, President Rodrigo Duterte transferred NIA back to the Department of Agriculture by virtue of Executive Order No. 168. It again reverted to the Office of the President following the issuance of Executive Order 69 by President Bongbong Marcos on September 5, 2024.

== See also ==
- Agriculture in the Philippines
