= Philippine Fiber Industry Development Authority =

- Pangasiwaan sa Pagpapaunlad ng Industriya ng Himaymay
- PhilFIDA Logo

Agency overview
- Formed: July 27, 1981; 45 years ago (as Fiber Industry Development Authority); May 29, 2013; 13 years ago (present form, consolidation of FIDA and CODA)
- Jurisdiction: Philippines
- Headquarters: DA-PCAF Bldg., Department of Agriculture Compound, Elliptical Road, Diliman, Quezon City, Philippines
- Employees: 573 (2024)
- Annual budget: ₱403.1 million (2021)
- Agency executive: Arnold "Ali" Ilagan Atienza January 2025, Executive Director
- Parent agency: Department of Agriculture
- Website: https://philfida.da.gov.ph/

The Philippine Fiber Industry Development Authority (PhilFIDA; Filipino: Pangasiwaan sa Pagpapaunlad ng Industriya ng Himaymay) is an agency of the Department of Agriculture responsible for promoting the accelerated growth and development of the fiber industry in the Philippines, such as abaca, also known as Manila hemp and cotton.

The Fiber Industry Development Authority (FIDA) was created by Executive Order No. 709 on July 27, 1981 (during Martial Law) to promote the growth and development of the fiber industry in all its aspects including research, production, processing, marketing and trade regulation. It is headed by an administrator who is assisted by two deputy administrators and supported by nine divisions and ten regional offices.

The Philippines provided 87.4% of the world's abaca in 2014, earning the Philippines US$111.33 million. The demand is still greater than the supply. The Bicol region produced 27,885 metric tons of abaca in 2014, the largest of any Philippine region. Over 122,000 farmers farmed 176,594 hectares of abaca in 2014.

Republic Act 8486 otherwise known as the Cotton Industry Development Act of 1998 created the Cotton Development Administration (CODA) on February 11, 1998. The new cotton agency emerged from the fusion of the two cotton agencies of the government - erstwhile Philippine Cotton Corporation and the Cotton Development Institute. CODA is the sole agency of the government tasked to undertake initiatives that will spur the growth of the local cotton industry through cotton research, development and extension.

The Philippine Fiber Industry Development Authority (PhilFIDA) was created on May 29, 2013, through the consolidation of the Fiber Industry Development Authority (FIDA) and the Cotton Development Administration (CODA) as part of the Rationalization Plan of the Department of Agriculture.

Historical Organization Structure of the Philippine Fiber Industry Development Authority (PhilFIDA)
