= Philippine Coconut Authority =

Philippine government agency

- Pangasiwaan sa Niyog ng Pilipinas

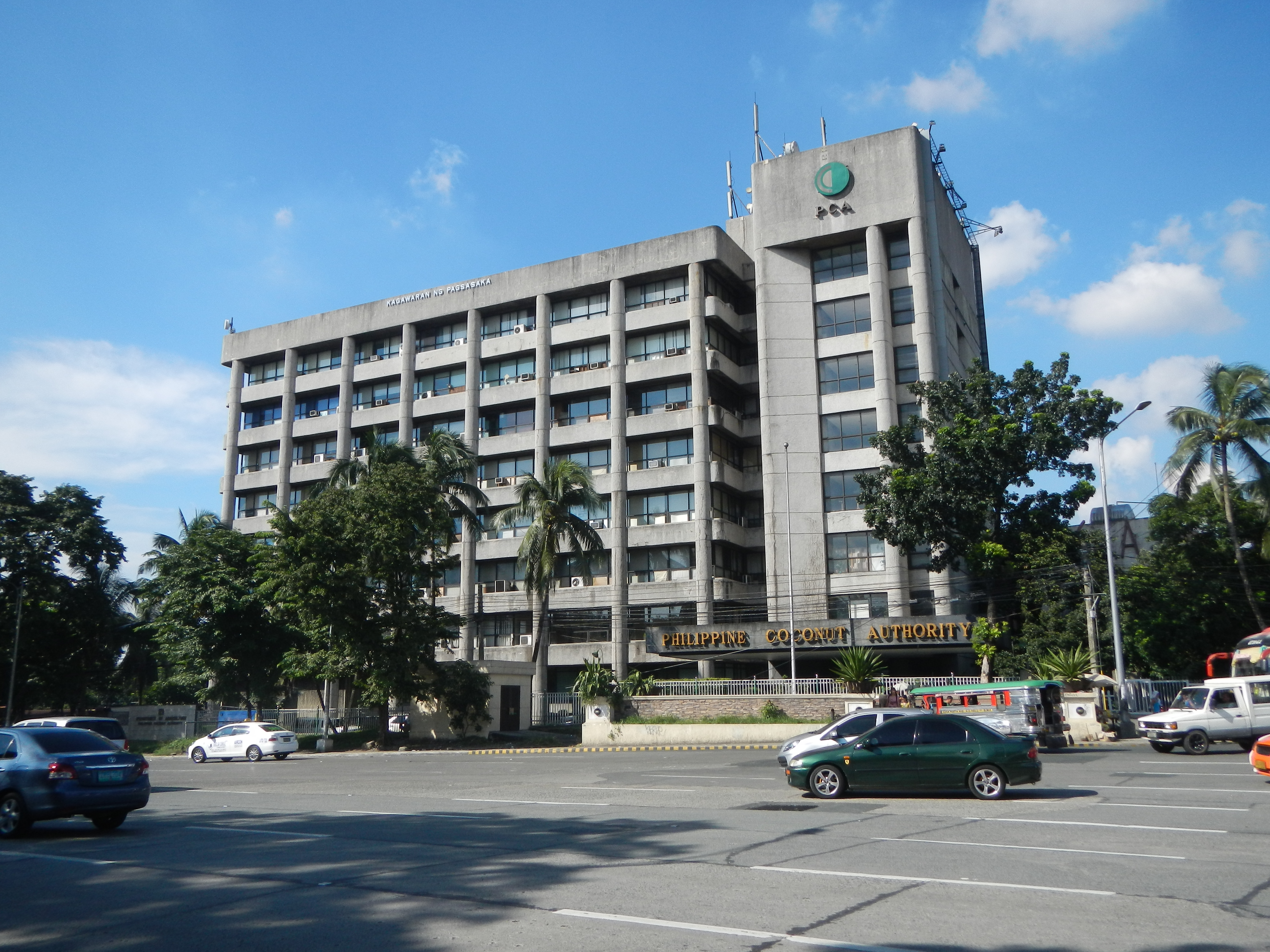
- PHILCOA headquarters, Quezon City

Agency overview
- Formed: June 30, 1973; 53 years ago
- Headquarters: Elliptical Road, Vasra, Diliman, Quezon City; 14°39′14″N 121°03′06″E
- Agency executive: Dr. Dexter R. Buted, Administrator
- Parent agency: Department of Agriculture
- Website: www.pca.da.gov.ph

The Philippine Coconut Authority (PCA or PHILCOA, Filipino pronunciation: [ˈpilkɔwɐ]; Filipino: Pangasiwaan sa Niyog ng Pilipinas) is an agency of the Philippine government under the Department of Agriculture (from 2014 to 2018, under the Office of the President of the Philippines and the Office of the Cabinet Secretary) responsible for developing the coconut and other palm oil industry to its full potential in line with the new vision of a united, globally competitive and efficient industry.

== History ==
The Philippine Coconut Authority was created pursuant to Presidential Decree 232 on June 30, 1973. It absorbed and assumed the powers and functions of the then Coconut Coordinating Council (CCC), the Philippine Coconut Administration (PHILCOA) and the Philippine Coconut Research Institute (PHILCORIN).

In 1940, the National Coconut Corporation (NACOCO) was created to promote the growth and development of the industry. It was later renamed in 1954, as the Philippine Coconut Administration (PHILCOA) with the same function and responsibilities.

Ten years after, PHILCOA expanded its scope of operations and renamed as Philippine Coconut Research Institute (PHILŒCORIN) an agency created to monitor, evaluate and conduct researches on the coconut.

It was in 1971, at the height of the Period of Expansion when the Coconut Coordinating Council (CCC) was created in lieu of PHILCORIN and was tasked to supervise, coordinate and evaluate the implementation of the coconut self-sufficiency program of the government.

But these agencies lacked singleness in its purpose. The framework upon which they operated did not revolve around the total development of the coconut industry where coconut farmers stood at the focal point.

In view of this, the Government of the Philippines deemed it necessary to create an agency that would address that situation, thus, the Philippine Coconut Authority was created on June 30, 1973 by virtue of Presidential Degree No. 232. It absorbed and assumed the powers and functions, including the personnel and assets of the then defunct CCC, PHILCOA, and the PHILCORIN.

Philippine Coconut Authority became an independent public corporation on July 14, 1976 pursuant to Presidential Degree No. 961, reporting directly and supervised solely by the Office of the President. This Decree was the first codification of the laws dealing with the development of the coconut and other palm oil industry.

The Code was later revised on June 11, 1978 by Presidential Decree No. 1468 ("Revised Coconut Industry Code") which eventually became the charter of PCA as a public corporation.

On January 30, 1987, pursuant to Executive Order No. 116, the Philippine Coconut Authority was officially declared as an attached Agency of the Department of Agriculture (DA). The declaration of transfer to DA from the Office of the President was enacted to provide overall coordination and monitoring of policies and programs of various sectors in agriculture. The attachment was confirmed and incorporated in the Administrative Code of 1987.

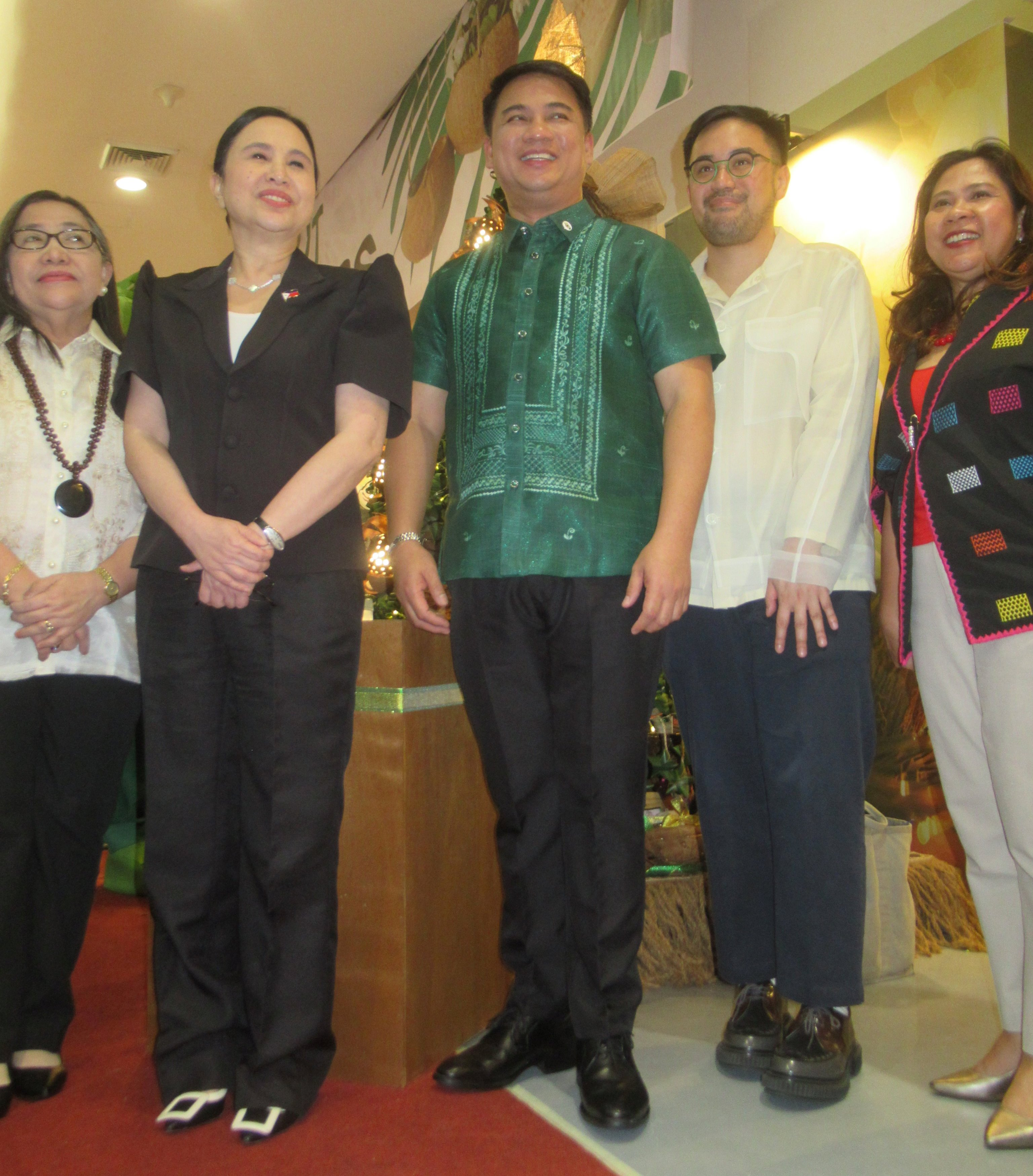
Administrator Dexter Respicio Buted, Sec. Cristina Aldeguer-Roque & Toff de Venecia

On May 5, 2014, President Benigno Aquino III reassigned the National Food Authority, the Philippine Coconut Authority, the National Irrigation Administration, and the Fertilizer and Pesticide Authority from the Department of Agriculture back to the Office of the President, with Kiko Pangilinan given oversight responsibilities for the four agencies. NFA administrator Orlan Calayag and PCA administrator Euclides G. Forbes then both chose to step down from their respective positions on May 8 in order to allow Pangilinan to appoint his own preferred candidates to head the agencies.

On July 4, 2016, PCA was among the 12 agencies, formerly from the Office of the President reassigned to the Office of the Cabinet Secretary, based on Executive Order No. 1 issued by President Rodrigo Duterte. It was transferred back to the Department of Agriculture, along with the National Food Authority and the Fertilizer and Pesticide Authority, by Executive Order No. 62 issued in September 2018.

== Cooperation in earthquake relief ==
A 2014 report indicated that the Philippine Coconut Authority had partnered with the Bureau of Fisheries and Agriculture in a Food-For-Work programme designed to provide sustainable sources of livelihood for people impacted by the 2013 Bohol earthquake.
