= National Fisheries Research and Development Institute =

Government research agency in the Philippines

Agency overview
- Formed: March 23, 1998; 28 years ago
- Jurisdiction: Philippines
- Headquarters: Fisheries Building Complex, BPI Compound, Visayas Avenue, Vasra, Quezon City, Philippines
- Agency executive: Maria Theresa M. Mutia, Ph.D., Executive Director
- Parent agency: Department of Agriculture
- Website: https://nfrdi.da.gov.ph/

The National Fisheries Research and Development Institute (NFRDI) is an attached agency of the Department of Agriculture tasked to scientific investigations and technological development programs specifically tailored for the domestic fisheries sector in the Philippines. As the principal marine and freshwater research agency, NFRDI is established as the primary research arm of the Bureau of Fisheries and Aquatic Resources to supply empirical baseline data required for the formulation of national aquatic resource policies.

== History ==
The formal institutionalization of marine and inland aquatic research in the Philippines originated during the immediate post-war period of the late 1940s and early 1950s. The national government identified a structural deficit in the technical capacity and financial resources allocated to the agricultural sector, a condition that forced several localized marine biology projects to suspend operations. It established the Philippine Institute of Fisheries Technology to address this gap in human capital and technical expertise. The creation of this institute provided a centralized mechanism for training personnel in standardized marine science protocols.

Between July 1947 and June 1950, the institute facilitated the transfer of selected students to the United States for advanced technical instruction under the parameters of the Philippine Fishery Program. The individuals trained through this bilateral initiative returned to the domestic workforce and initiated localized scientific studies. The accumulation of these early biological surveys required a standardized platform for dissemination. This requirement led to the inception of The Philippine Journal of Fisheries in 1951.

The pilot issue of the journal served as the official academic organ for the Bureau of Fisheries, the Philippine Fisheries Commission, and subsequently the Bureau of Fisheries and Aquatic Resources. The publication mechanism allowed researchers to document the taxonomy of native species and record the catch statistics of early commercial fleets. The journal operated continuously for four decades, producing 23 separate volumes before its circulation ceased in 1992. The cessation of the journal aligned with a period of administrative restructuring within the national government, during which state-sponsored fisheries research experienced organizational fragmentation. The absence of a centralized publication platform reduced the visibility of domestic marine research. The scientific community required a dedicated national institute with a codified statutory mandate to consolidate research funding and standardize data collection methodologies across the archipelago.

Republic Act No. 8550, or the Philippine Fisheries Code of 1998 was enacted on February 25, 1998. It provided the formal legal instrument for the creation of a specialized research agency. Section 82 of this statute explicitly mandates the creation of the National Fisheries Research and Development Institute. The institute was established in recognition of the role of fisheries research in the development, management, conservation, and protection of the fisheries and aquatic resources of the Philippines.

Following the enactment of Republic Act No. 8550 in 1998, then Agriculture Secretary Edgardo Angara issued Administrative Order No. 25 in 1999. It directed the central office, national centers, and regional field offices to identify personnel from existing technical units to form the initial scientific staff. During this initial phase, 49 permanent personnel from the Research Division of the Bureau of Fisheries and Aquatic Resources were transferred to compose the workforce of the institute. The reliance on personnel seconded from an adjacent bureau created an interim organizational structure, limiting the capacity of the agency to expand its specialized laboratories.

In 2015, Republic Act No. 10654 was enacted to amend the Philippine Fisheries Code of 1998. The amendments aligned domestic maritime laws with international conventions targeting the prevention, deterrence, and elimination of illegal, unreported, and unregulated fishing. The amendments expanded the statutory responsibilities of the research institute, requiring the agency to supply the precise mathematical baselines utilized by the Bureau of Fisheries and Aquatic Resources to enforce spatial and temporal fishing restrictions.

The structural independence of the agency required the formal approval of a dedicated personnel roster by the national budget apparatus. The Department of Budget and Management released the Notice of Organization, Staffing and Compensation Action on February 15, 2019. The issuance of this document formally approved the plantilla of personnel for the institute, allocating 106 permanent civil service positions. Within this allocation, 39 positions were specifically reclassified or retitled to match the specialized scientific requirements of the agency's laboratories and field divisions. The approval of the plantilla allowed the agency to initiate formal recruitment procedures, establishing a Human Resource Merit Promotion and Selection Board under the procedural guidelines of the Civil Service Commission. The completion of the staffing authorization process culminated in the formal recognition of the institute as a distinct attached agency of the Department of Agriculture in 2020. This administrative classification solidified the operational separation between the generation of scientific data and the execution of regulatory law enforcement. The structural division ensures that biological stock assessments proceed independently from the policing functions managed by the Bureau of Fisheries and Aquatic Resources, isolating the scientific methodology from immediate enforcement pressures.

== Organizational structure ==
The institute is led by an executive director. The Philippine Fisheries Code of 1998 requires the executive director to hold a Doctorate degree in fisheries or a related scientific discipline, a provision designed to ensure that the administrative leadership possesses the technical literacy required to evaluate complex biological methodologies. The Fisheries Code also establishes a multi-sectoral governing board to oversee the administrative and scientific operations of the institute. The board possesses the authority to formulate policy guidelines, approve multi-year strategic plans, authorize specific research programs, and pass the annual operational budget. The board composed of representatives from the executive branch, academic institutions, and the private commercial sector. The inclusion of private sector representatives ensures that public research funding addresses the specific production variables affecting commercial and municipal yields.

Governing Board Designation	Represented Sector or Agency
Chairman	Undersecretary for Fisheries, Department of Agriculture
Vice Chairman	Director, Bureau of Fisheries and Aquatic Resources
Member	Executive Director, National Fisheries Research and Development Institute
Member	Executive Director, Philippine Council for Agriculture, Aquatic and Natural Resources Research and Development
Member	Academic Sector Representative
Member	Municipal Fisherfolk Subsector Representative
Member	Commercial Fishing Operator Subsector Representative
Member	Aquaculture Operator Subsector Representative
Member	Post-Harvest and Processor Subsector Representative

The internal organizational structure of the institute divides personnel into specialized technical divisions, support units, and regional research centers. The Planning, Policy, and Information Division consolidates raw field data, executes statistical analyses, and translates empirical findings into formal policy recommendations submitted to the Department of Agriculture. The Aquaculture Research and Development Division manages experimental studies concerning broodstock genetics, artificial seed production, and freshwater farming protocols. The Fisheries Postharvest Research and Development Division evaluates parameters related to fish handling, preservation technologies, new product formulation, seafood safety compliance, international trade economics, and technology business incubation.

The Capture Fisheries Research and Development Division executes the direct monitoring of wild populations, analyzes marine ecology variables, and models the environmental impact of commercial gear selectivity. Administrative support units maintain the institutional infrastructure required for national operations. The Finance and Administrative Division processes budgetary allocations, manages procurement disbursements, and oversees human resource compliance. The Training Division designs standardized educational modules and coordinates capacity-building seminars for external stakeholders, local government personnel, and internal staff.

The Bids and Awards Committee executes the procurement activities of the agency, evaluates competitive commercial bids, and recommends supply contracts in strict accordance with national procurement statutes.
