= Agricultural Training Institute =

Government agency of the Philippines

- Surian ng Pasanayang Pang-agrikultura

Agency overview
- Formed: January 30, 1987
- Headquarters: ATI Building, Elliptical Road, Vasra, Quezon City 1100, Philippines; 14°39′18″N 121°02′55″E
- Annual budget: ₱1.93 billion
- Agency executive: Remelyn R. Recoter, MNSA, CESO IV, Director IV
- Parent agency: Department of Agriculture
- Website: www.ati.da.gov.ph

The Agricultural Training Institute (ATI; Filipino: Surian ng Pasanayang Pang-agrikultura) is an agency of the Philippine government under the Department of Agriculture responsible for training agricultural extension workers and their clientele; conducting multi-level training programs to promote and accelerate rural development; and ensuring that research results are communicated to the farmers through appropriate training and extension activities.

== History ==
When the Ministry of Agriculture and Food was reorganized in January 1987 under the Executive Order No. 116, the Bureau of Agricultural Extension (BAEx), the Philippine Agricultural Training Council (PATC) and the Philippine Training Centers for Rural Development (PTC-RD) merged, and paved the way for the establishment of the Agricultural Training Institute (ATI).

The ATI started with ten training centers from the former PTC-RD when it became operational in 1987. A year after, the number of training centers nationwide rose to 26 when nine Regional Training Centers (RTC) and seven Farmers’ Training Centers (FTC) were set up.

In 1989, there was a total of 41 training centers nationwide after seven FTCs, seven Regional Fishermen's Training Centers (RFTC) and the International Training Center on Pig Husbandry (ITCPH) were installed.

ATI's role as the DA's extension and training arm was strengthened with the Republic Act 8435 or the Agriculture and Fisheries Modernization Act (AFMA) of 1997. But in November 1998, the RFTCs were turned over to the Bureau of Fisheries and Aquatic Resources. Also, the FTCs were renamed Provincial Training Centers.

At present, ATI, being the extension and training arm of the Philippine Department of Agriculture, is geographically situated nationwide to be able to reach its target clientele in the agriculture and fisheries sector. It has 16 regional training centers and one international training center, with its Central Office located at Diliman, Quezon City, Philippines.

== Agriculture and Fisheries Extension Thematic Programs ==
- Enhancing Access to Agriculture and Fisheries Extension Knowledge Products and Services
- Strengthening Competitiveness and Capacities of the Agriculture and Fisheries Sector
- Expanding Partnerships in Advancing Excellence in Agriculture and Fisheries Extension Delivery
- Scaling-up Agriculture and Fisheries Extension Innovations
- Strengthening Agriculture and Fisheries Extension Stakeholders' Capacity in Climate Change Resilience
- Improving Enabling Environment and Quality of Governance

== Major Services ==
- Technology Demonstration
- Farm and Business Advisory through the Farmers' Contact Center (FCC)
- Technical Assistance to Rural-based Organizations
- Provision of multimedia IEC materials at the Agriculture and Fisheries Knowledge Center
- e-Extension services through e-learning courses on A & F and digital learning resources
- Accreditation of Extension Services Providers (ESPs)
- Provision of extension grants to accredited ESPs
- Provision of grants for policy research on extension

== Sources ==
- Performance of Philippine Agriculture, January-March 2018 | Philippine Statistics Authority
- Philippine Statistics Authority | Republic of the Philippines
- Agriculture is dying in the Philippines
- Agricultural output slows down in 1st quarter of 2018
