= Sultan Naga Dimaporo =

Municipality in Lanao del Norte, Philippines

Sultan Naga Dimaporo سلطان نغا ديمافورؤ Karomatan
- Municipality
- Municipality of Sultan Naga Dimaporo
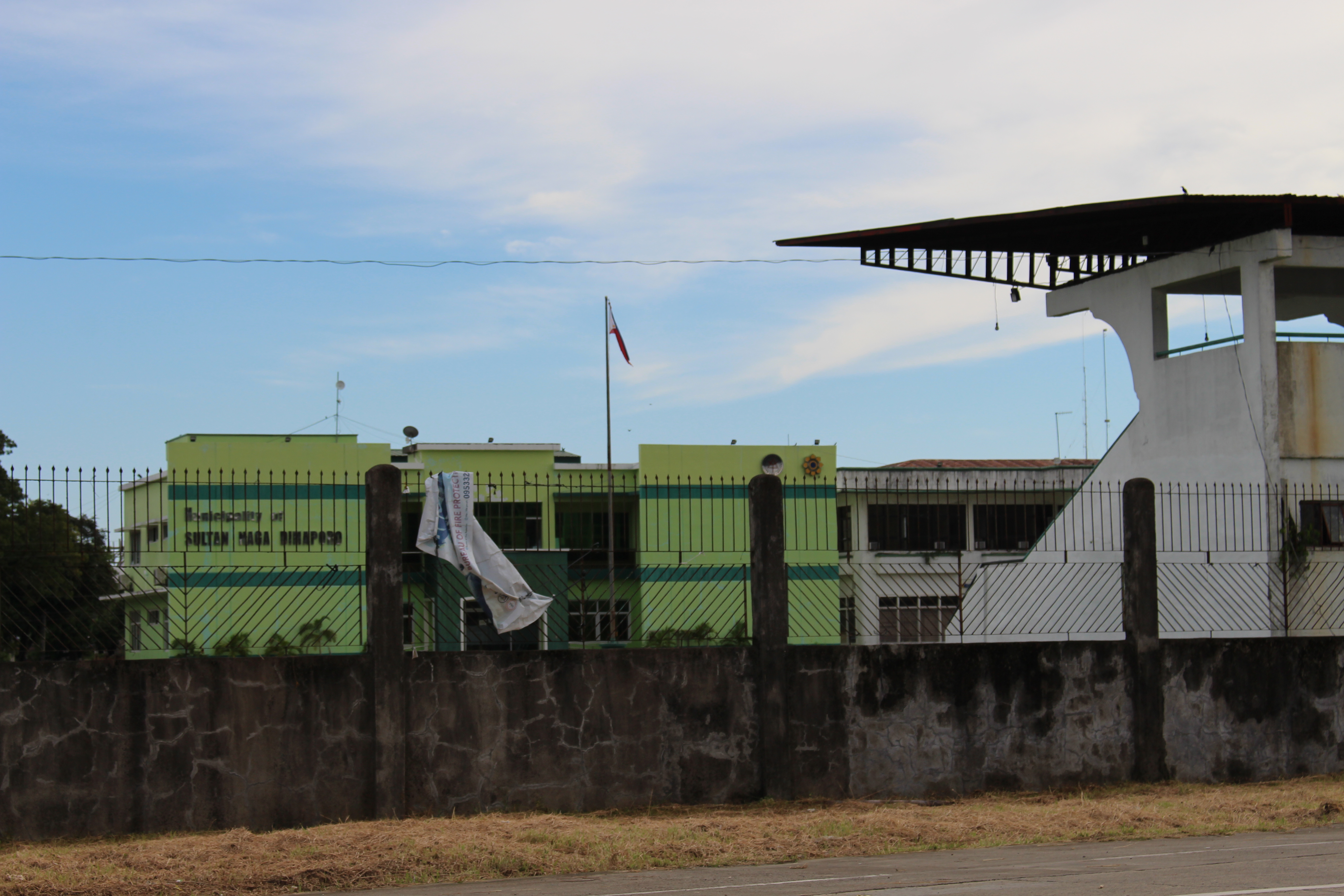
- Municipal Hall of Sultan Naga Dimaporo

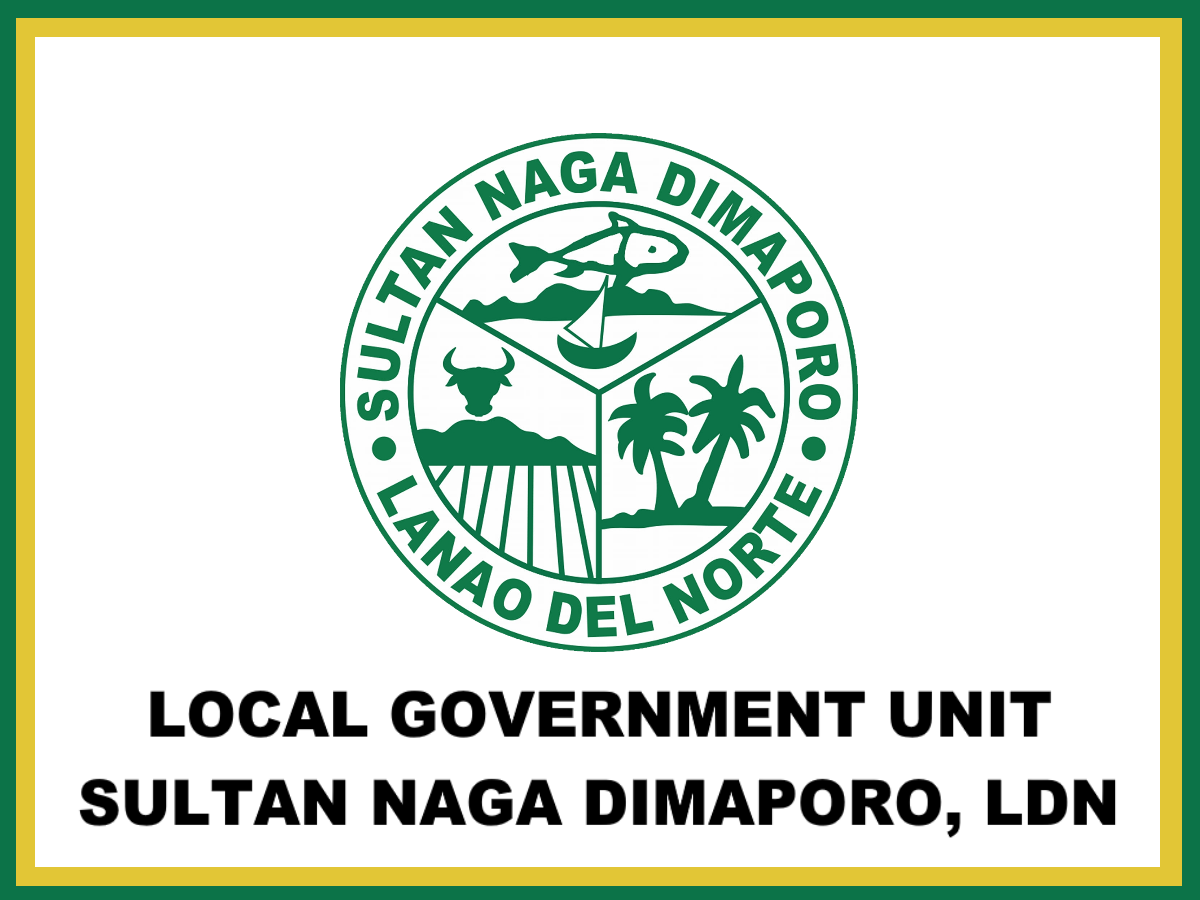
- Flag Seal

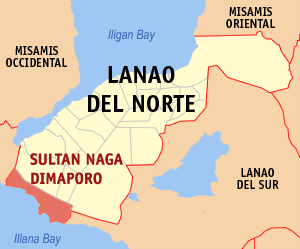
- Map of Lanao del Norte with Sultan Naga Dimaporo highlighted
- Interactive map of Sultan Naga Dimaporo
- Location within the Philippines
- Coordinates: 7°47′43″N 123°43′07″E
- Country: Philippines
- Region: Northern Mindanao
- Province: Lanao del Norte
- District: 2nd district
- Founded: April 10, 1953
- Named for: Sultan Naga Dimaporo
- Barangays: 37 (see Barangays)

Government
  - Type: Sangguniang Bayan
  - Mayor: Motalib M. Dimaporo
  - Vice Mayor: Ulwan M. Dimaporo
  - Representative: Sittie Aminah Q. Dimaporo
  - Municipal Council: Members: Casan P. Colo; Acmad G. Cotongan; Andam D. Maruhom; Norolhakiem M. Maruhom; Ansari P. Arumpac; Alvaro F. Damalerio Jr.; Raminito T. Lumayaga; Afsalur L. Malawani
  - Electorate: 30,170 voters (2025)

Area
  - Total: 230.99 km^{2} (89.19 sq mi)
- Elevation: 80 m (260 ft)
- Highest elevation: 603 m (1,978 ft)
- Lowest elevation: 0 m (0 ft)

Population (2024 census)
  - Total: 65,656
  - Density: 284.24/km^{2} (736.17/sq mi)
  - Households: 13,216

Economy
  - Income class: 1st municipal income class
  - Poverty incidence: 43.55% (2023)
  - Revenue: ₱ 214.5 million (2024)
  - Assets: ₱ 419.4 million (2024)
  - Expenditure: ₱ 201.9 million (2024)
  - Liabilities: ₱ 158.5 million (2024)

Service provider
  - Electricity: Lanao del Norte Electric Cooperative (LANECO)
- Time zone: UTC+8 (PST)
- ZIP code: 9215
- PSGC: 1003506000
- IDD : area code: +63 (0)63
- Native languages: Maranao; Cebuano; Binukid; Tagalog
- Major religions: Islam, Christianity

Sultan Naga Dimaporo, officially the Municipality of Sultan Naga Dimaporo (Maranao: Inged a Sultan Naga Dimaporo; Cebuano: Lungsod sa Sultan Naga Dimaporo; Filipino: Bayan ng Sultan Naga Dimaporo), is a municipality in the province of Lanao del Norte, Philippines. According to the 2024 census, it has a population of 65,656 people. It was formerly known as Karomatan.

== History ==
Executive Order No. 588, s. 1953 (Signed on April 30, 1953) created the Karomatan from the following:
(note that Lanao was split 1959)

- From Kapatagan: Tagalo, Mabohai, Pandanan, Pikinit, Dangoloan, Dableston, Calobi, Tapokon, Karomatan, Pitikol, Sigayan
- From Malabang: Bauyan, Dadoan, Calibao Payong

The barrio/baranggay of Karomatan was then made the Poblacion of this municipality

On November 5, 1992, former mayor Hadji Mohammad "Naga" Dimaporo was in Quiapo, Manila with his wife Sunang and four companions prior to his planned travel to Pakistan when he was assassinated near a mosque by four gunmen. Zamboanga del Sur police officer Jam Mitumadum Enca was arrested two weeks later upon the order of President Fidel V. Ramos for his alleged involvement in the killing, but was later acquitted by a court after two months in prison.

== Geography ==
Sultan Naga Dimaporo is located at the south-western part of the province of Lanao del Norte. It is bordered on the southeast by the municipality of Picong in Lanao del Sur, and on the west by the municipalities of Tukuran and Aurora, both in Zamboanga del Sur. To the south is the tip of Illana Bay, part of the Celebes Sea.

=== Barangays ===
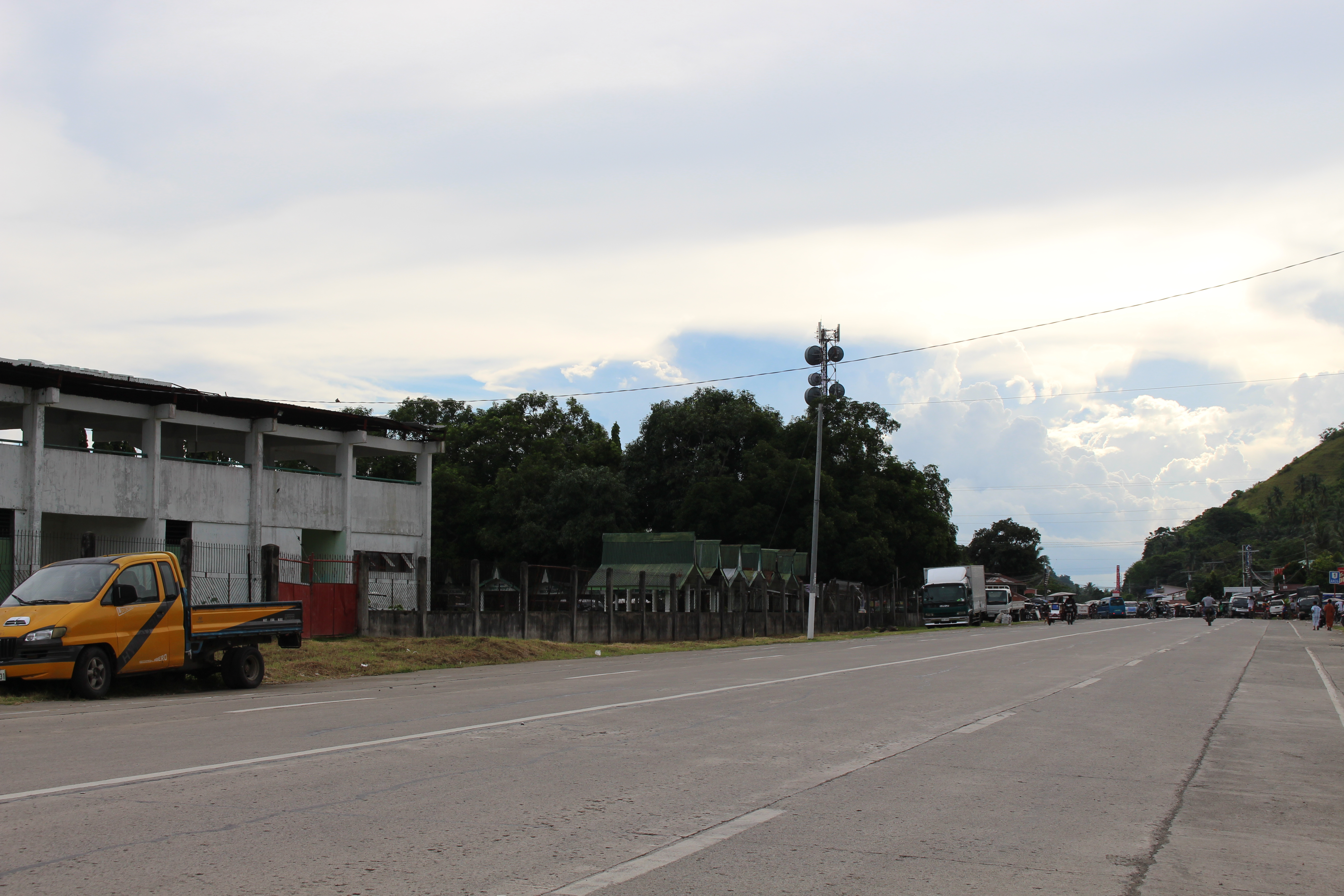
Poblacion of Sultan Naga Dimaporo

Sultan Naga Dimaporo is politically subdivided into 37 barangays. Each barangay consists of puroks while some have sitios.

- Bangaan
- Bangko
- Bansarvil II
- Bauyan
- Cabongbongan
- Calibao
- Calipapa
- Calube
- Campo Islam
- Capocao
- Dableston
- Dalama
- Dangolaan
- Ditago
- Ilian
- Kauswagan
- Kirapan
- Koreo
- Lantawan
- Mabuhay
- Maguindanao
- Mahayahay
- Mamagum
- Mina
- Pandanan
- Payong
- Piraka
- Pikalawag
- Pikinit
- Poblacion
- Ramain
- Rebucon
- Sigayan
- Sugod
- Tagulo
- Tantaon
- Topocon

=== Climate ===
Climate data for Sultan Naga Dimaporo, Lanao del Norte
Month	Jan	Feb	Mar	Apr	May	Jun	Jul	Aug	Sep	Oct	Nov	Dec	Year
Mean daily maximum °C (°F)	29 (84)	30 (86)	31 (88)	31 (88)	30 (86)	30 (86)	29 (84)	30 (86)	30 (86)	30 (86)	30 (86)	29 (84)	30 (86)
Mean daily minimum °C (°F)	22 (72)	22 (72)	22 (72)	23 (73)	24 (75)	24 (75)	24 (75)	24 (75)	24 (75)	24 (75)	23 (73)	23 (73)	23 (74)
Average precipitation mm (inches)	69 (2.7)	58 (2.3)	67 (2.6)	60 (2.4)	109 (4.3)	114 (4.5)	83 (3.3)	78 (3.1)	76 (3.0)	92 (3.6)	86 (3.4)	63 (2.5)	955 (37.7)
Average rainy days	12.8	11.6	14.8	17.4	24.8	23.5	20.7	18.5	17.4	22.5	21.6	15.6	221.2
Source: Meteoblue

== Demographics ==
Population census of Sultan Naga Dimaporo
Year	Pop.	±% p.a.
1960	12,007	—
1970	18,741	+4.55%
1975	27,613	+8.08%
1980	31,984	+2.98%
1990	27,492	−1.50%
1995	36,131	+5.25%
2000	41,865	+3.21%
2007	46,004	+1.31%
2010	52,430	+4.87%
2015	56,764	+1.52%
2020	60,904	+1.49%
2024	65,656	+1.82%
Source: Philippine Statistics Authority

== Economy ==
Poverty incidence of Sultan Naga Dimaporo (%)

Source: Philippine Statistics Authority
