= Bureau of Plant Industry (Philippines) =

Philippine government agency

- Kawanihan ng Industriya sa Paghahalaman
- Logo

Agency overview
- Formed: January 30, 1987
- Headquarters: 692 San Andres Street, Malate, Manila, Philippines; 14°34′10″N 120°59′24″E
- Annual budget: ₱1.02 billion Php (2018)
- Agency executive: Gerald Glenn F. Panganiban, Ph.D., Director
- Parent agency: Department of Agriculture
- Website: buplant.da.gov.ph

The Bureau of Plant Industry (BPI; Filipino: Kawanihan ng Industriya sa Paghahalaman) is an agency of the Philippine government under the Department of Agriculture responsible for serving and supporting the Philippine plant industry sector.

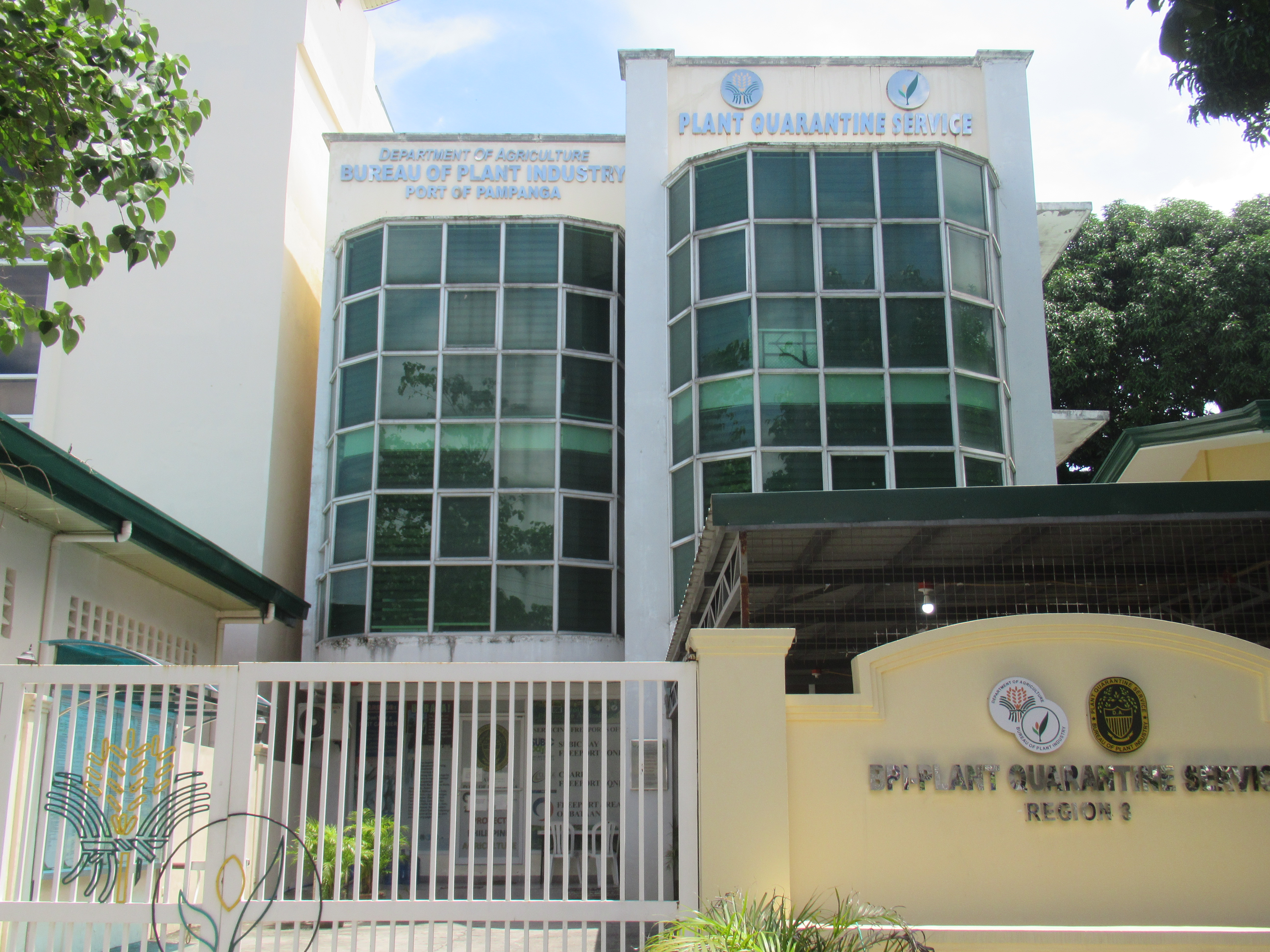
San Fernando, Pampanga

== History ==
On January 1, 1930, by virtue of Act 3639 of the Philippine Legislature, the Bureau of Agriculture was split into the Bureau of Animal Industry and Bureau of Plant Industry. The said Act defined the powers and functions of the two agencies. The BAI took over all activities concerning animals, animal diseases, and industrialization of animal products and the BPI taking over the tasks on plant research and crop production.

As created through series of laws, Executive and Administrative Orders, the Bureau has the primary mandates of:

- Promoting the development of plant industries through research and development;
- Crop production,
- Crop protection, and
- Effective technology promotion and transfer.

Through Executive Order 116 of President Corazon Aquino on January 30, 1987, BPI was reorganized to become a staff bureau under the production group of the renamed Department of Agriculture.

On December 15, 2000, the Bureau of Plant Industry under the leadership of Atty. BLO Umpar Adiong, was certified as ISO 9002 and considered as having a world class management system.

In 2014, Assistant Secretary Paz J. Benavidez II of the Department of Agriculture was named OIC Director of the Bureau of Plant Industry. She replaced Director Clarito Barron.
