= National Meat Inspection Service =

Philippine government agency

- Serbisyong Pambansa sa Pagsusuri ng Karne

Agency overview
- Formed: October 1, 1972; 54 years ago
- Type: Meat inspection agency
- Headquarters: No. 4, Visayas Avenue, Brgy. Vasra, Quezon City, Philippines 1228
- Employees: 309 (2025)
- Annual budget: ₱504.173 million (2025)
- Agency executive: Roberto S. Umali, DVM, Officer-in-Charge, Executive Director
- Parent agency: Department of Agriculture
- Website: nmis.gov.ph

The National Meat Inspection Service (NMIS; Filipino: Serbisyong Pambansa sa Pagsusuri ng Karne) is a Philippine government agency under the Department of Agriculture. NMIS is tasked with regulation and oversight pertaining to the handling, inspection, processing, storage and preservation of domestic and imported livestock and meat products within the country.
