= Fertilizer and Pesticide Authority =

- Pangasiwaan sa Pataba at Pestisidyo
- FPA Logo

Attached Agency overview
- Formed: May 30, 1977
- Preceding Attached Agency: Fertilizer Industry Authority
- Type: executive agency
- Jurisdiction: Government of the Philippines
- Headquarters: FPA Building, Bureau of Animal Industry (BAI) Compound, Visayas Avenue, Vasra, Quezon City; 14°39′24.77″N 121°2′49.2″E
- Employees: 138 (2024)
- Annual budget: ₱192.22 million (2020)
- Minister responsible: Sec. Ferdinand Romualdez Marcos Jr., Secretary of Agriculture
- Attached Agency executive: Julieta B. Lansangan, (OIC), Executive Director
- Parent Attached Agency: Department of Agriculture
- Website: www.fpa.da.gov.ph

The Fertilizer and Pesticide Authority (FPA; Filipino: Pangasiwaan sa Pataba at Pestisidyo) is a technical regulatory agency under the Department of Agriculture, of the Government of the Philippines. The agency is responsible for assuring adequate supply of fertilizer and pesticide at reasonable prices; rationalizing the manufacture and marketing of fertilizer; protecting the public from the risks of the inherent use of pesticides; and educating the agricultural sector in the use of these inputs.

== History ==
In 1972–1973, Philippines was beset by rice production shortfalls resulting from the series of typhoons and floods and fertilizer shortages spawned by the oil crisis. The resulting fourfold drop in rice production prompted the government to directly intervene in the operations of the fertilizer industry through the issuance of Presidential Decree (P.D.) No. 135 dated February 22, 1973, creating the Fertilizer Industry Authority (FIA).

Fertilizer and pesticide are vital agricultural inputs in food production and must be supplied in adequate quantities at reasonable costs at all times. The fertilizer and pesticide industries have much in common in terms of clientele, distribution channels, system of application in farmers' fields and technical supervision by the same farm management technicians under the government's food production program. In view hereof, the government abolished the FIA and created the Fertilizer and Pesticide Authority on May 30, 1977, by virtue of P.D. 1144.

The FPA is mandated to assure adequate supplies of fertilizer and pesticide at reasonable prices; rationalize the manufacture and marketing of fertilizer; protect the public from the risks inherent in the use of pesticides; and educate the agricultural sector in the use of these inputs. It was attached to the Department of Agriculture until President Benigno C. Aquino, on May 5, 2014, issued Executive Order No. 165 transferring the FPA and the three other agencies, the NIA, the PCA and the NFA, to the Office of the President of the Philippines.

In September 2018, President Rodrigo Duterte issued Executive Order No. 62 that transferred the agency from the Office of the President to the Department of Agriculture.
