= Agriculture and Fisheries Modernization Act of 1997 =

Legislation in the Philippines

The Agriculture and Fisheries Modernization Act of 1997 (AFMA), officially designated as Republic Act No. 8435, is a comprehensive legislation that provides blueprint for the sector’s modernization and rural development in the Philippines.

== History ==
The Agriculture and Fisheries Modernization Act (AFMA), or Republic Act 8435, was signed into law in December 1997 by President Fidel V. Ramos. AFMA focuses on 5 major concerns: poverty alleviation and social equity, food security, global competitiveness, sustainable development, and income profitability especially for farmers and fisherfolk.

Trade and fiscal incentives are provided under AFMA. Section 109 of RA 8435 provides that all enterprises engaged in agriculture and fishery duly certified by the Department of Agriculture in consultation with the Department of Finance and the Board of Investments (BOI) shall, for 5 years be exempted from the payment of tariff duties.
