= National Food Authority (Philippines) =

Philippine government's food security agency

- Pambansang Pangasiwaan sa Pagkain

Agency overview
- Formed: September 26, 1972; 54 years ago
- Headquarters: Visayas Avenue, Quezon City 1128, Metro Manila, Philippines
- Agency executive: Larry R. Lacson, Officer in Charge
- Parent agency: Department of Agriculture
- Website: www.nfa.gov.ph

The National Food Authority (NFA; Filipino: Pambansang Pangasiwaan sa Pagkain) is an agency of the Philippine government under the Department of Agriculture responsible for maintaining sufficient rice buffer stock to be sourced solely from local farmers and distributed efficiently especially during calamities and emergencies, the Philippines' staple grain.

== History ==
The National Food Authority was created by President Ferdinand Marcos through Presidential Decree No. 4 dated September 26, 1972, under the name National Grains Authority (NGA) with the mission of promoting the integrated growth and development of the grains industry covering rice, corn, feed grains and other grains like sorghum, mung beans, and peanuts. This decree abolished two agencies, namely, the Rice and Corn Board (RICOB) and the Rice and Corn Administration (RCA) and absorbed their respective functions into the NFA. The former was then regulating the rice and corn retail trade and was tasked to nationalize it within a target date. The latter was marketed and distributed government low-priced rice especially during lean months. In addition, the new agency was vested with additional functions aimed at developing post-harvest systems and processes.

Among others, the NGA supported the paddy production program of the government referred to as the Masagana 99 agricultural program, which was geared toward rice self-sufficiency. It engaged in massive paddy procurement at government support prices, and with limited volume, the country joined the family of rice exporting countries from 1977 to 1981. Economists generally acknowledge Masagana 99 to have failed because the supervised credit scheme it offered to farmers proved unsustainable.

On January 14, 1981, Presidential Decree No. 1770 renamed the NGA and established the National Food Authority (NFA), further widening the agency's social responsibilities and commodity coverage to include, in addition to grains, other food items like raw or fresh fruits and vegetables and fish and marine, manufactured, processed, or packaged food products, and these were collectively referred to as non-grains commodities. This law was the basis of the Kadiwa stores or government retail stores, which sold low-priced basic food and household items which were established within the National Capital Region and in all the provinces of the Philippines.

On May 31, 1985, Executive Order No. 1028 provided for the deregulation of NFA's non-grains marketing activities, specifically terminating NFA's non-grains trading activities, returning feed grains and wheat importation to the private sector, and lifting price controls on rice and corn. As such, at the end of 1986, all the Kadiwa Stores had sold or closed.

Today, the National Food Authority is charge with ensuring the food security of the country and the stability of supply and price of the staple grain-rice. It performs these functions through various activities and strategies, which include procurement of paddy from individual farmers and their organizations, buffer stocking, processing activities, dispersal of paddy and milled rice to strategic locations and distribution of the staple grain to various marketing outlets at appropriate times of the year.

In recent years, in response to globalization and to the efforts to reduce the national budget deficit, the government has been looking into the possibility of restructuring, streamlining or privatizing certain activities of the NFA.

On May 5, 2014, Executive Order No. 165 signed by President Benigno Aquino III reassigned the National Food Authority and three other agencies to the Office of the President, with oversight responsibilities for the four agencies given to Francis Pangilinan in the newly created post of Presidential Assistant for Food Security and Agricultural Modernization. Then-NFA administrator Orlan Calayag stepped down in what he described as a "courtesy resignation" so that Pangilinan could appoint his own preferred candidate to head the NFA.

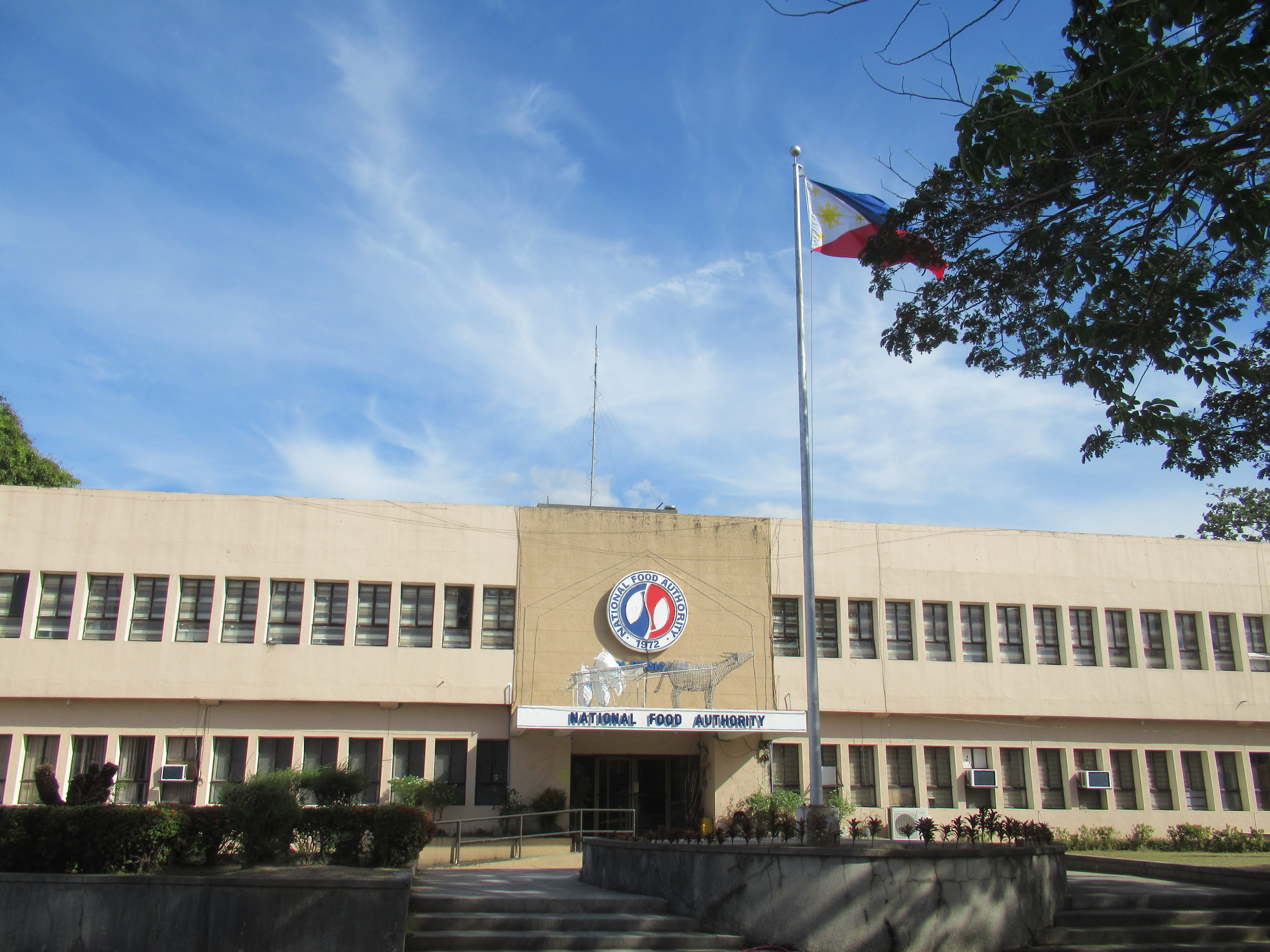
NFA Cabanatuan

On July 4, 2016, NFA was among the 12 agencies, formerly from the Office of the President reassigned to the Office of the Cabinet Secretary, based on Executive Order No. 1 issued by President Rodrigo Duterte. It was restored to the Department of Agriculture, along with the Philippine Coconut Authority and the Fertilizer and Pesticide Authority, by Executive Order No. 62 issued in September 2018.

The Ombudsman of the Philippines’ issued a 6 months preventive suspension order effective on March 4, 2024 against Administrator Roderico R. Bioco and 138 other officials and employees, including Assistant Administrator for Operations John Robert Hermano and several regional managers and warehouse supervisors nationwide. Imee Marcos filed Senate Resolution 940 on March 4, 2024 "to investigate, in aid of legislation, the NFA's alleged irregular disposition and sale of repacked rice stocks to rice traders at low prices.probe into 'irregular' sale of NFA rice sought." On March 19, 2024, Director Larry Lacson has been named as NFA Officer in Charge after the Office of the Ombudsman of the Philippines's 6-month suspension administrator, Roderico Bioco.

== See also ==
- Food Terminal Inc.
