= Department of Agriculture (Philippines) =

Executive department of the Philippine government

- Kagawaran ng Agrikultura
- Seal of the Department of Agriculture

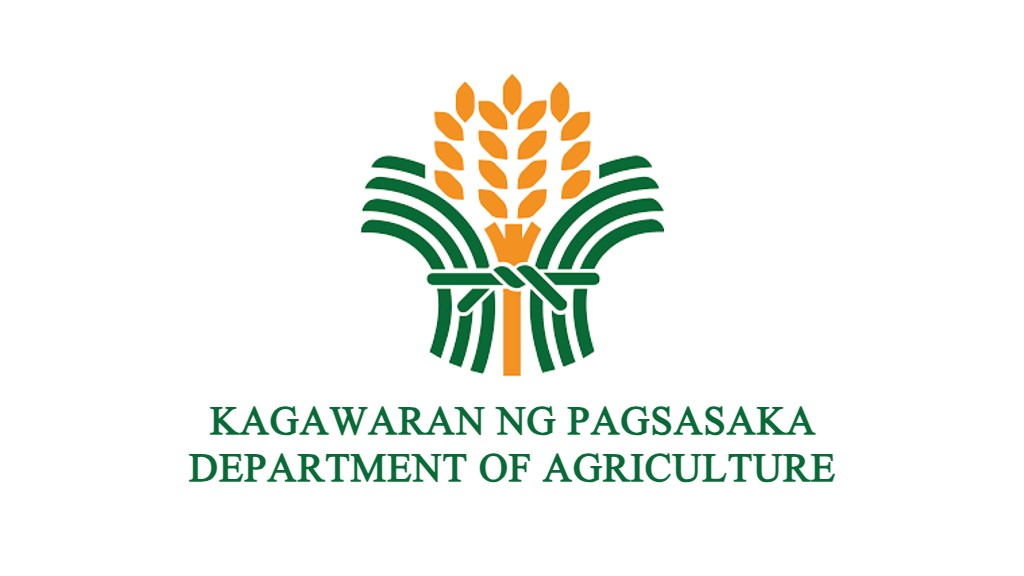
- Flag of the Department of Agriculture

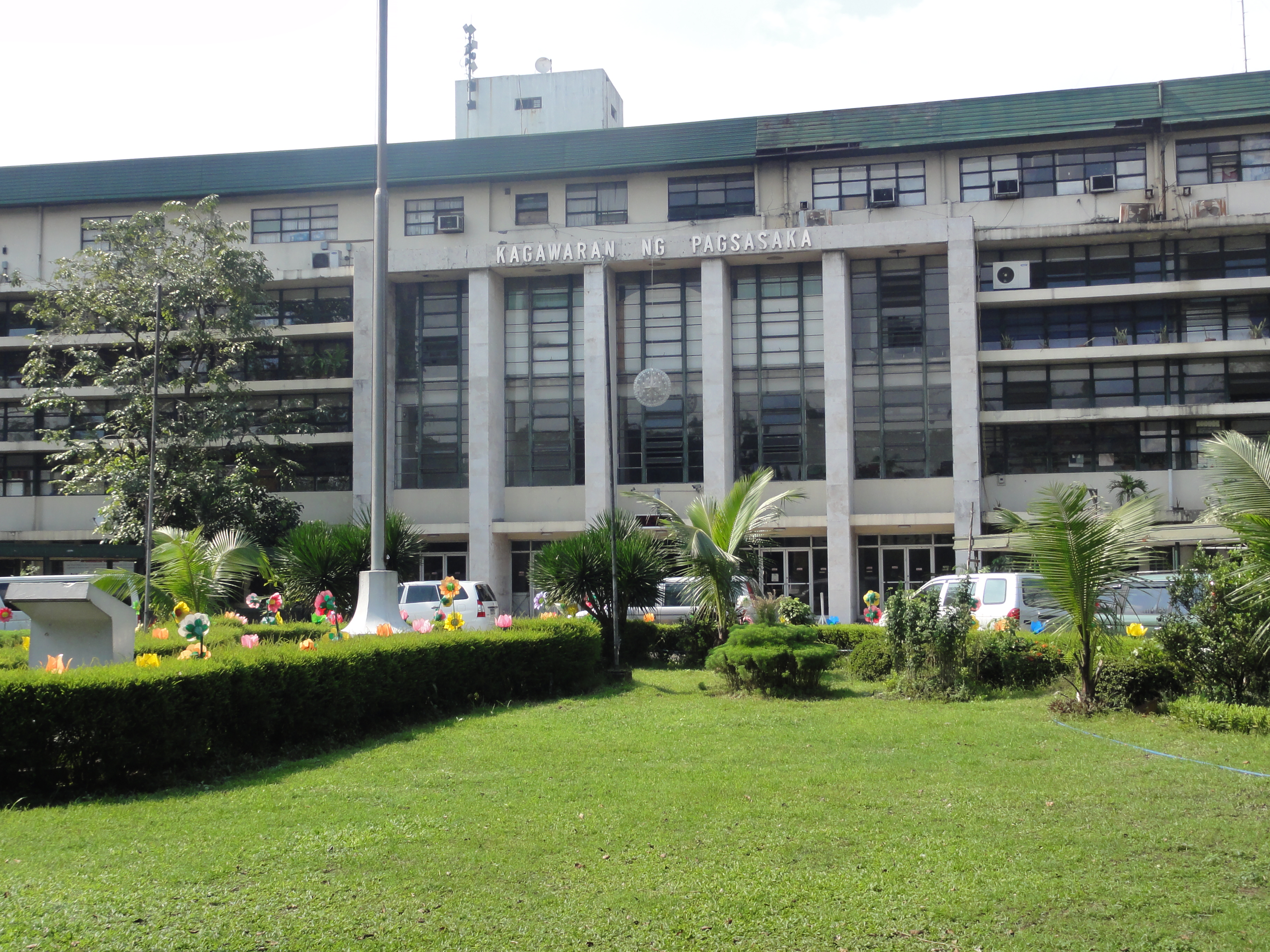
- Department of Agriculture building

Department overview
- Formed: June 23, 1898; 128 years ago
- Headquarters: Elliptical Road, Vasra, Diliman, Quezon City 1100; 14°39′12.56″N 121°2′45.02″E
- Employees: 6,212 (2026)
- Annual budget: ▲ ₱185.77 billion (2026)
- Department executive: Francisco Tiu Laurel Jr., Secretary
- Website: www.da.gov.ph

The Department of Agriculture (DA; Filipino: Kagawaran ng Agrikultura) is the executive department of the Philippine government responsible for the promotion of agricultural and fisheries development and growth. It has its headquarters at Elliptical Road corner Visayas Avenue, Diliman, Quezon City.

The department is currently led by the secretary of agriculture, nominated by the president of the Philippines and confirmed by the Commission on Appointments. The secretary is a member of the Cabinet. The current secretary is Francisco Tiu Laurel Jr., who assumed office on November 3, 2023.

== History ==
The Department of Agriculture had its spiritual beginnings when President Emilio Aguinaldo of the Revolutionary Government of the Philippines established the Department of Agriculture and Manufacturing on June 23, 1898. Jose Alejandrino was appointed the first secretary.

=== American colonial government ===
In 1901, under the American colonial government, priority was given to the development of other agricultural products, such as rice and other basic commodities, as well as fishing, forestry, and mining. This new focus necessitated the establishment of the Insular Bureau of Agriculture. This bureau was put under the Department of the Interior through Act No. 271 of the Philippine Legislature, and was later put under the supervision of the Department of Public Instruction in 1910.

The first Filipino to head the Bureau of Agriculture was Adriano Hernández, himself a practicing farmer.

The Bureau of Agriculture grew rapidly until it was abolished by the enactment of Act No. 2666, otherwise known as An Act to Re-organize the Executive Department of the Government of the Philippine Islands, on November 18, 1916, and was implemented on January 1, 1917. This act provided for the establishment of the Department of Agriculture and Natural Resources (DANR), which would take over direct executive control, direction, and supervision of the Bureaus of Agriculture, Forestry, Lands, Science, and Weather, as well as all matters concerning hunting, fisheries, sponges and other sea products, and such others as may be assigned to it by law.

By virtue of another reorganization (as per Act No. 4007) in 1932, the DANR became the Department of Agriculture and Commerce. The Bureau of Commerce, which used to be under the Department of Commerce and Communication, was placed under the reorganized department.

In 1942, while the Commonwealth government was in exile, the department was re-organized again, becoming the Department of Finance, Agriculture and Commerce. Upon the resumption of the commonwealth in February 1945, it became the Department of Justice, Agriculture and Commerce, and then back to being the Department of Agriculture and Commerce in December the same year.

=== Post-independence ===
In 1947, the agriculture department was renamed again as the Department of Agriculture and Natural Resources by virtue of Executive Order No. 94. The Bureau of Commerce, among others, was incorporated to the newly created Department of Commerce and Industry.

On September 14, 1959, the DANR moved to its current building in Diliman, Quezon City from the Agrifina Circle (now the Teodoro Valencia Circle) in Manila.

By virtue of Presidential Decree No. 461, the DANR was split in May 1974 into two departments: the Department of Agriculture and the Department of Natural Resources (now the DENR).

After the shift to the parliamentary system in 1978, all departments were changed to ministries. Thus, the office became the Ministry of Agriculture and Food until 1987, when the office's name was reverted to the Department of Agriculture by Executive Order No. 116.

The same executive order mandated the DA to promote agricultural development by providing the policy framework, public investment, and support services, which are needed for domestic and export-oriented business enterprises. Guided by the principle that agriculture is business, the DA implemented policy and institutional reforms that freed the agriculture markets, enabling farmers to enjoy higher farmgate prices. These reforms included the dismantling of agricultural monopolies and the elimination of agricultural taxes. Reforms of the agricultural credit system, such as the phase-out of the direct lending scheme, were also initiated.

In May 2014, pursuant to Executive Order No. 165, four agencies representing three-quarters of the DA's budget — the Fertilizer and Pesticide Authority, the National Food Authority, the National Irrigation Administration, and the Philippine Coconut Authority — were removed from DA control. This was part of the anti-corruption reforms which followed the pork barrel scam. The four agencies are now direct subjects of the Office of the President, where they are overseen by the Presidential Assistant for Food Security and Agricultural Modernization.

== Organizational structure ==
The department is headed by the Secretary of Agriculture, with the following undersecretaries and assistant secretaries:

- Senior Undersecretary
- Undersecretary for Finance
- Undersecretary for Administration
- Undersecretary for Policy, Planning and Regulations
- Undersecretary for Fisheries
- Undersecretary for Special Concerns and for the Bangsamoro Autonomous Region in Muslim Mindanao (BARMM)
- Undersecretary for Rice Industry Development
- Assistant Secretary/Chief of Staff, Office of the Secretary
- Assistant Secretary for Consumer Affairs and DA Spokesperson
- Assistant Secretary for DA Inspectorate and Enforcement
- Assistant Secretary for Finance
- Assistant Secretary for Legislative Affairs and DA Legislative Liaison Officer
- Assistant Secretary for Operations
- Assistant Secretary for Policy Research and Development
- Assistant Secretary for Regulations
- Assistant Secretary for Mindanao

Under the Office of the Secretary are the following offices and services:

- Administrative Service
- Agribusiness and Marketing Assistance Service
- Field Operations Service
- Financial and Management Service
- Information and Communications Technology Service
- Internal Audit Service
- Legal Service
- Planning Service
- Policy Research Service
- Project Development Service

A regional executive director is assigned to each of the 17 regions of the Philippines.

On January 25, 2024, Francisco Tiu Laurel Jr. designated former National Food Authority official Roger Navarro as DA undersecretary for operations, as acting undersecretary for rice industry development, replacing Leocadio Sebastian. Navarro was also named officer-in-charge (OIC) of the Office of the National Project Director, Philippine Rural Development Project and Office of the Assistant Secretary for Operations. Tiu Laurel Jr. appointed Arnel de Mesa as the full-time spokesman for the DA, promoted his chief of staff, John Alvin F. Balagbag, as undersecretary and lawyer Roland Tulay as OIC of the Office of the Assistant Secretary for Administration and Office of the Undersecretary for Administration. Also appointed were DA’s representatives to the technical working group drafting the implementing rules and regulations of The Internet Transactions Act of 2023 Director IV Honorio Flameno Ph. D. and Information Technology Officer III Xerxees Remorozo.

=== Bureaus ===
The DA is composed of eight bureaus, namely:

- Agricultural Training Institute (ATI)
- Bureau of Agricultural and Fisheries Product Standards (BAFS), formerly known as Bureau of Agricultural and Fisheries Product Standards (BAFPS) until the enactment of R.A. No. 10601.
- Bureau of Animal Industry (BAI)
- Bureau of Agricultural Research (BAR)
- Bureau of Fisheries and Aquatic Resources (BFAR)
- Bureau of Plant Industry (BPI)
- Bureau of Soils and Water Management (BSWM)
- Bureau of Agricultural and Fisheries Engineering (BAFE), new bureau under R.A. No. 10601

Formerly-attached bureaus:

- Bureau of Agricultural Statistics (BAS), now under the Philippine Statistics Authority
- Agriculture of Security Fumigation and Fertilizer for Food Philippines

== Attached agencies ==
The following agencies, corporations and councils are attached to the DA for policy and program coordination:

- Agricultural Credit and Policy Council (ACPC)
- Philippine Fiber Industry Development Authority (PhilFIDA)
- National Dairy Authority (NDA)
- National Fisheries Research and Development Institute (NFRDI)
- National Meat Inspection Service (NMIS)
- National Tobacco Administration (NTA)
- Philippine Carabao Center (PCC)
- Philippine Council for Agriculture and Fisheries (PCAF)
- Philippine Center for Postharvest Development and Mechanization (PHilMech)
- Philippine Fisheries Development Authority (PFDA)
- Philippine Rice Research Institute (Philrice)
- Southeast Asian Fisheries Development Center (SEAFDEC)
- Sugar Regulatory Administration (SRA)
- Fertilizer and Pesticide Authority (FPA)
- National Food Authority (NFA)
- Philippine Coconut Authority (PCA)
- National Irrigation Administration (NIA)
- Philippine Crop Insurance Corporation (PCIC)

Formerly-attached agencies:

- Cotton Development Administration (CODA) (merged with Fiber Industry Development Authority)
- Philippine Crop Insurance Corporation (PCIC) (transferred to Department of Finance)

== See also ==
- Department of Agrarian Reform
- Land reform in the Philippines

General:

- Agriculture in the Philippines
