= List of Philippine government and military acronyms =

List of initialisms, acronyms ("a word made from parts of the full name's words, pronounceable"), and other abbreviations used by the government and the military of the Philippines. Note that this list is intended to be specific to the Philippine government and military—other nations will have their own acronyms.

== 0–9 ==
- 4Ps – Pantawid Pamilyang Pilipino Program

== A ==
- AAIIBP – Al-Amanah Islamic Investment Bank of the Philippines
- ACPC – Agricultural Credit Policy Council
- AFAB - Authority of the Freeport Area of Bataan
- AFP – Armed Forces of the Philippines
- AFPCES – Armed Forces of the Philippines Commissary and Exchange Service
- AFPCGSC – Armed Forces of the Philippines Command and General Staff College
- AIR RESCOM – Philippine Air Force Reserve Command
- AMLC – Anti-Money Laundering Council
- ARESCOM – Philippine Army Reserve Command
- ARG – Armed Forces of the Philippines Reserve Command Affiliate Reserve Group
- ASEAN – Association of Southeast Asian Nations
- ATG – Armed Forces of the Philippines Reserve Command Training Group
- ATI – Agricultural Training Institute
- ASCOM – Philippine Army Support Command

== B ==
- BAFPS – Bureau of Agricultural and Fisheries Product Standards
- BAI – Bureau of Animal Industry
- BAR – Bureau of Agricultural Research
- BAS – Bureau of Agricultural Statistics
- BCDA – Bases Conversion and Development Authority
- BCS – Bureau of Communications Services
- BFAR – Bureau of Fisheries and Aquatic Resources
- BFP – Bureau of Fire Protection
- BI – Bureau of Immigration
- BIR – Bureau of Internal Revenue
- BJMP – Bureau of Jail Management and Penology
- BLE – Bureau of Local Employment
- BLGF – Bureau of Local Government Finance
- BLR – Bureau of Labor Relations
- BMB – Biodiversity Management Bureau
- BOC – Bureau of Customs
- BON – Philippine Board of Nursing
- BPI – Bureau of Plant Industry
- BPRE – Bureau of Post-Harvest Research and Extension
- BSP – Bangko Sentral ng Pilipinas
- BSWM – Bureau of Soils and Water Management
- BTr – Bureau of the Treasury
- BuCor – Bureau of Corrections

== C ==
- CA – Commission on Appointments
- CA – Court of Appeals
- CAAP – Civil Aviation Authority of the Philippines
- CAB – Civil Aeronautics Board
- CCC – Climate Change Commission
- CCP – Cultural Center of the Philippines
- CDA – Cooperative Development Authority
- CGPA – Commanding General Philippine Army
- CEISS-AFP – Armed Forces of the Philippines Communications, Electronics and Information Systems Service
- CEZA – Cagayan Economic Zone Authority
- CFO – Commission on Filipinos Overseas
- CHED – Commission on Higher Education
- CHR – Commission on Human Rights
- CIAP – Construction Industry Authority of the Philippines
- CITEM – Center for International Trade Expositions and Missions
- COA – Commission on Audit
- COCAFM – Congressional Oversight Committee on Agricultural and Fisheries Modernization
- CODA – Cotton Development Administration
- COMELEC – Commission on Elections
- CRS-AFP – Armed Forces of the Philippines Civil Relations Service
- CSC – Civil Service Commission
- CTA – Court of Tax Appeals

== D ==
- DA – Department of Agriculture
- DAR – Department of Agrarian Reform
- DBM – Department of Budget and Management
- DBP – Development Bank of the Philippines
- DDB – Dangerous Drugs Board
- DENR – Department of Environment and Natural Resources
- DepEd – Department of Education
- DFA – Department of Foreign Affairs
- DHSUD – Department of Human Settlements and Urban Development
- DICT – Department of Information and Communications Technology
- DILG – Department of the Interior and Local Government
- DND – Department of National Defense
- DOE – Department of Energy
- DOF – Department of Finance
- DOH – Department of Health
- DOJ – Department of Justice
- DOLE – Department of Labor and Employment
- DOST – Department of Science and Technology
- DOT – Department of Tourism
- DOTr – Department of Transportation
- DPWH – Department of Public Works and Highways
- DSWD – Department of Social Welfare and Development
- DTI – Department of Trade and Industry

== E ==
- EMC – Eastern Mindanao Command
- ECC – Employees' Compensation Commission
- ECCD Council – Early Childhood Care and Development Council
- EMB – Environmental Management Bureau
- ERC – Energy Regulatory Commission

== F ==
- FDA – Food and Drug Administration
- FDCP – Film Development Council of the Philippines
- FIDA – Fiber Industry Development Authority
- FMB – Forest Management Bureau
- FNRI – Food and Nutrition Research Institute
- FPA – Fertilizer and Pesticide Authority
- FSI – Foreign Service Institute

== G ==
- GAB – Games and Amusements Board
- GCG – Governance Commission for Government Owned or Controlled Corporations
- GHQ-AFP – Armed Forces of the Philippines General Headquarters and Headquarters Service Command
- GOCC – Government-owned and controlled corporation
- GPPB – Government Procurement Policy Board
- GSIS – Government Service Insurance System

== H ==
- HHSSG – Headquarters & Headquarters Service Support Group
- HLURB – Housing and Land Use Regulatory Board (defunct)
- HRET – House of Representatives Electoral Tribunal
- HUDCC – Housing and Urban Development Coordinating Council (defunct)

== I ==
- IA – Intramuros Administration
- IACAT – Inter-Agency Council Against Trafficking
- IBP – Integrated Bar of the Philippines
- ICAB – Inter-Country Adoption Board
- ICC – Investment Coordination Committee
- IDC – Industry Development Council
- IPOPHL – Intellectual Property Office of the Philippines
- IRA – Internal Revenue Allotment
- ITECC – Information Technology and Electronic Commerce Council

== J ==
- JBC – Judicial and Bar Council
- JELACC – Judicial Executive Legislative Advisory and Consultative Council
- JSOG – Armed Forces of the Philippines Joint Special Operations Group
- JTF-NCR – Armed Forces of the Philippines Joint Task Force-National Capital Region

== K ==
- KK – Katipunan ng Kabataan
- KWF – Komisyon sa Wikang Filipino

== L ==
- LBP – Land Bank of the Philippines
- LBP – League of Barangays of the Philippines
- LCP – League of Cities of the Philippines
- LCP – Lung Center of the Philippines
- LEDAC – Legislative-Executive Development Advisory Council
- LGU – Local Government Unit
- LLDA – Laguna Lake Development Authority
- LMB – Land Management Bureau
- LMP – League of Municipalities of the Philippines
- LPP – League of Provinces of the Philippines
- LRA – Land Registration Authority
- LRTA – Light Rail Transit Authority
- LTFRB – Land Transportation Franchising and Regulatory Board
- LTO – Land Transportation Office
- LWUA – Local Water Utilities Administration

== M ==
- MARINA – Maritime Industry Authority
- MCIAA – Mactan Cebu International Airport Authority
- MDFO – Municipal Development Fund Office
- MGB – Mines and Geosciences Bureau
- MIAA – Manila International Airport Authority
- MinDA – Mindanao Development Authority
- MMDA – Metropolitan Manila Development Authority
- MTC – Maritime Training Council
- MTRCB – Movie and Television Review and Classification Board
- MWSS – Metropolitan Waterworks and Sewerage System
- MeTC – Metropolitan Trial Court
- MTC – Municipal Trial Court
- MTCC – Municipal Trial Court in Cities
- MCTC – Municipal Circuit Trial Court

== N ==
- NACTAG – National Counter-Terrorism Action Group
- NAFC – National Agricultural and Fishery Council
- NAIA – Ninoy Aquino International Airport
- NAMRIA – National Mapping and Resource Information Authority
- NAPC – National Anti-Poverty Commission
- NAPOLCOM – National Police Commission
- NAPOCOR/NPC – National Power Corporation
- NAST – National Academy of Science and Technology
- NAVFOREASTMIN – Naval Forces Eastern Mindanao
- NAVFORRESNCR – Naval Forces Reserve — National Capital Region
- NAVRESCOM – Philippine Navy Reserve Command
- NAVSOCOM – Naval Special Operations Command
- NBDB – National Book Development Board
- NBI – National Bureau of Investigation
- NCC – National Competitiveness Council
- NCC – National Computer Center (defunct)
- NCCA – National Commission for Culture and the Arts
- NCDA – National Council on Disability Affairs
- NCIP – National Commission on Indigenous Peoples
- NCMF – National Commission on Muslim Filipinos
- NCPAM – National Center for Pharmaceutical Access and Management
- NCRCom – National Capital Regional Command
- NCRRCDG – National Capital Region Regional Community Defense Group
- NDCP – National Defense College of the Philippines
- NDRRMC – National Disaster Risk Reduction and Management Council
- NEA – National Electrification Administration
- NEDA – National Economic and Development Authority
- NFA – National Food Authority
- NHA – National Housing Authority
- NHCP – National Historical Commission of the Philippines
- NHTSPR – National Household Targeting System for Poverty Reduction
- NIA – National Irrigation Administration
- NICA – National Intelligence Coordinating Agency
- NKTI – National Kidney and Transplant Institute
- NLP – National Library of the Philippines
- NLRC – National Labor Relations Commission
- NMP - National Maritime Polytechnic
- NNC – National Nutrition Council
- NoLCom – Northern Luzon Command
- NSB – National Seamen Board
- NSC – National Security Council
- NSCB – National Statistical Coordination Board
- NSRC – National Service Reserve Corps
- NSTP – National Service Training Program
- NSWMC – National Solid Waste Management Commission
- NTA – National Tobacco Administration
- NTC – National Telecommunications Commission
- NTRC – National Tax Research Center
- NWPC – National Wages and Productivity Commission
- NWRB – National Water Resources Board
- NYC – National Youth Commission

== O ==
- OCD – Office of Civil Defense
- ODA – Official Development Assistance
- OMB – Optical Media Board
- OPAPP – Office of the Presidential Adviser on the Peace Process
- OSETC – Office of the Special Envoy on Transnational Crime
- OSG – Office of the Solicitor General
- OTS – Office for Transportation Security
- OWWA – Overseas Workers Welfare Administration

== P ==
- PA – Philippine Army
- PADC – Philippine Aerospace Development Corporation
- PAF – Philippine Air Force
- PAGASA – Philippine Atmospheric, Geophysical and Astronomical Services Administration
- PAGCOR – Philippine Amusement and Gaming Corporation
- PAOCC – Presidential Anti-Organized Crime Commission
- PC – Philippine Constabulary
- PCA – Philippine Coconut Authority
- PCAANRRD – Philippine Council for Agriculture, Aquatic, and Natural Resources Research and Development
- PCDSPO – Presidential Communications Development and Strategic Planning Office
- PCG – Philippine Coast Guard
- PCGG – Presidential Commission on Good Government
- PCHRD – Philippine Council for Health Research and Development
- PCOO – Presidential Communications Operations Office
- PCSD – Palawan Council for Sustainable Development
- PCSD – Philippine Council for Sustainable Development
- PCSO – Philippine Charity Sweepstakes Office
- PCUP – Presidential Commission for the Urban Poor
- PCW – Philippine Commission on Women
- PDA – Partido Development Administration
- PDEA – Philippine Drug Enforcement Agency
- PDIC – Philippine Deposit Insurance Corporation
- PEFTOK – Philippine Expeditionary Forces to Korea
- PEZA – Philippine Economic Zone Authority
- PFC – Philippine Forest Corporation
- PGH – Philippine General Hospital
- PHC – Philippine Heart Center
- PHILCOA – Philippine Coconut Authority
- PHILEXIM – Philippine Export-Import Credit Agency
- PhilHealth – Philippine Health Insurance Corporation
- PHILRACOM – Philippine Racing Commission
- PhilRice – Philippine Rice Research Institute
- PHIVOLCS – Philippine Institute of Volcanology and Seismology
- PhlPost – Philippine Postal Corporation
- PIA – Philippine Information Agency
- PICC – Philippine International Convention Center
- PIDS – Philippine Institute for Development Studies
- PKOC-AFP – Armed Forces of the Philippines Peacekeeping Operations Center
- PMA – Philippine Military Academy
- PMC – Philippine Marine Corps
- PMO – Privatization and Management Office
- PN – Philippine Navy
- PNA – Philippines News Agency
- PNOC – Philippine National Oil Company
- PNP – Philippine National Police
- PNP-AVSEGROUP – Philippine National Police Aviation Security Group
- PNP-PMO – Philippine National Police Program Management Office
- PNR – Philippine National Railways
- PNRI – Philippine Nuclear Research Institute
- POEA – Philippine Overseas Employment Administration
- POPCOM – Commission on Population
- PPA – Parole and Probation Administration
- PPA – Philippine Ports Authority
- PPP – Public-Private Partnership
- PPSB – Philippine Postal Savings Bank
- PRA – Philippine Reclamation Authority
- PRA – Philippine Retirement Authority
- PRC – Professional Regulation Commission
- PRECUP – Philippine Registry of Cultural Property
- PREGINET – Philippine Research, Education and Government Information Network
- PRRC – Pasig River Rehabilitation Commission
- PSA – Philippine Statistics Authority
- PSALM - Power Sector Assets and Liabilities Management
- PSC – Philippine Sports Commission
- PSG – Presidential Security Group
- PTA – Philippine Tourism Authority
- PTTC – Philippine Trade Training Center
- PVAO – Philippine Veterans Affairs Office

== R ==
- RDC – Regional Development Council
- RESCOM – Armed Forces of the Philippines Reserve Command
- RITM – Research Institute for Tropical Medicine
- RTC – Regional Trial Court
- RTVM – Radio Television Malacañang

== S ==
- SAF – Special Action Force
- SALN – Statement of Assets, Liabilities and Net worth
- SARU – Search and Rescue Unit
- SB – Sandiganbayan
- SBMA – Subic Bay Metropolitan Authority
- SC – Supreme Court
- SEC – Securities and Exchange Commission
- SET – Senate Electoral Tribunal
- SK – Sangguniang Kabataan
- SOCOM – Special Operations Command
- SoLCom – Southern Luzon Command
- SONA – State of the Nation Address
- SPDA – Southern Philippines Development Authority
- SRA – Sugar Regulatory Administration
- SRU – Special Reaction Unit
- SSS – Social Security System

== T ==
- TC – Tariff Commission
- TESDA – Technical Education and Skills Development Authority
- TIEZA – Tourism Infrastructure and Enterprise Zone Authority
- TPB – Tourism Promotions Board
- TRADOC – Training and Doctrine Command
- TRANSCO – National Transmission Corporation
- TRB – Toll Regulatory Board
- TSRG – Armed Forces of the Philippines Reserve Command Technical Services Reserve Group

== U ==
- UCT – Unconditional Cash Transfer
- UMPIL – Unyon ng mga Manunulat sa Pilipinas
- UNESCO - United Nations Educational, Scientific and Cultural Organization

== V ==
- VMMC – Veterans Memorial Medical Center

== W ==
- WestCom – Western Command
- WestMinCom – Western Mindanao Command

== Z ==
- ZFA – Zamboanga Freeport Authority

== See also ==
- List of acronyms in the Philippines
- List of Philippine legal terms
