= List of government and military acronyms =

There are various lists of government and military acronyms, expressions and slang:

- List of military slang terms
- List of established military terms
- List of slang terms for federal agents
- Glossary of military abbreviations

by country

- Grande Armée slang (France of the Napoleonic Era)
- Glossary of German military terms (Germany)
- List of Philippine government and military acronyms

United States / American English

- List of U.S. government and military acronyms
  - List of United States Marine Corps acronyms and expressions
  - List of U.S. Navy acronyms and expressions
  - List of U.S. Air Force acronyms and expressions
  - Nicknames of United States Army divisions

== See also ==
- The dictionary definition of Appendix:Canadian English military slang at Wiktionary
- The dictionary definition of Appendix:Australian English military slang at Wiktionary
