= 15th Infantry Division (Philippines) =

15th Infantry Division (Ready Reserve)
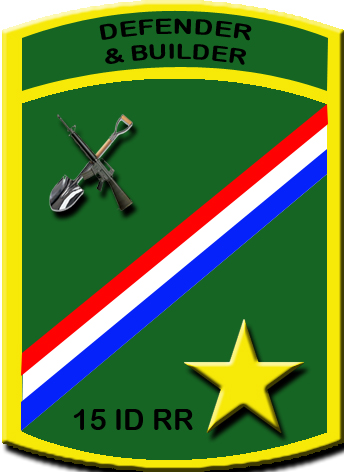
- Unit Seal of the 15th Infantry Division (Ready Reserve)
- Active: 10 July 2006 – Present
- Country: Philippines
- Allegiance: Republic of the Philippines
- Branch: Philippine Army
- Type: Army Reserve; Light Infantry Division
- Role: performs multiple military roles in Conventional and Unconventional Warfare, Humanitarian Assistance and Disaster Response (HA/DR), and Civil-Military Operations (CMO)
- Size: 5 Brigades, 15 Battalions. Total is 6,320 trained and operational citizen-soldiers
- Part of: Philippine Army Reserve Command (Since 2006)
- Garrison/HQ: NCRRCDG Cpd, Fort Andres Bonifacio, Taguig City
- Nickname(s): "Defender & Builder Division" "Division Defensor y Constuctor"
- Motto(s): "Defender & Builder" "Defensor y Constuctor"
- Mascot(s): Crossed Rifle & Shovel
- Anniversaries: 10 July 2006
- Decorations: Philippine Republic Presidential Unit Citation Badge
- Battle honours: None

Commanders
- Current commander: BGen Marcelo B Javier Jr (RES) AFP
- Notable commanders: BGen Marcelo B Javier Jr (RES) AFP

Insignia
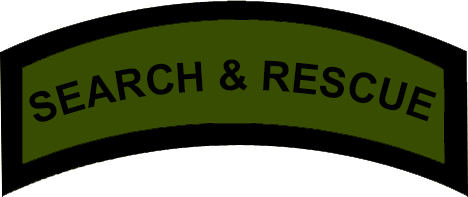
- Search and Rescue Tab

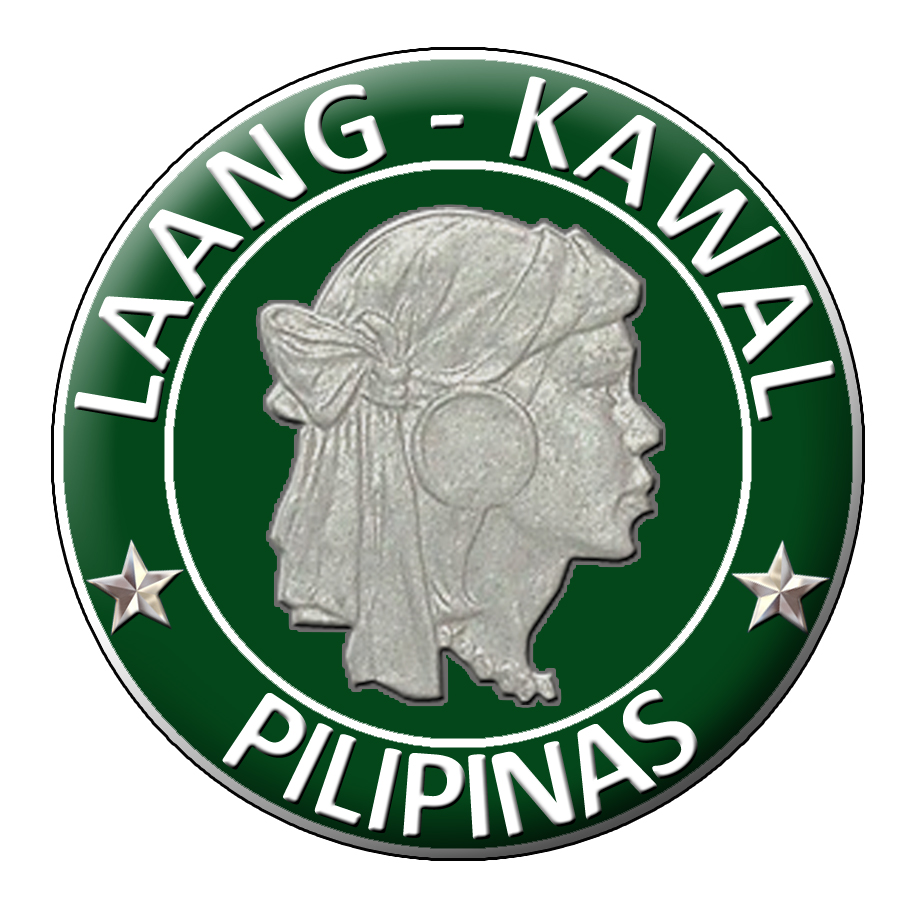
- Laang Kawal Seal

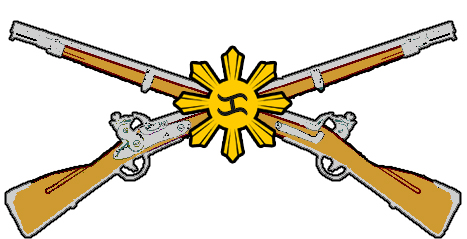
- Philippine Army Infantry Branch Insignia

The 15th Infantry Division (Ready Reserve), Philippine Army, known as the Defender & Builder Division, is one of the Reserve Command's ready reserve infantry divisions.

The unit specializes in Urban Warfare, Urban Search and Rescue, Humanitarian Assistance and Disaster Relief, and Civil-Military Operations. It operates in the National Capital Region.

== History ==
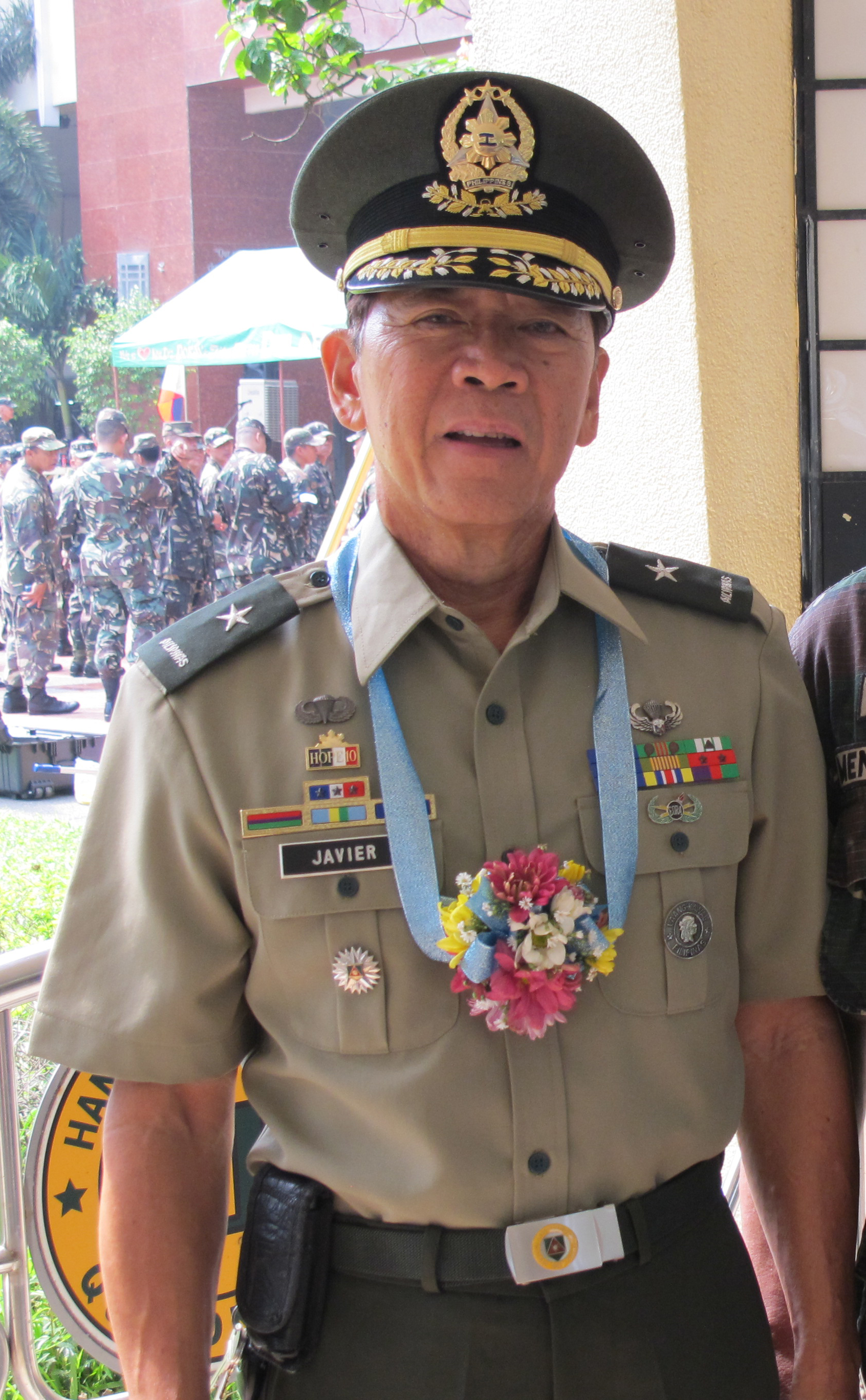
Brigadier General Marcelo B Javier Jr (RES) AFP; the commanding general of the 15th Infantry Division (Ready Reserve).

The Philippine Army felt the need to re-organize its reserve units in the National Capital Region (NCR) when the 9th Infantry Division (Ready Reserve) was deactivated and the newly created regular infantry division (9ID) took its numerical designation.

The Commission on Appointments, confirmed the promotion of Colonel Javier Jr to brigadier general on 21 September 2012.

On 3 December 2012, Colonel Javier Jr was sworn in as a brigadier general by President Benigno S. Aquino III, together with other newly promoted generals of the AFP at the Rizal Hall of Malacañang Palace.

The division, since its activation, has performed countless Civil-Military Operations, Search and Rescue Operations and directly assist then AFP National Capital Regional Command and now the AFP Joint Task Force-National Capital Region in fulfilling its mandate of ensuring peace and order within the National Capital Region.

== Mission ==
- Base for expansion of the Regular Force in the event of war, invasion or rebellion within its AOP.
- Assist the Government in Relief and Rescue Operations in the event of Calamities or Disasters.
- Assist the Government in Socio-economic development and environmental concerns.
- Assist in the operation and maintenance of essential government and private utilities (e.g. power, telecommunications, water).

== Vision ==
A well disciplined, organized, trained and non-partisan citizen army, able to augment the regular force and respond to national disasters and threats to national security, during peacetime, war or rebellion mandated to perform tasks of Military Operations Other Than War (MOOTW).

== Lineage of Commanding Officers ==
- COL RAFAEL M ALUNAN III (RES) PA (during operational term as 9th Infantry Division) (2002 – 10 Jul 06)
- BGEN MARCELO B JAVIER JR (RES) AFP – (10 Jul 06 – PRESENT)

== Organization ==
The following are the Base/Brigade units that are under the 15th Infantry Division (RR).

=== Base Units ===
- Headquarters & Headquarters Service Battalion (HHSBn)
- Service Support Battalion (SSBn)
- Military Police Company (MP Coy)
- Engineering Combat Battalion (ECBn)
- Reconnaissance Battalion (Recon Bn)
- Military Intelligence Battalion (MIBn)
- Search and Rescue Unit (SARU)
- Mechanized Infantry Battalion (MBn) (Proposed)

=== Line Units ===
- 1501st Infantry Brigade (Ready Reserve)
- 1502nd Infantry Brigade (Ready Reserve)
- 1503rd Infantry Brigade (Ready Reserve)
- 1504th Infantry Brigade (Ready Reserve)
- 1505th Infantry Brigade (Ready Reserve)

== Trainings ==
The following are division-level special trainings undertaken by the unit soldiers:

- Basic Citizen Military Training
- Military Orientation Training
- Pre-Deployment Training
- Disaster Emergency Assistance and Rescue Training
- High Angle Rescue Training
- Mountain Search and Rescue Training
- Water Search and Rescue Training
- Urban Search and Rescue Training
- Civil Military Operations Orientation Training
- Special Forces Operations Orientation Training
- Field Artillery Orientation Training
- Combat Engineering Orientation Training
- Small Unit Tactics Training
- VIP Security Training
- Motorcycle Unit Training
- Combat Lifesaver Training
- Reservist Intelligence Collection Training
- Military Intelligence and Security Training
- Counterintelligence Refresher Course
- Military Intelligence Agent Training
- Explosive Ordnance Reconnaissance Agent cross-trained with Counter Improvised Explosive Device

Training is supervised and course-directed by reserve officers who are occupational specialty qualified, former active duty members, and already incorporated in the ready reserve force.

Unit soldiers also undertake regular courses from the AFP and regular Army TRADOC and special schools. There are reservists who are already authorized to don infantry, ordnance, civil military operations, psychological operations and airborne badges. The unit reservists also undertake specialized trainings from other government agencies.

Many unit officers and personnel have already served the fixed two-year called-to-active-duty tour in the regular force. As a modern reserve force, many possess advanced degrees, technical and professional certifications that fill skill gaps in the regular force. Most of the officers and personnel are also employed in local government administration and private and government security services. Reservists of the unit are considered excellent force multipliers in internal security and external defense operations.

== Operations ==
- Various Civil-Military Operations
- Various Internal Security Intelligence and Counterintelligence Operations
- Various National-level Disaster Field Demonstrations and Exercises
- Various Disaster Relief and Rehabilitation Operations
- Rescue and Relief Operations TS Ondoy & Pepeng (September – October 2010)
- Rescue and Relief Operations TS Sendong (October 2011)
- Rescue and Relief Operations West Monsoon HABAGAT (August 2012)
- Intelligence Support for Counter Narcotics Operations in various cities of Metro Manila
- Rescue and Relief Operations Super Typhoon Yolanda (November 2013)
- Rescue and Relief Operations (TF Glenda) (16 Jul 14 – 17 Jul 14)
- Rescue and Relief Operations (TF Mario) (19 Sep 14 – 21 Sep 14)

== Awards and decorations ==
=== Campaign streamers ===
Award Streamer	Streamer Name	Operation	Date Awarded	Reference
	Presidential Unit Citation Badge	SAR/DRR Ops, TS Ketsana & TS Parma	4 February 2010	General Orders No. 112, GHQ-AFP, dtd 4 Feb '10
	Presidential Unit Citation Badge	General Elections, Philippines	1 July 2010	General Orders No. 641, GHQ-AFP, dtd 1 July '10

=== Badges ===
Military Badge	Badge Name	Operation	Date Awarded	Reference
	AFP Election Duty Badge	General Elections, Philippines	21 May 2010	General Orders No. 513, GHQ-AFP, dtd 21 May '10

== Gallery ==
The 15th Infantry Division

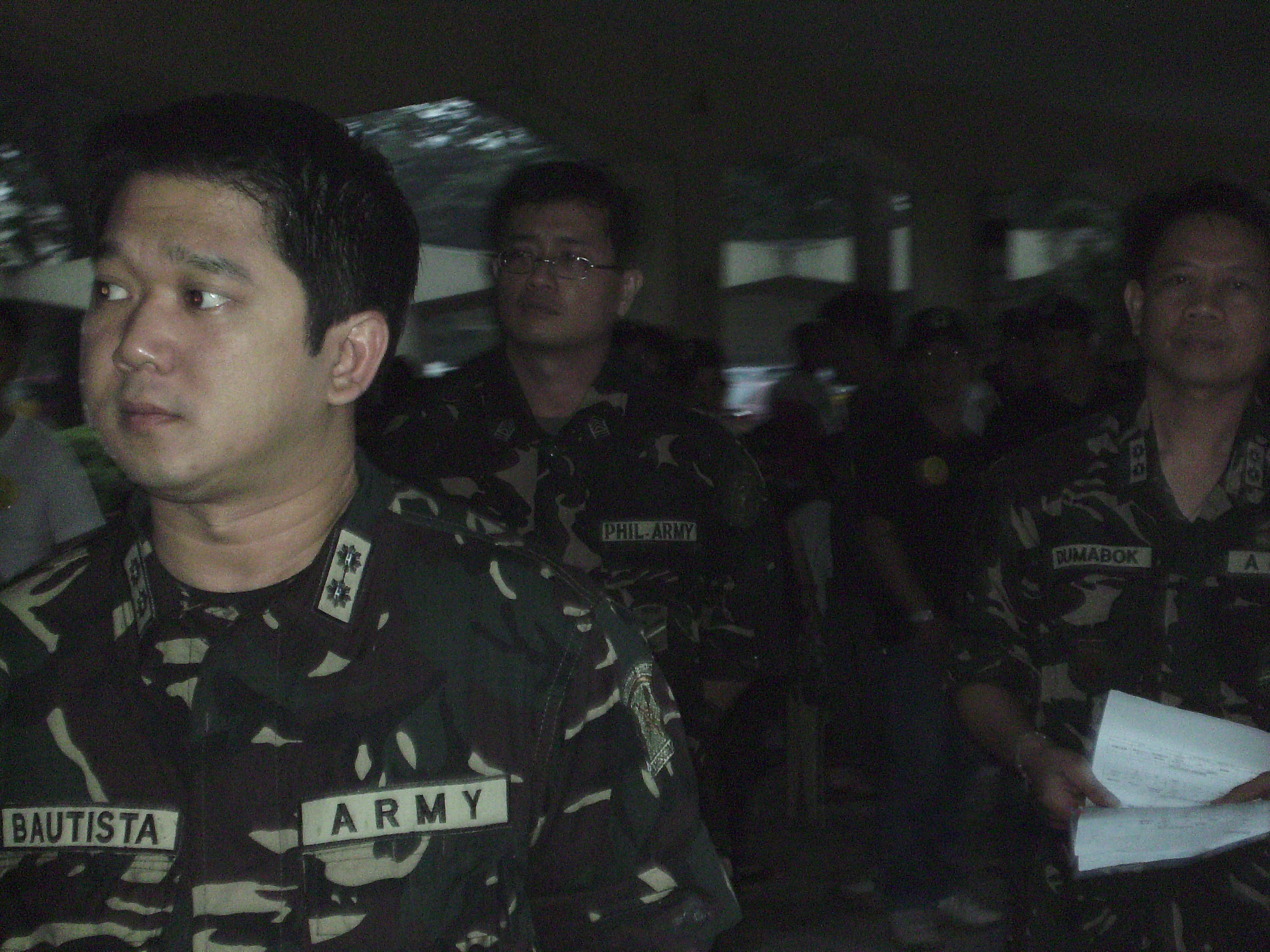
LTC HERBERT M BAUTISTA MNSA (GSC) RES PA together with LTC SAL G DUMABOK MNSA (RES) GSC PA, and then TSg Virgilio S Ferrer II (Res) PA inspect the troops prior to deployment for Rehabilitation Operations on areas affected by TS Ketsana.

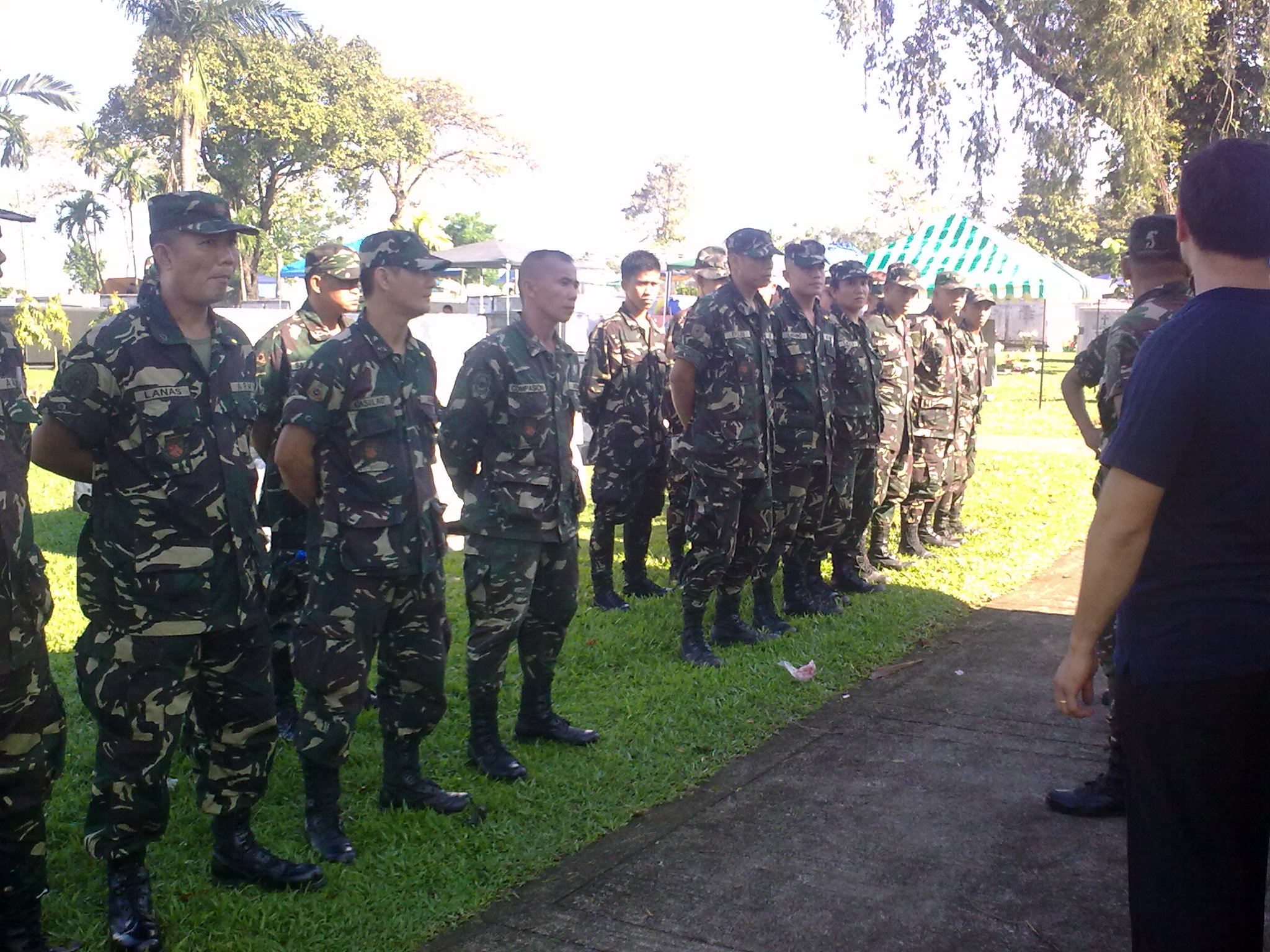
TSg Virgilio S Ferrer II (Res) PA; 20IB(RR) Sergeant Major, briefs the personnel assigned for deployment during Security Operations at Holy Cross Memorial Park, Quezon City (Undas 2009).

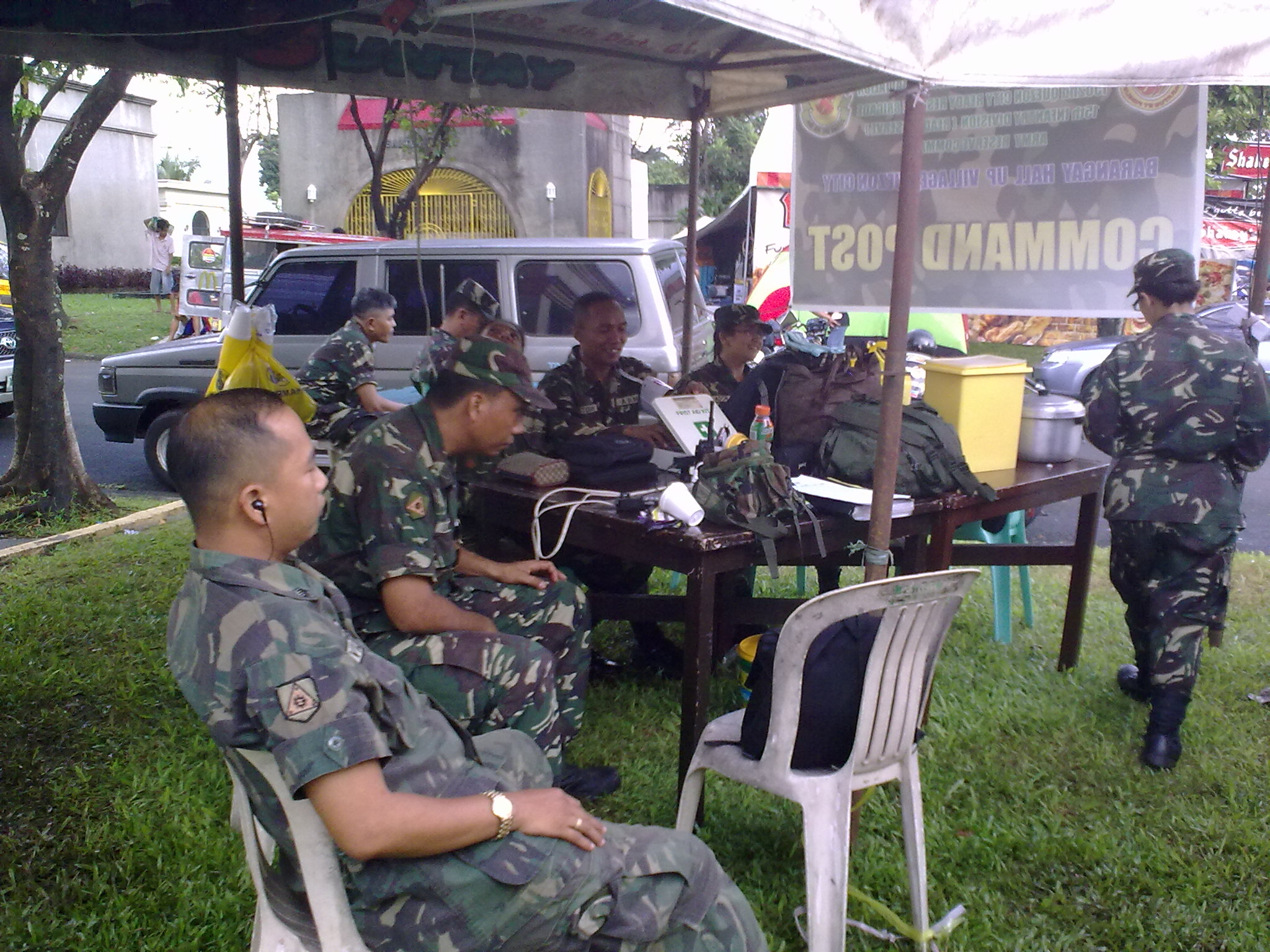
Reservists from the HHC, 1502IBDE(RR) and 201IB(RR) staffed the Tactical Command Post at the Holy Cross Memorial Park in San Bartolome, Novaliches, Quezon City during (Undas 2010) Security Operations.

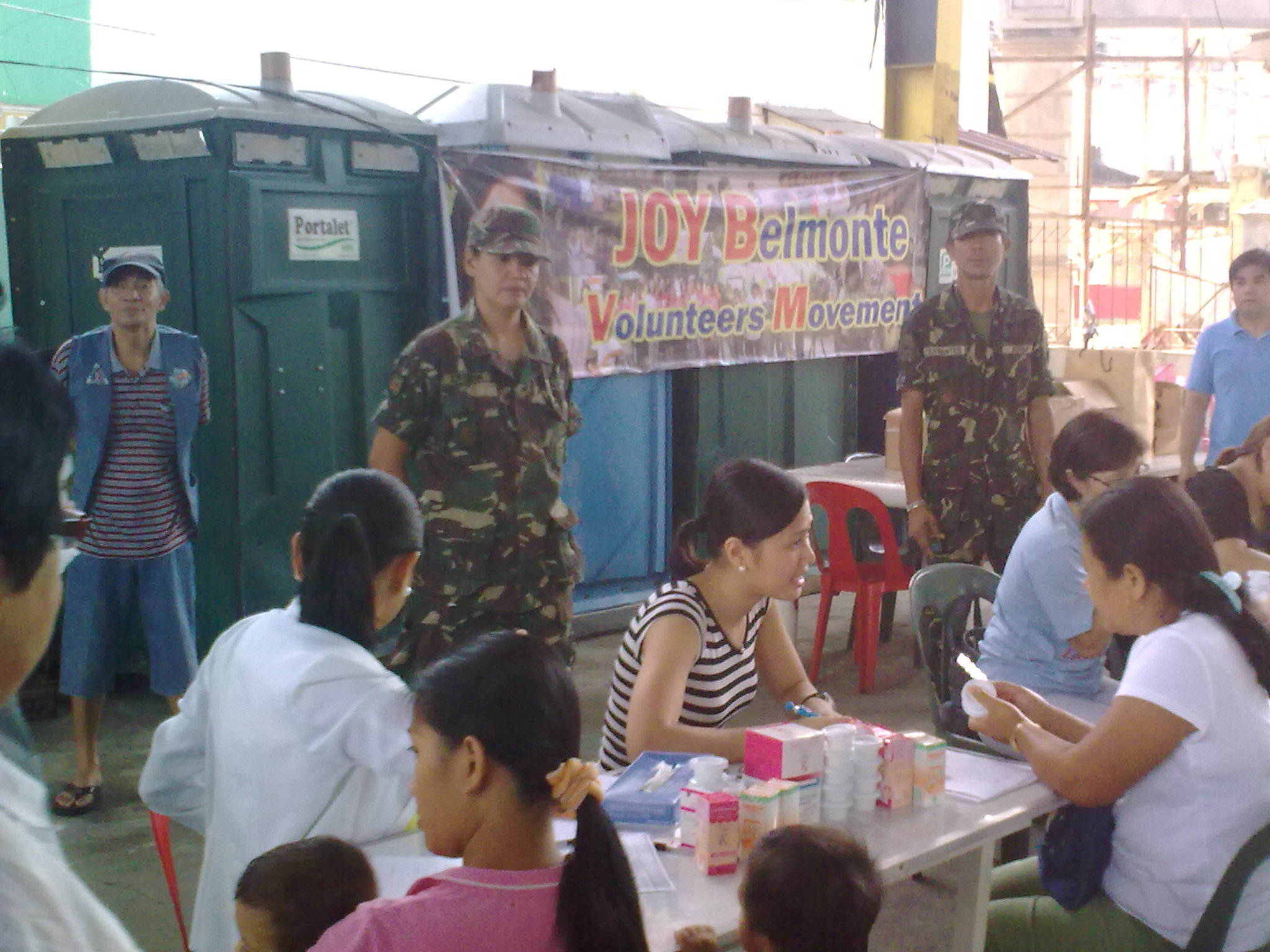
Reservists provide security and assist medical personnel during the conduct of Medical and Dental Civic-Action Program (MEDCAP) at Bgy Nagkaisang Nayon, QC.

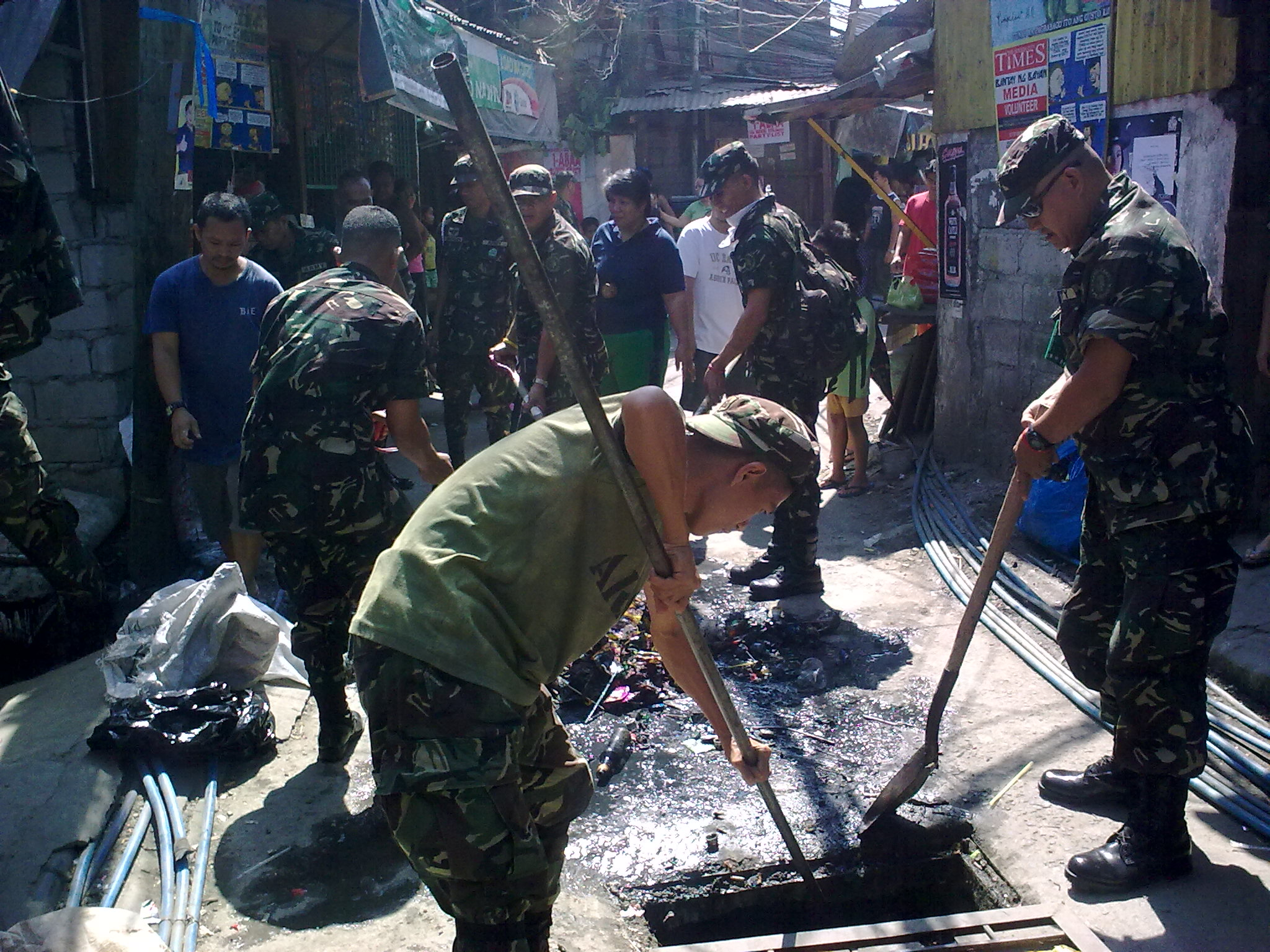
Army Reservists from the 201IB(RR) conduct Clean-up Drive (CMO) at Bgy Old Capitol Site, QC.

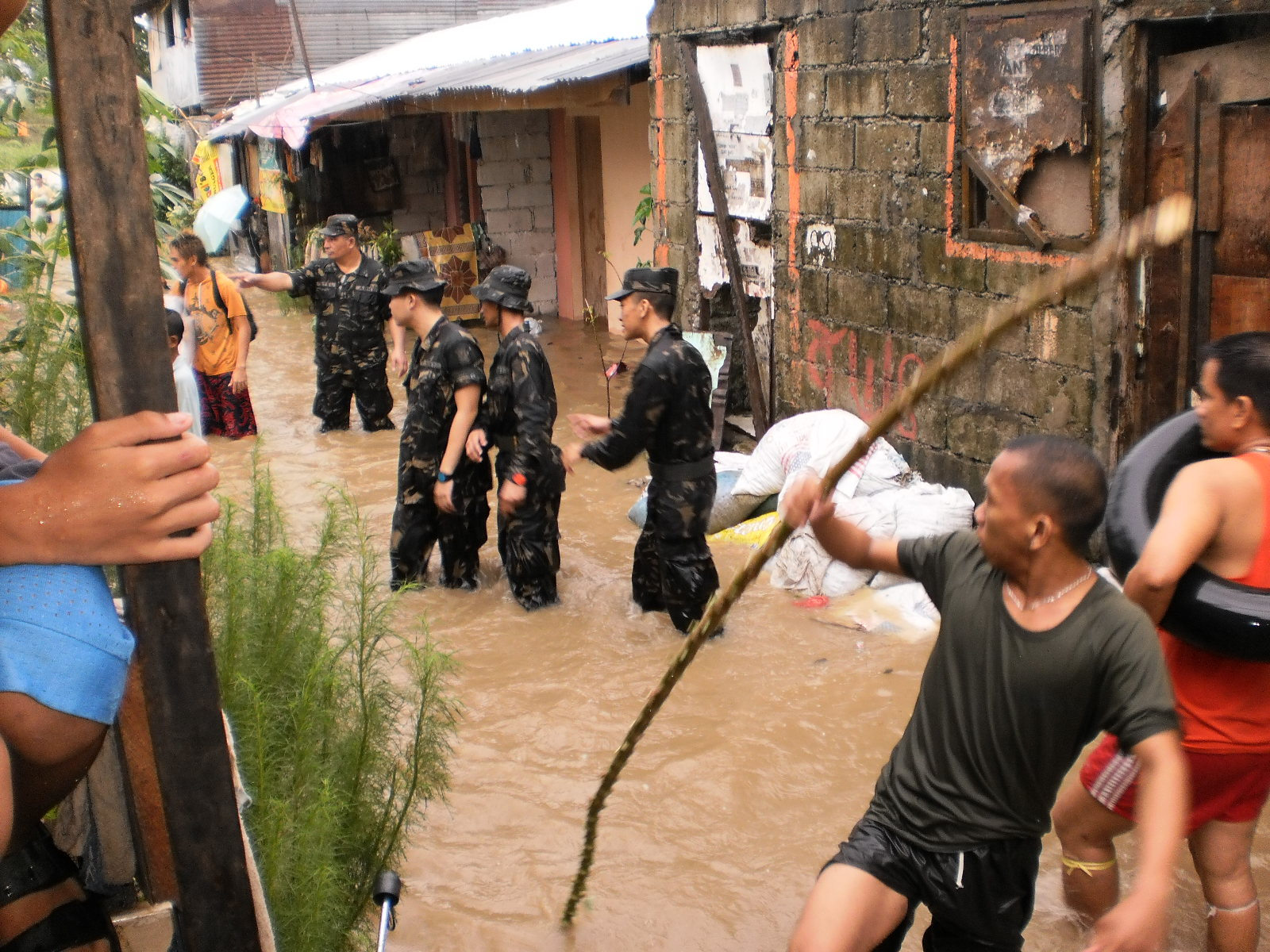
QC Reservists conduct rescue operations at Bgy Bagong Silangan, QC during the height of torrential rains brought by Southwest Monsoon in June 2011.

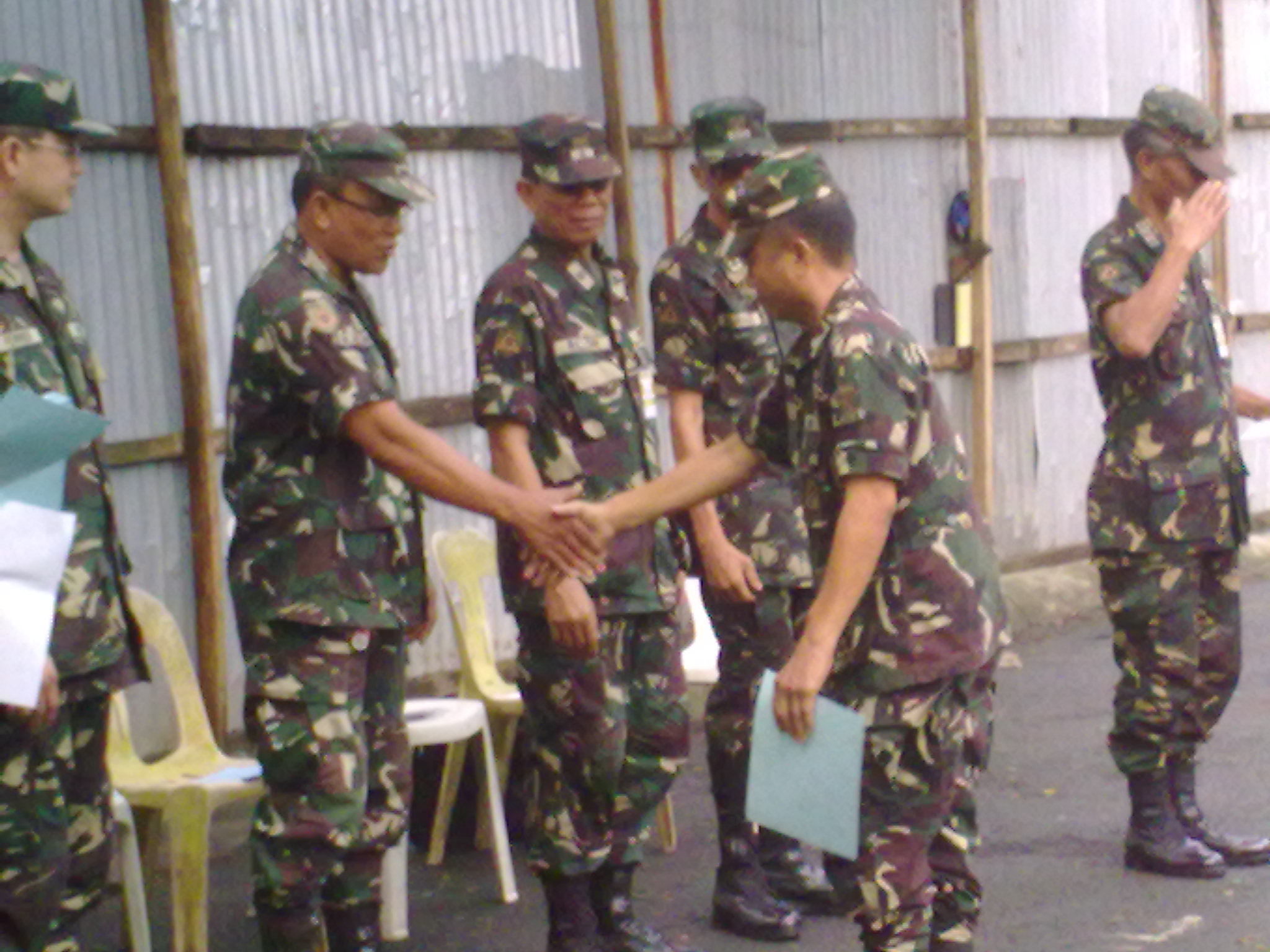
QC Reservists receive their certificates from COL Danilo P Gomez QMS (GSC) PA; 1302CDC Commanding Officer.

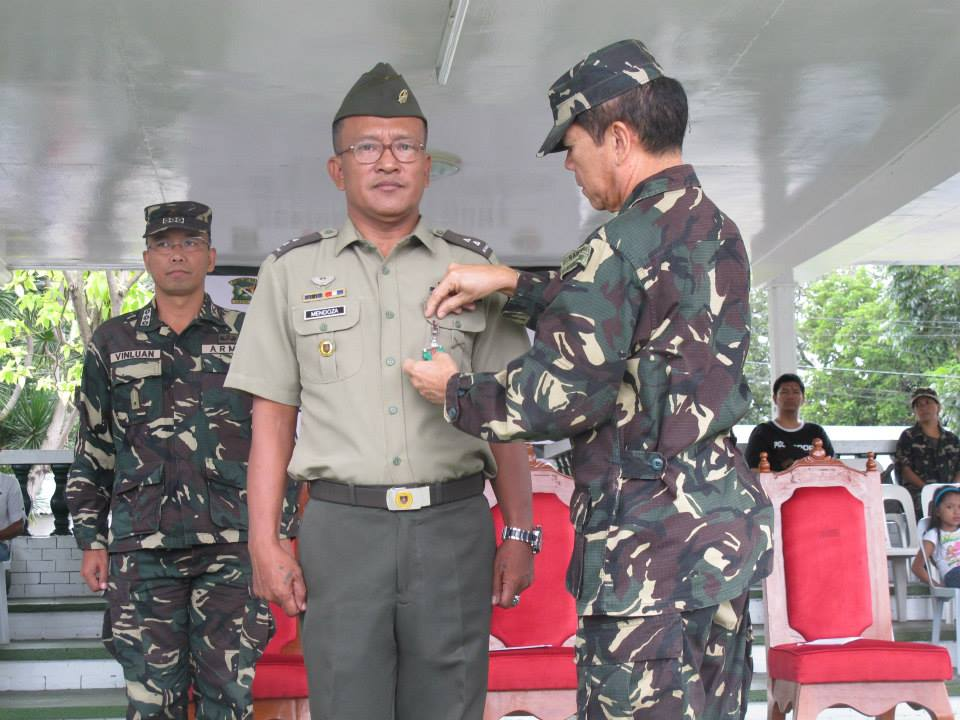
Newly promoted CPT ROMEO C MENDOZA (RES) PA is awarded by BGEN MARCELO B JAVIER JR (RES) AFP; commanding general.15th Infantry Division, ARESCOM with the Military Merit Medal for his contributions to TF Maring.

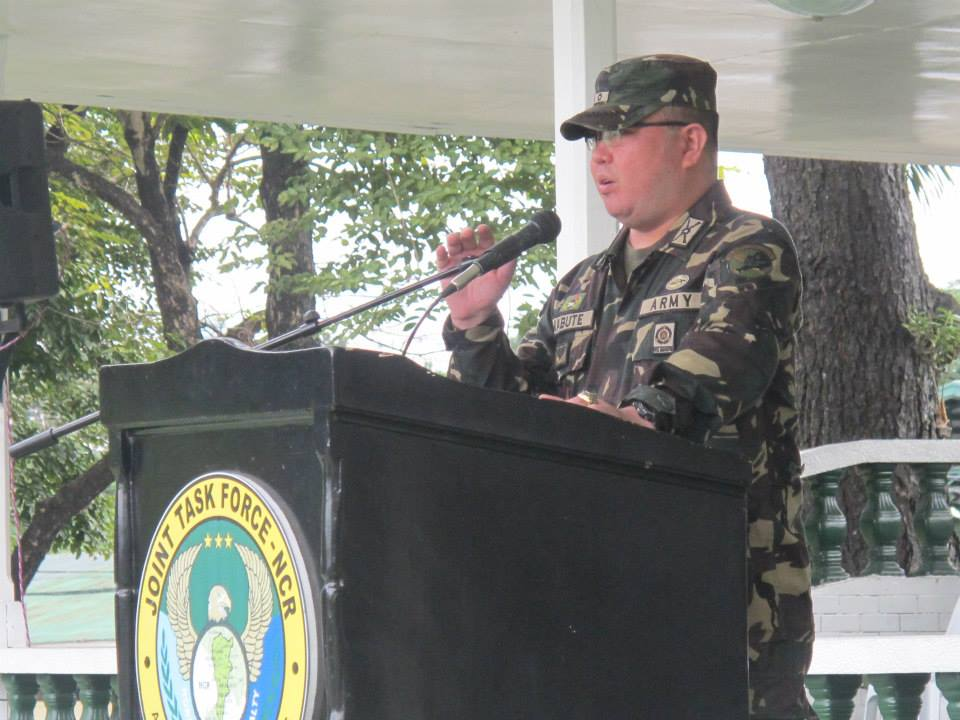
Maj Guillermo "Butch" T Mabute (INF) PA; commanding officer, 1302CDC, NCRRCDG congratulates the awardees and thanks TF Maring for a job well done.

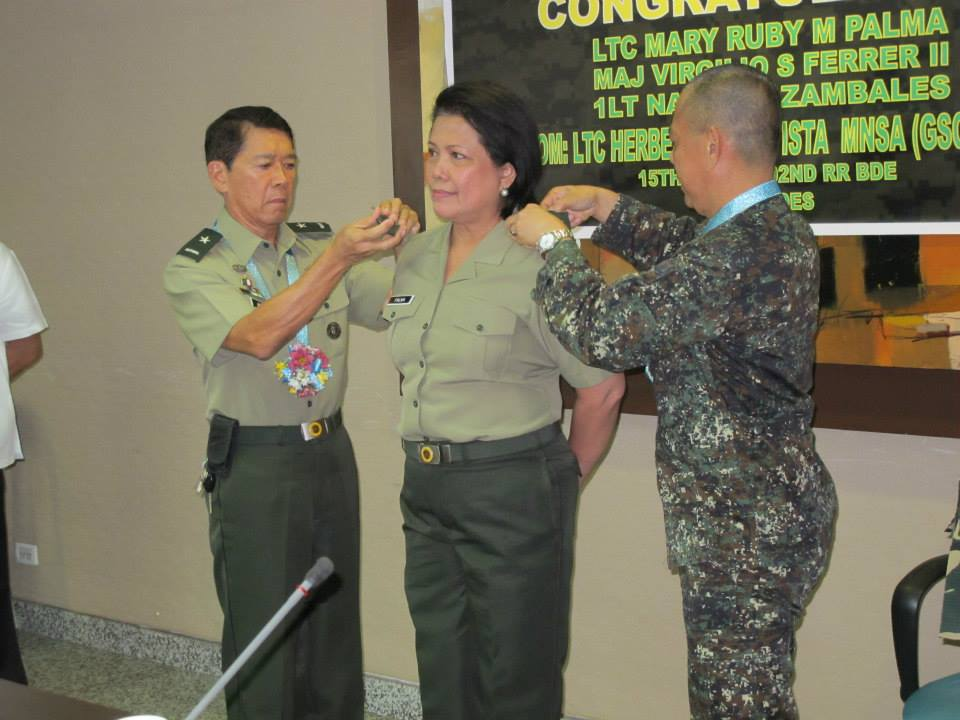
Dr Mary Ruby M Palma of the Quezon City, Gender and Development Resource and Coordinating Office is donned with rank of lieutenant colonel in the reserve force, Philippine Army.

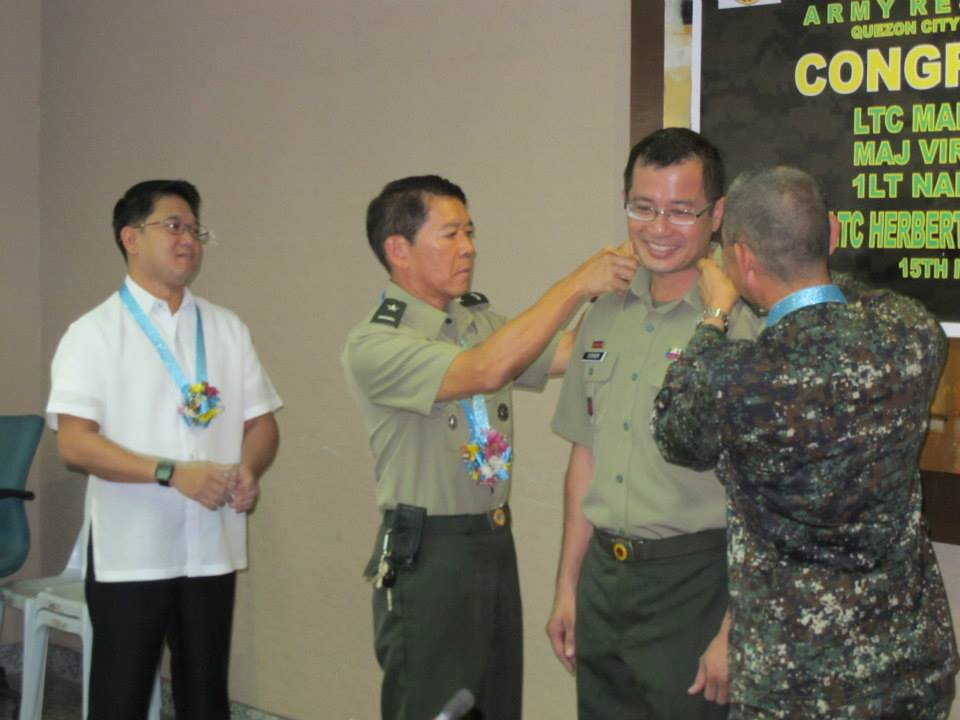
UP Village Bgy Captain and Lawyer Virgilio S Ferrer II is promoted to the rank of major in the reserve force, Philippine Army.

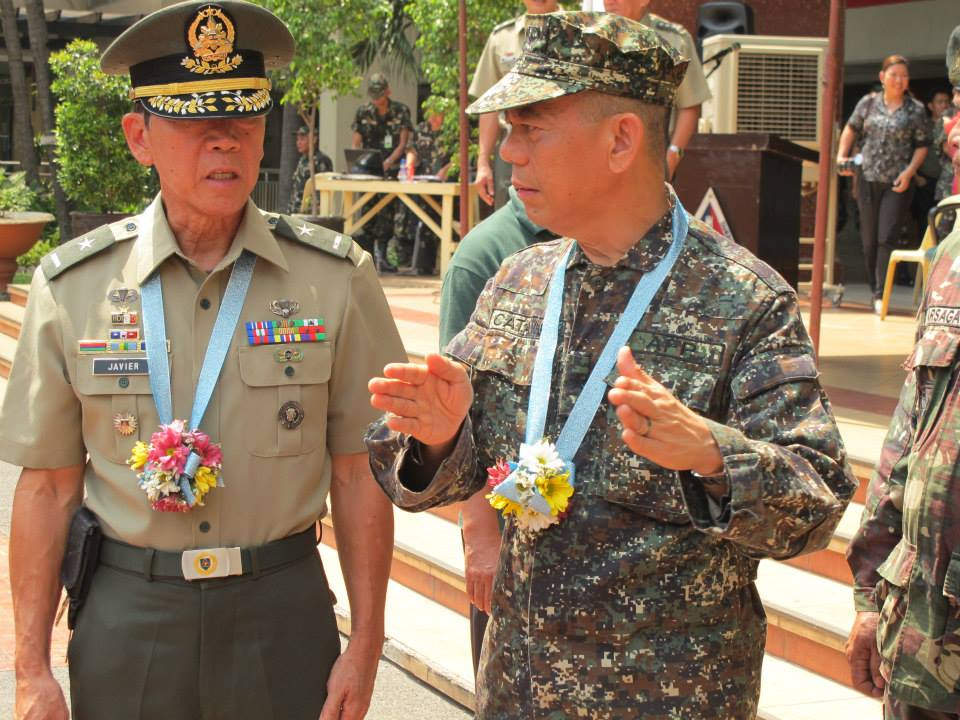
Deputy J9, Commodore George F Cataneo AFP and 15ID(RR) Commander, Brigadier General Marcelo B Javier Jr (RES) AFP inspects the DRRM Units of Quezon City.
