= National Seamen Board =

The National Seamen Board (NSB) is the committee that was created by the Labor Code of the Philippines, through Article 20 of Presidential Decree No. 422. According to Article 20 of the Labor Code (Labor Code Provisions of Overseas Employment, General Provisions, Chapter I, Recruitment and Placement of Workers, Title I), the National Seamen Board of the Philippines has the responsibility of developing and maintaining a comprehensive program for Filipino seamen that are employed overseas. It has the power and duty to perform the following functions:

- To provide free placement services for Filipino seamen;
- To regulate and supervise the activities of agents or representatives of shipping companies in the hiring of Filipino seamen for overseas employment and secure the best possible terms of employment for contract Filipino seamen workers and secure compliance therewith; and
- To maintain a complete registry of all Filipino seamen.

The NSB has original and exclusive jurisdiction over all matters or cases including money claims, involving employer-employee relations, arising out of or by virtue of any law or contracts involving Filipino seamen for overseas employment. The decisions of the NSB are appealable to the National Labor Relations Commission of the Philippines upon the same grounds as provided in Article 223 of the Labor Code. The decisions of the National Labor Relations Commission are final and inappealable.

== See also ==
- Philippine Overseas Employment Administration
