= National Mapping and Resource Information Authority =

Philippine government agency

National Mapping & Resource Information Authority
- Pambansang Pangasiwaan sa Pagmamapa at Impormasyon sa Yaman

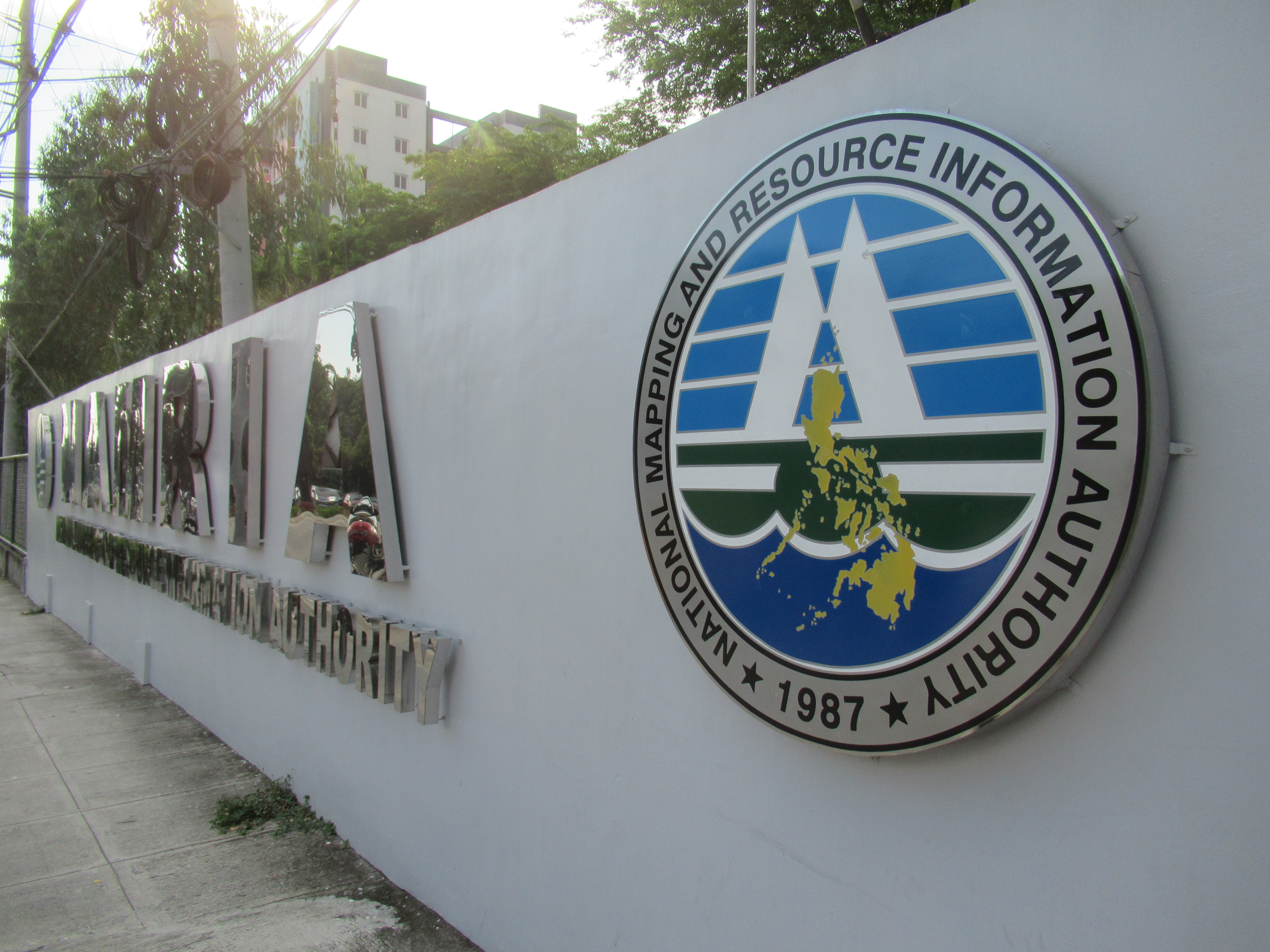
- Gate at BGC

Agency overview
- Formed: 1988
- Headquarters: Lawton Ave., Fort Bonifacio, Taguig, Metro Manila, Philippines; 14.53581°N 121.04135°E
- Employees: 629 (2024)
- Annual budget: ₱1.27 billion (2022)
- Agency executive: Peter N. Tiangco, Administrator
- Parent department: Department of Environment and Natural Resources
- Website: www.namria.gov.ph

The National Mapping and Resource Information Authority (NAMRIA; Filipino: Pambansang Pangasiwaan sa Pagmamapa at Impormasyon sa Yaman) is an agency of the Philippine government under the Department of Environment and Natural Resources (DENR) that is responsible for providing the public with mapmaking services and acting as the central mapping agency, depository, and distribution facility of natural resources data in the form of maps, charts, texts, and statistics.

== History ==
As provided for in the Department of Environment and Natural Resources (DENR) Administrative Order No. 31, series of 1988, which prescribed the guidelines implementing Section 22 (a) of Executive Order 192, our organization is mandated to provide the public with mapmaking services and to act as the central mapping agency, depository, and distribution facility of natural resources data in the form of maps, charts, texts, and statistics.

Four (4) technical branches are undertaking the networks of operation on map production and information generation. These are the Hydrography Branch (HB), the Mapping and Geodesy Branch (MGB), the Resource Data Analysis Branch (RDAB), and the Geospatial Information System Management Branch (GISMB).

== Technical Departments ==
=== Hydrography Branch ===
The functions of the Hydrography Branch (HB) are:

1. To acquire and analyze hydrographic and oceanographic data used to promote navigational safety and oceanographic research. Outputs are nautical charts, navigational warnings, tide and current predictions.

=== Mapping and Geodesy Branch ===
As the sole agency of the government, NAMRIA with its Mapping and Geodesy Department (MGD) produces, maintains and updates base maps that will serve as basic inputs in various development activities of the government, the academic and scientific community, and the private sector.

These maps are produced based on data obtained from aerial photography and satellite imagery.

=== Resource Data Analysis Branch ===
The Resource Data Analysis Branch (RDAB) is mandated to conduct land use assessment/evaluation and land classification. Its functions are:

1. to provide remote sensing services and vital data on the environment, land use, forestry, agriculture, water resources, and coastal zone, among others, and
2. to conduct research on remote sensing and GIS applications.

=== Geospatial Information System Management Branch ===
The Geospatial Information System Management Branch (GISMB) works toward the sharing, transfer, exchange, packaging and dissemination of environment and natural resources data. It develops and maintains information systems and environment and natural resources databases for use not only within NAMRIA but also by outside clients.

It also serves as the marketing arm of the agency for all its products and services.

=== Support Services Branch ===
The Engineering Services Department (ESD) is mandated to work and maintain the internet connection, maintenance of the agency data link server and all of the office computers, facilities and vehicle, instrument.

It also serves as the marketing arm of the agency for all its products and services. shows actual maps covered under alienable and disposable lands.

== See also ==
- Bureau of Lands Management
- Department of Environment and Natural Resources
- Laguna Lake Development Authority
- National Water Resources Board
