= Land Management Bureau =

Government agency

- Kawanihan ng Pamamahala sa Lupain

Agency overview
- Formed: September 2, 1901; 125 years ago
- Headquarters: 880 Estuar Building, 880 Quezon Avenue, Paligsahan, Quezon City, Philippines
- Agency executive: Emelyne V. Talabis, Director
- Parent agency: Department of Environment and Natural Resources
- Website: lmb.gov.ph

The Land Management Bureau (LMB; Filipino: Kawanihan ng Pamamahala sa Lupain) is an agency of the Philippine government under the Department of Environment and Natural Resources responsible for administering, surveying, managing, and disposing Alienable and Disposable (A&D) lands and other government lands not placed under the jurisdiction of other government agencies.

== History ==
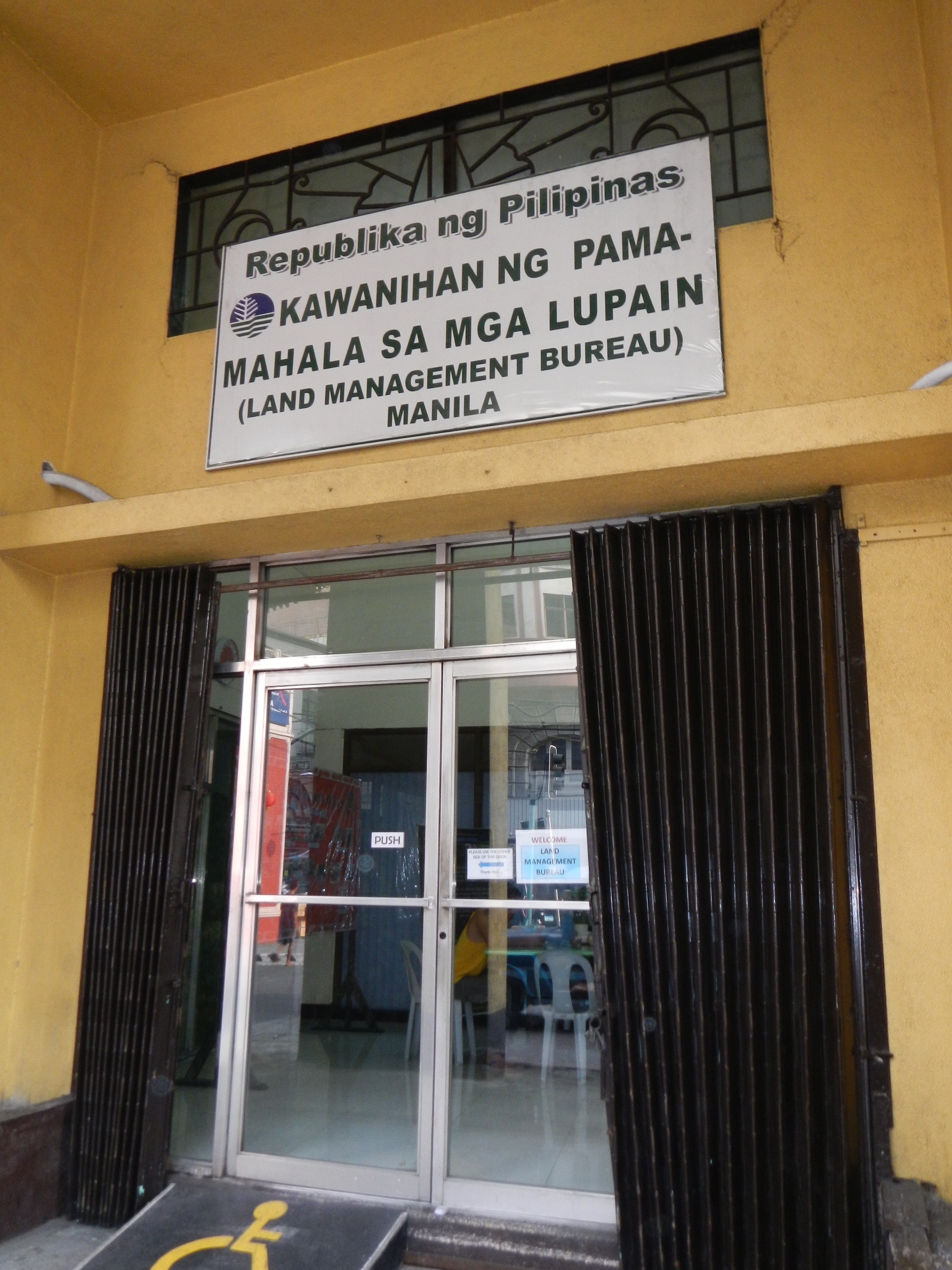
Facade of the former headquarters at Plaza Cervantes, Binondo, Manila

The agency was founded on September 2, 1901 by virtue of Act No. 218 as the Insular Bureau of Public Lands (IBPL). William Tipton was named as its first head. The Bureau was tasked to have a survey of the archipelago through Act No. 926.

== See also ==
- Department of Environment and Natural Resources
- Laguna Lake Development Authority
- National Mapping and Resource Information Authority
- National Water Resources Board
