= Headquarters and Headquarters Service Support Group, 1TAS Brigade =

Headquarters & Headquarters Service Group
- Country: Philippines
- Allegiance: Republic of the Philippines
- Branch: Armed Forces of the Philippines
- Type: Technical Services Reserve; Technical Services
- Role: Combat Support and Combat Service Support, SART and CSAR, Disaster Relief and Rehabilitation Operations, Civil-Military Operations and Civil-military Co-operations, K9 Unit, VIP Unit, CBRNE Unit, In addition the HHSSG also compose a 2 Squad Radio Handler Team
- Size: 2 Platoons VIP Trained Protection (Reserve) Units, 1 K9 Platoon and 1 CBRNE (Chemical Biological Radiological Nuclear High Yield Explosive) Platoon
- Part of: Under the 1st Technical & Administrative Services Brigade (NCR)(R)
- Garrison/HQ: AFPRESCOM Cpd, CGEA, Quezon City
- Nickname(s): "HHSG"
- Motto(s): "Non Sibi Sed Patriae"
- Engagements: None
- Decorations: Philippine Republic Presidential Unit Citation Badge

Commanders
- Current commander: MAJ RUBEN T SALILING VC (RES)
- Sergeant Major: MSg Johnny Y Coronel PA (Res)

Insignia
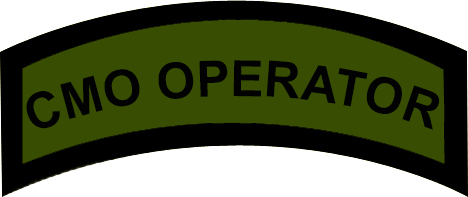
- CMO Operator Tab

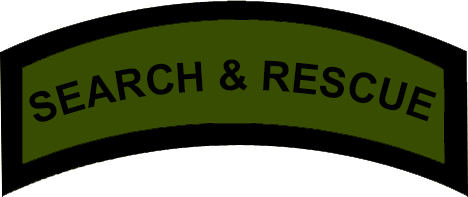
- Search and Rescue Tab

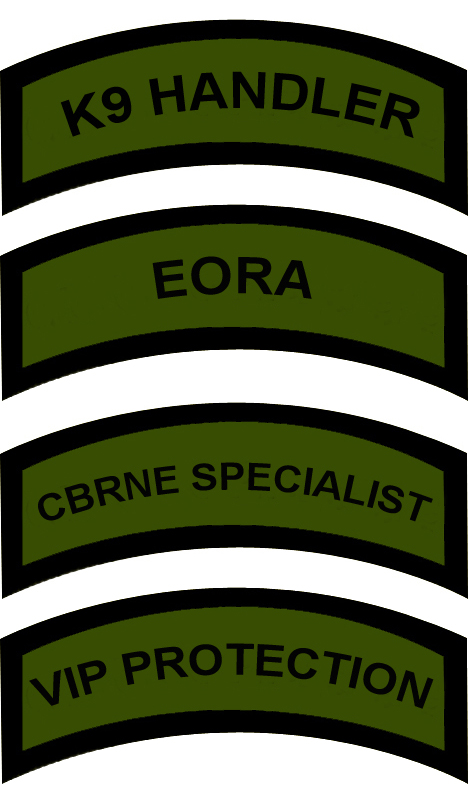
- K9 Handler, EORA, CBRNE Specialist, VIP Protection Tab: All tabs

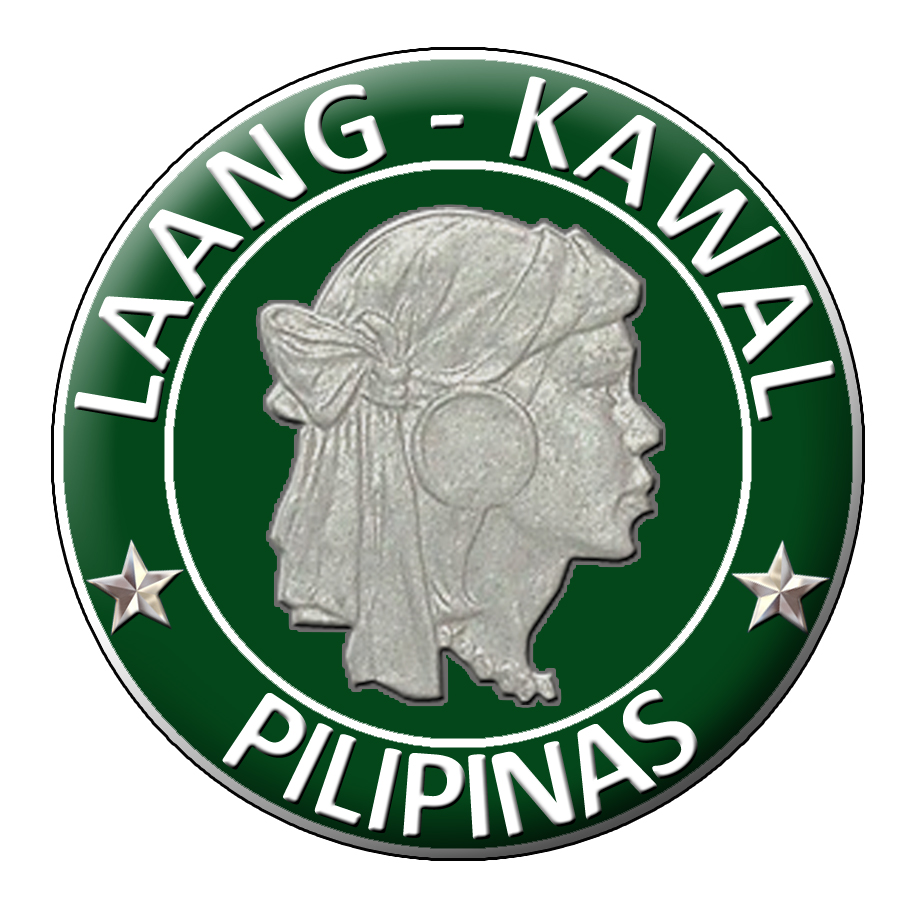
- Laang Kawal Seal

The Headquarters & Headquarters Service Group, known officially as HHSG, is one of the units of the 1st Technical and Administrative Services Brigade (Reserve) of the AFP Reserve Command, and is based in Quezon City. The unit provides combat support and service support services for the 1TAS Brigade.

The Headquarters & Headquarters Service Group is a base unit and is in charge of base administration and service support for the 1st TAS Brigade.
