= Department of Environment and Natural Resources =

Philippine government agency

- Kagawaran ng Kapaligiran at Likas na Yaman
- Seal

Department overview
- Formed: January 1, 1917; 109 years ago (formation); May 17, 1974; 52 years ago (standalone); June 10, 1987; 39 years ago (present name)
- Headquarters: DENR Building, Visayas Avenue, Diliman, Quezon City
- Employees: 15,098 (2024)
- Annual budget: ₱23.6 billion (2021)
- Department executives: Juan Miguel T. Cuna, Acting Secretary; Jose Joaquin Y. Loyzaga, Head Executive Assistant, Office of the Secretary; Marilou G. Erni, Undersecretary for Strategic Communications and Chief of Staff, Office of the Secretary
- Website: www.denr.gov.ph

The Department of Environment and Natural Resources (DENR; Filipino: Kagawaran ng Kapaligiran at Likas na Yaman) is the executive department of the Philippine government responsible for the conservation, management, development, and proper use of the country’s environment in natural resources, specifically forest and grazing lands, mineral resources, including those in reservation and watershed areas, and lands of the public domain, as well as the licensing and regulation of all natural resources as may be provided for by law in order to ensure equitable sharing of the benefits derived therefrom for the welfare of the present and future generations of Filipinos.

== History ==
The Department of Environment and Natural Resources was first established on January 1, 1916, as the Department of Agriculture and Natural Resources (DANR) through the enactment of Act No. 2666 by the Philippine Commission, otherwise known as "An Act to Re-organize the Executive Department of the Government of the Philippine Islands," on November 18, 1916. In 1932, the DANR was reorganized into the Department of Agriculture and Commerce (DAC).

In 1947, a reorganization act changed the DAC back to the Department of Agriculture and Natural Resources. The Natural Resources arm of the DANR was finally spun off on May 17, 1974, as the Ministry of Natural Resources. On January 30, 1987, the ministry was reorganized into the Department of Environment, Energy and Natural Resources, by Executive Order No. 131 and was finally reorganized into the Department of Environment and Natural Resources by Executive Order No. 192 on June 10, 1987. DENR worked on large-scale reforestation of Davao City under the national greening program (NGP), its flagship project that lasted for a period of six years, from 2011 to 2016. NGP is a program aimed at addressing widespread deforestation, land degradation, and rural poverty through massive reforestation and livelihood generation.

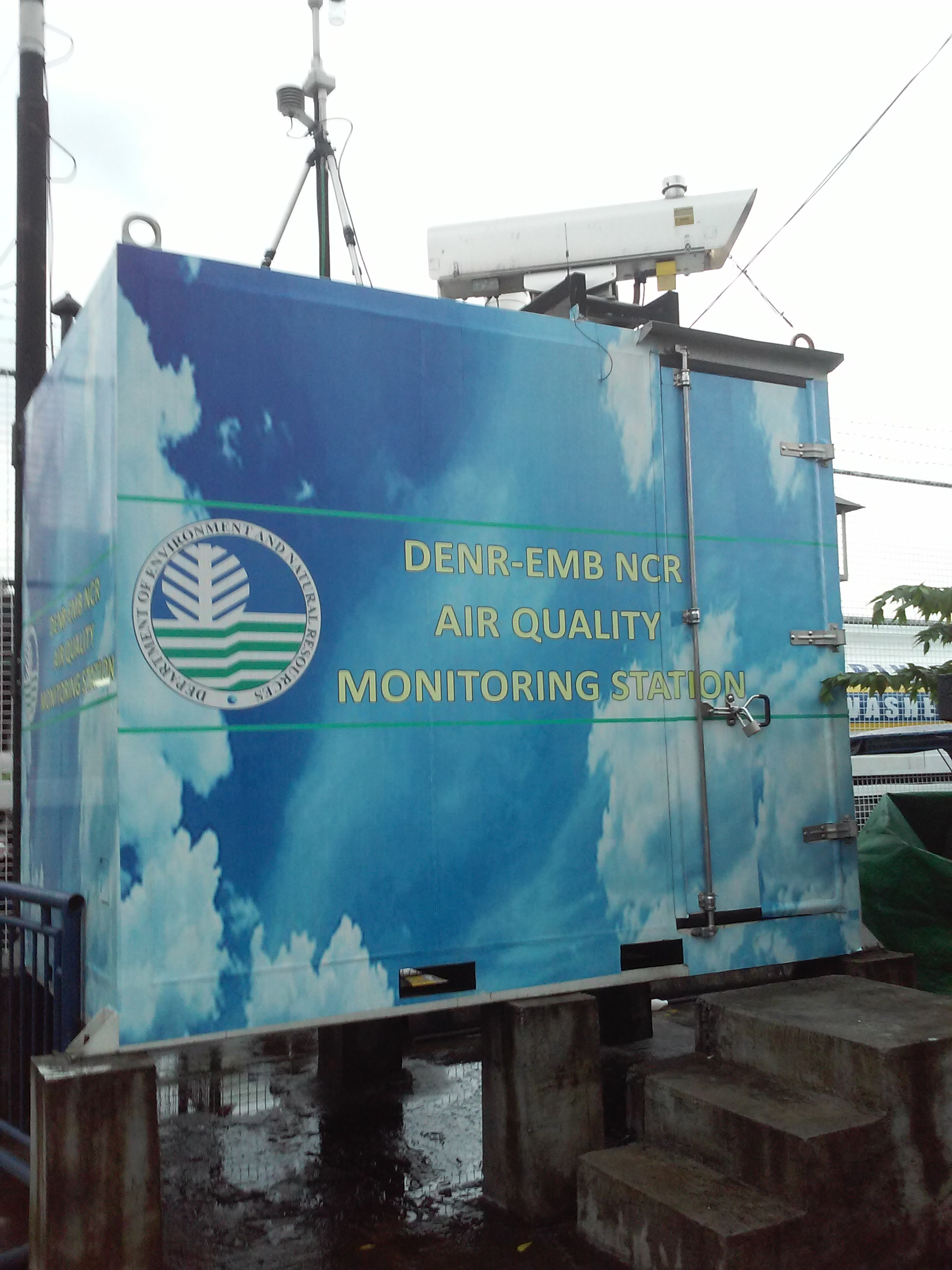
An air quality monitoring station in Marikina maintained and run by the DENR.

== Organizational structure ==
The Department is currently headed by a Secretary with the following Undersecretaries and Assistant Secretaries:

- Undersecretary for Strategic Communications/Chief of Staff, Office of the Secretary
- Undersecretary for Legal Affairs and Administration
- Undersecretary for Finance, Information System and Climate Change
- Undersecretary for Policy, Planning and International Affairs
- Undersecretary for Luzon and Visayas Environment Field Operations
- Undersecretary for Mindanao Environment Field Operations
- Undersecretary for Organizational Transformation and Human Resources
- Undersecretary for Special Concerns and Legislative Affairs
- Undersecretary for Integrated Environment Science
- Assistant Secretary for Environment, Solid Waste Management and Local Government Unit Concerns
- Assistant Secretary for Policy, Planning, and Foreign-Assisted and Special Projects
- Assistant Secretary for Legal Affairs
- Assistant Secretary for Finance, Information System and Mining Concerns
- Assistant Secretary for International Affairs
- Assistant Secretary for Eastern Mindanao Field Operations
- Assistant Secretary for Human Resources, Strategic Communication and Sectoral Initiatives
- Assistant Secretary for Luzon and Visayas Field Operations
- Assistant Secretary for Western Mindanao Field Operations

== Bureaus ==
Seal	Bureau	Acronym	Filipino Name	Incumbent
	Environmental Management Bureau	EMB	Kawanihan ng Pamamahalang Pangkapaligiran	For. Jacqueline A. Caancan, CESO III (Director in Concurrent Capacity as DENR OIC Assistant Secretary for Environment)
	Mines and Geosciences Bureau	MGB	Kawanihan ng Pagmimina at Agham-Panlupa	Engr. Michael V. Cabalda (OIC Director in Concurrent Capacity as DENR Assistant Secretary for Mining Concerns)
	Forest Management Bureau	FMB	Kawanihan ng Pamamahala sa mga Kagubatan	For. Arturo E. Fadriquela (Director)
	Biodiversity Management Bureau (formerly Protected Areas and Wildlife Management Bureau)	BMB (formerly PAWB)	Kawanihan ng Pamamahala sa Sari-Saring Buhay (formerly Kawanihan ng Pamamahala sa mga Parke at Buhay Ilang)	Marcial C. Amaro, Jr., CESO II (Director in Concurrent Capacity as DENR Assistant Secretary for Biodiversity)
	Land Management Bureau	LMB	Kawanihan ng Pamamahala sa mga Lupa	Atty. Emelyne V. Talabis, CESO IV (Director)
	Ecosystems Research and Development Bureau	ERDB	Kawanihan ng Pananaliksik at Pag-unlad Pangkalikasan	Lormelyn E. Claudio, CESO III (Director)

== Attached agencies ==
- Laguna Lake Development Authority
- National Mapping and Resource Information Authority
- National Water Resources Board
- Natural Resources Development Corporation
- Palawan Council for Sustainable Development
- Philippine Mining Development Corporation

== See also ==
- Environmental issues in the Philippines
