= National Capital Regional Command =

Philippine Military's defunct unified branch command for Metropolitan Manila

National Capital Region Command
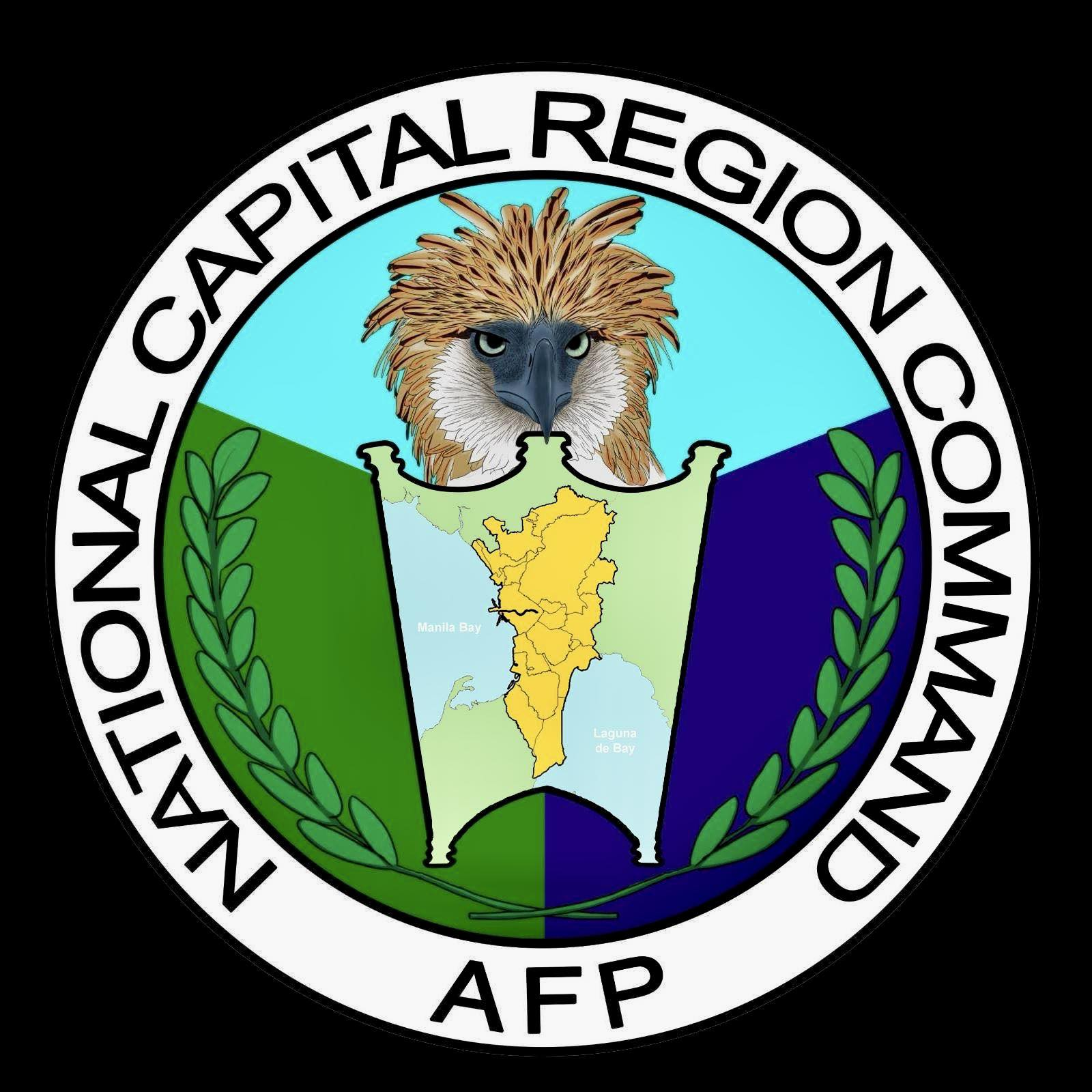
- Active: January 2, 1987 - August 1, 1991 (NCRDC); November 1, 2003 – July 12, 2012 (NCRCOM); February 28, 2025 - Present (NCRCOM)
- Country: Philippines
- Allegiance: Philippines
- Branch: Joint Service Branch
- Type: Unified Command
- Role: Conventional and Unconventional Warfare, Anti-Guerrilla Operations, Anti-coup Operations, and Crowd Control Management
- Size: 2 Brigade Size Units
- Part of: Armed Forces of the Philippines
- Garrison/HQ: Camp Gen Emilio Aguinaldo, Quezon City
- Nicknames: NCRC,NCRCOM,NCRDC
- Mottos: "Karangalan, Paglilingkod at Katapatan"; "Honor, Duty, Loyalty"
- Anniversaries: November 1
- Engagements: Anti-coup d' etat Operations, Anti-dissidence, and Community Development Operations
- Decorations: Philippine Republic Presidential Unit Citation Badge

Commanders
- Current commander: M.Gen. Gregorio B. Hernandez Jr. AFP
- Notable commanders: MGen Alberto Braganza AFP, BGen Ben Mohammad Dolorfino AFP, MGen Fernando Mesa AFP

Insignia
- Unit Patch: NCR Command Emblem

The National Capital Regional Command, known officially as the NCRCom or NCRC, is one of the Armed Forces of the Philippines' geographical commands combating terrorism and insurgency while acting as support units to the Philippine National Police-National Capital Region in maintaining peace and order within Metro Manila. They also support the AFP Southern Luzon Command in anti-dissidence operations in Cavite and Laguna.

== History ==
The command was reactivated on February 28, 2025 after the announcement of the memorandum signed by Gilberto C. Teodoro Jr. for the deactivation of the AFP Joint Task Force – National Capital Region and the reactivation of the NCR Command.

== Line Units ==
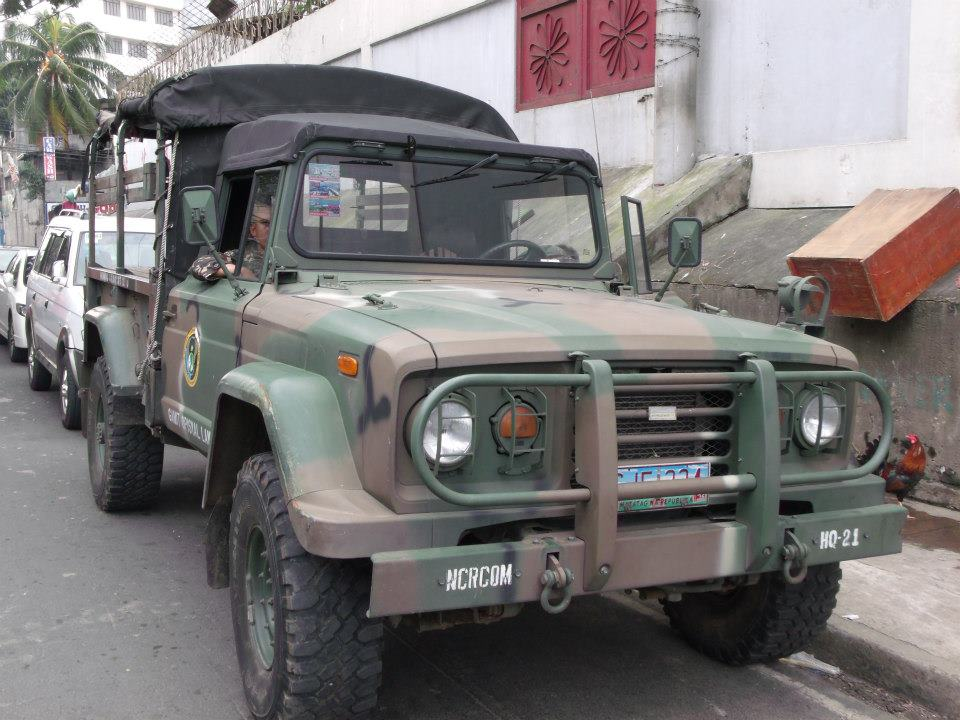
A Kia KM-450 Truck assigned to the NCR Command during one of its MEDCAP Missions in Bgy Sto. Domingo, Quezon City.

=== Base Units ===
- Headquarters & Headquarters Service Support Company
- 7th Civil Relations Group, AFP

=== Philippine Air Force Component ===
- 750th Combat Group, PAF
- 1st Air Force Wing, PAF

=== Philippine Navy Component ===
- 1st Marine Battalion Landing Team, PN
- Naval Forces Reserve – NCR
- 202nd Naval Squadron, PN
- 4th Naval Construction Battalion, PN
- 4th Marine Brigade, PN

=== Philippine Army Component ===
- 1st Mechanized Infantry Battalion, PA
- 1st Armored Cavalry Troop, PA
- 5th Civil-Military Operations Battalion, PA
- 86th Infantry Battalion, PA
- 80th Infantry Battalion, PA
- 15th Infantry Division, PA

== Lineage of Commanders ==
National Capital Region Defense Command (NCRDC)

- LTGEN Salvador M. Mison AFP – 02 Jan 1987 - 21 Sept 1987
- MGEN Ramon E. Montano AFP
- BGEN Raymundo T. Jarque AFP
- LTGEN Thelmo Y. Cunanan AFP
- MGEN Alexander P. Aguirre AFP
- GEN Rodolfo G. Biazon AFP – 23 Jan 1988 - 01 Aug 1991

National Capital Regional Command (NCRCOM)

- LTGEN Alberto F. Braganza AFP – 03 Nov 2003 - 04 Nov 2004
- LTGEN Alan D. Cabalquinto AFP – 04 Nov 2004 - 19 May 2006
- BGEN Salvador G. Peñaflor AFP – 19 May 2006 - 29 Jun 2006
- BGEN Juanito P. Gomez AFP – 29 Jun 2006 - 12 Sept 2006
- MGEN Ben D. Dolorfino AFP – 12 Sept 2006 - 07 Sept 2007
- MGEN Fernando L. Mesa AFP – 07 Sept 2006 - 02 Jun 2008
- MGEN Arsenio R. Arugay AFP – 07 Jun 2008 - 06 Feb 2009
- MGEN Jogy L. Fojas AFP – 06 Feb 2009 - 06 Nov 2009
- MGEN Reynaldu B. Mapagu AFP – 06 Nov 2009 - 13 Mar 2010
- RADM Feliciano A. Angue AFP – 13 Mar 2010 - 12 Aug 2010
- MGEN Arthur I. Tabaquero AFP – 12 Aug 2010 - 24 Nov 2010
- BGEN Romeo F. Fajardo AFP – 24 Nov 2010 - 23 Dec 2010
- MGEN Tristan M. Kison AFP – 23 Dec 2010 - 11 Jul 2012
- BGEN Eric A. Macaambac AFP - February 28, 2025 - October 21, 2025
- MGEN Gregorio B. Hernandez Jr. AFP - October 21, 2025 - Present

== Operations ==
- Anti-guerrilla operations against the New People's Army
- Anti-terrorist operations against known terror groups operating in their AOR.
- Community Development of identified urban poor areas within the National Capital Region
- Intelligence and Counter-Intelligence Operations against government destabilizers.
- Disaster Relief, Rescue and Rehabilitation Operations.

== Awards and decorations ==
=== Campaign streamers ===
| Award Streamer | Streamer Name | Operation | Date Awarded | Reference |
|---|---|---|---|---|
| | Presidential Unit Citation Badge | SAR/DRR Ops, TS Ketsana | 4 February 2010 | General Orders No. 112, GHQ-AFP, dtd 04 Feb '10 |
| | Presidential Unit Citation Badge | General Elections, Philippines | 1 July 2010 | General Orders No. 641, GHQ-AFP, dtd 1 July '10 |

=== Badges ===
| Military Badge | Badge Name | Operation | Date Awarded | Reference |
|---|---|---|---|---|
| | AFP Election Duty Badge | General Elections, Philippines | 21 May 2010 | General Orders No. 513, GHQ-AFP, dtd 21 May '10 |

== See also ==
- AFP Joint Task Force-National Capital Region
