= Philippine Board of Nursing =

Agency of the Philippine government

The Philippine Board of Nursing (PRBoN) is an administrative body under the Professional Regulation Commission that regulates the practice of nursing in the Philippines.

Its three primary purposes are:

1. To provide regulatory standards in the practice of Nursing by implementing the Nurse Practice Act and by lobbying to Congress any proposed amendment to any laws with direct relationship to the practice of nursing.
2. To ensure public safety by administering the Philippine Nursing Licensure Exam (PNLE) to graduates of nursing schools prior to practice of Registered Nursing in the Philippines.
3. To maintain high standards of nursing education by auditing the performance of Philippine Nursing Schools.

Representatives of the Philippine Board of Nursing were slated to sit on the National Nursing Advisory Council, proposed in 2023. Philippine Board of Nursing fought a five-year requirement, instead advocating remaining with a four-year bachelors' program.

== See also ==
- Nursing in the Philippines
