= AFP Joint Task Force – National Capital Region =

Armed Forces of the Philippines Joint Task Force – National Capital Region Hukbong Sandatahang Lakas ng Pilipinas – Pambansang Punong Rehiyon (Filipino)
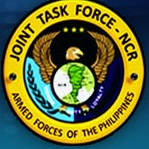
- Active: July 12, 2012 - February 28, 2025
- Country: Philippines
- Allegiance: Philippines
- Branch: Joint Service Branch
- Type: Unified Military Task Force
- Role: Conventional and Unconventional Warfare, Anti-Guerrilla Operations, Anti-coup Operations, and Crowd Control Management
- Size: 2 Brigade size Units
- Part of: Under the Armed Forces of the Philippines
- Garrison/HQ: Camp Gen Emilio Aguinaldo, Quezon City
- Nickname: JTF-NCR
- Mottos: "Karangalan, Paglilingkod at Katapatan" "Honor, Duty, Loyalty"
- Anniversaries: July 12
- Engagements: Anti-coup d' etat Operations, Anti-dissidence, and Community Development Operations

Commanders
- Current commander: BGen. Eric Macaambac, PN(M)
- Notable commanders: Brigadier Gen. Manuel S Gonzales AFP

Insignia
- Unit Patch: JTF-NCR Emblem derived from the NCRCOM Unit Seal

The AFP Joint Task Force - National Capital Region, known officially as the JTF-NCR or Task Force NCR, was one of the Armed Forces of the Philippines' Joint Task Forces assigned to combating Terrorism-Insurgency, and acts as a support unit to the Philippine National Police -National Capital Region Police Office (NCRPO) in maintaining peace and order within Metro Manila.

== History ==
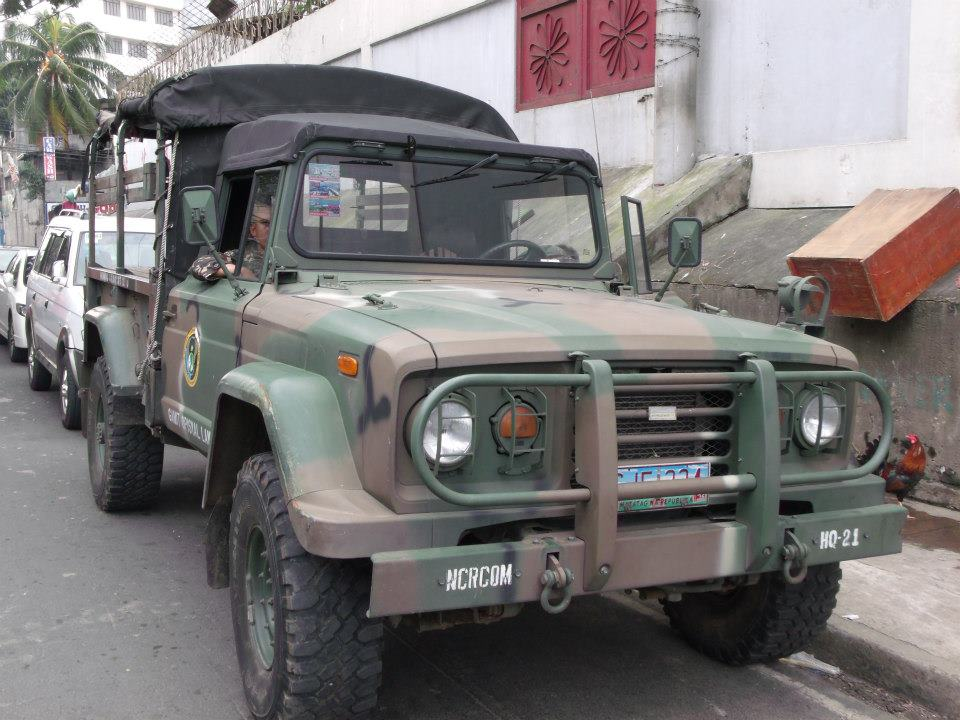
A Kia KM-450 Truck assigned to the defunct NCR Command during one of its MEDCAP Missions in Bgy Sto. Domingo, Quezon City.

JTF-NCR's predecessor, the AFP NCR Command was formally deactivated on 12 July 2012, following the retirement of its last Commanding General, Lieutenant General Tristan M Kison AFP.

On the same day, JTF-NCR was activated to assume the roles handed over by the former command, including providing assistance to the Presidential Security Command in securing the seat of power in Malacañan. On February 28, 2025 the JTF NCR was deactivated under a memorandum signed by Gilberto C. Teodoro Jr. and led to the reactivation and transformation of the AFP National Capital Regional Command.

== Organization ==
The following are the units operating under or attached with the AFP JTF-NCR:

Base Units

- Headquarters & Headquarters Service Support Company
- GHQ K-9 Unit
- GHQ EOD Company

Line Units

- Joint Special Operations Group (NCR Component)
- Joint Task Force NCR - Disaster Rescue & Relief Management Unit
- Presidential Security Command
- 7th Civil Relations Group

AFP Technical Services

- 1st AFPRESCOM Reserve Center (Provisional)

Philippine Army

- Joint Task Group NCR Land (Philippine Army Component)
- National Capital Region Regional Community Defense Group

Philippine Air Force

- Joint Task Group NCR Air (Philippine Air Force Component)
- 1st Air Reserve Center

Philippine Navy

- Joint Task Group NCR Water (Philippine Navy & Marine Corps Component)
- Naval Forces Reserve - NCR

== Lineage of Commanders ==
- Col Manuel S Ramiro (GSC) PAF - 11 Jul 2012 - 22 Mar 2013
- BGen BGen Manuel S Gonzales AFP - 28 Jun 2013 - 15 Dec 2014
- BGen Apolinario Y Alobba AFP - 15 Dec 2014 - 04 Jul 2016
- Col Vicente Gregorio B Tomas (GSC) PA (OIC) - 04 Jul 2016 -
- BGen Roberto D Domines Jr. AFP
- BGen Alex DL Luna, AFP
- BGen Marceliano V Teofilo, PA - 20 Oct 2020 - 24 Oct 2023
- BGen Alexei Musngi, AFP - 25 Oct 2022 - 27 Dec 2023
- BGen Jimmy Larida, PN(M) - 27 Dec 2023 - 10 Jul 2024
- BGen Eric Macaambac PN(M) - 10 Jul 2024 - present

== See also ==
- National Capital Regional Command (Philippines)

== Operations ==
- Anti-guerrilla operations against the New People's Army
- Anti-terrorist operations against known terror groups operating in their AOR.
- Community Development of identified urban poor areas within the National Capital Region
- Intelligence and Counter-Intelligence Operations against government destabilizers.
