= National Labor Relations Commission =

Quasi-judicial agency in the Philippines

- Pambansang Komisyon ng Ugnayan sa Paggawa

Agency overview
- Formed: November 1, 1974
- Dissolved: November 1, 1974
- Jurisdiction: Philippines
- Headquarters: Ben-Lor Building, 1184 Quezon Avenue, Brgy. Paligsahan, Quezon City, NCR 1103, Philippines
- Employees: 1,145 (2024)
- Annual budget: ₱1.32 billion (2021)
- Agency executive: Gerardo C. Nograles, Chairman
- Parent agency: Department of Labor and Employment
- Website: Official website

The National Labor Relations Commission (NLRC; Filipino: Pambansang Komisyon ng Ugnayan sa Paggawa) is a quasi-judicial agency tasked to promote and maintain industrial peace based on social justice by resolving labor and management disputes involving local and overseas workers through compulsory arbitration and alternative modes of dispute resolution. The NLRC part of the Department of Labor and Employment where its policies and programs are coordinated. The commission dates back to the commonwealth period, when the contract labor law act was passed in the United States Congress on January 23, 1885, it was then implemented in the Philippines on June 6, 1899.

== History ==
The Philippines was abiding by the contract labor law act until the national assembly through Commonwealth Act No. 103 created the Court of Industrial Relations (CIR) on October 29, 1936. In the onset of CIR's existence it was first placed under the supervision of the Department of Justice. The court consisted of a presiding judge and four associate judges which were then appointed by the President of the Philippines, which should have consent from the commission on appointments.

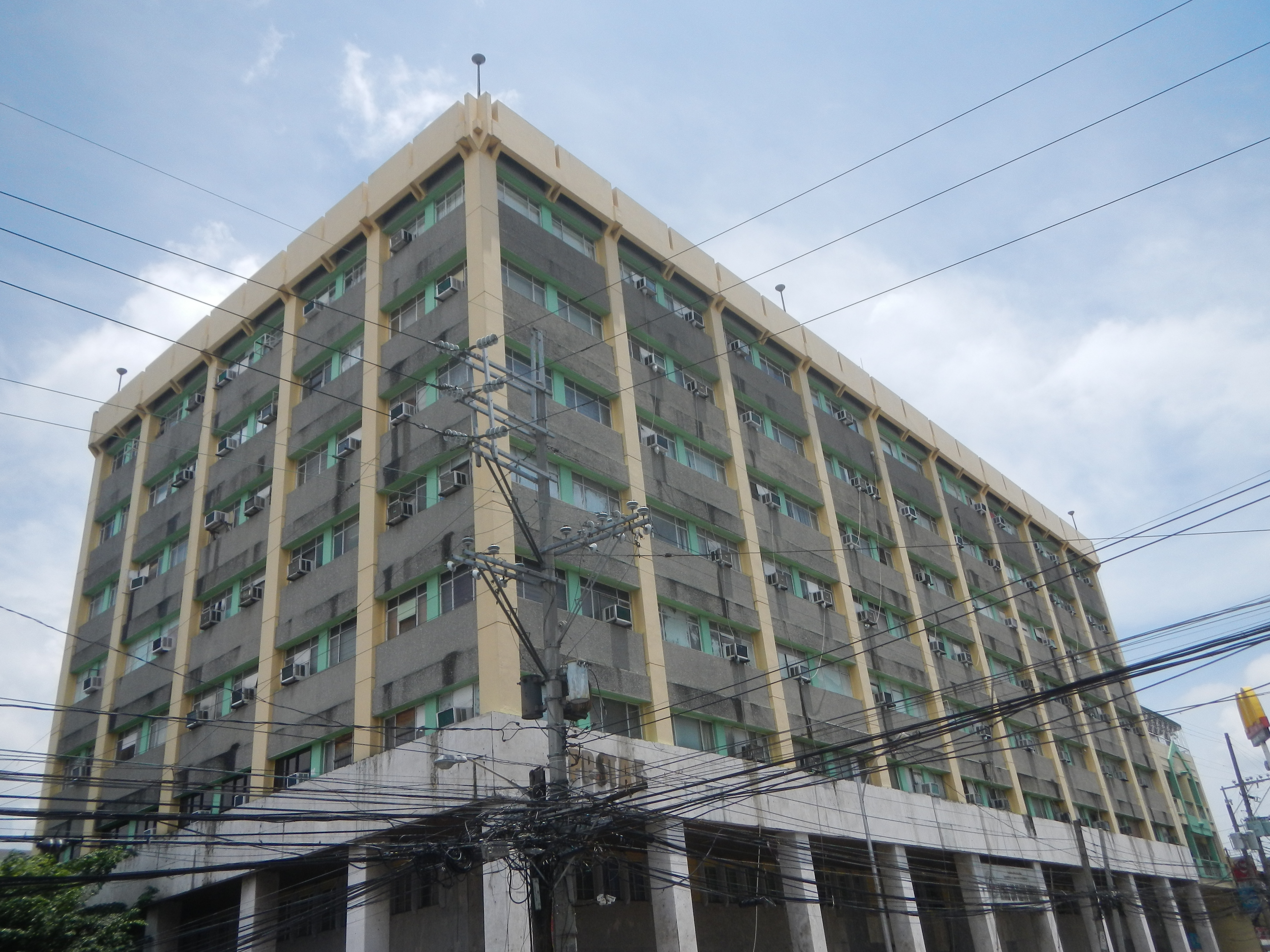
2016 façade, PPSTA Building, Banawe Street

During the martial law, former president Ferdinand E. Marcos issued presidential decree (P.D.) 21 creating an interim National Labor Relations Commission. It comprised three members the undersecretary of labor as Chairman, the Director of labor relations and the Director of labor standards. The Interim Commission took point in all matters involving employer-employee relations including all disputes and grievances. The interim NLRC existed for two years, until the passage of P.D. 442. The CIR was abolished on November 1, 1974, because of its conflicts with the provisions of the newly formed interim NLRC. The NLRC under P.D. 442 was given the same scope of services to the interim NLRC but had its members increased as the volume of labor cases also increased.

After the EDSA revolution the NLRC was regionalized after the 1986 constitutional convention. The first and second division's main offices are in Manila. These divisions handle cases from the National Capital Region (NCR). The third division, whose offices are also in Manila, handles cases from Luzon except the NCR. The fourth division, which is in Cebu City, handles cases from the Visayas, while the fifth division, in Cagayan de Oro, handles cases from Mindanao.

== Rules of procedure ==
The Labor Code of the Philippines which is part of article 218 of the revised penal code has issued the NLRC the following set rules for handling its cases:

- Rule 1 – Title and Construction, only signifies the title of the governing rules.
- Rule 2 - Definition of Terms, defines the legal terms used in the terms and phrases defined in Article 212 of the Labor Code shall be given the same meanings when used in NLRC cases.
- Rule 3 - Pleadings, notices and appearances, signifies that the parties involved will be given due notice for any impending proceedings.
- Rule 4 - Venue, assignment and disposition of cases, advises that cases which Labor Arbiters will file the case in the regional arbitration branch that has jurisdiction over the workplace unless there are justifiable reasons why it should be filled elsewhere. An example of this would be a sensitivity of a case where one party is in danger.
- Rule 5 - Proceedings before Labor Arbiters, signifies that the Labor Arbiters shall have exclusive jurisdiction to hear and decide all cases involving labor issues.
- Rule 6 – Appeals, it signifies where to submit an appeal after a case has been decided and this area also advises both parties of the timeframe given for an appeal to be submitted.
- Rule 7 - Proceedings before the Commission, this rule suggests that the process flow of each case proceeding from the time a case is filled towards the decision or further into the motion for reconsideration.
- Rule 8 - Execution proceedings, signifies the rules to take place after decisions have been done and how the winning party could claim the damages incurred.
- Rule 9 - Certified cases, signifies that the NLRC's cases are certified by law and any cases which happened within the proceedings are considered final unless appeals are made.
- Rule 10 – Contempt, signifies that committing any act of misbehaviour in the presence of the Chairman or any Commissioner or Labor Arbiter will herby be given an additional penalty.
- Rule 11 – Injunction, illustrates the injunctions that may happen within a labor case.
- Rule 12 - Commission seal and records, and powers and duties of Commission officials, illustrates the notices to be given, how archives may be accessed and duties of the officials and employees of NLRC.
- Rule 13 – Effectivity, indicates that these rules are in effect 15 days after August 31, 1990, which means that these rules were officially used starting September 15, 1990.

== Case backlogs ==
On June 30, 2005, the NLRC confirmed of a backlog of 4,922 cases in NCR and a backlog of 8,808 cases in the regional arbitration branches. NLRC Chairman Benedicto Ernesto R. Bitonio Jr. announced a three-year master plan which was approved by the NLRC en banc committee. They aim to clear all the backlogs by 2008, this would entail each of the 15 NLRC commissioners to resolve 57.2 cases per month while each of the 105 labor arbiters must dispose of 25.3 cases per month. In 2006, the NLRC's third division had confirmed resolving 2,697 labor disputes, which gave the division the highest disposition rating of 60 percent among the three divisions in Luzon. As of March 2011, the NLRC has yet to show effort that they indeed have plans to clear all backlogs. Pending cases appealed on 2007 still has yet to be touched. On February 28, 2011, Arbiter Jose G. de Vera who declined to issue a Writ of Partial Execution as motioned by the complainants on the grounds of accrued salaries on Reinstatement aspect of the appealed case, issued an order inhibiting himself from the case. He has been pressured by the respondents to delay and hold issuance of such writ for their personal gains. The case was re-raffled to Arbiter Macam and immediately, an Alias Writ of Execution was issued.
