= National Water Resources Board =

Philippine government agency

- Pambansang Kalupunan sa Yamang Tubig

Agency overview
- Formed: 1974
- Employees: 114 (2024)
- Annual budget: ₱122.25 million (2021)
- Agency executive: Sevillo D. David Jr., Executive Director
- Parent department: Department of Environment and Natural Resources
- Website: www.nwrb.gov.ph

The National Water Resources Board (NWRB; Filipino: Pambansang Kalupunan sa Yamang Tubig) is a Philippine government agency working on water resources and potable water. It has policy-making, regulatory and quasi-judicial functions.

The NWRB is an attached agency of the Department of Environment and Natural Resources responsible for ensuring the exploitation, utilization, development, conservation and protection of the country's water resource, consistent with the principles of "Integrated Water Resource Management".

The NWRB Board is composed of five cabinet secretaries, plus a representative from academia and the NWRB's executive director and is led by the Secretary of Environment and Natural Resources.

== History ==
The predecessor of the NWRB is the National Water Resources Council (“NWRC”), which was created in 1974 under Presidential Decree No. 424, otherwise known as the “Integrated Reorganization Plan”. It was subsequently renamed as NWRB pursuant to Executive Order No. 124-A. Under the said decree, the NWRB is tasked among others, to Coordinate and integrate water resource development activities of the country; formulate general criteria, methods and standards for data collection, project investigation, formulation, planning design and feasibility evaluation, and rules and regulations for the exploitation and optimum utilization of water resources; Review and approve water resource development plans and programs of other agencies; undertake river basin surveys, inventories and appraisals, and develop comprehensive basin-wide plans of storage and control to maximize the conservation and multipurpose use of water; and undertake hydrologic surveys and establish, operate and maintain observation station networks and centralized water resources data center; and conduct and/or promote special studies and researches with other government or agencies on related aspects of water resources development.

The NWRB is advises the National Economic and Development Authority (“NEDA”) on matters pertaining to water resources development projects and programs.

In 1976, Presidential Decree No. 1067, otherwise known as the Water Code of the Philippines was enacted. Based on the principles that: (a) “all water belongs to the State”; and (b) the State may allow the use or development of its waters by administrative concession", the NWRB was instituted as a “water resource regulator” tasked to regulate and control the utilization, exploitation, development, conservation and protection of all water resources.

The specific functions of the NWRB, as a "water resource regulator", include among others, (a) the issuance of water permits for the appropriation, and use of waters; and (b) adjudication of disputes relating to the appropriation, utilization, exploitation, development, control and conservation, protection of waters.

In 1977, the Board of Power and Waterworks (BPW) was abolished pursuant to Presidential Decree No. 1206. The function of the BPW that were inherited from the Public Service Commission as regards waterworks systems were later transferred to the NWRB, instituting the NWRB as an “economic regulator” of waterworks systems.

In 2002, the approval of tariffs for water districts was transferred to the NWRB from the Local Water Utilities Administration (LWUA), pursuant to Executive Order No. 123. In the same executive order, the membership of the NWRB Board was changed to its present composition.

== See also ==
- Water supply and sanitation in the Philippines
- Water privatization in the Philippines
