= Presidential Security Command =

Security group

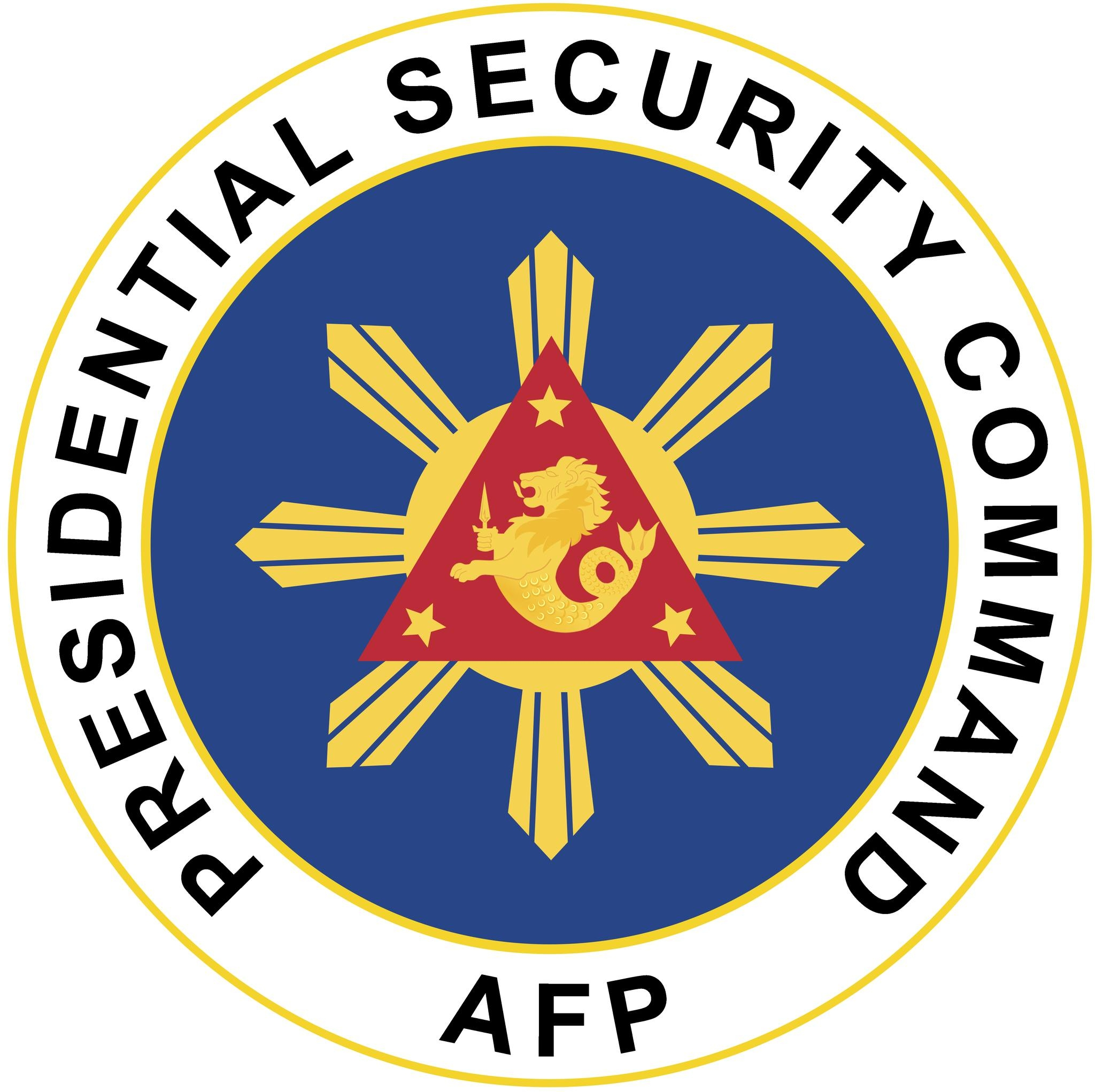
- PSC seal
- Active: June 23, 1898–present
- Country: Philippines
- Branch: Army, Navy, Air Force, Marines, Coast Guard, and Police
- Role: Close protection and escort towards the President, Vice President and VVIP; Honor guard duties
- Size: 1 Brigade/Regiment, 3 Battalions. Total is 4000+ soldiers, police, coast guard and civilian personnel
- Part of: Armed Forces of the Philippines
- Garrison/HQ: Malacañang Park, Malacañang Palace, Manila
- Nicknames: PSC, The President's Guards, Presidential Guards, Filipino Secret Service, Men in Barong, PSG Troopers
- Mottos: Integrity, Service, Excellence
- Mascot: Eagle
- Anniversaries: June 23
- Decorations: Presidential Streamer Award, Philippine Republic Presidential Unit Citation Badge
- Website: Official website

Commanders
- Current commander: Commodore Andro Val Abayon, PN
- Notable commanders: MAJ Geronimo Gatmaitan, PA; LTGEN Jose Calimlim, AFP; BGEN Delfin Bangit, AFP; BGEN Rodolfo Diaz, AFP; COL Hermogenes Esperon Jr., PA; BGEN Glen Rabonza, AFP; COL Voltaire T. Gazmin, PA; BGEN Ramon Mateo Dizon, PA; BGEN Lope C. Dagoy, PA

Insignia
- Unit Patch: PSG Badge

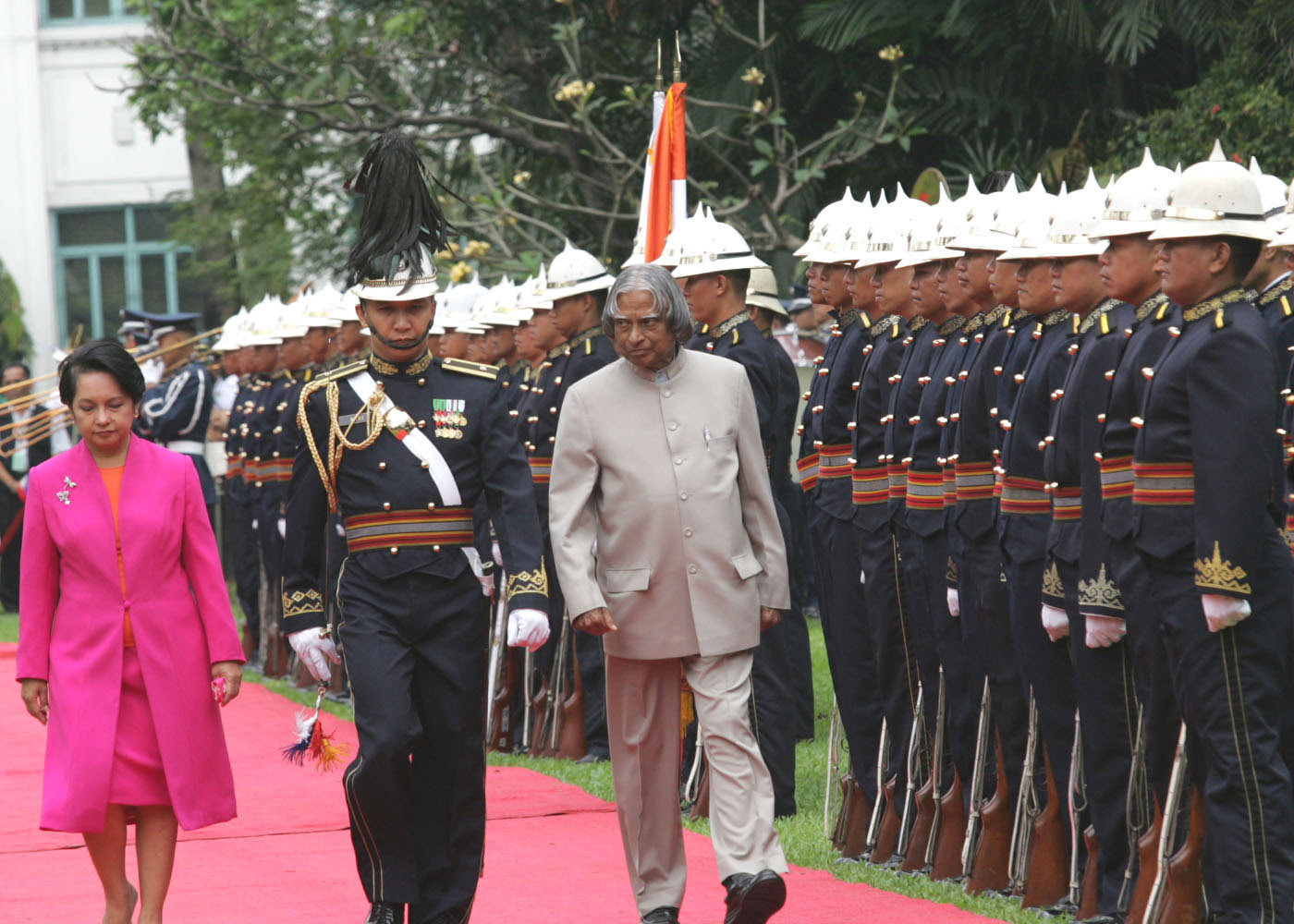
Philippine president Gloria Macapagal Arroyo with Indian president A. P. J. Abdul Kalam inspecting the Malacañang Honor Guards during 2006

The Presidential Security Command (PSC), known from 1986 to 2024 as the Presidential Security Group (PSG), is a Philippine close protection agency. (Note: PSC is a joint AFP-PNP-PCG-BFP service unit.) It is the primary agency concerned with providing close-in security and escort to the President of the Philippines, their immediate families, former presidents of the Philippines as well as visiting heads of state.

The PSC is stationed at Malacañang Palace, the official residence of the president. Members of the PSC also accompany the president on both domestic and overseas trips.

== History ==
On June 23, 1898, a guards unit called as the Cuerpo de la Guardia Presidencial (Presidential Guard Corps) was raised at the time to protect the first official president, Emilio Aguinaldo. Composed of a presidential cavalry squadron and artillery batteries, reinforced with multiple guards infantry battalions all under the command of Major Geronimo Gatmaitan, which provided the protection of President Aguinaldo and his family. Like today's PSC, they wore rayadillo uniforms, but with straw hats.

In 1936 the 1st Cavalry Regiment of the 1st Regular Division, Philippine Army, raised the same year, was tasked with defending President Manuel Quezon, his family, and the palace complex. On May 22, 1938, they were replaced by the Malacañang Guard, which was a company composed of 110 former constabulary men. On 13 July 1938 the Malacañan Guard was transferred to the Philippine Constabulary, and in August 1939 the company was renamed Presidential Guard.

During the Second World War, the Presidential Guard was combined with the Philippine Constabulary and Manila ROTC units to form the new Second Regular Division which fought in Bataan. On 14 October 1943 two trucks of Presidential Guardsmen escorted Pres. Jose P. Laurel to the ceremony for the inauguration of the Second Philippine Republic. Initially during the Laurel administration, units of the occupying Imperial Japanese Army took over guard duties at the palace, only to be replaced by an all-Filipino guard battalion at the insistence of Laurel. During the Battle of Manila in 1945, Presidential Guardsmen remained at their posts in Malacañang. At war's end, it was in turn replaced by the AFP Presidential Guards Battalion under the orders of President Sergio Osmeña and would remain until the time of his successor, Manuel Roxas.

The PSC of today traces its origins to 1950 when President Elpidio Quirino transferred the Presidential Guards Battalion under the control of the Philippine Constabulary (PC) in 1950. At the same time, a separate presidential security unit was founded as the secret service and protective unit of the state presidency, the First Family, and Malacañang Palace, under the control of the Constabulary (first the Secret Service of Malacañang Palace then later renamed into the Presidential Security Force, the Presidential Security Unit, and then the Presidential Security Agency). On October 22, 1971, under the Presidency of Ferdinand Marcos, General Order No. 212 GHQ, AFP was issued, creating the Presidential Security Command (PSC) as a unified command of the AFP.

Emblem of the former Presidential Security Group (PSG) used between 2017 and 2024

When President Corazon Aquino was sworn in as president, she gave the order to disband the PSC and replace with "a leaner" Presidential Security Group (PSG), with then-Army Colonel (and future Secretary of National Defense) Voltaire Gazmin as its chief. This was formalized by General Order No. 60, GHQ-New Armed Forces of the Philippines (NAFP), which deactivated the PSC and activated the PSG as one of the support units of the NAFP. The PSG, then as in the present, has always included both civilian agents and seconded servicemen from the Armed Forces.

The PSG launched the PSG Troopers website on February 10, 2017, as part of an effort to improve public relations. Information concerning the president's security arrangements are considered as classified.

Four PSG officers were wounded in an encounter with New People's Army guerillas in Arakan, Cotabato after they were spotted running a fake vehicle checkpoint.

On September 26, 2017, a PSG officer was found dead inside the Malacañang complex with a gunshot wound to the chest.

In January 2024, the Department of National Defense officially disclosed that the Presidential Security Group (PSG) was expanded from a group to a command, now officially known again as the Presidential Security Command (PSC), restoring the setup of the organization during the time of President Ferdinand Marcos, late father and namesake of the current President, Bongbong Marcos. The term PSC was earlier utilized on January 19 when the agency's Commander, MGen. Nelson Morales, issued a statement reacting to criticisms on Marcos’ use of the presidential helicopter to travel to the Philippine Arena in Bulacan to watch the Coldplay concert.

In July 2024, the Vice Presidential Security and Protection Group (VPSPG), a separate unit activated in 2022 that was responsible for the security of Vice President Sara Duterte, was revealed to have been integrated into the reorganized Command after the elevation of the 75 personnel of the Police Security and Protection Group (PSPG) assigned to the VPSPG were transferred to the National Capital Region Police Office.

== Role ==
The role of the PSC is tasked with:

- Providing security to:
  - The president and their immediate family.
  - The president-elect and their immediate family.
  - Visiting heads of states or diplomats and Cabinet members and their families travelling with them and other guests.
  - Visitors of the Presidential Museum and Library.
- Providing escort security for them at all times.
- Securing the president residences, offices, and places of engagements.
- Surveillance and monitoring activities.
- Performing state protocol duties including honor guard duties.
- Public Order, Public Safety, & Crowd Control.

The Presidential Security Command also have other functions, such as providing support to other government agencies. They assist the AFP and PNP in its anti-organized-crime and corruption undertakings as well as maintaining public order and safety, usually authorized by the Office of the President. They also conduct community service efforts in local communities, and maintain and secure all facilities and transportation assets used by the offices of the president and vice president in doing its regular and non-regular functions. The role of securing the Vice President and it’s immediate family is under the Vice Presidential Security and Protection Group (VPSPG).

== Organization ==
The following are organized under the PSC (formerly the PSG) as of 2023:

=== Key personnel ===
1. Commander
2. Chief of Staff
3. Special Reaction Unit Commander
4. Commanding Officers
  - Headquarters and Headquarters Service Battalion
  - Security Battalion
  - Presidential Escorts Battalion
  - Presidential Guards Battalion

=== Units ===
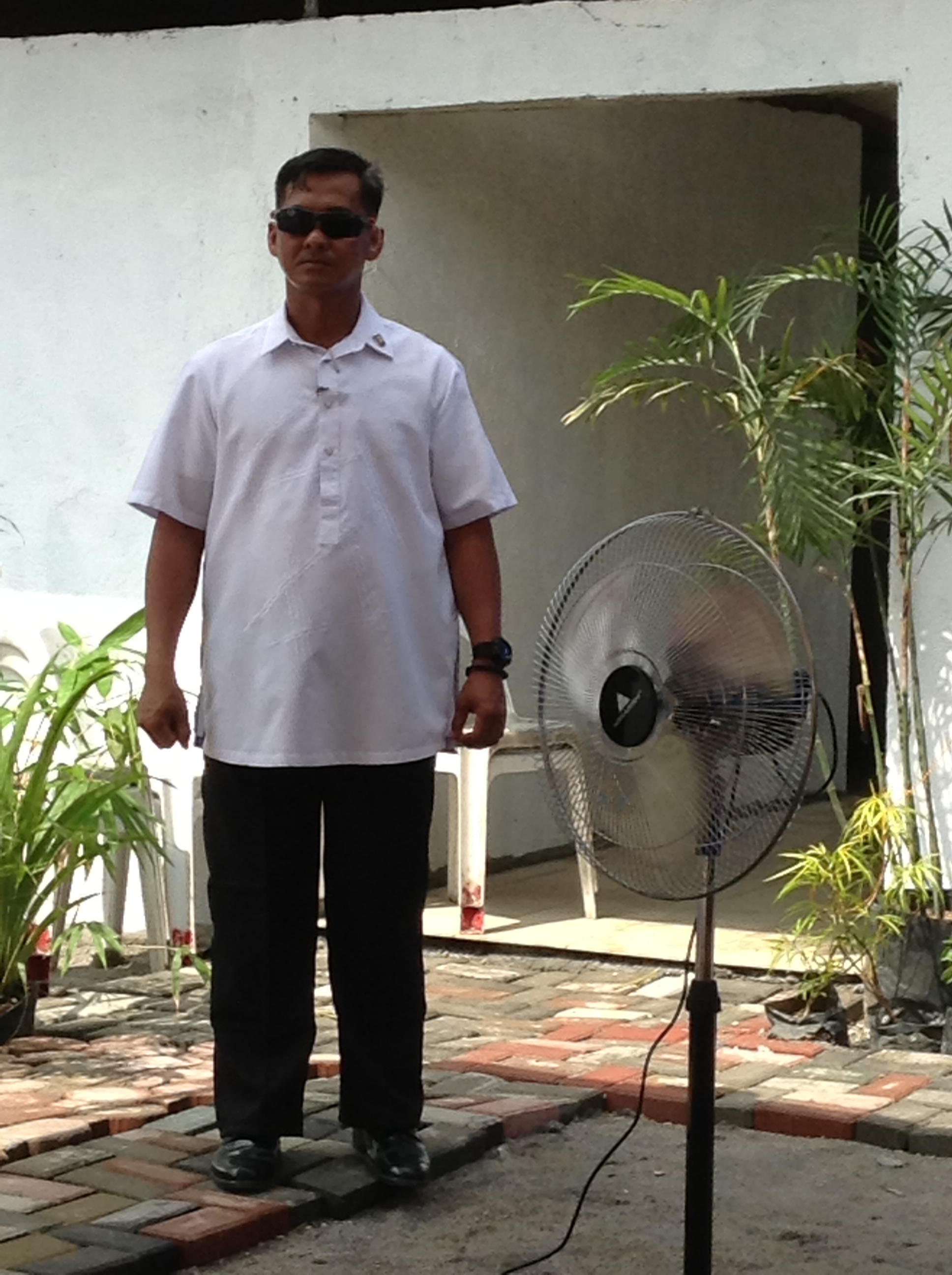
A PSC agent

- Headquarters & Headquarters Service Battalion
- Presidential Escorts - the actual personnel accompanying the President and his/her immediate family
- Guard Battalion
- Security Battalion
- Special Reaction Unit
  - K9 Unit
- PSG Station Hospital
- PSG Dental Dispensary
- Presidential Intelligence Company
- PSG Training School
- PSG Band
- Philippine National Police-Police Security and Protection Group (PNP-PSPG) Presidential Protection Division

== Recruitment ==
Agents are usually personnel from the Armed Forces of the Philippines, Philippine National Police and Philippine Coast Guard. However, there are a few civilian personnel acting as support units.

Military and police personnel serving in the PSC retain the ranks and insignia of their parent service which are worn in almost all orders of dress.

== Equipment ==
PSC members are known to carry assorted firearms, some known firearms include:

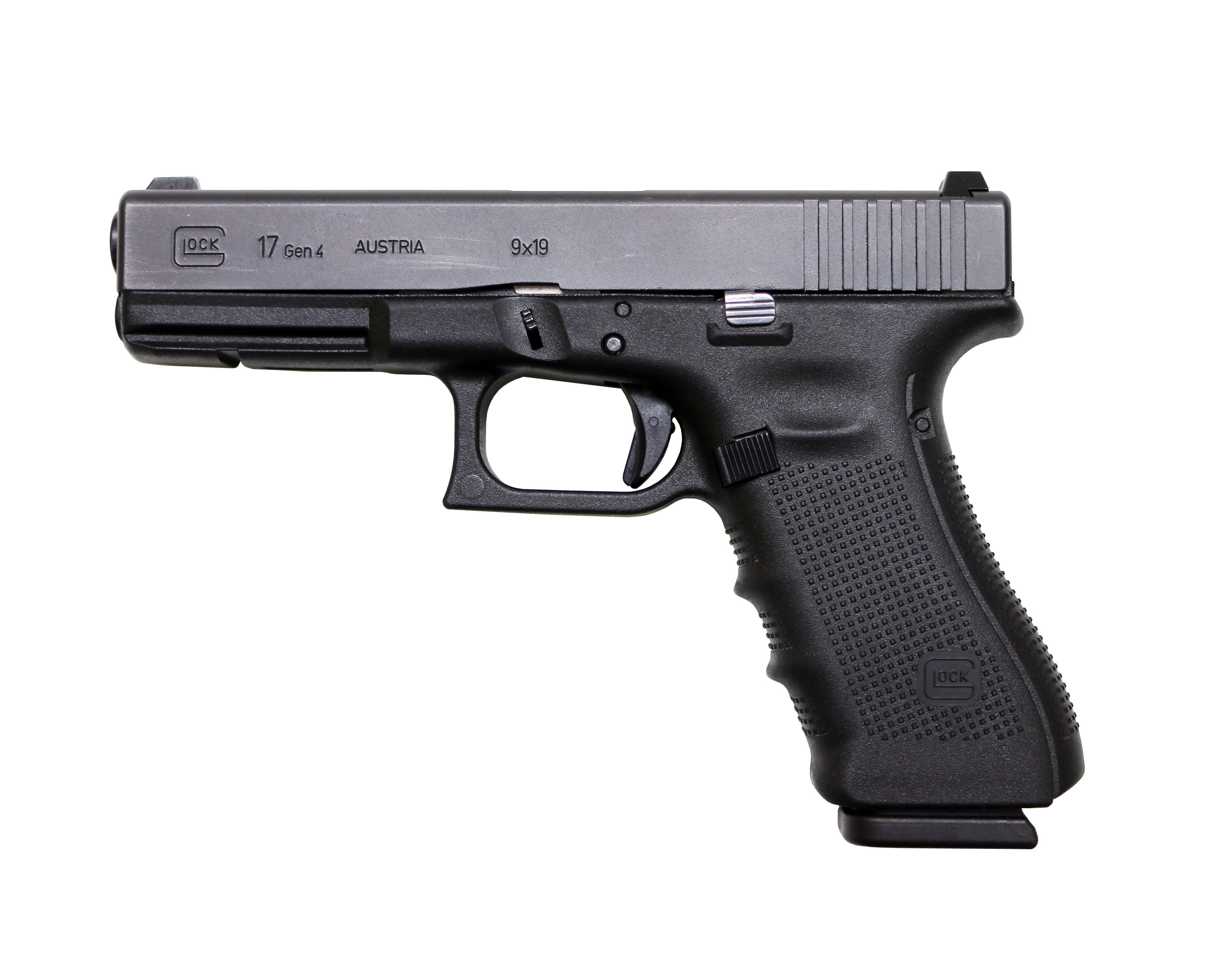
Glock pistols

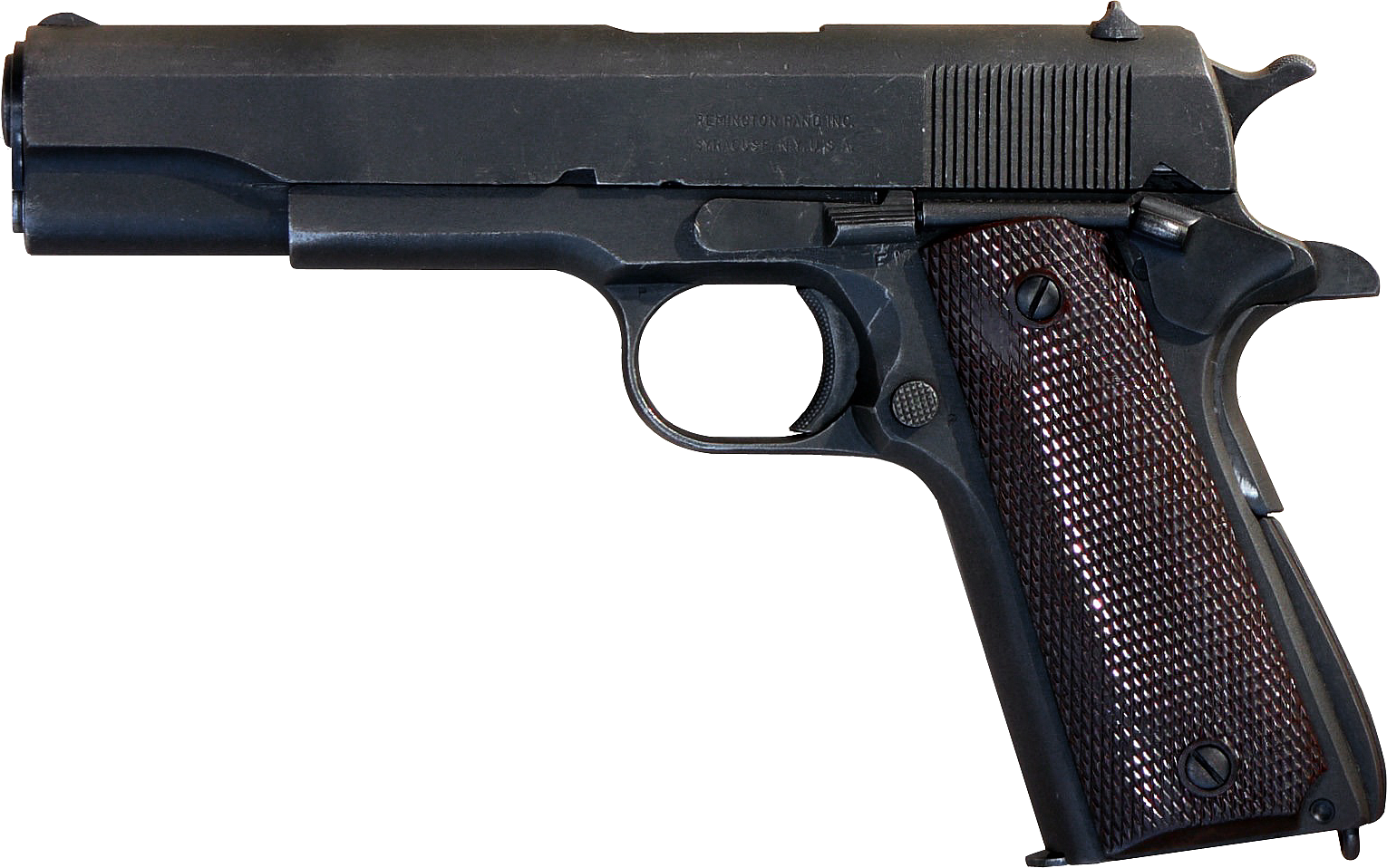
M1911 pistol

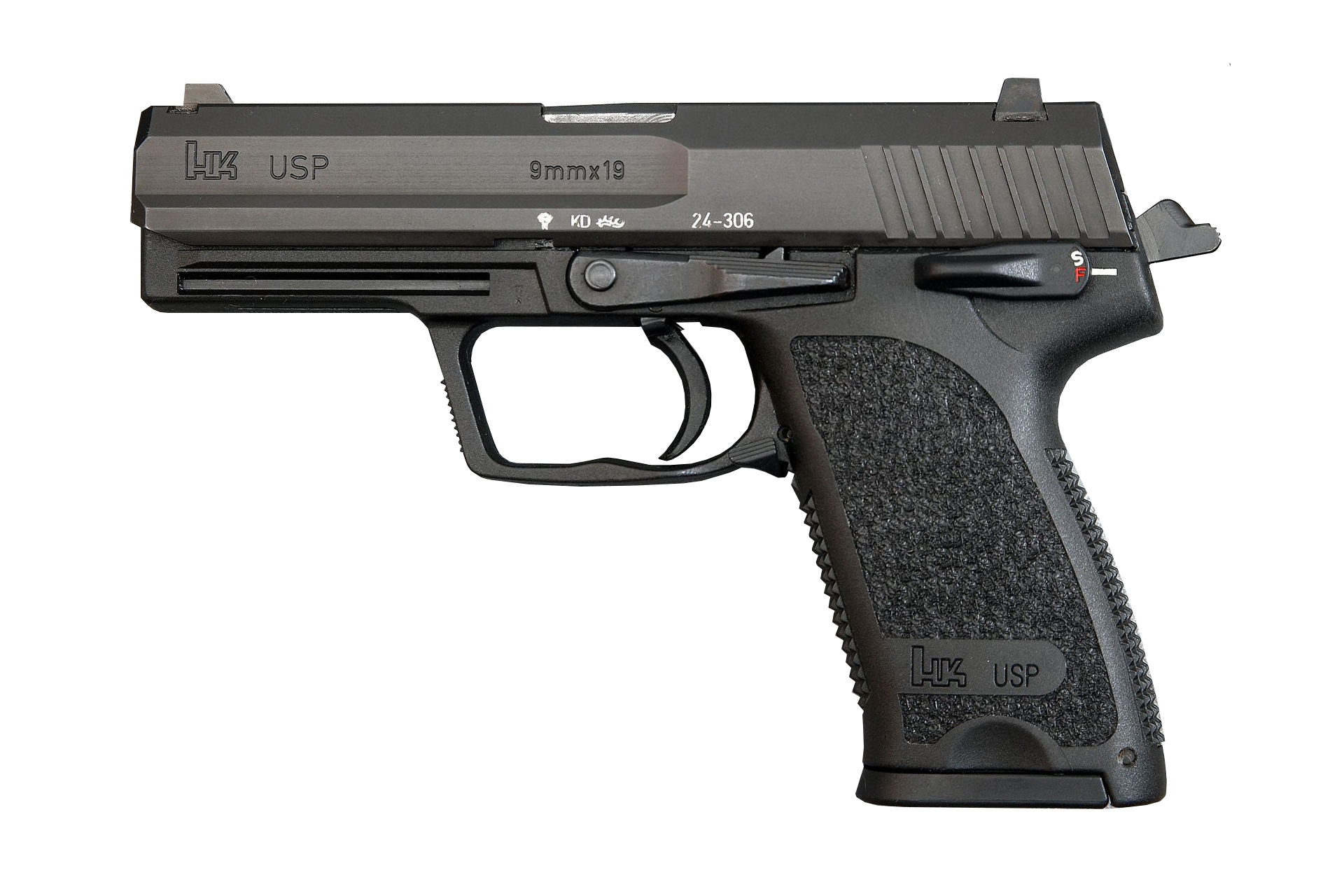
Heckler & Koch USP

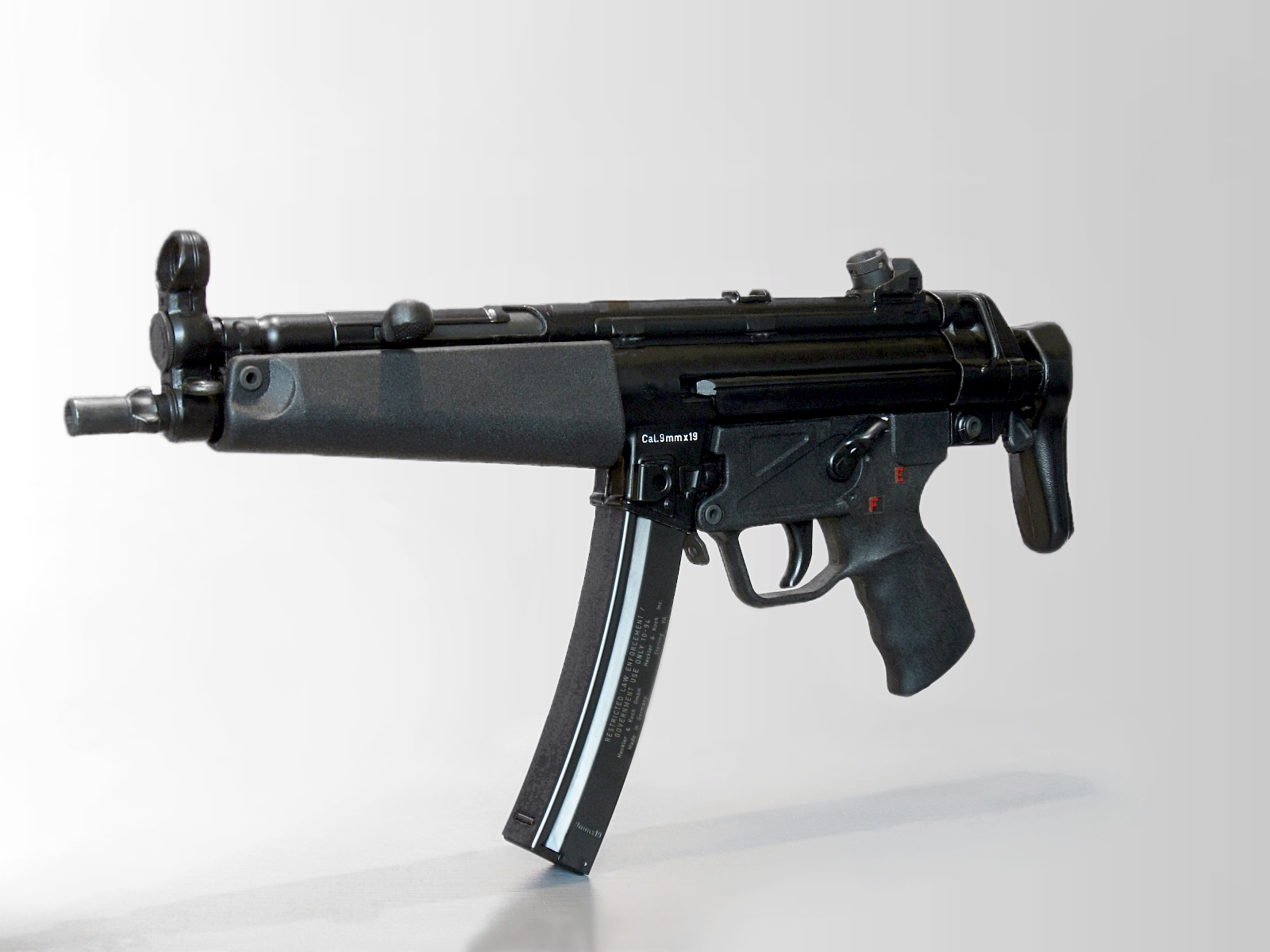
Heckler & Koch MP5

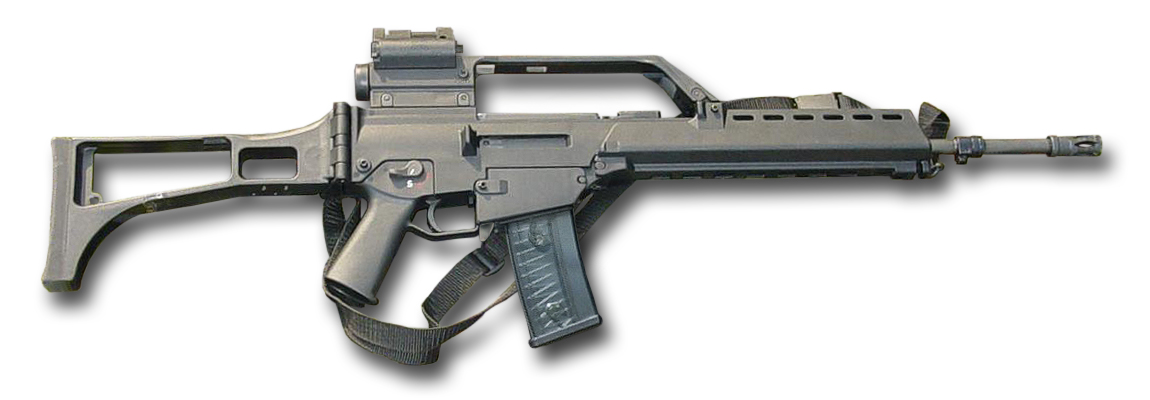
Heckler & Koch G36

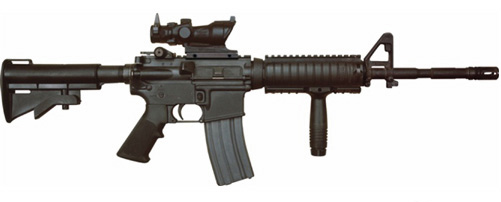
Colt/Elisco M4A1 5.56mm Assault Rifle

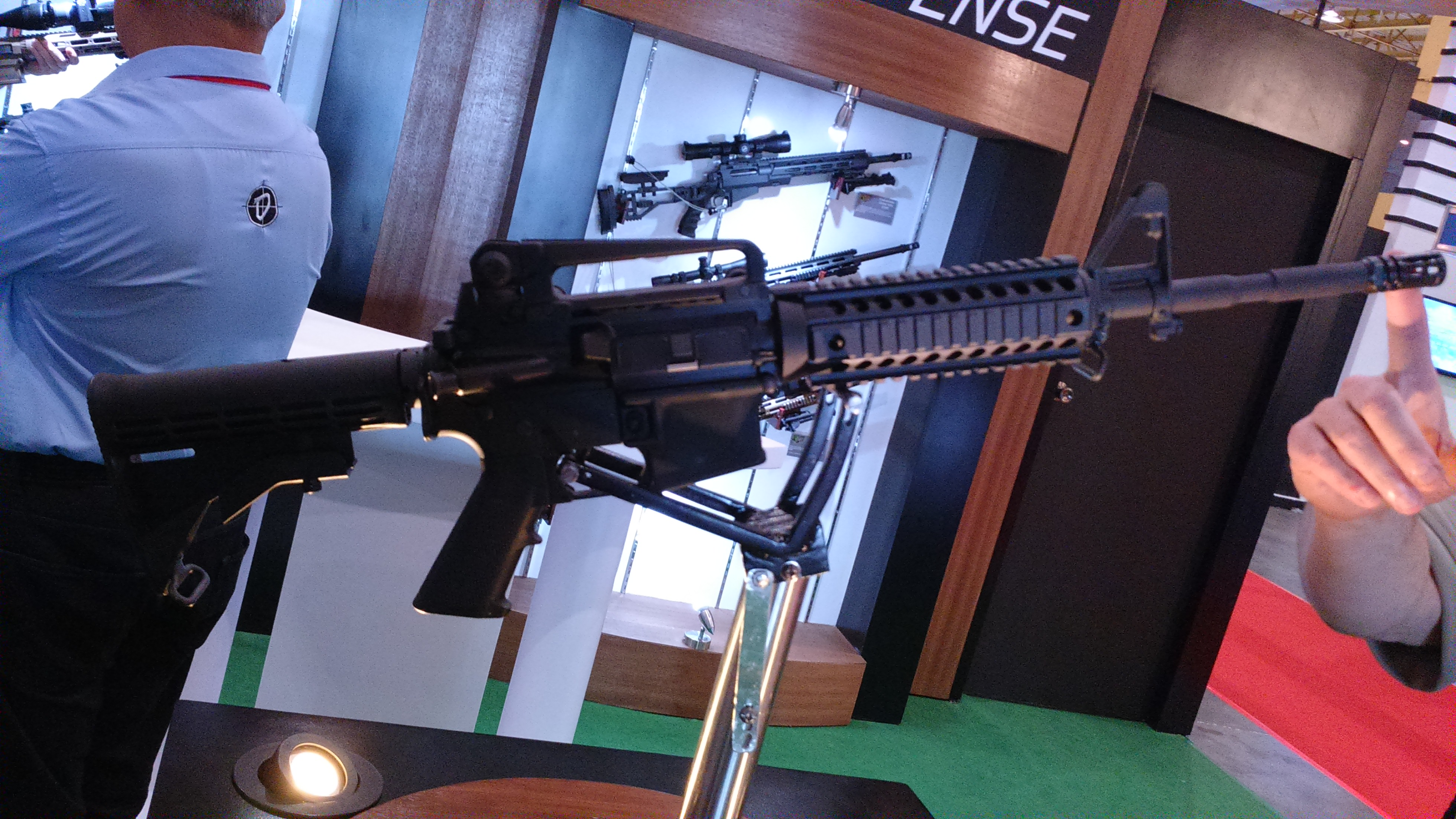
Remington R4 5.56mm Carbine

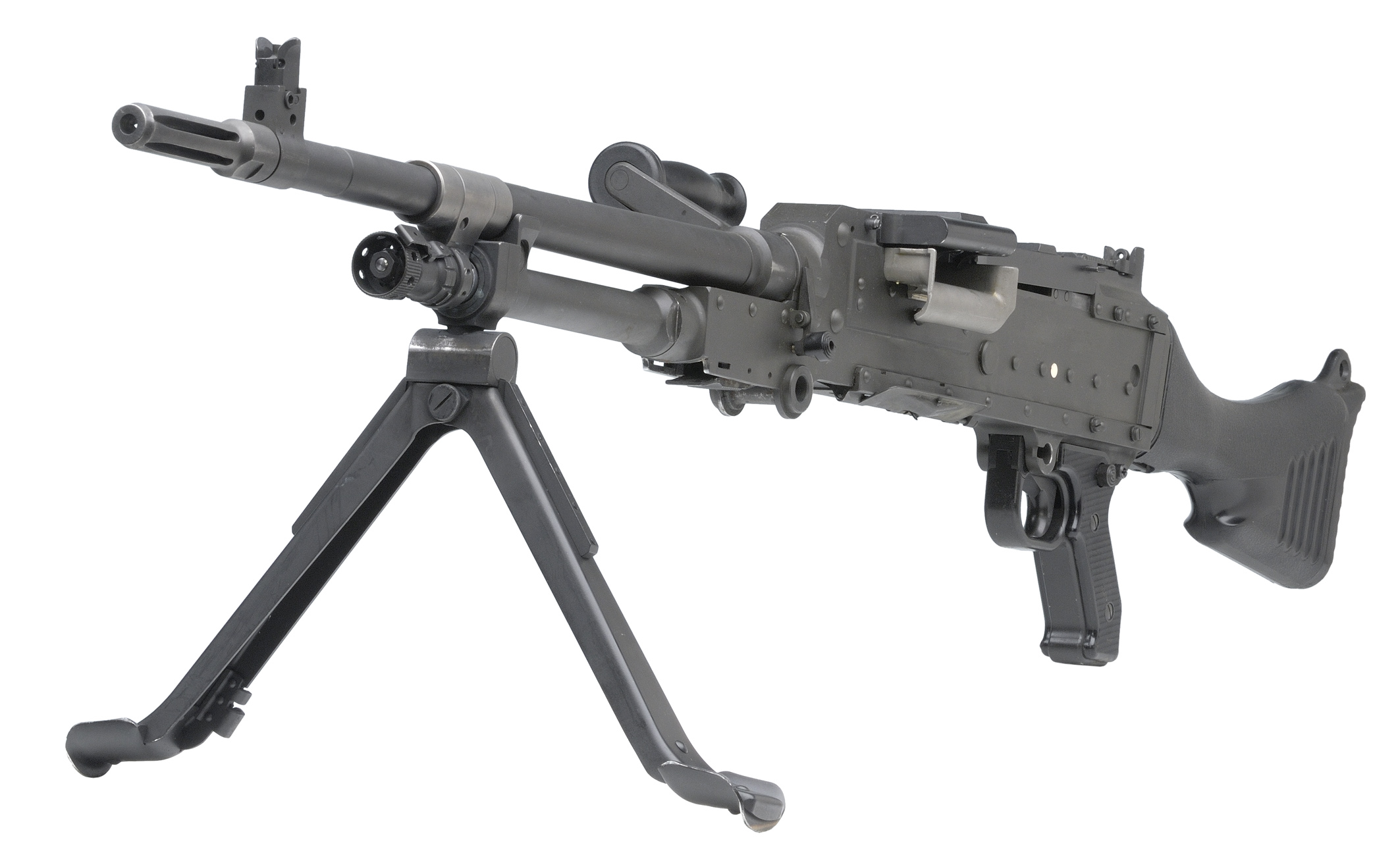
FN MAG

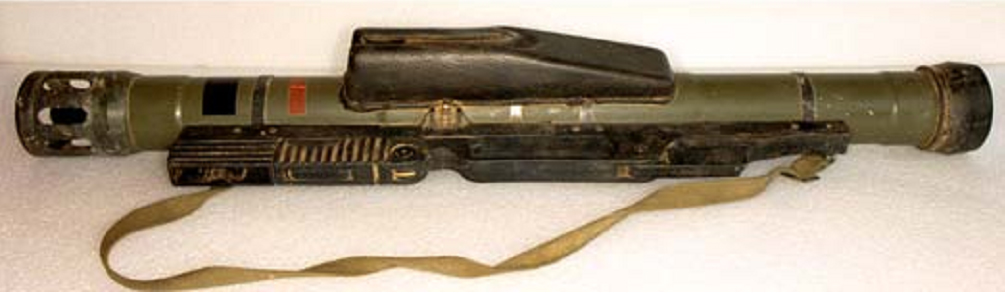
Armbrust

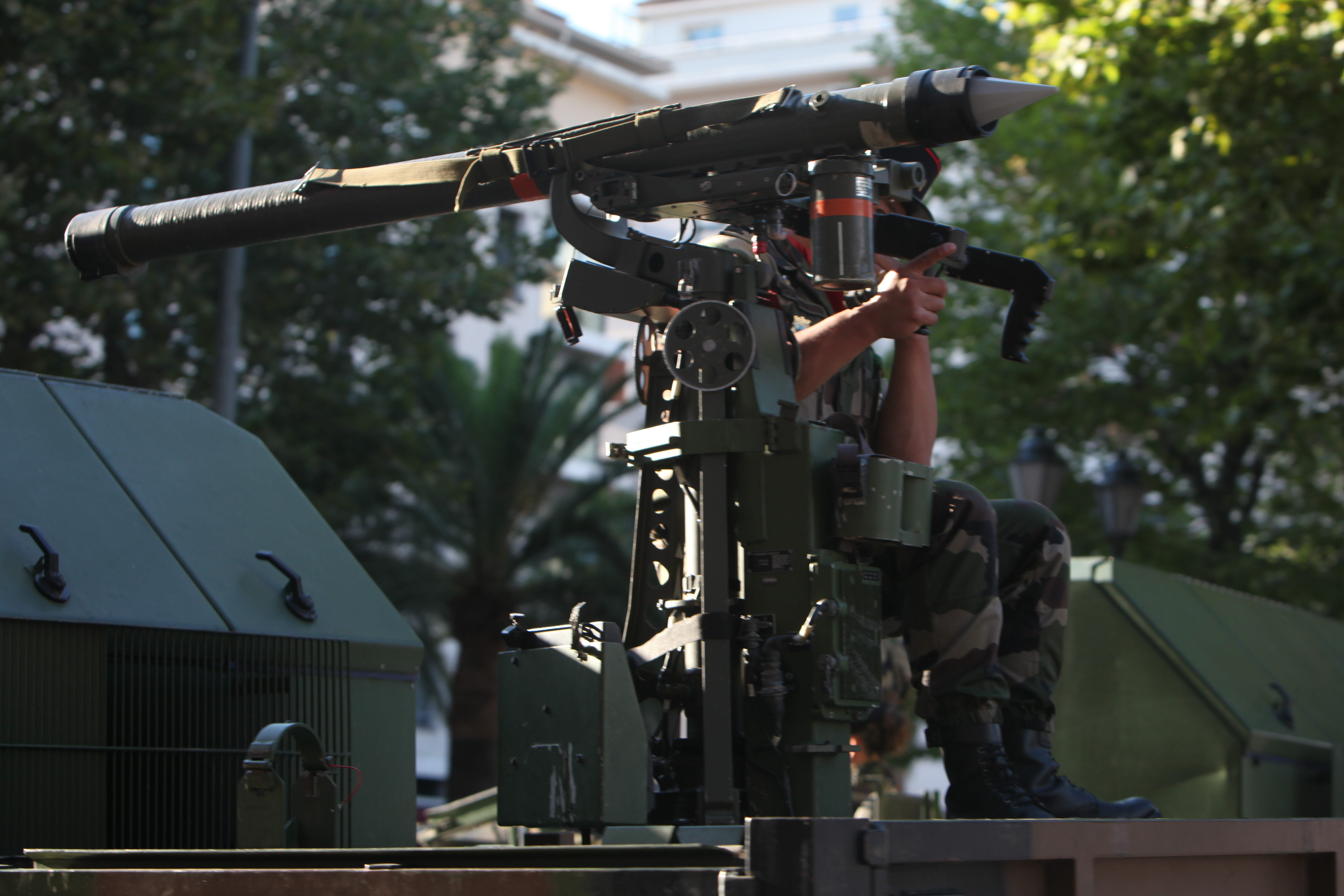
Mistral (missile)

The PSC utilizes Motorola trunked two-way radios with encryption capability.

== Vehicles ==
The PSC currently uses a fleet of vehicles, ranging from motorcycles; armored modified sedans and mid-sized vehicles; and armored personnel carriers.

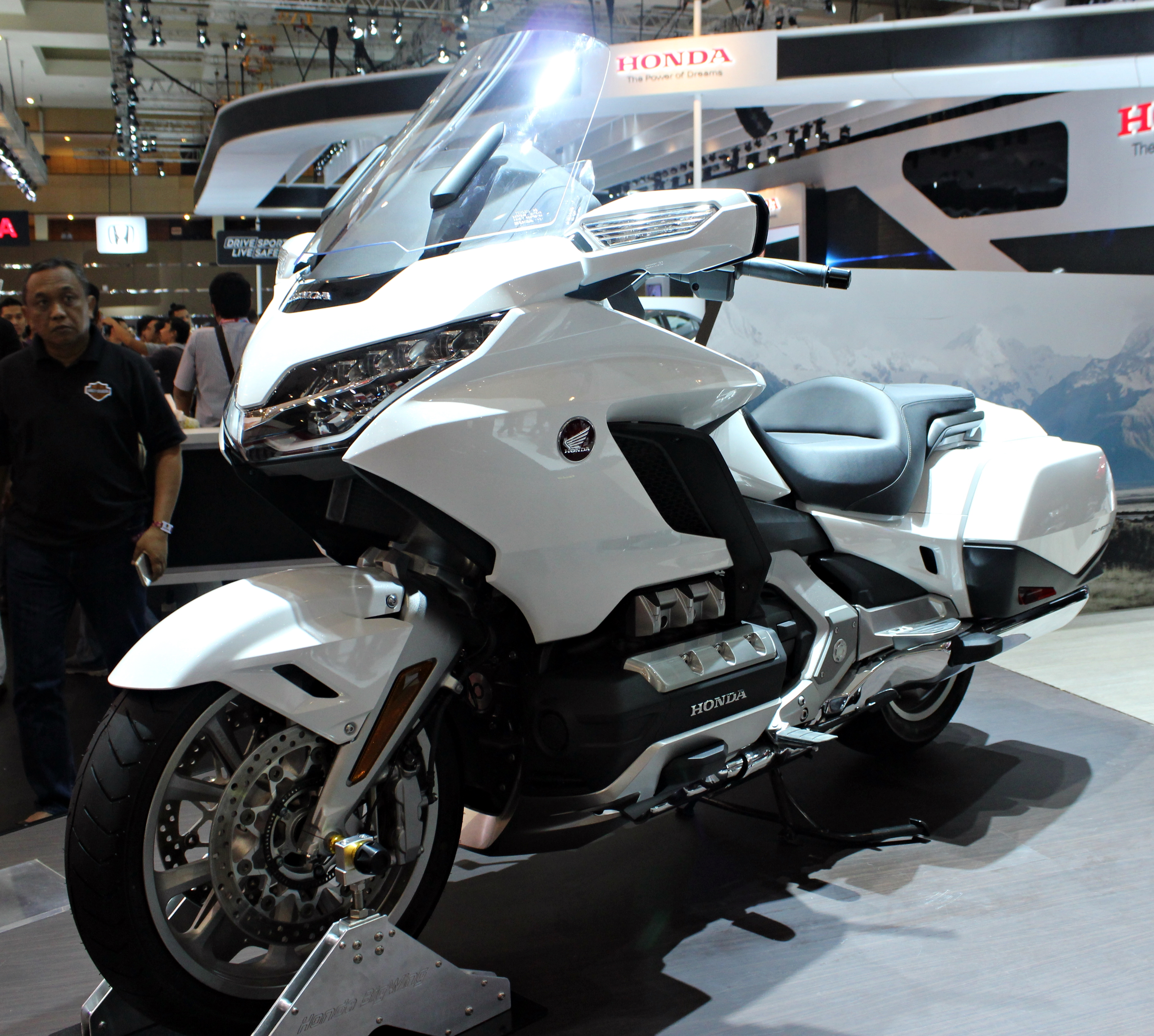
Honda Gold Wing

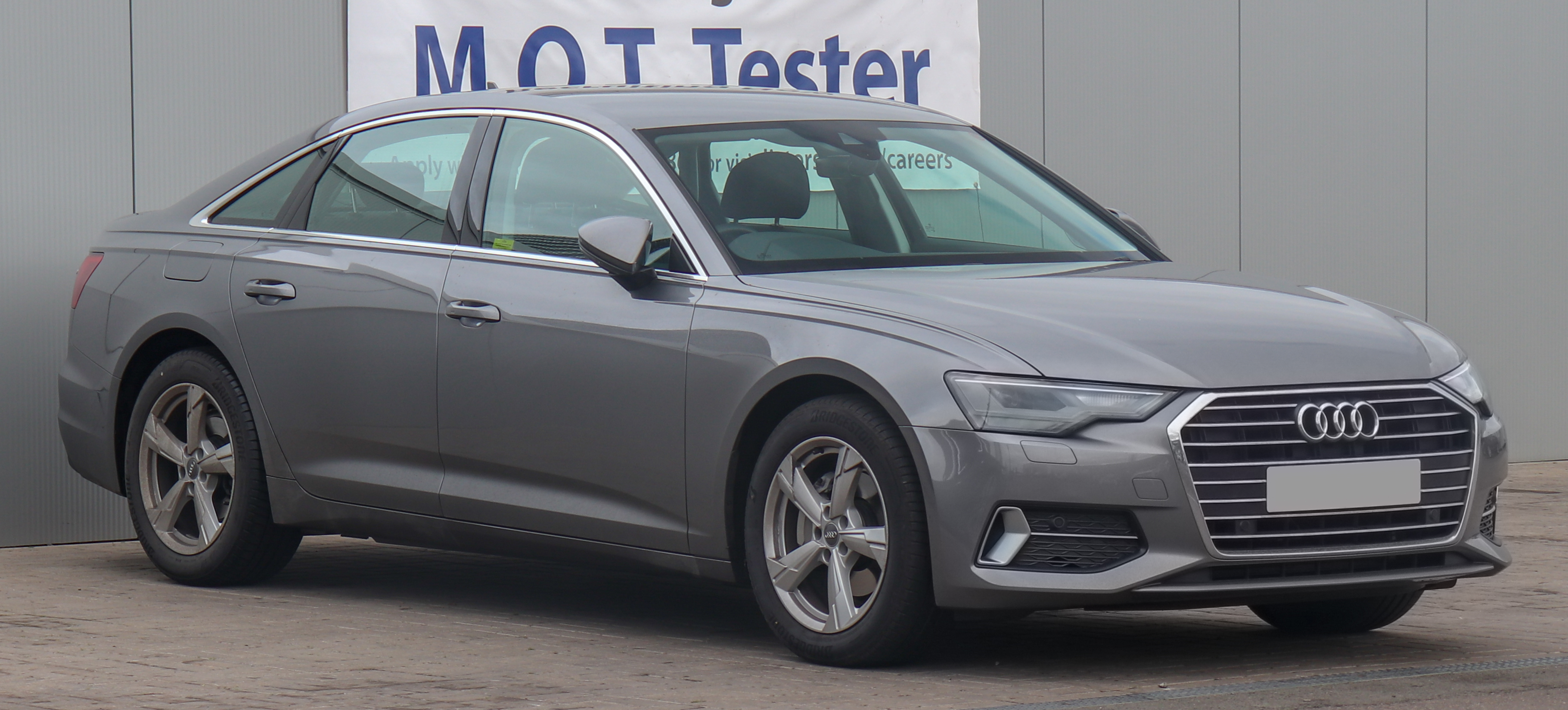
Audi A6

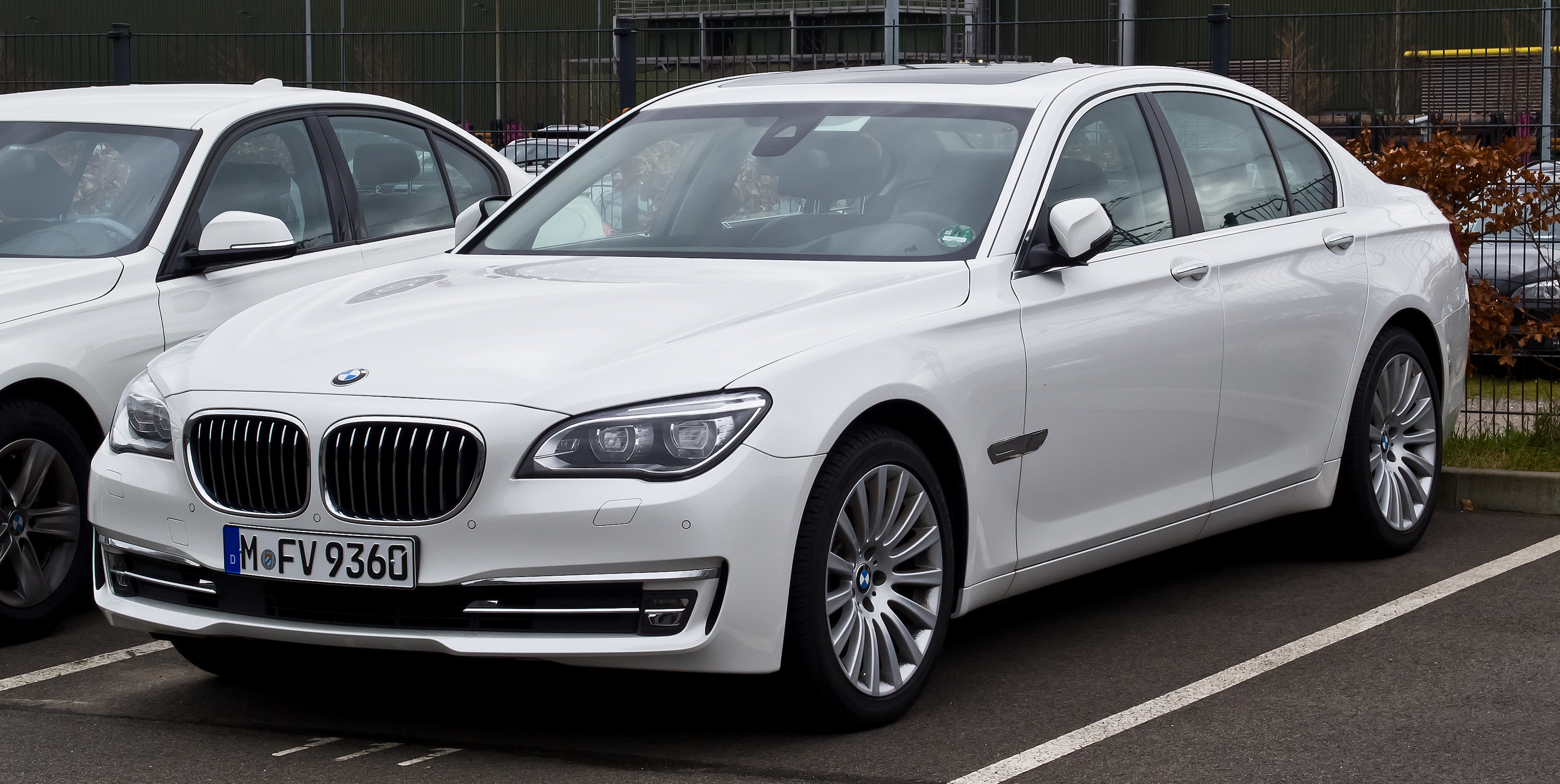
BMW 7 Series

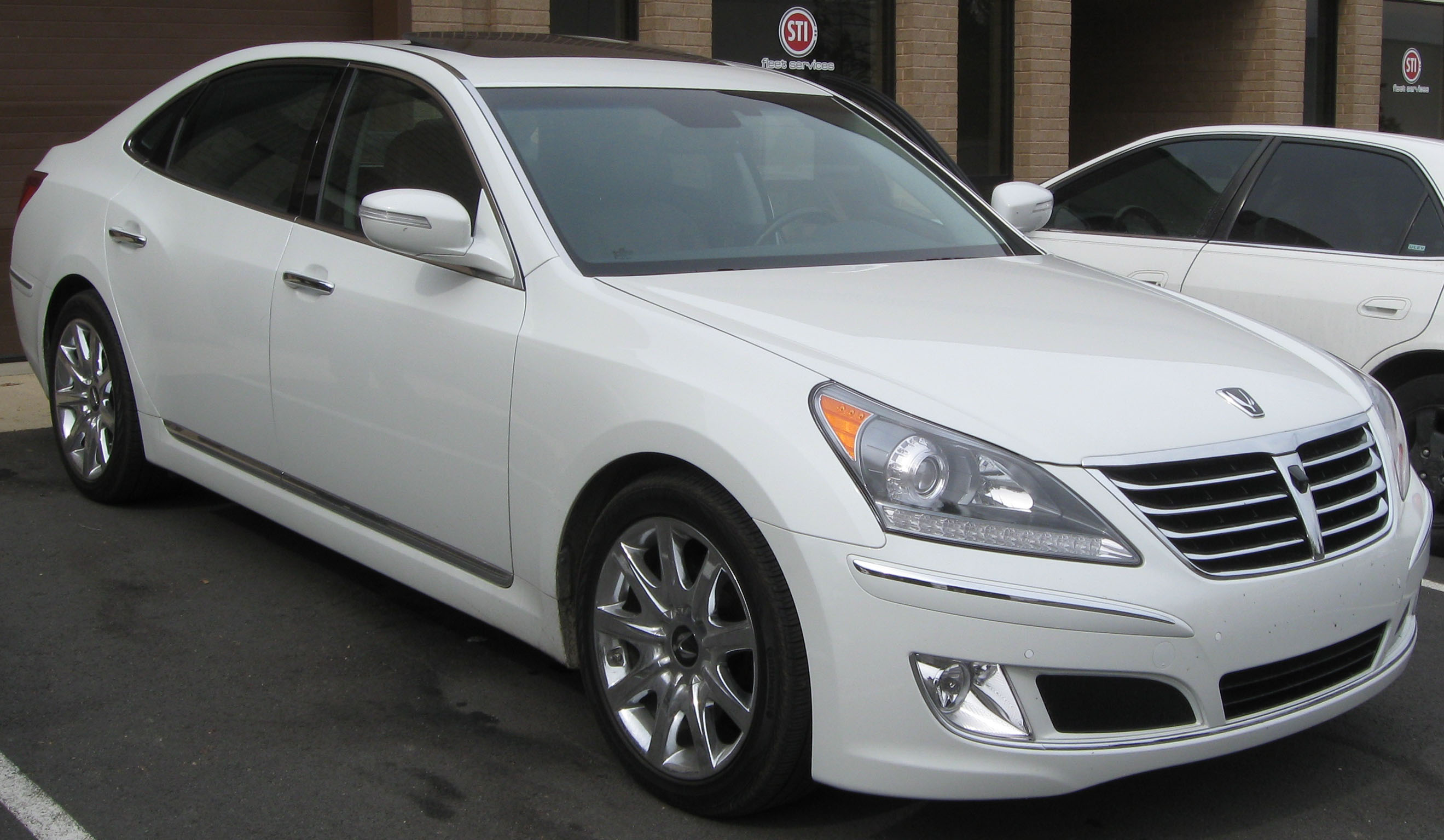
Hyundai Equus

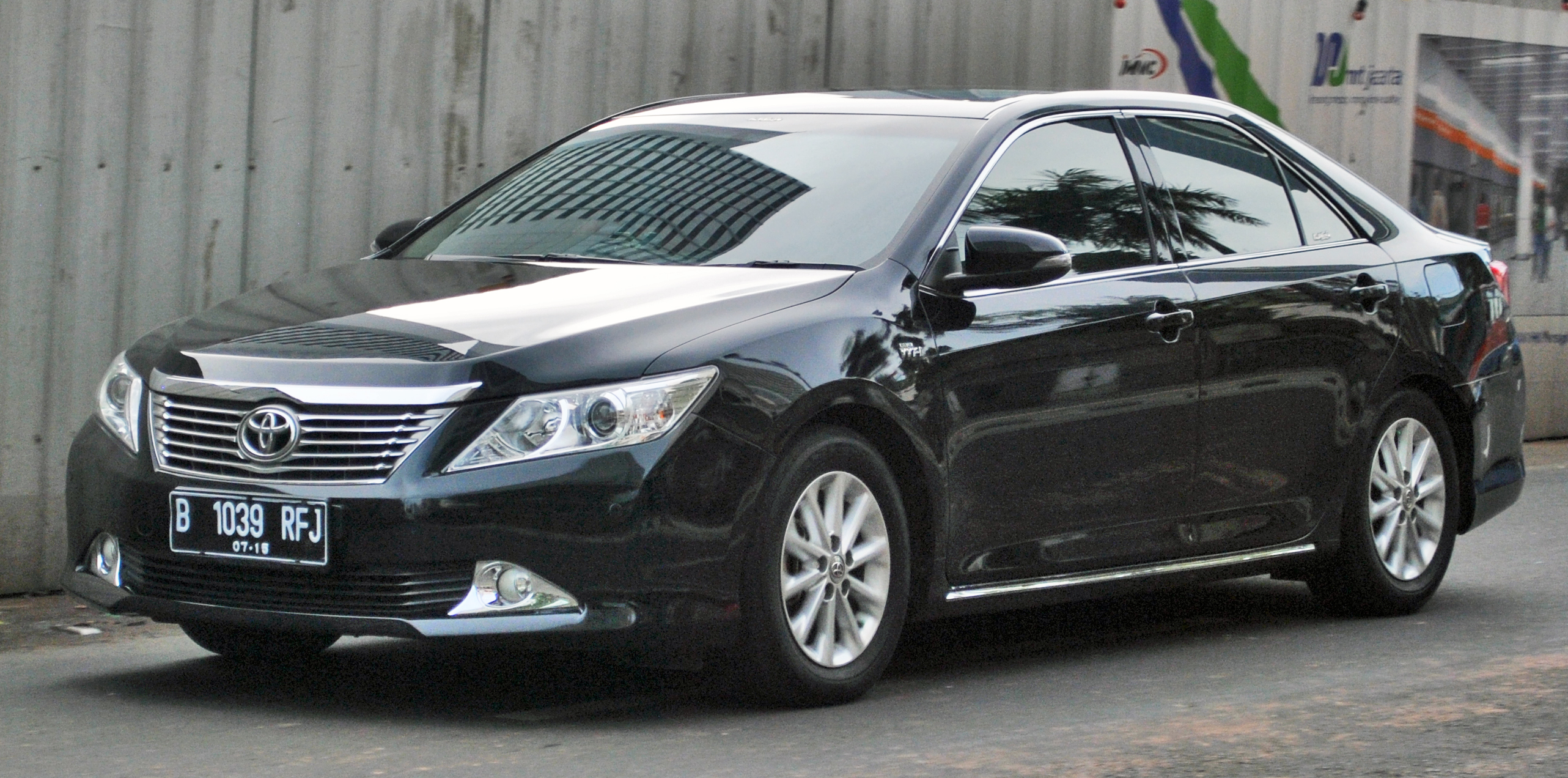
Toyota Camry

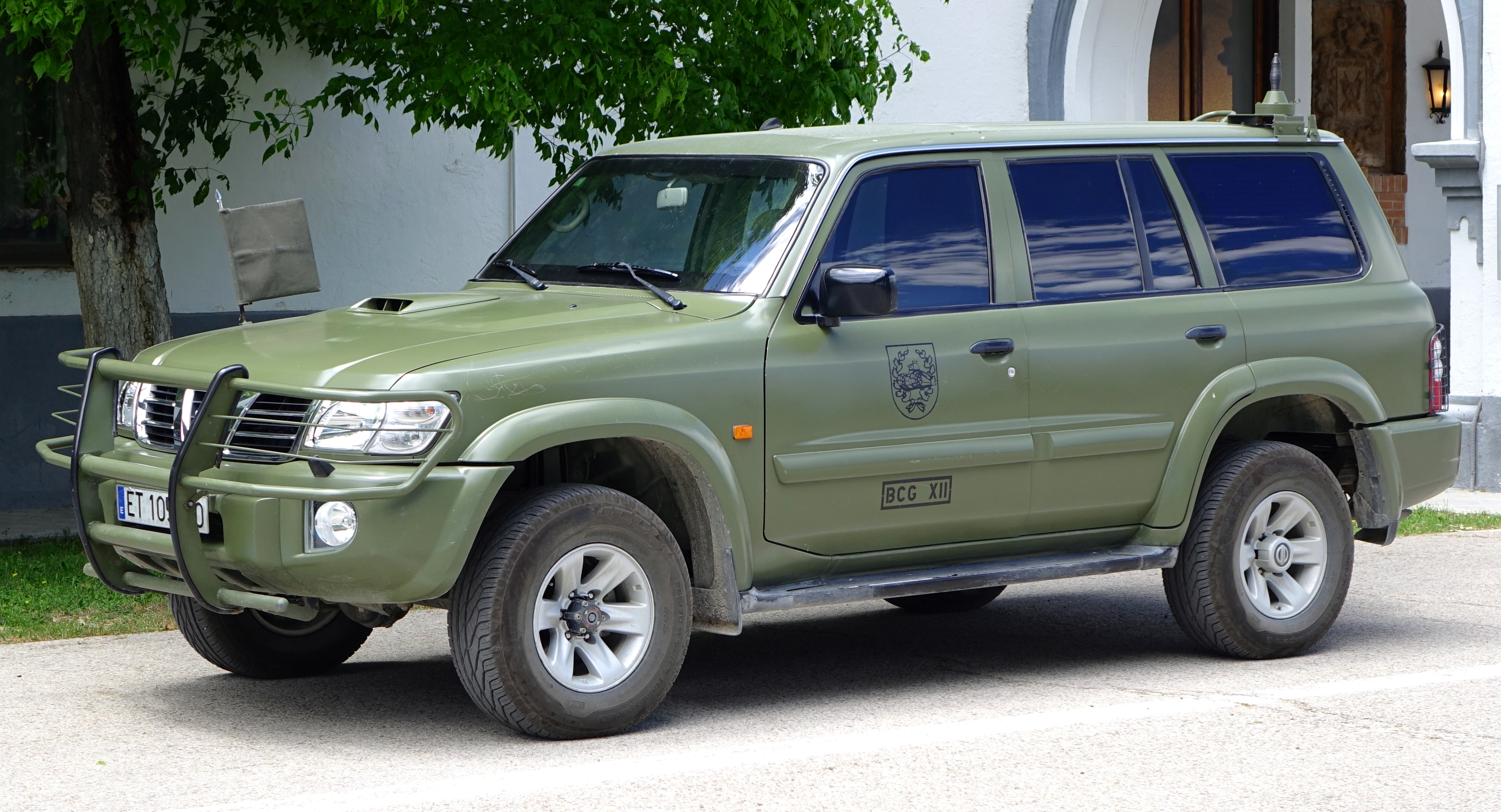
Nissan Patrol

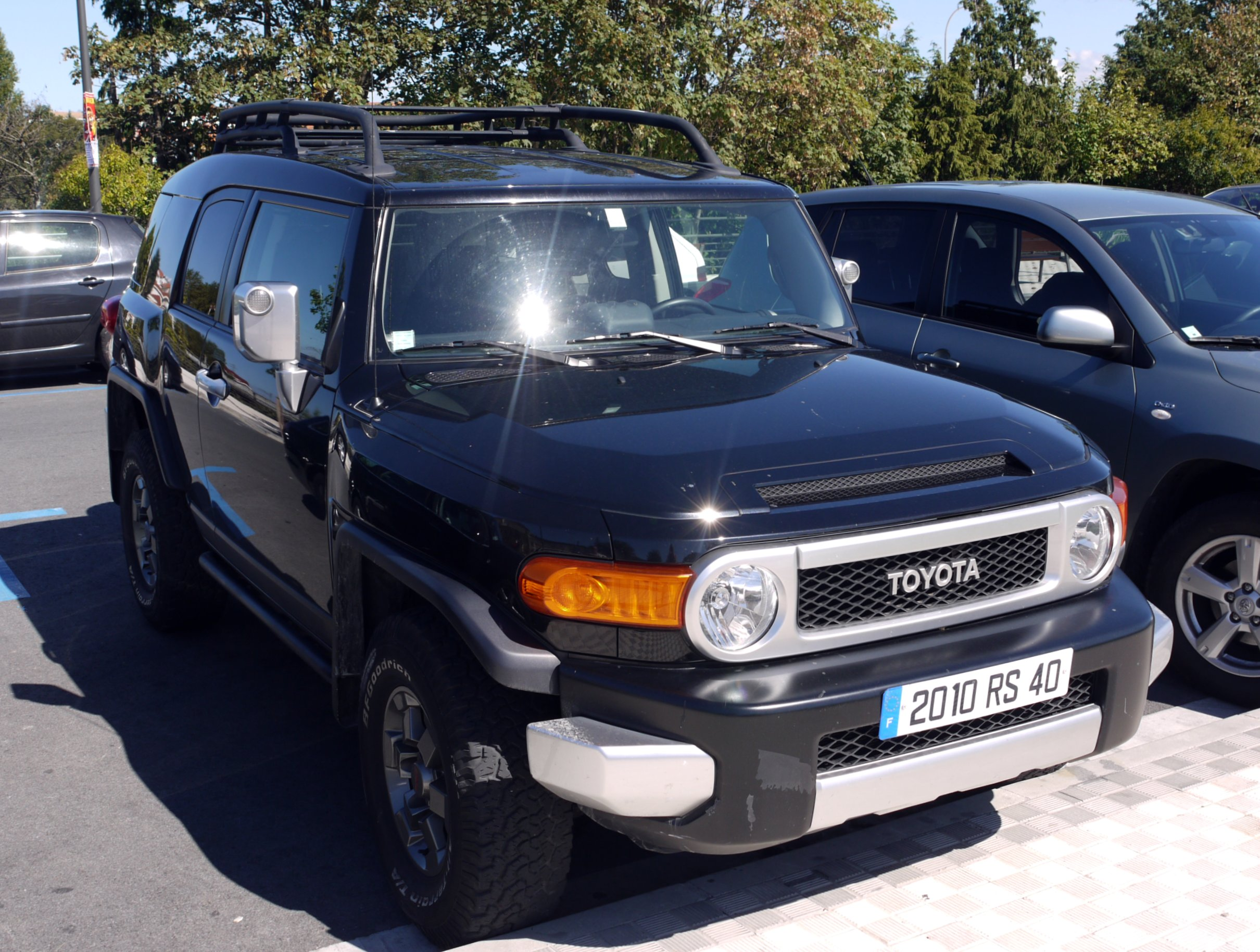
Toyota FJ Cruiser

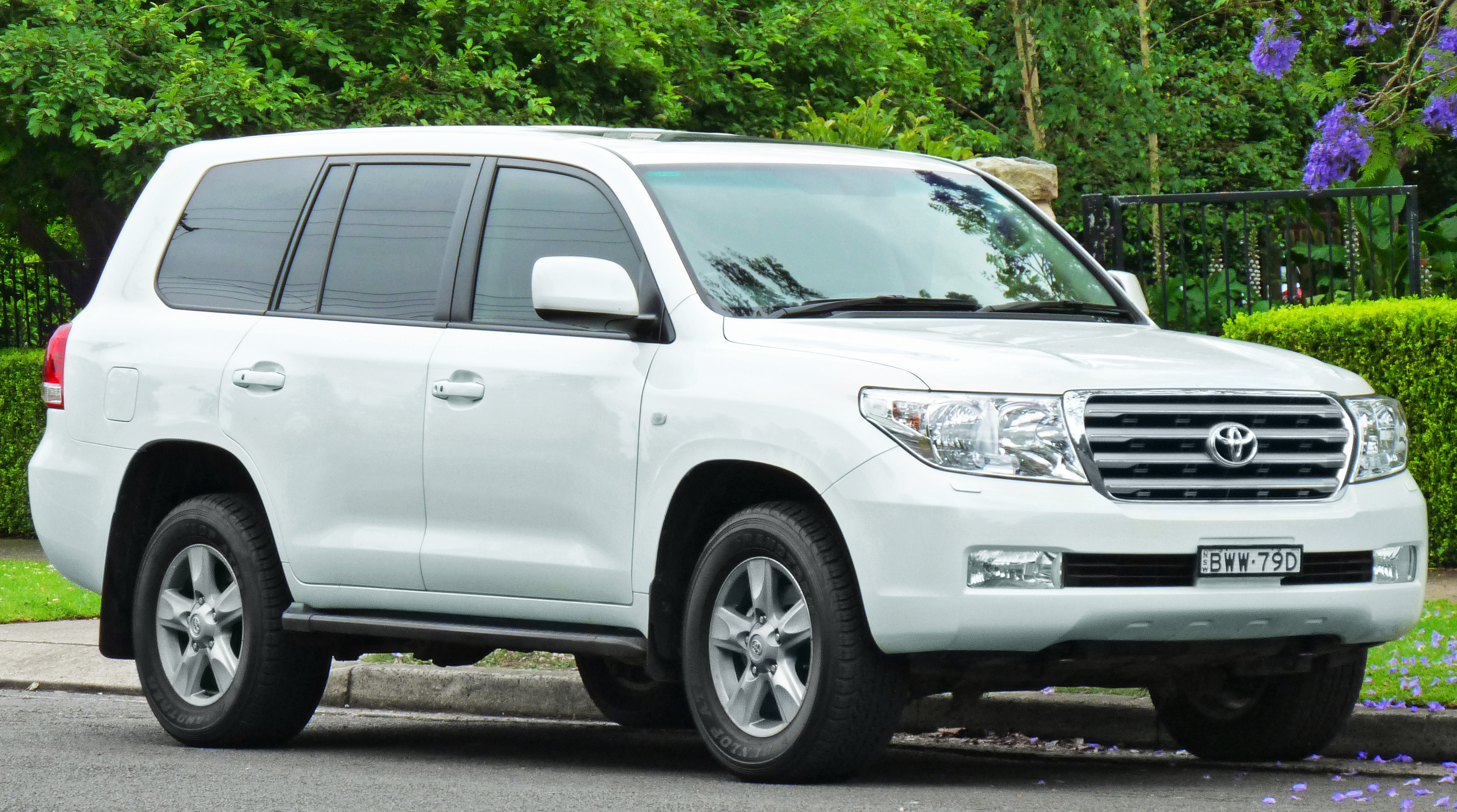
Toyota Land Cruiser

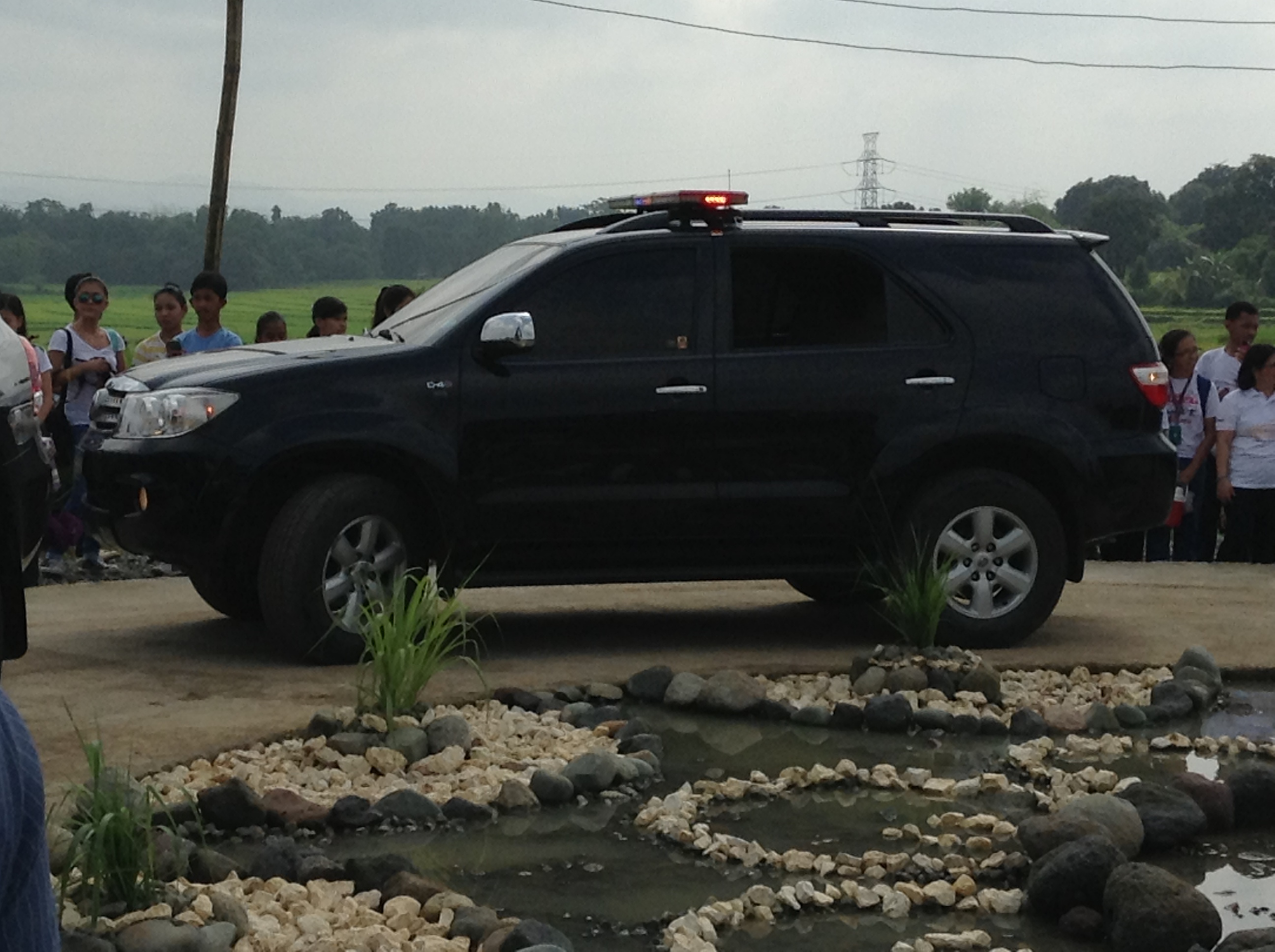
An unmarked Toyota Fortuner with a lightbar siren mounted on top of the SUV

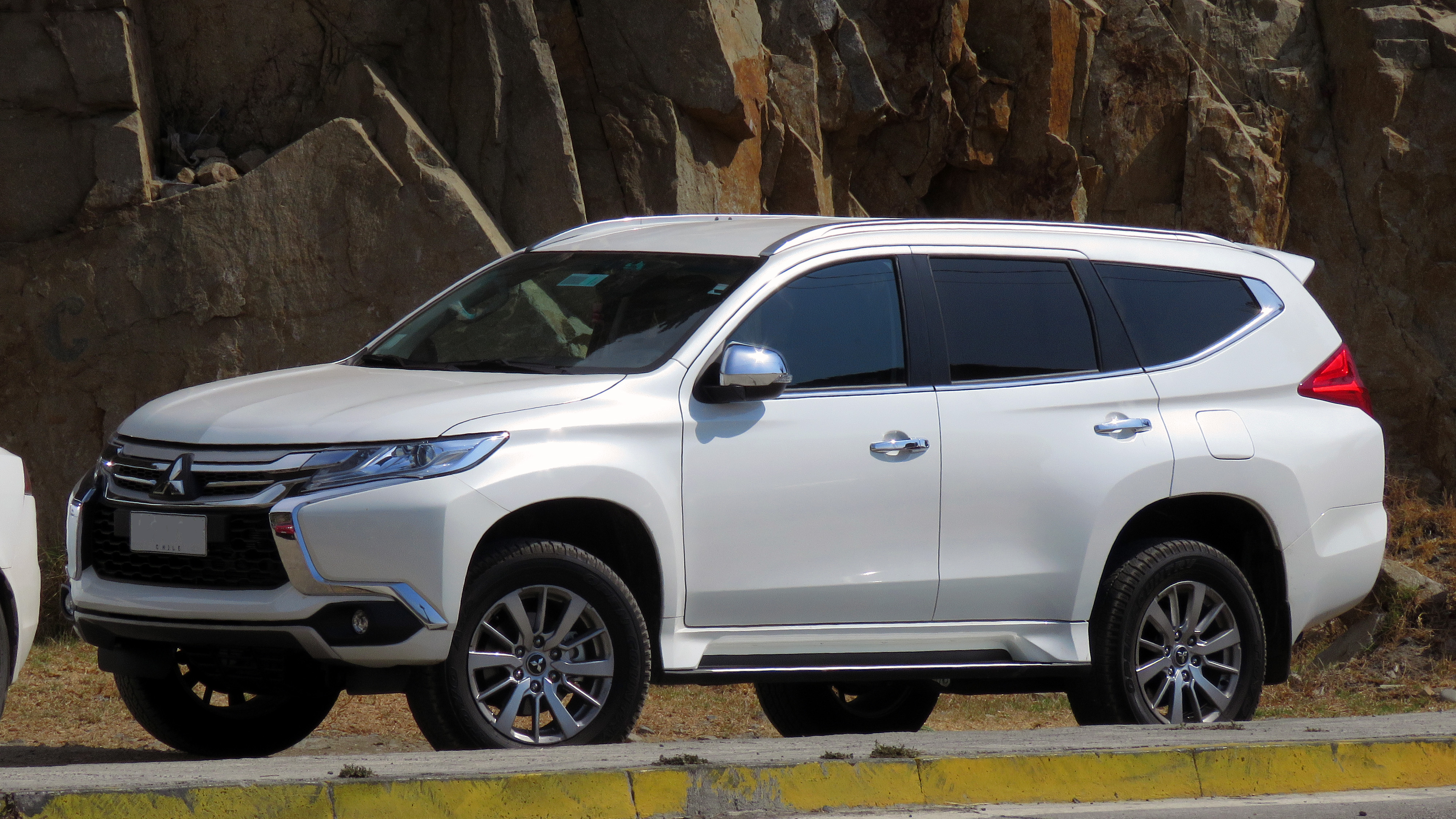
Mitsubishi Montero Sport

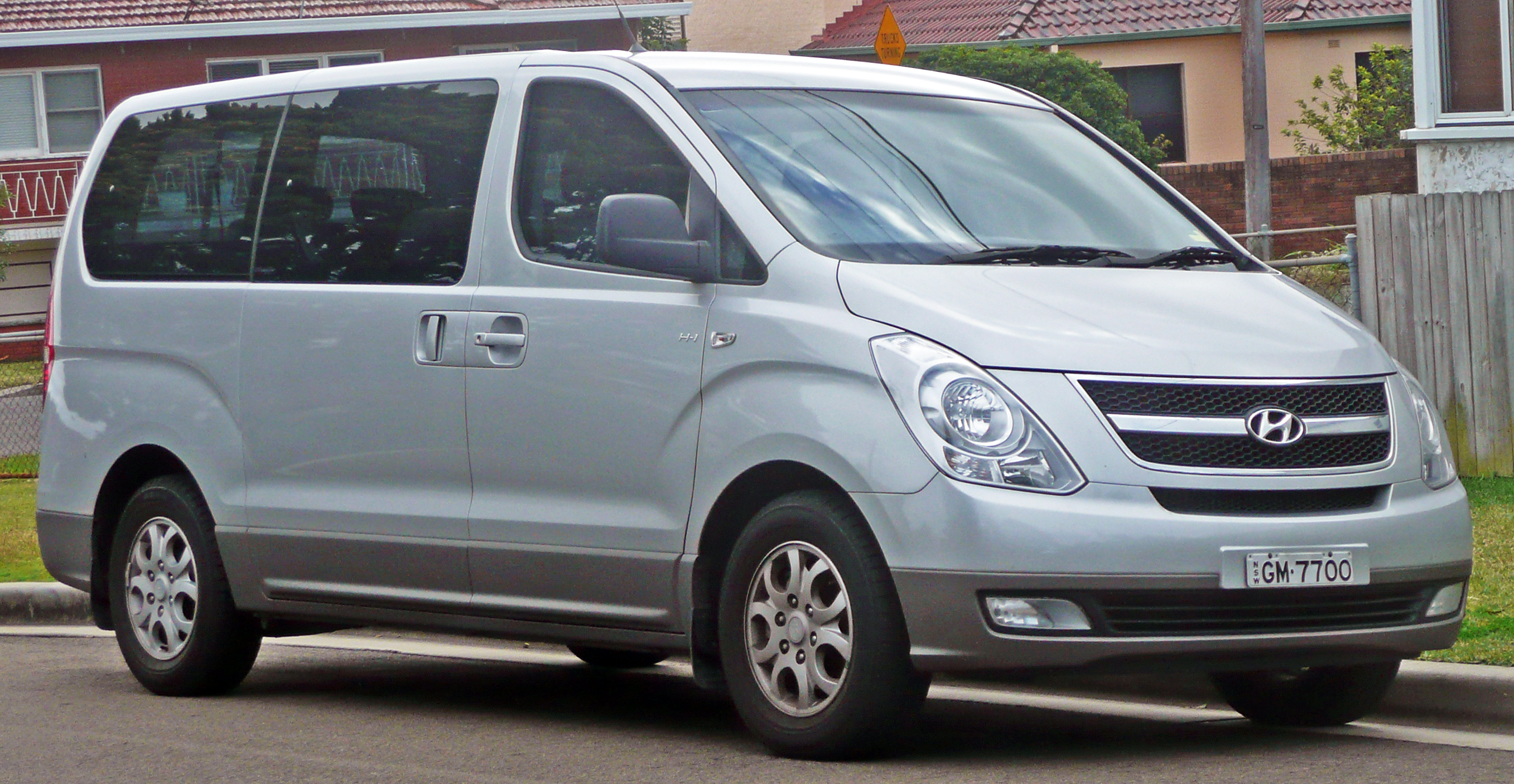
Hyundai Starex

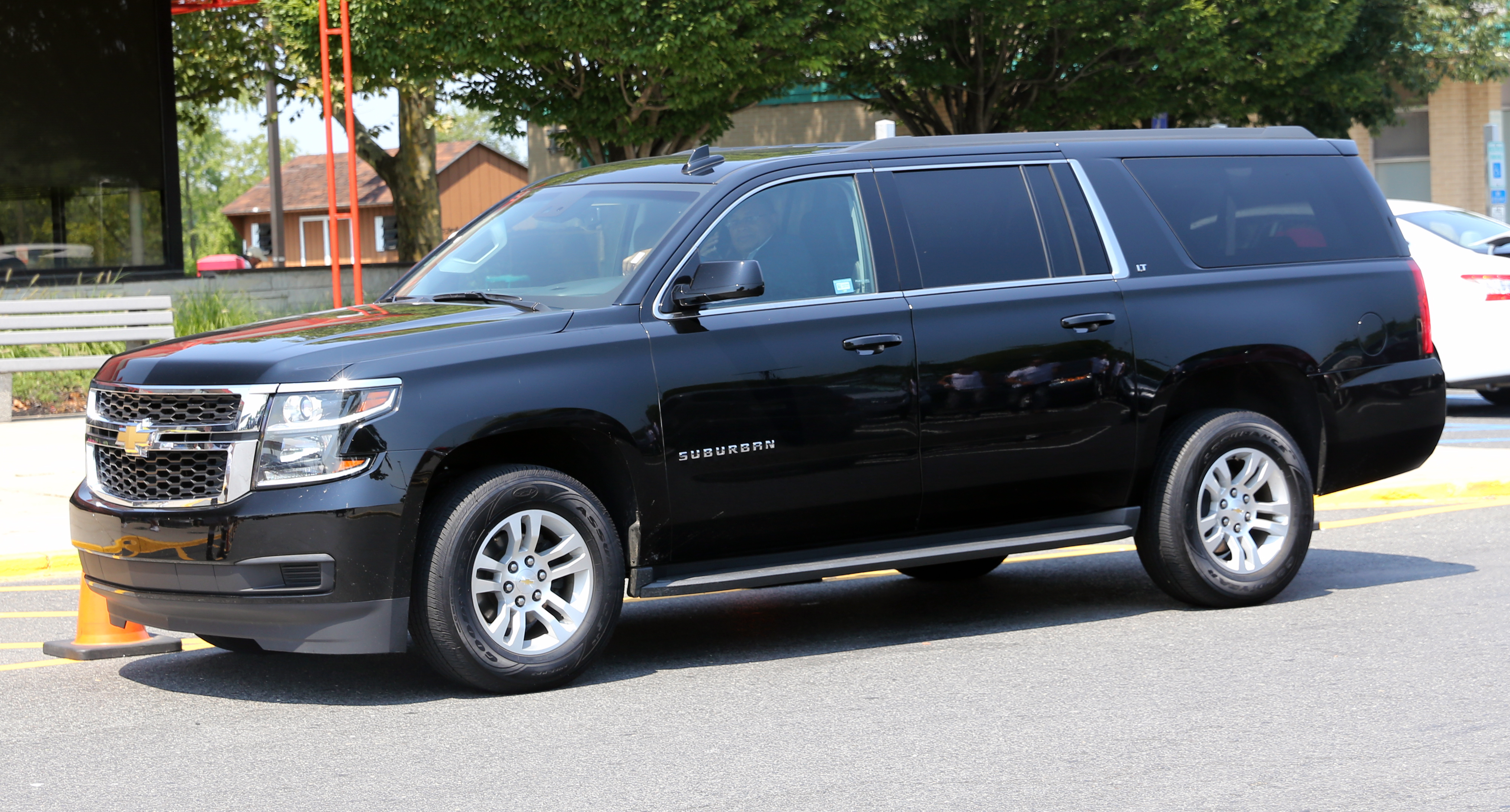
Chevrolet Suburban

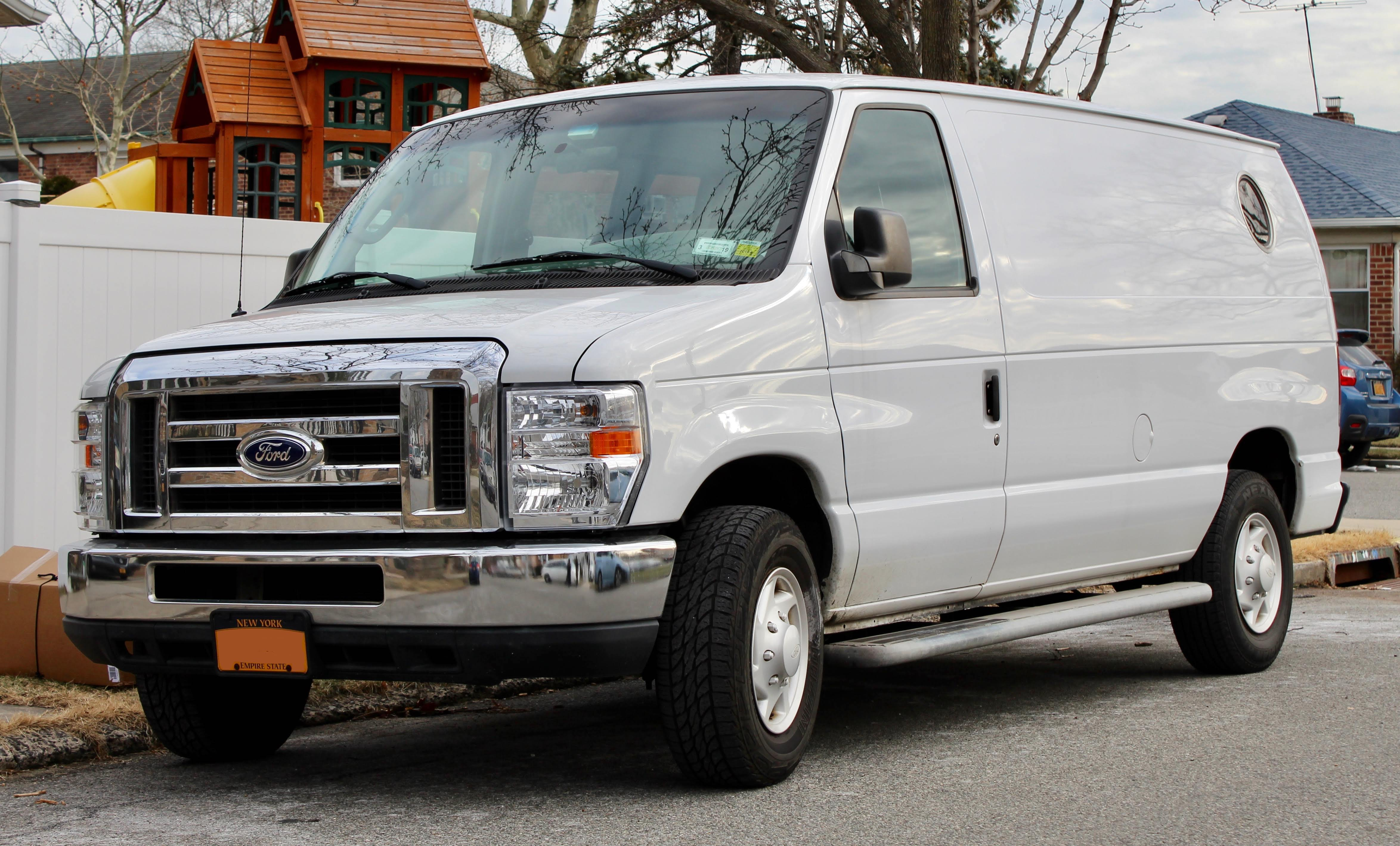
Ford E-250

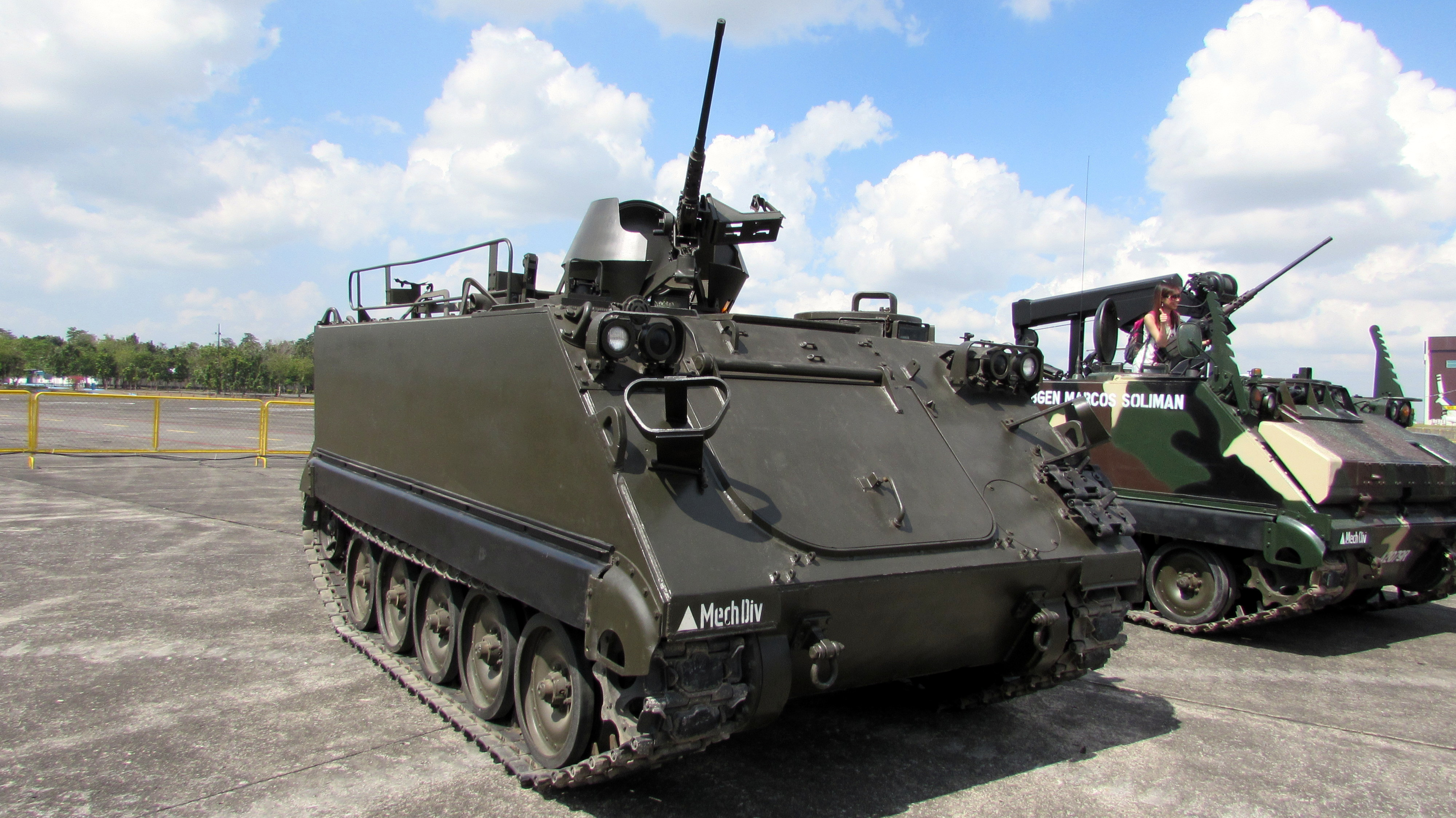
Philippine Army M113 armored personnel carrier

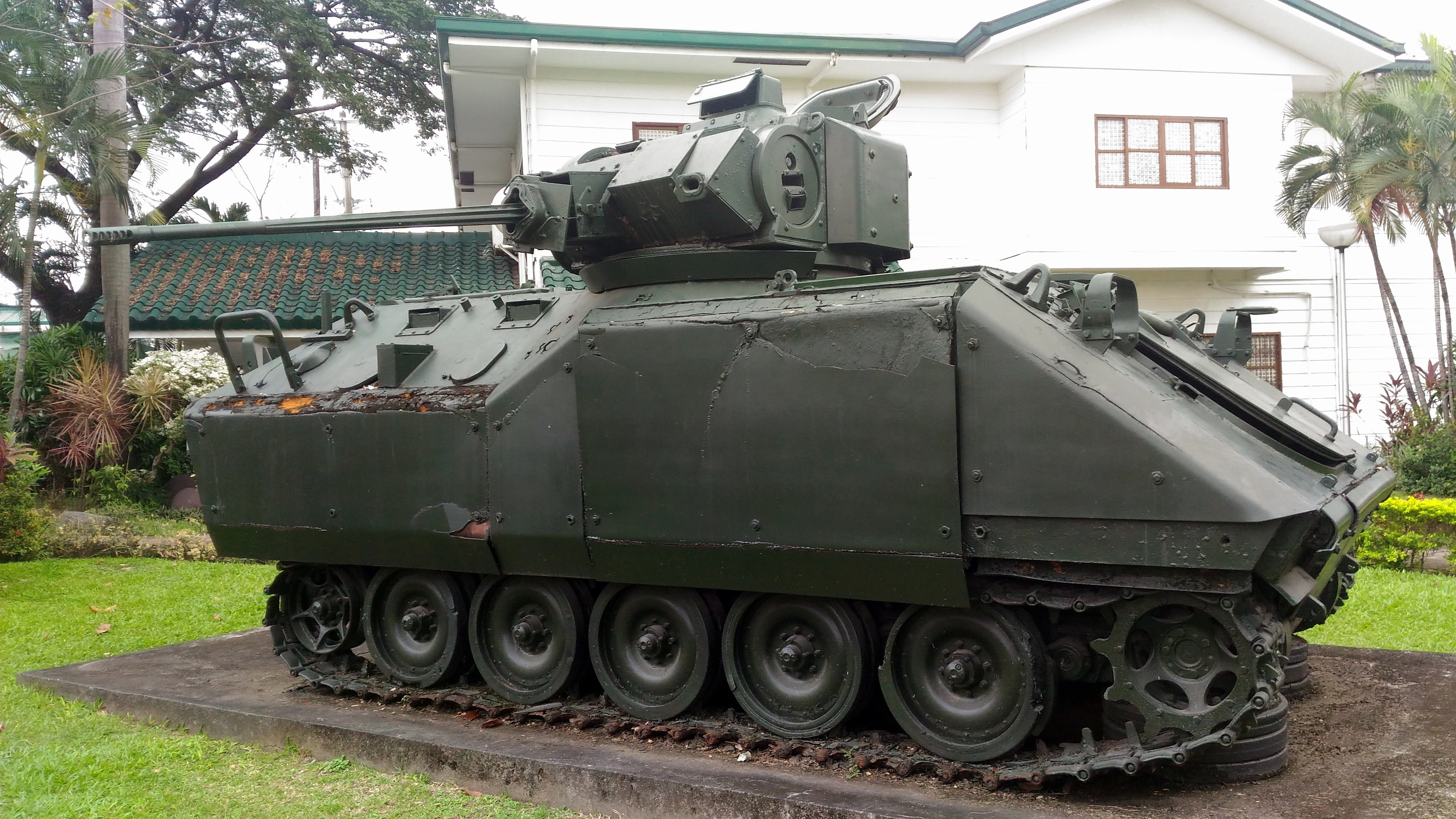
Philippine Army AIFV

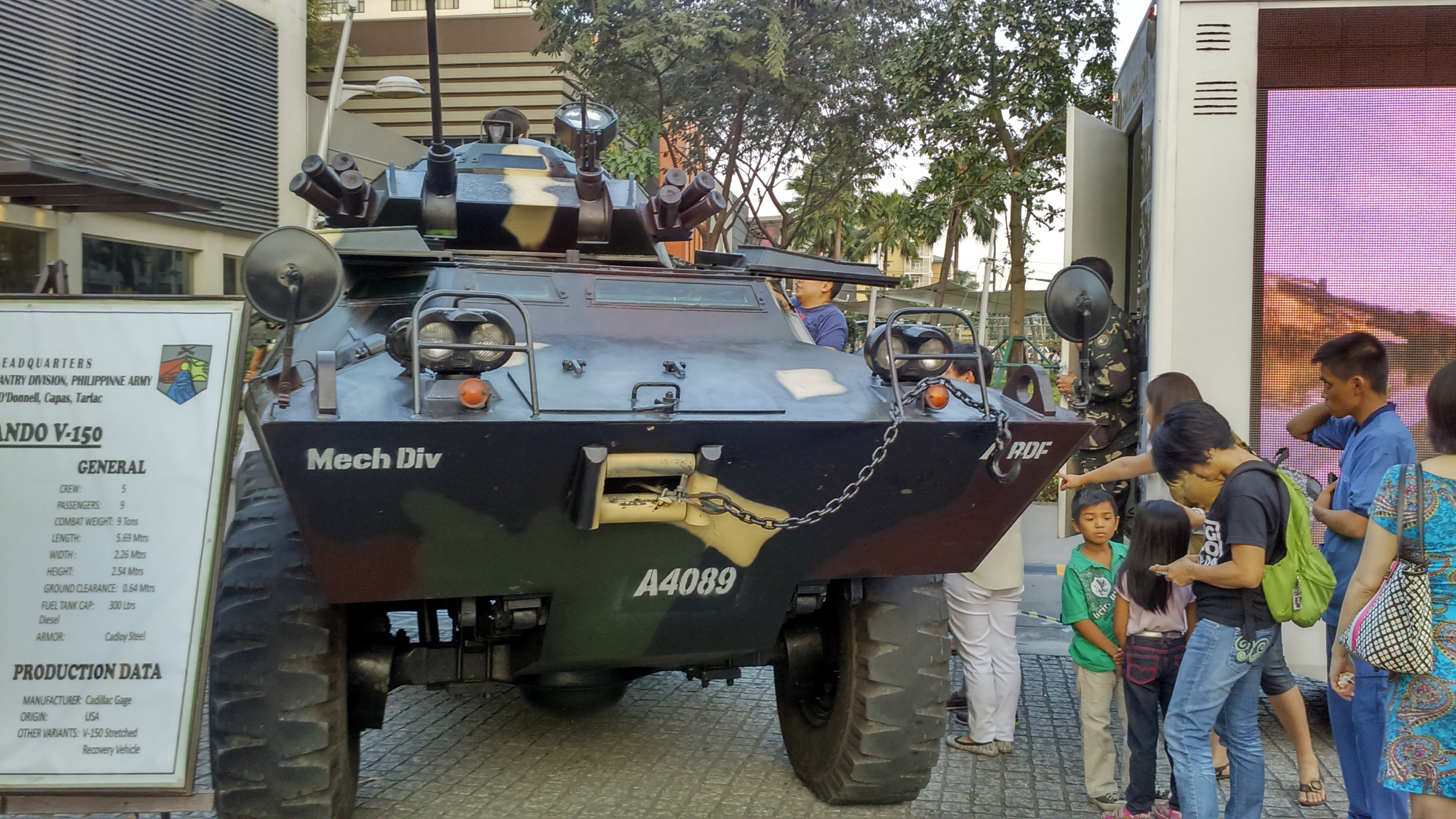
Philippine Army Cadillac Gage Commando
