= Special Reaction Unit =

The Special Reaction Unit is a part of the Presidential Security Command, which serves as its main counter-terrorist unit among the other nine organic units. It's not to be confused with the Special Reaction Unit of the Philippine National Police's Maritime Group, since they share the same name.

From time to time, the SRU has been called in to assist other Philippine law enforcement/military units in internal security activities and duties when their presence is needed.

== History ==
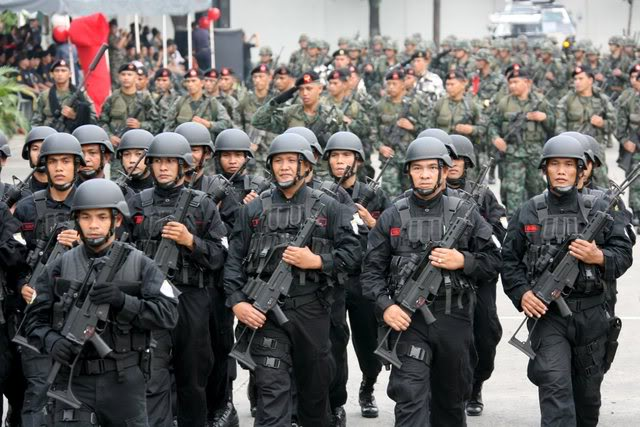
PSG SRU operators march during a parade in counter-terrorist combat gear. Note that they're marching with a mix of G36 and G36C assault rifles.

The Special Reaction Unit was organized in 1988 with the officers and enlisted personnel from Presidential Security Group's Echo Company, Presidential Guards and 14th SR Company, First Scout Ranger Regiment, Philippine Army. Then Captain Jessie Dellosa was its first commanding officer. Captain Dellosa became Chief of Staff AFP during the term of President Benigno S Aquino III. Captain Alan Purisima of the defunct Philippine Constabulary was its first executive officer. Purisima rose to the rank of Director General, PNP, The SRU had been used to defend the Philippine government, which has been done during the anti-President Cory Aquino coup attempt.

There was a previous plan to arm SRU operators with United Defense Manufacturing Corporation-made M4 assault rifles, but the plan fell through because the SRU was armed with foreign-made assault rifles. The SRU has conducted CQB training in 2010 despite the presence of Typhoon Juan.

== Known Commanding Officers ==
- Captain Jessie Dellosa Philippine Army 1988-1992
