= Protests against Rodrigo Duterte =

Political protests against former Philippine President Rodrigo Duterte

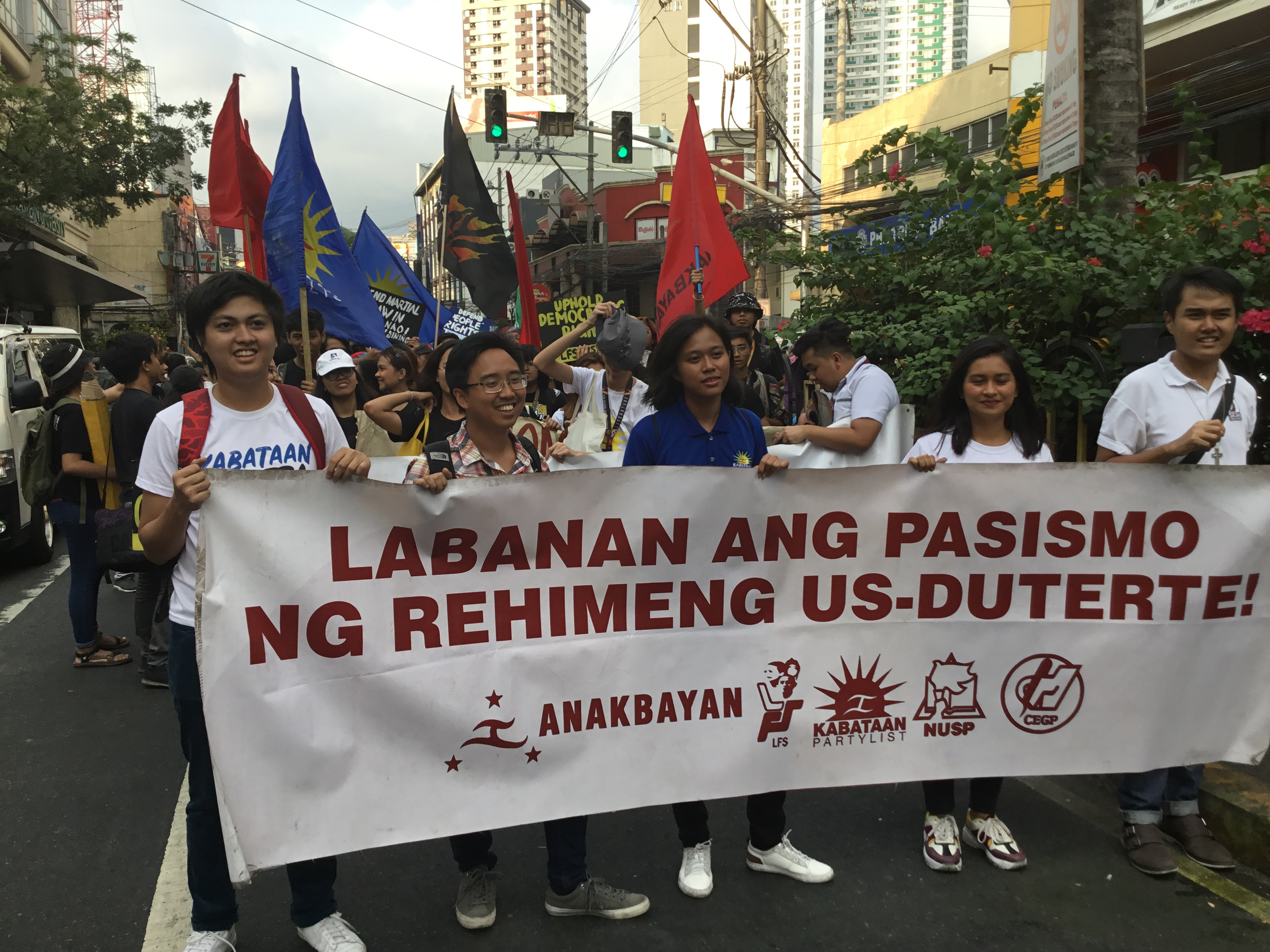
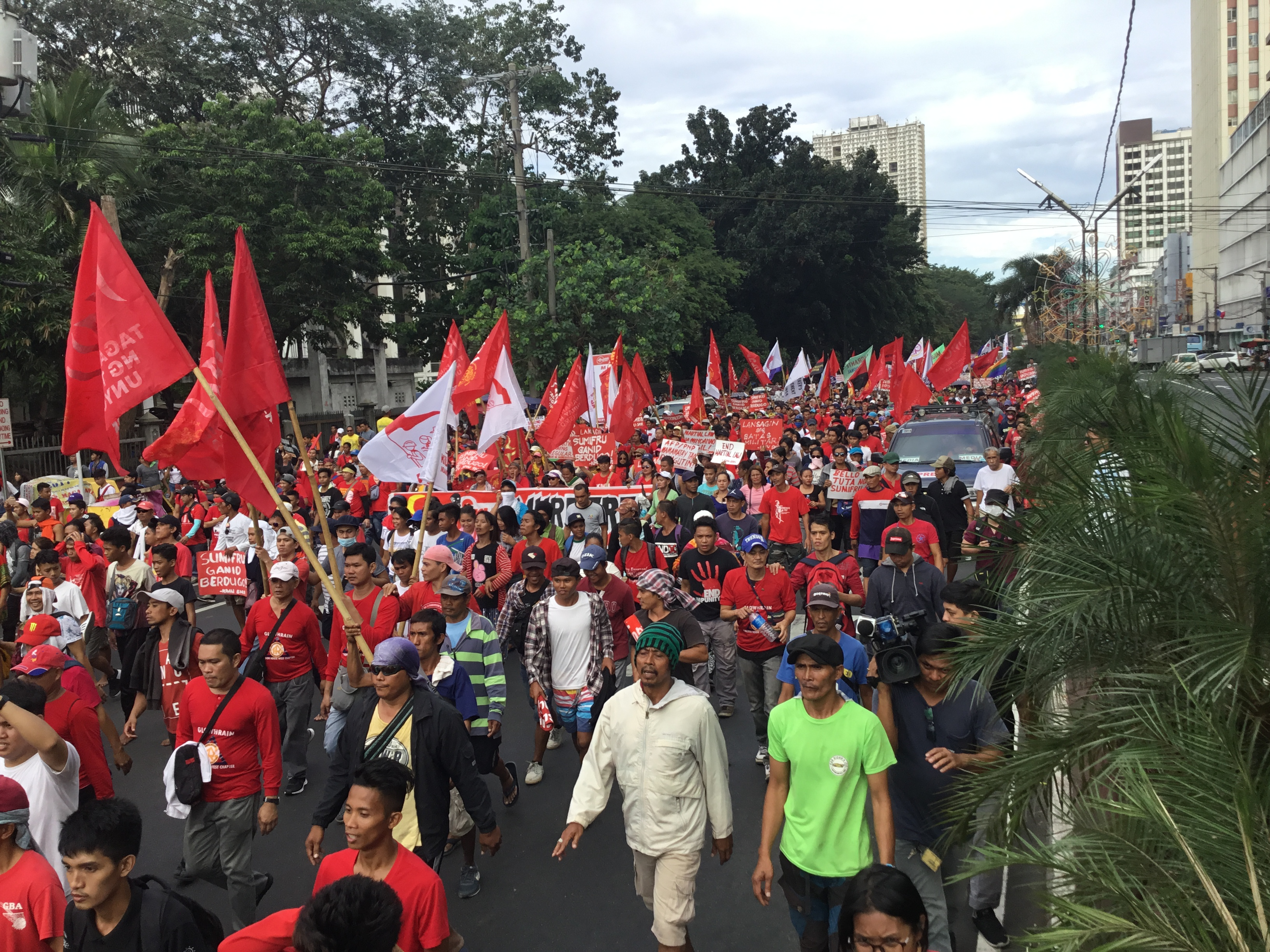
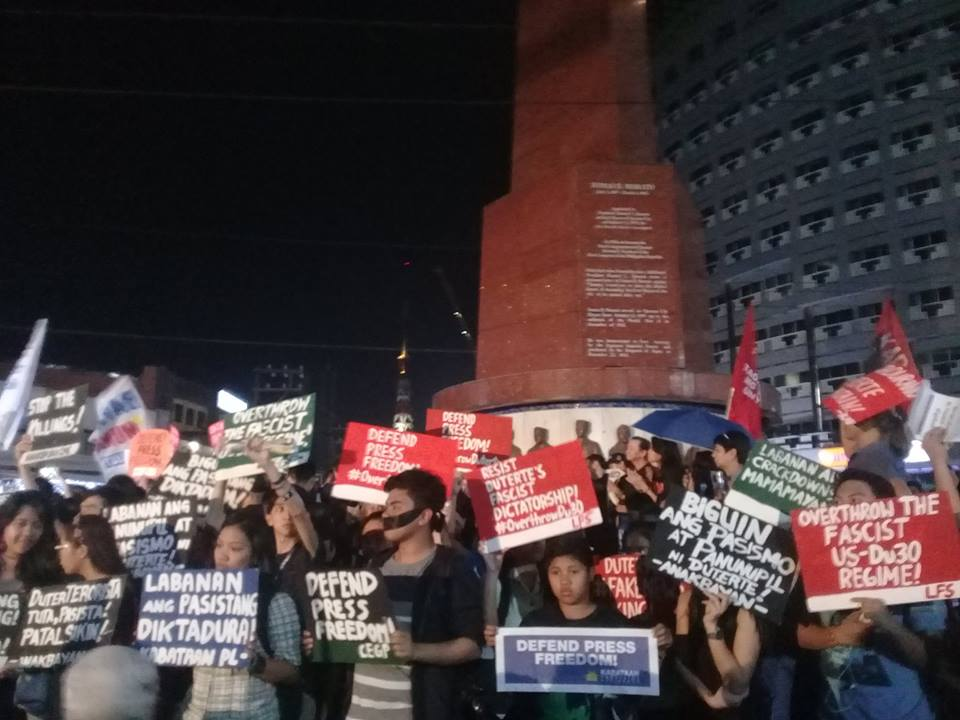
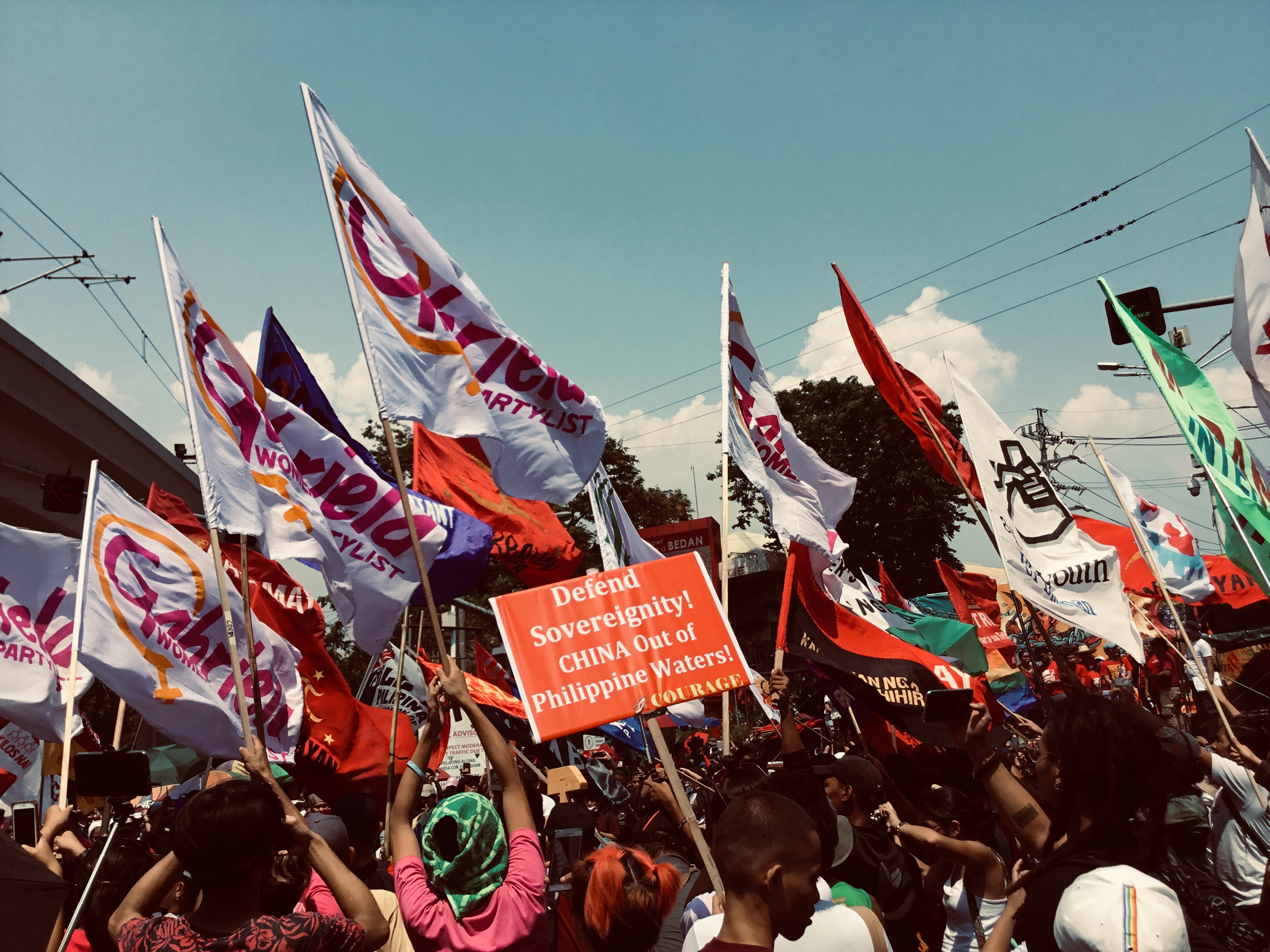
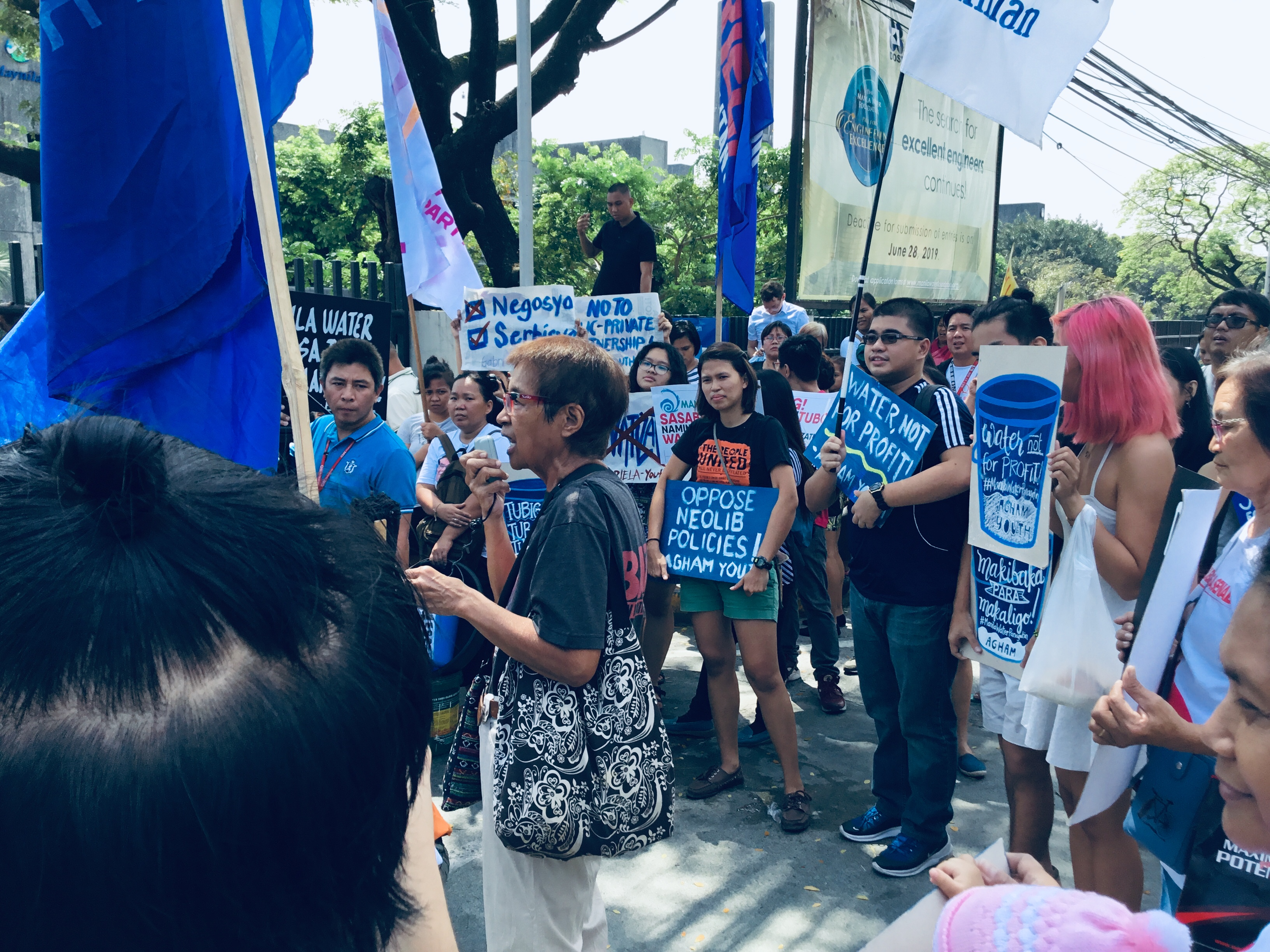
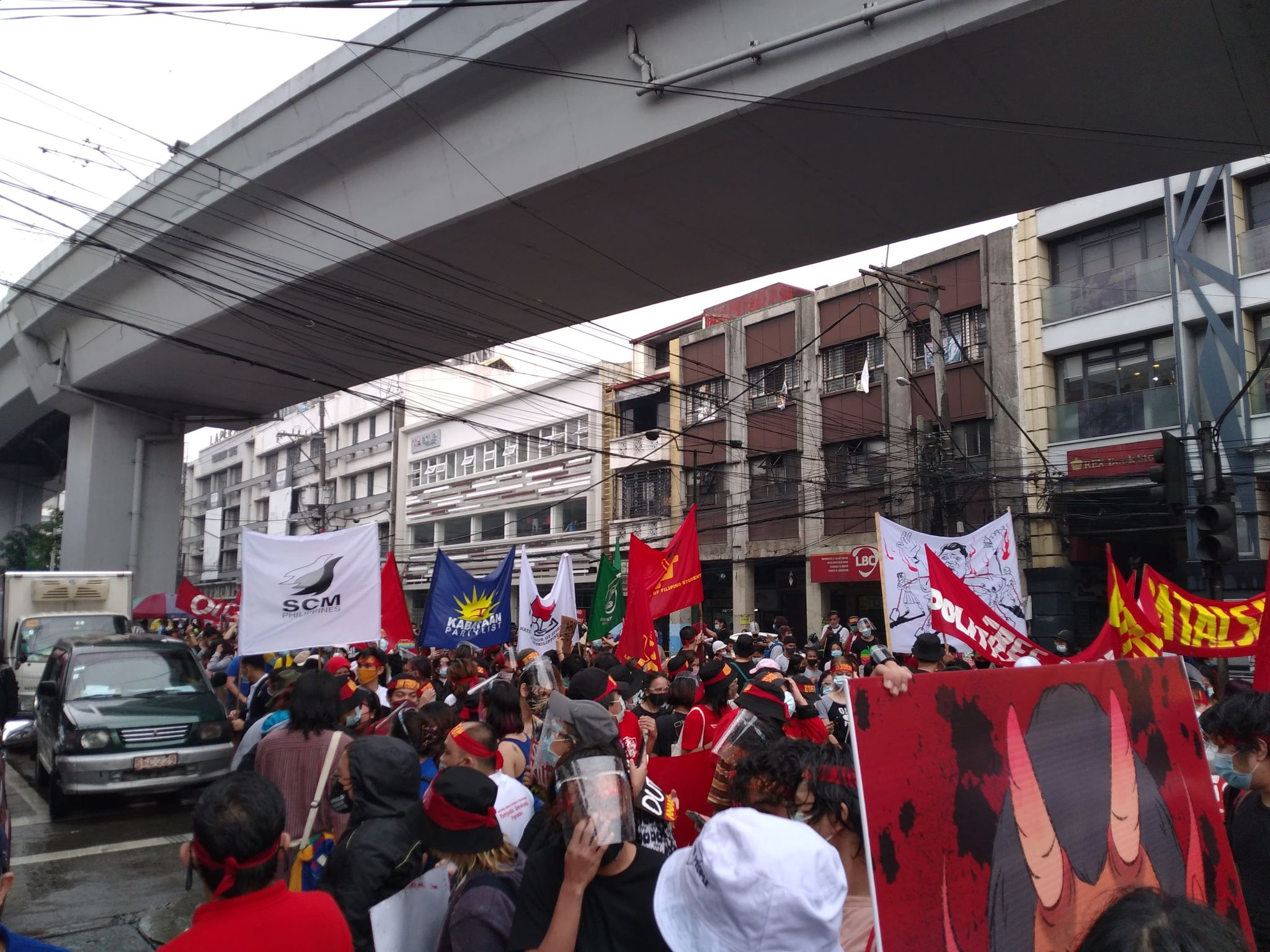
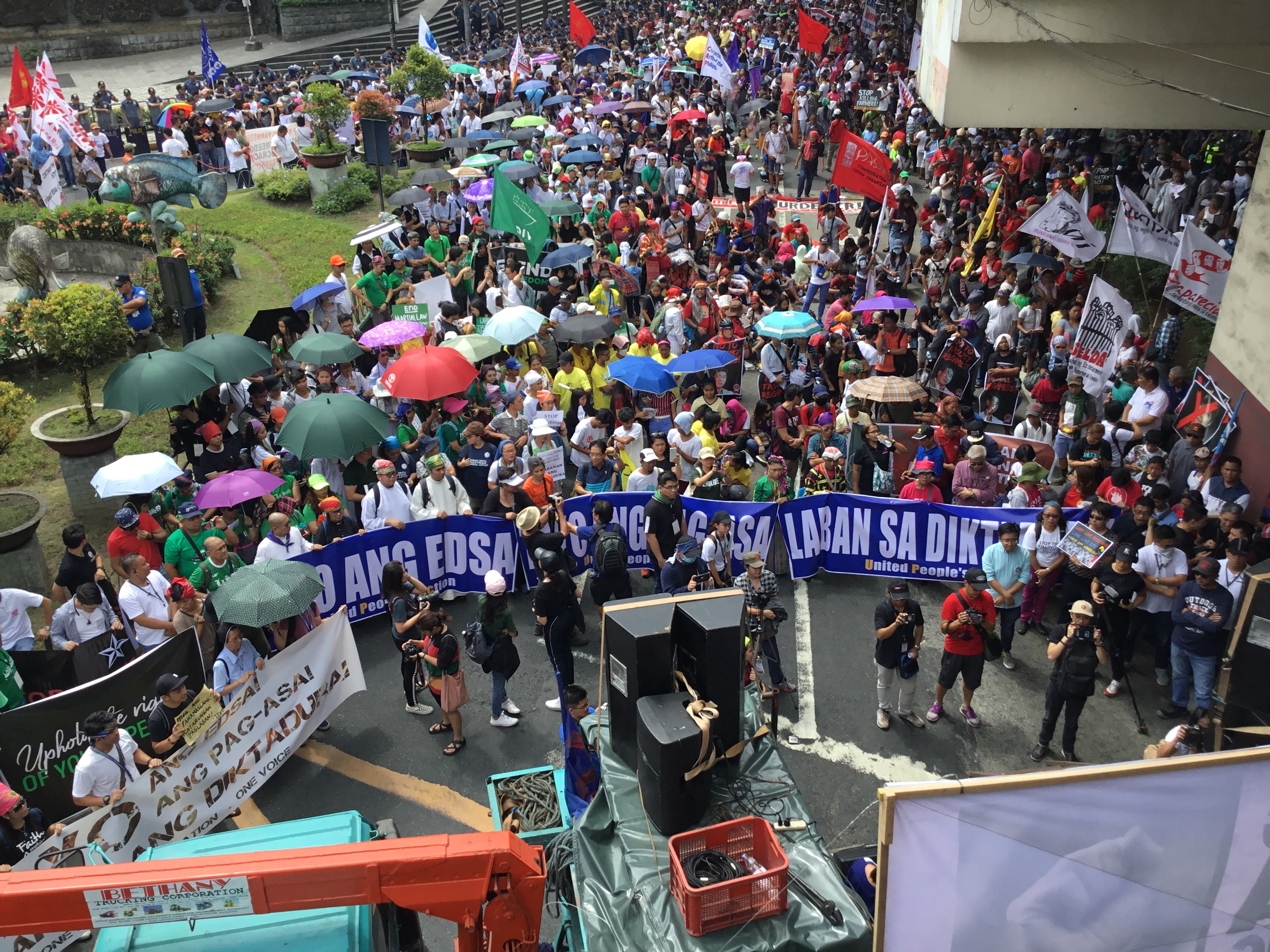
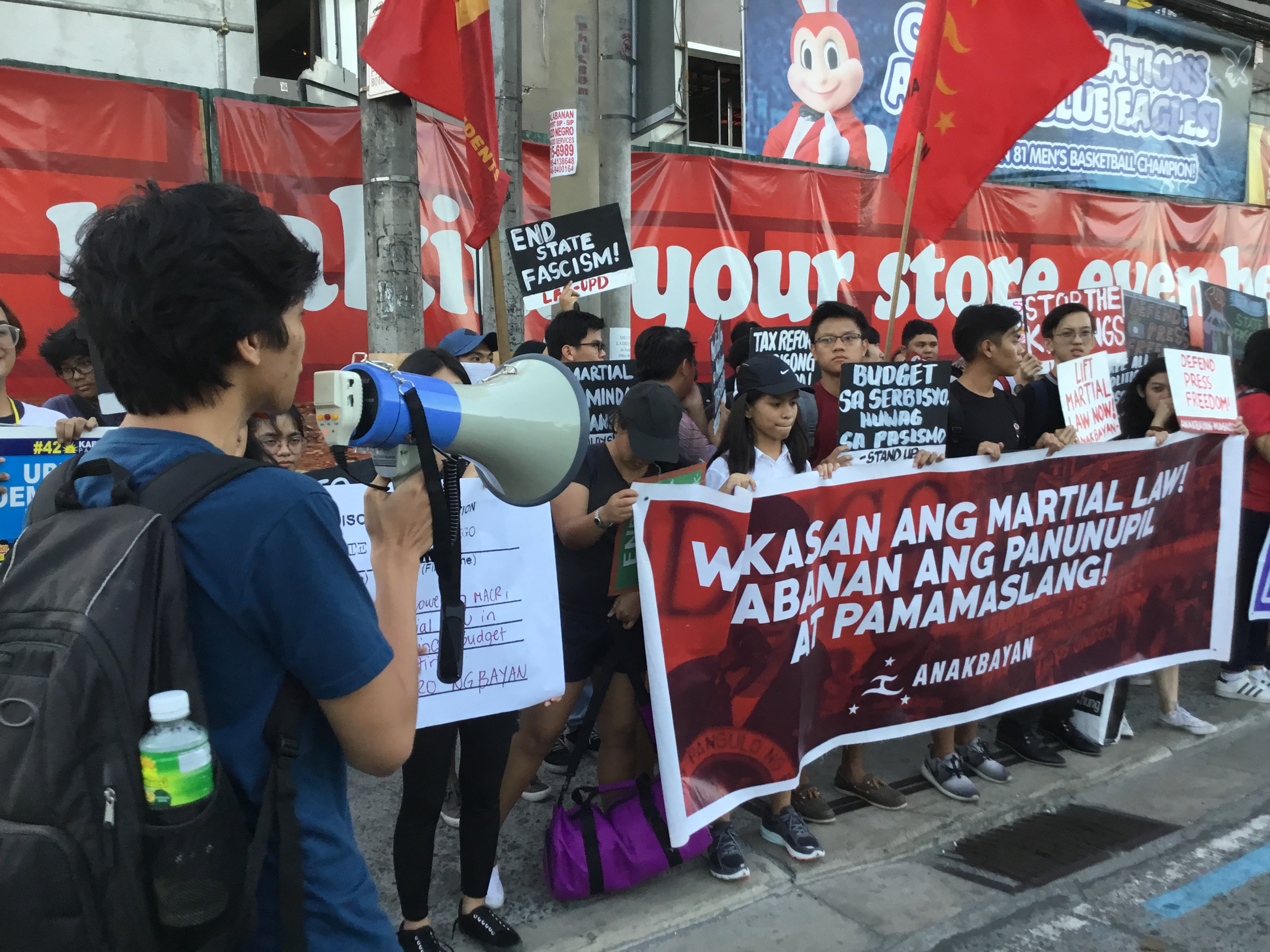
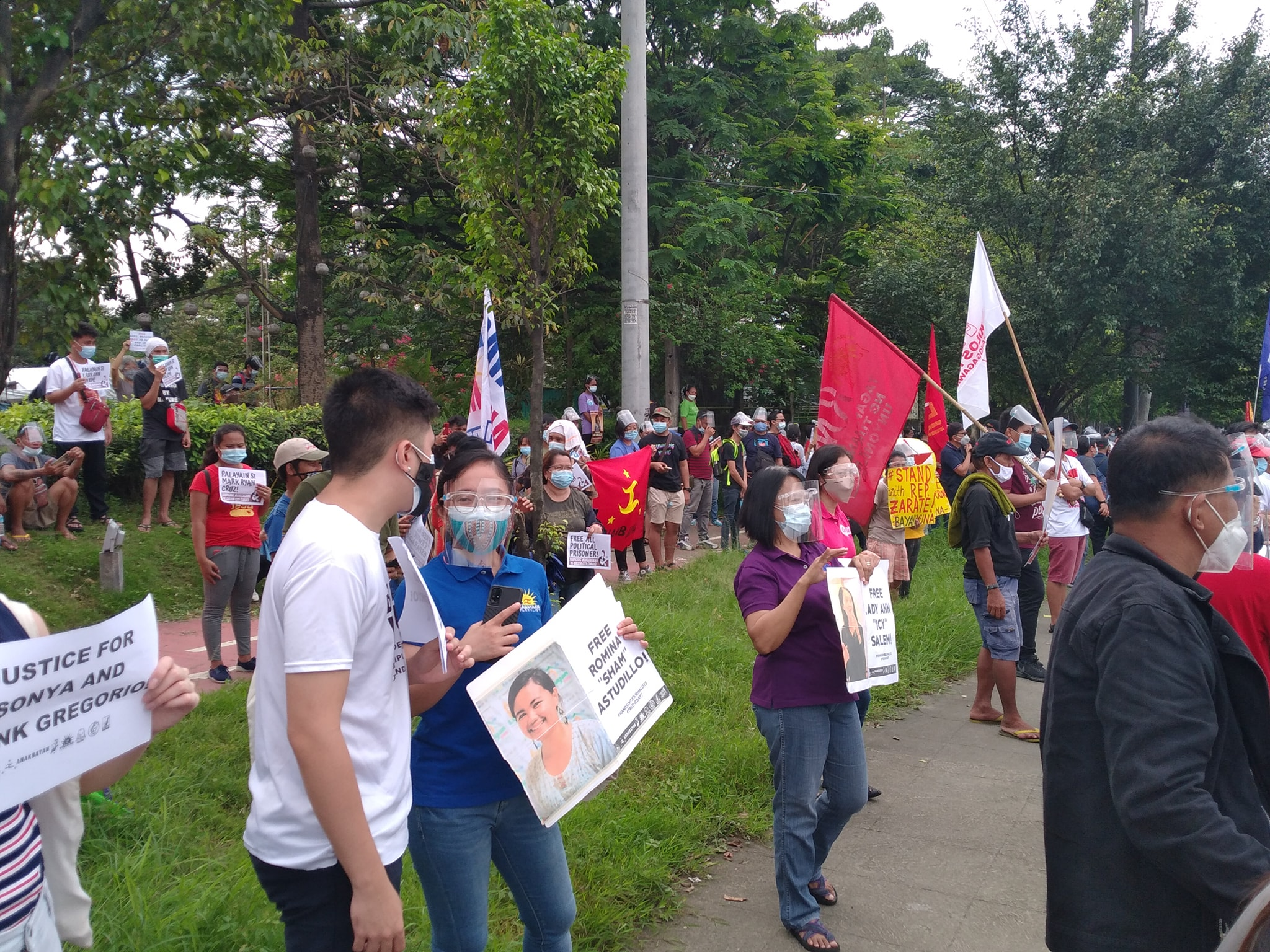
- Montage of demonstrations and protests against Rodrigo Duterte
- Date: November 18, 2016 – June 30, 2022 (Note: The first known protests occurred at the Philippine Consulate in New York City on October 11, 2016. November 18 is the beginning of massive protests in the Philippines, some directly aim to Duterte.) (5 years, 7 months and 12 days)
- Location: Philippines
- Caused by: Rodrigo Duterte's presidency and policies; War on drugs and associated extrajudicial killings
- Methods: Demonstrations, sit-ins, internet activism, vandalism, picketing, student walk-outs and strikes

Number
20,000-100,000 (organizers and media estimate); 7,000 (police estimate)	15,000 (2021 peak)

Injuries and arrests
- Injuries: 65+ (both sides) (Note: This total number were compiled from various news sources. See the Injuries and arrests section.)
- Arrested: 189+

Protests against Former President Rodrigo Duterte ran from 2016 through 2022. They initially escalated on November 18, 2016, following Duterte's support of the burial of the late president Ferdinand Marcos. The series of protests were mostly conducted by progressive groups and other opposition figures mainly due to the ongoing war on drugs, the declaration of martial law in Mindanao, and employment issues such as contractual terms being applied by companies and inflation due to the passage of the Tax Reform for Acceleration and Inclusion Law. Other causes of the protests included the government's response to the COVID-19 pandemic in the country, the passage of the Anti-Terrorism Act of 2020, and the shutdown and franchise denial of ABS-CBN.

== Causes of the protests ==
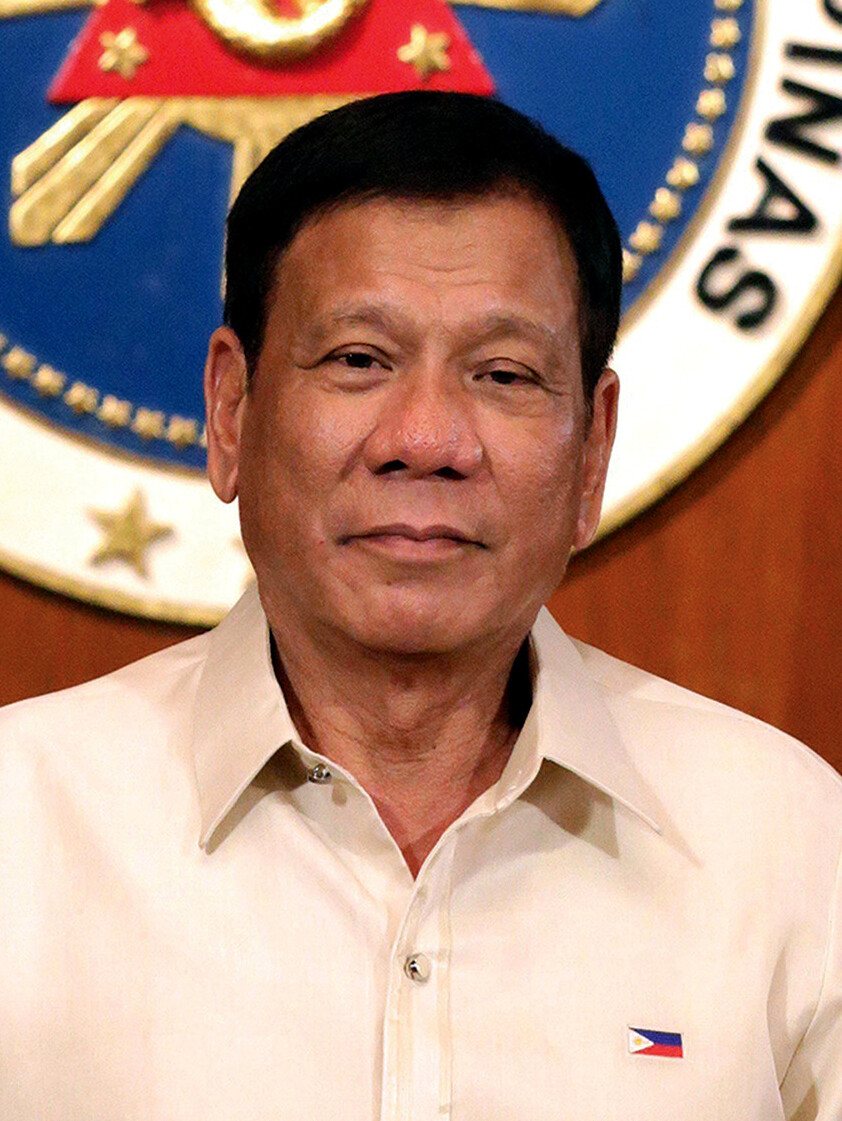
Rodrigo Duterte, the President of the Philippines (2016–2022)

=== War on drugs, extrajudicial killings, and other police-related controversies ===
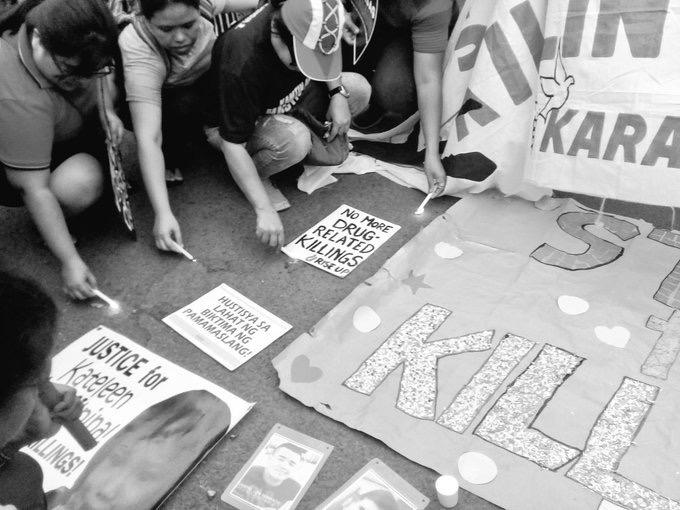
Relatives of drug war and alleged extrajudicial killings victims light the candles to remember the victims.

Duterte began the war against illegal drugs in the country the moment he began his presidency, promising to kill thousands of people involved in the drug trade. During the course of the drug war, more than 6,000 mostly petty drug users and suspects have been killed during police anti-drug operations. The killings have garnered attention from human rights groups, Western governments, and U.N. rights experts. Protests against the war on drugs, such as one done by Kadamay (Kadamay) in front of Camp Crame, have been conducted as early as August 2016. Despite the deaths in the campaign, Duterte's popularity in opinion polls remained high. In September 2016, the University of the Philippines Carillon Tower bells were played to mark the beginning of protests by various groups that included LGBT Bahaghari, UP Diliman Center for Women's and Gender Studies, the University Student Council, Stop the Killings Network, GABRIELA, Samahan ng mga Ex-Detainees Laban sa Detensyon at Aresto (SELDA), and Karapatan.

A coalition named "Manlaban sa EJK" (Manananggol Laban sa Extra Judicial Killings) was formed by lawyers, teachers, and law students in November 2017.

Aside from the war on drugs and extrajudicial killings, there have been forced disappearances under the Duterte administration. with at least 50 cases of enforced disappearance as of August 30, 2020. (Note: Various number of disappearances under Duterte administration differs; Karapatan reported 13 as of August 30, 2020 while human rights group Families of Victims of Involuntary Disappearance (FIND) reported 47 as of November 2, 2018.) Forced disappearances are commemorated every All Saints' Day by relatives – many of whom have been grieving since the Arroyo administration (as in the case of Sherlyn Cadapan and Karen Empeño in 2006). According to the Asian Federation Against Involuntary Disappearances (AFAD), there have been 1,993 cases of forced disappearances since Marcos regime.

The death toll from the war on drugs varies: officials claim that the number of those killed has reached 5,779, (Note: As of August 31, 2019.) but opposition leaders and human rights workers assert that more than 27,000 have been killed. (Note: As of December 2018.)

In March 2025, following the arrest of Rodrigo Duterte, Rise Up for Life and for Rights held a protest action in Manila and artist group Resbak held a gathering in Quezon City in support of families of victims of extrajudicial killings.

==== Killings of delos Santos, Arnaiz and de Guzman ====
The most notable case of youth casualties during the campaign is the killing of a 17-year-old student, Kian Loyd delos Santos, from Caloocan, on August 16, 2017, at the hands of the police. The incident sparked controversy among local politicians and militant groups and triggered massive protest in the country. Within two days, two more teenagers, Carl Angelo Arnaiz and Reynaldo de Guzman, were killed. Arnaiz, a 19-year-old teenager last found in Cainta, Rizal, was tortured and shot dead on August 17 by police after allegedly robbing a taxi in Caloocan. His 14-year-old friend, Reynaldo "Kulot" de Guzman was stabbed to death 30 times and thrown into a creek in Gapan, Nueva Ecija. Along with the deaths of Kian delos Santos, the deaths of the two teenagers also triggered public outrage and condemnation.

==== Death of River Nasino ====
River Nasino (July 1, 2020 – October 9, 2020) died in a Manila hospital after suffering from acute respiratory distress syndrome while her mother Reina Mae Nasino was detained for illegal possession of firearms and explosives. A 23-year-old human rights worker, Nasino and two other activists were arrested in Tondo, Manila, on November 5, 2019, and they were detained at the Manila City Jail for illegal possession of firearms and explosives, a non-bailable offense. After the court gave the detainee only six hours of furlough (three hours for the wake and another three hours for the burial) to allow her to visit her daughter's wake, a funeral for the baby River was laid on October 14, 2020, in Pandacan, Manila and she was buried on October 16, 2020, at Manila North Cemetery, with the police forces being deployed at the area. The baby's death sparked sympathy while the condemnation targeted towards the treatment of Reina Nasino during the baby's funeral and burial, ranging from activists to local celebrities. A simple protest was held on October 17, 2020, to condemn the circumstances of the mother-and-daughter.

==== Paniqui, Tarlac, shooting incident ====
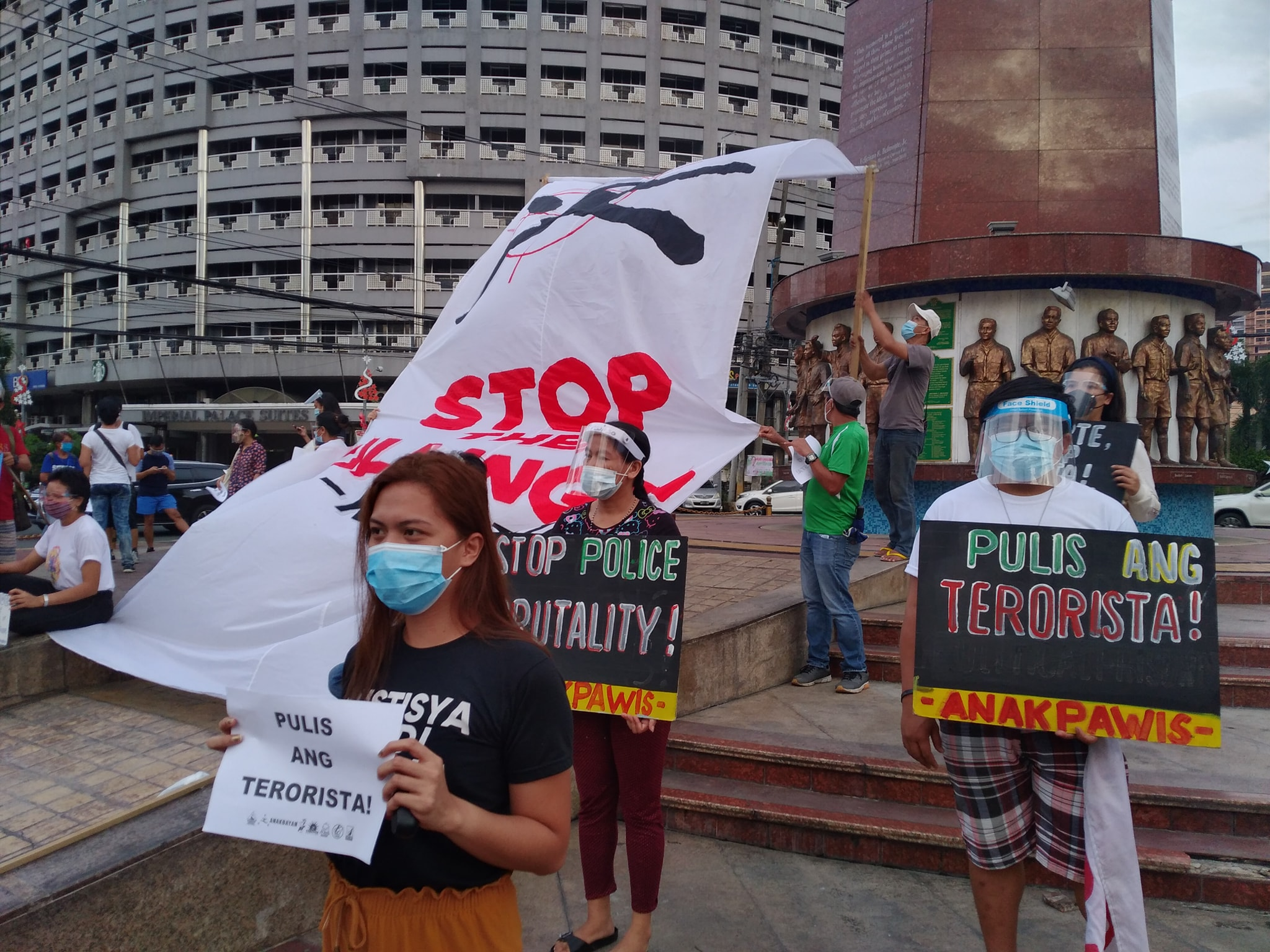
Indignation rally in response to Tarlac shooting incident, December 21, 2020, Boy Scout Circle, Quezon City.

Police Senior Master Sergeant Jonel Nuezca shot to death his two unarmed neighbors, Sonya Gregorio and her son Frank, in Paniqui, Tarlac, on December 20, 2020, at 5:10 pm (PST). The incident was reported to the police 20 minutes later and, at 6:19 pm, Nuezca surrendered at the police station in Pangasinan.

The incident started when Nuezca went to investigate the Gregorios who were shooting a boga–an improvised bamboo cannon used as a noisemaker every December. Nuezca tried to arrest Frank, who appeared to be drunk. This led to a heated argument with Sonya, which culminated in Nuezca killing the two by shooting them at close range. According to Police Colonel Renante Cabico, director of the Tarlac Provincial Police Office, Nuezca was "off duty" at the time of the incident. The police called the incident an "isolated case."

The incident was captured on video and spread online. Several netizens and celebrities condemned the killings on social media with the hashtags #StopTheKillingsPH, #EndPoliceBrutality, #PulisAngTerorista, and #JusticeForSonyaGregorio dominating on Twitter in the Philippines, as well as in Singapore and Dubai. Some critics also pointed at the government over the acts of impunity and human rights abuses in recent years.

An indignation rally was done by numerous groups on December 21, 2020, at the Boy Scout Circle, Quezon City.

==== Lumad killings and attacks on Lumad schools ====
Lumad communities contend with extrajudicial killings and red-tagging. Defenders of Indigenous land rights, environmentalists, and human rights activists have also been harassed. Lumad students joined protests at Duterte's 2017 State of the Nation Address to condemn attacks on Lumad schools and the military occupation of their communities. Demonstrations were also held to protest the killing of Mindanao indigenous people, the killing of Lumad school teacher Chad Booc, and martial law in Mindanao.

=== Burial of Ferdinand Marcos ===
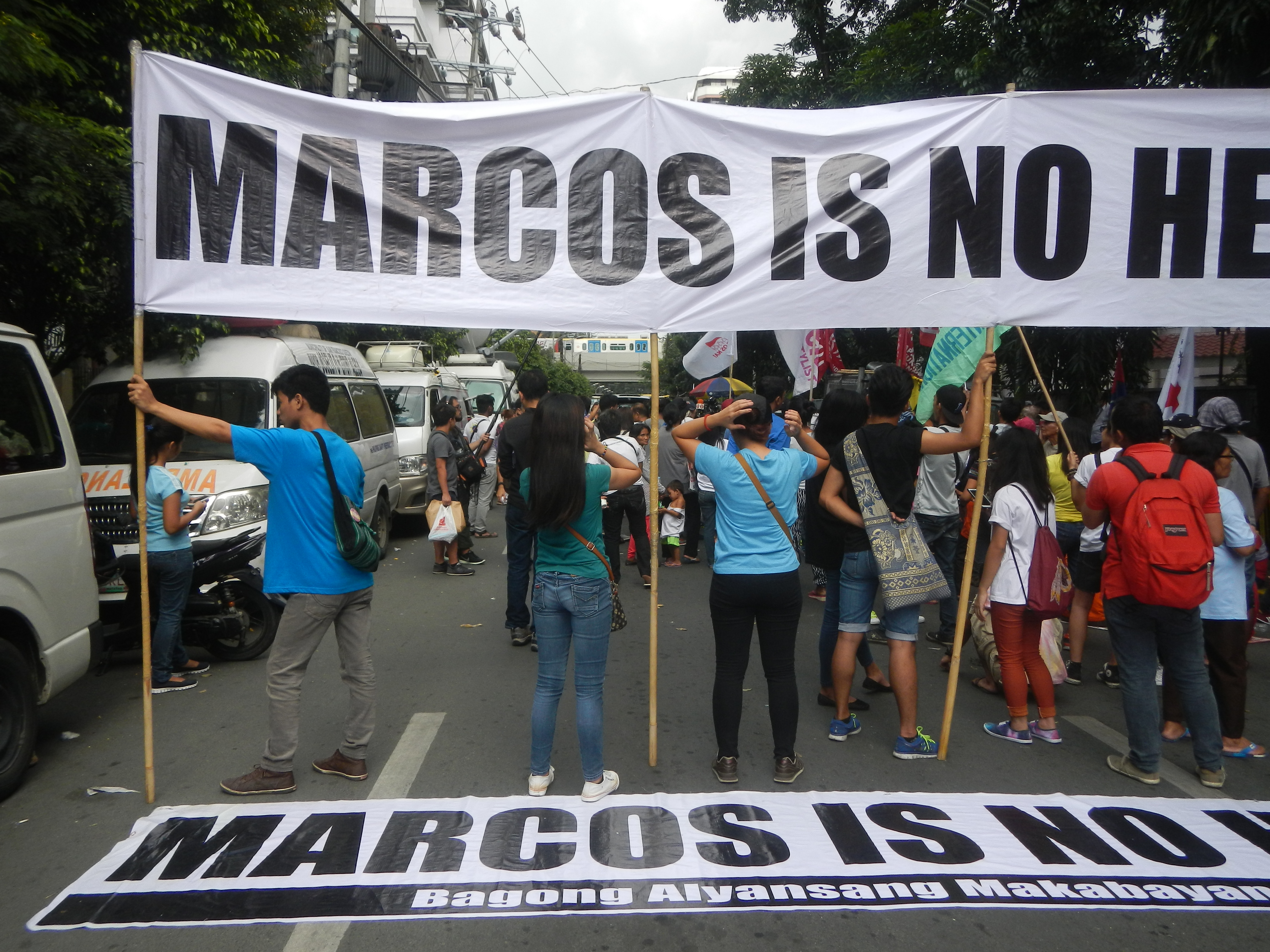
Protesters opposing the burial of Marcos.

During his 2016 presidential campaign, Duterte supported the burial of late President Ferdinand Marcos at the Libingan ng mga Bayani in Taguig. On November 8, 2016, the Supreme Court permitted Marcos' burial in a 9–5–1 vote. Marcos was buried at the Libingan ng mga Bayani on November 18.

=== Phasing out of jeepneys ===
Jeepney drivers staged a series of protest and strike actions nationwide to oppose the government's plan to phase out old and dilapidated jeepneys. On October 18, 2017, Duterte taunted the protesting drivers, daring them to quit and "suffer in poverty and hunger" if they cannot modernize their old jeepneys. However, Land Transportation Franchising and Regulatory Board (LTFRB) chair Martin Delgra explained the next day that Duterte's call was only his "expression of urgency." Its proposal of jeepney modernization will affect 240,000 jeepneys and 80,000 UV Express.

In January 2018, the Inter-Agency Council for Traffic (I-ACT) began apprehending dilapidated and smoke-belching jeepneys in an operation called "Tanggal Usok, Tanggal Bulok". This made getting a ride home difficult for commuters, especially students. Commuters expressed on social media their frustration getting stranded due to the apprehension of jeepneys.

The total phaseout of jeepneys was set to be implemented on July 1, 2020, only to be extended to December 31, 2020, due to the COVID-19 pandemic, and further extended to March 31, 2021. The LTFRB stated that jeepney operators who had failed to consolidate their fleets for the modernization program by the March 2021 deadline will be allowed to temporarily operate under a provisional authority for 1 year.

=== Declaration of martial law in Mindanao and the subsequent extension ===
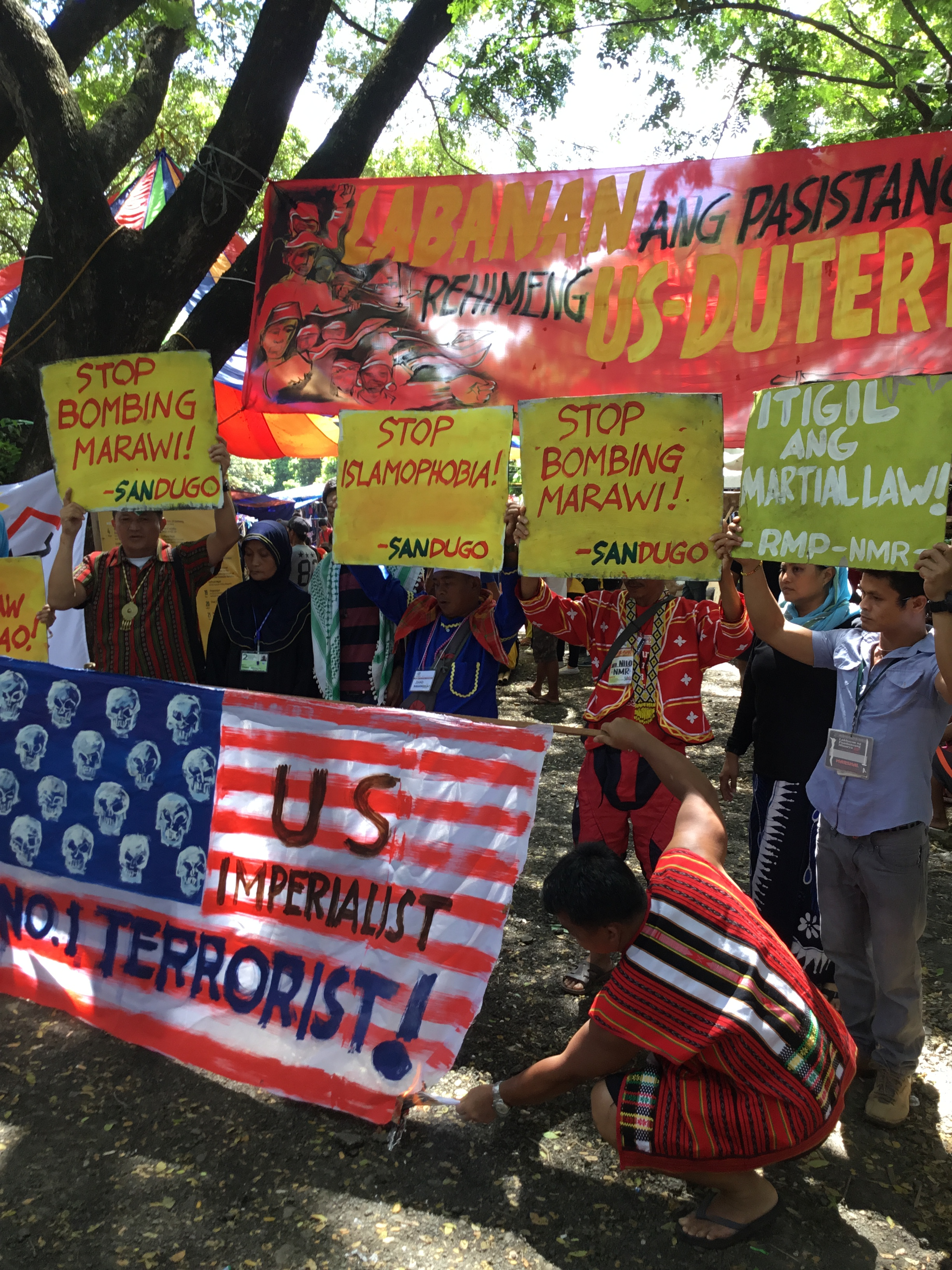
Anti-martial law, anti-imperialist calls by indigenous peoples and Moro people during the Lakbayan 2017

Duterte declared martial law in the whole Mindanao on May 23, 2017, following the crisis in Marawi between Philippine government security forces and militants affiliated with the Islamic State of Iraq and the Levant (ISIL), including the Maute and Abu Sayyaf Salafi jihadist groups. Martial law was extended three times.

=== Proposed revolutionary government ===
In October 2017, Duterte said that he would declare a revolutionary government against the supposed conspirator of destabilizing the government made by the communist rebels, Liberals and other factions. He said to the media that "'Pag ang (if the) destablization ninyo patagilid na at medyo magulo na (would be shaky and more trouble), I will not hesitate to declare a revolutionary government until the end of my term." The next month, he clarified that he would only declare a revolutionary government if "things go out of control." Should the revolutionary government declared, "he would order the security forces to arrest all destabilizers and go on a full-scale war against communist rebels."

On the last week of August 2020, several Duterte supporters revived the calls for revolutionary government amid the rising cases of COVID-19 pandemic in the country. President Duterte himself denied the involvement of pushing the revolutionary government.

=== Planned revocation of Rappler ===
On January 11, 2018, the Securities and Exchange Commission of the Philippines (SEC) revoked Rappler's certificate of incorporation over Rappler's use of Philippine Depository Receipts (PDRs). It said that the provisions of the PDR issued to Omidyar Network by Rappler gave the American investment firm control over the local media firms' other PDR holders as well as its corporate policies, which the SEC says is a violation of the Constitution's provisions on foreign ownership and control. Rappler claimed that it was 100% Filipino owned and that Omidyar only invests in the media firm. Despite the certificate revocation, SEC stated that Rappler could still operate since their decision was not final, pointing out that the media firm could also challenge the decision before the Court of Appeals within 15 days. Malacañang Palace also suggested that Rappler authors can still continue to publish on their website as bloggers. On February 28, Omidyar Network donated its Rappler PDRs to the editors and executives of Rappler.

On February 13, 2019, Rappler CEO Maria Ressa was arrested by National Bureau Investigation (NBI) for cyber libel upon the orders of the Manila Regional Trial Court Branch 46, "alleged that her right to due process was violated." Ressa is known for her criticism against Duterte's war on drugs. The arrest of Ressa sparked condemnations from the international journalists and local groups, who slammed the Duterte administration by saying that the action is "clearly part of the administration's attack on press freedom." Duterte denied his involvement of her arrest.

=== Tax Reform for Acceleration and Inclusion Law (TRAIN law) and the subsequent inflation ===
Duterte signed the Tax Reform for Acceleration and Inclusion Law, also known as TRAIN law, on December 19, 2017, that lowers personal income taxes while increases the price of fuel, cars, coal and sugar-sweetened drinks. In the first half of 2018, several groups staged the protests against TRAIN LAW, which the group blamed it for increasing basic goods and oil prices. TRAIN law also had the impact to the store owners due to increasing prices. On May 24, 2018, a coalition called "Stop Train Coalition" launched the signature that needed at least a million signatures to junk the TRAIN law.

=== Charter Change ===
Constitutional reform in the Philippines, also known as Charter Change (colloquially Cha-Cha), refers to the political and legal processes needed to amend the current 1987 Constitution of the Philippines. Under the common interpretation of the Constitution, amendments can be proposed by one of three methods: a People's Initiative, a Constituent Assembly or a Constitutional Convention.

Efforts to attempt to amend the 1987 Constitution have been done since the administrations of Ramos, Estrada, and Arroyo. The Duterte administration made similar attempts in early 2018 but the proposed charter bill failed to pass in the Senate. In early January 2021, the discussion about charter change was revived.

=== Employment issues ===
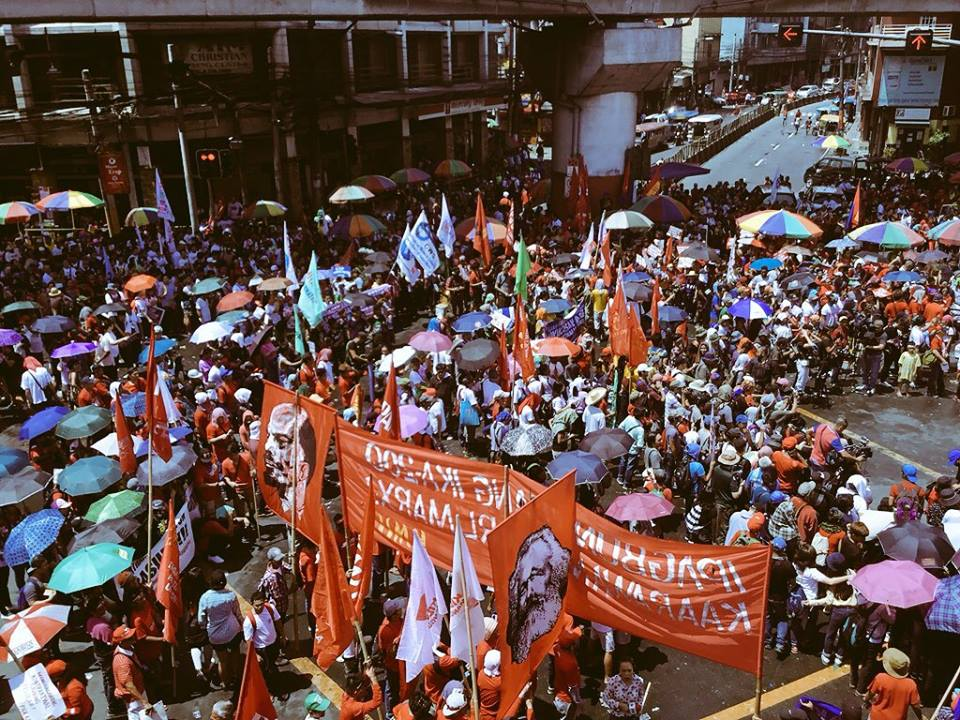
Labor Day 2018 mobilization

Several militant groups have mainly concerned over the contractualization being applied to the workers in the country. Contractualization defines "a practice where a company hires contractual workers only when is necessary" while "endo" (end of contract) "refers to the scheme that corrupt companies exercise to abuse their workers." The above-mentioned was heavily opposed by the labor groups as they urged Duterte to sign executive order (EO) that will regulate contractualization. According to Presidential Spokesperson Harry Roque, the EO will be possibly signed on May 1, Labor Day. However, on April 19, Labor Secretary Silvestre Bello III confirmed that there will be no longer an executive order, and, instead, the Congress will be the one to pass it.

=== Removal of Sereno by the Supreme Court ===
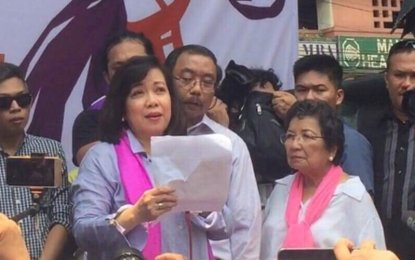
Ousted Chief Justice Maria Lourdes Sereno (left) addresses her crowd of supporters after her peers in the Supreme Court voted to oust her based on the solicitor general's quo warranto petition on May 11, 2018

Demonstrations staged by the supporters of Supreme Court Chief Justice Maria Lourdes Sereno occurred, following her impeachment process filed against her and her subsequent indefinite leave. The main reasons for the impeachment proceedings, according to the complainant, lawyer Larry Gadon, was that Sereno allegedly failed to declare her Statement of Assets, Liabilities and Net worth (SALN) and was also responsible for tax misdeclarations and unauthorized expenses.

=== Shootings of Marcelito Paez, Mark Ventura, and Richmond Nilo ===
On December 4, 2017, Marcelito Paez was killed by unidentified assailant while driving his Toyota Innova in Jaen-Zaragoza Road in Jaen, Nueva Ecija. Human rights organization Karapatan condemned the killing of Paez. Before his death, Paez helped for the release of the political prisoner Rommel Tucay, who was detained in Cagayan jail.

On April 29, 2018, a 37-year-old priest Mark Ventura was shot dead by riding-in-tandem assailants after saying Sunday mass in Gattaran, Cagayan. Authorities said that Ventura was blessing the children and talking to the choir members when the assailants shot him. The CBCP, Senator Kiko Pangilinan, and Anakbayan condemned the murder of Ventura, with Anakbayan calling it "fascistic, tyrannical, and mafia-style rule" by the Duterte administration. On May 1, Manila Archbishop Luis Antonio Tagle denounced the killing, saying in Tagalog, "Isn't he a gift from God? Is it that easy now to kill and throw a person away?" On May 3, the Ventura's family and the Cagayan Valley police announced a P300,000 reward for information on the suspected killers.

On June 10, a priest, Richmond Nilo of the Diocese of Cabanatuan, was gunned down by unknown assailants as he was preparing for evening mass at a small chapel in Zaragoza, Nueva Ecija on June 10, 2018, at 6:05 pm. Following the murder, the Philippine National Police said that they tagged at least five suspects in connection with the killing of Nilo. One of the suspects linked to the murder, Adell Roll Milan—an altar boy at the church, was arrested by the police on June 14. PNP chief Oscar Albayalde identified him as a resident of Barangy Malapit, San Isidro, Nueva Ecija. The police retrieved surveillance cameras; one showing the two men riding in the motorcycle in a road near the chapel moments before the crime, and another one showing a third suspect who served as lookout while two others were seen in a getaway vehicle. Another CCTV footage, timestamped 5:09 pm, shows Milan is seen riding his motorcycle outside T. Ador Dionisio National High School, roughly 25 kilometres (16 miles) from the church. However, Elena Matias, grandmother of Milan, during the interview with Rappler, said that the police (wearing only civilian clothes) wrongly arrested him as they did not introduce themselves, and did not present any warrant of arrest. The distance between Milan's house and the small chapel is just at least 25 kilometers away. Matias also said that neither she nor her grandson had knowledge of the killing.

Larry Gadon, Milan's lawyer, believes that he is a fall guy. Milan's childhood friend, Nelson John Oreo, claimed that he was with Milan 4:00 to 8:30 p.m. on the day when the priest was killed.

Several members from religious sectors, such as CBCP, and opposition politicians, have directly pointed the finger at Duterte, who is known for his attacks against the church—whom are critical of the administration.

Another alleged perpetrator of Nilo's murder identified as Omar Mallari, who was arrested by the police on July 2. According to the police, they traced Mallari's whereabouts using the plate number of vehicle which was caught in a CCTV footage when Nilo was killed. Aside from Mallari, they also apprehended the suspect Manuel Torres, while two other suspects, Rolando Garcia and Marius Albis Torres, surrendered. However, some of the suspects remain at large. The police said that, in their affidavits, Mallari and Garcia said that they were paid by Torres a P100,000 to kill the priest. On October 5, another suspect named Bernie Limpio, 36, was arrested during the nighttime buy-bust operation in Maddela, Quirino. During the investigation by the police, they found out that Limpio has an arrest warrant for the Nilo case.

=== Oplan Tambay ===
In mid-June 2018, Duterte launched the Oplan Tambay campaign against loiterers (Tagalog: tambays) who violate city ordinances against smoking in public places, drinking liquor on the streets, and going shirtless in public. Within the first week of the campaign, at least 8,000 residents had either been accosted or apprehended for violating the rules. By July 29, 2018, the police had arrested 78,359 loiterers in Metro Manila alone.

However, this campaign stirred controversy, notably the case of Genesis "Tisoy" Argoncillo who was allegedly killed by fellow detainees inside the Novaliches Police Station on June 19 after spending 4-days in the detention.

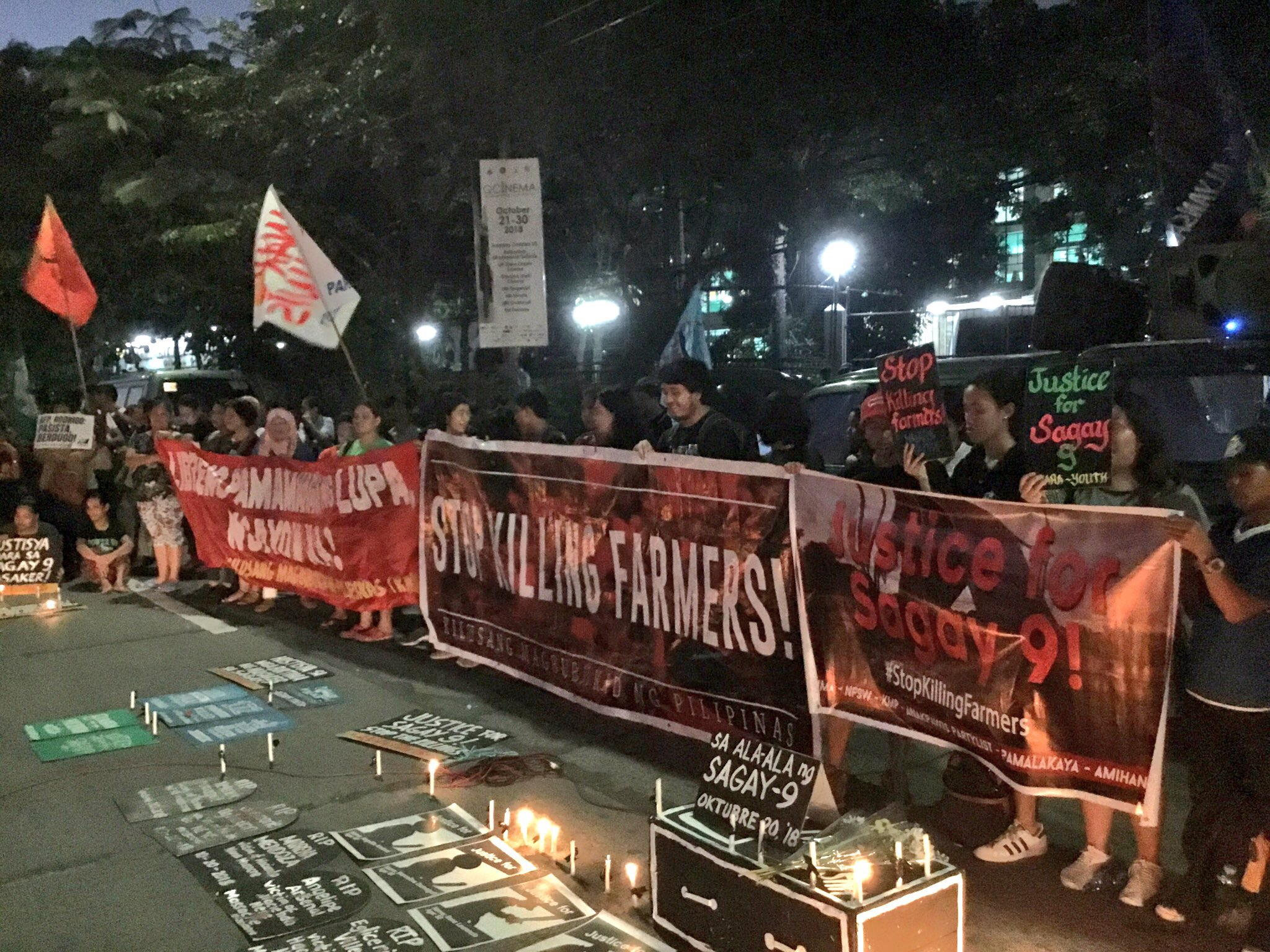
Protesters rallied against peasant killings under Duterte, including the Sagay massacre

=== Peasants and activists death/killing ===
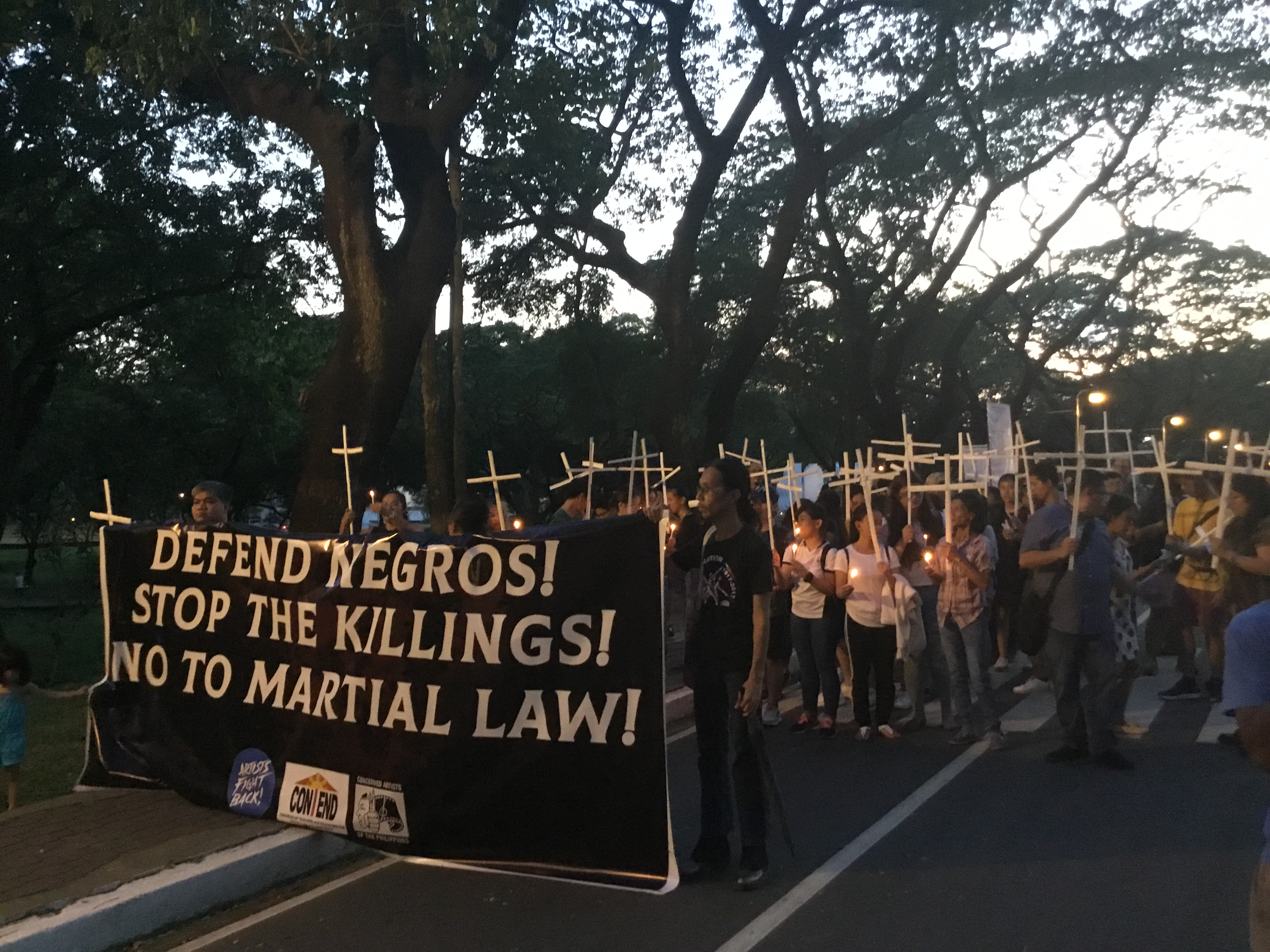
August 16, 2019 protest inside UP Diliman against Negros massacres.

Farmer protesters are among of the opposition figures due to their claim that the military has allegedly killed farmers under the Duterte administration. According to peasant group Unyon ng Manggagawa sa Agrikultura, 213 farmers have been killed under the Duterte regime as of July 2019. The killing of farmers gained national attention when, on October 20, 2018, armed gunmen killed nine farmers inside the sugarcane plantation in Sagay, Negros Occidental. Initially, the police stated that the New People's Army may be "behind" the massacre. However, opposition groups said that the Duterte administration and the military "should be held responsible" for the killings, and another group also condemned Duterte for the killings.

Farmers and other groups protested the continued killing of farmers under Duterte on the anniversary of the 1987 Mendiola massacre that occurred during the Corazon Aquino administration.

The Human Rights Watch recorded at least 13 activists who have been killed since Duterte became president as of August 17, 2020. Notable activists who were killed or have died during the Duterte administration include Joseph Canlas – who was arrested on March 30, 2021, for allegedly possessing illegal firearms and explosives and subsequently died from COVID-19 complications on May 11, 2021, the 3-month old daughter of Reina Mae Nasino on October 10, 2020, Randy Echanis – who was tortured and killed inside his home in Quezon City on August 10, 2020, Zara Alvarez – who was killed in Bacolod on August 17, 2020, Jevilyn Cullamat (daughter of Bayan Muna Representative Eufemia Cullamat), and the nine activists killed during what was called the "Bloody Sunday" police raids on March 7, 2021, in Calabarzon.

=== Lowering of the age of criminal responsibility ===
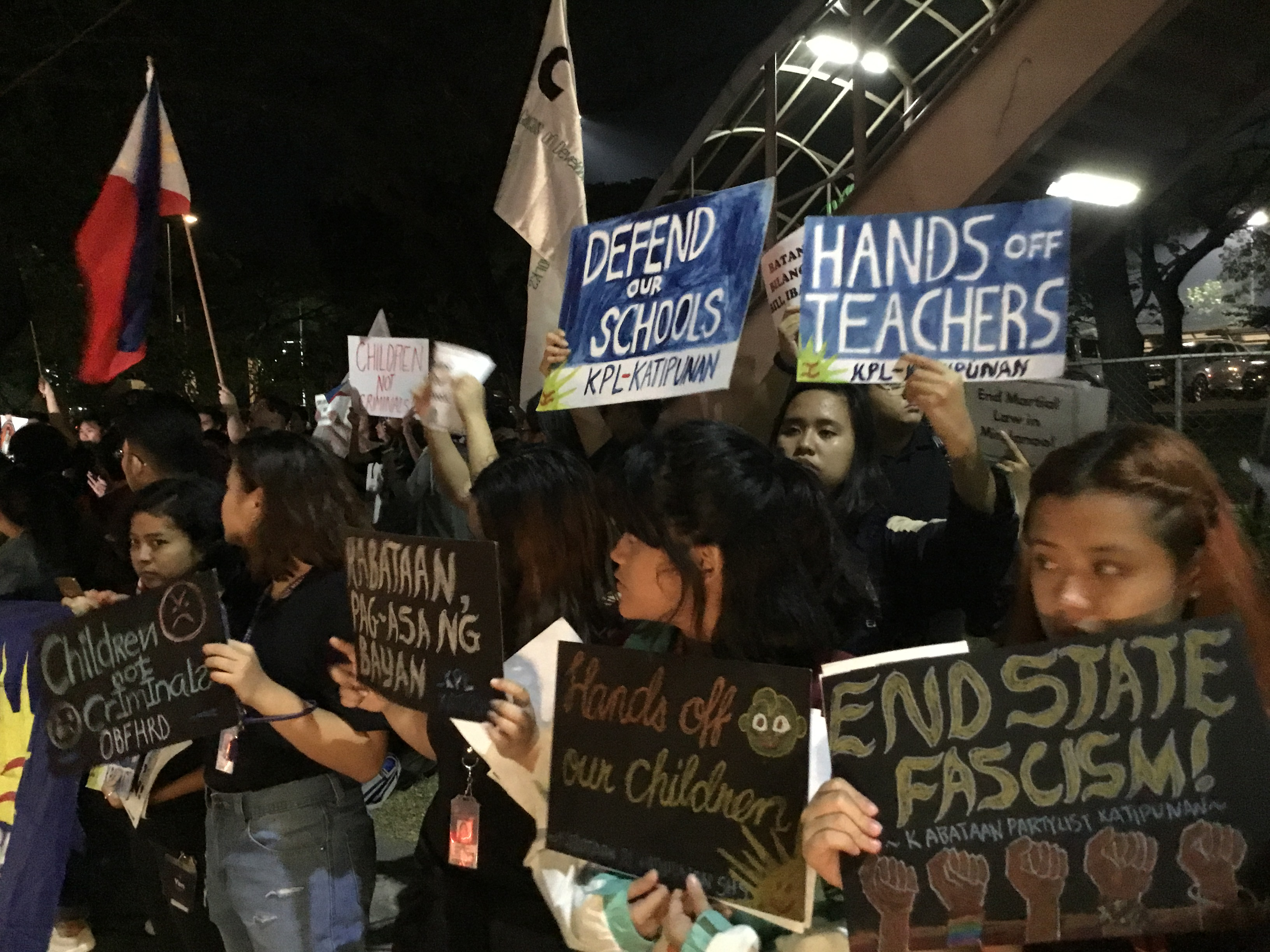
Students from Ateneo de Manila University protested against the lowering of the minimum age of criminal responsibility

On January 21, 2019, the House committee bill was issued, stating that the age of criminal responsibility will be lowered from 15 to nine years of age. However, it was opposed by some advocates including UNICEF and Save the Children, local politicians, artists, and celebrities who used the hashtag #ChildrenNotCriminals as the condemnation. Prior to this, it had been planned by congressmen, which was then echoed by President Duterte, to lower the age of criminal responsibility in 2016.

=== Government action to the South China Sea territorial disputes ===
The incident at the Reed Bank occurred on June 9, 2019, when a Chinese vessel rammed the Philippine fishing boat, F/B Gem-Ver, which carried 22 fishermen, causing the latter to sink. All of the fishermen were rescued by the Philippine Navy. Several days after incident, Duterte was kept silent about the incident until June 17 when he eventually made a statement, saying that the incident was just the "maritime incident." Because of this, it generated public controversy and several militant groups including the fishermen's relatives have desired to impeach Duterte for allowing "China to fish in the Exclusive Economic Zone (EEZ) in the West Philippine Sea."

In April 2021, the discussions over the issue on South China Sea dispute were revived. Initially, on his 2016 presidential campaign, Duterte vows to "ride a jetski" and "plant" the Philippine flag at the airport built by China in the Spratlys" but in 2017, Duterte said that he would no longer plant the Philippine flag in the Spratly out of respect for China. In July 2016, after Duterte was elected, an arbitral tribunal ruled in The Hague, Netherlands that China's claim to almost the entire South China Sea, of which the West Philippine Sea is part of, was unfounded. On May 9, 2021, Duterte revealed that he was only joking and called those who believed in it "stupid." This triggered criticism from the fishermen and on Twitter, trending the hashtag #DuterteDuwag (#DuterteCoward). The issue was criticized throughout by retired Supreme Court Senior Associate Justice Antonio Carpio. Senator Manny Pacquiao also joined to criticize Duterte personally, stating that the latter must fulfill his promise to "ride a jetski" and flag the country's flag there.

=== Good conduct time allowance controversy ===
In August 2019, the news reports of impending release of former Calauan, Laguna mayor Antonio Sanchez, who was the prime suspect of murders of Eileen Sarmenta and Allan Gomez in 1993 and was convicted in March 1995, was met by outrage across the country. After weeks of controversy, the Duterte administration denied the role in releasing of Sanchez and ordered Justice Secretary Menardo Guevarra and Bureau of Corrections chief Nicanor Faeldon not to release him. Sanchez remained in prison until his death on March 27, 2021.

The GCTA controversy sparked again in September 2020 when Duterte granted an absolute pardon to Joseph Scott Pemberton, which was justified by his spokesman Harry Roque, who was once a legal counsel for the Laude family. Pemberton killed trans woman Jennifer Laude inside the Olongapo motel in October 2014. On December 1, 2015, Pemberton was convicted of murder, sentenced him to 6 to 12 years in jail. The pardon, which was condemned by the Laude family, sparked outrage in the LGBT community, as well as high-profile personalities from senators to celebrities. The hashtag #JusticeForJenniferLaude landed on the top trending spot in social media, where majority of the posts were critical of Duterte. On September 11, 2020, several LGBT communities held a rally to protest Duterte's absolute of pardon of Joseph Scott Pemberton.

=== Government response to the COVID-19 pandemic in the Philippines ===
Amid the COVID-19 pandemic, the first case of SARS-CoV-2 infection in the Philippines was confirmed on 30 January. The patient was a 38-year-old Chinese woman from Wuhan, who had arrived in Manila from Hong Kong on 21 January. This triggered social media outrage. The hashtag #OustDuterte trended on Twitter, where some groups blamed the government for "criminal negligence" for the entry of SARS-CoV-2 in the country and the "lack of action" to prevent the coronavirus from spreading.

The government's handling of the COVID-19 pandemic was criticized on social media platforms, especially on Twitter: for instance, the NBI's attempt to investigate Pasig Mayor Vico Sotto for allegedly violating the quarantine policy, the arrest in Quezon City on April 1, 2020, of 20 protesters looking for aid from the local government, Duterte's remarks of ordering to "shoot" the person who violated the quarantine protocols on April 2, 2020, the shooting of Philippine Army veteran Winston Ragos by the police at a checkpoint on April 21, 2020, and the controversial birthday party of National Capital Region Police Office Regional Director Maj. Gen. Debold Sinas on May 8, 2020, despite the enhanced community quarantine (ECQ) being implemented at the time. The delay in the arrival in the Philippines of vaccines has also been condemned.

=== ABS-CBN franchise renewal controversy, shutdown and franchise denial ===
The shutdown of ABS-CBN, the Philippines' largest and leading television network, was met with massive criticism and outcry among local celebrities and television viewers, as well as politicians and militant groups. The franchise controversy mainly focuses on the disputes between the Duterte administration and ABS-CBN, which Duterte has criticized for their "alleged biased and unfavorable news coverage" against Duterte, beginning with his presidential campaign in the 2016 Philippine presidential election. Duterte voiced his opposition to the network's renewal of congressional franchise, stating that "I will see to it that you're out." After the National Telecommunications Commission (NTC) and Solicitor General Jose Calida issued a cease and desist order against ABS-CBN, the network effectively ceased broadcasting on May 5, 2020.

Congressional hearings for the new franchise began on May 26, 2020. On June 30, the NTC and Calida issued two alias cease and desist orders (ACDO) demanding ABS-CBN TV Plus (and all of its digital channels like Yey! and Asianovela Channel) and Sky Direct to immediately cease all of its operations. On July 10, members of the House of Representatives, particularly the Committee on Legislative Franchises, voted 70–11 to reject the franchise application of ABS-CBN citing political reasons and several issues on the network's franchise. In response, supporters, employees, and personalities of ABS-CBN held a noise barrage in solidarity with the network since July 13, 2020.

=== Anti-Terrorism Act ===
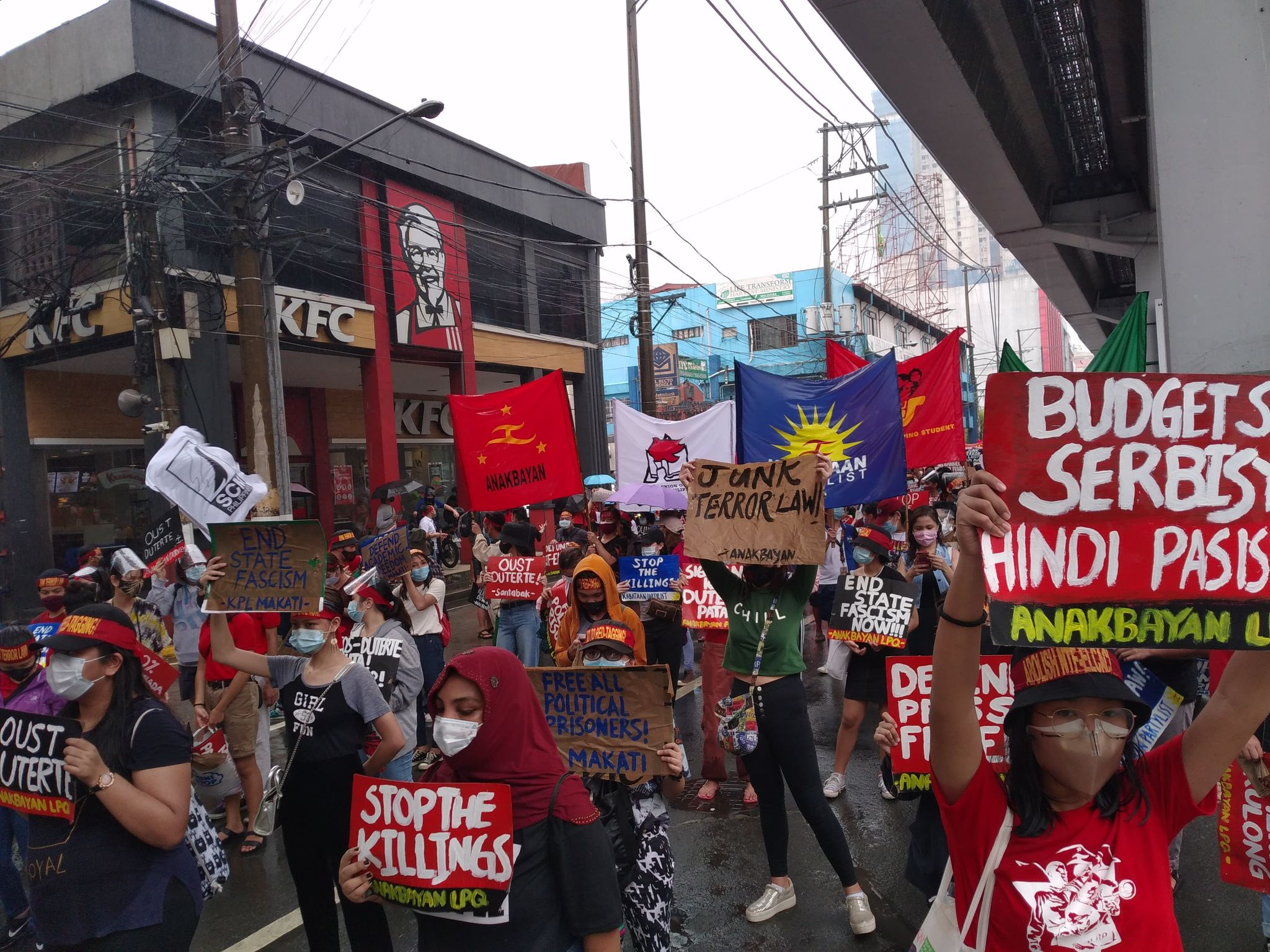
International Human Rights Day Protest 2020 included calls to junk the Anti-Terrorism Act, dubbed as "Terror Law".

On June 3, 2020, the House of Representatives approved the HB No. 6875 or known as Anti-Terrorism Act. The bill was certified as "urgent" by President Rodrigo Duterte and the aim of passage of the bill is to response to the threat in the country. On the bill, it states that "any law enforcer to arrest and detain without warrant 'a person suspected of committing any of the acts' punishable under the measure for 14 calendar days, extendable by 10 days and "the suspected 'terrorist' can also be placed under surveillance for 60 days, extendable by up to 30 more days, by the police or the military."

However, it was met by massive criticism among politicians, religious organizations, and as well as celebrities: Catholic and Protestant organizations condemned the anti-terror law, stating that "we believe that the anti-terrorism bill will insidiously strip away respect for human rights and other civil liberties". Several lawmakers from Mindanao expressed their alarm over the bill, saying that the bill will only incite violence, instead of ending the terrorism. The Commission of Human Rights (CHR) also expressed concerns over the bill. Vice President Leni Robredo questioned the timing of the passage of the Anti-Terrorism Act of 2020. Various groups held a rally to protest the bill on June 3 and 4, citing that the government will use it to harass, abduct, and silence the critics of the Duterte administration and also arresting the citizens without the warrant. Outside the Philippines, American singer Taylor Swift expressed her opposition to the bill through her Instagram story. Swedish environmental activist teenager Greta Thunberg also joined the petition against anti-terrorism law.

=== Red-tagging ===
Red-tagging refers to the malicious blacklisting of individuals or organizations critical or not fully supportive of the actions of a sitting government administration. This blacklisting takes the form of being "tagged" as either a Communist or terrorist or both, regardless of one's actual political beliefs or group affiliations. Such blacklisting is a form of incitement and has pernicious effects on its targets.

The red-tagging, under the Duterte administration, came into light in October 2020 when local celebrities Angel Locsin, Liza Soberano, and Catriona Gray were being "red-tagged" by the military. Locsin, after merely criticizing Congress, was accused of being a terrorist and a member of the NPA. Lt. Gen. Antonio Parlarde Jr. of the National Task Force to End Local Communist Armed Conflict (NTF-ELCAC) urged supporters of the government to refrain from “red tagging” actress Liza Soberano after she appeared on a webinar of GABRIELA, but appeared to have done it himself anyway. Parlade warned her that engaging with activist groups like GABRIELA would make her end up like activist Josephine Lapira, who allegedly joined the NPA and was killed in an armed encounter with government troops. He also red-tagged several other celebrities who are vocal against the government, such as beauty queen Catriona Gray and actress Angel Locsin. Soberano's camp denounced the "red tagging" of the actress. GABRIELA, with senators Risa Hontiveros and Kiko Pangilinan defended Soberano and criticized Parlarde's "red tagging," while the Concerned Artists of the Philippines (CAP) urged the general to retract his statement and apologize to the actress.

=== Duterte's absence from the public eye / #NasaanAngPangulo ===
Duterte's absence from the public eye during the press briefings in preparation for incoming typhoons (recently typhoons Goni (Rolly) and Vamco (Ulysses)) drew uproar on social media and the hashtag #NasaanAngPangulo (#WhereisthePresident) trended on Twitter. As a result, several youths staged a protest to condemn the government's lack of response to the recent calamities and also calling Duterte to step down if he did not heed the demands of the strike. Duterte defended his absence, stating that he visited his parents' grave in Davao.

Ironically, the hashtag #NasaanAngBisePresidente (#WhereistheVicePresident) was dominated on Twitter, asking the whereabouts of Vice President Leni Robredo during the onslaught of Tropical Storm Krovanh (Vicky) on December 19, 2020, that brought massive flooding in parts of Mindanao.

The hashtag trended once again on April 7, 2021, following Duterte's cancellation of his weekly national address, in which netizens aired their speculations over the president's health and whereabouts. On the same day, Presidential Spokesperson Harry Roque said that Duterte would not deliver his public address due to the rising number of COVID-19 cases.

=== Termination of 1989 UP-DND accord ===
The 1989 University of the Philippines–Department of National Defense accord was a bilateral agreement between the Department of National Defense (DND) and the University of the Philippines (UP) that restricted military and police access and operations inside the university. The agreement was signed by then-UP President Jose V. Abueva and then-Defense Secretary Fidel V. Ramos following the arrest of Donato Continente, a staffer of The Philippine Collegian and an alleged communist, who was arrested within the premises of the university for his involvement in the killing of US Army Col. James Nicholas Rowe on April 21, 1989. As a response, the University of the Philippines held a rally to condemn the termination of the agreement.

=== Other causes ===
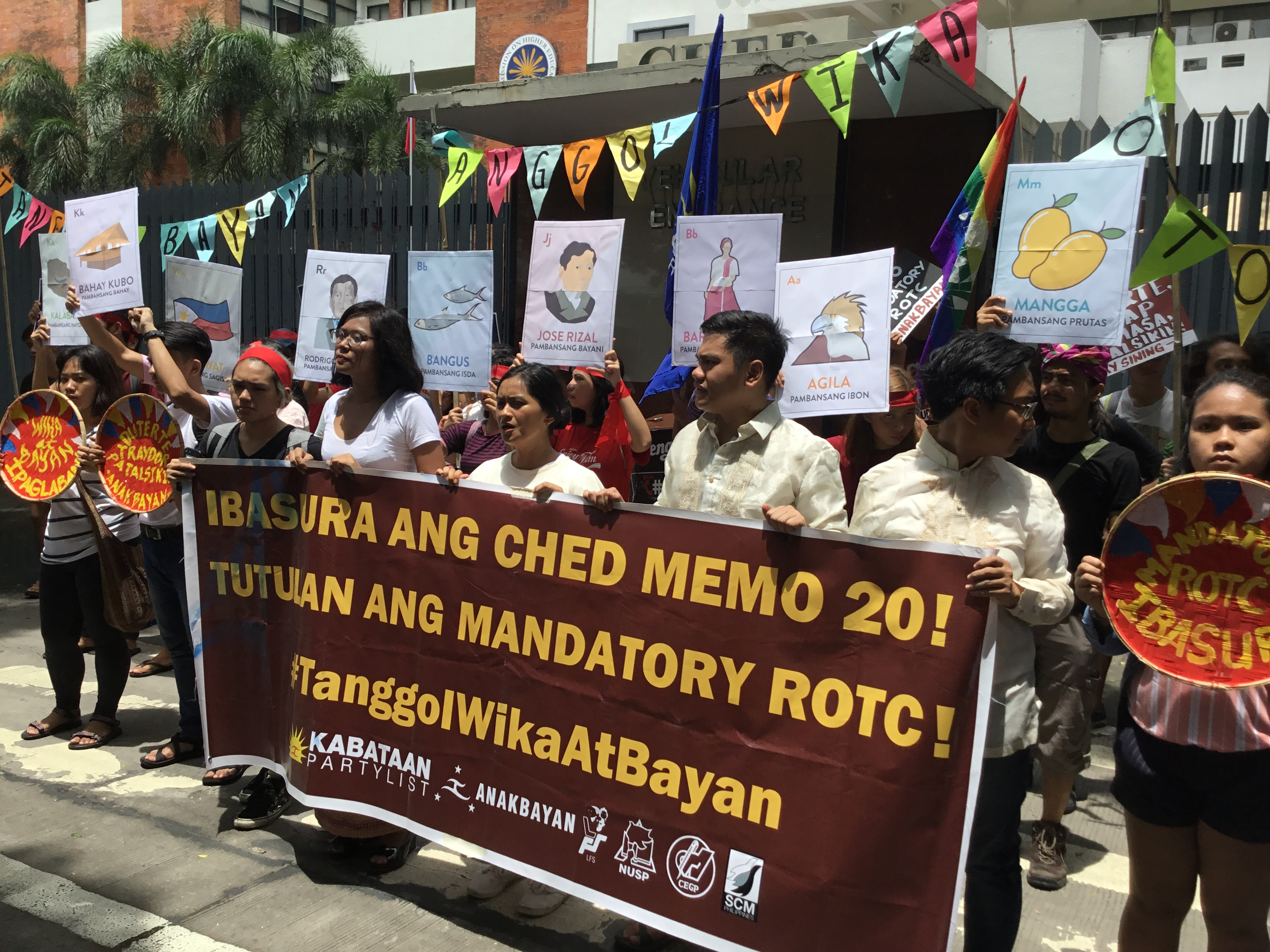
Protests of students along the gates of the Commission on Higher Education.

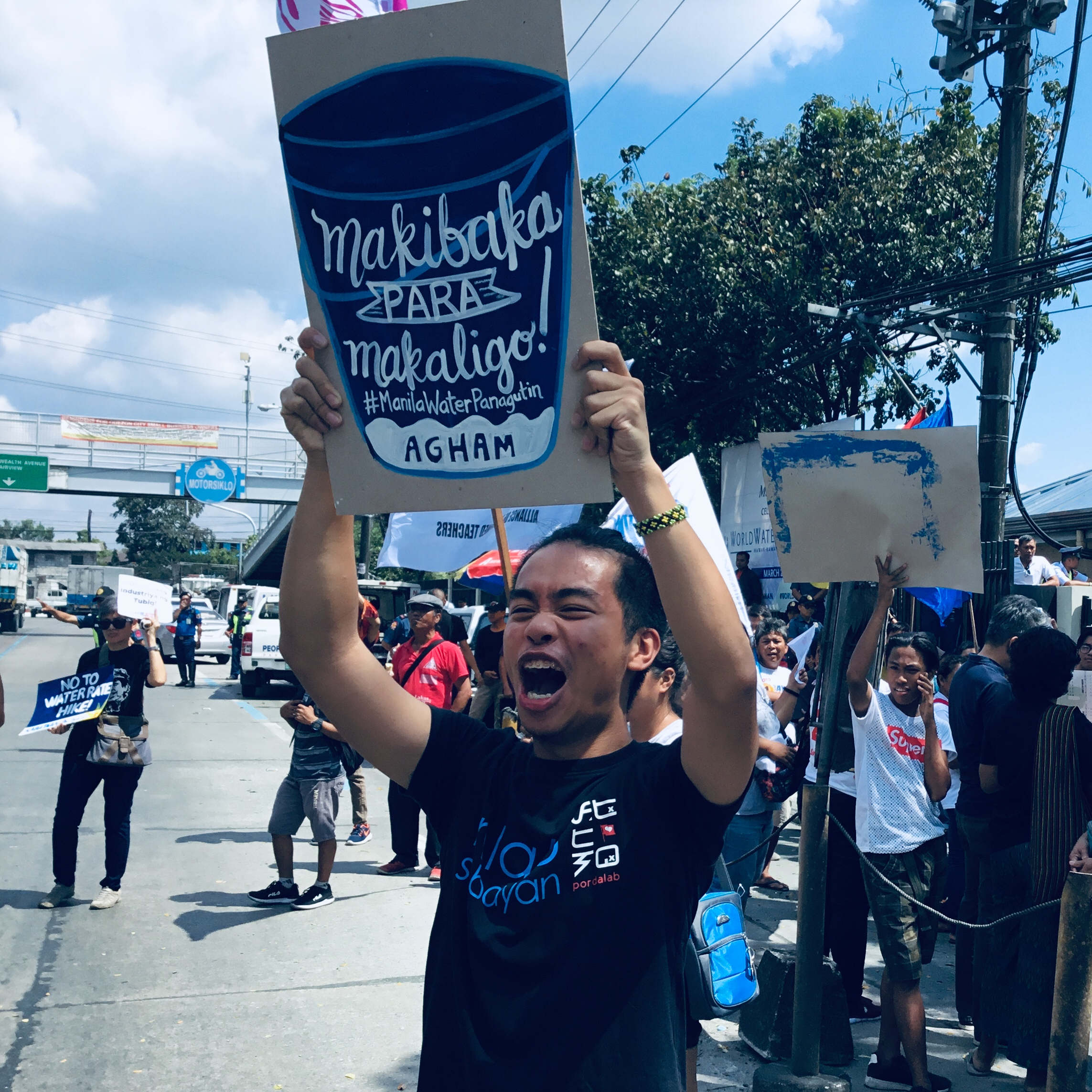
Different sectors rallied on the issue of water shortage.

Aside from above-mentioned issues, demonstrators also protested other issues such as:

- Implementation of the K–12 program (Note: K-12 program, officially known as Republic Act (RA) 10533, was approved by then-President Benigno Aquino III on May 15, 2013.)
- Lack of a permanent solution for the rice crisis and the impending rice tariffication law
- Education-related issues such as public universities collecting miscellaneous and tuition fees despite the signing on August 3, 2017, of Republic Act No. 10931 mandating free education in public schools, the application for tuition hikes by private schools, and the government's "negligence" to education amid the COVID-19 pandemic.
- Slow response on rehabilitation of Typhoon Yolanda in Tacloban: Typhoon Haiyan, locally known in the country as "Yolanda", made landfall in the country on November 8, 2013, leaving more than 6,300 people dead. Despite the disaster happening during the Benigno Aquino III administration, they displayed caricatures of both Aquino and Duterte, as Duterte promised in the first year of his presidency to fast-track Tacloban's rehabilitation for Yolanda survivors. Five years after the disaster, the survivors protested the government's failed rehabilitation efforts.
- Water shortages and interruptions across Metro Manila: Several households in Metro Manila suffered a major water crisis in 2019. In response to the crisis, few Kabataan members held a rally in front of the National Housing Authority (Philippines) to demand efficient water supply. While the group held Maynilad and Manila Water responsible for the water shortage, protesters also blamed the Duterte government for allowing public services to be operated for corporate profits. Duterte would addressed the issue by threatening to terminate the contract with Manila Water and Maynilad amid the water crisis.

== Protests against overseas ties with Duterte ==
=== Ties with China ===
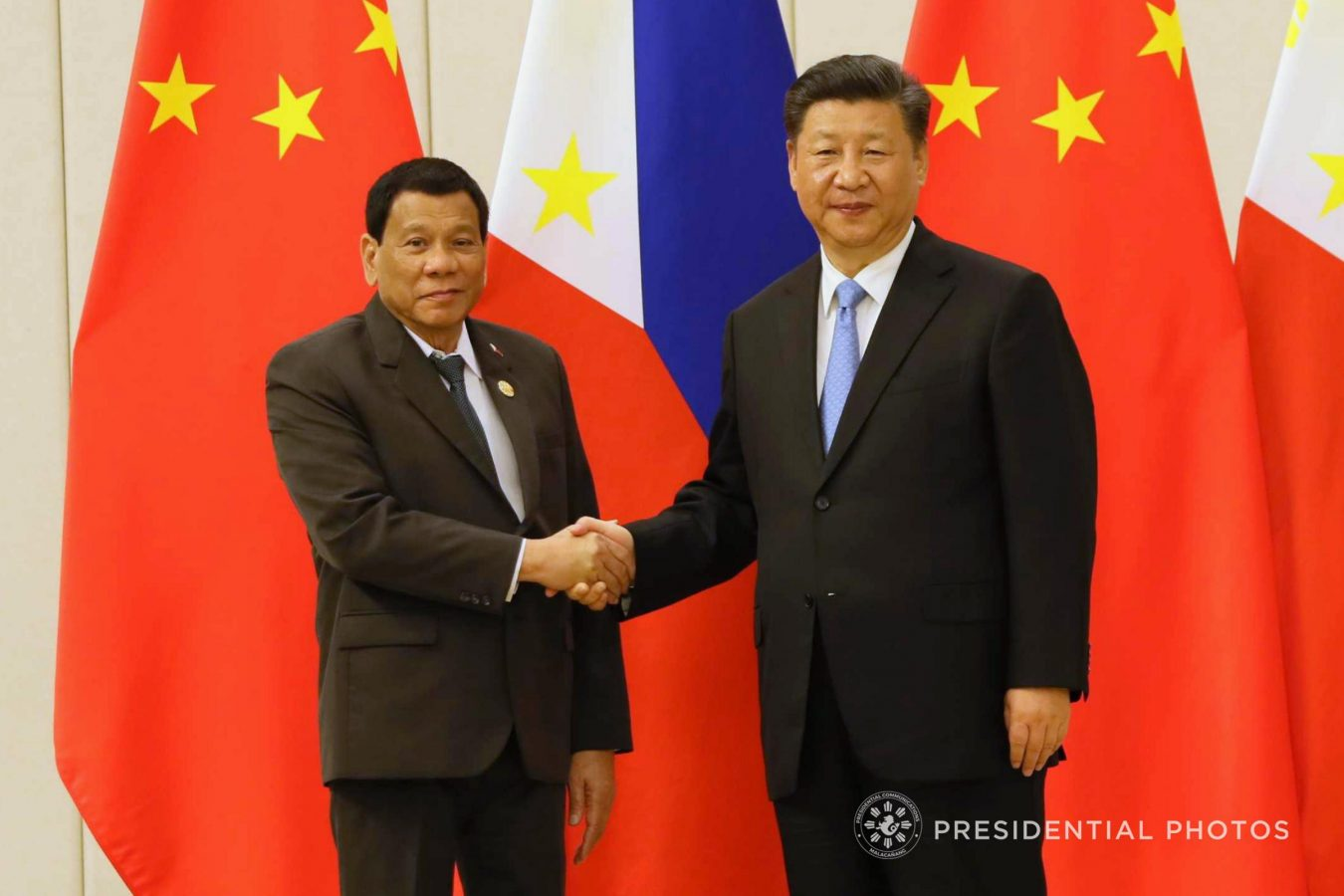
Duterte and Xi in July 2018.

Most militant groups decried the ties between President Duterte and China over the occupation of Chinese vessels and the reported harassment of Filipino fisherfolk amid territorial disputes in the South China Sea.

On July 12, 2018, tarpaulin banners read "WELCOME TO THE PHILIPPINES, PROVINCE OF CHINA" (with a Chinese translation below the text) were hung on several footbridges in Metro Manila, coinciding with the second anniversary of winning the Philippines on its arbitration case against China. The tarpaulins were seen as a possible reference to a "joke" made by Duterte that the country can be a province of the Asian giant, five months earlier. Chinese Ambassador Zhao Jianhua slammed the banners, calling it a "vicious attack" on the "independent foreign policy" pursued by Duterte. Zhao also said that the Philippines "can never be any part of China." The Philippine National Police were investigating the person behind the tarpaulins, but the person was never known. Presidential Spokesperson Harry Roque said that the banners were "absurd" and were made by "enemies" of the government. Opposition lawmakers Bayan Muna Rep. Carlos Zarate and Alliance of Concerned Teachers Rep. Antonio Tinio denied that leftist groups were behind the tarpaulins.

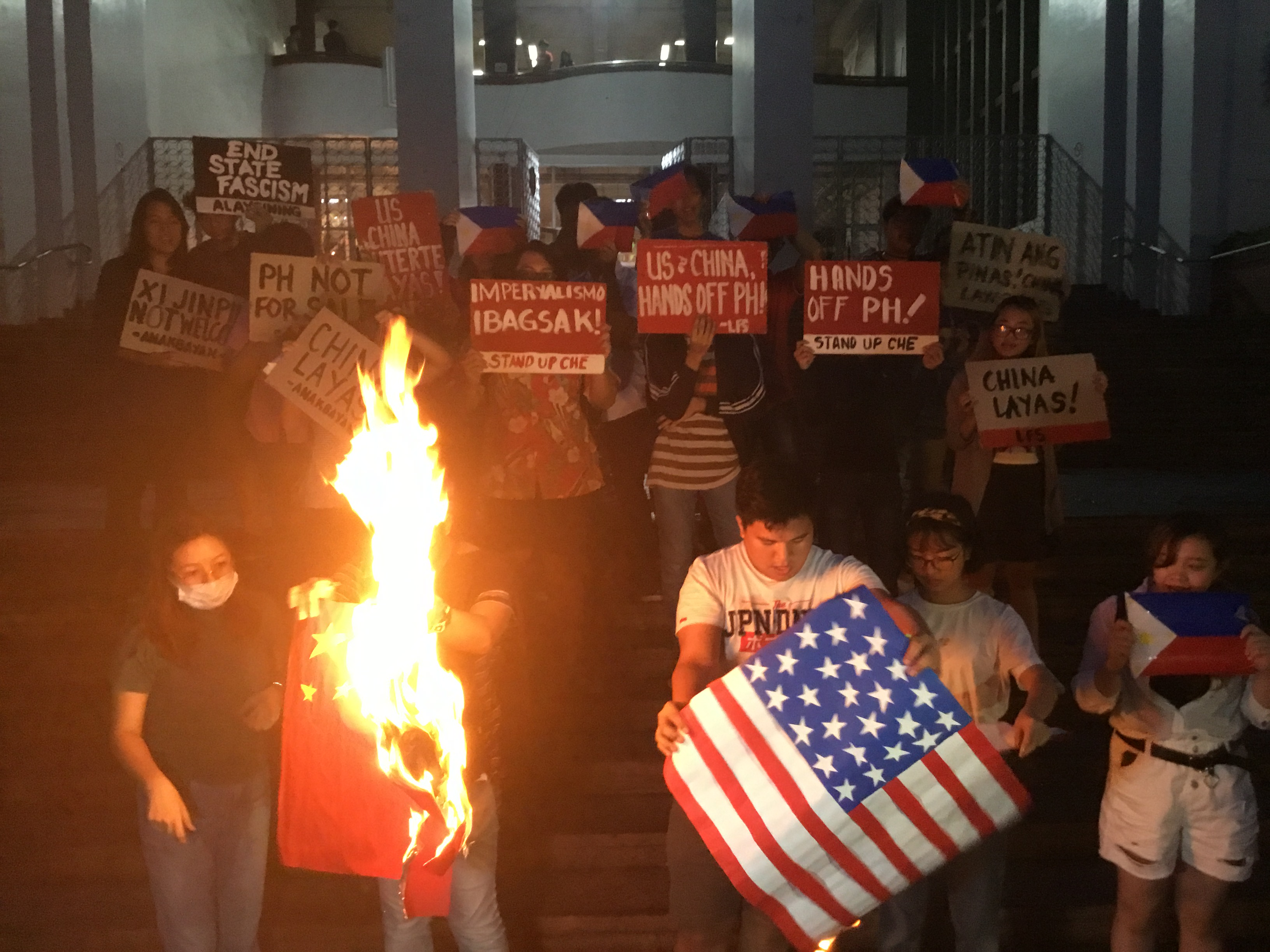
Student-activists from University of the Philippines and Ateneo de Manila University burn the flags of China and US to protest against their encroachment of Philippine sovereignty.

The state visit of General Secretary of the Chinese Communist Party Xi Jinping on November 19–21, 2018, triggered protests by militant groups, who called him to "go away" in Mandarin. The reason they held a protest was that the Philippines "sold" its territories to China.

=== Ties with the United States ===
The United States is one of the countries critical to Philippine drug war campaign, in which then-President Barack Obama and U.S. senators condemned and denounced the human rights abuses amid the campaign. Nevertheless, the United States Senate discussed the drug war in late 2016, noting the possibility that U.S. State Department assistance to the Philippines might be used to commit gross human rights violations. Regardless of the sitting U.S. president, most of the militant groups – particularly left-wing groups – aimed protests at the United States through placards and streamers denouncing "imperialism" and neoliberal policies, with Trump-Duterte effigies displayed on some occasions. Rights groups, activists, and academics have claimed that despite the condemnation, the U.S. continues to fund the war on drugs and Duterte's anti-insurgency program. Moreover, they cite the continuation and upholding of such treaties as the Enhanced Defense Cooperation Agreement (EDCA) as examples of the US breaching Philippine sovereignty. Anti-imperialist group League of Filipino Students also accused Duterte of allowing the entry of American warships and other military equipment as part of the Balikatan exercises in the country.

Amid escalating tension between Iran and the U.S. following the killing of Qasem Soleimani in a drone strike conducted by the United States on January 3, 2020, the Philippine government planned to send Philippine military to the Middle East, triggering condemnation and protests by various militant groups on January 10, 2020. According to protesters, this plan would put overseas Filipino workers there at risk should the Philippines ally with the U.S.

==== Donald Trump's visit to the Philippines ====
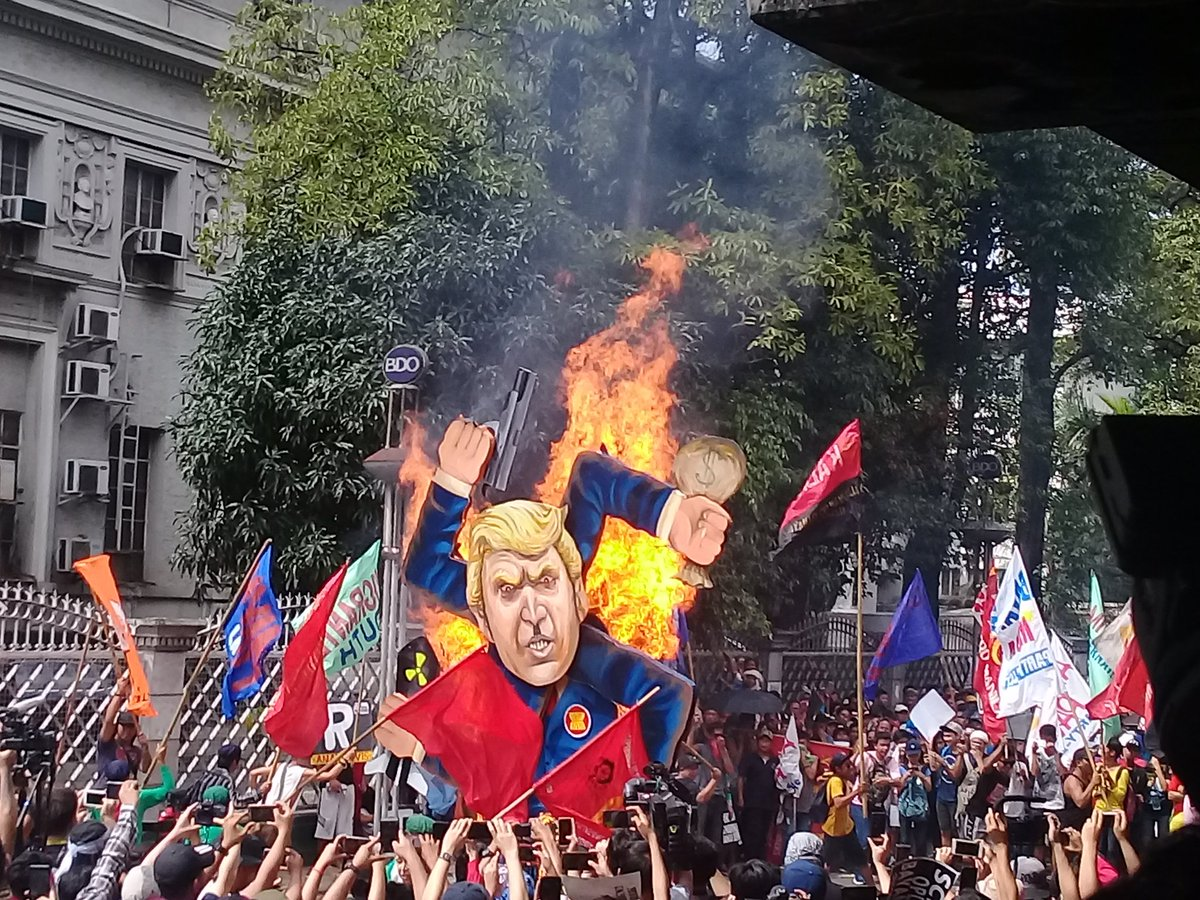
Activists burn rotating Trump effigy, dubbed as "Fascist Spinner," inspired by the fidget spinner.

Numerous militant groups staged a series of protests from November 9 to 14, 2017, against the Association of Southeast Asian Nations (ASEAN) Summit hosted by the Philippines. Their call was to ban the visit of U.S. President Donald Trump, who was scheduled to attend ASEAN-related summits as a dialogue partner. According to student leader Elijah San Pedro, this was because Trump seems "to have dragged the Philippines into his war rhetorics against North Korea." Atty. Aaron Pedrosa of Sanlakas also said that the Mamasapano massacre and the war in Marawi were created by the U.S.-led war on terror. Karapatan Alliance for the Advancement of People's Rights slammed the Trump administration for "'funding' the administration's war on drugs." The Philippine Coast Guard alleged that protesters attempted to bribe fisherfolk to get them close to the United States Embassy. A group of protesters led by Anakbayan managed to reach the gate of Philippine International Convention Center, despite tight security.

Militant group Kalipunan ng Damayang Mahihirap (Kadamay) also staged protests against Trump. The group said that the ₱15.5-billion ($292 million) budget of the ASEAN Summit could have been used to assist the poor. Bagong Alyansang Makabayan burned an effigy of President Rodrigo Duterte and Trump, who was depicted with four rotating hands shaped into the swastika symbol. In addition to images of Trump, protesters also burned images of Australian Prime Minister Malcolm Turnbull, Japanese Prime Minister Shinzō Abe, Russian President Vladimir Putin, and Chinese Premier Li Keqiang, whom protesters said are responsible for the anti-Filipino and imperialistic agenda allegedly promoted by the Duterte administration.

Anti-riot police used water cannons and a sonic alarm to repel activists. Despite being fired at with water cannons, protesters continued to push forward against the blocking police. Twenty members of militant groups were reportedly injured after the clash with the police. Trump arrived in the country on November 12.

== Events ==
=== Following the burial of Ferdinand Marcos ===
Protests against Rodrigo Duterte started when late dictator Ferdinand Marcos was buried on November 18, 2016, at the Libingan ng mga Bayani, described by the media as a "surprise burial". Remembering the Marcos dictatorship era, thousands of protesters, including well-known personalities and politicians, staged the protests.

=== Protests organized by religious groups ===
The "Walk for Life" was a mass demonstration organized by the Catholic Bishops' Conference of the Philippines (CBCP) protesting proposals to reintroduce the death penalty and calling for an end to killings amid the country's ongoing war on drugs. The event was first announced on late January 2017 by former CBCP President Socrates Villegas. On February 18, the march gathered approximately 20,000 Filipino Catholics in Manila.

An estimated 3,500 protesters attended a November 5, 2017 prayer rally and healing mass, dubbed "Lord, Heal Our Land", organized by the Catholic Church on EDSA to oppose the extrajudicial killings. The organizers said the event was meant to express frustration and not "destabilization." On February 24, 2018, thousands of people joined at the Quirino Grandstand.

=== People Power Revolution anniversary ===
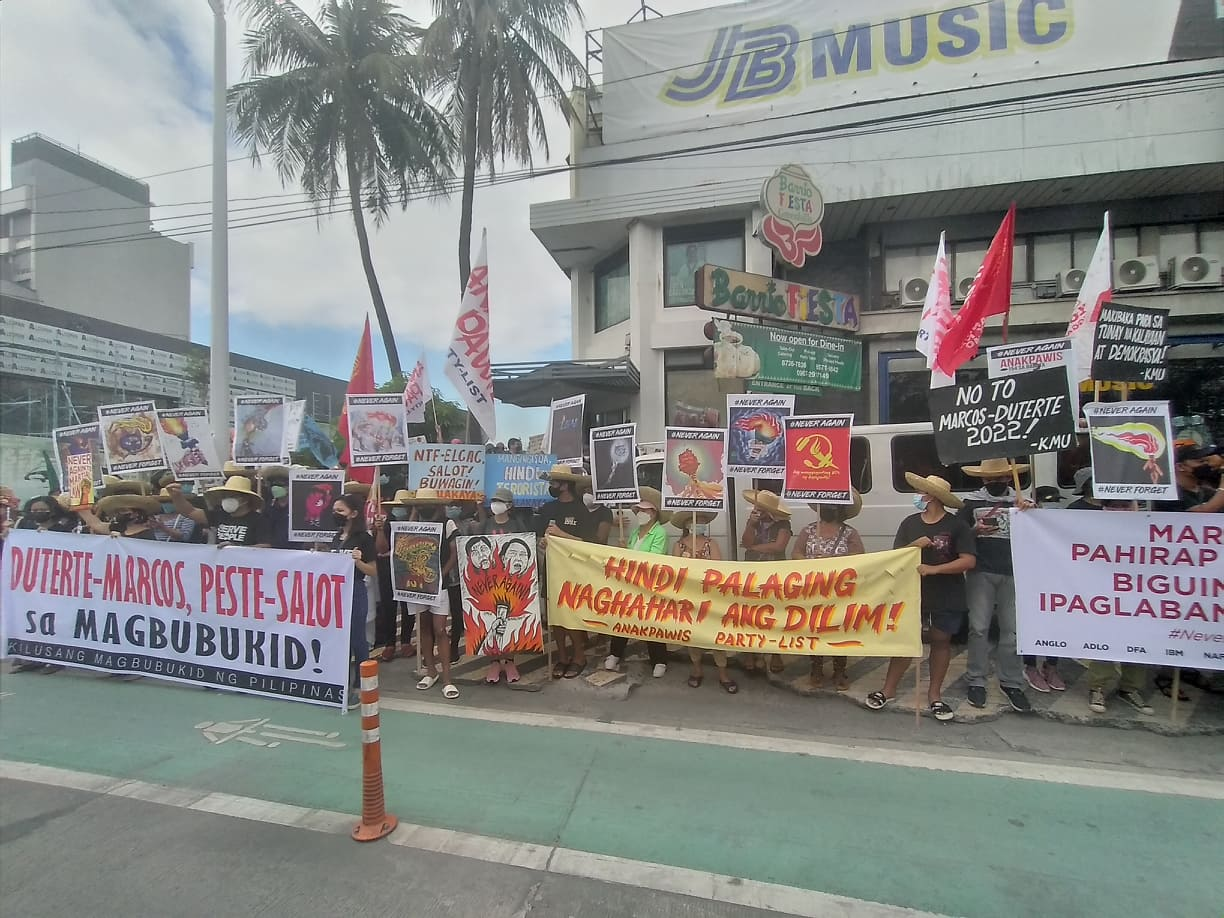
Mobilization on the 36th anniversary of EDSA People Power, February 25, 2022.

Demonstrators commemorated the 32nd anniversary of People Power Revolution on February 25, 2018. Several groups including students, activists, and other opponents held protests against Duterte administration actions.

On February 23, 2019, more than 1,300 supporters of the opposition gathered at the People Power Monument in White Plains to commemorate the 33rd anniversary of People Power Revolution and denounced the administration-backed senatorial candidates for 2019 including former presidential aide Bong Go and former Ilocos Norte Governor Imee Marcos. Opposition figures also issued statements ahead of the event.

On February 24, about 600 people, joined by former President Benigno Aquino III and supporters of opposition senatorial candidates from Otso Diretso, gathered at the People Power Monument, where footage of Duterte's expletive speeches were projected on stage. In his speech, Aquino broke the silence on the Dengvaxia controversy and the measles outbreak.

On February 22, 2020, ahead of 34th anniversary, demonstrators gathered at the People Power Monument to protest how Duterte is allegedly "allowing China to breach Philippine sovereignty" and called for Duterte to resign from office. On February 24, a group of artists projected their graffiti depicting a wanted poster of Duterte on the walls of Philippine National Police. The PNP condemned the digital graffiti, stating that the People Power Revolution "makes it totally deplorable." On February 25, several people attended the event, including former Vice President Jejomar Binay and former Senators Rene Saguisag and Serge Osmeña. Organizers had projected fewer attendees due to the outbreak of COVID-19 in the country.

On the anniversary of the People Power Revolution in 2021, several demonstrators marched toward the People Power Monument.

=== Labor Day protests ===
On May 1, 2018, about 20,000 protesters (Note: Another source said 6,920 from the police estimate.) clad in red shirts and featuring Duterte's effigies gathered at Mendiola rejecting the executive order ending the "end-of-contract scheme" (endo) signed by Duterte, claiming that what Duterte signed about was not the EO they negotiated with the Department of Labor and Employment (DOLE). The signed EO dismayed labor groups and garnered mixed reception from various other groups.

On April 30, 2019, few members of Tindig Pilipinas gathered at the headquarters of DOLE to protest the increasing number of Chinese workers in the country. On May 1, several militant groups held a rally on Labor Day, condemning the government's failure to stop endo contractualization, and the TRAIN Law and demanding an increase in the daily minimum wage increase to PHP750. According to the Philippine National Police, about 8,000 people attended the rally.

In 2020, militants held a Labor Day protest online due to COVID-19 pandemic lockdown.

On April 20, 2021, militant labor groups distributed at community pantries pamphlets criticizing Duterte and enticing people to join the Labor Day protest to oust the president from office. On May 1, several groups were prevented by police to reach Mendiola Street, reminding them to follow the minimum health standards amidst the implementation of Modified Enhance Community Quarantine (MECQ) in Metro Manila. The groups held a rally at the Welcome Rotonda calling for wage increase and P10,000 (approximately US$207 in 2021) aid for those affected by the pandemic. Some protesters, including Bishop Broderick Pabillo, held a rally via online.

=== Independence Day (June 12) protests ===
On June 12, 2018, President Duterte's Independence Day speech in Kawit, Cavite, was interrupted when 10 demonstrators chanted "Hunyo 12, huwad na kalayaan! Duterte patalsikin, pasista biguin!" (transl. "12th of June, a false independence! Duterte must be ousted, the fascist must be defeated!") Duterte remained calm and acknowledging "the protesters' right to express their thoughts and feelings." A demonstrator was arrested for “interrupting public order”.

=== Duterte's State of the Nation Address ===
The protests during the State of the Nation Addresses of Rodrigo Duterte were held every fourth Monday of July.

=== Anniversary of the 1972 martial law declaration ===
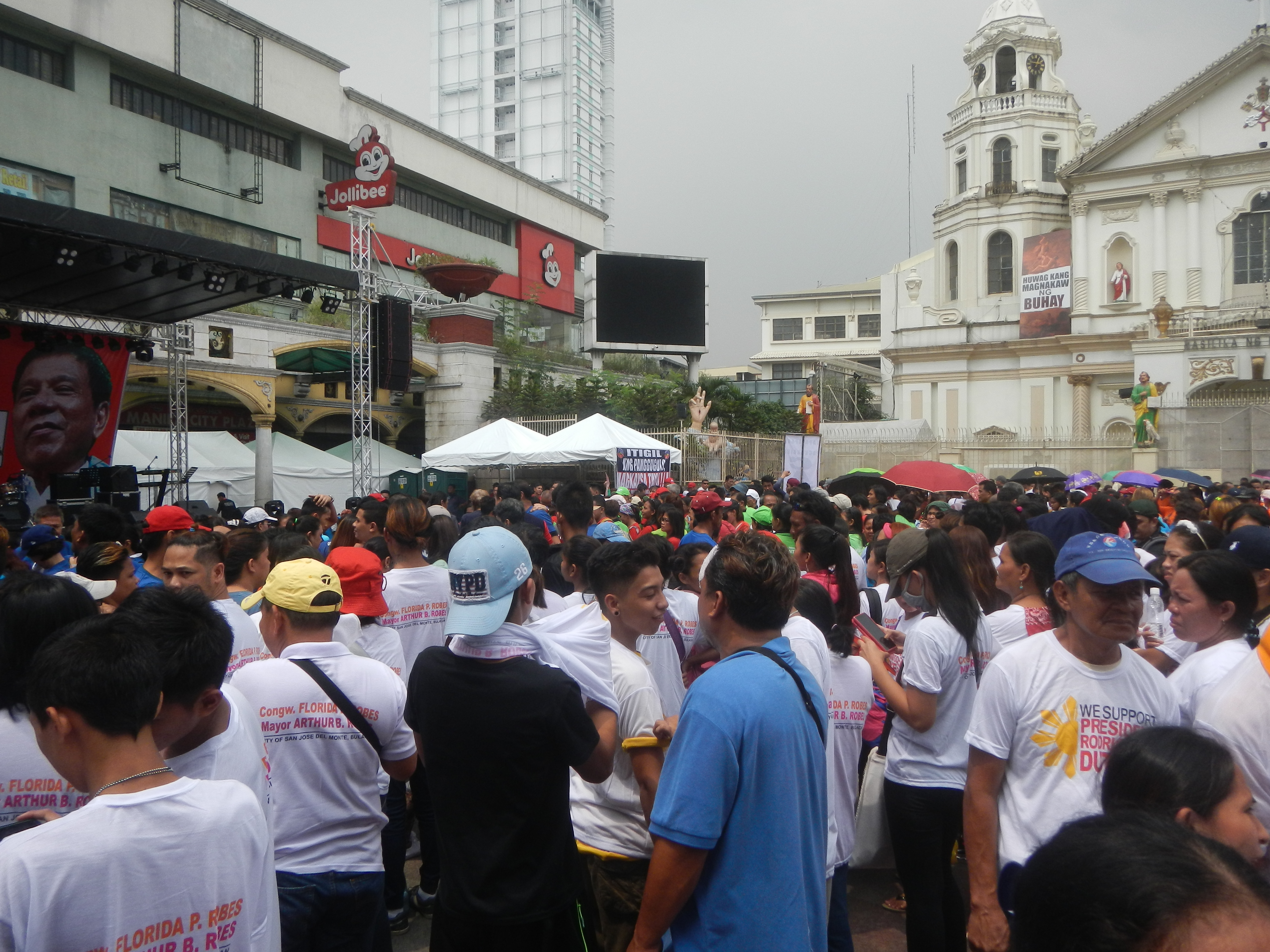
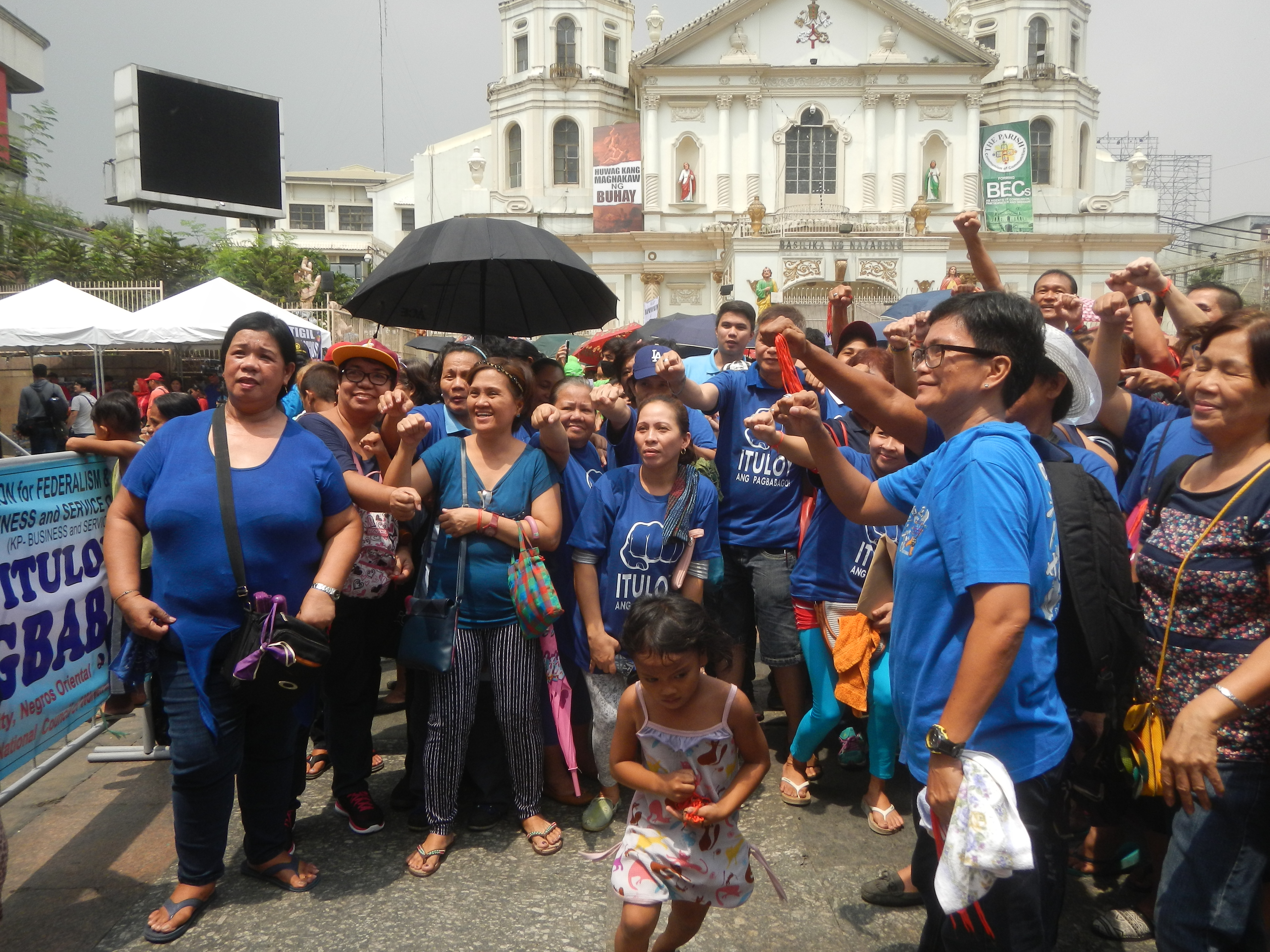
Supporters of Duterte gathered at the front of the Quiapo Church during the National Day of Protest. They claimed that 12,000 had attended the event.

On September 21, 2017, nationwide protests — also known as the "National Day of Protest" — were conducted by various groups against the government's implementation of the war on drugs and the ongoing state of martial law in the whole of Mindanao under the Duterte administration, as part of the commemoration of the 45th anniversary of the declaration of martial law in 1972 by the late President Marcos. As the day of protest approached, Malacañang Palace released Duterte's Proclamation No. 319 and Memorandum Circular no. 26 suspending government offices and public school classes on September 21. Duterte said that he will not condone acts of violence by protesters and dared the communist New People's Army "to bring the protests to Manila, because he vowed not to arrest them."

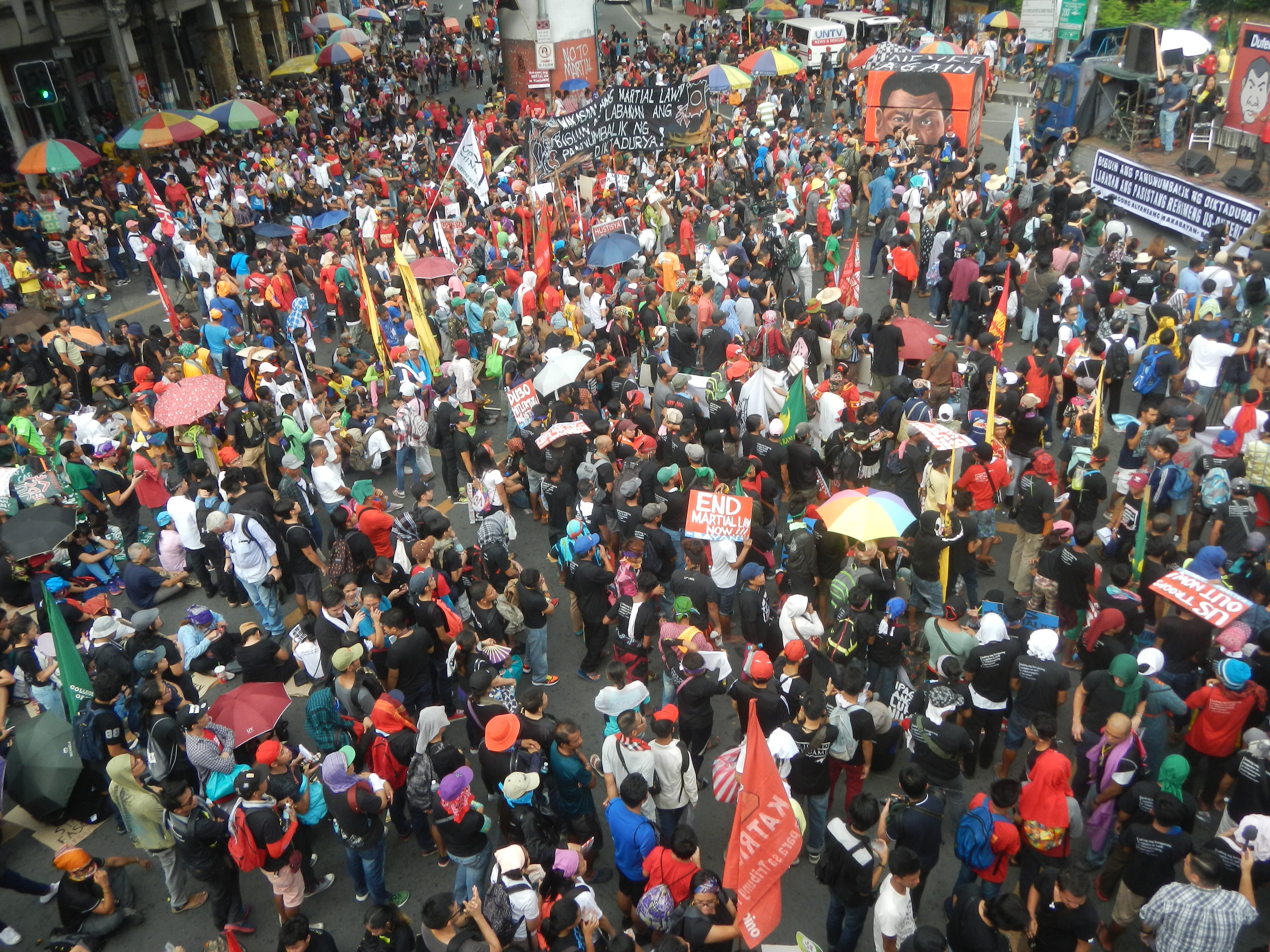
Protesters at Mendiola

Left-wing activists and opposition of Duterte accused him of abuses and authoritarianism similar to that of Marcos. In Plaza Miranda, about 500 pro-Duterte rallyists gathered in front of the Quiapo Church. Pro and anti-Duterte rallyists also engaged in chant battle. A group of pro-Duterte supporters are seen elsewhere in the city, calling to stop the "destabilization," which is rumored to be made by the opposition. The protesters also adapted the Tagalog version of "Do You Hear the People Sing?". Online, cosplayers launched a viral series of photos depicting popular superheroes holding placards condemning extrajudicial killings and government corruption. The initiative was attacked by trolls resulting in its deletion within an hour of publication; however, the photos were quickly restored.

On September 21, 2018, nationwide protests marking the 46th anniversary of Martial Law were conducted mainly by several groups such as Youth Act Now Against Tyranny and Bagong Alyansang Makabayan. The event was attended by former Chief Justice Maria Lourdes Sereno, while Liberal Party members held the event by mass. Pro-Duterte supporters also held the demonstration.

On September 21, 2019, various groups staged protests commemorating the anniversary of martial law. The event was attended by martial law victims.

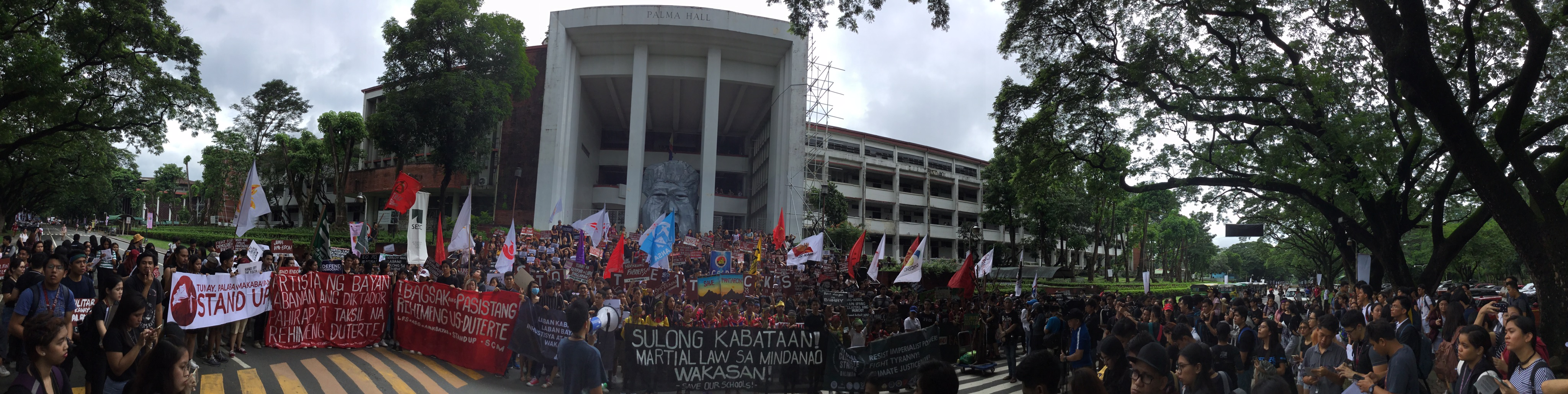
Walkout protest at the University of the Philippines Diliman commemorating the 47th anniversary of the declaration of martial law.

On its anniversary in 2020, several protesters held a rally in the streets of Metro Manila using pictures of Ferdinand Marcos as a social distance marker. On September 21, 2021, several groups holding a rally to mark the 49th anniversary of the declaration were blocked by the police from reaching their destinations such as Liwasang Bonifacio and Welcome Rotonda.

=== Pandi housing project protests ===
Militant group Kadamay (Kalipunan ng Damayang Mahihirap) began their protests on March 8, 2017, when its members illegally occupied unused government housing units in Pandi, Bulacan. The group criticized the National Housing Authority (Philippines) and President Duterte for not providing decent housing for poor people. Other militant groups Kilusang Mayo Uno, Bagong Alyansang Makabayan, Makabayan, Gabriela and Anakpawis joined the protests. On March 24, Kadamay demonstrators protesting an NHA eviction notice attempted to break the NHA gate, injuring one protester. The protests ended on April 4 when Duterte announced that members of Kadamay may live in the occupied units, as long as they do not oust police officers and soldiers already residing in the neighboring houses.

In the aftermath of Pandi occupation, Kadamay gathered at the headquarters of the Office of the Ombudsman, demanding livelihood so that they can pay for the occupied houses.

=== Martial law in Mindanao ===
Following the declaration of martial law in Mindanao on May 23, 2017, amid the Battle of Marawi, protests were held on Mendiola Street, calling for the revocation of the declaration. Protesters cited the increase of human rights violation cases because of the course of martial law and said martial law was not the solution to the situation happening in Mindanao. On May 29, various groups including Lumad and Moro people and farmers from Mindanao gathered in separate places in Metro Manila to condemn the declaration of martial law and alleged killing of innocent civilians amid the Marawi crisis. Demonstrators from Southern Tagalog marched to Mendiola, and some groups gathered at the Senate.

On July 21, 2017, a Senate session on martial law extension was interrupted by eight militant groups, who were immediately arrested. At the session, the lawmakers asked about reports of human rights violations, which were denied by the Armed Forces of the Philippines (AFP). On December 13, 2017, Congress granted Duterte's request to extend martial law with a vote of 240–27 (14–4 from the Senate, 226–23 from the House), causing another batch of protests. On December 13, 2018, the Senate and the House of Representatives approved President Duterte's request to extend martial law in Mindanao until 2019 triggering protests, whose participants were from Mindanao.

=== Bonifacio Day protests ===
On November 30, 2017, as part of Bonifacio Day celebration, a protest was held, condemning the revolutionary government threat. On the other side, around thousands of Duterte supporters gathered at Mendiola, urging Duterte to declare a revolutionary government. Presidential spokesperson Harry Roque advised the pro-revolutionary government supporters "to conduct their rallies in a peaceful, orderly manner." Harry Roque also said that "The president has earlier said that he does not want a revolutionary government. This, however, does not mean he would prevent citizens from expressing their support for a revolutionary government."

On November 28, 2018, labor groups staged a protest in Mendiola and said they will stay until November 30, Bonifacio Day. Kilusang Mayo Uno chairperson Elmer Labog said that they will not stop demonstrating until Malacañang entertains them about not only regularization and wage increase but also stopping the military presence in Mindanao amidst ongoing martial law. On November 30, 2018, demonstrators marched at Mendiola bringing the effigy of Duterte depicted as king, which was then destroyed by using shovel and dummy sledgehammer.

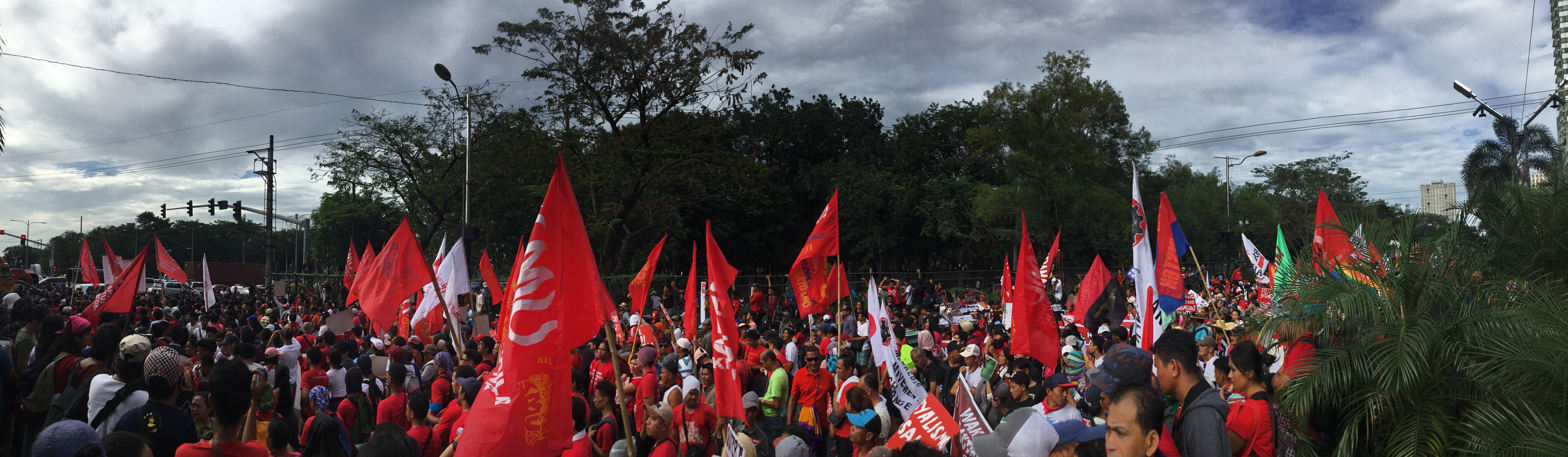
Bonifacio Day 2018 protest.

On its anniversary of 2019, militant groups staged protests on Bonifacio Day carrying caricatures of Duterte, along with U.S. President Donald Trump and Chinese leader Xi Jinping. In 2020, protests were held in the streets of Manila condemning red-tagging, anti-terror law and the death of NPA medic Jevilyn Cullamat, daughter of Bayan Muna Representative Eufemia Cullamat, who was killed in a clash in Marihatag, Surigao del Sur with Philippine Army's 3rd Special Forces Battalion on November 28, 2020. Meanwhile, five protesters in Cebu were arrested.

=== Revocation of Rappler ===
National Union of Journalists of the Philippines staged a protest, dubbed as "Black Friday Protest for Freedom," in Quezon City and other parts of the country such as Bacolod and Zamboanga City on the evening of January 19, 2018, following the revocation of online news site Rappler by Securities and Exchange Commission (SEC) eight days prior. At the same time, National Bureau of Investigation issued a subpoena against CEO Maria Ressa, former reporter Reynaldo Santos, and businessman Benjamin Bitanga for violating the anti-cybercrime act. The protest was attended by 300 people wearing black T-shirts. Rappler is known to be critical of the Duterte administration. Presidential Spokesperson Harry Roque said that Duterte has no involvement in the SEC's decision. Roque said that the Friday protest "is a testament that freedom is alive and democracy is alive in the Philippines." The revocation was condemned by opposition figures such as Kadamay chairperson Gloria Arellano, Senators Leila de Lima and Antonio Trillanes National Union of Journalists of the Philippines, Anakbayan, UP Diliman, and the anonymous critic from The New York Times. Other bloggers and journalists were also present at the protest.

=== Quo warranto petition against Sereno ===
On May 11, 2018, supporters of Supreme Court Chief Justice Maria Lourders Sereno gathered at the streets near the Supreme Court after the Court voted 8–6 removing her from the high court. A number of politicians expressed condemnation of the ousting. A prayer rally and protest was conducted in Bacolod, Katipunan Ave, Quezon City, displaying a makeshift coffin that, according to the protesters, symbolizes and mourns the "death of democracy" and the "death of judiciary."

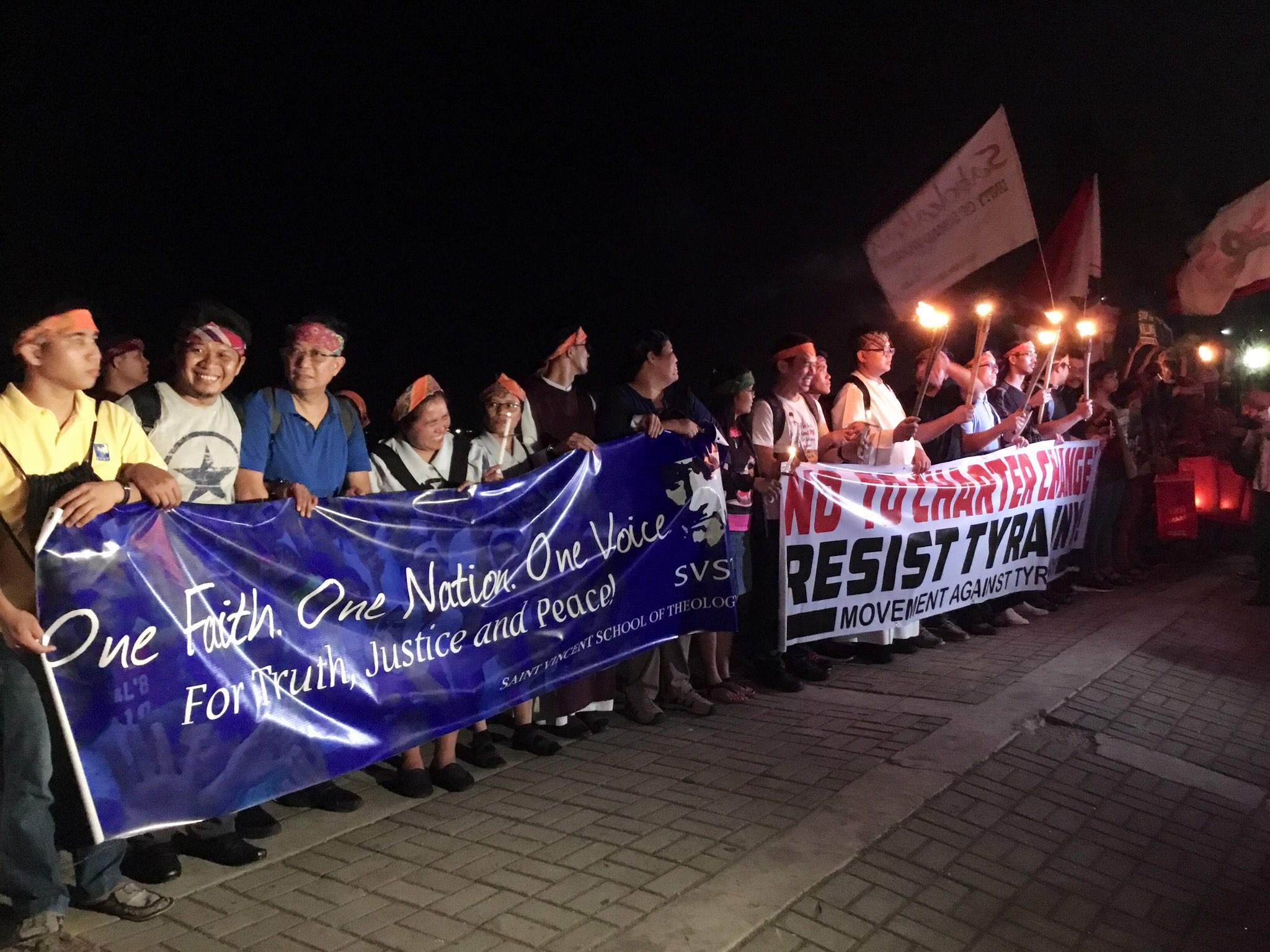
Members of the religious sectors protested against church persecution on January 25, 2019. They were joined by allied groups.

=== Transport strikes ===
Transports groups held a series of strikes protesting the phaseout of old jeepneys on February 6 and 27, leaving hundreds of commuters stranded. As a result of protests, classes and government work were suspended. Transport groups resumed the protests on September 24 and October 14 to 16.

On September 30, transport groups held a nationwide strike, leaving around 95% of routes in Metro Manila paralyzed. The transport groups claimed success of protesting against the jeepney modernization program countering the claim of MMDA Spokesperson Celine Pialago that their strike was "unsuccessful".

=== Manila underpass vandalism ===
On the third week of November 2019, the Lagusnilad underpass in Metro Manila was vandalized with the messages of the protest written in a red-colored spray can., angering Manila Mayor Isko Moreno." The youth group, Panday Sining, a cultural arm of Anakbayan, took responsibility of the vandalism and apologized to the public for "inconvenience", but remains concerned over the ongoing martial law in Mindanao.

=== Other events ===
Farmer groups celebrated the 32nd anniversary of 1987 Mendiola massacre on January 22, 2019, appealing for land reform. Despite the massacre happened during the Corazon Aquino administration, most militant groups aimed at Duterte through their placards. On January 25, 2019, a prayer rally opposing the lowering of age of criminal responsibility was held on January 25, 2019, at Malate, Manila.

=== Outside the Philippines ===
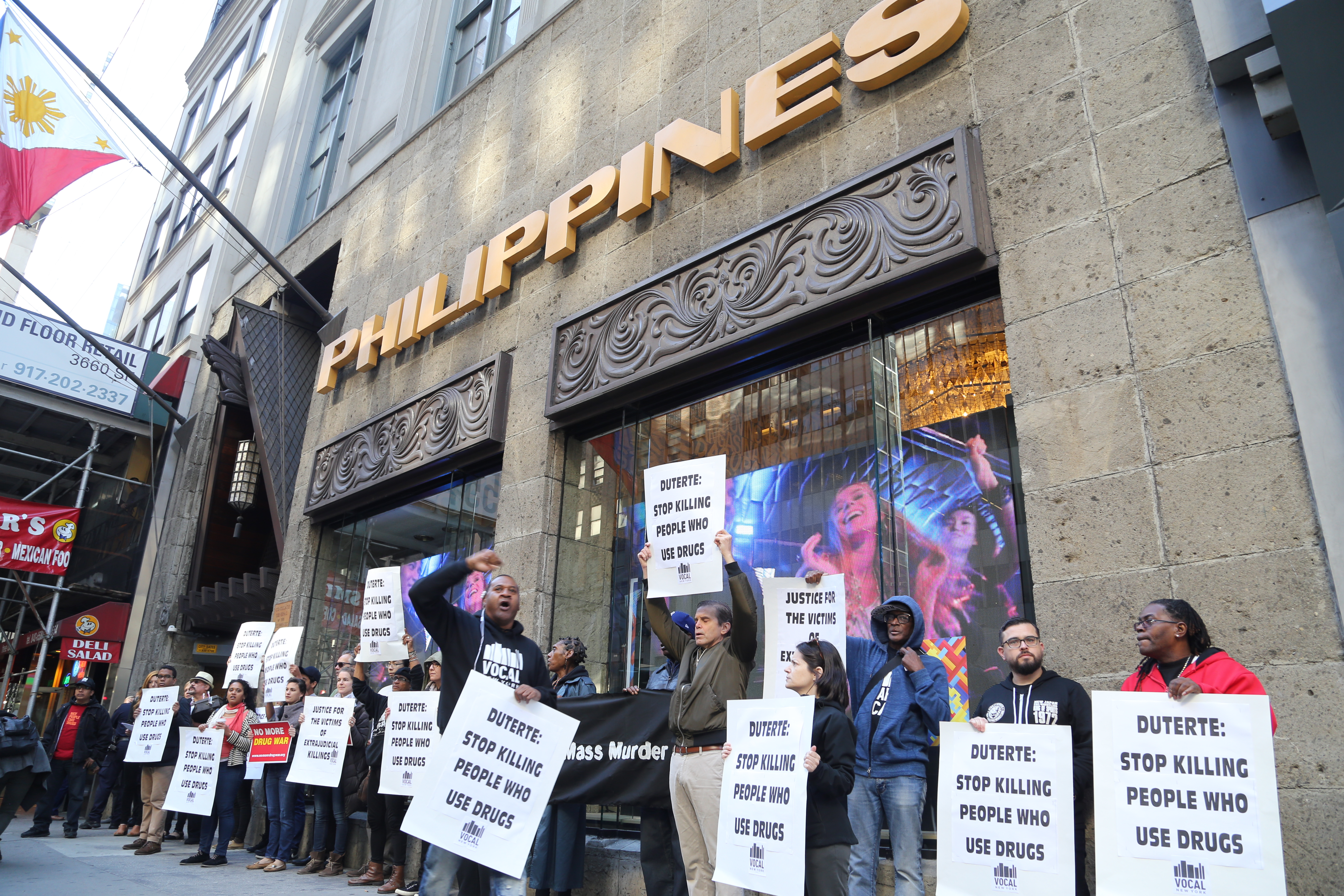
Protest against the Philippine war on drugs in front of the Philippine Consulate General in New York City. The protesters are holding placards which urge Duterte to stop killing drug users.

While the protests are mainly held within the country, there are, yet occasionally, protests being held overseas. The first known documented protests aimed directly against Duterte was held in Philippine consulate in New York City on October 11, 2016, condemning the war on drugs. Following the shooting of 17-year-old student Kian delos Santos on August 16, 2017, massive protests were held in several countries. The state visit of Duterte in Israel was met by the protests on September 4, 2018.

=== Walkouts ===
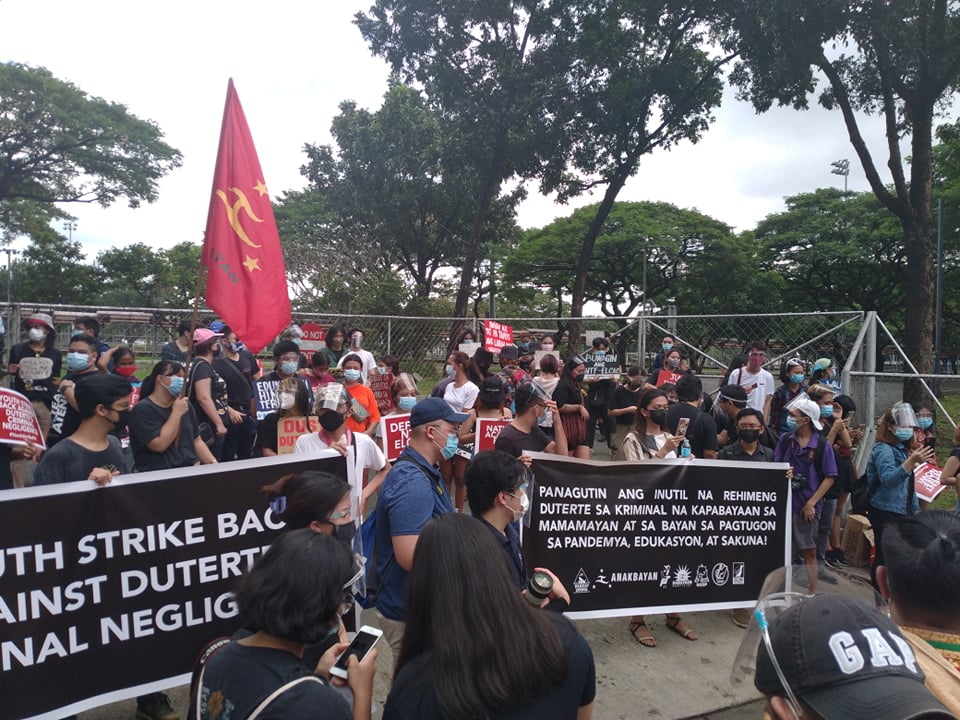
Youth Strike, November 17, 2020, in front of Ateneo de Manila University.

Several students from various universities walked out of their classes to protest the planned jeepney phaseout and ongoing martial law in the Mindanao on February 23, 2018. The hashtag #WalkOutPH reached more than 3,000 tweets and at least 2.6 million impressions on Twitter.

On August 20, 2019, students and staff from the University of the Philippines walked out of their classes to protest the military intervention in their campuses.

Because of the continuous clamor regarding government response on COVID-19, negligence over disaster response after Typhoon Ulysses, and concerns regarding the educational situation, students from Ateneo de Manila University, on November 14, 2020, initiated an academic "Youth Strike" demanding Duterte to step down if he did not heed the demands of the strike. Many students from various universities and colleges followed, and was translated into a physical protest on November 17.

=== Health workers protest ===
On July 16, 2021, health workers held a protest in front of the headquarters of Department of Health (DOH) in Manila, where they threw tomatoes at the DOH logo on the gate. On August 30, September 1, and November 24, 2021, health workers from various hospitals in Manila held a protest at the DOH headquarters over nonpayment salary to their benefits and demanding Secretary Duque and President Duterte to resign over the handling of the COVID-19 pandemic in the country.

== List of protest hashtags ==
Critics and opposition of the government use social media, especially Twitter, as a platform to lambast Duterte for various issues happening in the country.

List
Hashtag	Issues
#OustDuterte / #OustDuterteNow	COVID-19 pandemic in the Philippines; Duterte's remarks of ordering to "shoot" the violators of COVID-19 quarantine protocol during his speech on April 1; Detention of activist Reina Mae Nasino and the subsequent death of her daughter, River Nasino
#StopTheKillingsPH	2020 Tarlac shooting
#JunkTerrorBill	Anti-Terrorism Act of 2020
#NasaanAngPangulo	Typhoons Goni (Rolly) and Vamco (Ulysses)
#DutertePalpak	COVID-19 pandemic in the Philippines
#DuterteDuwag	Territorial disputes in the South China Sea
#DuterteWakasan	Goals to oust Duterte from the office

== Injuries and arrests ==
Injuries
Date	Number of injuries	Ref.
March 24, 2017	1 (protester)	
November 12, 2017	9 (protesters)	
November 15, 2017	50 (police)	
July 4, 2021	5 (protesters)	
Total	65	

Arrests
Date	Number of arrests	Ref.
April 3, 2017	80	
July 21, 2017	8	
June 12, 2018	1	
April 1, 2020	21	
June 4, 2020	8	
June 26, 2020	20	
July 4, 2020	11	
July 27, 2020	34	
November 30, 2020	5	
February 25, 2021	1	
Total	189	

== Opposition accolades ==
Recipient	Category	Year	Ref.
Shibby de Guzman	30 Most Influential Teens (Time)	2017	
#BabaeAko movement	25 Most Influential People on the Internet (Time)	2018	

== See also ==
=== General ===
- Public image of Rodrigo Duterte
- Timeline of protests against Rodrigo Duterte
- People Power Revolution
- Second EDSA Revolution
- EDSA III
- 2015 Iglesia ni Cristo protests
- Burial of Ferdinand Marcos
- Million People March
- Demonstrations in support of Rodrigo Duterte
- 2017 Venezuelan protests (timeline)
- 2013–2019 Nicaraguan protests
- Euromaidan
- 2017–2018 Russian protests
- 2019–20 Hong Kong protests
- 2020-2021 Thai protests
- 2021 Myanmar protests

=== Protest against other presidents ===
- Protests against Bongbong Marcos
- Protests against Donald Trump (timeline)
- Protests against Emmanuel Macron
  - Yellow vests movement
