= Timeline of protests against Rodrigo Duterte =

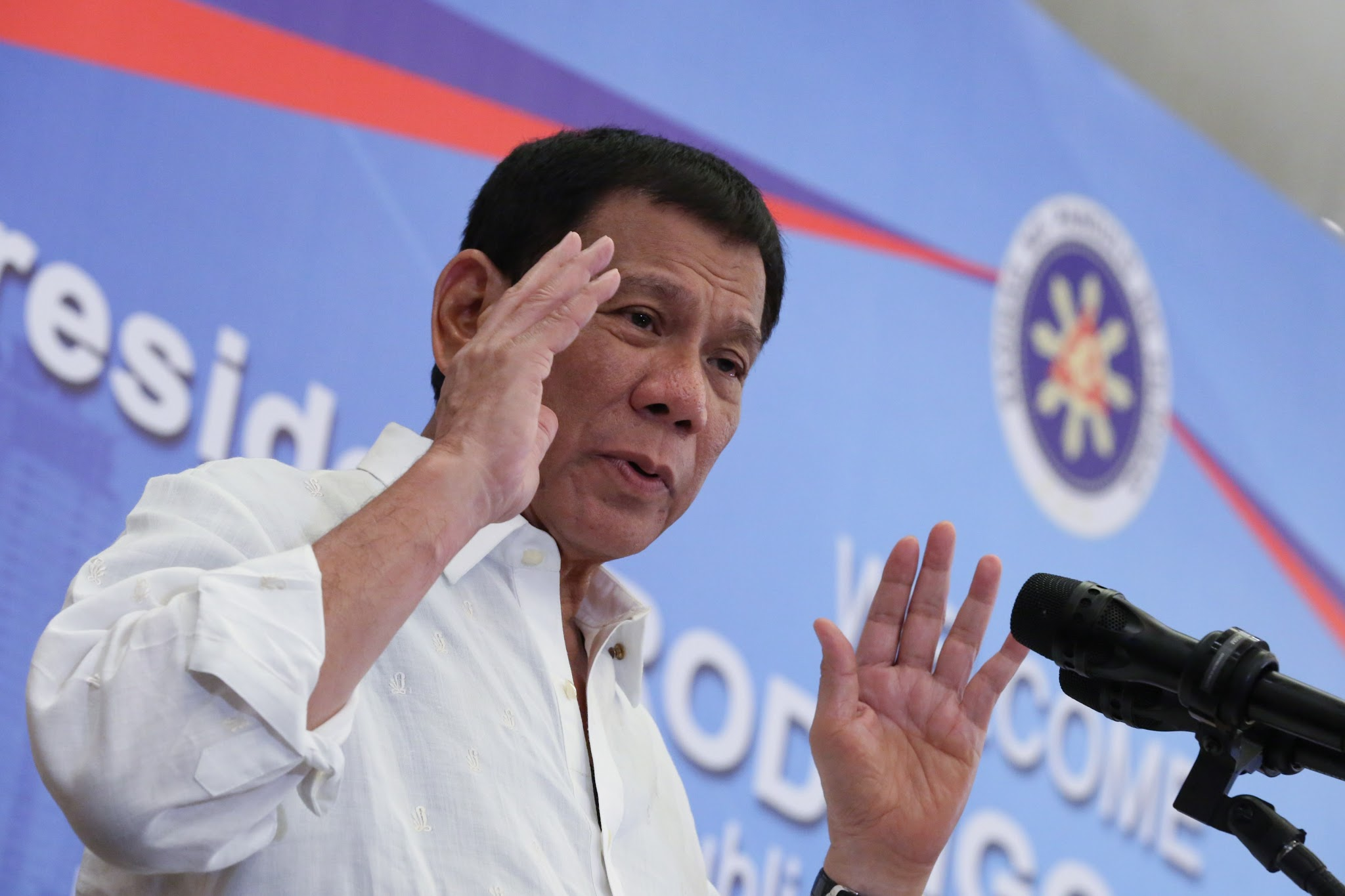
Rodrigo Duterte

The following is a timeline of protests against Rodrigo Duterte, the 16th President of the Philippines, and his policies. Issues were addressed in the protests including the war on drugs, employment issues, anti-terror law, and the government's response to the COVID-19 pandemic.

== 2016 ==
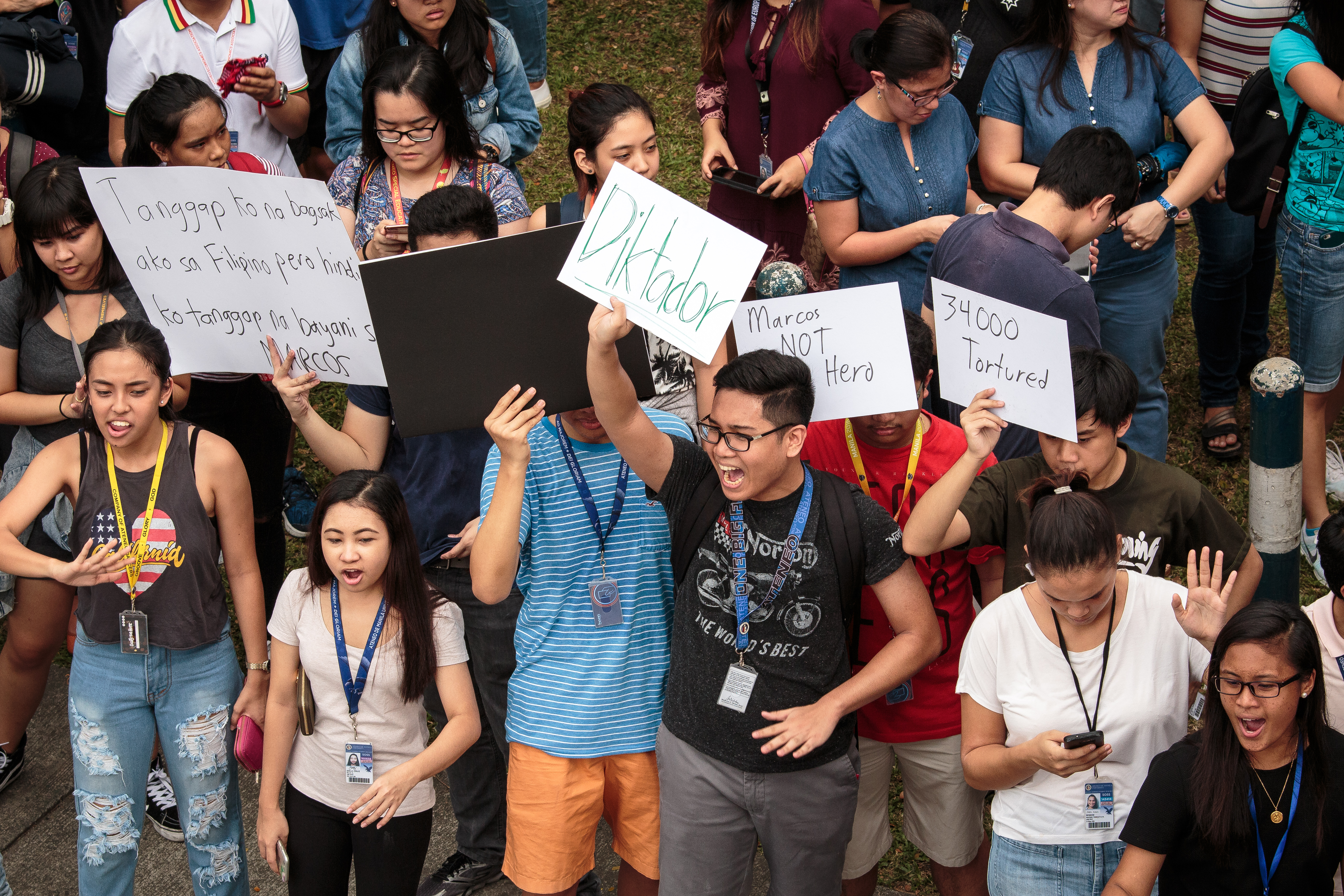
Students of the Ateneo de Manila University along Katipunan Avenue protesting against the burial of former President Marcos.

- August 24: Urban poor coalition Kalipunan ng Damayang Mahihirap (Kadamay) gathered in front of the Philippine National Police in Quezon City to protest Duterte and extrajudicial killings linked to the war on drugs.
- November 18–30: After late president and dictator Ferdinand Marcos was privately buried at the Heroes' Cemetery, a series of protests are organized by youths and militant groups, expressing their disappointment and rage against the burial and the Marcos family. They criticize Duterte for the rising number of killings in the war on drugs since his inauguration as president on June 30.
- December 11: Celebrating International Human Rights Day, militant groups marched to Mendiola Street in Manila. This is the first protest to feature a mixed effigy of Duterte, along with Ferdinand Marcos, and the United States flag.

== 2017 ==
=== January–June 2017 ===
- February 18: About thousands of Catholic people gathered in Manila, opposing the revival of the death penalty and calling for an end of killings amid Duterte's war on drugs.
- February 25: During the celebration of 31st anniversary of People Power Revolution, an altercation between APO Hiking Society musical group member and Duterte critic Jim Paredes and young pro-Duterte supporters was recorded on phone.
- March 8: A protest is organized by the Gabriela Women's Party in Manila as part of the International Women's Day celebrations.
- March 8 – April 4: A series of protests in Pandi, Bulacan organized by urban poor group Kalipunan ng Damayang Mahihirap (Kadamay) blames Duterte for the slow process of completing housing projects for the poor.
- April 5: Demonstrators stage protests against ASEAN Summit held in Cebu.
- April 28: Militant groups rallied in front of the US Embassy in Manila, "demanding the end of the Enhanced Defense Cooperation Agreement (EDCA) and withdrawal of US and Chinese military forces from the South China Sea."
- May 24: One day after Duterte declared martial law in Mindanao, various groups gather at Mendiola Street, Quezon City, and Quiapo, Manila, calling to revoke its declaration.
- May 29: Demonstrators gather at separate places across Metro Manila to protest martial law in Mindanao.
- June 30: Marking Duterte's first year in office, militant groups stage a protest against the war on drugs, martial law in Mindanao, and others, featuring the angry emojis for the said issue.

=== July–December 2017 ===
- July 2: Following the killings of suspected drug users in Caloocan, about 500 Catholics join the march to call for an end to extrajudicial killings. The Roman Catholic Diocese of Kalookan said that the killings are not the solution that will wipe out drug use in the country.
- July 18: Youth groups stage a protest at St. Scholastica's Manila, General Santos City, and Cebu City against Duterte's war on drugs.
- July 21: Eight people stage a flash protest during a Congress session on martial law; the protesters were arrested and detained by police.
- July 24: Several groups protest Duterte's second State of the Nation Address.
- August 18: Kabataan protests the continual killings under the Duterte administration.
- August 21: Protests were held at the People Power Monument and other parts of Metro Manila to condemn the killing of 17-year-old student Kian delos Santos during an anti-drug operation in Caloocan on August 16.
- September 7: Youth groups gathered in front of Camp Crame, the national headquarters of the Philippine National Police, calling for justice for young teenagers — especially Kian delos Santos, Carl Angelo Arnaiz, and Reynaldo de Guzman — killed in the drug war.
- September 8: Following the series of deaths among teenagers amid the war on drugs, about 700 protesters gathered at the University of the Philippines Diliman.
- September 11: Coinciding with what would have been the late former President Ferdinand Marcos's 100th birthday, protesters march towards the Heroes' Cemetery, where Marcos was buried ten months before.
- September 15: An effigy of Duterte, along with that of U.S. President Donald Trump, was displayed along the streets of Metro Manila.

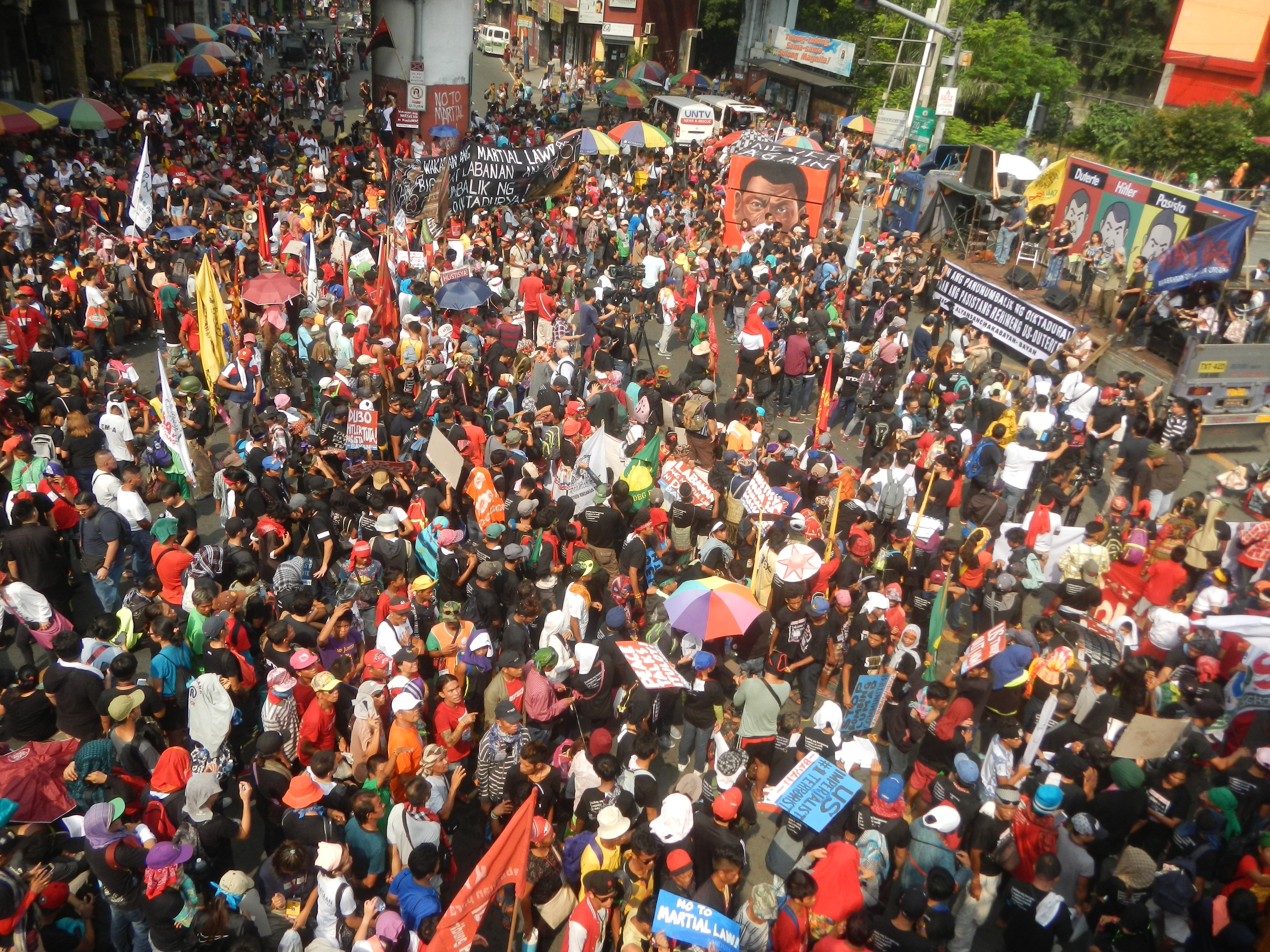
Anti-Duterte protesters at Mendiola Street.

- September 21: Also called as the "National Day of Protest", coinciding with the 45th anniversary of the declaration of martial law by former President Ferdinand Marcos, protests were held across Metro Manila.
- September 29: Student activists stormed the Polytechnic University of the Philippines (PUP) president's office. The students also accused PUP for being Duterte's "puppet".
- October 10: A group of farmers, led by former Agrarian Reform Secretary Rafael Mariano, protested the alleged killing of farmers and call for a stop to the ongoing martial law.
- October 14: Cause-oriented group Tindig Pilipinas launched a signature drive urging Duterte to sign a bank secrecy waiver to end doubts on his supposed unexplained wealth.
- October 16–17: Transport group Pinagkaisang Samahan ng mga Tsuper at Operators Nationwide (PISTON) conducted a nationwide protest against government plans to phase out jeepneys. Several other groups also conducted protests in various locations.
- October 19 - Led by Anakbayan, youth groups gathered at the seventh gate of Malacañang Palace, calling for justice for victims of alleged extrajudicial killings and militarization in parts of the country.
- October 23: About 500 farmers gathered at the Department of Agrarian Reform headquarters to protest the alleged killings of farmers, and calling for land reform.
- October 25: About thousands of farmers marched towards Mendiola Street.
- November 5: At an event called "Lord, Heal Our Land" led by Lingayen-Dagupan Archbishop Socrates Villegas, about thousands of critics of Duterte attend a mass held at the EDSA shrine. Tindig Pilipinas key people, Senator Antonio Trillanes and Representative Gary Alejano also attended the event.
- November 8: In Estancia, Iloilo, survivors of Typhoon Yolanda demanded for the justice for the victims of the disaster that struck in the area four years ago, and calling Duterte "useless" despite he was the mayor of Davao City at the time of the disaster.
- November 9–14: A series of protests erupted in Metro Manila against the visit of U.S. President Donald Trump.
- November 16: Peasants held a rally at the gate of the Hacienda Luisita to mark the 13th anniversary of Hacienda Luisita massacre. While the groups mainly targeted the Cojuangco-Aquino family, Duterte's name was also displayed on their streamers.
- November 24
  - On the eve of the International Day for the Elimination of Violence against Women, hundreds of women gathered at the Bantayog ng mga Bayani, the memorial of the people killed in the extrajudicial killings.
  - University of the Philippines Diliman launches an Oblation Run to protest the first year mark of the controversial burial of late Ferdinand Marcos.
- November 30: Both anti- and pro-Duterte gathered in separate places across Metro Manila to protest and support Duterte's proposed revolutionary government respectively.
- December 1: The Alpha Phi Omega fraternity of the University of the Philippines Diliman call for an end to drug-related killings and the resumption of peace talks between the government and communist rebels, which Duterte formally ceased on November 23.
- December 6
  - Militants protest at Camp Aguinaldo, worrying about the imminent crackdown against the rebellion, which Duterte declares the CPP–NPA–NDF as terrorist organization.
  - Evacuees from Mindanao arrived in Metro Manila to protest the extension of martial law.
- December 7: About hundreds of youths, led by Anakbayan and other groups, gathered along Mendiola Street to protest the series of killings and human rights abuses.
- December 11: Militant groups in Naga, Camarines Sur (the hometown of Vice President Leni Robredo), protest the killings in the country as part of the International Human Rights Day celebrations.
- December 13: Militants and students protest the extension of martial law.

== 2018 ==
=== January–April ===
- January 15: Protesters gathered at a market in Manila to call for the revocation of the Tax Reform for Acceleration and Inclusion Law (also known as the TRAIN Law).
- January 18: Students from University of the Philippines (UP) Diliman protested the Securities and Exchange Commission's (SEC) order to shut down the online news site Rappler. Protesters also condemned other government policies.
- January 19: The National Union of Journalists of the Philippines (NUJP) holds a protest at the 11th World Scout Jamboree Memorial Rotonda between Timog and Tomas Morato Avenue in Quezon City against the SEC's order to rescind Rappler's operating license. The protest, dubbed the "Black Friday Protest for Freedom", calls for freedom of the press in the administration.
- January 24: Transportation group PISTON holds a protest against the planned jeepney phaseout.
- January 25: Kadamay gathered at a market in Manila to protest against the TRAIN law.
- January 26
  - Gabriela holds a protest against the TRAIN law.
  - Several groups such as NUJP, Anakbayan, and UP Diliman hold a concert protesting the imminent closure of Rappler, the TRAIN law, human rights abuses, and other issues.

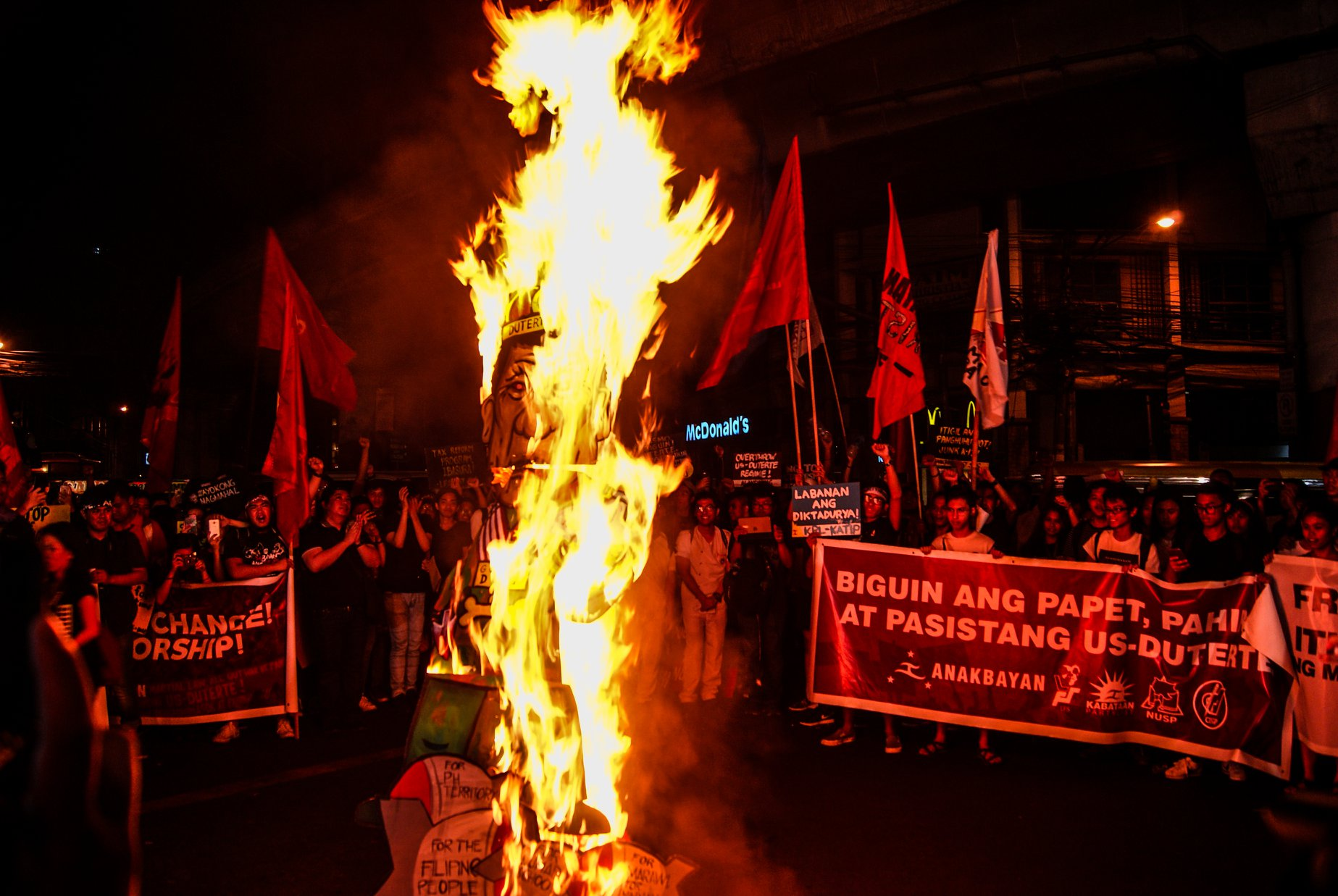
National Day of Walkout of youth groups from different schools and universities, February 23, 2018.

- February 1: Dubbed as "Pambansang Walkout" (English: "National Walkout"), students from various universities protest against the proposed constitutional reform (also known as "Charter Change" or "Cha-cha"), the imminent closure of Rappler, the TRAIN law, and other issues.
- February 8
  - Kadamay gathered at National Housing Authority headquarters.
  - Lumad groups and some students gathered at the Supreme Court to protest the extension of martial law in Mindanao.
  - Protesters gathered at the UP Diliman against the jeepney phaseout and tax reform.
- February 9: UP Diliman students burned the joint flags of the United States and China with the picture of Duterte on it.
- February 15: Kabataan held a protest after some universities continued to collect tuition fees despite the passage of Republic Act No. 10931 making tertiary education free. Student activists blamed Duterte for the government's failure to implement the law.
- February 17: Celebrating the anniversary of Gomburza martyrdom, protesters gathered at People Power Monument in White Plains, Quezon City against "Charter Change". The families of alleged victims of extrajudicial killings also marched towards Luneta.
- February 19: PISTON and other transport coalition called No To Jeepney Phase Out Coalition (NTJPOC) held protest against the jeepney phase out and the TRAIN Law.
- February 21: A prayer rally was held at the People Power Monument.
- February 22: Groups gathered at People Power Monument to hold a prayer vigil late at night showing their opposition to the proposed Charter change.
- February 23: About thousands of students from different universities walk out their classes to protest the ongoing martial law in Mindanao, human rights abuses, and others. Protesters burned an effigy of Duterte.
- February 24
  - Manila Archbishop Luis Antonio Tagle and Auxiliary Bishop Broderick Pabillo led "Walk for Life" at the Quirino Grandstand and other parts of the country.
  - About 1,300 protesters gathered at the People Power Monument to protest the proposed charter change.
- February 25: Thousands of protesters, opposing plans for charter change and various administration policies, gathered at the People Power Monument to mark the 32nd anniversary of the People Power Revolution. Also, supporters of Duterte joined the march, supporting the federalism.
- February 26: Kadamay protested the lack of electric and water supplies in the houses that they had occupied in Pandi.
- March 8: Women's groups held a protest as part of the International Women's Day celebration.
- March 14: PISTON demonstrated against the jeepney modernization program, announcing its plans for a transport strike on March 19.
- March 15
  - A series of protests against endo contractualization were held in Cebu, Bacolod, and Manila.
  - Youth groups led by Kabataan held a rally at the gate of Commission on Higher Education to protest against guidelines issued by the agency requiring poor students to work in exchange for free tuition.
- March 19: PISTON held a protest against the jeepney modernization program, which drivers say would lead to the loss of livelihoods. As a result, jeepney operators had to work early in the morning to avoid inconvenience.
- April 10: Local and national groups in Baguio rally against the quo warranto petition filed by Solicitor General Jose Calida against Sereno. Meanwhile, few anti-Sereno protesters also flock.
- April 16: Militants rally in front of the Department of Labor and Employment headquarters, calling to end the practice of endo contractualization.
- April 17
  - Workers and priests urged Duterte to sign the Executive Order ending contractualization. Meanwhile, various groups staged protests in Manila, Pasay, and Quezon City.
  - Supporters of Australian missionary Sister Patricia Fox stormed the front of the Bureau of Immigration office. Immigration officers arrested Fox the previous day for allegedly joining an anti-government protest.
- April 18: Groups of farmers rallied in front of the National Food Authority headquarters for its lack of a permanent solution to the rice crisis.
- April 27: Labor groups gathered at a forum to discuss the Duterte's failure to sign an EO ending contractualization. The groups also announced plans for Labor Day protests that will be held at Mendiola.

=== May–August 2018 ===
- May 1: Protests are held about the Executive Order on "endo" with Duterte's effigies. Duterte signed the executive order ending the contractualization, only to be dismayed by the labor groups when what Duterte signed is about for the employers not the workers.
- May 7: Health workers march to protest the low salary and contractualization.
- May 11: Supporters flock to the Supreme Court where Sereno is scheduled to face her colleagues for the vote on the quo warranto petition against her. She was then ousted in an 8–6 vote.
- May 12: Few students protest the removal of Sereno. One of the students showed a picture depicting Duterte as Thanos.
- May 15: Protesters, including activist priest Robert Reyes, displayed a coffin with pictures of eight justices that voted to oust Sereno, in front of the closed SC front gate.
- May 18: Students protest the ousting of Sereno and other administration issues (from war on drugs to martial law), and distributes flyers, criticizing the Supreme Court vote on the quo warranto petition, to motorists and pedestrians.
- May 21: Several groups gathered at the gas stations to protest the continuous increase of oil prices attributed by the TRAIN law.
- May 23: Coinciding the first anniversary of Marawi crisis, several groups march toward Mendiola and call for an end of martial law.
- May 24: A group called "Stop Train Coalition" launched the signature campaign to junk the TRAIN Law that needed at least 1,000 signatures.
- May 25: Gabriela and Anakbayan gathered at the tricycle terminal and Divisoria to call to stop the TRAIN Law.
- May 29: Kilusang Mayo Uno protests against the TRAIN law.
- May 30: Factory workers from Southern Tagalog arrive in Manila to protest, mocking the theme of Flores de Mayo, the "endo" in the country, featuring the life-size effigies of Duterte.
- June 1: Protests against the TRAIN Law held at Commonwealth Ave., Quezon City.
- June 4: On the first day of opening classes for school year 2018–2019, progressive groups, teachers and students held the protests against the TRAIN Law at Mendiola and also calling for wage increase. They also condemned Duterte for kissing a Filipina woman, who was revealed to be married, in his South Korea visit a day earlier.
- June 12
  - Less than 10 demonstrators interrupt Duterte's Independence Day speech in Kawit, Cavite by chanting "Hunyo a-dose, huwad na kalayaan! Pasista. Duterte, patalsikin!" (transl. "June twelve, fake freedom! Fascist. Oust Duterte!"). One of the demonstrators was arrested for "interrupting public order".
  - Protests, dubbed as "HINDIpendence Day", occurred in Cagayan de Oro with burning the flags of the United States and China. Meanwhile, in Metro Manila, both supporters and anti-Duterte demonstrators gathered at Liwasang Bonifacio.
  - Militant groups flocked at the Chinese Consulate office in Makati City to protest the presence of Chinese troops in the Philippine seas.
- June 15: Several groups held a protest against TRAIN Law.
- June 21: Several members from the Catholic Church protest the killings of the three priests (Marcelito Paez, Mark Ventura and Richmond Nilo). (Note: Richmond Nilo was the third priest to be killed in the last six months: Marcelito Paez was killed by the unidentified gunmen in Jaen, Nueva Ecija on December 4, 2017, Mark Ventura on April 29, 2018 in Gattaran, Cagayan, and Richmond Nilo was killed on June 10, 2018.)
- June 22
  - About 200 members of priests, nuns, and laity held a march to call for the justice of the slain three priests.
  - Gabriela condemn the apprehension of bystanders, known as "Oplan Tambay", and protest the TRAIN Law.
- June 25: In Albay, transport group Condor-PISTON held the strike against the TRAIN Law and the jeepney modernization program.
- June 27: Militant and religious groups protest against the "Oplan Tambay".
- June 29: Students from UP Diliman and University of Santo Tomas, and other militant groups protest against the policies of the Duterte administration.
- July 6: Members of Anakbayan gathered outside QCPD Station 4 to call for justice for Genesis Argoncillo, who was allegedly killed by the detainees following his arrest related to Oplan Tambay, by protest.
- July 7: Religious groups call for the justice of slain priests — Marcelito Paez, Mark Ventura and Richmond Nilo — and brought a coffin with the words "kalayaan" (freedom), "sovereignty," "EJK," "respect," and "PCGG" (Presidential Commission on Good Government) written on it.
- July 17: Demonstrators from Southern Tagalog begins a seven-day walk to Metro Manila.
- July 20: Public school teachers in Bacolod City staged a rally, calling for salary increase.
- July 22: Church leaders and opposition figures—such as Senators Antonio Trillanes IV, Risa Hontiveros, and Bam Aquino—gathered at the University of the Philippines in Diliman to oppose Charter change.
- July 23: Different groups coalitions and organizations held a nationwide protests on the day of Duterte's third State of the Nation Address.
- August 17: Progressive groups protest against inflation due to the TRAIN Law.
- August 27: Protests were held on National Heroes Day.
- August 28: Families of drug war victims, along with Bayan Muna Representative Neri Colmenares, filed the complaint to the ICC against Duterte for crimes against humanity.

=== September–December 2018 ===
- September 3: Youth groups protests against the extension of Martial Law in Mindanao.
- September 6
  - Members of Tindig Pilipinas gathered outside the Supreme Court to show support to Sen. Antonio Trillanes, following the revocation of his amnesty by President Duterte.
  - Students from UP Diliman walk out their classes to protests against the Martial Law in Mindanao and other administration policies.
- September 11: Marking what would have been the 101st birthday of Ferdinand Marcos, several groups held a rally at the gate of the Libingan ng mga Bayani.
- September 20: Several groups held protest on the eve of the 46th anniversary of the declaration of Martial Law. Senator Risa Hontiveros and Representative Tom Villarin are also present at the event.

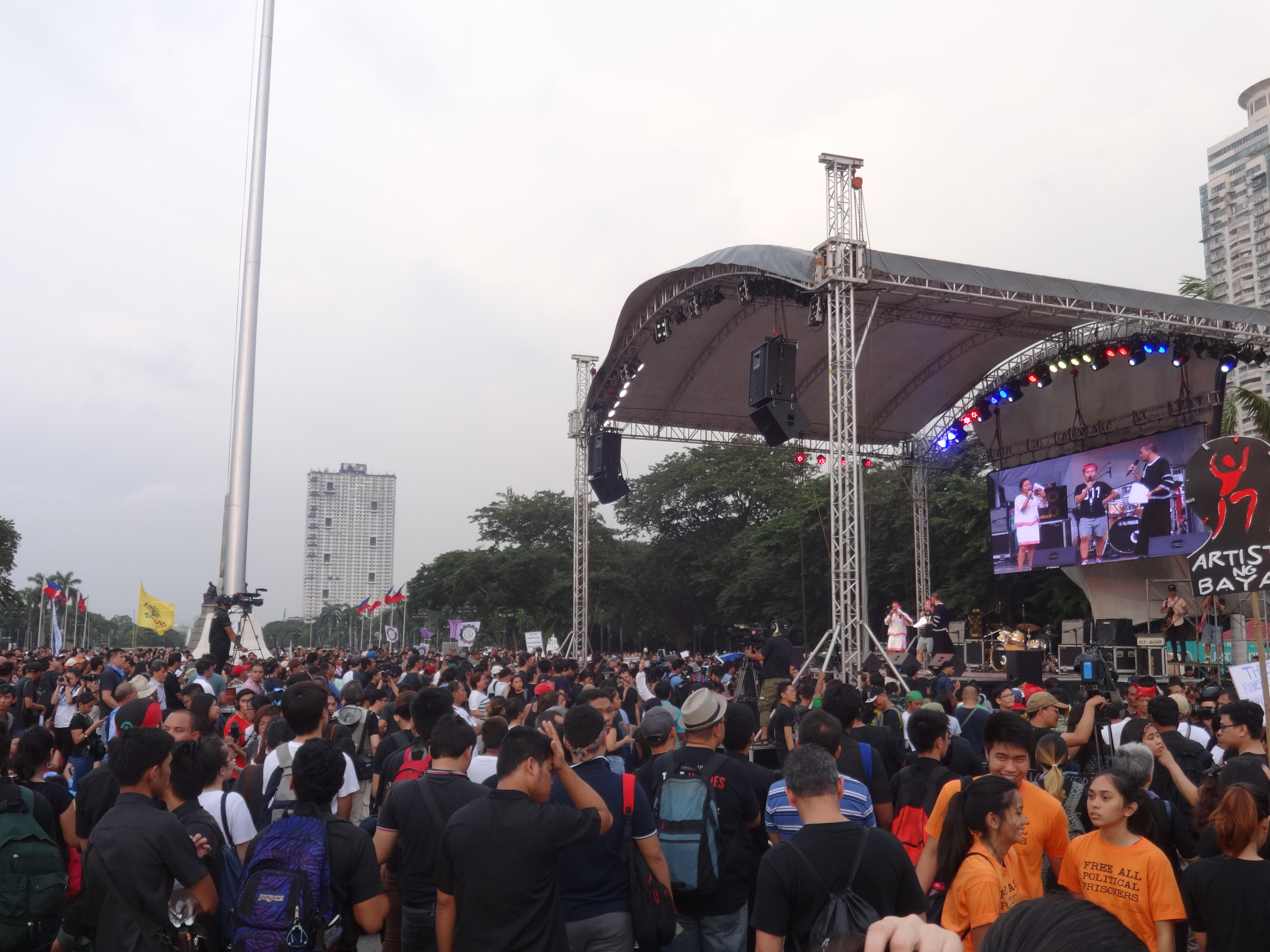
Protesters at the Luneta Park, September 21, 2017.

- September 21: Nationwide protests are conducted, coinciding the 46th anniversary of the declaration of Martial Law.
- October 2: UP Diliman stage a protests after being included in the "Red October" plot.
- October 25: Militant groups gathered at Taft Avenue in Metro Manila following the killing of nine farmers in Sagay, Negros Occidental five days earlier.
- November 2: Relatives of forced disappearances (desaparecidos)gathered in front of the Quiapo Church. Only six have been recorded missing under the Duterte administration at this point.
- November 7: Few law students from UP Diliman protests for the killing of human rights lawyer Benjamin Ramos.
- November 8: Marking the 5th year mark of Typhoon Yolanda disaster, the survivors protest its slow rehabilitation and also displayed the caricatures of President Duterte (who was the Mayor of Davao City at the time) and former President Benigno Aquino III.
- November 19: The arrival of Chinese President Xi Jinping on his state visit in the country was met by the protests in Makati.
- November 21: After the state visit of Chinese President Xi in the country, militant groups burned the flag of China and the United States and protested the intervention of American and Chinese troops in the territories of the Philippine seas.
- November 28: Labor groups demonstrate, hitting the Sumifru Philippines Corporation for alleged killing of one of the workers.

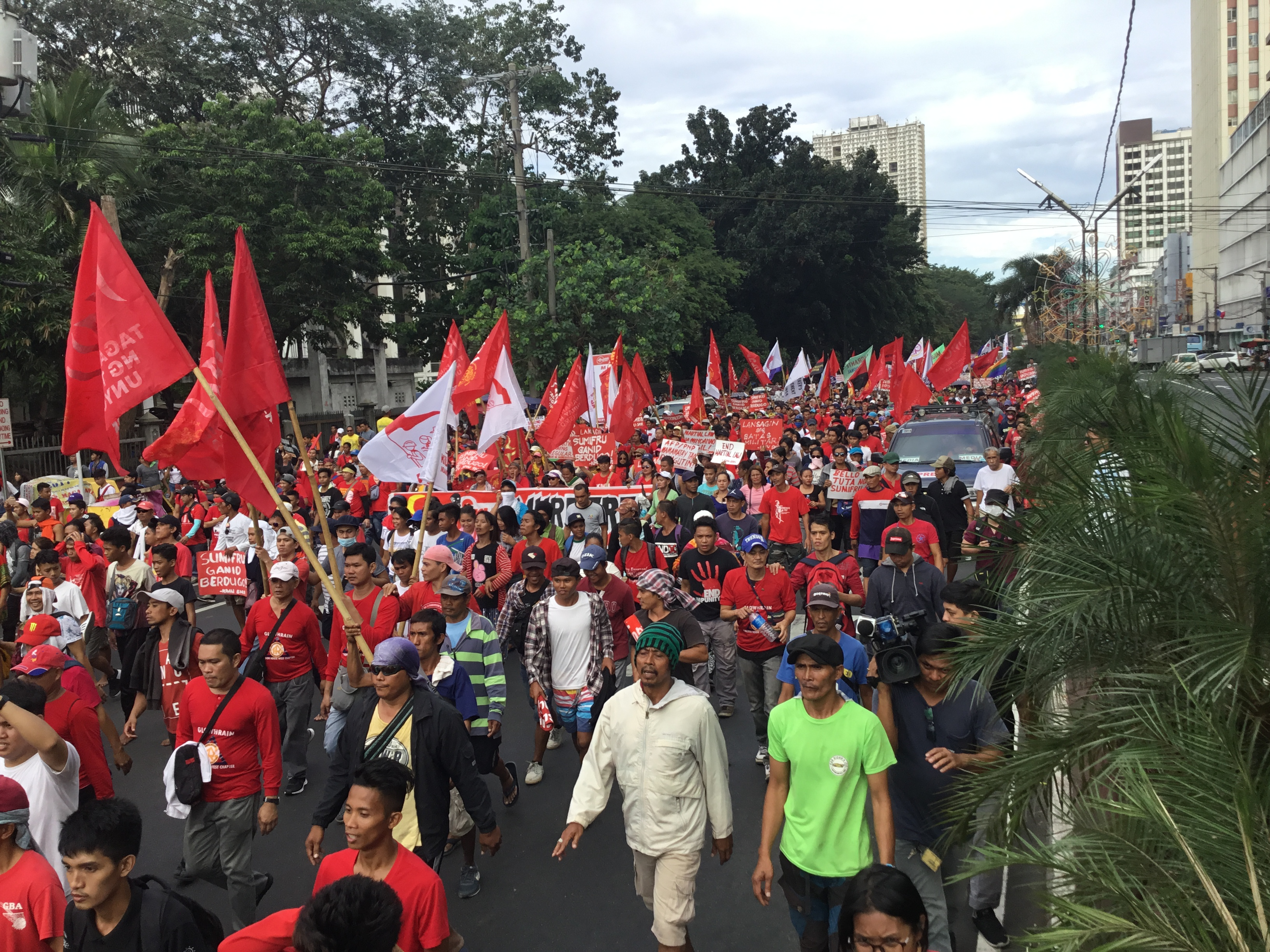
Demonstrations on November 30, 2018

- November 30: Militant groups demonstrate at Mendiola, featuring Duterte's effigies and some include Chinese President Xi and US President Trump, mainly due to employment issues, and "increasing numbers of illegal workers from China."
- December 12: Demonstrators from Mindanao gathered outside the House of Representatives to protests the third extension of martial law.

== 2019 ==
=== January–June 2019 ===
- January 4: Bagong Alyansang Makabayan gathered at the PNP headquarters to condemn the alleged human rights violation committed by PNP and AFP.
- January 15: Few students from University of the Philippines Diliman and Polytechnic University of the Philippines protests against the PNP's statement about the students using the "immersion program" to recruit the New People's Army (NPA).
- January 21: Few demonstrators protest against the lowering of age of criminal responsibility.
- January 22: Demonstrators marked the 32nd anniversary of 1987 Mendiola massacre. Despite it occurred during Corazon Aquino administration, Duterte's name can be seen written on their placard or banner.
- January 25: Thousand of Catholics held a march to protest Dutere's statements against the church, and the lowering of age of criminal responsibility.
- January 26: At least 50 members of Lumad youth groups staged protests at the gate of the House of Representatives to condemn the ongoing martial law.
- February 7: Students marched towards the headquarters of Commission on Higher Education (CHED), opposing for tuition hike while vandalizing the headquarters' gate.
- February 14: UP Diliman students held a rally, condemning the arrest of Rappler CEO Maria Ressa.
- February 23–25: Opposition figures gathered at the EDSA to celebrate the 33rd anniversary of People Power Revolution.
- February 26: Anakbayan held a protest to condemn the oil price hike at Mendiola.
- March 7: Few activists from Kabataan condemned the "red-tagging and attacks on the youth."
- March 8: Women groups held a protest as part of the International Women's Day.
- March 15
  - Militant groups gathered in front of the National Housing Authority, demanding the efficient water supply.
  - Relatives of lost loved ones in the drug war campaign gathered at Christ the King seminary in Quezon City for prayer.
- March 27: Youth Resist held a protest a day before Duterte's 74th birthday to condemn the killings of the 74 teenagers during the war on drugs.
- April 2
  - Anakpawis and Kilusang Magbubukid ng Pilipinas gathered at the PNP headquarters following the killings of 14 people, whom the groups said that they are merely the farmers, during the police operations in Negros Oriental.
  - UP Diliman held a torch parade to condemn the attacks against the press.
- April 4: Farmer groups held a rally in front of the Department of Agriculture headquarters.
- April 8: Otso Diretso senatorial candidates Florin Hilbay; Chel Diokno; Samira Gutoc and Gary Alejano, along with Tindig Pilipinas, attempted to reach Scarborough Shoal, where the reported harassment against Filipino fishermen is occurred, but they failed. Instead, the candidates waved their Philippine flag at the shore and dared President Duterte to fulfill his 2016 presidential campaign promise "to ride a jetski" into the disputed territory.
- April 9: Otso Diretso and other groups marched towards the Chinese Embassy in Makati City.
- April 15: Militants staged a protest in front of Camp Sergio Osmeña Sr., condemning the Negros Oriental killings.
- April 17: Anakpawis gathered at the Camp Crame to protest the issues in the country such as Rice Tariffication Law, the TRAIN law, and the war against drugs.
- April 25: Akbayan party-list rallied in front of the Department of Foreign Affairs, and demanded Duterte "to open to the public all agreements made with China" during the visitation of Duterte in Beijing to attend the "Belt and Road Forum."
- May 1: Labor groups organized the rally as part of Labor Day.

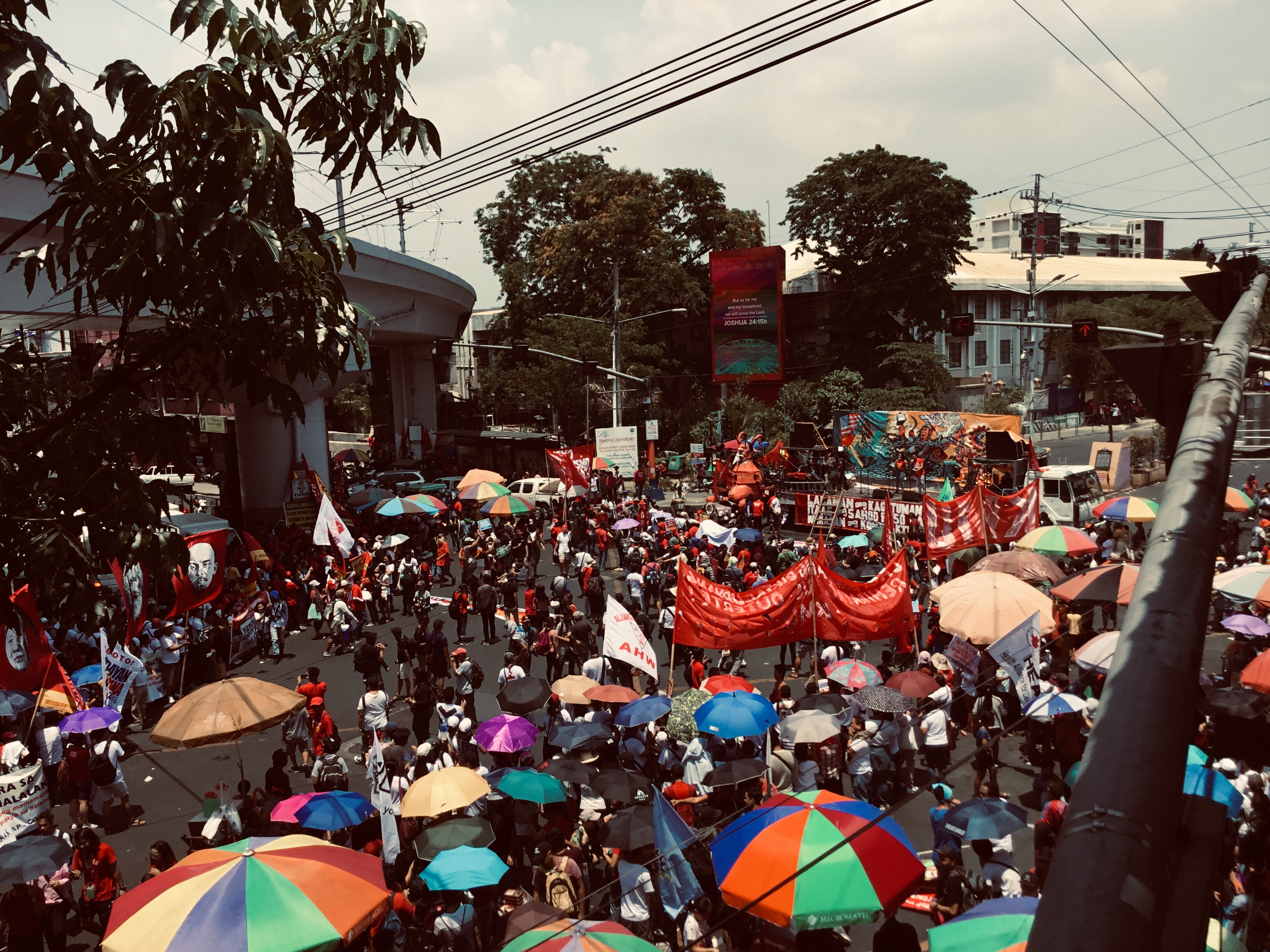
May 1 protests

- May 3: Human rights groups gathered at Camp Aguinaldo to protest the attacks of the government against the media.
- May 14: Kabataan gathered at the office of the Commission on Elections (COMELEC) to protest the alleged electoral fraud.
- May 23: Various militant groups protested against the ongoing martial law in Mindanao.
- June 4: Militants led by former Social Welfare Secretary Dinky Soliman held a protest in front of Senate against the alleged cheating on the May 13 elections.

=== July–December 2019 ===
- July 9: Akbayan and other groups marched to Mendiola to protest and condemn the invasion by China to the Philippine sovereignty and also desired to file an impeachment complaint against Duterte for "allowing China to fish in the exclusive economic zone (EEZ) in the West Philippine Sea."
- July 15
  - PISTON and ACTO gathered at the Land Transportation Franchising and Regulatory Board (LTFRB) headquarters to oppose the jeepney modernization program.
  - Various activists slammed Duterte as a "diversion" from the recent issues "such as intensified foreign aggression by China and alleged human rights abuses directed at the poor and student organizations."
- July 17: Relatives of victims of alleged extrajudicial killings and human rights advocates gathered at the PNP headquarters, calling the government to stop the war on drugs campaign.
- July 22: Various several groups held a rally re Duterte's fourth State of the Nation Address.
- July 30: Labor groups hit Duterte for vetoing the anti-endo bill.
- August 13: The Student Christian Movement of the Philippines (SCMP) University of Santo Tomas chapter, together with other local groups, launched a protest outside the university condemning the worsening violence in the country, especially in the wake of Negros peasant killings. Lynus Del Mar, chapter Spokesperson said that "God does not want a country of killings where justice is not recognized".
- August 20: UP Diliman students walked out their classes to protests the military intervention in their campuses and other administration policies.
- August 23: Protests against the impending release of Antonio Sanchez, the perpetrator of the Murders of Eileen Sarmenta and Allan Gomez in June 1993, from the prison were organized by University of the Philippines Los Baños, where the mother of Allan Gomez is present, and Gabriela. The students also hit Duterte through their placards, despite Duterte opposes the release of Sanchez.
- August 26: Workers marched towards the streets in Manila to protest the government's failure to end the "endo".
- September 12: Church leaders and peace groups called the government for the resumption of peace talks.
- September 13: LGBT groups gathered at the UP Diliman to demand the passage of SOGIE Equality Bill.
- September 20–21: Demonstrators held the protests to remember the 47th anniversary of the declaration of Martial Law.
- September 30: Transport groups held a nationwide strike to protests against the jeepney modernization program.
- October 30: Relatives of alleged extrajudicial killings, whose faces were covered by the white mask, gathered at the Mendiola.

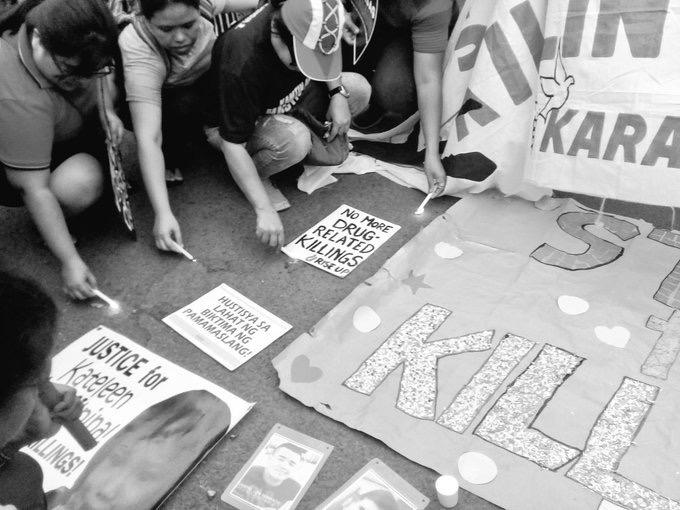
Relatives of drug war and alleged extrajudicial killings victims light the candles to remember the victims.

- November 30: Various groups nationwide staged the protests on Bonifacio Day with the caricatures of Duterte, along with President Donald Trump and Chinese President Xi Jinping, were shown.
- December 11: Human rights advocates held a rally in celebration of International Human Rights Day. They also featured Duterte's effigy, as well as the artwork of Trump-Duterte.

== 2020 ==
=== January–June ===
- January 10: Militant groups gathered outside the Department of Foreign Affairs (DFA) headquarters to protest the deployment of Filipino troops to the Middle East, following the escalated tension between Iran and the U.S. after the US airstrike that killed Iranian general Qasem Soleimani on January 3, 2020. DFA Secretary Teodoro Locsin confronts the protesters who refused to give him the microphone to speak.
- February 1: During the COVID-19 pandemic, Kadamay held a rally to protest the alleged "criminal negligence" of Duterte for the entry of SARS-CoV-2 to the country.
- February 4: Anakbayan gathered at the Philippine General Hospital to protest the government's lack of action to prevent the novel coronavirus from spreading in the country.
- February 14: Demonstrators gathered to protests the impending closure of ABS-CBN, whose license to operate would eventually expire on May 4, 2020.
- February 22: Demonstrators gathered at the People Power Monument to protest the "allowing the China to breach the Philippine sovereignty" and calling Duterte to resign from office.
- February 25: Several demonstrators held a rally as part of 34th anniversary of the People Power Revolution.
- March 3: Protests against anti-terror bill were held in front of the House of the Representatives.
- April 1: Twenty-one protesters who were demanding food and other assistance were arrested in Quezon City for staging a rally without government permit.
- May 8: Several groups gathered at the University of the Philippines Diliman in Quezon City to protest the shutdown of ABS-CBN.
- June 3, 4, 12: Various groups gathered at the University of the Philippines to protest and call for the junking of the Anti-Terrorism Act of 2020, which was approved by the House of Representatives.
- June 26: LGBT groups marched towards Mendiola Street in Manila to protest the Anti-Terror bill. At least 20 people, including two drivers who offered rides to protesters, were arrested but no formal charges have been filed against them.
- June 30: Protesters held a rally to mark the 4th year of presidency of Duterte.

=== July–December ===
- July 4: A day after Duterte signed the controversial Anti-Terror bill, protesters gathered at UP Diliman to condemn it. Meanwhile, in Cabuyao, Laguna, 11 activists were arrested by the authorities.
- July 7: Protesters gathered at UP Diliman against the Anti-Terror bill.
- July 13–28 (main phase): A series of noise barrages was held outside ABS-CBN News to show support of the network and protest against the government's rejection of the network's franchise application.
- July 27: Several demonstrators held a rally, dubbed as "#SONAgKAISA", on the day of Duterte's 5th State of the Nation Address.

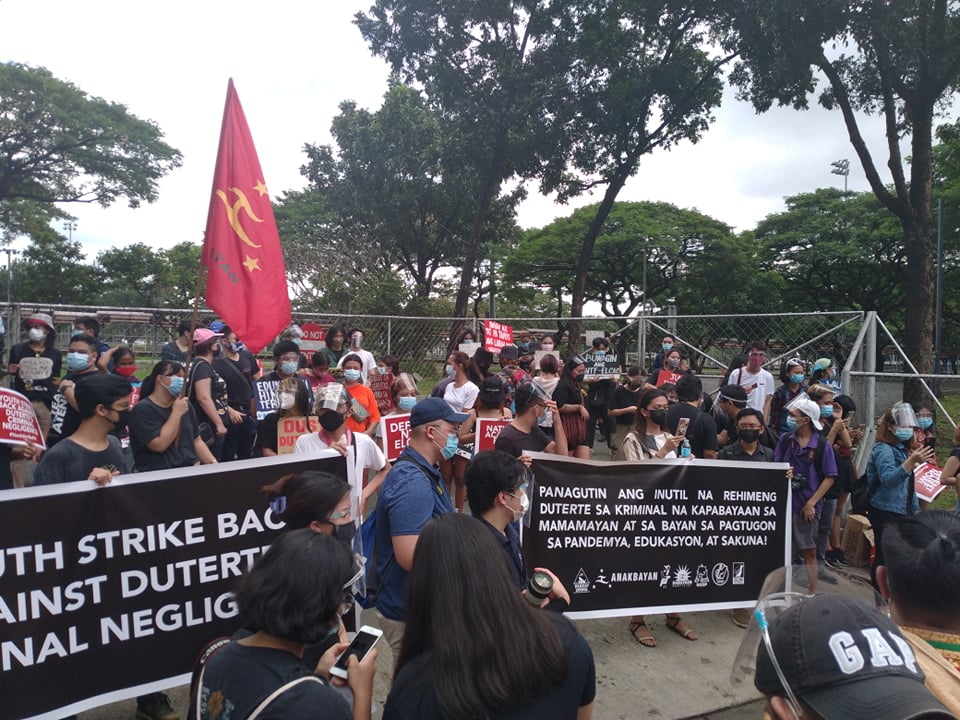
Youth Strike, November 17, 2020, in front of Ateneo de Manila University.

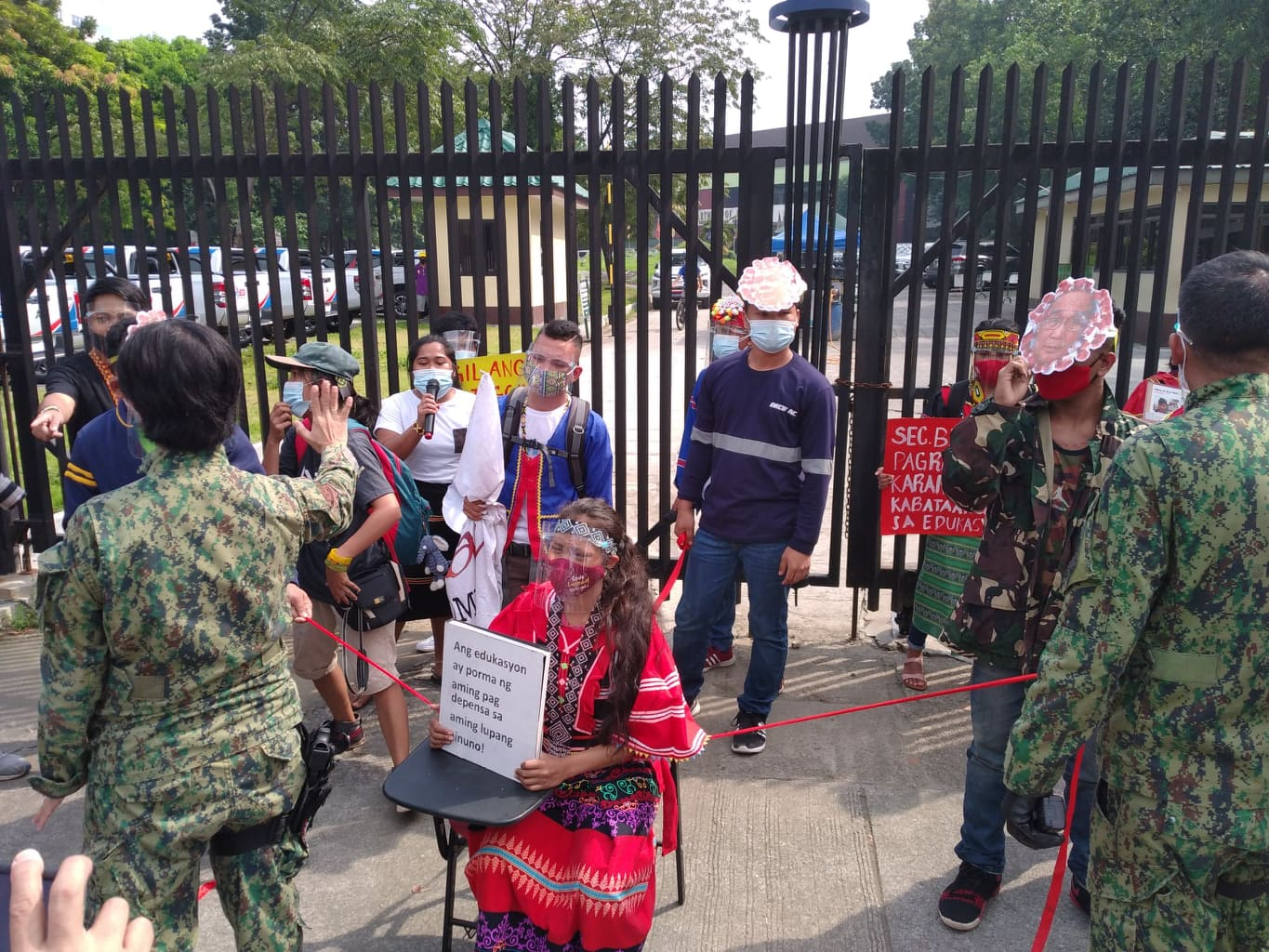
On December 3, Lumad students protested in front of Department of Education against the closure of their schools amid the pandemic. Policemen tried to stop the program.

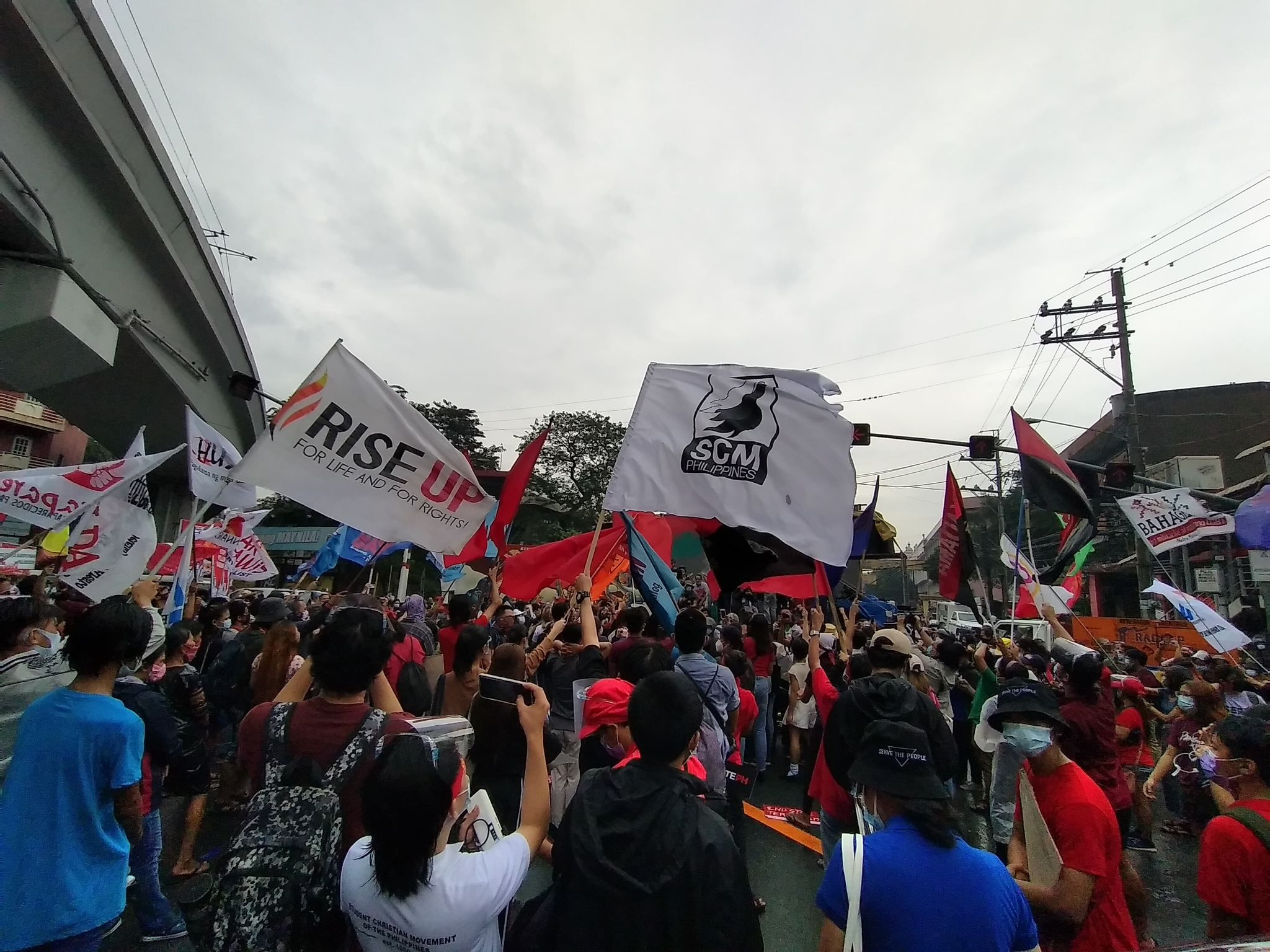
International Human Rights Day protest, December 10, 2020.

- August 25: Some jeepney drivers and youths held a protest in front of the headquarters of Land Transportation Office (LTO).
- August 31: Groups held a rally in front of the ABS-CBN headquarters to show solidarity for the network and also tore off the pictures of the 70 Congress members who voted against the network's renewal.
- September 11:
  - Several LGBT communities held a rally to protest Duterte's absolute pardon of Joseph Scott Pemberton, who was convicted of killing LGBT trans woman Jennifer Laude in October 2014.
  - Anakbayan held a protest on the birthday of Ferdinand Marcos.
- September 21: Several demonstrators held a rally as part of the Martial Law anniversary.
- October 5: ACT Teachers held a rally on Mendiola Street on the opening day of classes for school year 2020–2021 (after the Department of Education postponed the opening of classes in June due to the COVID-19 pandemic) and as part of World Teachers' Day.
- October 6: Demonstrators, led by Anakbayan, held a rally on Blumentritt in Manila to protest the alleged failed education program by the Department of Education and the Commission on Higher Education (CHED) under the administration of Duterte.
- October 16: Protesters condemned the death of 3-month old River Nasino, daughter of human rights worker Reina Mae Nasino.
- October 21: Demonstrators held a protest rally on a Mendiola Street with Duterte's effigy.
- November 10: Groups held a rally at the headquarters of Department of Education in Pasig to demand the return of face-to-face classes as soon as possible.
- November 17, 20: Students from Ateneo de Manila University, on November 14, 2020, initiated an academic "Youth Strike" demanding Duterte to step down if he did not heed the demands of the strike. The strike criticized the national government response to COVID-19, disaster response after Typhoon Ulysses, and the condition of education and the studentry amid the pandemic. Protests by students from various universities and colleges followed, and was translated into a physical protest on November 17, 2020.
- November 30: A rally was held in Manila to condemn red-tagging and the anti-terror law.
- December 3: Lumad students protested in front of the Department of Education against the closure of Lumad schools amid the pandemic.
- December 4: Demonstrators and human rights group protested in front of the DILG office in Quezon City on the second anniversary of the executive order that created the NTF-ELCAC.

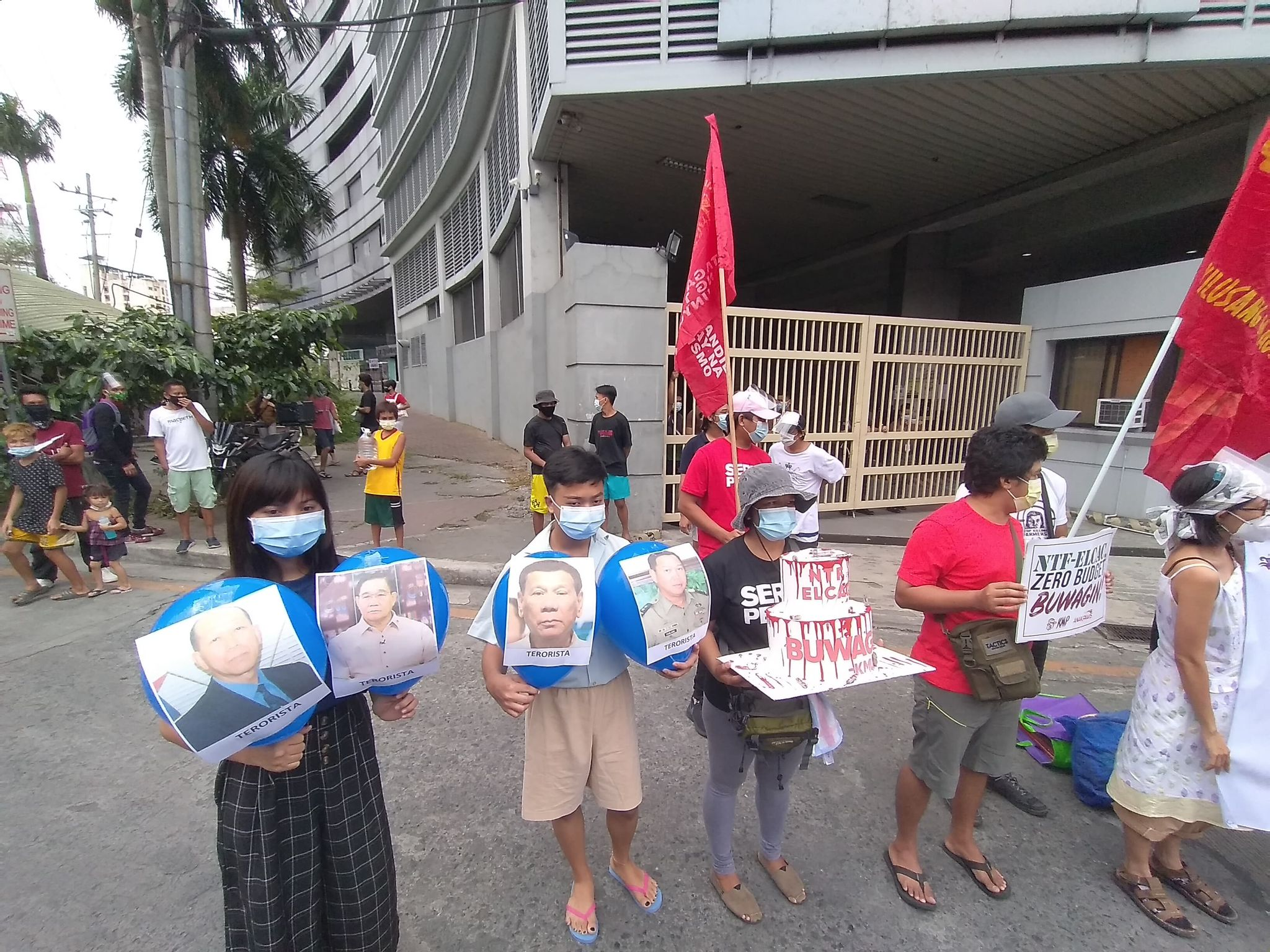
Protesters demanding the abolish of NTF-ELCAC on December 4, 2020

- December 10: Several groups held a rally as part of International Human Rights Day with effigies of Duterte.
- December 21
  - A protest was held to release the seven activists arrested on December 10, as well as all political prisoners.
  - Media advocates and activists held a rally in front of Mandaluyong RTC Branch 213 to release activists imprisoned on December 10, including journalist Lady Ann Salem.
  - Because of a shooting incident in Tarlac a day before, an indignation rally was done by numerous groups on December 21, 2020, at the Boy Scout Circle, Quezon City.
- December 31: An indignation rally was held on the grounds of Commission on Human Rights in Quezon City because of the killing of 9 Tumandok in Capiz and the killing of one farmer in Bohol on December 30.

== 2021 ==
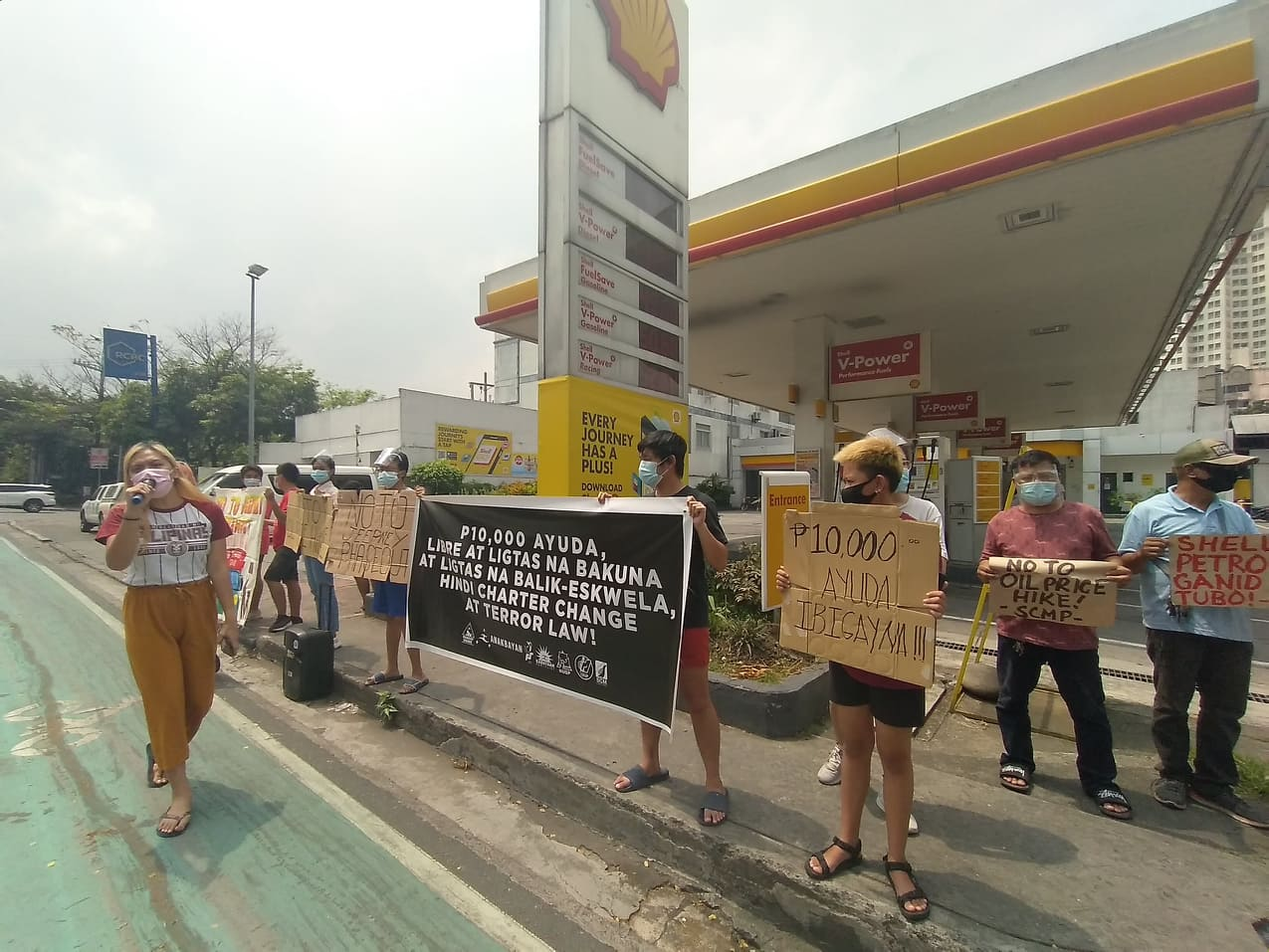
March 20 protest of youth and transport groups.

=== January–June 2021 ===
- January 13: Students from various universities held a rally to protest charter change and the delay of the arrival of the COVID-19 vaccine in the country.
- January 19: University of the Philippines held a rally to condemn the termination of the 1989 UP–DND accord, the agreement limiting the presence of military and police at the university.
- January 22: Several groups held a rally to mark the 34th anniversary of Mendiola massacre.
- January 25: Several groups held a rally to protest the proposed charter change.
- February 2 & 9: Protesters supporting and opposing the Anti-Terrorism Act of 2020 held a rally outside the Supreme Court.
- February 5: Progressive groups held a rally in front of Camp Crame to protest the interference by the AFP-PNP at the universities.
- February 16: Progressive groups held a rally in front of the Supreme Court during the oral arguments regarding the Anti-Terrorism Act.
- February 20: Demonstrators held a rally in Mendiola where police confiscated an effigy of Duterte.
- February 23: Pamalakaya held a rally at the Manila Baywalk to condemn the presence of Chinese coast guards in the Philippine waters.
- February 25: Several demonstrators held a rally as part of 35th anniversary of the People Power Revolution.
- March 1: Few protesters held a rally in front of the House of Representatives to oppose Charter Change.
- March 5: Youth protesters held a rally in front of the U.S. Embassy to condemn imperialism in the Philippines.
- March 8 & 12: Various groups held a protest to condemn the simultaneous raids in Calabarzon that resulted in the deaths of nine people.
- March 15: Gabriela and PISTON held a rally to protest the government response to the COVID-19 pandemic.
- March 17: Progressive groups held a rally in front of the CHR headquarters to condemn the government's handling of the COVID-19 pandemic.
- March 20: Transport and youth groups, together with SCMP called for economic aid and protested oil price hike and the planned jeepney phaseout amid the COVID-19 pandemic.
- April 24: Peasant members and other advocates biked to protest government's response to the COVID-19 pandemic.
- April 26: PISTON held a rally to demand the full resumption of transport operations, as jeepney drivers were affected by the COVID-19 pandemic.
- May 1: Labor Day protests were held by several groups on issues related to employment and the handling of the COVID-19 pandemic.
- May 7: Several groups gathered at the Chinese Embassy in Makati City to protest the territorial dispute in the West Philippine Sea.
- May 11 - Several groups gathered at the Commission on Human Rights to mourn and call for justice for peasant leader Joseph Canlas, who died from the complications of COVID-19 in detention on the same day. Canlas was arrested on March 30 for alleged possession firearms and grenades.
- May 18: Peasant group demonstrated in Quezon City to condemn government's "insufficient action to address hunger".
- May 30: Groups held a rally in front of the CHR headquarters in Quezon City to protest red-tagging, and calling for freeing the political prisoners.
- June 7: Youth protesters led by Anakbayan held a rally in front of Manila City Hall to protest the clearing operations of vendors and demolitions of the residential houses. Although they blamed the Manila government for this, they also included Duterte's name on their placards.
- June 9: Demonstrators held a protests in front of the Batasang Pambansa Complex where Congress held a hearing regarding the proposed Kaliwa Low Dam.
- June 12: Protesters held a rally on Independence Day regarding the West Philippine Sea territorial dispute.
- June 17: Various groups held a rally to condemn the killings of three Lumads in Lianga, Surigao del Sur, by state forces.
- June 30: Several groups held a rally on the day of the 5th-year mark of the Duterte presidency.

=== July–December 2021 ===
October 6 protest with burning of Duterte-Marcos effigy

- July 1: Relatives of victims of war on drugs held a protest, demanding to hold Duterte for the human rights violations.
- July 4: Progressive groups held a rally in front of the U.S. Embassy to call for the termination the Visiting Forces Agreement.
- July 6: Progressive groups held a rally in front of the Supreme Court to call for the repeal of the Anti-Terrorism Law.
- July 10: Several groups gathered at the gate of the ABS-CBN Corporation headquarters to mark the first year of the network shutdown.
- July 12: Marking the 5th anniversary of the South China Sea Arbitration, Akbayan and Pamalakaya, along with other groups, held a rally in front of the Chinese Embassy to condemn condemned Duterte's lack of action in relation to the dispute in the West Philippine Sea.
- July 16: Various groups held a rally in front of the Department of the Interior and Local Government-National Police Commission in Quezon City regarding the killings of the activists.
- July 19: Workers marched to the Department of Labor and Employment (DOLE) to condemn the employment issues regarding the endo contractualization.
- July 20: Progressive groups held a rally in front of the Department of Interior and Local Government (DILG) to condemn the "failed" response to the COVID-19 pandemic and human rights abuses.
- July 26: Different groups, coalitions, and organizations held protests on the day of Duterte's 5th and last State of the Nation Address.
- August 20: Akbayan held a protest to support the flagging of DOH by Commission on Audit (COA) for irregular expenses worth over P500 million, while condemning both Duterte and DOH secretary Francisco Duque through their placards.
- August 30, September 1: Health workers from various hospitals in Metro Manila held a protest over nonpayment of their salary and benefits and called for Duque to resign.
- August 31: A streamer read "Duterte, Duque, Alis Dyan!" (lit. 'Duterte, Duque, Go Away!') was installed on the overpass at Commonwealth Ave. in Quezon City.
- September 13:
  - On the day of opening classes for school year 2021–2022, Alliance of Concerned Teachers (ACT) held a rally to demand a return to safe face-to-face classes.
  - SCMP, together with other youth groups, also lead a protest at Mendiola, condemning Duterte's approach to COVID-19 pandemic. They also said that online distance learning amidst the pandemic received little aid from the national government. They urged the government for safe resumption of classes and the provision of ₱10,000 educational aid for students.
- September 18: A group called Gising Maharlika held a rally to demand the cessation of mandatory wearing of face mask and COVID-19 vaccine, believing that the deaths were attributed to the vaccine.
- September 20: Nuns and teachers held a rally at St. Scholastica's College in Malate, Manila, to condemn alleged corruption in government.
- September 21: Several demonstrators held a rally to mark the 49th anniversary of Martial Law.
- September 24: The Confederation for Unity, Recognition and Advancement of Government Employees held a rally in Quezon City to demand wage increases for employees of government-owned and controlled corporations.
- October 5: Alliance of Concerned Teachers held a rally as part of World Teachers' Day.
- October 6: Several groups gathered at the Commission on Human Rights (CHR) to condemn the 2022 presidential bid of Bongbong Marcos; the protest featured effigies of Bongbong's father Ferdinand and Duterte.
- October 16: Amihan National Federation of Peasant Women (AMIHAN) held a noise barrage at Nepa Q-Mart in Cubao as part of the World Food Day celebration.
- October 21: Peasants marched to Mendiola for land reform.
- October 29:
  - Katribu-Youth and other organizations held a protest as part of the 24th anniversary of the Indigenous Peoples Rights Act.
  - Families of drug war victims held a mass at the CHR.
- November 14: Protesters gathered in front of the CHR to oppose the presidential and vice-presidential bid of former Senator Bongbong Marcos and Davao City Mayor Sara Duterte respectively.
- November 18: UP Diliman students held a rally marking the 5th year of the burial of Ferdinand Marcos.
- November 24: Bayan Muna led by Neri Colmenares, Anakpawis and Pamalakaya held a protest in front of the Chinese consulate to condemn the water cannon attack by the Chinese Coast Guard to the Philippine boats.
- November 30: Demonstrations were held on the Bonifacio Day.
- December 10: Several groups held a rally as part of International Human Rights Day.
- December 14: Demonstrators protested against jeepney phaseout and oil price hike.

== 2022 ==
=== January–June 2022 ===
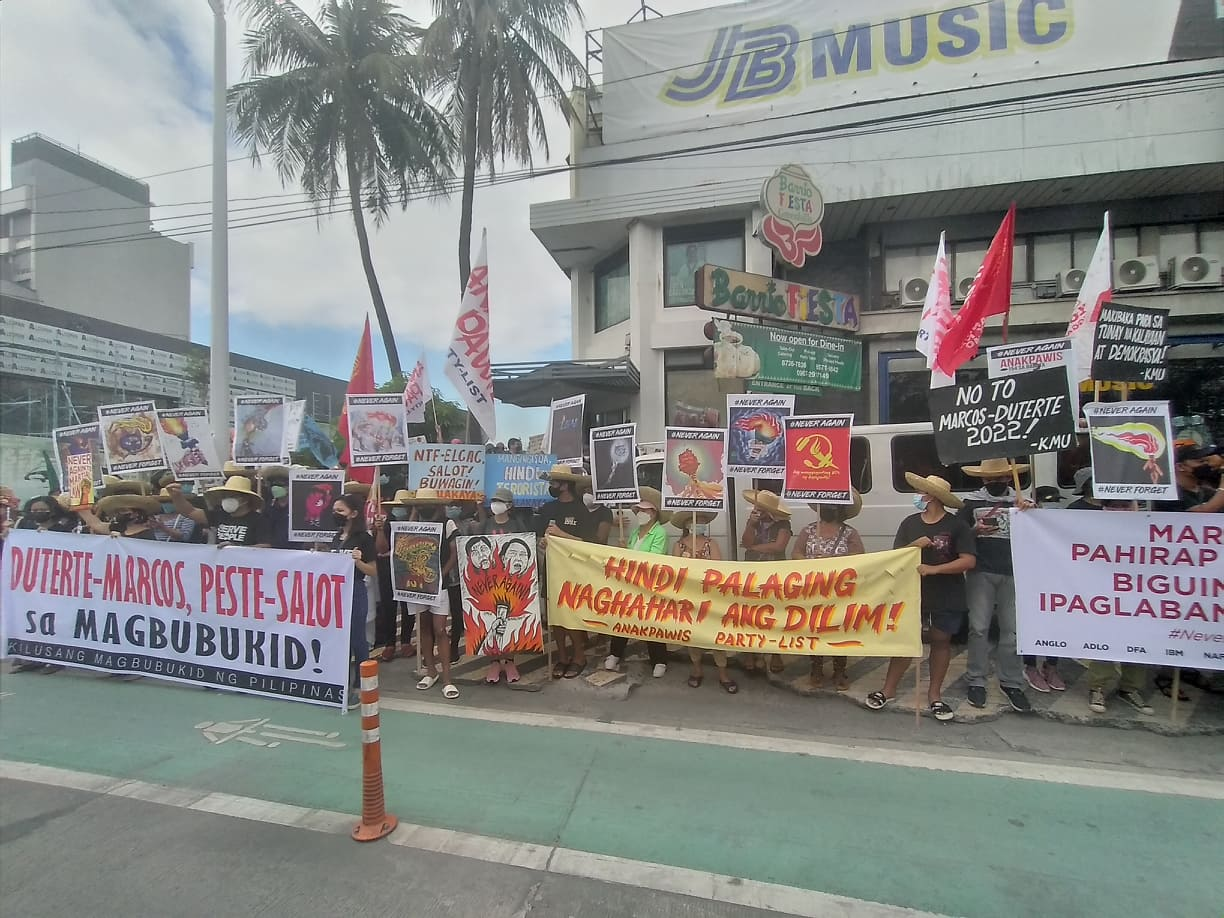
Mobilization on the 36th anniversary of EDSA People Power, February 25, 2022.

- January 22: Protesters commemorated the 35th anniversary of Mendiola Massacre in Cavite.
- February 26: Students in University of the Philippines Cebu protested in condemnation of the New Bataan massacre.

== Protests outside the Philippines ==
- August 25, 2017: Overseas Filipino groups from Saudi Arabia, London, Hong Kong, Canada, Italy, Australia, South Korea, New Zealand, Thailand, and Japan protested the killing of Kian delos Santos and others linked to the war on drugs.
- April 12, 2018: Bayan held a protest against Duterte in Hong Kong over the "tyranny" and spate killings amid the drug war campaign, and also calling for the resumption of peace talks.
- September 4, 2018: A protest was held in Jerusalem against Duterte, who was scheduled to meet with Israeli President Reuven Rivlin, for a "weapons deal between the two countries," with pictures showing Duterte holding a Galil assault rifle with the header "Stop the killings."
- June 18–19, 2020: A lone protester, Enzo Manzano, son of Edu Manzano, stood outside U.N. headquarters in New York City while holding a placard denouncing human rights violations, the conviction of Maria Ressa, the shutdown of ABS-CBN, and the passage of anti-terror bill.
- July 26, 2020: Filipinos in London held a protest in front of the Philippine Embassy, condemning the anti-terror law.
- September 21, 2020: Demonstrators held a rally outside the Philippine Consulate in New York City on the anniversary of Martial Law.
- March 15, 2021: Activist in Los Angeles held a rally to condemn the Bloody Sunday killings.
- May 5, 2021: Filipino migrants in London marched to Trafalgar Square to protest the handling of the COVID-19 pandemic.
- June 16, 2021: Filipino Americans rallied in front of the Philippine Embassy in Washington, D.C. where the dinner reception celebrating the 75th year of US-Philippine relations was held.
- July 25, 2021: Protesters gathered at the Philippine Consulate in New York City ahead of Duterte's 5th SONA.
- September 16, 2021: Filipino American activists held a rally in front of the United Nations in New York to oppose Presidential spokesperson Harry Roque's nomination to the International Law Commission, which the group believed that this is the way for the Duterte administration to avoid accountability for his war on drugs to the international community.
- September 22, 2021: Filipinos in The Hague, Netherlands, held a rally as part of the Martial Law anniversary.
