= Oplan Tambay =

- Date: June 13, 2018 – July 29, 2018
- Location: Metro Manila, Philippines
- Type: Law enforcement campaign
- Target: Street loiterers
- Participants: Philippine National Police
- Arrests: 78,359 loiterers (Metro Manila only, July 29, 2018)

Oplan Tambay was the law enforcement campaign first announced by President Rodrigo Duterte on June 13, 2018, that penalized the loiterers (Tagalog: tambays) who violated the city ordinance such as smoking in public places, drinking liquor on the streets, and going shirtless in public. The campaign had at least 8,000 residents were either accosted or apprehended for violating the rules in two weeks.

== Background ==
On September 18, 2017, Duterte said that he wanted the police to "pick up" the people who loiter in the streets at night and to arrest the person who drink liquor in public places. In his speech on June 13, 2018, Duterte ordered the police to impose stricter measures against the loiterers "to make the streets safer." The campaign was announced by the PNP Chief Director General Oscar Albayalde on June 18, 2018. He said that those who violated the local ordinances would be arrested. This includes drinking in public, alarm and scandal, curfew on minors, smoking on public, and partial nudity in public.

There are no laws that criminalize the bystanders. Then-President Benigno Aquino III signed the Republic Act 10158 on 2012 that decriminalized vagrancy. An Article 202 of the Revised Penal Code said that the police should arrest “any person found loitering about public or semi-public buildings or places or tramping or wandering about the country or the streets without visible means of support.” The said article has been removed, allowing the people to roam freely.

== Death of Genesis Argoncillo ==
The death of Genesis "Tisoy" Argoncillo has been attributed to the Oplan Tambay. Argoncillo, who was arrested during an Oplan Tambay operation on June 15, was allegedly killed by fellow detainees inside the Novaliches Police Station on June 19 after serving 4-days in the detention. On June 15, the Quezon City Police Department (QCPD)-Station 4 conducted a raid (also known as Oplan Galugad) in Sitio 5B, Novaliches. The police claimed that Argoncillo and his friends challenged a fight with them when the authorities arrived at their scene, thus Argoncillo was imprisoned for "alarm and scandal." The QCPD-4 chief denied that there was a "foul play" occurred on Argoncillo's death. On the midnight of June 18, one of the inmate discovered the unconscious Argoncillo.

According to Argoncillo's elder sister, Marilou Argoncillo, he was watching videos on his phone in front of a store next to their house in Novaliches, Quezon City, when police officers arrested him for being a shirtless. Other sources stated that, according to the police, Argoncillo was arrested for "being drunk and picking up a fight with his neighbors." Supt. Carlito Grijaldo, commander of Quezon City Police Station 4, said that Argoncillo's death was self-inflicted, claiming that the detainee was "mentally disturbed". A death certificate shows that Argoncillo's "immediate cause" of his death was "multiple blunt force trauma" applied to his "head, neck, chest, and upper extremities." QCPD Director Chief Supt. Joselito Esquivel said that Argoncillo had no signs of external injuries when the autopsy conducted. The police earlier claimed that Argoncillo had died from shortness of breath. The police filed the charges against Justin Mercado and Richard Bautista—alleged Sputnik gang members. The two were held responsible for supposedly mauling Argoncillo. According to Esquivel, they have been relieved at least five police officers following the death of Argoncillo.

== Reactions ==
This campaign was described by some sectors as another human rights violation being committed by the administration. Randy David, sociology professor of University of the Philippines Diliman, said in an opinion statement that Duterte has "able to instill fear in people's minds even without declaring martial law by ordering the Philippine National Police to crack down on "tambays" or street loiterers." Gabriela party-list blamed Duterte for high volume of loiterers in the streets, citing the low salary rate and the government's failure of ending the ENDO. Conversely, Chief Insp. Mercy Villaro, spokesperson of the Mandaue City Police Office said the campaign against loiterers "would help address the problem of fraternities in the city."

On June 25, a netizen posted a photo of commuters holding a tarpaulin banner saying "Hindi po kami tambay, nag-aabang lang ng jeep. At kung tambay man huwag kaming hulihin, saktan, patayin!" (transl. "We're not hanging out, just waiting for the jeep. And if we are bystanders, do not arrest, hurt, kill!") while waiting for a jeepney ride.

On June 26, Quezon City Rep. Winston Castelo said that he proposed to "deputized" the barangay tanods instead of police officers in implementing the anti-tambay campaign. The Department of Social Welfare and Development (DSWD) planned to build a community shelters for the street children as the campaign expands. On June 27, militant and religious groups protested against the campaign. On June 30, the Presidential Commission for the Urban Poor (PCUP) expressed support for the campaign against the loiterers.
