= Pandi housing project occupation =

- Part of protests against Rodrigo Duterte
- Date: March 8 — April 4, 2017 (27 days)
- Location: Pandi, Bulacan, Philippines
- Methods: House occupation, picketing, trespassing
- Result: Kadamay members eventually occupied the house as announced by President Rodrigo Duterte on April 4, 2017

Information
- Detained: April 3: 80 (37 person charged of trespassing); May 1: 1

In early March 2017, thousands of members of the group Kalipunan ng Damayang Mahihirap (Kadamay, 'Federation of Mutual Aid for the Poor') and other informal settlers illegally occupied an idle housing project of the National Housing Authority (Philippines) (NHA), in Pandi, Bulacan, in the Philippines.

== Background ==
Of the country's population of about 106 million, an estimated 4.5 million are homeless according to the Philippine Statistics Authority.

Of the housing units in the Pandi site, 538 were awarded specifically to Philippine National Police personnel. Utilities such as water and electricity are not yet available in some housing units. As of March 2017, 1,848 out of 9,128 houses were completed by the National Housing Authority (Philippines) (NHA). Police and military personnel had previously refused to move into the homes they were awarded, stating that these were too distant from their places of work and that, at 22-square meters per unit, were too small for them. Vice President and Housing and Urban Development Coordinating Council former chair Leni Robredo said that Pandi and other resettlement areas lack livelihood opportunities.

The Pandi occupation was done on vacant housing units, including those that have been left unoccupied for 5 years, according to Kadamay.

The 2017 Pandi housing takeover is sometimes seen as part of the global Occupy movement and its opposition to social and economic inequality. Leni Robredo stated that the government has a housing backlog of 5.5 million homes.

== Events ==
On March 8, 2017, Kalipunan ng Damayang Mahihirap (Kadamay), an urban poor group, led an occupation of about 5,000 idle government housing units in five relocation sites in Bulacan. Police reported that about 5,000 individuals occupied the housing units in Pandi Residences 3, Pandi Village 2 and Padre Pio. The National Housing Authority (Philippines) (NHA) stated that 4,000 housing units in the area were occupied.

Members of Kadamay set up barricades and appealed to President Rodrigo Duterte for free mass housing for the urban poor. Kadamay said the occupation was to protest against the failure of the Duterte administration and the housing authorities to provide shelter for the poor.

On March 13, a group of families, composed of 500–1,000 members, occupied the housing units in Bulacan. Duterte warned that homeless settlers must follow the law or he would be forced to remove them from the site. Senator Antonio Trillanes IV, on April 6, called Kadamay a "front organization of communists" and alleged that the community may be used as a "sanctuary" of communist rebels. On the same day, Duterte accused Kadamay of involvement in "anarchical activities" as he promised to prevent any efforts to occupy other housing projects. League of Filipino Students (LFS) national spokesperson JP Rosos condemned Duterte for stating what Kadamay did was anarchy. On March 14, Bagong Alyansang Makabayan (Bayan) told Duterte that the occupation of government housing units was not anarchy. Shirley Bravo of Kadamay-Bagong Bayan chapter denied that they were anarchic and that they were just asserting their rights to social services and decent housing. On March 16, NHA officials processed 160 housing applications from families who occupied the idle units in Pandi.

On March 20, Kadamay members protested the eviction notices against the occupation on idle housing units. Kadamay chair Gloria Arellano lambasted the PNP, whom it called "fear-mongers" in response to the occupation. Meanwhile, on March 21, about 15 Kadamay members attempted to enter housing units in Rodriguez, Rizal, but were stopped by police.

The NHA issued eviction notices, on March 23, to members of Kadamay who occupied the units. The urban poor group burned their notices once the NHA personnel left the area. On March 24, about 1,000 Kadamay members gathered again at the NHA office to demand their rights over 5,000 idle housing units. ACT Teachers partylist representatives criticized the NHA for issuing the eviction notices. Kilusang Mayo Uno, Bagong Alyansang Makabayan, Makabayan, Gabriela and Anakpawis members joined Kadamay to protest the lack of housing programs for the poor. Kadamay and the NHA, during a dialogue on March 27, came to an agreement that any units left unclaimed after the May 30 deadline would be transferred to the informal settlers.

The NHA announced a plan, on March 27, to expel 20,000 illegal dwellers from 5,262 housing units in Pandi, Bulacan. However, the NHA withdrew the orders after Kadamay agreed to undergo a validation process, which started on April 3, to determine whether the members are eligible, according to Anakpawis Rep. Ariel Casilao.

On April 4, Duterte announced that members of Kadamay may now live in units, as long as they do not oust police officers and soldiers who currently reside there. He also urged the soldiers and police officers to give up their claims to their houses occupied by Kadamay, vowing to build better housing projects by December.

In some units, it took a year for the residents to get water and 5 years to get electricity. As of December 2023, some units still do not have electricity.

== Aftermath ==
Before May 1, 2017, members of Kadamay gathered before the Ombudsman, demanding livelihoods and decent living wages so that they can pay their occupied house. On July 25, Duterte threatened to "shoot" them if Kadamay refused to follow his order not to occupy the houses again. He alleged that the group have gone rebellion and they ignore laws. Kadamay Chair Gloria Arellano lambasted Duterte, saying that housing programs are not on his agenda but only the soldiers, and the majority of making threats. On November 22, Kadamay gathered at NHA headquarters but the police blocked them.

In June 2018, a former member of the group alleged that Kadamay leaders have been charging each member P300 for every rally the group will stage, with the leaders allegedly threatening to evict the members from their units if they refused to pay. On September, he alleged that the group was being used as a breeding ground of the New People's Army contrary to the perception that it is a pro-poor advocate. Kadamay denied the allegations and said that the group respects the decision of members to quit. Some residents experienced red-tagging and other forms of harassment.

In 2019, Pandi Mayor Enrico Roque stated that giving legal status to Kadamay occupiers would bring economic benefits to the town of Pandi.
