= Brokenshire =

Brokenshire may refer to:

- Brokenshire College, Davao City, Philippines
- Brokenshire (surname), a surname from Cornwall, England. (Includes list of people of this name.)
