= Cosmopolitan Church =

Coordinates: 14°34′44.6″N 120°59′13.2″E

UCCP Cosmopolitan Church
- United Church of Christ in The Philippines Cosmopolitan Church
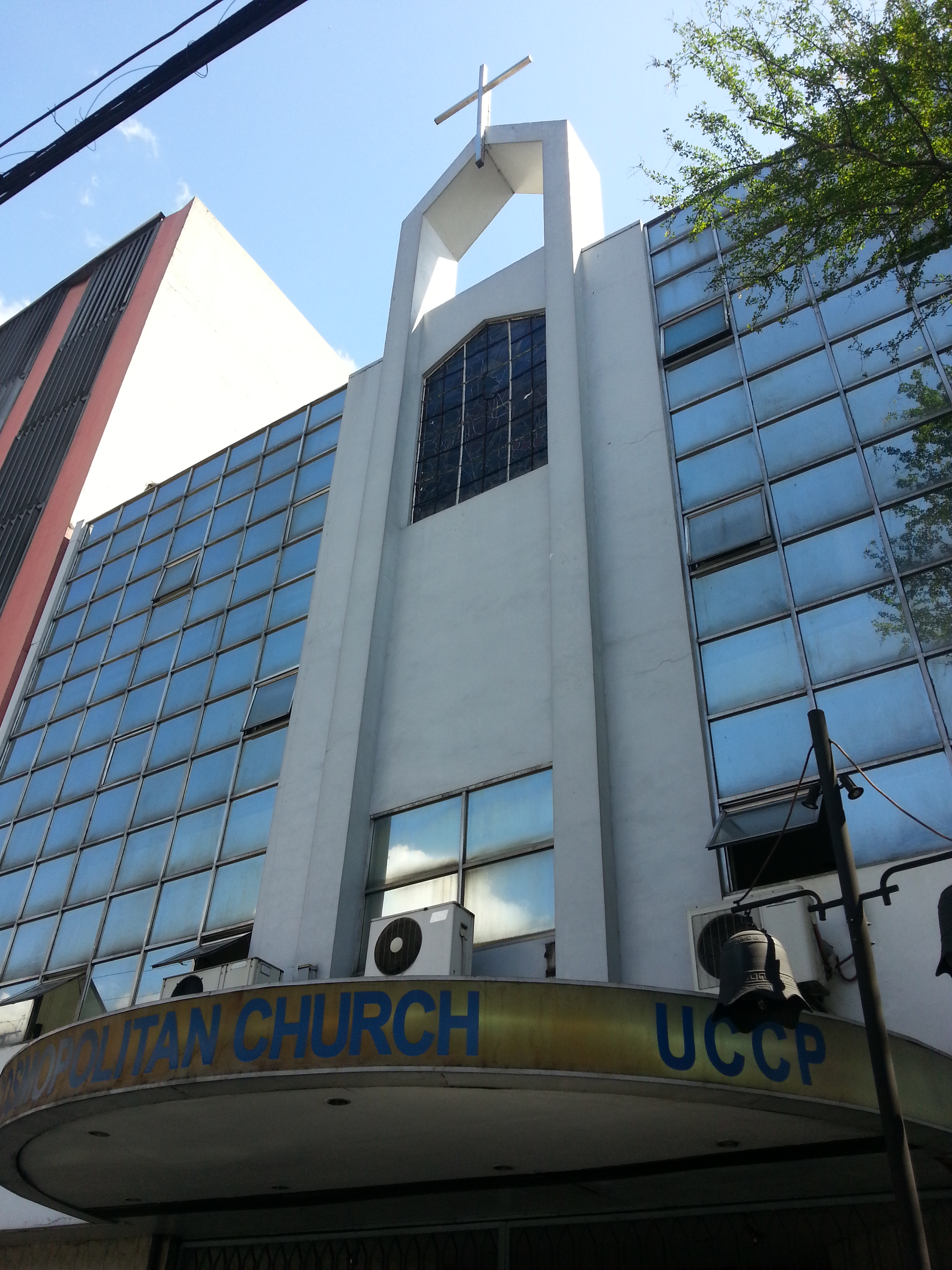
- UCCP Cosmopolitan Church
- Location: 1368 Taft Avenue Corner Apacible Street, Ermita, Manila
- Country: Philippines
- Denomination: UCCP
- Website: www.uccpcosmopolitanchurch.org

History
- Consecrated: 1933
- Events: Japanese occupation of the Philippines (1942-1944); Battle of Manila (1945)

Architecture
- Functional status: active
- Heritage designation: Cultural Property of the Philippines
- Completed: 1936, 1945 (rebuilt)
- Demolished: 1945

The UCCP Cosmopolitan Church is a Protestant church in Manila, Philippines.

== History ==
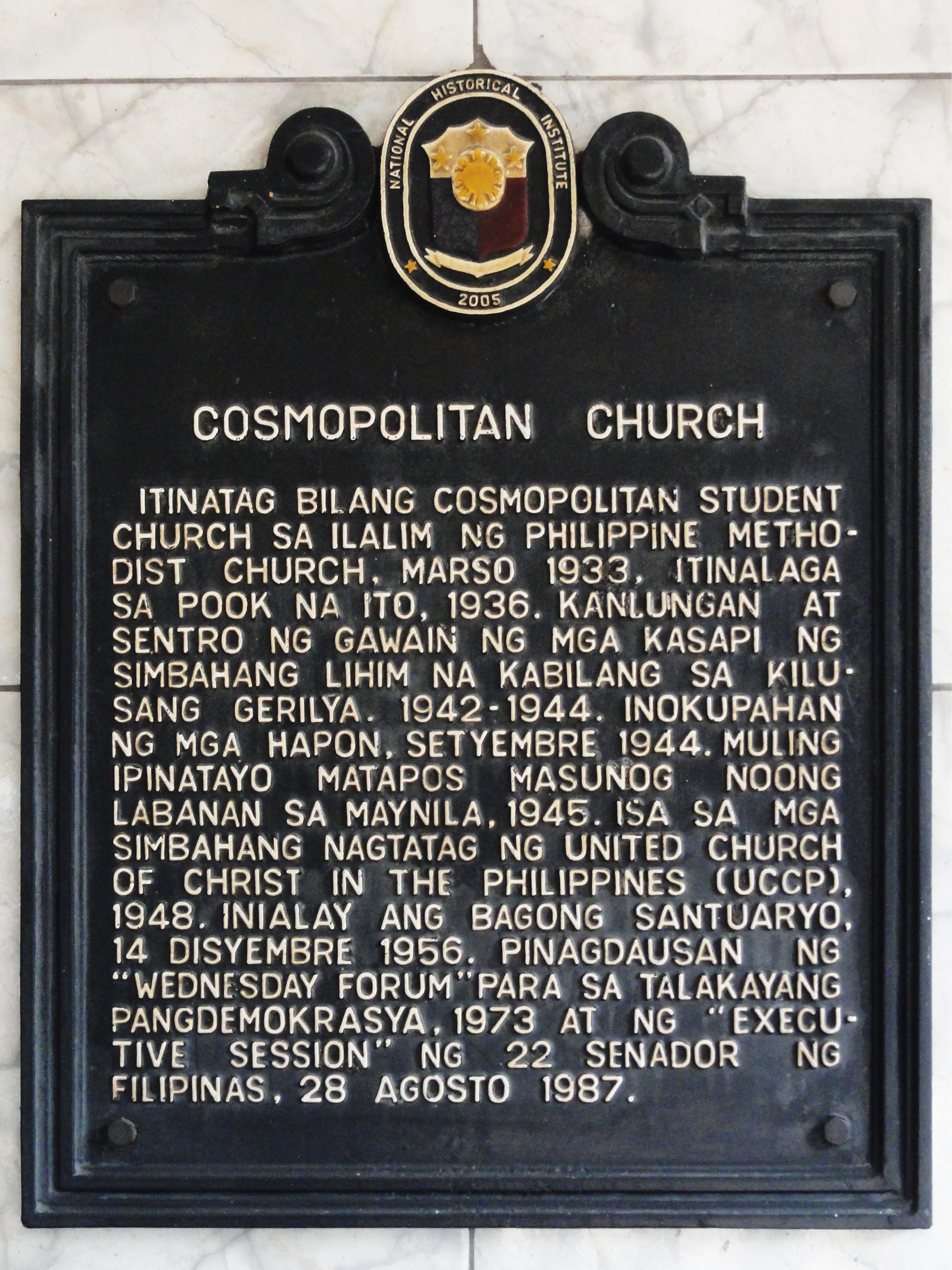
NHCP historical marker installed in 2005

=== Establishment ===
The Cosmopolitan Church's establishment traces back to the 1930s when 60 members of the Central Methodist Church on Kalaw Street, Ermita, Manila seceded from the American Methodist Episcopal Church in March 1933. The secession was led by Rev. Cipriano Navarro, Dr. Melquiades Gamboa, and Rev. Samuel Stagg, who were instrumental to the creation of the Philippine Methodist Episcopal Church which in turn led to the establishment of the Cosmopolitan Student Church.

=== World War II ===
The Cosmopolitan Church building was established in 1936. During the Japanese occupation of the Philippines in World War II from 1942 to 1944, the building was used as a base of operations by church members who joined the anti-Japanese guerrilla resistance. The building was eventually seized by Japanese forces in September 1944. It was rebuilt in 1945 after the building, along with many parts of the city, were razed and bombed in the Battle of Manila.

=== Joining the UCCP ===
In 1948, Cosmopolitan Church, then under the Philippine Methodist Church, became part of the United Church of Christ in the Philippines.

=== The Marcos dictatorship ===
In 1975, then-Pastor Círilo A. Rigos, along with Senator Jovito Salonga, organized the Paglingap Ministry to Political Detainees, which interceded for the release of political prisoners, and offered financial aid to their families during the dictatorship of then-President Ferdinand Marcos and his imposition of Martial Law. Over 90 detainees were freed through the effort of Rigos and Salonga's organization after five years.

=== Contemporary events ===
In 2012, some members of Cosmopolitan Church, led by the-Pastor Phoebe Dacanay, disaffiliated from the UCCP.

== Building ==
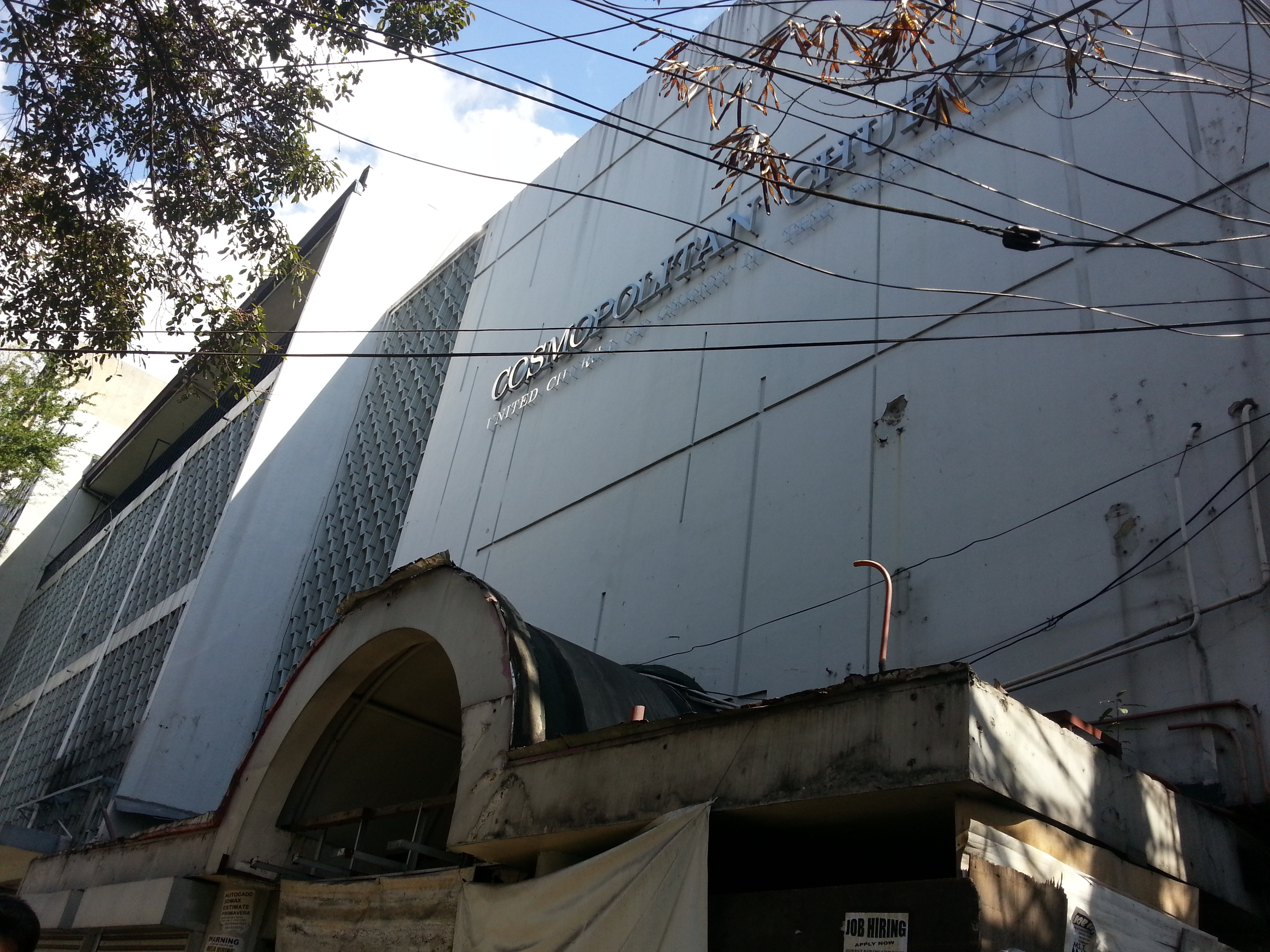
Façade, side view

The church currently occupies a four-story building called Rigos Hall. It was named after Martial Law-era pastor Dr. Círilo A. Rigos on May 15, 1996. The naming was an effect of the ratification of a Special Church Council Resolution.

The Mary Boyd Stagg Memorial Sanctuary inside Rigos Hall is the main worship space for the church. In 1999, eight stained glass panels of stained glass were installed in the Sanctuary as part of the church’s 66th anniversary celebrations.

The Angela Valdez Ramos Memorial Chapel within church grounds was dedicated on January 6, 1978, in memory of Angela Valdez-Ramos (mother of President Fidel V. Ramos), for her role in the church's Sunday school. The Founder's Garden, is a courtyard located between the Chapel and the Memorial Sanctuary.
