= Evangelical Methodist Church in the Philippine Islands =

- Iglesia Evangelica Metodista en las Islas Filipinas
- Abbreviation: IEMELIF
- Classification: Mainline Protestant
- Orientation: Methodism
- Polity: Connectionalism (Modified episcopal polity)
- General Superintendent: Bishop Noel M. Abiog
- General Secretary: Rev. Elben B. Rodriguez
- Region: Philippines
- Headquarters: Beulah Land IEMELIF Center Marytown Circle, Greenfields 1 Subdivision, Brgy. Kaligayahan Quirino Highway, Novaliches, Quezon City, Metro Manila 1124
- Founder: Nicolás V. Zamora
- Origin: Manila, Philippines
- Separated from: Methodist Episcopal Church
- Separations: I am Redeemer and Master Evangelical Church (IRMEC) (2011)
- Official website: https://www.iemelifchurch.com/

The Evangelical Methodist Church in the Philippine Islands (Spanish: Iglesia Evangelica Metodista en las Islas Filipinas, IEMELIF) is a Methodist Christian denomination. Founded on 28 February 1909 by Bishop Nicolás Zamora, it is recognized in the Philippines as the first indigenous Evangelical Protestant denomination.

== History ==
Behind the founding of the IEMELIF were Filipino nationalist and subsequent independence movements that blossomed in the late 19th century. Filipinos wanted full autonomy in all spheres including religion, as over three centuries of Spanish rule were marked by the Catholic Church's near-absolute control over the colony's temporal and spiritual affairs.

When the United States colonized the islands in 1898, they introduced Protestantism, which they propagated together with early Filipino evangelists. The Insular Government had a policy of religious tolerance, in contrast to Spanish employment of the Catholic Church (by then disestablished as the state church). Although the Americans upheld this principle of religious freedom, Filipinos wanted a truly autonomous church consistent with their yearnings for political freedom.

A group of Filipino preachers in the Methodist Episcopal mission in Tondo put up "Ang Katotohanan” (The Truth), an organization that carried on evangelistic work in the country.

=== Nicolás Zamora ===
Nicolás Zamora y Villegas was the first Filipino Protestant minister, well-known in Filipino and American evangelical circles. He was also the founder and pastor of what is now Knox Memorial Church. His father, Don Paulino Zamora, had been exiled from the colony for possession of a Bible, while Don Paulino's uncle, Father Jacinto Zamora, was one of the Gomburza priests who had been executed in 1872 by the Spaniards for supposed participation in the Cavite Mutiny.

When approached by Ang Katotohanan, Zamora accepted the leadership against the advice and importuning of the Americans. After some preparation, the group established the Iglesia Evangélica Metodista en las Islas Filipinas on 28 February 1909. Their vision and motivation was faith in God's providence, and belief that the Filipino was capable of erecting a self-sustaining, autonomous, and self-propagating evangelical church.

=== After Zamora ===
The fledgling Church quickly grew in numbers, spreading rapidly in Manila and its surrounding provinces. Bishop Zamora suddenly died on 14 September 1914, and Alejandro H. Reyes succeeded him. Reyes' successor was Victoriano Mariano who, aside from continuing the evangelization program from 1921 to 1926, also focused on Christian education. He saw to it that the laity knew what Church membership was all about, earning him the moniker “Father of Religious Education.” Francisco Gregorio's administration from 1926 to 1939 aimed to consolidate and build upon the achievements of his predecessors with the view to fortifying Church organization. Bishop Gregorio initiated the formulation of the IEMELIF's own Discipline, based upon the Methodist Episcopal Discipline, which until then the Church had been using with minor adaptations. The first Central Temple was also built during this time in Tondo, at the site of the present Cathedral; the Central Temple was destroyed by fire in 1941.

During World War II, the occupying Japanese authorities wanted all Protestant churches consolidated into what is now the United Church of Christ in the Philippines. Bishop Matías B. Valdez, the Church's general superintendent from 1939 to 1947, together with Bishop Dionisio D. Alejandro of the Methodist Church, firmly stood against the plan, whereas other churches yielded.

=== Post-war ===
Bishop Eusebio Tech's administration (1947–1952) saw the democratization of the Church. The Discipline was revised to create of the Supreme Consistory of Elders, a board that became the legislative body of the Church, whilst the general superintendent became the head of the Episcopacy, an organ which was tasked with administration.

The brief term of Bishop Marcelino C. Gutiérrez (1952–1953) saw important contributions in the organization of the Ministerial and Lay Workers Institute as a permanent agency of the Church. The Institute, which in 1991 became the present IEMELIF Bible College, trains ministers, deaconesses, and other lay workers of the Church. Bishop Lázaro G. Trinidad's leadership (1953–1972) saw rapid progress; it was during this time that the Cathedral was finally rebuilt. The Church also introduced the then-innovative central fund system, and formalized ties with local and foreign religious groups.

Bishop Gerónimo P. Maducdoc took over as general superintendent from 1972 to 1980. His administration was marked by greater participation of the laity in Church administration, with the inclusion of two laymen in the Supreme Consistory, which until then had been composed of only ministers. Among its other achievements were the Pagasa Trust Fund, intended to finance the social security needs of the Church; The Church Building Construction fund, to help in emergency needs for church construction; the Manpower Development Program, to train both ministers and laymen in religious, financial and social fields; and the evangelization program dubbed “Eighty by 1980”.

Bishop George F. Castro took over as the tenth general superintendent in 1980. The thrust of his administration was to adapt the Church to the changing times, to improve Church administration, to enhance evangelistic efforts, and to improve the professional and economic situation of ministers and Church workers. The IEMELIF also became more outgoing, participating in both local and international meetings and fellowships.

=== Schism ===
In 1992, the IEMELIF began experiencing some issues within its episcopal offices, which led to the secession of some 105 local churches and ministers forming what is now known as the IEMELIF Reform Movement (IRM), led by Bishop Reynaldo C. Domingo. The IRM initially referred to the original body as "IEMELIF Admin", which signifies acknowledgement of administration by the latter. In 2009, the two factions celebrated the IEMELIF's centennial in separate locations. The IEMELIF Admin held a program at the Araneta Coliseum in Quezon City, while the IRM held theirs at the Cuneta Astrodome in Pasay.

In late 2011, the IRM completed its schism from the IEMELIF and has since registered with the Securities and Exchange Commission as I Am Redeemer and Master Evangelical Church (IRMEC), leaving only one IEMELIF in the whole of the Philippines. IEMELIF maintains its membership in the National Council of Churches in the Philippines, while IRMEC joined the Philippine Council of Evangelical Churches.

=== Recent years ===
Bishop Nathanael P. Lázaro was elected as the eleventh general superintendent in 2000. Imbued with administrative abilities, he caused significant changes in the organization and administration of the Church to make it more "attuned to the Great Commandment of the Lord Jesus Christ as stated in the Gospels." His efforts led to the overall amendment of the IEMELIF Book of Discipline in 2007.

== Government recognition ==
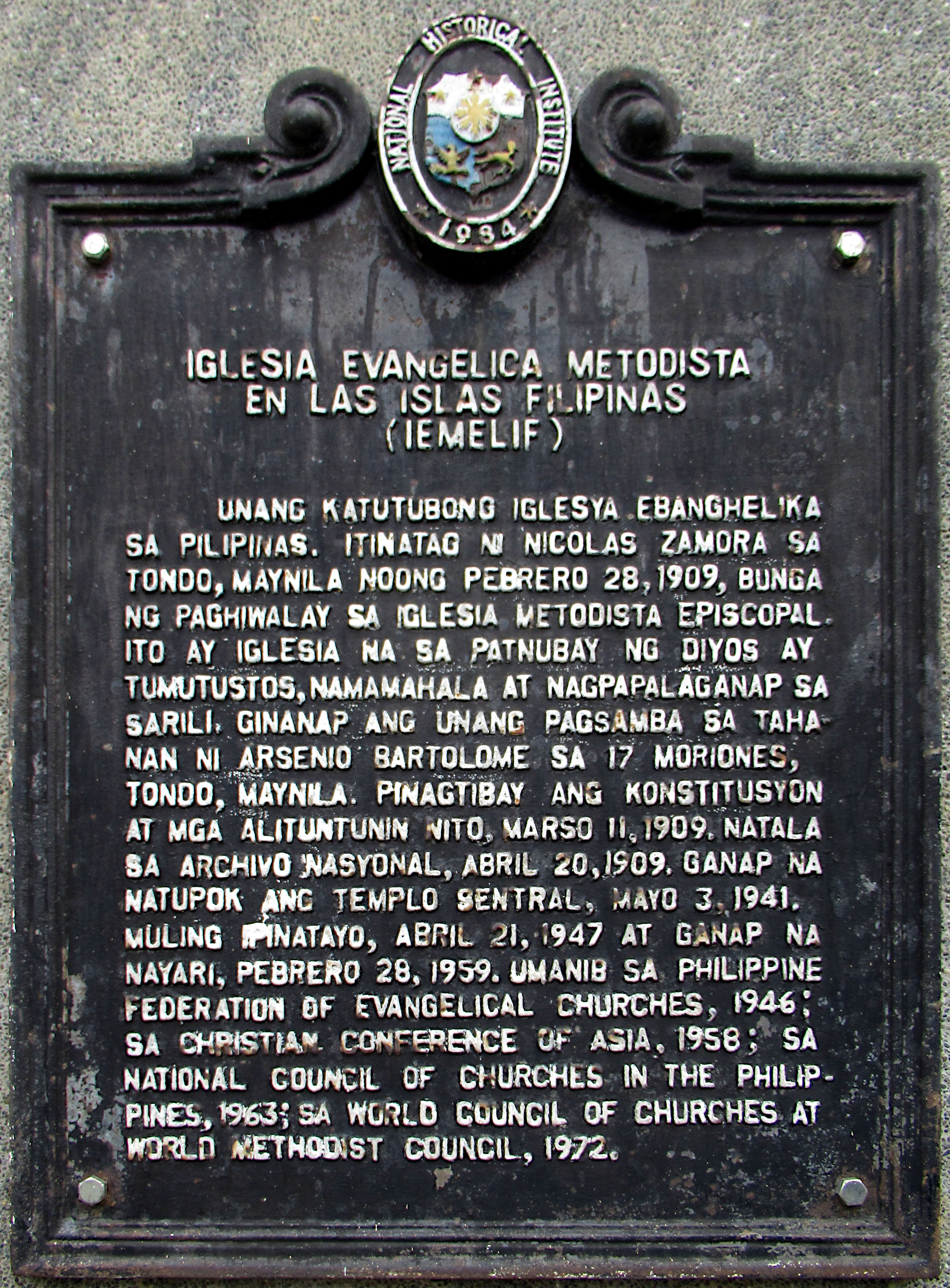
Historical Marker

In October 1979 — in celebration of both the 80th anniversary of Methodism in the Philippines and the 70th founding anniversary of the IEMELIF — the Metro Manila Commission renamed Sande Street fronting the Church's cathedral to Nicolas Zamora Street, after the Church's founder.

During the 75th founding anniversary of the IEMELIF, President Ferdinand E. Marcos proclaimed "February 28, 1984, as a special historical church day for thanksgiving on the founding of the first indigenous evangelical church in the Philippines." On the same day, a historical marker was installed by the National Historical Institute in front of the cathedral.

== Civic contributions ==
The Church does not confine itself to purely internal matters. It also conducts public crusades and rallies, as well as house-to-house Bible studies.

It also involves itself in civic and community affairs, extends help to victims of natural calamities like typhoons, earthquakes, and fires.

It is also active in helping promote matters of public interest such as the movements against drug use and against air and water pollution. Helping promote public awareness of civic duties like voting is among its concerns.

== Governance ==
The Church is led by a general superintendent, who is responsible for the well-being of all churches within the jurisdiction of the IEMELIF. The current general superintendent is Bishop Noel M. Abiog, who accepted the post in 2016.

General superintendents of the
Iglesia Evangelica Metodista en las Islas Filipinas
Bishop Nicolás V. Zamora, 1909 – 1914
Bishop Alejandro H. Reyes, 1914 – 1922
Bishop Victoriano Mariano, 1922 – 1928
Bishop Francisco Gregorio, 1928 – 1939
Bishop Matias B. Valdez, 1939 – 1948
Bishop Eusebio Tech, 1948 – 1952
Bishop Marcelino C. Gutierrez, 1952 – 1953
Bishop Lázaro G. Trinidad, 1953 – 1972
Bishop Gerónimo P. Maducdoc, 1972 – 1980
Bishop George F. Castro, 1980 – 2000
Bishop Nathanael P. Lázaro, 2000 – 2016
Bishop Noel M. Abiog, 2016 – present;

== IEMELIF Cathedral ==
IEMELIF Cathedral
- Ang Katedral ng IEMELIF
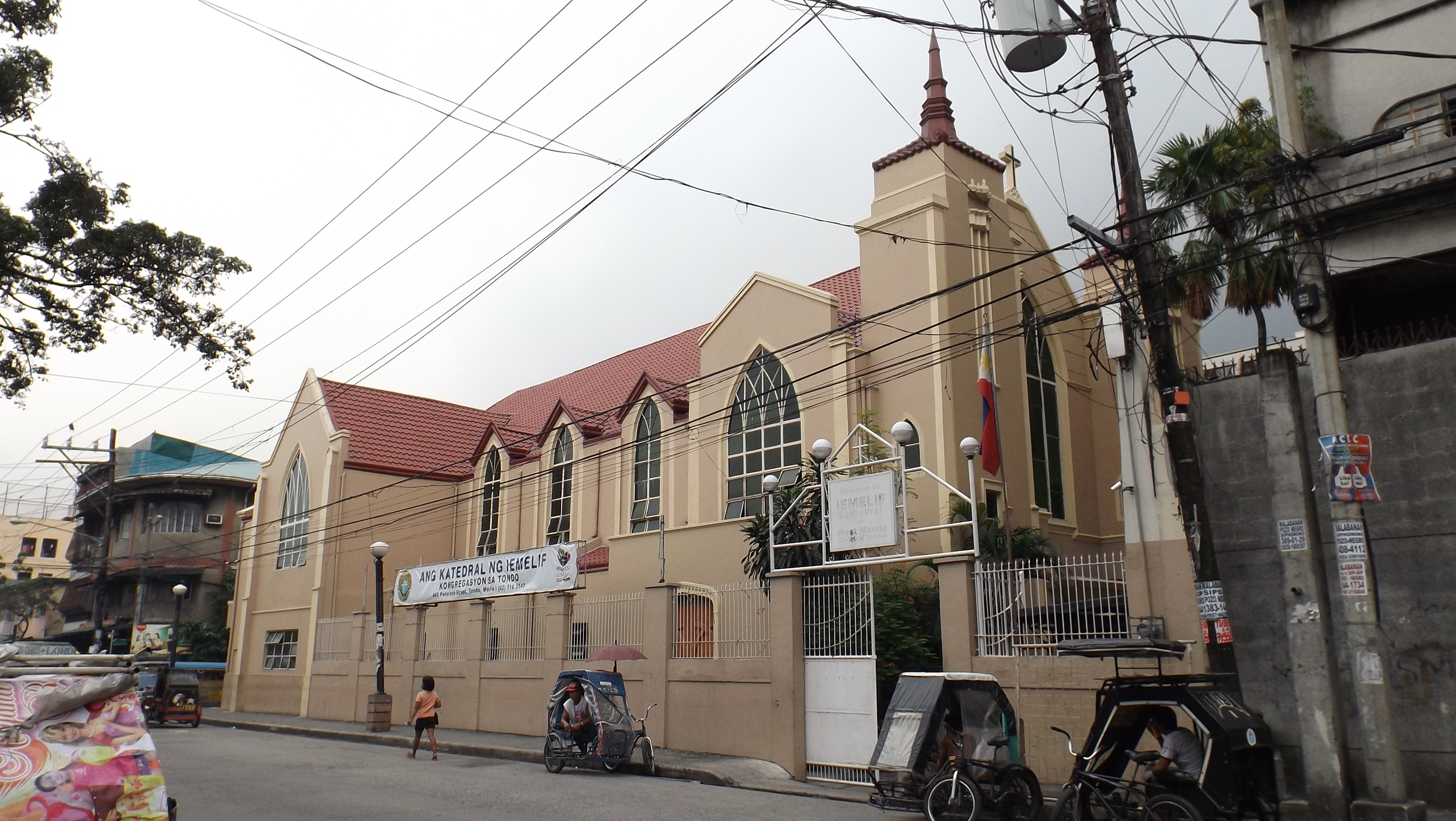
- Western façade of the IEMELIF Cathedral
- 14.614040°N 120.969472°E
- Location: Tondo, Manila
- Country: Philippines
- Denomination: Iglesia Evangelica Metodista en las Islas Filipinas

History
- Status: Active
- Founded: 1928
- Founder: Bishop Nicolás V. Zamora

Architecture
- Architect: Benjamín T. Félix
- Style: Gothic Revival
- Groundbreaking: 1928
- Completed: 28 February 1959

Clergy
- Bishop: Bishop Noel M. Abiog
- Dean: Bishop Nathanael P. Lazaro
- Pastor: Rev. Roberto I. Bacani

=== History ===
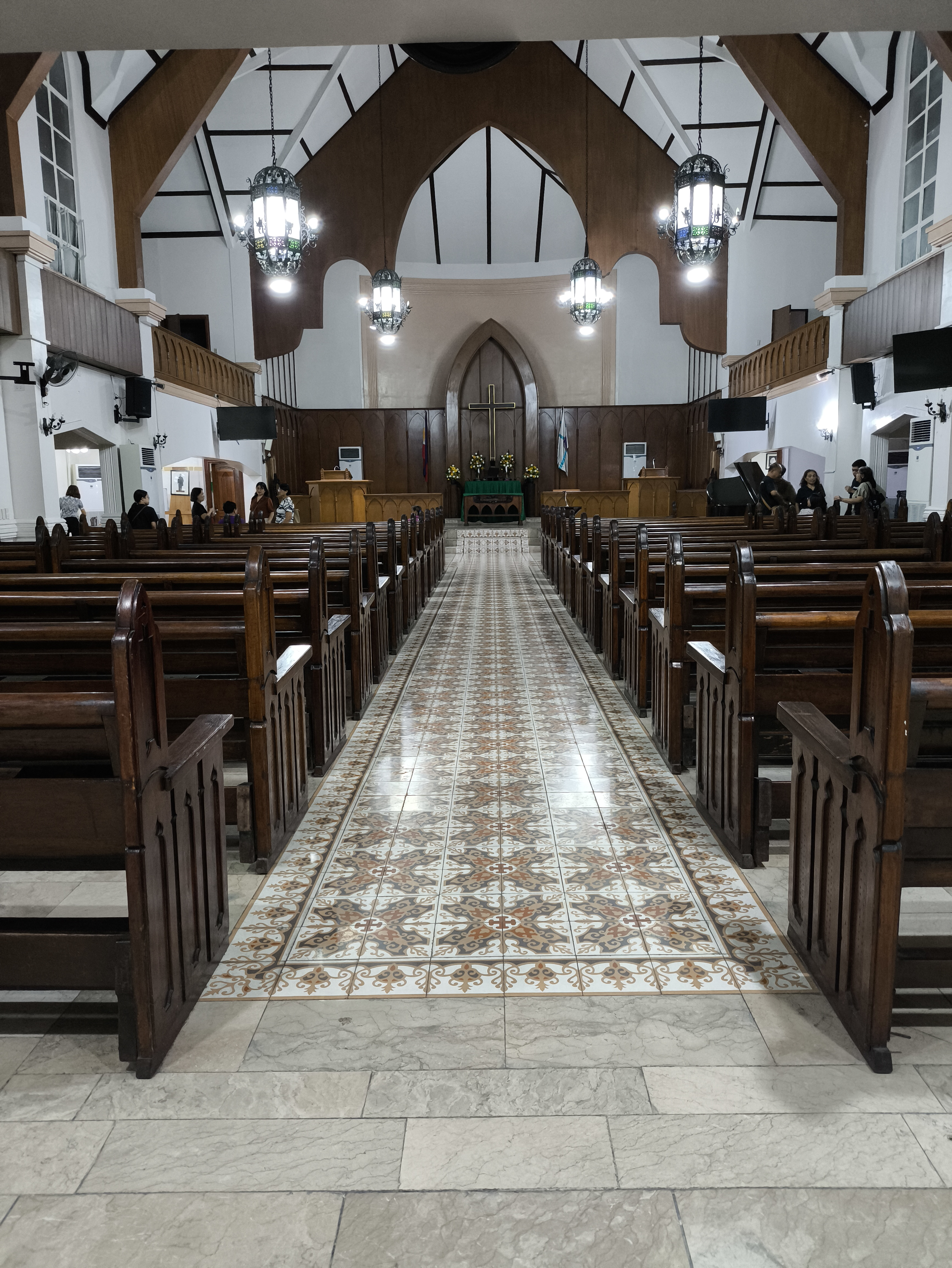
Inside the IEMELIF Cathedral.

The original cathedral of the IEMELIF was built in over 13 years and completed in 1938. It was destroyed in a large fire that gutted Tondo, Manila on 3 May 1941, and rebuilt at the same site and completed on 28 February 1959, which was also the Church's 50th anniversary.

Architect Benjamín T. Félix drew up the structural design of the new cathedral. The church is laid out in a traditional cruciform plan, facing northwest. The building is constructed of cement in the Gothic style. Its façade is flanked by twin spires, and features a large, quadruple lancet window at its centre. The eastern and western flanks of the edifice have pointed arch stained glass windows, which cast a light-green hue throughout the interior.

A large, newly constructed choir loft looms above and over the narthex and entrance to the nave, which has a high ceiling with decorative hanging lamps. The framing of the ceiling, as well as the altar reredos, are made from Narra (Pterocarpus indicus), donated by Brother Edward Tan, an avid sympathiser of the Church. The pulpit, lectern, pews and transept balconies have richly carved woodwork with the same theme.

=== Leadership ===
According to the Discipline, the cathedral serves as the episcopal seat of the current General Superintendent, Bishop Noel M. Abiog. Although the cathedral acts as a lone congregation subject directly to the General Superintendent, its involvement in the activities of the Church is under District I North - Manila.
