= Samuel Stagg =

Samuel Wells Stagg
- Born: 1897
- Died: 1956 (aged 58–59)

Samuel Wells Stagg (1897-1956) was a Methodist missionary who traveled to the Philippines as the "Special Field Scout Commissioner" of the Boy Scouts of America to assist in organizing the Boy Scouts of America Philippine Islands Council No. 545 which was set up on 5 October 1923 through the initiative of the Rotary Club of Manila, with Stagg as one of the 22 Charter Members.

== Early life ==
Samuel Stagg was born in California to William Tinsley Stagg and Annie Eleanor Wells. Stagg graduated from Turlock High School in 1915 and the University of Southern California. He married Mary Letty Boyd in 1917. He moved to Manila, Philippine Islands in 1923, and became the pastor of the Central Church on San Luis Street (now Kalaw Avenue, Malate, Manila), affiliated with the General Conference of the Methodist Church of America. In 1933, Stagg and other church members left the Central Church and the GCMCA, and formed the Cosmopolitan Student Church (now the Cosmopolitan Church) and the General Conference of the Methodist Church of the Philippines.

Rev. Samuel Stagg defended President Manuel L. Quezon's veto of a Catholic-supported Commonwealth Assembly bill to provide religious instruction in public schools.

=== Mary Letty Boyd Stagg ===
Just before the Second World War, Samuel Stagg was recruited into U.S. Navy intelligence; none of his work in this job, however, has come to light. His wife Mary Boyd Stagg (1893-1944) then took over as pastor of the Cosmopolitan Church, becoming the first female ordained a Protestant minister in the Philippines. "Mother" Stagg and members of the church were active in humanitarian relief work, distributing food and medicine, and performing welfare activities for displaced persons, fugitives from the Japanese (Chinese business and community leaders), and resistance fighters.

Betrayed by a Japanese double-agent, Franco Vera Reyes, Mary and her friends were arrested by the Japanese in January 1944. They were interrogated and tortured at Fort Santiago in Manila by the Kempeitai. On 25, 28, 29, or probably 30 August 1944, Dr. Hawthorne Darby, Helen Jonaline Wilk, Mary Boyd Stagg, Blanche Jurika, and another woman named Sybil were taken to the Cementerio del Norte where they were beheaded and buried. Their common grave was found in 1945 by guerrilla leader Thomas Walker Jurika, who threatened and forced the double-agent Richard Sakakida to reluctantly reveal the grave's location. In 1956 Darby, Wilk, and Mary Stagg were posthumously conferred the Philippine Legion of Honor, and were also awarded the Medal of Freedom by the United States government. Their remains have been exhumed and re-interred at Cosmopolitan Church.

=== Samuel Boyd Stagg ===
Samuel and Mary Stagg's son Samuel Boyd Stagg (d. 2008) was arrested with his mother 28 January 1944, and imprisoned first at Fort Santiago, then at the Santo Tomas Internment Camp, Manila.

=== Mary Ruth Stagg Webb ===
Samuel and Mary Stagg's daughter Mary Ruth Stagg married Glenn Watson Webb, had a daughter, Constance Webb Clear (1949-2003), and authored Not My Will, a biography of her mother.

== Later life ==
Samuel Stagg worked as a farmer, educator, and writer of the Philippines Free Press under the pen name Jungle Philosopher. He was married a second time to Martha, a Filipina with whom he had a child. Stagg died of a heart attack in Palawan in November 1956.

== Scouting legacy ==
Both sons, Lionel Paul Stagg and Samuel Boyd Stagg were active Scouts in Manila. Lionel made Life Scout before leaving to attend college in the United States. Samuel had completed work for Eagle Scout, but the war interrupted and all his records were lost.

Mary Stagg founded the Campfire Girls (sister organization of the Boy Scouts of America) in the Philippines. In 1925, the Camp Fire Girls of Manila received the Grace Carley Medal.

== Bibliography ==
- Kaminski, Theresa (2016). Angels of the Underground. New York: Oxford. ISBN 978-0199928248.
- Stagg, Samuel Wells (2009) [1922]. Home Lessons in Religion. General Books. ISBN 978-1151395016. "ISBN 9781151395016"
- Stagg, Samuel Wells (1922). How to Promote Home Religion: the working program of one church. Abingdon Press.
- Stagg, Samuel Wells (1928). The Ideal Woman and Other Themes. Philippines: Self-published.
- Stagg, Samuel Wells (2006) [1934]. Teodoro R. Yangco: leading Filipino philanthropist and grand old man of commerce. Manila: University of the Philippines Press: University of Michigan.
- Stagg, Samuel Wells & James Drought (1929). The Stagg-Drought Debate as Conducted by the Tribune. Methodist Publishing House.
- Stagg, Samuel Wells; Stagg, Mary Boyd (1922). Home Lessons In Religion, A Manual for Mothers. Vol. 2. Abingdon Press. "Reprinted 2009, 2010 (Kessinger Publishing), 2011 (Nabu Press). ISBN 116650736X. ISBN 9781166507367"
- Stagg, Samuel Wells & Mary Boyd Stagg (1924). Home Lessons In Religion, A Manual for Mothers. Vol. 3 : The six- and seven-year old. Cincinnati: Abingdon Press.
- Webb, Mary Ruth Stagg (1997). Not My Will: a Christian martyr in the Philippines. Pasig, Philippines: Anvil Publishing. ISBN 971-27-0560-9. "ISBN 978-9712705601"
