= Brokenshire (surname) =

Origin
- Meaning: unclear
- Region of origin: English-speaking countries

Other names
- Variant forms: Brokensha, Brokenshaw

Brokenshire is a surname of Cornish origin. The original derivation of the surname is unclear. It is found in the early 1600s, and possibly earlier, in the area around Roche, Cornwall, and formed a diaspora from there. Suggestions that Brokenshire is a regional variant of the early English / Yorkshire surname Burkinshaw, or similar, are unhelpful, since there is no explanation of the geographical split nor variance. It seems likely that the surname Brokenshire arose independently in Cornwall.

Brokenshire does not appear as a first name, but occurs as a surname in English-speaking countries.

== List of persons with the surname ==
- David Brokenshire (1925–2014), New Zealand architect and potter
- Geoff Brokenshire (1922–1986), Australian rules footballer
- Herbert Cecil Brokenshire (1896–1944), American doctor, who founded Brokenshire College, Philippines
- James Brokenshire, PC, MP (1968–2021), British politician
- Laurie Brokenshire (1952–2017), Royal Navy officer and British puzzlist
- Mark Brokenshire (born 1961), Australian rugby league player
- Norman Brokenshire (1898–1965), Canadian and American radio announcer
- Robert Brokenshire (born 1957), Australian dairy farmer and politician

== See also ==
- Cornish surnames
- Shire
