= Southern Christian College (Philippines) =

Christian college in Cotabato, Philippines

- Type: Private Institution
- Established: 1949
- Affiliations: PRISAA, COPRISA
- Religious affiliation: Protestant, United Church of Christ in the Philippines
- President: Edwin T. Balaki
- Location: Midsayap, Cotabato, Philippines; 7°11′56″N 124°32′15″E
- Colors: Blue and gold
- Website: southernchristiancollege.edu.ph
- Location in Mindanao Location in the Philippines

Southern Christian College is a college in Midsayap, Cotabato, Philippines.

== History ==
In 1937, Rev. Proculo Rodriguez of Silliman University visited Midsayap. He met Mr. Bibiano Quiñones and Mr. and Mrs. Fernando dela Serna and planned on putting up a Protestant school in Mindanao. In June 1941, the Maguindanao Institute was opened; it was registered as non-sectarian, a stock corporation with 37 stockholders. Mr. Quiñones, with more than half of the shares of stock of Maguindanao Institute, offered to donate his shares of stock to the new school. This gesture was influential in the decision of choosing Midsayap as the site of Southern Christian College.

The Cotabato and Davao Conferences bought the present site from the stockholders of the defunct Maguindanao Institute that dissolved itself and paved the way for the new Christian school, Southern Christian College (SCC). The members of the women's organization of both conferences raised initial contribution, cash or in-kind, to start the school's operation. SCC was established as a non-stock, non-profit religious educational institution in 1949. It was registered with the Securities and Exchange Commission as an educational arm of United Church of Christ in the Philippines. The original incorporators, who also composed the first Board of Trustees, were: Atty. Florentino L. Martinez, Mr. Claudio P. Fajardo, Rev. Elton Brown, Mr. Clemente Dimafeliz, Dr. Samuel Royola, Rev. Manuel J. Villanueva, Mr. Fernando dela Cerna, Mr. Bibiano Quiñones, Mr. Juan Cruzado, and Mr. Emilio Albarico.

Since its foundation, Church Workers, either layperson or minister has administered Southern Christian College. Atty. Florentino L. Martinez served the SCC in 1949 to the 1950; Rev. Angel J. Alvaro, 1950–53; Prof. Guillermo Magdamo, 1953-1960; Bishop Proculo ROdriguez; 1960–63; Dr. Eliezer D. Mapanao (1965-1987); Dr. Filemon L. Lagon (1987-1994); Dr. Eliezer D. Mapanao (1994-1997); and Dr. Erlinda N. Senturias (1997- May 31, 2007), SCC's first Woman College President.

SCC embarked on auxiliary programs that will provide financial under girding to continue SCC's vision-mission in education. The SCC Feedmill that seeks to provide accessible, available and affordable livestock, feeds, was started by Rev. John Beran, a fraternal worker from the united Presbyterian Church in the USA. It was recently registered as Saranay Feeds.
