= Nicolás Zamora =

Filipino methodist minister (1875–1914)

Bishop Nicolás Villegas Zamora
- 1st General Superintendent of IEMELIF
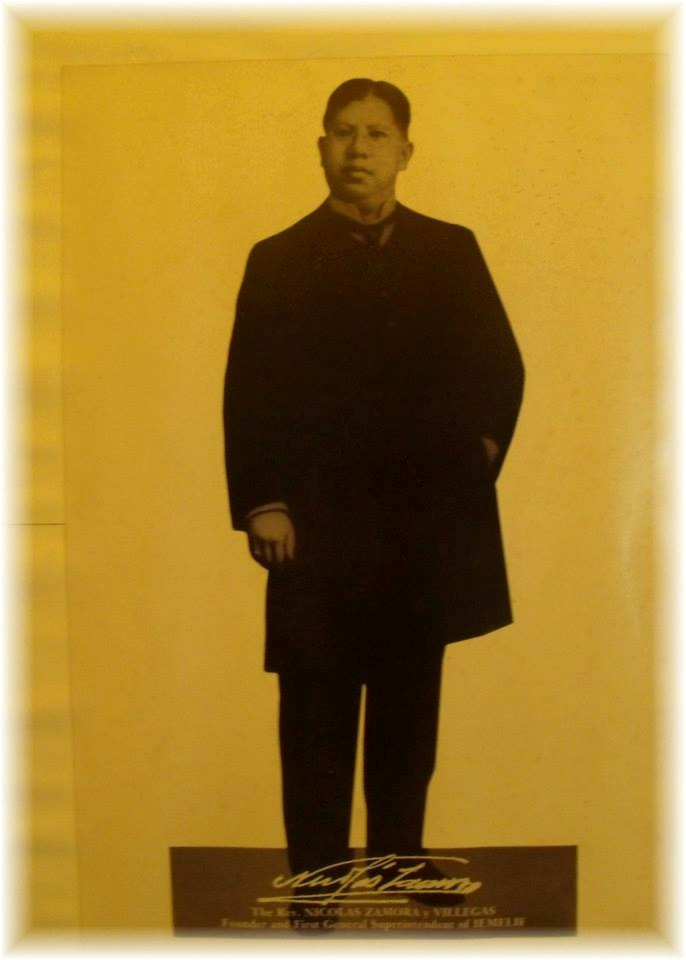
- Portrait of Nicolás Zamora, his signature on the bottom
- Church: Iglesia Evangelica Metodista en las Islas Filipinas
- Elected: 28 February 1909
- Term ended: 14 September 1914
- Successor: Bishop Alejandro H. Reyes

Orders
- Ordination: 10 March 1900 by Bishop James Mills Thoburn
- Consecration: posthumously, 14 September 1956

Personal details
- Born: 10 September 1875 Binondo, Manila, Captaincy General of the Philippines
- Died: 14 September 1914 (aged 39) Bulakan, Bulacan, Philippine Islands
- Buried: Beulah Land IEMELIF Center, Novaliches, Quezon City, Metro Manila
- Denomination: Methodist
- Parents: Don Paulino Zamora

Nicolás Villegas Zamora (10 September 1875 – 14 September 1914) was a Methodist minister who is credited with the foundation of the first indigenous evangelical church in the Philippines, known as the Iglesia Evangelica Metodista en las Islas Filipinas. Zamora is also recognized as the first native Filipino Protestant minister in the Philippines.

== Early life and career ==
Zamora was born in Binondo, Manila on 10 September 1875. His mother was Estefania Villegas; his father, Paulino Zamora, is regarded as the first Filipino Protestant in the Philippines. Nicolás was a nephew of Father Jacinto Zamora, one of the three priests collectively called Gomburza executed after being implicated to the 1872 Cavite mutiny. He was first educated under Father Pedro Serrano in Intramuros, and then pursued higher education at Ateneo Municipal de Manila with the aid of his godfather, Pablo Zamora. From Ateneo he had earned his Bachelor of Arts degree. Zamora then took up law as his master's degree prerequisite for priesthood at the University of Santo Tomas, but his schooling was interrupted by the outbreak of the Philippine Revolution in 1896. Meanwhile, his father Paulino was exiled by the Spanish government for suspected involvement in the Revolution.

He served as a Teniente Mayor (Chief Lieutenant) in the Philippine Revolutionary Army under the command of General Gregorio del Pilar. By this time, Zamora had been secretly reading the Bible, and this convinced him of father’s Protestant faith. Thus, after the return of his father from exile in 1898, they began preaching activities even before the arrival of American Protestant missionaries.

== Conversion and lay preaching ==
Zamora and his father met the Presbyterian mission, which arrived on 21 April 1899, led by Dr. James B. Rodgers. They were among the nine persons who were first entered into the Presbyterian Church in the Philippines. Zamora was baptized by Rodgers on 22 October 1899. However, he was not to be a preacher for the Presbyterian mission but for the Methodist mission.

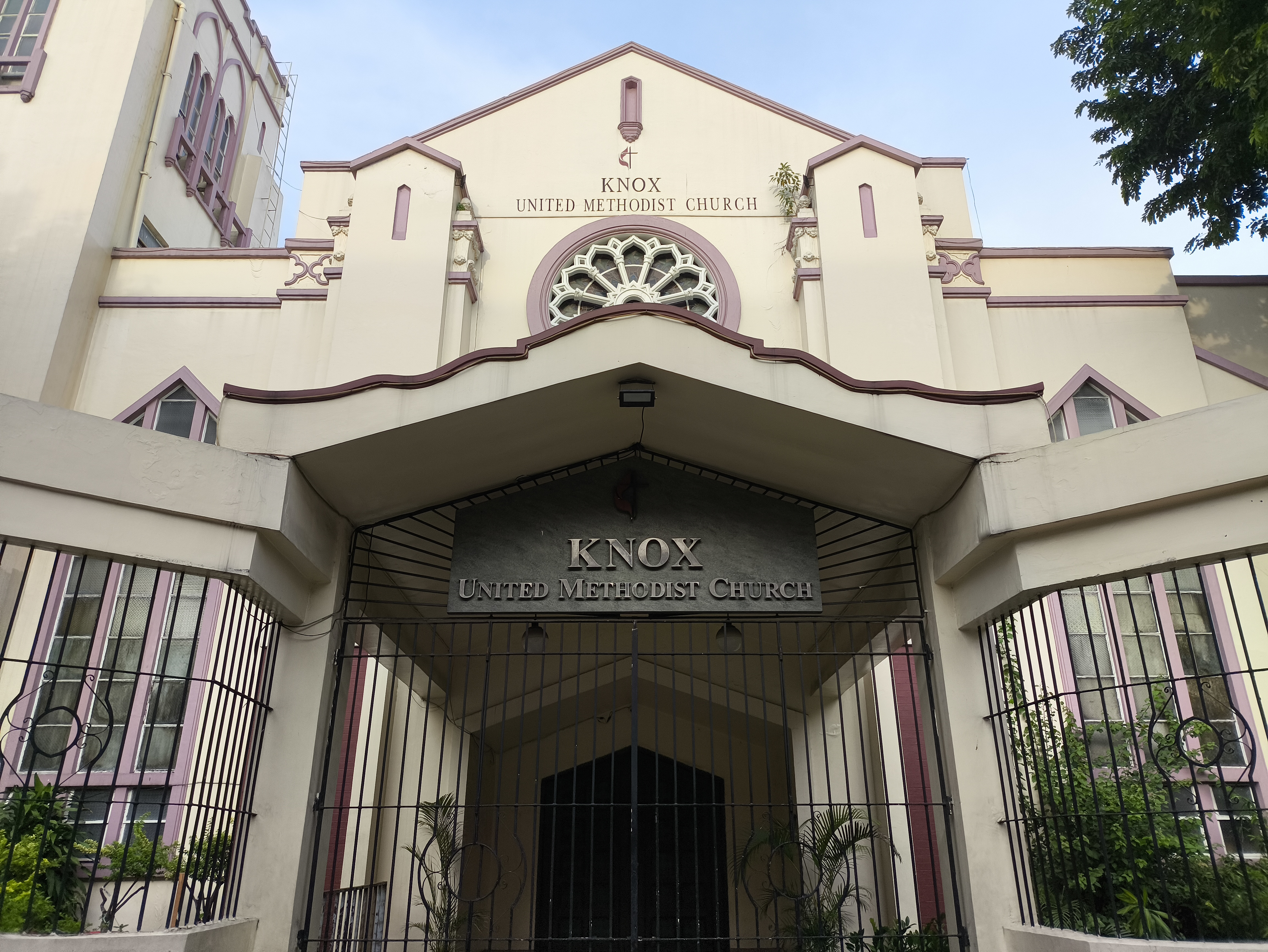
Zamora began as a preacher with the Knox United Methodist Church.

The first Protestant mission to hold a service in the Philippines was the Methodist mission. Led by Arthur W. Prautch, the service was held in June 1899. By July 1899, Prautch's interpreter did not arrive. After being convinced by Prautch, Zamora agreed to be his interpreter. Speaking in good Tagalog, Zamora was able to attract his audience with his testimony, both Filipino and American. By October 1899, the congregation to which Zamora preached had grown to 130 members.

== Ordination and church service ==
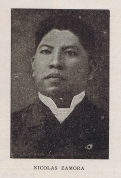
Zamora featured in an American newspaper, 1904.

On March 10, 1900, after eight months of lay preaching under the Methodist Episcopal Church, Bishop James M. Thoburn ordained Zamora a deacon in the very place where he first preached in July 1899. In the First District Conference held on 20–23 August 1900, Zamora reported that his evangelistic work had reached seven places, with eight weekly services, 220 probationary members, seven Filipino workers, seven baptisms, and 38 marriages. In 1902, he preached at a thanksgiving service that was attended by more than 12,000 people. The audience included Bishop Gregorio Aglipay and Isabelo de los Reyes of the Philippine Independent Church, a national church that listed around a million members at the time. In the same year, while preaching the Gospel in Caloocan, he was drawn into a discussion by Father Valentin Tangag. Since the Catholic priest was unable to suggest a topic for discussion, Zamora chose sainthood and the futility of prayers to the saints. Tangag was unable to rebut Zamora's points, and thus retreated to his convent. The following Sunday, with more than 2,000 people eager to witness the discussion, Zamora brought his Bibles (which included the translation of Father Scio Torres Amat, the Latin Vulgate, the Hebrew, and the Greek versions) to Tangag. The latter had not left his convent to continue the discussion, but upon seeing Zamora, he attempted to punch the latter in the face. Zamora was able to dodge the blow, and the people with him tried to retaliate. Tangag was quick to retreat to the convent, prompting the crowd to shout in unison, "¡Viva Cristo y su Evangelio!" (Long live Christ and His Gospel!)

Such was the success of Zamora in spreading the Gospel that it had exceeded 15 years of Methodist efforts in China. By 1901, 300 Filipino members had been received into the Methodist Church. In recognition of these efforts, Bishop Frank W. Warne forwarded the ordination of Zamora as an elder of the Methodist Episcopal Church. On 15 March 1903, Zamora was ordained Elder at the Teatro Libertad along Rizal Avenue in Manila. He continued his fervent service to the Church. On 18 April 1903, he preached at a grand rally at Mexico, Pampanga. It was attended by more than 2,000 people. In May of the same year, he held two services at Hagonoy, Bulacan. It was attended by more than 1,000 people. Throughout the year 1903 until early 1904, he held 281 services and preached 218 sermons. Attendance in Manila reached 18,720, and 27,250 in the nearby provinces. He also held 20 prayer meetings attended by some 800 people. Among the more prominent members who would join the church by this time would be Felix Manalo. By 1908, the Church grew to a total membership of 27,500, with 33,000 more being adherents. Since there were fewer Methodist missionaries as compared to other Protestant missions, particularly the Presbyterian mission (34 as compared to 53), this achievement can be attributed to Zamora and the Filipino evangelists that helped the Church. As of 1908, there were more than 500 lay preachers and exhorters.

== Schism ==
=== Before the schism ===
Dissatisfied with the lack of progress in Filipinizing the Church, as well as the dominance of American missionaries and their attitude of racial discrimination, Church members at Tondo, Manila established Ang Kapisanang Katotohanan (The Society of Truth) in 1904. Their primary purpose was to accelerate the pace of evangelism and initiate methods that would make Filipino evangelists be at par with their American counterparts. Due to the threat of secession, the American missionaries had to counter the momentum of the society. Thus, they transferred Zamora to the Tondo church in 1906. Zamora's efforts to keep the church together was successful, for by 1907, the society was disbanded. Actually, the Tondo church even grew. From 500 members in 1906, there were 588 members in 1907.

After the rejection of granting "foreign field" status to the Philippine Church in 1908, Zamora grew disenchanted with the way the Methodist Church was going. He saw this as nothing less than death of autonomy of Philippine Methodism. This prompted him to join the revived Ang Kapisanang Katotohanan. On 20 February 1909, Nicolás Zamora met with the society members at the house of Moises Buzon in Tondo, wherein they agreed to secede from the Methodist Church. The name of the new church, as suggested by Zamora, would be Iglesia Evangelica Metodista en las Islas Filipinas (Evangelical Methodist Church of the Philippines). The name featured both the Evangelical and Methodist nature of the planned church.

=== After the schism ===
On 28 February 1909, Zamora delivered a sermon before calling to the members to secede from the Methodist Episcopal Church. In the Tondo church alone, 669 of the 749 members joined the schism. Overall, 1,500 of the 30,000 members joined the secession. Zamora, along with other Filipino ministers who joined the schism, withdrew their respective ministries from the Methodist Church. The Iglesia Evangelica Metodista en las Islas Filipinas was founded, making it the first indigenous Protestant church in the Philippines. Seeing the developments among Protestant lines, Bishop Aglipay offered Zamora a high position in the Philippine Independent Church, which had more than two million members by the time. Zamora turned down the offer, which led to Isabelo de los Reyes to describe him as:

A man who was not swayed by the attraction of pomposity, even of honor, who did not fall to the temptation of power, who dedicated his life in order to gain the full freedom of Philippine Methodism.

– Honorary Bishop Isabelo de los Reyes of the Philippine Independent Church.

== Serving the new church ==
Evident lack of evangelists, preachers, financial resources and physical facilities did not hinder Zamora to carry on the preaching of the Gospel. In the First Ministerial Conference of the new Filipino Church in 1910, Zamora was elected as the first General Superintendent of Iglesia Evangelica Metodista en las Islas Filipinas. He was responsible for the initial membership campaign strategy of the Church, which covered 12 of the 50 provinces in the Philippines. Besides the church in Manila, Zamora had founded the churches in Bataan, Nueva Ecija and Rizal.

== Death ==
On 1 September 1914, Zamora fell ill during the height of his ministry. He was advised by his physicians, Doctors Papa and Ramirez to rest in his home in Bulacan, but his condition did not improve. He left this message to the church leaders and members:

Abide in your faith and obey the Gospel of Jesus. Love the Church of the Lord as you have seen me love her. Persevere in your responsibilities as loyal Christians and servants of the Lord Jesus, for a man’s honor lies in his fulfilment of his responsibilities.

Finally, on 14 September 1914, Zamora died at the age of 39. He left a church of 11,000 to 11,500 members. Alejandro Reyes succeeded him as General Superintendent.

== Honors ==
After his death, Zamora was referred to as the following:

- Martin Luther of the Philippines
- John Wesley of the Philippines
- Apostle Paul of the Brown Race
- The foremost leader of religious liberty in the Philippines

In honor of Rev. Nicolas Zamora's service to the Church as founder and first General Superintendent, a resolution was passed in the General Conference of 1956 authorizing the conferment of the title of Bishop posthumously. On his 42nd death anniversary, 14 September 1956, then General Superintendent Bishop Lazaro G. Trinidad officially confered the title in a ceremony attended by thousands of faithful of the IEMELIF Church. Leaders and dignitaries of other churches were also present.

He was also recognized as the first Filipino Protestant minister in the Philippines, as well as founder of the first indigenous Protestant Church in the Philippines. In the 80th year of Methodism in the Philippines (1979), the Supreme Award Plaque was posthumously awarded to Zamora by the National Committee on the 80th year of Methodism in the Philippines for being an "evangelist, preacher, orator, teacher, nationalist, and defender of religious liberty." On 18 October 1980, Sande Street in Tondo, Manila was renamed in his honor. On 14 September 2014, Zamora's death centennial was commemorated by the Iglesia Evangelica Metodista en las Islas Filipinas. In the same year, plans were laid by the Church to build a Leadership Center named after him.

== See also ==
- Iglesia Evangelica Metodista en las Islas Filipinas
