= Northern Christian College =

Christian college in Ilocos Norte, Philippines

Northern Christian College, Inc.
- Former name: Northern Luzon Christian College (1933-1946)
- Motto: "The Institution for Better Life"
- Type: Private, Christian higher education institution
- Established: June 10, 1933; 93 years ago (as Northern Luzon Christian College, Inc)
- Religious affiliation: INOCAG-ISU Christian Fellowship, Christian Church (Disciples of Christ)
- Chairperson: Dr. Mary Lu B. Magno, MD FPOGS
- President: Lucris Carina Agnir-Paraan
- Faculty: 150
- Students: Approx. 2000
- Location: Laoag City, Ilocos Norte, Philippines; 18°12′11″N 120°35′29″E
- Colors: Maroon and White
- Website: www.ncc.edu.ph

- Location in Luzon Location in the Philippines

Northern Christian College is a private Christian higher education institution in Laoag City, Ilocos Norte, Philippines. It was founded in 1933. It is associated with the Christian Church (Disciples of Christ) and the United Church of Christ in the Philippines. Baccalaureate programs are offered in the fields of liberal arts, ministry, nursing, teacher education, tourism, hospitality management, and business (finance, administration). Its graduate school offers a master's degree program in education and public administration, as well as a doctorate program in education. There are 120 members on the faculty, and student enrollment is approximately 2000.

== History ==
Northern Christian College, Inc. was first established as Northern Luzon Christian College in Vigan, Ilocos Sur in 1933. The college moved to Laoag City in 1943, but was closed the next year due to World War II. The school was reopened as Northern Christian College in 1946.

== Academics ==
In 2007, NCC registered approximately 2000 undergraduate and graduate students. All programs in offered by NCC are recognized by the Commission on Higher Education (CHED) and range from degrees (A.B., B.S., M.S., M.A., and Ph.D.) in several disciplines including:

- Accountancy
- Commerce
- Education
- Business management
- Nursing
- Political science
- Public administration
- Social welfare
- Theology
- Hotel and restaurant management

== Religious Affiliation ==
The college is affiliated with the Christian Church (Disciples of Christ) in the United States, the INOCAG-ISU Christian Fellowship whose local churches are known as the Church of Christ Disciples and the United Church of Christ in the Philippines.
