= United Church of Christ in the Philippines =

Christian denomination

- Type: United church
- Classification: Mainline Protestant
- Orientation: Methodist, Evangelical and Reformed elements
- Scripture: Protestant Bible
- Polity: Mixed polity with Congregational, Presbyterian, and Connexional elements
- General Secretary: Bishop Joseph G. Agpaoa
- Chairman: Jessie D. Garcia
- Associations: World Communion of Reformed Churches; World Council of Churches; World Methodist Council; National Council of Churches in the Philippines; Disciples Ecumenical Consultative Council
- Region: Philippines
- Headquarters: 877 EDSA West Triangle, Quezon City, Metro Manila 1104
- Origin: April 26, 1901 (officially May 25, 1948); Malate, Manila
- Merger of: Evangelical Church of the Philippines; United Evangelical Church; Philippine Methodist Church; Tagalog Convention of the Christian Church (Disciples of Christ)
- Congregations: 2,564 (estimate as of 2008)
- Members: 470,792 - 1,500,000
- Tertiary institutions: 20
- Seminaries: 6
- Official website: uccpchurch.com

The United Church of Christ in the Philippines (UCCP; Filipino: Ang Nagkaisang Iglesia ni Cristo sa Pilipinas; Ilocano: Nagkaykaysa nga Iglesia Ni Cristo iti Filipinas) is a mainline Protestant denomination in the Philippines. Established in its present form in Malate, Manila, it began as a uniting church after the merger of the Evangelical Church of the Philippines, the Philippine Methodist Church, the Disciples of Christ, the United Evangelical Church and several independent congregations.

In 2021, the UCCP reported to the World Council of Churches that it had 1,500,000 adherents, with 1,593 pastors in 2,564 congregations as of 2008. As per the 2020 census, there are 470,792 members in the Philippines alone. Its headquarters is located at 877 EDSA, West Triangle, Quezon City, Metro Manila.

== History ==
=== The Evangelical Church ===
In April 1901, Presbyterians in the Philippines invited missionaries of other evangelical churches to a conference to discuss the possibility of working together in the proclamation of the gospel of faith alone as the only way of salvation for Filipino Catholics, Muslims and pagans. Representatives included those from the Methodist Episcopal Church, (Note: Currently known as The United Methodist Church since 1968 when the Evangelical United Brethren merged with The Methodist Church) the United Brethren in Christ (UBC), (Note: Currently known as The United Methodist Church since 1968 when the Evangelical Church merged with the United Brethren and later merged with The Methodist Church) the Northern Baptist Church, (Note: Currently known as the Convention of Philippine Baptist Churches, Inc.) the Christian and Missionary Alliance, the Free Methodist Church, the British and Foreign Bible Society, the American Bible Society, and the Presbyterian Church.

The Evangelical Union was then formed on April 26, 1901. The evangelical churches agreed to call themselves “The Evangelical Church” (with the original denomination name in parentheses below it). From 1898 to 1905, these mission churches joined in the agreement:

- Methodists (1898; most of lowland Luzon and north of Manila)
- Presbyterians (1899; Bicol, Southern Tagalog area, and some parts of Central and Western Visayas)
- Baptists (1900; Western Visayas)
- United Brethren (1901; Mountain Province and La Union)
- Christian Churches and Churches of Christ/Disciples of Christ (1901; Ilocos, Abra, and Tagalog towns)
- Congregationalists (1902; Mindanao, except for the western end)
- Christian and Missionary Alliance (1902; Western Mindanao and the Sulu Archipelago)

Manila was open to all denominations and mission agencies. The Seventh-day Adventist Church and Episcopalians did not join because they wanted to cover parts of the country already allocated to other groups.

=== The United Evangelical Church ===
The United Evangelical Church was founded in 1929 as a merger into a singular organization of the Presbyterian, Congregational, United Church of Manila and the United Brethren Churches.

=== The Philippine Methodist Church ===
After the foundation of the Iglesia Evangelica Metodista en las Islas Filipinas (IEMELIF) by Nicolas V. Zamora, a second major split occurred in the Methodist Church on March 23, 1933. About three years before, Melecio de Armas, a prominent minister had been accused by his colleagues of immorality towards a teenaged girl who was a church member. At the 1932 Philippine Annual Conference, a committee found the minister guilty and recommended his expulsion from the ministry, but the minister appealed the decision to the Appellant Committee of the General Conference of the Methodist Church of the Philippines (GCMCA). This Committee decided that it does not have enough evidence against the minister, so it acquitted him—thereby overturning the decision of the Philippine Conference. This brought to everyone's attention the subordinate position of the Philippine church. Bishop Herbert Welch, at the 1933 Annual Conference, declared the matter closed, and reinstated the minister.

As a result, a group led by Samuel Stagg, pastor of the influential Central Church (now Central United Methodist Church on T.M. Kalaw), and including five other missionaries and 27 ordained Filipino ministers led by Cipriano Navarro and Melquiades Gamboa, a University of the Philippines professor, left the church and declared themselves the General Conference of the Methodist Church in the Philippine Islands (GCMCPI). All but 41 members of Central Church left their newly dedicated gothic cathedral. This group formed the Philippine Methodist Church, with Navarro as bishop. The church financially supported the Staggs and the other missionaries who joined it. Stagg and his group formed the Cosmopolitan Church, which became the leading congregation of the new denomination. The independent GCMCPI elected Navarro as acting General Superintendent. In 1948, the Philippine Methodist Church was a constituent part in forming the United Church of Christ in the Philippines.

=== The Evangelical Church in the Philippines ===
The Evangelical Church in the Philippines (福音教会) was formed in 1943 under the direction of the Japanese Imperial Forces. It brought together the United Evangelical Church; the Christian Churches and Churches of Christ (Disciples of Christ); the Iglesia Evangélica Unida de Cristo; the Iglesia Evangélica Metodista en las Islas Filipinas (IEMELIF) founded by Bishop Nicholas Zamora; the Iglesia Evangélica Nacional; the Philippine Methodist Church; some Seventh-day Adventists and other churches. It was the first such union of churches under full Filipino leadership.

After World War II, former Presbyterians and Congregationalists reconstituted the United Evangelical Church. On the other hand, the former United Brethren in Christ, together with the Church of Christ (Disciples of Christ) and the independent congregations remained as the Evangelical Church in the Philippines. Since the Seventh-day Adventists were forced into the merger by the Japanese, they immediately left the Evangelical Church of the Philippines after the war.

=== The United Church of Christ in the Philippines ===
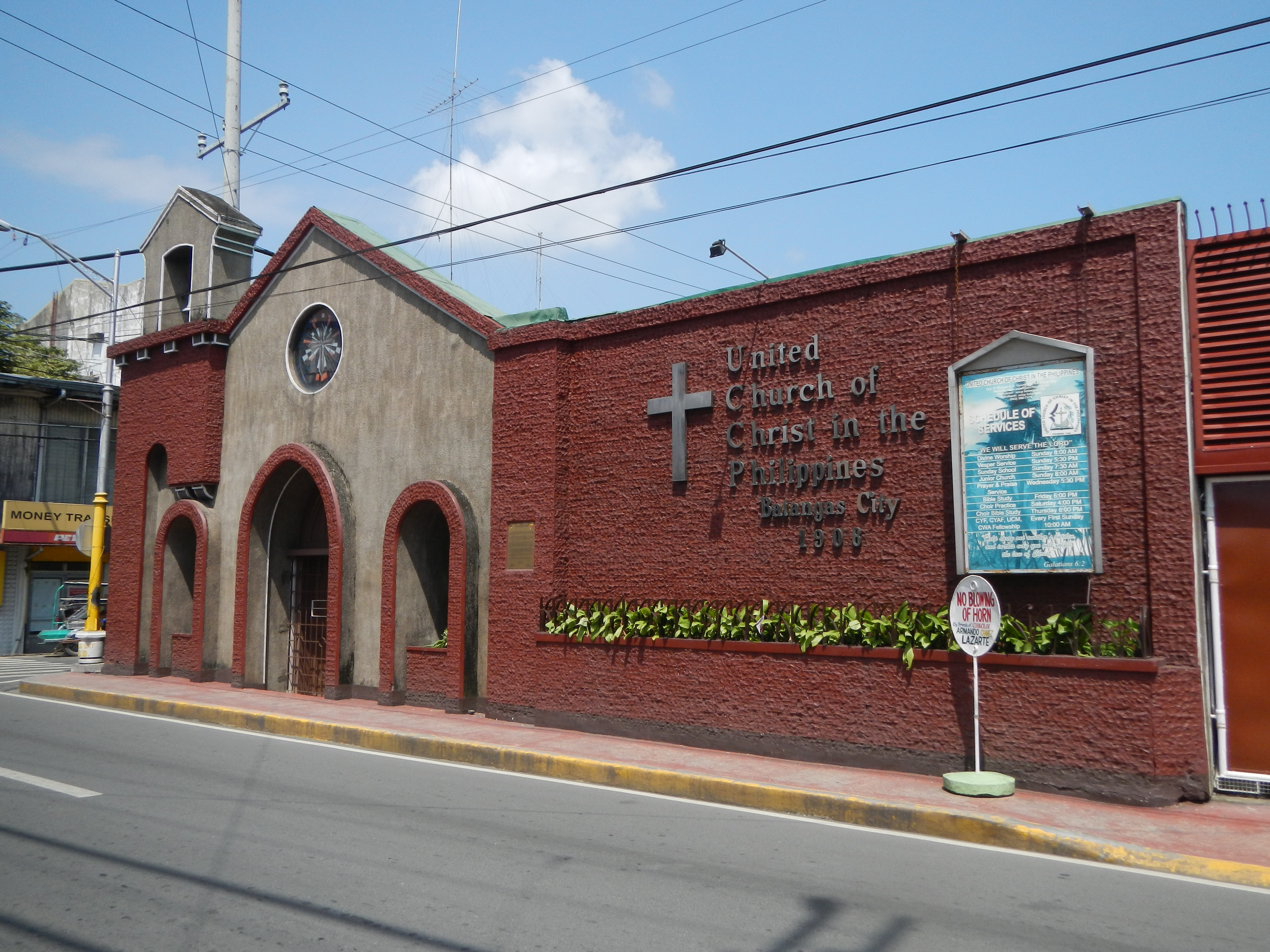
A United Church of Christ in the Philippines congregation in Batangas City

In May 1948, the United Evangelical Church, the Philippine Methodist Church, the Evangelical Church of the Philippines, some congregations of the Iglesia Evangélica Unida de Cristo, the Convention of the Christian Church (Disciples of Christ) of Northern Luzon, the Iglesia Evangélica Nacional, and some congregations of the Iglesia Evangélica Metodista en las Islas Filipinas (IEMELIF) joined to form the United Church of Christ in the Philippines. Enrique Sobrepeña of the United Evangelical Church served both as Bishop for Luzon and as the first Presiding Bishop.

This was the real culmination of the efforts of the Evangelical Union established by missionaries on April 26, 1901, to seek the evangelization of the Philippines through a common effort. In spite of the refusal of the United Methodist, Baptist and other independent evangelical churches, the UCCP was known to be the most visible sign of interdenominational and church unity in the Philippines.

In 1962, the conservative Tagalog Convention of the Christian Church (Disciples of Christ) decided to join the union of the United Church of Christ in the Philippines. It was proclaimed in an appropriate ceremonies at the General Assembly held in Cebu City. In 1998, Nelinda Primavera–Briones was the first woman elected bishop of the United Church of Christ in the Philippines.

== Faith and practice ==
The United Church of Christ in the Philippines is trinitarian and believes in the deity, humanity, and atonement of Jesus. It believes that the Christian Bible, in both the Old (Hebrew Bible) and New Testaments, is the inspired Word of God and that salvation is by grace through faith, repentance, and following Jesus's teachings. The United Church of Christ in the Philippines views the Christian life as one of personal faith and serious dedication to living according to the highest Christian precepts. Each person is thus to be born again, converted into a new life, and gathered into the church community. For adherents, the church is essentially the result of conversion and of grace, a gathered community of committed believers. It is not the mother of Christian experience or the source (rather than the effect) of grace, as in the Roman Catholic tradition. The church is, therefore, holy only because the faith and life of its people are holy.

The UCCP traces its roots in the Protestant Reformation, when Martin Luther, John Calvin, and others led the movement to reform Christianity. This is often expressed in the "Five Solas"—God's grace alone as the only way to be reconciled to God, faith alone as the only means of receiving God's grace, Jesus alone as the ground of God's saving grace, scripture alone as the only infallible authority for belief, and God's glory alone as the ultimate purpose for the lives of men and women.

The following distinguishes the UCCP from other communions:

- The primacy it gives to Scripture in matters of faith, doctrine, and morals;
- Its respect for freedom of conscience and responsible Christian witness, and its resistance to undue interference by any civil or ecclesiastical authority;
- The authority it accords to the congregation, exercised through its participatory and representative system of church governance;
- Its concern for justice, peace, human dignity, and the integrity of creation in political, social, and economic life; and
- Its active involvement and commitment to ecumenical and interfaith relations as an expression of its witness to Christian unity and social transformation.

=== Sacraments ===
The church believes there are only two sacraments: baptism and the Lord's Supper (Eucharist). The church takes a neutral position on observing feet washing, considering the various traditions brought in by the uniting churches. The 1948 Article III Historic Faith and Message states, "We do preserve all the heritage of faith brought into the union by each of the constituent churches and hereby declare as our common faith and message: 'Jesus Christ, Son of the living God, our Lord and Saviour.'""

==== Baptism ====
The UCCP defines baptism as a sacrament of initiation into the church. It believes that baptism is not a means of salvation but a first step of obedience for the new believer. The church permits both believer's baptism and infant baptism. Infant baptism is administered only to infant children of church members as a sign of God's covenant of mercy. In recent times, infant baptism has given way to infant Pághahandóg (Filipino, "dedication") ceremonies, thus reserving baptism when the child can consciously decide to follow Jesus. The church also recognises and accepts baptisms held in other Christian churches.

Disciples understood baptism as a confessional expression of faith and repentance, rather than a "work" that earns salvation. Thus, they insisted that a believer's baptism is a necessary part of conversion and necessary for its validity. Local churches in the Tagalog and Ilocano regions established by their missionaries practice only baptism by immersion for adult initiates.

==== Lord's Supper ====
The Church believes in the symbolic presence of Jesus in the Lord's Supper (Filipino: Santa Cena, Banál na Hapunan, both meaning “Holy Supper”). They believe that it was given by Jesus to his church as a way of remembering and proclaiming the sacrifice he made on the cross. It is a sacrament that contains an element of remembering and proclaiming Jesus's death while at the same time looking forward to the time when they will enjoy communion with Jesus in Heaven. It involves solemn and serious self-examination. This includes confession of sin and repentance. Communion for them should not be received flippantly or carelessly. It is the joyful feast of the Lord; hence, it is a celebration.

Each UCCP congregation is required to celebrate the sacrament of the Lord's Supper once a month. In most local churches, communion is served on the first Sunday of the month. The observance of the rite of Jesus's last supper with his disciples is done every Maundy Thursday. Since the Disciples of Christ custom is to have the Lord's Supper central to every worship service, the sacrament is administered every Lord's Day.

=== Contemporary issues ===
The church believes that every man or woman should be accepted and treated with dignity, grace, and holy love, whatever their sexual orientation (ie, biological sex of person attracted to whom one is attracted). In 2014, the denomination voted to adopt a policy that "means that LGBTs should not be discriminated but should be unconditionally accepted...[and] Bishop Marigza confirms the openness to ordain openly gay and lesbian church workers." In 2016, the Iloilo Ekklesia congregation in Mandurriao, Iloilo City, held the Church’s first LGBT-themed worship service.

The church has also allowed the ordination of women with full rights of clergy based on biblical principle: "There is no longer Jew or Greek, there is no longer slave or free, there is no longer male and female; for all of you are one in Christ Jesus." The UCCP, along with some other evangelical Churches, holds that when the historical contexts involved are understood, a coherent biblical argument can be made in favor of women's ordination.

== Worship services ==
Worship in the United Church of Christ in the Philippines (UCCP) reflects both its Reformed and ecumenical heritage. While the denomination provides common liturgical resources, local congregations enjoy considerable freedom in the ordering and style of worship. Services typically include the reading and proclamation of Scripture, prayer, congregational singing, the offering, and the celebration of the sacraments. Musical styles range from traditional Protestant hymns and choral music to contemporary worship songs, depending on local preference and context. Some congregations follow a more formal liturgical order, while others employ less structured forms of worship. In recent decades, the use of contemporary worship music, multimedia presentations, and modern musical instruments has become increasingly common in many congregations, particularly in urban areas.

== Mission, evangelism, and social concern ==
The United Church of Christ in the Philippines has, historically, been a leading Protestant denomination in mission work. A vital part of the world mission emphasis of the denomination is building and maintaining relationships with Evangelical, Protestant and other churches around the world. Connection between evangelism and social concern was maintained by the UCCP. In 1952, the UCCP established the UCCP National Federation of Credit Unions to aid farmers. They also issued a Resolution Condemning Gambling and Liquor. Sobrepeña approved, a relationship between the UCCP and the Orient Crusades (OC) International - Philippine Crusades. OC entered the Philippines agreeing to work in cooperation with UCCP leaders, to prepare converts for membership in the UCCP, and to avoid controversial doctrinal issues. They focused on mass evangelism and witness to students, and used film showings such as King of Kings to make contacts. Interested seekers availed of Bible correspondence courses. Sobrepeña held mass evangelistic campaigns—notably in Laoag in November 1955, with the OC cooperation.

In 1973 to 1986, local churches allowed American missionaries from the Youth With A Mission to reorganize Sunday schools and set up Sunday school programs. This international, interdenominational Christian missionary organization also promoted Christian movies in secular theaters throughout the archipelago. Many Filipinos from this time are in full-time Christian service today or are productive Christians. In addition, a number of indigenous churches were established among squatter communities in Metro Manila, in Baguio, and villages in the Cordillera. The Philippine arm of Campus Crusade for Christ, an international interdenominational movement, began and helped increase church attendance and membership.

Some local churches joined international fellowship, such as the Covenant Global Church. Other churches involved themselves into the Evangelism Explosion, a ministry that trains people how to share their faith in Christ.

The United Church of Christ in the Philippines in Baguio is an active member of the Philippine Council of Evangelical Churches (PCEC). PCEC is the largest network of denominations, churches, mission groups and para-church organizations in the Philippines being involve in evangelism and defending the fundamental evangelical Christian faith.

== Statistics ==
Year	Members
1990	902,446
2000	416,681
2010	449.028
2020	470,792

In 1990, the denomination had 902,446 members, according to the national census.

In 2021 the church reported to the World Council of Churches that it had 2,564 congregations, 1,593 pastors, and about 1,500,000 members as of 2008.

However, in the following years, the church declined. The 2020 Census found only 470,792 members.

== Seminaries and affiliated institutions ==
The denomination maintains affiliations with various Protestant seminaries across the Philippines:

- College of Theology of Northern Christian College in Laoag, Ilocos Norte
- College of Theology of Southern Christian College in Midsayap, Cotabato
- Divinity School at Silliman University in Dumaguete
- Ecumenical Theological Seminary in Baguio
- Pag-asa School of Theology of Brokenshire College in Davao City
- Union Theological Seminary in Dasmariñas, Cavite (in partnership with the United Methodist Church)

=== Universities and colleges ===
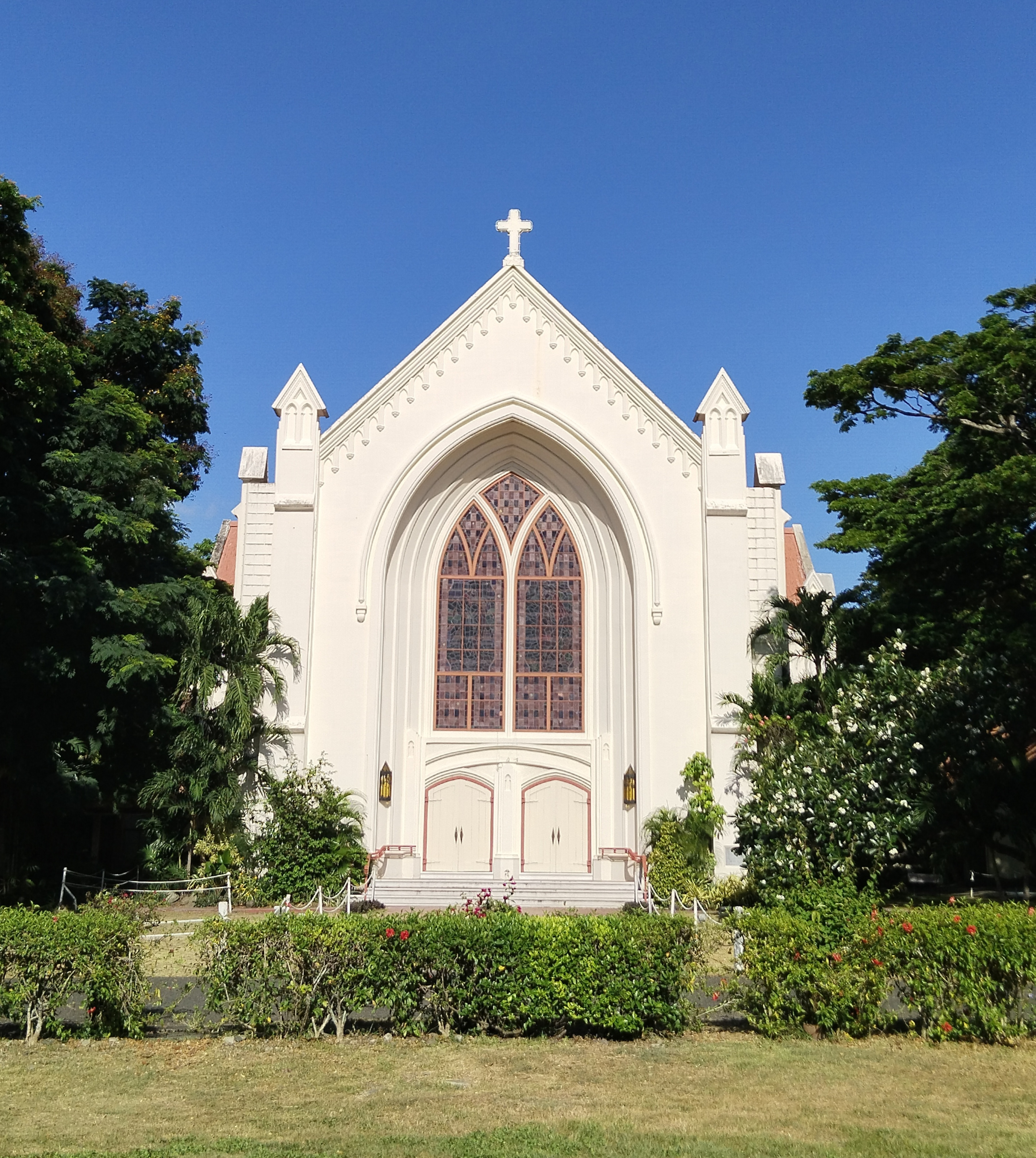
Silliman University

- Apayao Community Learning Center in Kabugao, Apayao
- Brokenshire College in Davao City
- The College of Maasin in Maasin City, Southern Leyte
- Dansalan College Foundation in Marawi, Lanao del Sur
- Farmers Institute in Bonifacio, Misamis Occidental
- Ifugao Academy in Kiangan, Ifugao
- Jimenez Bethel Institute in Jiménez, Misamis Occidental
- Kalinga Academy in Lubuagan, Kalinga
- National Heroes Institute in Kananga, Leyte
- Northern Christian College in Laoag, Ilocos Norte
- Philippine Christian University in Malate, Manila (in partnership with the United Methodist Church)
- St. Tonis College in Tabuk, Kalinga
- Silliman University in Dumaguete
- Southern Christian College in Midsayap, Cotabato
- Tabuk Institute, Kalinga
- Union Christian College in San Fernando, La Unión
- United Institute, Inc. in Daraga, Albay
- Pilgrim Christian College, Cagayan de Oro
- Hinunangan Bethel Christian School, - Hinunangan, Southern Leyte
- Mindanao Institute, Cabadbaran, Agusan del Norte
- United Institute, Incorporated - Sagpon, Daraga, Albay

=== Affiliated health care institutions ===
- Bethany Hospital in San Fernando, La Unión
- United Shalom Hospital (formerly Bethany Hospital) in Tacloban, Leyte
- Brokenshire Medical Center (formerly Brokenshire Memorial Hospital) in Davao City
- Silliman University Medical Center Foundation Inc. in Dumaguete
- VisayasMed Hospital (formerly Visayas Community Medical Center) in Cebu City

=== Affiliated service institutions ===
- CONDORA in Damortis, La Unión
- Haran House in Davao City
- NLJA Peace Center
- Shalom Center in Malate, Manila
- UCCP CENDET (Center for Education and Development) in Cebu City

== Partners in Mission ==
The UCCP is a member of the National Council of Churches in the Philippines. Currently, the UCCP has covenant relations ("partnership convenant") with the Iglesia Filipina Independiente, the Episcopal Church in the Philippines and the Iglesia Unida Ekyumenikal.

Aside from this, the UCCP is a member and has partnership relations with international religious organizations.

=== World and Continental Church Bodies ===
- World Council of Churches
- World Alliance of Reformed Churches
- World Methodist Council
- Church Mission Society
- Christian Conference of Asia

Sister-church relationships are held with the following churches abroad which hold to similar doctrine and practice.

=== North America ===
- Christian Church (Disciples of Christ)
- Presbyterian Church (USA)
- Reformed Church of America
- United Methodist Church
- United Church of Christ
- United Church of Canada

=== Asia and Australia ===
- Presbyterian Church of Korea
- Presbyterian Church of the Republic of Korea
- Presbyterian Church in Taiwan
- Uniting Church in Australia
- United Church of Christ in Japan

=== Europe ===
- Evangelical Church in Rhineland
- United Evangelical Mission
- Equmeniakyrkan Sverige (Uniting Church in Sweden)

== Prominent members ==
- Fidel V. Ramos, 12th President of the Philippines
- Jovito Salonga, former president of the Senate of the Philippines.
- Sonny Belmonte, Speaker of the House of Representatives, former mayor of Quezon City
- Betty Go-Belmonte, founder of The Philippine Star
- Rufino Macagba, Sr., founder of Lorma Medical Center
- Crispina Lorenzana-Macagba, co-founder of Lorma Medical Center
- Leticia Ramos-Shahani, first female Senate President Pro Tempore
- Narciso Ramos, former Secretary of Foreign Affairs
- Camilo Osías, former Senate President.
- Neptali Gonzáles, former senator
- Juan Flavier, former senator
- Orly Mercado, former senator and former RPN 9 president and general manager, now hosting "Orly Mercado: All Ready" at Radyo5 92.3 News FM
- Amelita Ramos, former First Lady
- William Padolina, president of National Academy of Science and Technology, former secretary of the Department of Science and Technology
- Ricardo Gloria, former secretary of education, former secretary of the Department of Science and Technology
- Benito Vergara, national scientist
- Teodoro Rafael Yangco, founder of the YMCA of the Philippines
- Angel C. Álcala, Ramon Magsaysay Awardee for Public Service, former secretary of the Department of Environment and Natural Resources
- Perfecto Yasay, Jr., former Secretary of Foreign Affairs and former chairman of the Securities and Exchange Commission
- Leonor M. Briones, former presidential adviser for social development, former secretary of education, former national treasurer and now center director, SEAMEO Regional Center for Educational Innovation and Technology (SEAMEO INNOTECH)
- Roel Degamo, former governor of Negros Oriental
- Nathanael S. Santiago, Bayan Muna secretary general and former Caloocan councilor

=== Prominent former members ===
- Félix Y. Manalo, pastor and evangelist of the Church of Christ (Disciples). Subsequently, left and became the first Executive Minister of the Iglesia ni Cristo (Church of Christ).

== See also ==
- Protestantism in the Philippines
- National Council of Churches in the Philippines
