= Knox United Methodist Church =

United Methodist church in Manila, Philippines

Coordinates: 14°36′23″N 120°58′57″E

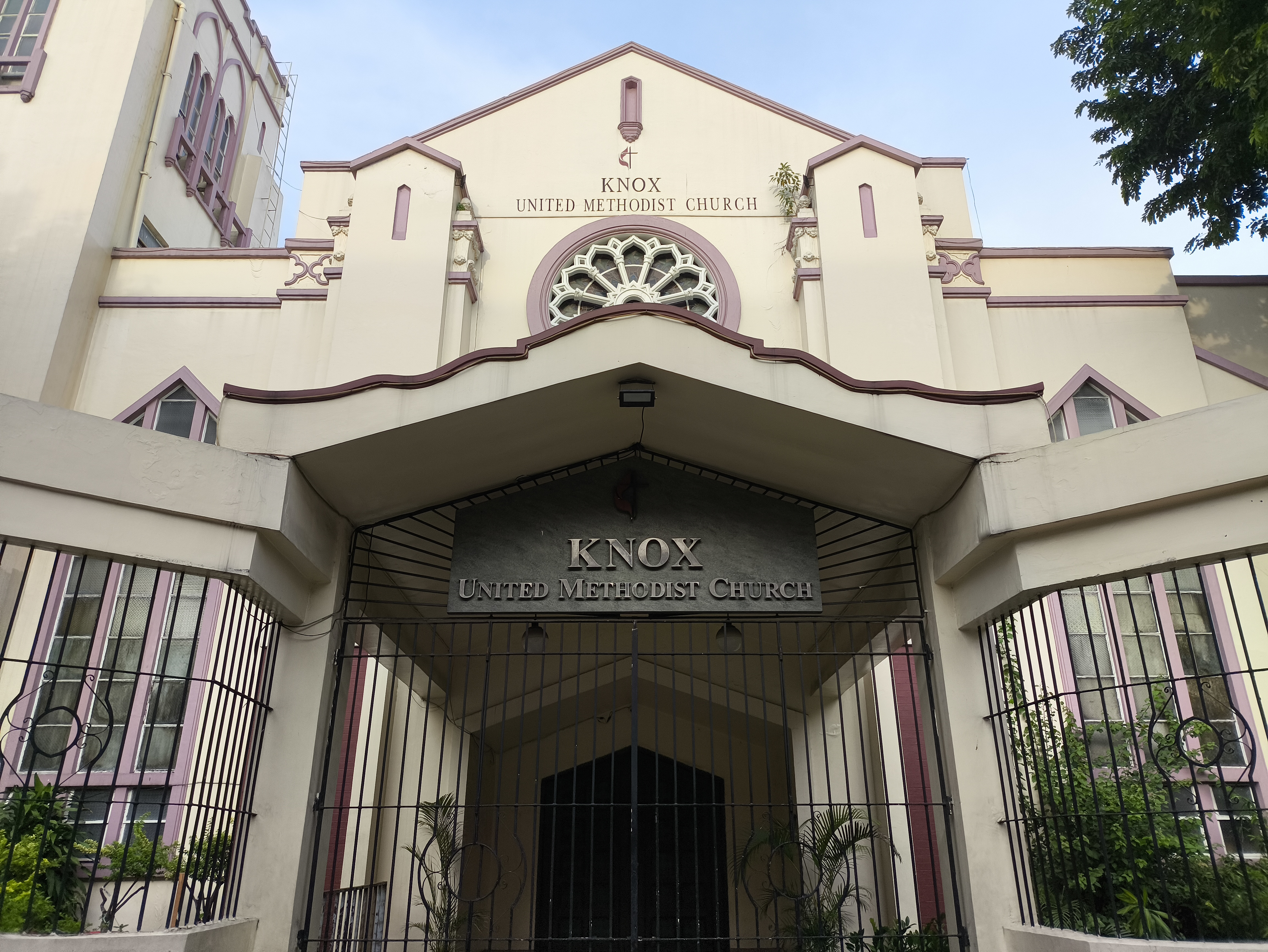
Entrance of the Knox United Methodist Church

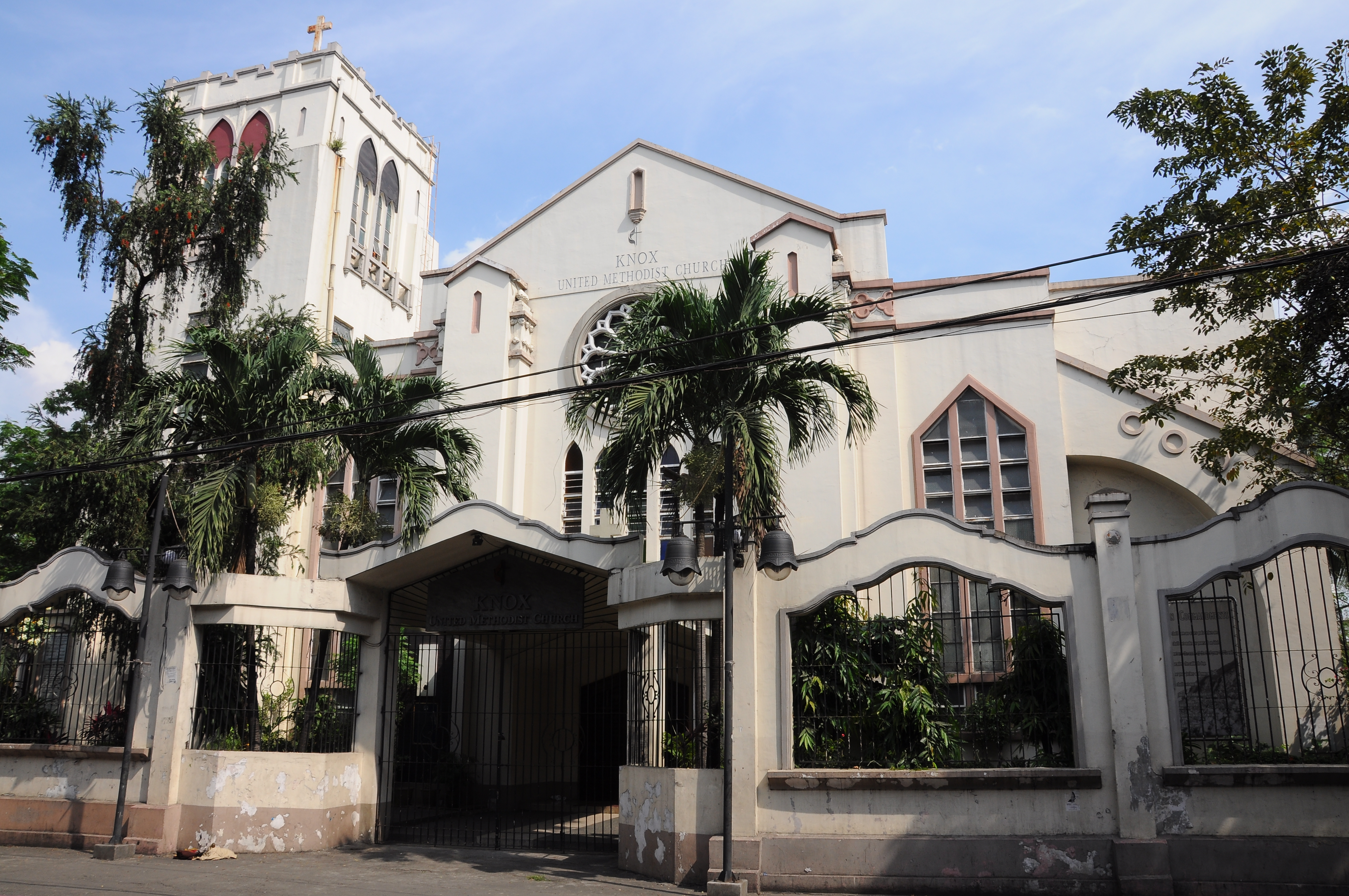
Facade of the Knox United Methodist Church

Knox United Methodist Church is known to be the first Filipino United Methodist Church in the Philippines located along Rizal Avenue in Santa Cruz, Manila.

== History ==
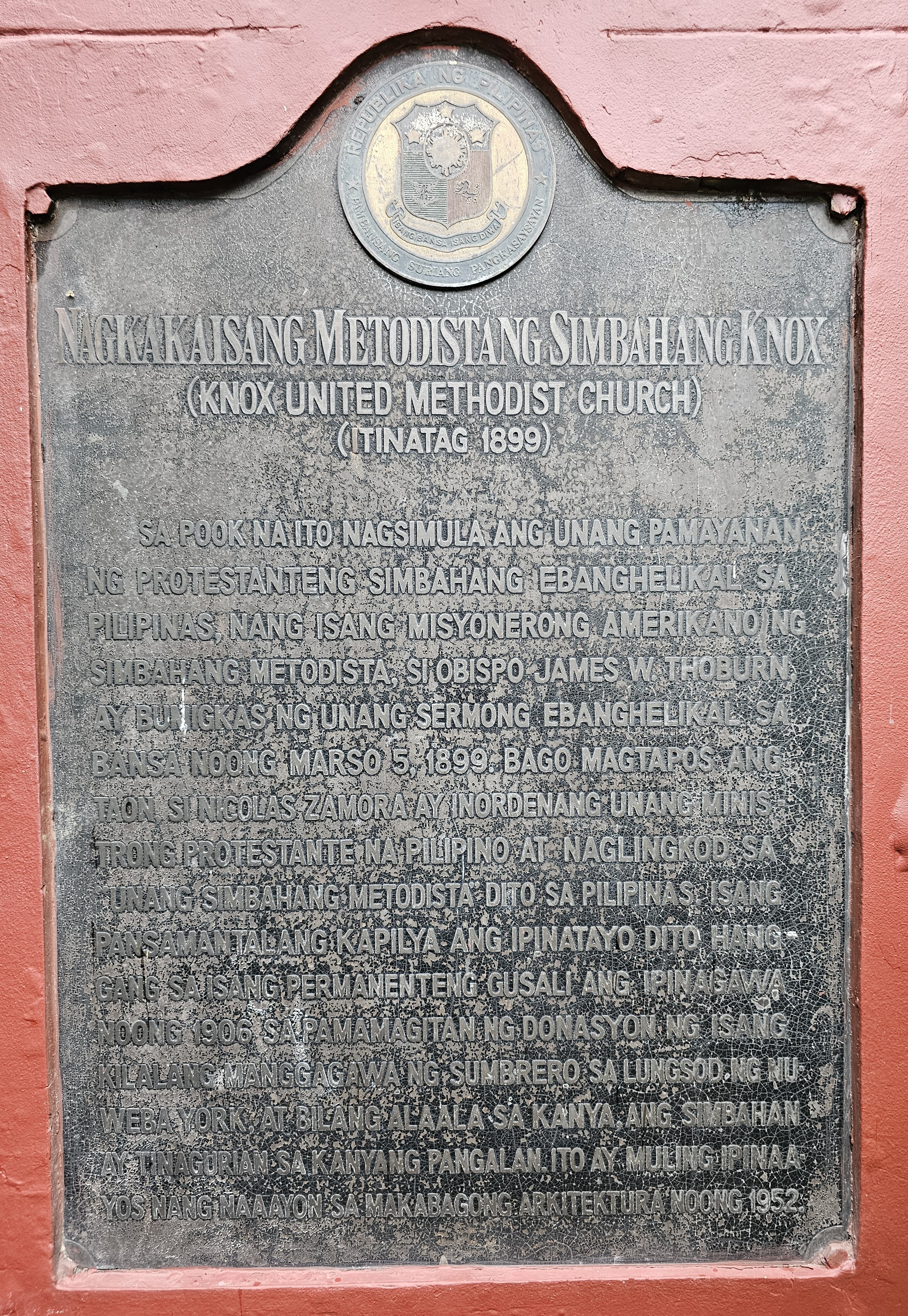
National historical marker installed on the church facade

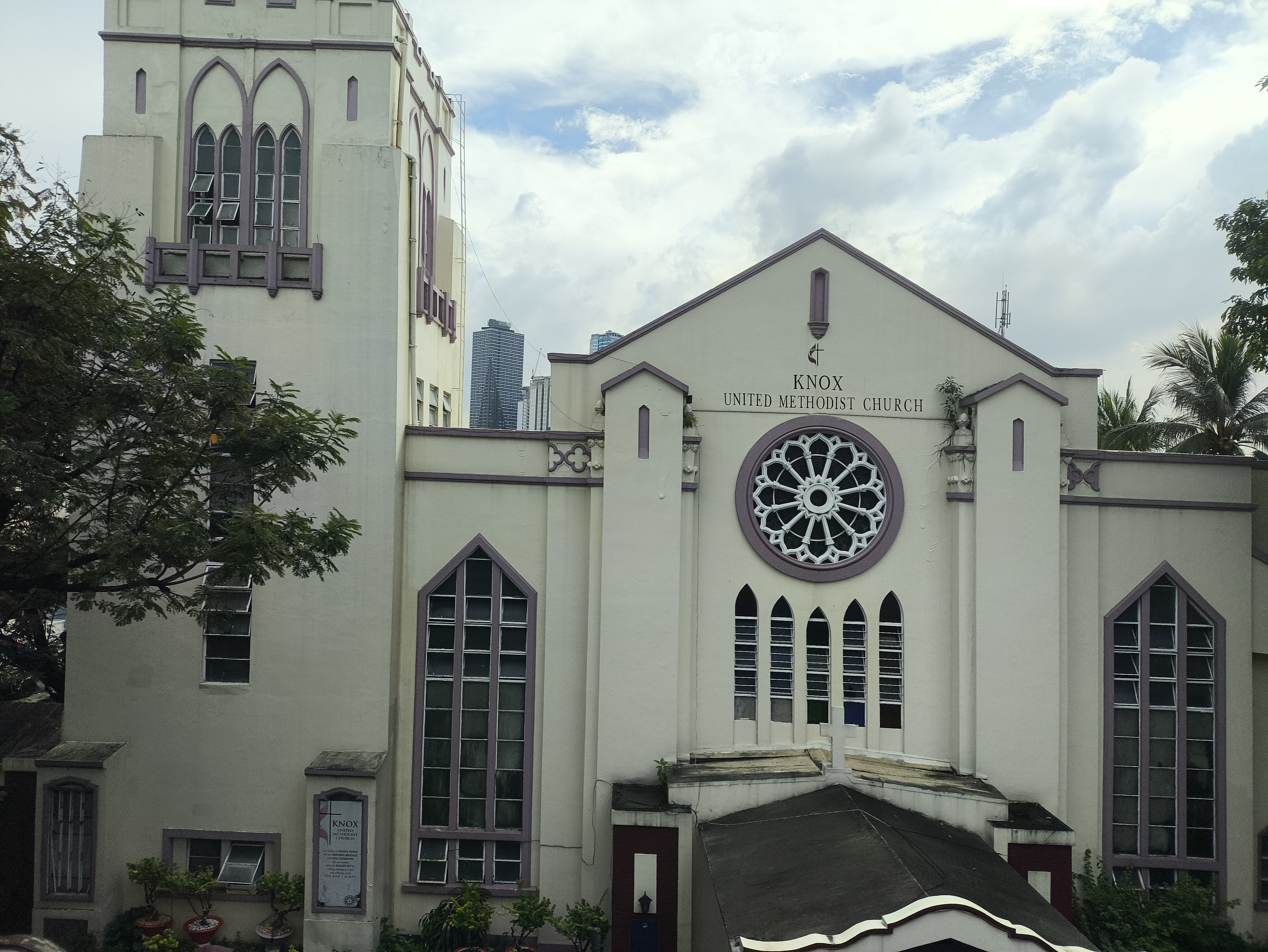
Knox United Methodist Church as seen from the LRT Line 1 (Doroteo Jose Station).

The first Protestant worship service in the Philippines was held in Manila on August 28, 1898, officiated by Rev. George C. Stull, a Methodist chaplain and a member of the Montana Annual Conference. American and Filipino soldiers attended said service. In March 1899, Bishop James M. Thoburn visited Manila and organized a Methodist group into a charge affiliated with the Singapore District of the Malaysia Mission Conference.

=== Early years ===
Formerly known as the Knox Memorial Church, the church evolved into two worshiping congregations, the English congregation under Arthur Prautch and the Spanish congregation under Nicolas V. Zamora.

Knox UMC was also the first permanent Methodist structure built in the Philippines. The Philippine government donated large parcel of land at Calle Cervantes (Rizal Avenue) in Manila where a small chapel was built, known as the Cervantes Methodist Church. In 1906, a large permanent church structure was built under the supervision of Reverend M.A. Rader, the same site where Knox UMC presently stands. The church was first named as "First Methodist Church", and the original cornerstone bears its name. It was changed to Knox Memorial Methodist Church, named after a well-known businessman who spearheaded the church construction and donated $15,000.

=== World War II ===
Knox remained a Filipino Church, not until the liberation of Manila in 1945 between the Allied and Japanese troops. The Central United Methodist Church was totally destroyed by the war and its congregation was transferred to Knox that formed the Knox-Central Church. During this time, the English service congregation grew rapidly. In 1949 Central UMC was re-established at its original site in T.M. Kalaw Street, Manila.

=== Another milestone ===
The second half of the 20th century marked as striking increase in Knox UMC's membership. Thus, this required a bigger space for worship. In 1948, plans were made for its reconstruction and the main sanctuary was completed first in 1953. Reconstruction underwent several phases because new facilities were added (especially for Sunday School), which was completed in 1964.

== Services and other activities ==
- Ilocano Service
- Tagalog Service
- English Service
- Aldersgate Service
- Vesper Service
- Midweek Service
- Youth Service
- Children's Worship
- Sunday School
- Bible Study

== See also ==
- The United Methodist Church
- Philippines Central Conference (United Methodist Church)
- Central United Methodist Church (Manila)
- Cornerstone United Methodist Church
