= Central United Methodist Church (Manila) =

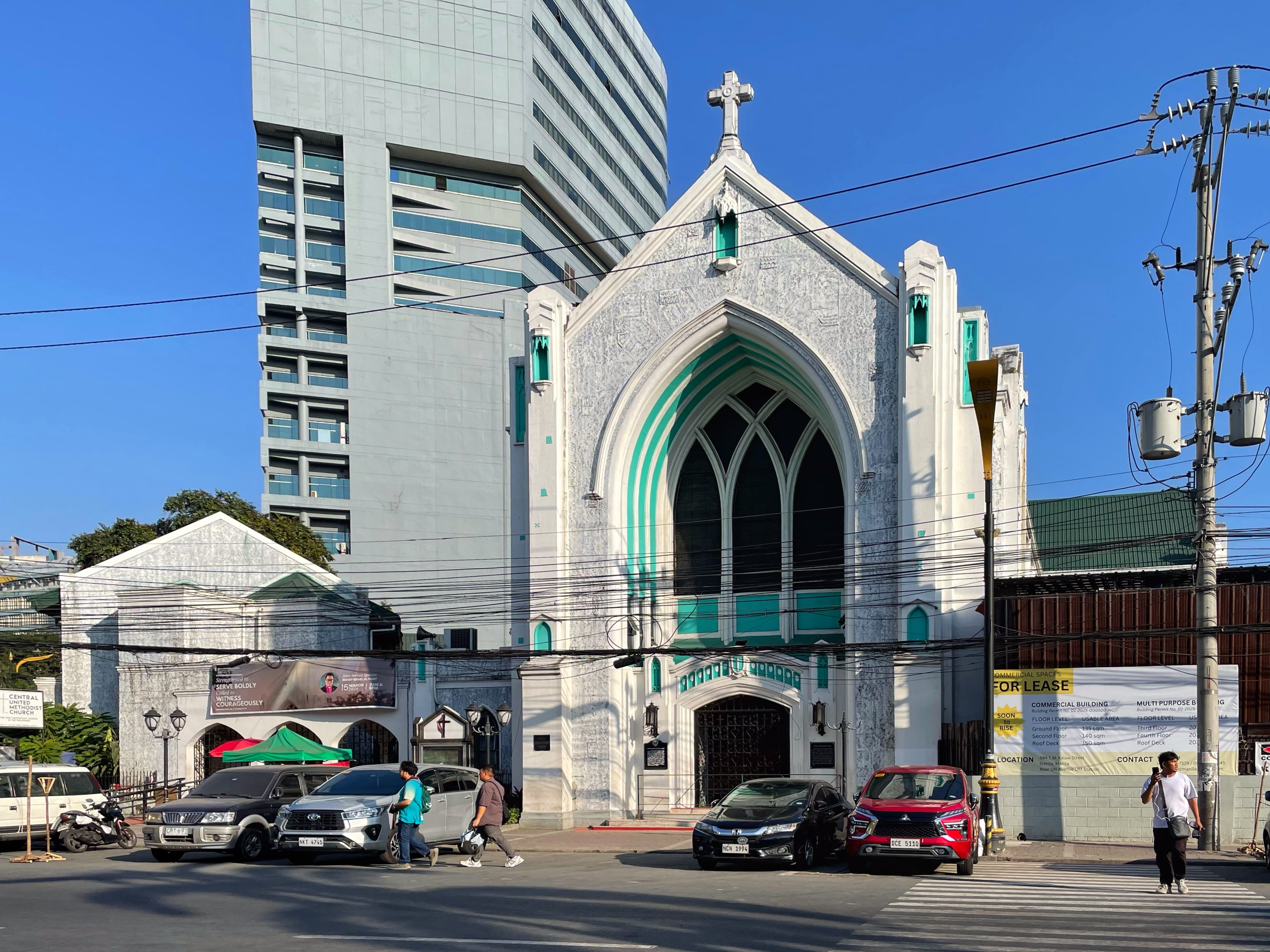
- Facade of the church in 2026

- Location within Metro Manila
- 14.582662°N 120.983586°E
- Location: Taft Avenue corner T.M. Kalaw Avenue, Ermita, Manila
- Country: Philippines
- Website: http://central-umc.tripod.com/myaf.htm

History
- Former name: Central Methodist Episcopal Church

Architecture
- Architect: Juan Arellano
- Style: Gothic Revival
- Completed: 1949

Central United Methodist Church is the first Protestant church in the Philippines, located along T.M. Kalaw Street in Ermita, Manila. Founded on 5 March 1899 during the American colonial period, it was originally named the Central Methodist Episcopal Church. The church was originally designed by Juan Arellano.

== History ==
The church's history is closely intertwined with that of Knox United Methodist Church, as both churches were the result of Filipino-American ties following the surrender of Manila in 1898. Thereafter, the first Protestant worship service in the Philippines was held on 28 August 1898. Officiated by the Rev. George C. Stull, the service was attended by both American soldiers and Filipino civilians.

During the Philippine–American War, the congregation separated from its American component, which transferred its services to the YMCA and was formally organized in 1899.

Its first chapel was completed on December 23, 1901, and was replaced by a stone structure in November 1906. In 1932, it was elevated to the status of a cathedral. During the Liberation of Manila in 1945, Central UMC was severely damaged and rendered unusable by fighting between combined American and Filipino troops and Japanese imperial forces. Its congregation temporarily reunited with Knox UMC until 1949, when Central UMC was rebuilt on its original site along T.M. Kalaw Street.

Since then, the membership of Central UMC has shifted from a predominantly American demographic to a mixed Filipino and American congregation.

== Location ==
The Central UMC is located at the corner of T.M. Kalaw Avenue and Taft Avenue in Manila, across from Plaza Olivia Salamanca.

== Notable congregants ==
- José Abad Santos, former chief justice and acting president of the Philippines, 1942
- Jorge Bocobo, former justice of the Supreme Court of the Philippines, 1942–44

== Gallery ==
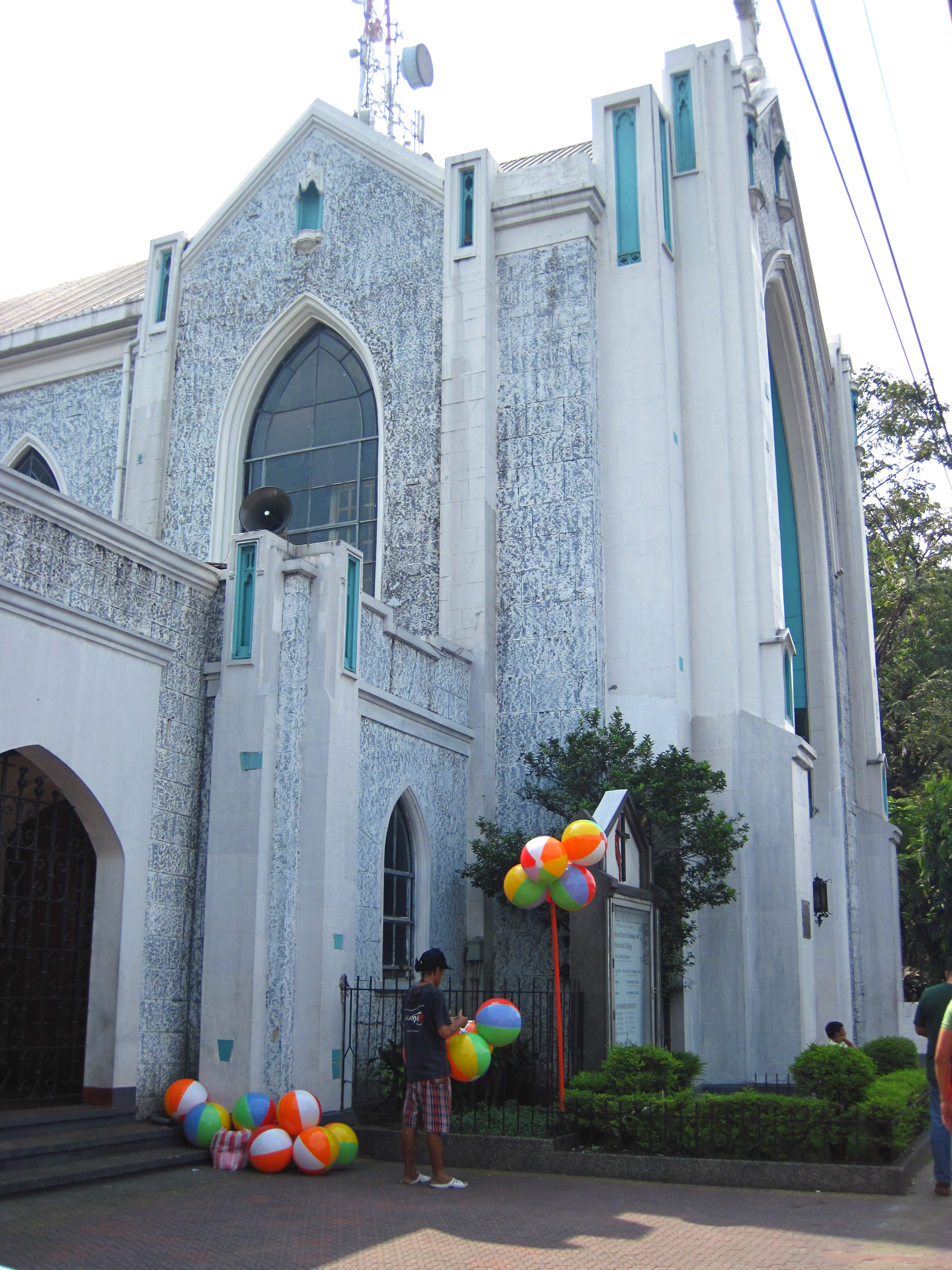
Left external side

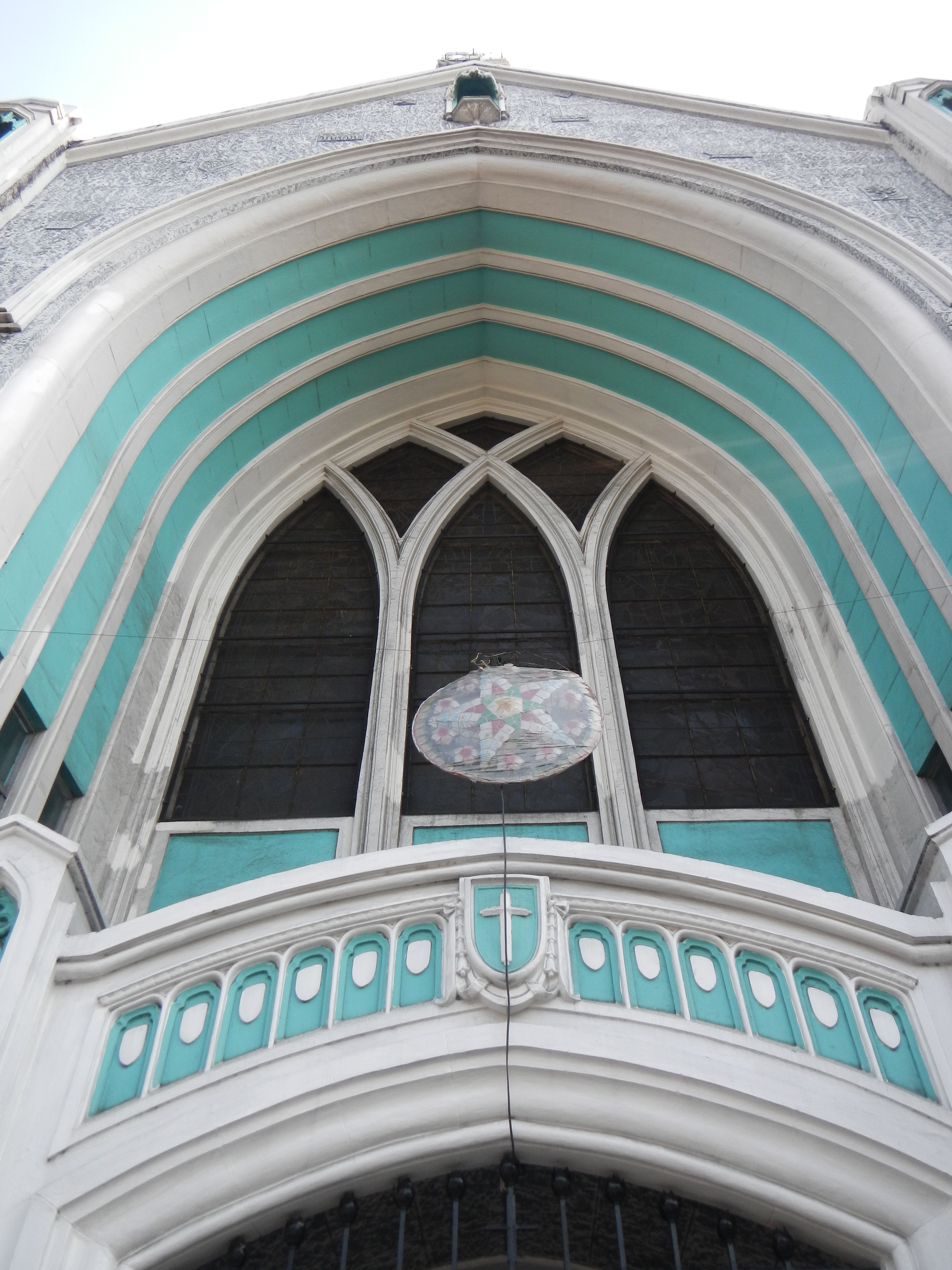
Details of the main arch window

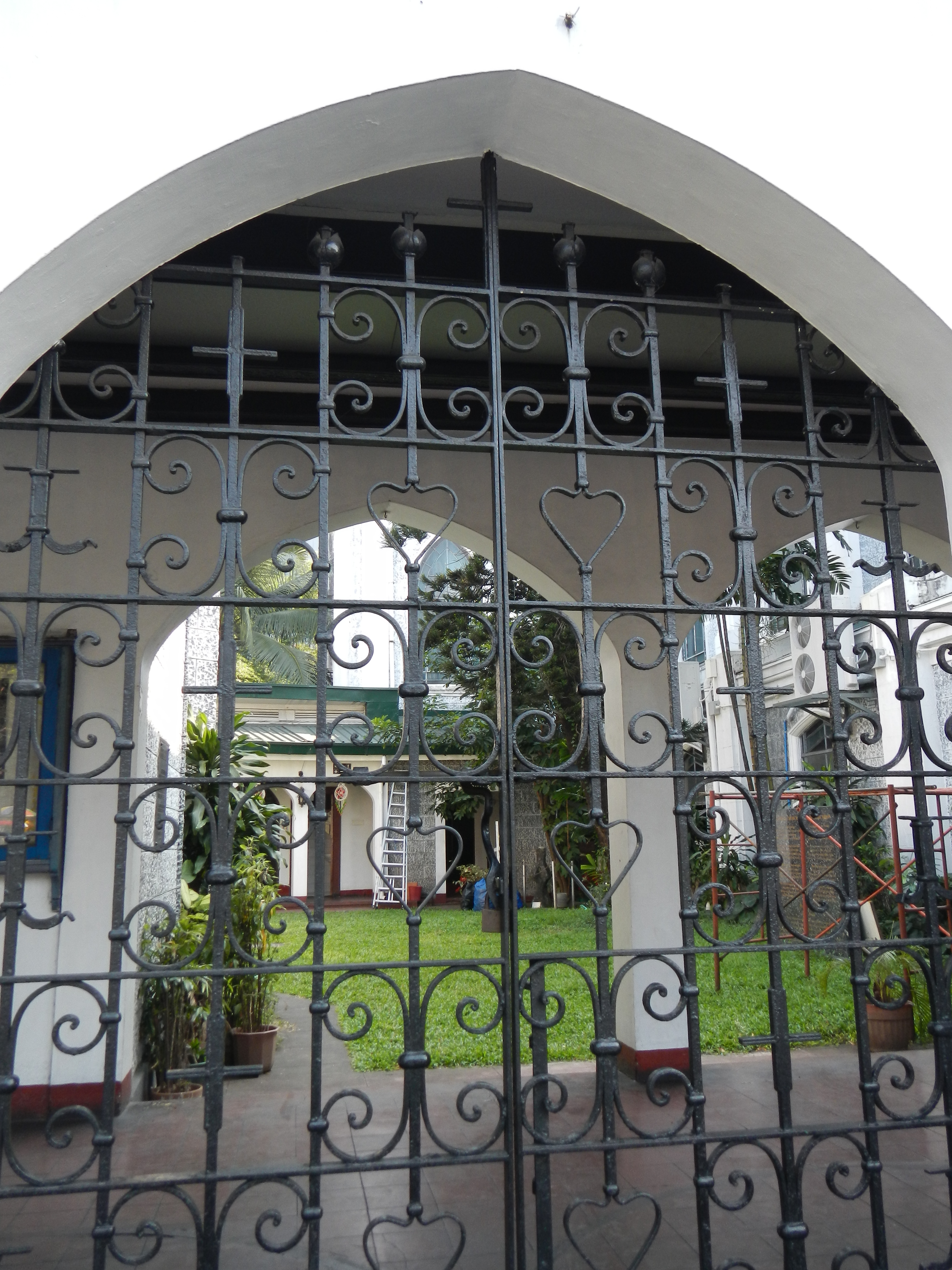
Details of the portal inside the church

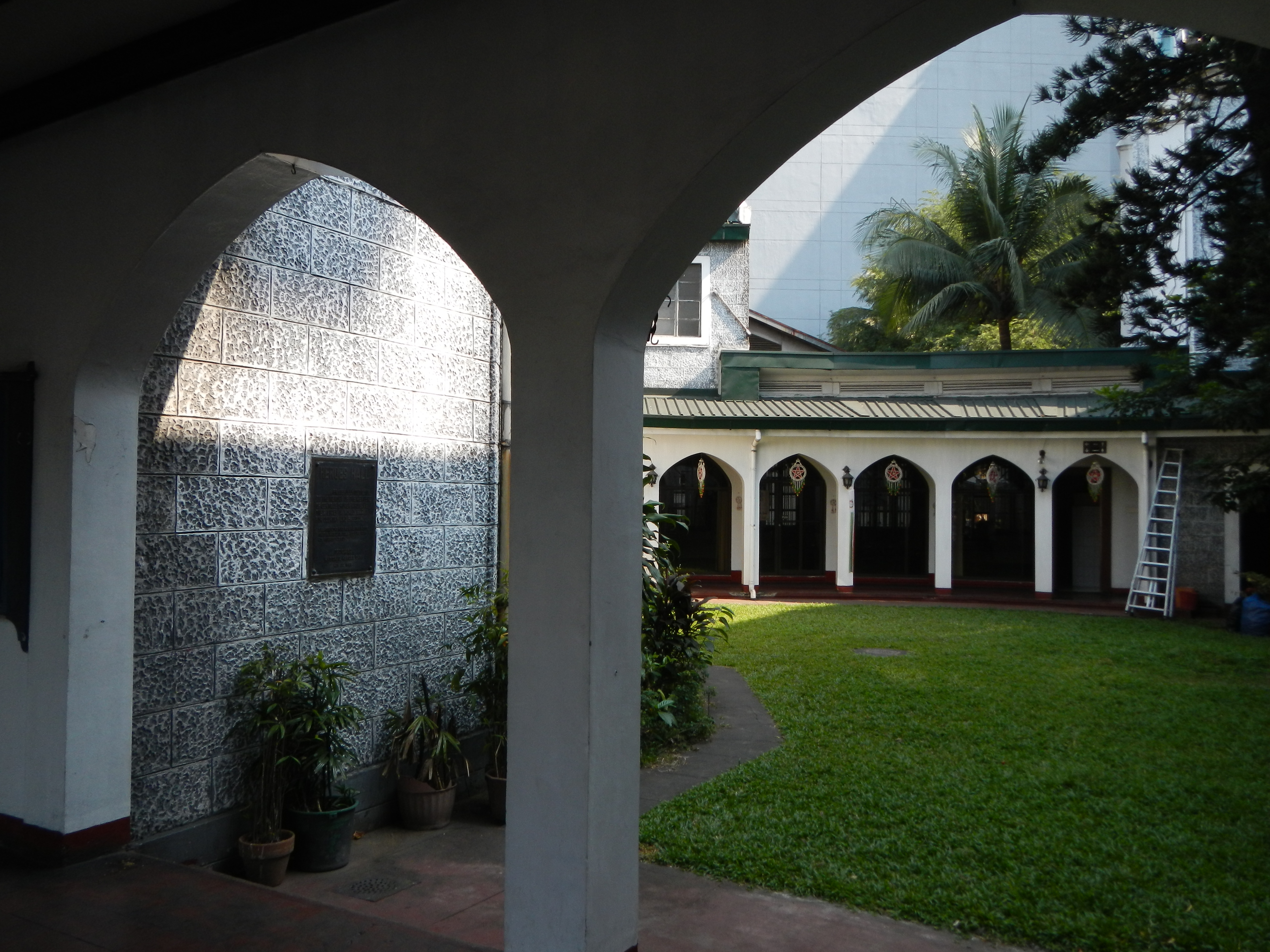
Gothic arches inside the church

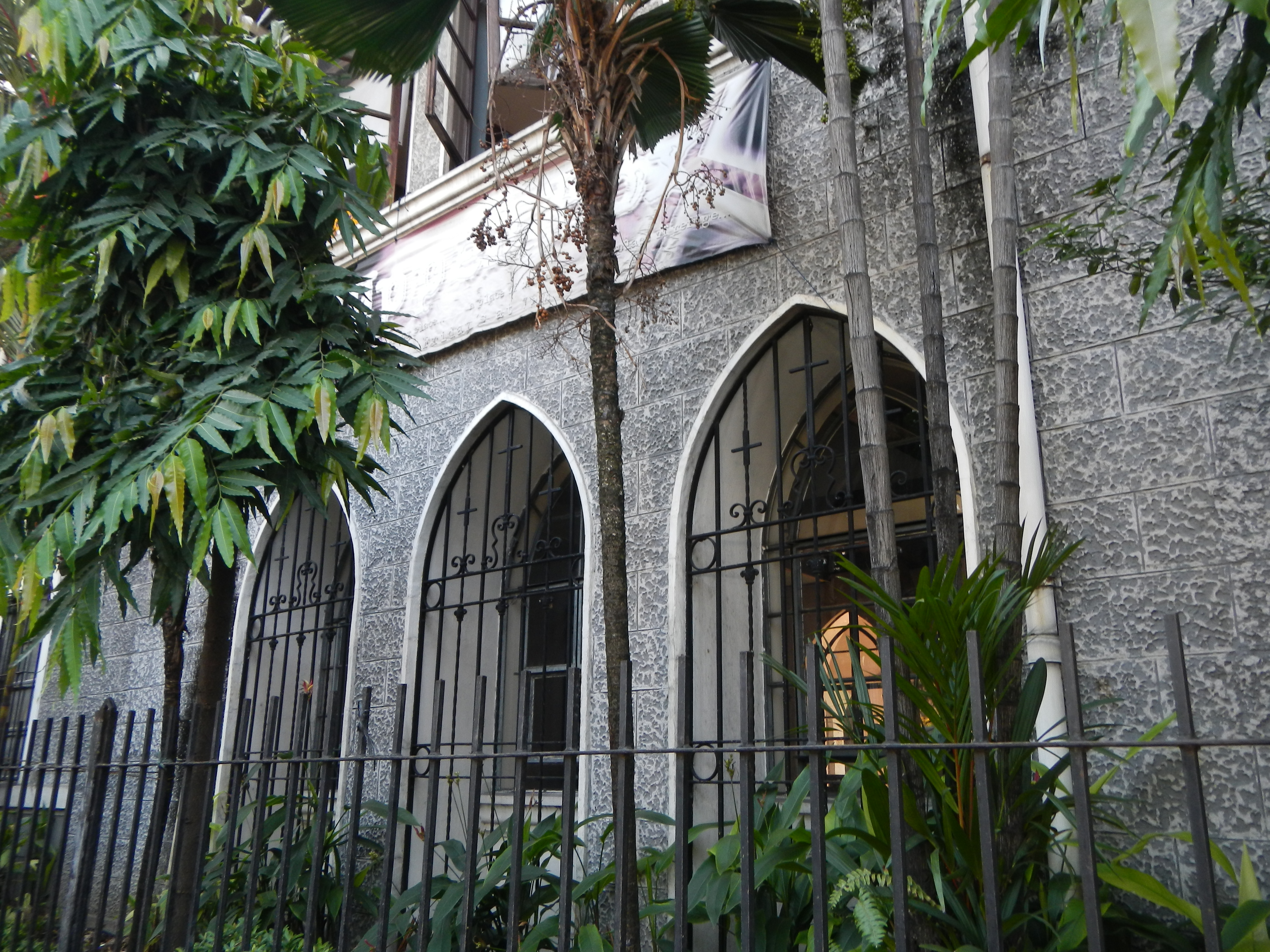
Gothic portals

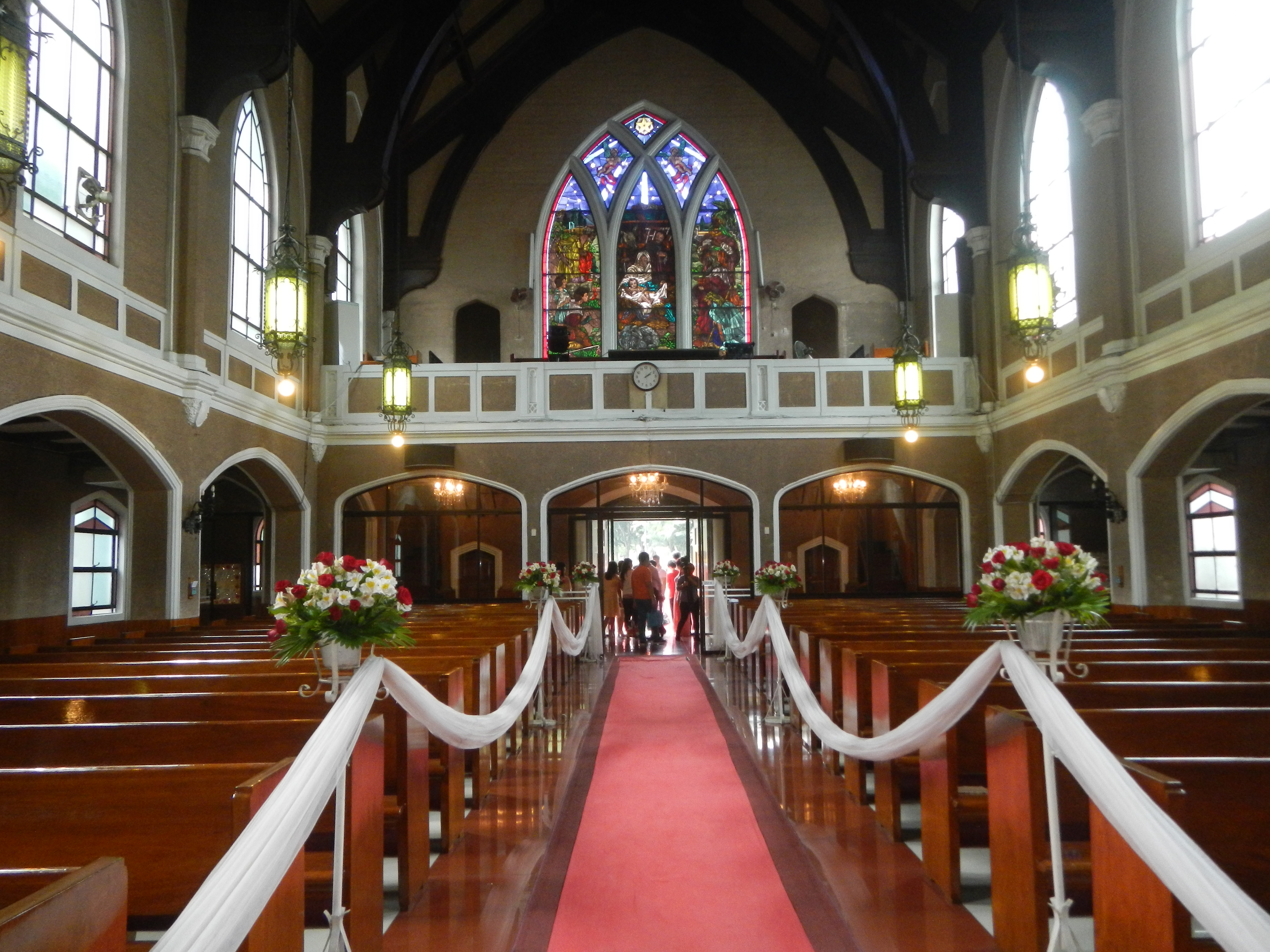
The nave

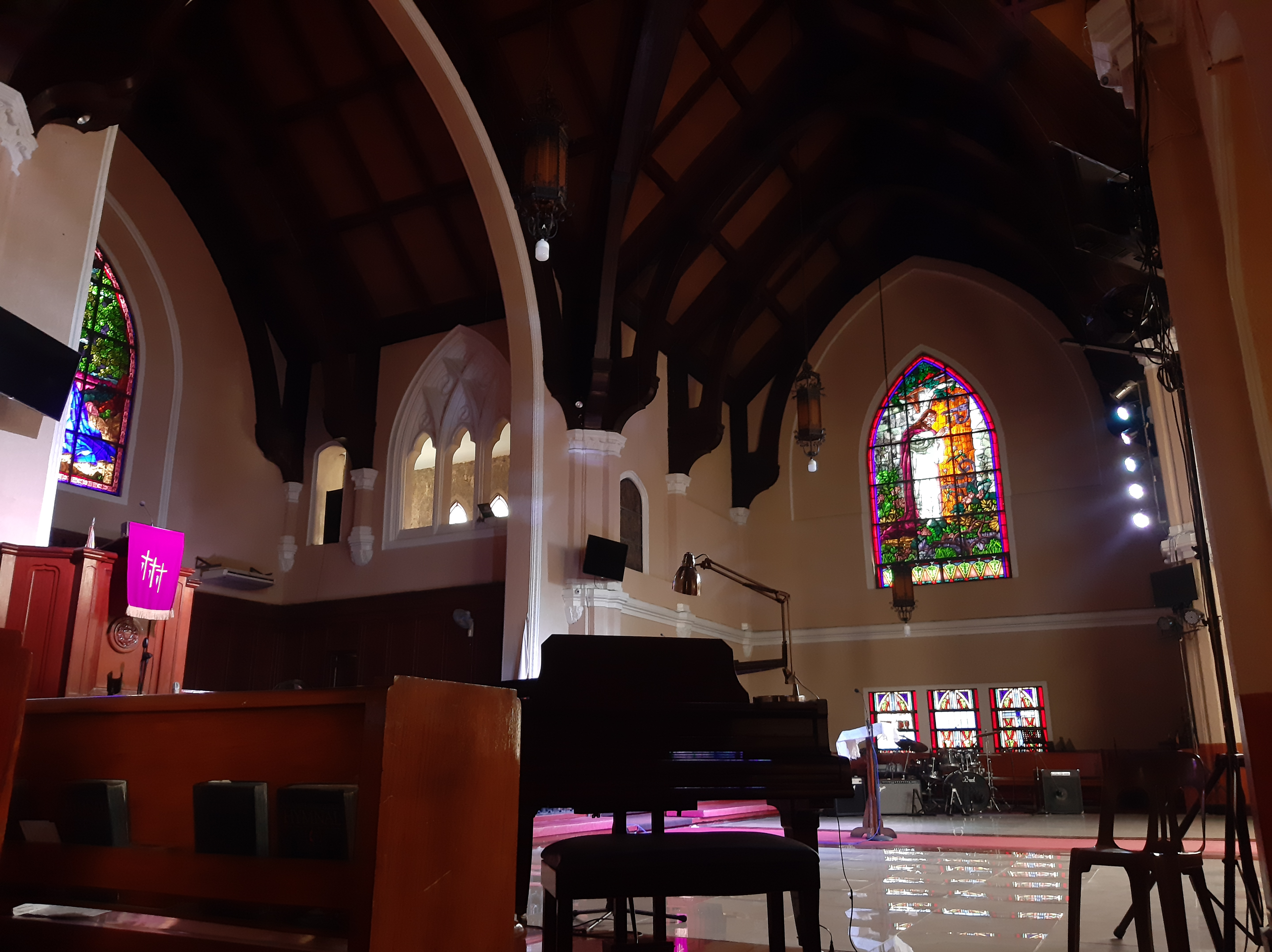
Transepts, crossing, and choir of the church

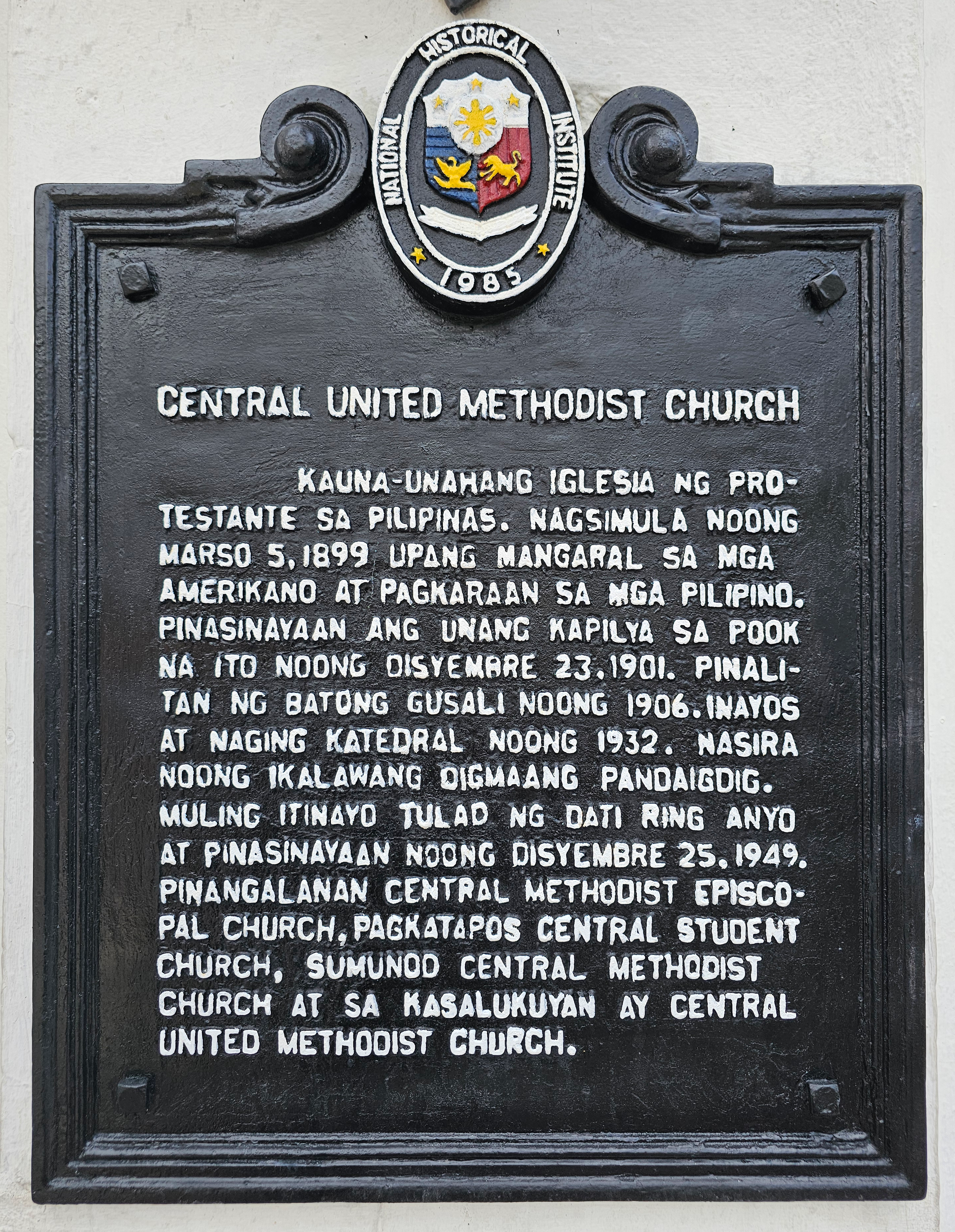
National Historical Commission marker in Filipino

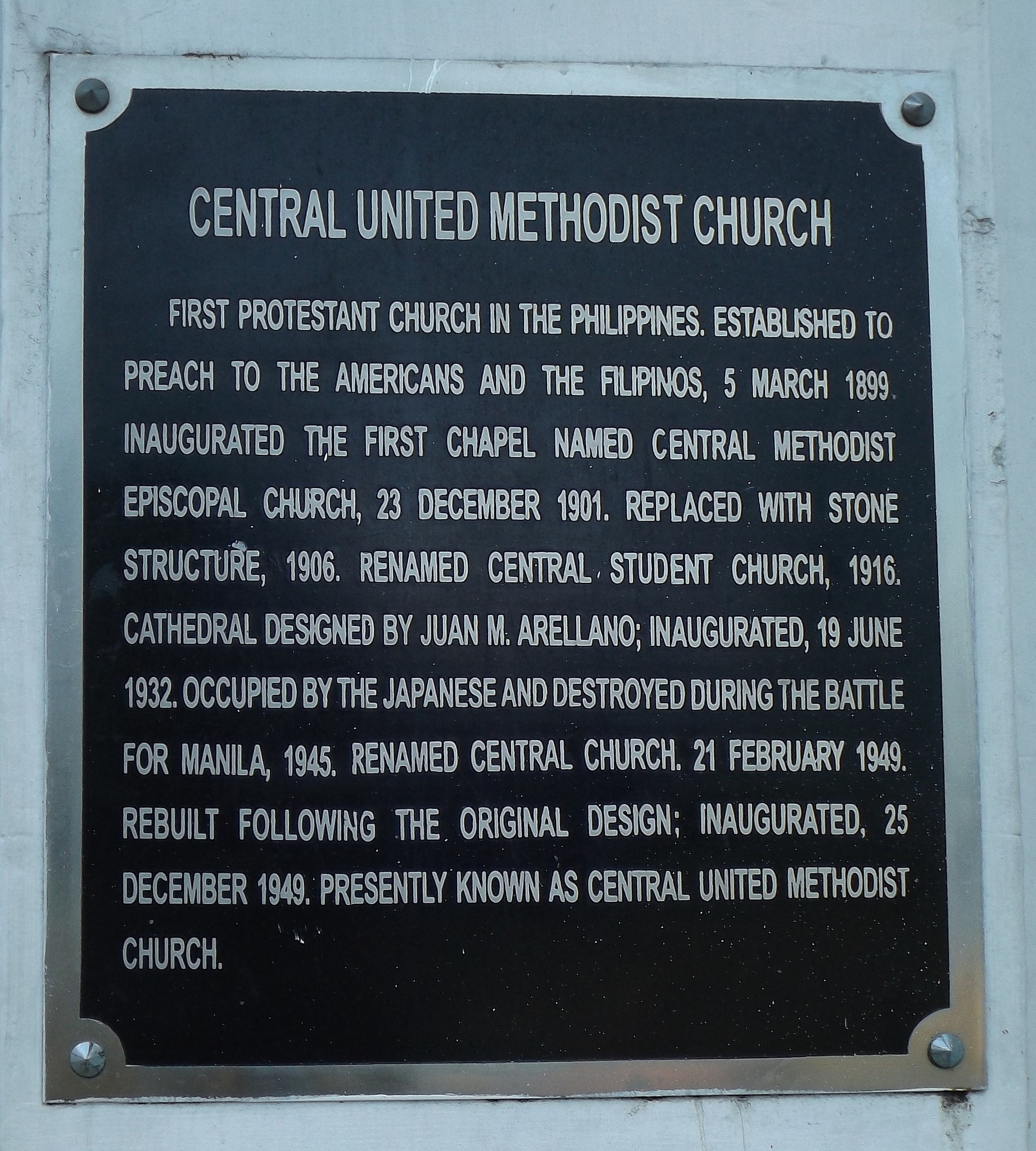
Marker in English

== See also ==
- Cosmopolitan Church
- The United Methodist Church
- Philippines Central Conference (United Methodist Church)
- Knox United Methodist Church
