= Brokenshire College =

Christian college in Davao City, Philippines

- Former name: Brokenshire School of Nursing (1954–1978)
- Motto: Fides et Servitium (Latin)
- Motto in English: Faith and Service
- Type: Private; Not-for-profit
- Established: 1954; 72 years ago
- Religious affiliation: United Church of Christ in the Philippines
- Chairman: Keith Arleigh D. Quebral, MBA
- President: Bishop Hamuel G. Tequis, MDiv.
- Vice-president: Dr. Felix C. Chavez Jr.
- Location: Davao City, Philippines; 7°01′53″N 125°29′47″E
- Campus: Suburban 14 hectares (140,000 m^{2})
- Website: www.brokenshire.edu.ph
- Location in Mindanao Location in the Philippines

Brokenshire College is a private, non-profit basic and higher education institution administered by the United Church of Christ in the Philippines (UCCP) in Davao City, Philippines. It was founded in 1954 as the Brokenshire School of Nursing and now offers programs in health sciences, theology, business, teacher training, medicine, as well as vocational and K–12 education. The college also administers two satellite campuses: one in Toril, Davao City and another one in General Santos.

The college is named after the Brokenshire Memorial Hospital, which is in turn named after Herbert Cecil Brokenshire, who served as the hospital's director from 1926 until World War II.

== History ==
In the 1900s, Protestant missionaries from the American Board of Commissioners for Foreign Missions (ABCFM) established a small bamboo-and-nipa clinic along Magallanes Street by the banks of Davao River. The clinic later became the Davao Mission Hospital and was the first congregational hospital in Davao City. In 1926, Herbert Cecil Brokenshire from New York City became the hospital director. In his 14-year supervision, the hospital improved its facilities and services. Doctor Brokenshire later died in World War II as a prisoner of war. In 1947, the rebuilt hospital was renamed Brokenshire Memorial Hospital in his honor. The United Church Board for World Ministries (UCBWM) (Note: Due to the merger of the Congregational Christian Church and the Evangelical and Reformed Church to form the United Church of Christ, the American Board of Commissioners for Foreign Missions (ABCFM) was merged with other missions to form United Church Board for World Ministries (UCBWM)) later handed the administration of the hospital to the United Church of Christ in the Philippines (UCCP) in 1951.

In 1954, the Brokenshire School of Nursing was established—the first nursing school in Davao City. However, the hospital along Magallanes Street burned down in the great fire of Davao City on February 10, 1964. In 1969 the hospital and nursing school transferred to their present site in Madapo Hills, Davao City. The Brokenshire School of Nursing was renamed Brokenshire College in 1978 after they began offering programs in liberal arts.

Brokenshire College opened its School of Medicine in 2016. In 2018, the medical school won the national Clinicopathologic Conference (CPC) competition.

== Academics ==
Brokenshire College offers nine bachelor's degrees and two master's degrees. Brokenshire also operates a medical school and offers vocational education as well as kindergarten through 12th grade.

- School of Allied Health

- BS in Medical Laboratory Science
- BS in Midwifery
- BS in Nursing
- BS in Pharmacy

- School of Arts and Science

- Bachelor of Elementary Education
- BS in Information Technology
- BS in Psychology
- MA in Nursing

- School of Business and Management

- BS in Business Administration

- UCCP Pag-asa School of Theology

- BA in Theology
- MA in Theology

- School of Medicine

- Doctor of Medicine

- Senior High School

- General Academic (GA) Strand

- Humanities and Social Sciences (HUMMS)
- Accountancy, Business and Management (ABM)
- Science, Technology, Engineering and Mathematics (STEM)

- Technical-Vocational-Livelihood (TVL) Track

- Home Economics (HE)
- Information and Communications Technology (ICT)

- Basic Education
- Kindergarten

== Campuses ==
=== Main campus ===
Emma Noreen Building

The main campus of Brokenshire College is situated on a 14-hectare lot in Madapo Hills, Davao City. The compound also houses the Brokenshire Memorial Hospital, Brokenshire Resource Complex, and the Brokenshire Community Health & Development Center.

=== Toril campus ===
Brokenshire College Toril is an extension campus located in the Toril district of Davao City. It was founded in 2003 and offers education from kindergarten through high school. In 2004, the campus opened a Bachelor of Science in Nursing program.

=== Soccsksargen campus ===
Brokenshire College Soccsksargen is located in General Santos in the Soccsksargen region. It was established in 2004. It offers a program in caregiving accredited by Technical Education and Skills Development Authority (TESDA). The school also offers degrees in accountancy, early childhood education, hotel and restaurant management, nursing, and psychology.

== Notes and references ==
Notes
