= List of Christian denominations in the Philippines =

The following is a partial list of Christian denominations in the Philippines. Christianity is the country's dominant religion, followed by about 89 percent of the population. The 2020 Census reported that 78.8 percent of the population professed Roman Catholicism; other Christian denominations with a sizable number of adherents include the Iglesia ni Cristo, the Philippine Independent Church, and Seventh-day Adventism.

- Alliance of Bible Christian Communities of the Philippines
- Ambassadors for Christ Philippine Evangelism
- Ang Iglesia Metodista sa Pilipinas
- Apostolic Catholic Church
- Asia Evangelistic Fellowship Philippines
- Assemblies of God
- Association of Baptist Churches in Luzon, Visayas, and Mindanao
- Association of Fundamental Baptist Churches in the Philippines
- Baptist Conference of the Philippines
- Bethany Church of Philippines
- Bible Baptist Church
- Bible Centered Fellowship
- Bread of Life Ministries
- Cathedral of Praise
- Charismatic Full Gospel Ministries
- Christ Faith Fellowship Philippines
- Christ the Living Stone Fellowship
- Christ to the Philippines
- Christian and Missionary Alliance Church of the Philippines
- Christ's Commission Fellowship
- Christian Brethren International Pilipinas
- Christian Missions in the Philippines
- Christian Reformed Church in the Philippines
- Church Body of Christ Filipinista
- Church of Christ
- Church of God World Missions in the Philippines
- Church of Jesus Christ of the Latter Day Saints
- Church of the Foursquare Gospel in the Philippines
- Church of the Nazarene
- Citichurch Cebu
- Conservative Baptist Association in the Philippines
- Convention of the Philippine Baptist Church
- Crusaders of the Divine Church of Christ
- Don Stewart Ministries Miracle Revivals
- Door of Faith
- Episcopal Church in the Philippines
- Evangelical Christian Outreach Foundation
- Evangelical Free Church of the Philippines
- Evangelical Presbyterian Church
- F.R.E.E. Mission Philippines
- Faith Baptist Church
- Faith Tabernacle Church (Living Rock Ministries)
- FIFCOP Mission
- Filipino Assemblies of the First Born
- Filipino Evangelical Methodist Church
- Free Believers in Christ Fellowship
- Free Methodist Church
- Fundamental Grace Gospel Church of the Christ in the Philippines
- General Baptist Churches of the Philippines
- Global Methodist Church Philippines
- God's Sufficient Grace Ministries (Cebu)
- God's Vision Church Of All Nation (Quezon City, Metro Manila, NCR)
- Good News Christian Churches
- Good News Worldwide Mission
- Harvesters Christian Fellowship
- Higher Ground Baptist Mission of the Philippines
- I Am Redeemer and Master Evangelical Church
- Iglesia Evangelica Unida de Cristo
- Iglesia Evangelista Methodista en Las Islas Filipinas (IEMELIF)
- Iglesia ni Cristo
- Iglesia sa Dios Espiritu Santo
- Independent Baptist Churches of the Philippines
- International Baptist Missionary Fellowship
- International One Way Outreach
- Jehovah's Witnesses
- Jesus Christ Saves Global Outreach
- Jesus First Christian Ministries
- Jesus is Alive Community
- Jesus is Lord Church
- Jesus Loves You Ministries
- Jesus Reigns Ministries
- Jesus the Anointed One Church
- Jesus the Blessed Redeemer International Ministry
- Jireh-Evangel Church Planting Philippines
- Kingsway Fellowship International (Philippines)
- Light of the World Christian Center
- Light Church
- Living Word Christian Churches of Cebu International, Inc.
- Lord Jesus Our Redeemer Church Foundation International
- Lord of the Nations
- Love of Christ International Ministries
- Lutheran Church of the Philippines
- March of Faith Church Sole
- Members Church of God International
- Miracle Life Fellowship International
- Miracle Revival Church of the Philippines
- Missionary Baptist Churches of the Philippines
- Most Holy Church of God in Christ Jesus
- National Council of Christian Community Churches (NCCCC)
- Oblates of Mary Immaculate
- Pentecostal Church of God Asia Mission
- Pentecostal Missionary Church of Christ (4th Watch)
- Philippine Benevolent Missionaries Association
- Philippine Brethren Church Incorporated
- Philippine Ecumenical Christian Church
- Philippine Evangelical Holiness Church
- Philippine Evangelical Mission
- Philippine Good News Ministries
- Philippine Independent Catholic Church
- Philippine Missionary Fellowship
- Philippine Pentecostal Holiness Church
- Philippines General Council of the Assemblies of God
- Potter's House Christian Center
- Presbyterian Church in the Philippines
- River of God Church
- Roman Catholic
- Salvation Army Philippines
- Seventh-day Adventist
- Southern Baptist Church
- Take the Nation for Jesus Global Ministries (Corpus Christi)
- Things to Come
- Unida Evangelical Church
- Union Espiritista Cristiana de Filipinas
- Unitarian Universalist Church of the Philippines
- United Church of Christ in the Philippines
- United Evangelical Church of the Philippines (Chinese)
- United Methodists Church
- United Pentecostal Church (Philippines)
- Universal pentecostal Church
- Victory Chapel Christian Fellowship
- Victory Christian Fellowship of the Philippines
- Way of Salvation
- Wesleyan Church
- Word for the World
- Word International Ministries
- World Missionary Evangelism
- Worldwide Church of God
- Zion Christian Community Church
- Verbo of God International Ministry

== Works cited ==
- "TABLE A. Household Population by Religious Affiliation, Region, Province, and Highly Urbanized City: Philippines, 2020". Philippine Statistics Authority. February 22, 2023. Archived from the original on August 12, 2023.
- "Religious Affliation". Philippine Statistics Authority. July 1, 2017. Archived from the original on February 2, 2022.
- "Sect Database". Solemnizing Officers Information System. Philippine Statistics Authority.
