= Protestantism in the Philippines =

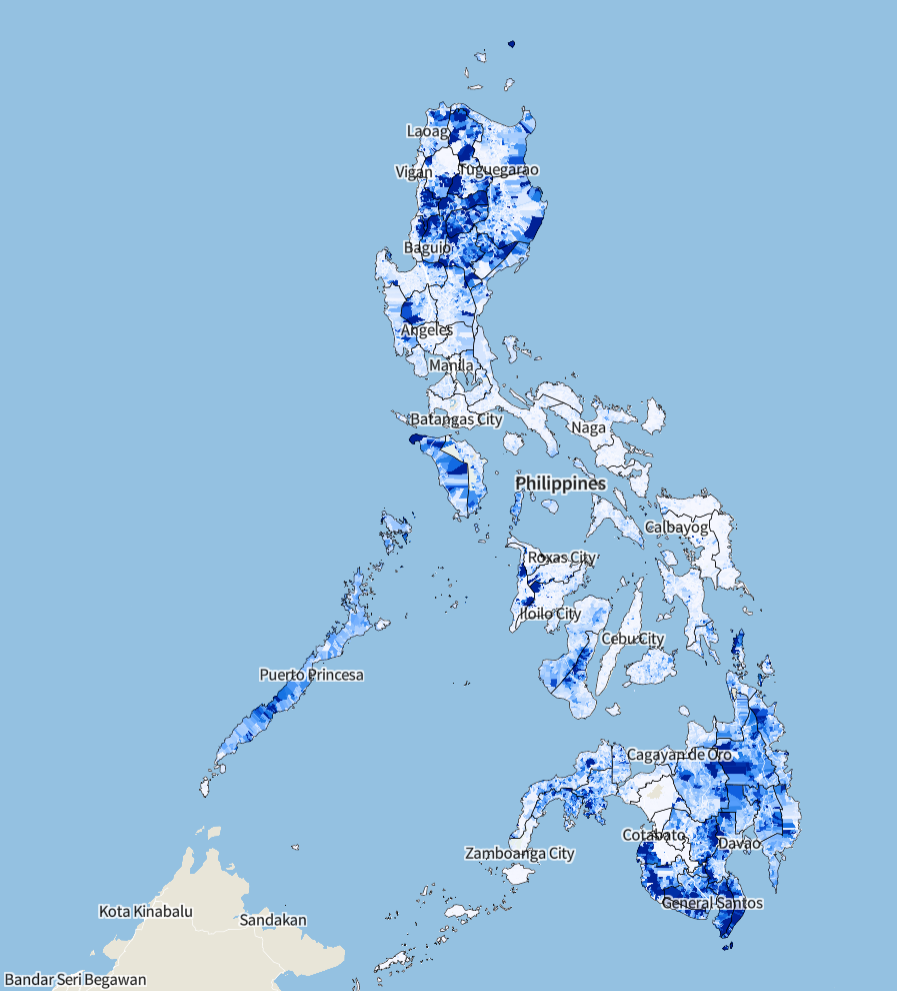
Concentration of Protestants and Evangelicals in the Philippines according to the 2020 Philippine Census per barangay level.

Protestant denominations arrived in the Philippines in 1898, after the United States took control of the Philippines from Spain, first with the United States Army chaplains and then within months civilian missionaries.

Protestants make up nearly 11% of the Filipino population. They include a wide variety of Pentecostal, Evangelical and independent churches. Some denominations were founded locally.

== Statistics ==
Percentage of Protestants in the Philippines by Region
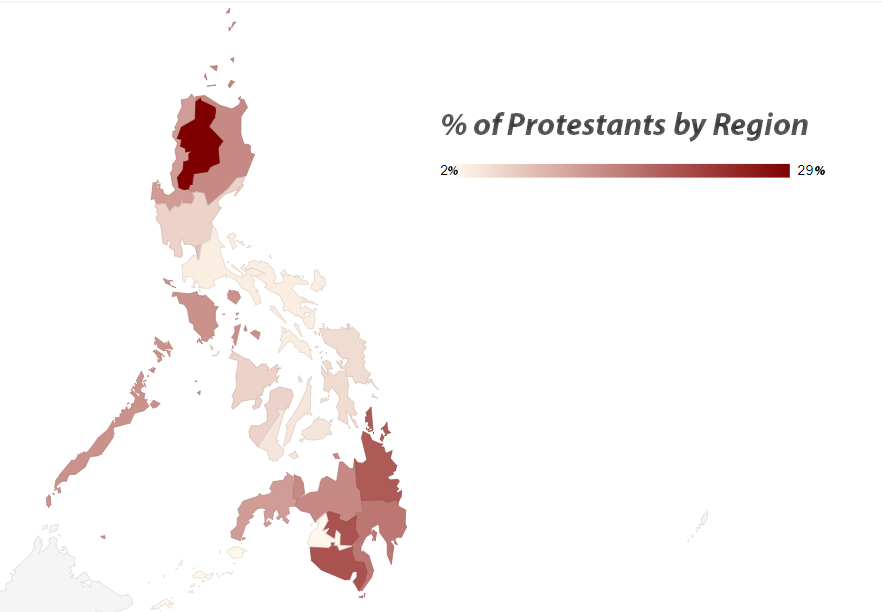

In 2020, the World Christian Database estimated that there are around 38 million Pentecostals and Charismatics along with 19 million Christians independent from denominations in the Philippines.

== History ==
It is likely that there was some Protestant activity in the Philippines before 1898, such as during the British occupation of Manila, but there were no churches or missions established. One alleged early Filipino Protestant was Paulino Zamora, father of Methodist bishop Nicolás Zamora. Some consider Paulino to be the first Protestant in the Philippines. At the time of the Philippine Revolution, Nicolas Zamora was already preaching the gospel, making him one of the earliest Protestant ministers in the Philippines, even before the arrival of American missionaries.

Protestantism began to seriously develop in the Philippines after the Spanish–American War when the United States acquired the Philippines from the Spanish with the 1898 Treaty of Paris. During American colonial period, the Catholic Church was disestablished as the state religion, giving Protestant missionaries more opportunities to enter the islands. In addition, there was a backlash against the Hispanic Catholicism and a greater acceptance of Protestantism represented by the Americans. The dominance of the Catholic Church in all aspects of life in Spanish Philippines and Protestant anti-Catholic animosity were prominent reasons for the start of Protestant missionary activity. In 1901 the Evangelical Union was established in the Philippines to co-ordinate activities amongst the Protestant denominations and lay the foundations for an indigenous religious movement.

The first Protestant service during this era was on Sunday, August 28, 1898. (Note: It was likely that there were Protestant services held in the Philippines during the British occupation of Manila in the 1760s, at least for soldiers like this 1898 service.) Chaplain George Stull, a member of The Methodist Episcopal Church, came with the occupying forces. Although his primary duty was to minister to the soldiers, he recorded in his diary that that first service, held in an old Spanish dungeon facing Manila Bay, was attended not only by his own men but by some Filipinos as well. He commented on this service:

"That the power of God will use this day to make a good Catholic better, any weak American stronger, any backslider ashamed, and the gloomy old dungeon the beginning of wonderful things in these Islands, is my prayer."

=== The Comity Agreement (1898–1941) ===
Jaro Evangelical Church, the first Baptist Church in the Philippines and second Protestant church in the Philippines (first outside Manila), after the Central United Methodist Church

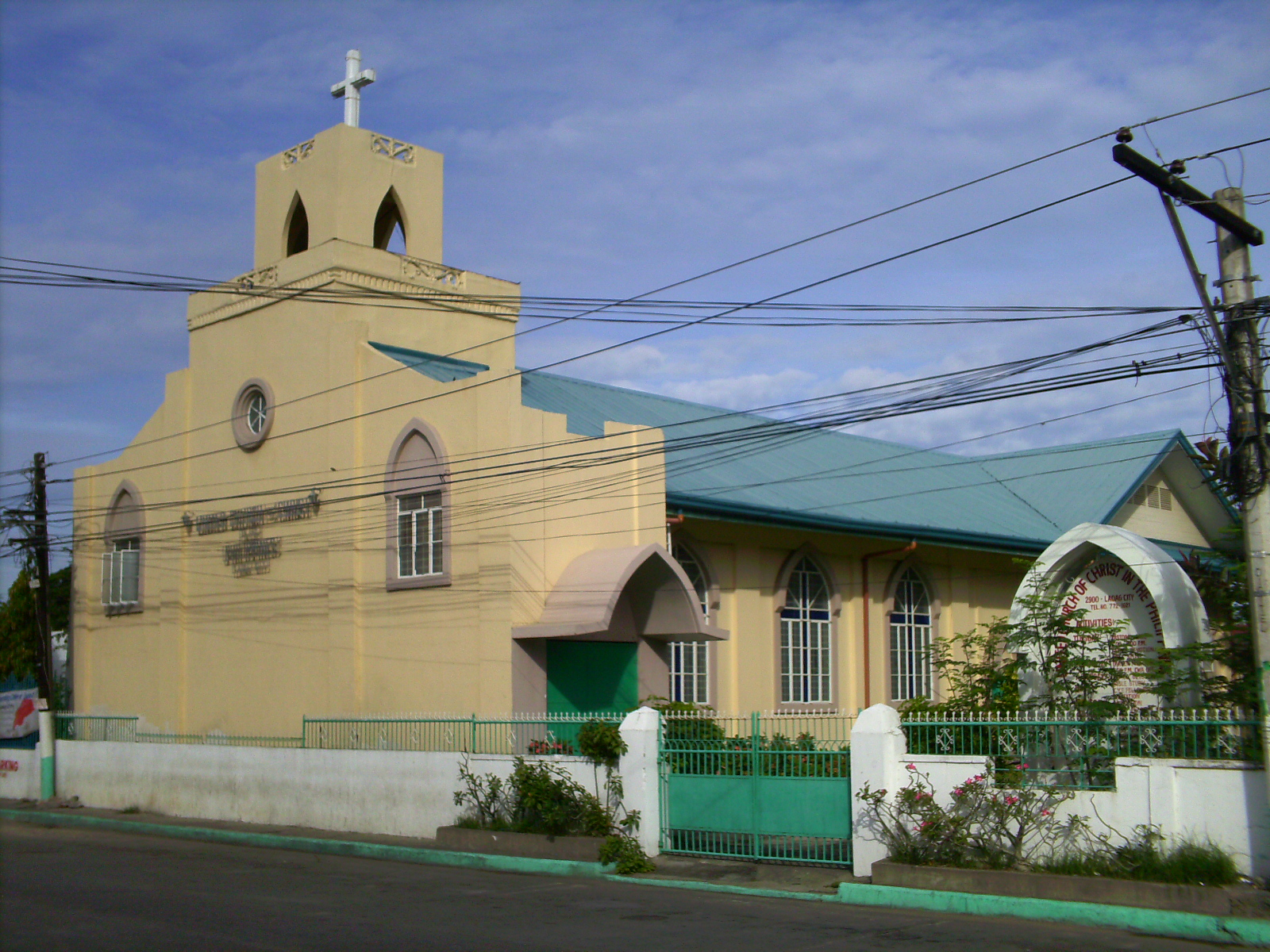
The United Church of Christ in the Philippines in Laoag

After the defeat of the Spanish in the Battle of Manila Bay by the United States Navy's Asiatic Squadron, Presbyterian, Baptist and Methodist leaders met in 1898 in New York to discuss how to bring Protestantism to the Philippines. The result was a comity agreement that divided the Philippines into missionary areas by denomination to avoid future conflicts among themselves and their converts. Only one Protestant denomination would be in each area.

The meeting was followed by another gathering in 1901 by the early missionaries in Manila to further discuss the comity agreement with three specific major agenda items:

- "to organize the Evangelical Union,"
- "choose a common name for Protestant churches," and
- "delineate the geographical work allotments for each church."

From 1898 to 1930 the different Protestant denominations that joined the comity agreement were:

- Methodists (1898) assigned most of lowland Luzon and north of Manila;
- Presbyterians (1899) assigned Bicol, Southern Tagalog area and some parts of Central and Western Visayas;
- Baptists (1900) Western Visayas;
- United Brethren (1901) Mountain Province and La Union;
- Disciples of Christ (1901) Ilocos, Abra, and Tagalog towns;
- Congregationalists (1902), Mindanao except for the western end; and
- Christian and Missionary Alliance (1902), Western Mindanao and Sulu Archipelago.
- Brethren (Kapatirang Kristiano) linked to Plymouth Brethren, was established in the 1930s in San Juan, Metro Manila by a missionary named Cyril H. Brooks. They planted numerous chapels in the Philippines with majority in Bulacan, Pampanga and Rizal Province.

Manila was open to all denominations and mission agencies. The Seventh-day Adventist Church and the Episcopal Church in the Philippines did not join because they wanted to go to all parts of the archipelago. American Protestant Missions (APM) emphasized institutional ministry and medical missions in their evangelistic and missions endeavors.

For a short time the comity agreement worked well, until the situation grew more intricate and splits occurred. The Methodists split in 1909 when Nicolas Zamora founded the Iglesia Evangelica Metodista en las Islas Filipinas (IEMELIF). This shattered the agreement. Thus, the IEMELIF became the first indigenous evangelical denomination, an all-Filipino-supported church at that time, with Methodist Ilocanos from Northern Luzon moved into the areas of the United Church of Christ in the Philippines in Mindanao. Baptist Ilonggos migrated from Iloilo to central Cotabato, traditionally Christian and Missionary Alliance territory. As this kind of movement increased, the sharp boundaries between the different comity areas became obscured.

Divisions came with growth and expansion, and personality clashes, racial tensions, the dynamics of nationalism, cultural differences, power struggles and other non-theological factors contributed to the schisms. In the 1920s the fundamentalist-modernist controversy in the United States affected the Philippines, causing further division. By 1921, some nineteen independent denominations were registered with the Securities and Exchange Commission (SEC) and important splits occurred among the Methodists, Baptists, Presbyterians and Disciples of Christ. Several small denominations, some of them entirely under national leadership, emerged.

Unity of the churches was still a goal. In 1929, the United Brethren, Presbyterian and Congregational Churches formed the United Evangelical Church in the Philippines. In 1932, six of the smaller indigenous denominations of Presbyterian and Methodist backgrounds formed the Iglesia Evangelica Unida de Cristo, or now more commonly known as the Unida Christian Church. The assembly of these indigenous denominations was called by Don Toribio Teodoro, owner of the Ang Tibay shoes. The National Christian Council was founded in 1929 as a successor of the Evangelical Union. This was followed in 1938 by the organization of the Philippine Federation of Evangelical Churches. With the coming of World War II and the Japanese occupation of the Philippines, the United Evangelical Church underwent severe trying circumstances when the mission agencies were completely cut off from the United States. American missionaries were incarcerated and mission funds were unexpectedly discontinued.

=== World War II and independence ===
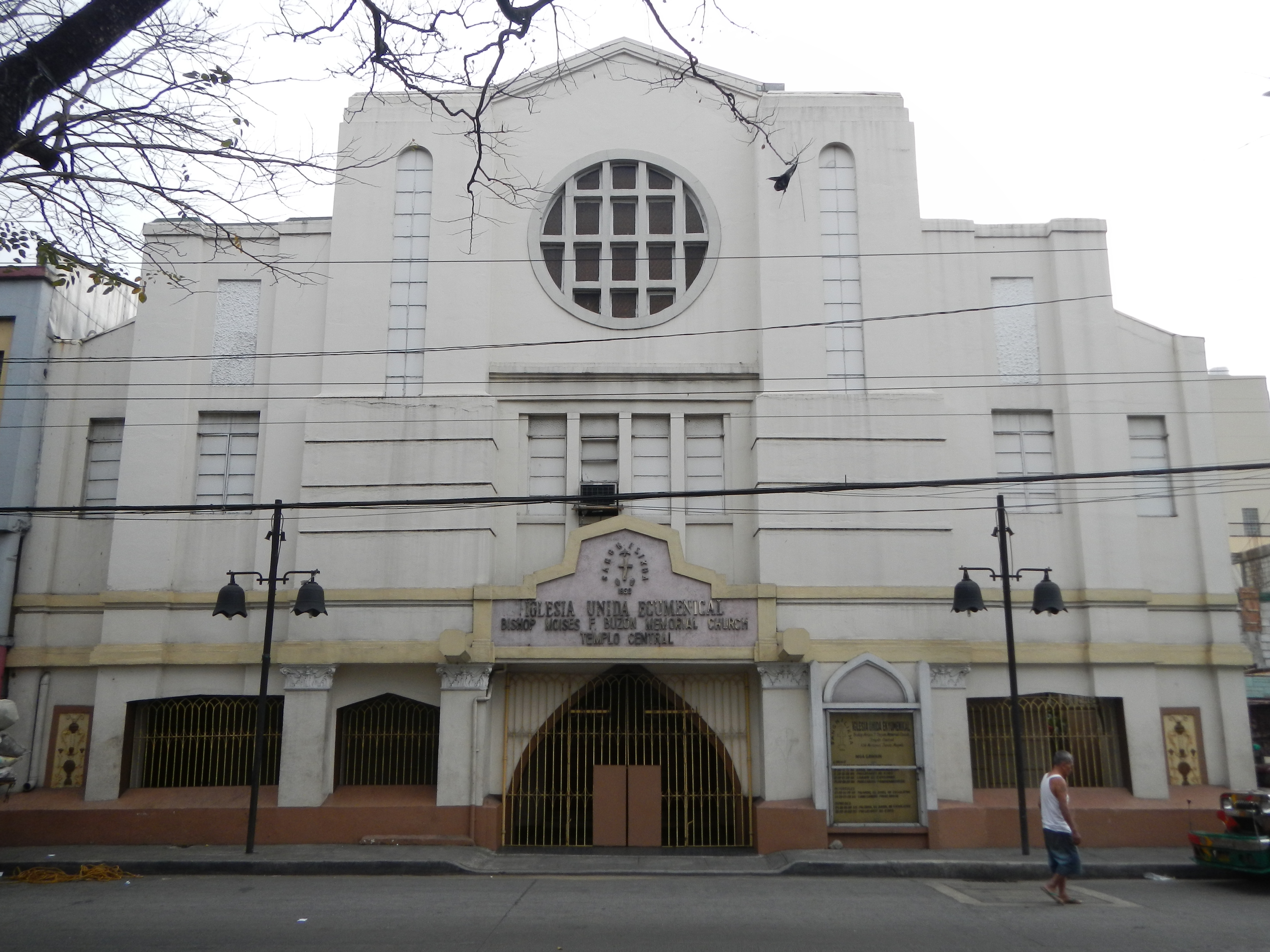
The Bishop Moises F. Buzon Memorial Church - Templo Central of the Iglesia Unida Ekyumenikal (IUE) in Tondo, Manila.

To deal with the diverse Protestant groups, the Japanese during their occupation of the Philippines during Second World War pressed for the formation of the Evangelical Church of the Philippines which combined thirteen denominations. However, most of the larger denominations such as Methodist, Episcopal, Unida and other independent churches refused to join. After the war, the Evangelical Church of the Philippines further fragmented, but the Disciples of Christ, the United Brethren, the Iglesia Evangelica Unida de Cristo, the Evangelica Nacional, some individual congregations of the IEMELIF, the Philippine Methodist and the Presbyterian Churches remained intact. Several churches united to form the United Church of Christ in the Philippines in 1948. In 1949 the United Evangelical Church, the Philippine Federation of Evangelical Churches, and the Iglesia Evangelica Unida de Cristo formed the Philippine Federation of Christian Churches, now called the National Council of Churches in the Philippines. Today, Protestant and evangelical churches and denominations are grouped into major councils of churches: The National Council of Churches in the Philippines (NCCP) for mainline Protestant churches and the Philippine Council of Evangelical Churches (PCEC) for evangelical churches, organized in 1964.

The Every Nation Building in the Philippines completed its first phase in 2003, while the second phase was completed in 2015. It also serves as the central office of Victory Christian Fellowship, one of Every Nation's founding members.

Several independent church organizations emerged in the 1970s and mid-1980s, such as the Jesus Is Lord Church, the Greenhills Christian Fellowship founded in 1978 by the Conservative Baptists, the Bread of Life Ministries International founded in 1982, and the Christ's Commission Fellowship and Victory Christian Fellowship both established in 1984. These churches used mass media to spread evangelical Christianity in the country and to establish more non-denominational, Pentecostal, and charismatic churches. These churches grew up rapidly and are considered one of the major Protestant megachurches in the Philippines.

A major factor in the development of Philippine Protestantism is the explicit expression of religious freedom found in Section 5, Article III ("Bill of Rights) of the 1987 Constitution, separating church and state. The concept and its English phrasing has been present in every national charter since the 1935 Constitution promulgated by the Commonwealth government. The Philippine Youth Movement founded in 1926 boosted the move to develop the indigenous Protestant church nationwide.

A theme in the development of Protestantism in the Philippines is the tension between the religion and nationalism. After an initial period of resentment toward American missionaries, Filipinos gradually accepted Protestantism. During the 1920s and 1930s, American Methodist missionaries openly supported Filipino independence from the United States.

== Education ==
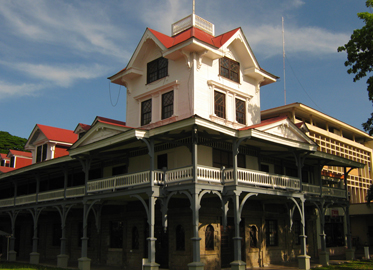
Silliman University was founded by the early Protestant American missionaries in 1901.

Victory Christian Fellowship moved from its initial location in Tandem Cinema to Miramar Theater, also in Manila, in 1986. This congregation shall eventually become Victory U-Belt.

Protestant missionaries founded many schools and universities in the Philippines, some of which having been founded by early American Protestant missionaries. Most notable of these is Silliman University, the first Protestant school in the country and the first university founded by Americans in Asia. Silliman is followed by the Central Philippine University, its sister institution, and other institutions of higher learning such as Trinity University of Asia, West Negros University, Filamer Christian University, the Philippine Christian University, and the Adventist University of the Philippines.

Institution	Founded	Founding affiliation	Founded (Nationality)	Description
Silliman University	1901 as Silliman Bible School	Presbyterian	American	First American and Protestant founded school and university in Asia and in the Philippines
Central Philippine University	1905 as Jaro Industrial School	Baptist	American	First Baptist founded and second American university in Asia and in the Philippines
Filamer Christian University	1904 as Capiz Home School	Baptist	American	
Adventist University of the Philippines	1917 as Philippine Seventh-day Adventist Academy	Seventh-day Adventist Church	Filipino/American	
Philippine Christian University	1946 as Manila Union University	Methodist (United Methodist Church)	American	
Wesleyan University Philippines	1946 as Philippine Wesleyan College	Methodist (United Methodist Church)	Filipino	
West Negros University	1948 as West Negros College	Baptist (now acquired by the STI Education Systems Holdings Inc.)	Filipino	
Trinity University of Asia	1963 as Trinity College of Quezon City	Episcopalian	American	

== List of major denominations and prominent independent churches ==
Name	Orientation	Foundation	Leadership	Headquarters	Membership	References
Assemblies of God	Pentecostal	1940		Malinta, Valenzuela	360,000	
Bread of Life Ministries International	Evangelical	1982	Rev. Noel Tan	Crossroad Center, Paligsahan, Quezon City	35,000	
Cathedral of Praise	Full Gospel	1954	Dr. David E. Sumrall	COP Main Campus, Ermita, Manila		
Christ's Commission Fellowship	Non-denominational	1984	Dr. Peter Fu Tan-Chi	CCF Center, Pasig	243,000	
Christian and Missionary Alliance Churches of the Philippines		1901 (initial formation) 1947 (official)			500,000	
Christian Reformed Church in the Philippines	Calvinist	1962	Rev. Ben Gonzaga		5,000	
Church of the Foursquare Gospel in the Philippines	Pentecostal/Charismatic	1929	Rev. Dr. Delfin L. Corona	#1 F. Castillo Street, Marilag, Project 4, Quezon City 1109	144,000	
Convention of Philippine Baptist Churches	Mainline Baptist	1900 (initial formation) 1935 (formal)	Rev. Danilo Azuela Borlado	Compound Fajardo-Arguelles Sts., Jaro Iloilo City 5000 PHILIPPINES	600,000	
Episcopal Church in the Philippines	Anglican	1901 (under PECUSA) 1990 (autonomy)		Cathedral Heights, Quezon City	125,000	
Evangelical Methodist Church in the Philippine Islands	Methodist	1909	Rev. Noel M. Abiog	Beulah Land IEMELIF Center Marytown Circle, Greenfields 1 Subd., Brgy. Kaligayahan, Quirino Highway, Novaliches, Quezon City, 1124		
Jesus Is Lord Church Worldwide	Full Gospel	1978	Eddie Villanueva	Manila, Philippines	1,000,000	
Lutheran Church in the Philippines	Lutheran	1957	Rev. Antonio del Rio Reyes	Lutheran Center, #4461 Old Santa Mesa Street, Santa Mesa, Manila		
Philippines Central Conference (United Methodist Church)	Methodist				200,540	
Presbyterian Church of the Philippines	Presbyterian	1987	Rev. Danilo Yandan	Pasig	11,000	
Seventh-day Adventist Church	Adventist	1863 (US) 1905 (local)	Election every 5 years in 3 Unions (North, Central, South)	Pasay (Luzon), Cebu City (Visayas), Cagayan de Oro (Mindanao)	> 1.1 million	
The Salvation Army	Holiness Movement	1865 (international) 1937 (local)	Gen. Brian Peddle(International) Col. David Oalang (local)	THQ Malate, Manila		
United Church of Christ in the Philippines	Mainline Methodist/ Calvinist	1901 (early formation) 1948 (official)		4 Oxford St., Cubao, Sr, Quezon City, 1109 Metro Manila	1,500,000	
United Evangelical Church of Christ (Unida Church)	Evangelical	1932	Rev. Richard Buenaventura		25,000	
Victory Christian Fellowship of the Philippines	Evangelical	1984	Manny Carlos	Every Nation Building, Bonifacio Global City, Taguig	295,000	

Some are members of the Association of Pastors for Outreach and Intercession, G12 Philippines, National Council of Churches in the Philippines, Philippine Council of Evangelical Churches, Philippines for Jesus Movement, Christian Conference of Asia, World Methodist Council and the World Council of Churches.

== See also ==
- Religion in the Philippines
- Christianity in the Philippines
