= Mga Awit sa Pagsamba =

1959 Evangelical hymnal

Mga Awit sa Pagsamba (Songs for Worship) is an interdenominational Evangelical Protestant hymnal published by the National Council of Churches in the Philippines. It was first published in December 1959, and has had eight editions by 2007. The hymnal contains hymns translated into Tagalog which are mainly used by the different Evangelical Churches in the Philippines.

The latest revision was headed by Dr. Emilia Reysio-Cruz, one of the leading figures in Philippine folk music.

== Features ==
According to its own Preface, the hymnal contains 300 Pilipino (not Tagalog nor Filipino) songs which are used by the Evangelical Churches in the Philippines in different kinds of services.

One of the main task that needed to be done in the 2007 edition was the thorough revision of some of the popular hymns. When the hymnal was first published in 1959, the Protestant Churches were just budding churches headed mostly by American missionaries. Thus, it could just be expected that their hold of the Philippine languages were not as perfect as the natives. And in case that there were some natives who helped in the translation, the appreciation of Tagalog during that time is not the same at the present. Because of this, some of the popular hymn were reworded to better suit the theology that it teaches.

Another problem of the earlier hymnals was that because they are translations of some of the popular hymns, the translators tried to be as faithful to the words of the original hymn to the expense of putting the wrong stress at the wrong syllable. Also, some of the translations remained ver faithful to the original form that some of the hymns already lost their sense in Tagalog.

The hymnal also tried to avoid the inclusion of songs used for evangelistic meetings and rallies so as to preserve the sacredness of the music that is meant for worship.

== The Working Committee ==
True to its aim of being interdenominational, the working committee included people from the different Evangelical Churches in the Philippines namely:

1. Emilia Reysio-Cruz - Chair of the Committee
2. Teodosia Cruz - Methodist Church
3. Ptr. Simon D. Reyes - Methodist Church
4. Dr. Alejandro, D.D. - Methodist Church
5. Panfila Babista - United Church of Christ in the Philippines
6. Ptr. Andres Garcia - United Church of Christ in the Philippines
7. Noemi Gurrero - Church of Christ (Disciples)
8. Rev. Loreto Saysay - Church of Christ (Disciples)
9. Prt. Vedasto Diolanda - Iglesia Evangelica Metodista en las Islas Filipinas (IEMELIF)
10. Rev. Justiniano Cajiuat - Iglesia Evangelica Unida de Cristo
