= Philippines General Council of the Assemblies of God =

Pentecostal Christian denomination in the Philippines

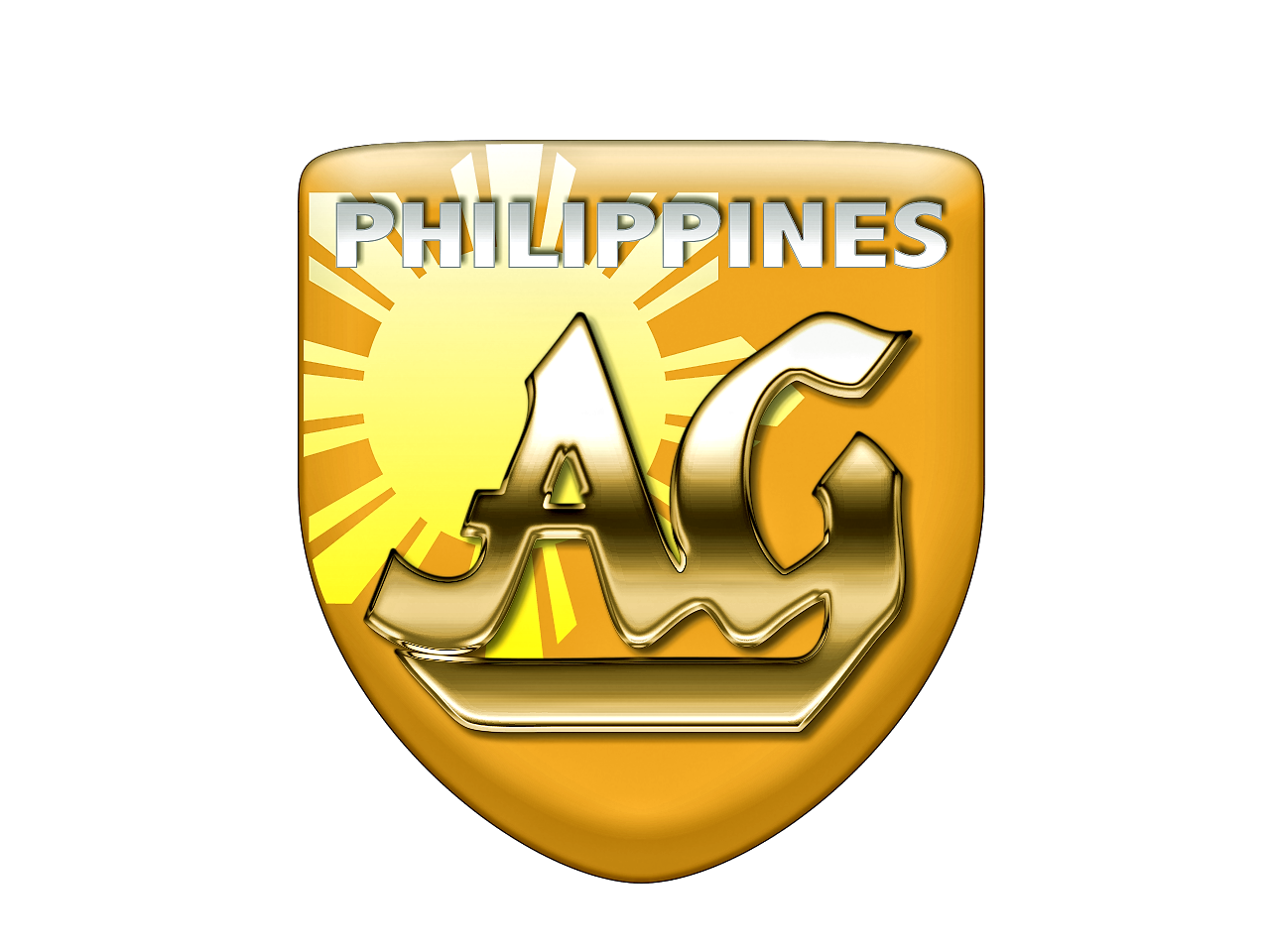
- Abbreviation: PGCAG
- Type: Christianity (Western)
- Classification: Protestant
- Orientation: Evangelical
- Theology: Pentecostal
- General Superintendent: Rev. Reynaldo A. Calusay
- Assistant General Superintendent: Rev. Fidel C. Monzon
- General Secretary: Rev. Alex B. Fuentes
- Associations: World Assemblies of God Fellowship; Philippine Council of Evangelical Churches
- Region: Philippines
- Language: Filipino (lingua franca), Native Philippine regional languages, English
- Headquarters: 1440 Gov. I. Santiago Rd
- Origin: March 1940; 86 years ago Villasis, Pangasinan
- Branched from: Assemblies of God USA
- Congregations: 7,000
- Ministers: 2,400
- Slogan: "All the Gospel"

The Philippines General Council of the Assemblies of God, or PGCAG, is a pentecostal evangelical church denomination based in the Philippines.

== History ==
=== Early beginnings ===
The first missionary of the Assemblies of God in the United States of America to work in the Philippines was Benjamin H. Caudle and his wife, who arrived in 1926. However, Caudle was forced to return to the United States due to his wife's illness.

In the 1930s, Filipinos who had graduated from Assemblies of God Bible schools began requesting for an appointed missionary to be sent to the country and organize the church there. At the time, the Philippines was an American protectorate. Therefore, the AG legally needed a missionary appointed by the U.S. body to be registered as a religious organization.

=== Mission planted ===
In December 1939, the Assemblies of God USA responded by sending a missionary, Leland E. Johnson, to organize and superintend the Philippines District Council of the Assemblies of God. The first convention was held in March 1940 at Villasis, Pangasinan, and the Council was incorporated on June 19 that same year. Other missionaries would arrive, especially from China, as conflict with Japan escalated. In 1941, the Bethel Bible Institute was opened in Baguio to train pastors and evangelists.

=== World War II ===
During World War II, Japanese military forces occupied the Philippines. The Bible institute, like all schools, was closed, and the missionaries were interned. During these years, the district was led entirely by Filipinos.

=== After the war ===
After the war, the missionary presence was revived and the Bethel Bible Institute was reopened. Immanuel Bible Institute in Cebu City was founded in 1951, and in 1953, Bethesda Children's Home was founded by Elva Vanderbout, a missionary to the Igorots of the Mountain Province in Northern Luzon. In 1958, it had 12,022 members.

=== Districts of PGCAG ===
Central Luzon District Council (CLDC)

North Bicol District Council (NBDC)

Northeastern Luzon District Council (NELDC)

Northeastern Ilocandia District Council (NIDC)

Northern Luzon District Council (NLDC)

Palawan District Council (PDC)

South Bicol District Council (SBDC)

South-Central Cordillera District Council (SCCDC)

Tagalog District Council (STDC)

Zambales District Council (ZDC)

Central Visayas Lower District Council (CVLLDC)

Eastern Visayas District Council (EVDC)

Negros Occidental District Council (NODC)

Northwestern Visayas District Council (NWVDC)

Western Visayas District Council (WVDC)

North Central Mindanao District Council (NCMDC)

Northeastern Mindanao District Council (NEMDC)

Northwestern Mindanao District Council (NWMDC)

Southeastern Mindanao District Council (SEMDC)

Southern Mindanao District Council (SMDC)

Southwestern Mindanao District Council (SWMDC)
