= Presbyterian Church of the Philippines =

Philippine church

- Type: Christianity (Western)
- Classification: Protestant
- Orientation: Calvinist
- Theology: Reformed
- Polity: Presbyterian
- Moderator: Rev. Lemuel Dalisay
- Vice Moderator: Rev. Manuel Maca
- Associations: World Reformed Fellowship; Philippine Council of Evangelical Churches; Council of Presbyterian Churches in the Philippines
- Headquarters: 42 F. Banaag St., Barangay Pineda, Pasig City 1600
- Origin: 1985; Quezon City, Philippines
- Branched from: Presbyterian Church in Korea (HongDu); Presbyterian Church in Korea (TongHap); Presbyterian Church in Korea (Koshin); Mission to the World – (Presbyterian Church in America)
- Separations: Reformed Presbyterian Church of the Philippines (1979)
- Congregations: 300
- Members: 20,818 (2020)
- Seminaries: Presbyterian Theological Seminary
- Official website: www.pcpga.org

The Presbyterian Church of the Philippines (PCP), officially The General Assembly of the Presbyterian Church of the Philippines, is a growing evangelical, Bible-based Reformed church in the Philippines. It was officially founded in 1986 and the General Assembly was organized in September 1996.

== Origin ==
=== United Church of Christ in the Philippines ===
A previous Presbyterian church denomination was founded in 1899 by American missionaries led by Rev. James Burton Rodgers.

In 1901, the earlier American missionary-founded Presbyterian group entered into a comity agreement with other denominations founded by American missionaries — the Methodist Episcopal Church, Northern Baptists, the United Brethren Church, the Christian and Missionary Alliance, the Disciples of Christ, and several Congregational churches. They agreed to "delineate the geographical work allotments for each church" and use the common name "Evangelical Church".

However, the comity agreement would eventually collapse. There were subsequent attempts to replace it, but none was created and prospered out of it. In 1932, some Presbyterian congregations even broke away to form the United Evangelical Church of Christ (Iglesia Evangelica Unida de Cristo), which is still in existence.

Finally in 1948, the Presbyterian denomination merged with other Protestant denominations to form the United Church of Christ in the Philippines.

=== New Presbyterian denomination ===
The Presbyterian Church of the Philippines was founded by missionaries sent by the Presbyterian Church in Korea (HapDong). A new Presbyterian movement was inspired by the Reverend Choi Chang-Young, who worked in the Philippines with the Bible Society between 1974 and 1977. He was sent by the Presbyterian Church in Korea (TongHap) In 1977, Rev. Kim Hwal-Young was sent to the Philippines from Vietnam by the Foreign Mission Board of Presbyterian Church of Korea (Hapdong). However, he was unable to establish constructive relationship with the United Church of Christ in the Philippines. Thus, they founded the Evangelical Presbyterian Mission to restore Presbyterian Church, and was registered with the Philippine government. By this time, there were 266 Korean missionaries in the country.

More Korean missionaries joined the work. They agreed to establish a new Presbyterian denomination in 1981. The Evangelical Presbyterian Mission founded 4 local congregations by 1983. However, as the number of Korean missionaries increased, the tension among them also grew, along with conflict between the missionaries and the local Filipino church. This led to the first split from the Presbyterian Church in 1989. The formation of a breakaway congregation known as Reformed Presbyterian Church of the Philippines was led by Rev. Yooshik (Joseph) Kim, who has been a missionary sent by the Presbyterian Church in Korea (HapDong) in Manila in 1979. The Evangelical Presbyterian Mission established the Presbyterian School of Theology in 1983 (later changed to Presbyterian Theological Seminary) to train future leaders of the new Presbyterian movement.

The Reverend Theodore and Grace Hard, longtime missionaries of the Orthodox Presbyterian Church in the United States who were formerly stationed in Pusan in South Korea since 1954, joined in the educational work of the new theological institution as professors and library consultants. In 1986, an agreement was reached by the leaders of Evangelical Presbyterian Mission (Hapdong), Reformed Church of the Philippines (TongHap), Presbyterian Mission in the Philippines (Koshin) and HapdongBosu Mission declaring their unity and cooperation to establish a single Presbyterian denomination in the Philippines. Later, Mission to the World of the Presbyterian Church in America joined the cooperative effort. The Reverend Lemuel Dalisay was the first Filipino to be ordained as minister. The first Presbytery was created on June 27, 1987. On September 16, 1996, the first General Assembly was held at Los Baños Presbyterian Church in Los Baños, Laguna. The Presbyterian Church of the Philippines was then organized into four presbyteries.

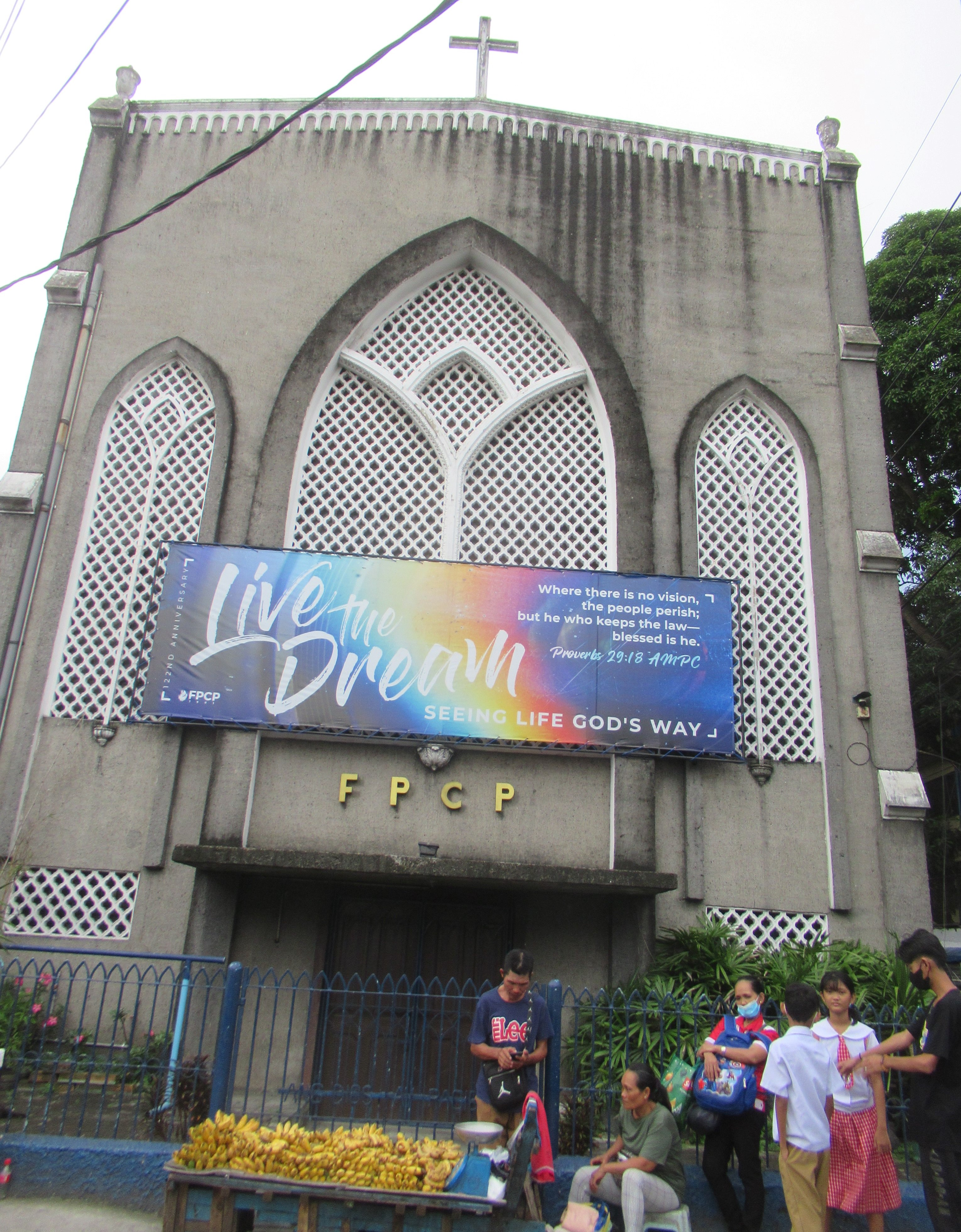
The First Presbyterian Church of Pasig, founded in 1901.

The General Assembly of the Presbyterian Church is the highest governing body and judicatory of this denomination. The General assembly meets annually during the third full week of October since 1996. In 2002, the Presbyterian Church of the Philippines participated in a series of dialogues with other Presbyterian denominations and groups in the Philippines that included Reformed Presbyterian Church of the Philippines, Daeshin Presbyterian Church in the Philippines and some independent Presbyterian groups. The dialogue resulted to the creation of an ecumenical body, the Council of Presbyterian Churches in the Philippines (CPCP) in 2003. The leadership of the council was distributed among member denominations with the Reverend Rei Eusebio, who was the General Secretary of the Presbyterian Church of the Philippines at the time, as the founding chairman.

In the early 2000s the denomination had about 150 congregations and more than 5,000 members. The worship is in English, Filipino and local dialects.

=== PCP RINGS 2020 ===
On June 11, 2013, a special General Assembly was held to approve and launch the new 7-year vision of the denomination "PCP RINGS 2020". It is an acronym for "Relational, Indigenous, Numerical, Global and Social growth", a thrust of PCP for the next seven years. It also recommended the establishment of a mission program called "Diaspora ministry" which aims to rally the support and cooperation of many PCP members in other countries and establish PCP congregations in those countries.

== Doctrine ==
=== Confessions ===
The denomination adopts the following as its official doctrinal standard :

- Westminster Confession of Faith
- Westminster Shorter Catechism
- Westminster Larger Catechism,

=== Solas of the Reformation ===
The Presbyterian Church in the Philippines teaches the Solas of the Reformation.

- Sola Scriptura - Scripture Alone
- Sola Gratia - Grace Alone
- Sola Fide - Faith Alone
- Solus Christus - Christ Alone
- Soli Deo Gloria - Glory to God Alone

=== Office bearers ===
The Presbyterian Church of the Philippines adheres to the principle of plurality of leadership/ There are two classes of officers in the Presbyterian Church of the Philippines

- Elders
  - teaching elders, also called Ministers of the Word, are ordained by the Presbytery after satisfying lengthy ordination process and requirements that include a strong sense of calling, an educational degree in theology, ordination trials that include oral and written assessment of biblical and doctrinal conviction, readiness and background check. They are installed in the congregation that called them. Presbyterian Church of the Philippines does not set a term limit for Teaching Elders to serve in a local church.
  - ruling elders are members of a local congregation that are elected and ordained by church Session to serve for a definite term.

Both the teaching elders and ruling elders govern a local church and have equal authority in governance. The teaching elder is always the Moderator of the Session. Every congregation is represented by an equal number of teaching and ruling elders to the Presbytery and General Assembly. A church is classified organized only when there is a teaching elder and at least two ruling elders. Unorganized churches are under the direct care of the Presbytery.

- Deacons

The deacons are members of the local congregation that are elected and ordained to take charge of temporal affairs of the church.

== Statistics ==
The denomination consists of about 300 churches and 10 regional presbyteries.

Presbytery		Moderator
1.	Northern Luzon	Rev.
2.	Central Luzon North	Rev. Jose Pineda, Jr.
3.	Central Luzon	Rev.
4.	National Capital Region Presbytery ― North Metro	Rev. Roberto Fabia
5.	National Capital Region Presbytery ― South Metro	Rev. Edgar Adra
6.	Southern Luzon	Rev.
7.	Visayas	Rev. Manuel Maca
8.	Western Visayas	
9.	Mindanao	Rev. Valeriano Geloca
10.	Cavite	Rev. Francis Bañaga

The headquarters of the church is located in Metro Manila. The Presbyterian Church of the Philippines is the largest Presbyterian denomination in the country.

According to the 2020 Philippine Census, 20,818 reported being affiliated with the denomination.

== Seminary and theological education ==
The Presbyterian Theological Seminary was established primarily to train future leaders of the Presbyterian Church of the Philippines. The seminary was previously called Presbyterian School of Theology. The seminary opened its doors to leaders of other denominations and other nations. The seminary trains Filipino ministerial candidates as well as foreign students from Myanmar, Kenya, Nigeria, Korea, Bangladesh, Kenya, Gambia, Palestine and Vietnam.

=== History of the seminary ===
The School of Theology was started in 1983 with ten students. The original name Presbyterian School of Theology, was changed to Presbyterian Theological Seminary (PTS) in 1985. It is located in Dasmariñas, Cavite since 1987. PTS is the official ministerial training school of the Presbyterian Church of the Philippines. While there are regional bible seminaries operated under the denomination, its graduates are required by the church to take additional courses at PTS. This policy has been contested in the General Assembly. To date, every motion to change the policy is defeated by majority votes.

==== Name changes ====
- 1983 Presbyterian School of Theology
- 1985 Presbyterian Theological Seminary
- 2010 PTS College and Advanced Studies

== International organizations ==
Member of the World Reformed Fellowship and the Philippine Council of Evangelical Churches.

== Practices ==
=== Theology and worship ===
The Presbyterian Church of the Philippines is a confessional church. It is conservative in theology and evangelical in mission. It maintains a high view of the Bible as the infallible, inerrant, and inspired word of God in every part and its entirety. Pastors diligently teach the Reformed faith to new adherents. New members are initiated through membership classes with emphasis on Calvinist doctrines. Biblical teaching and preaching characterizes its pastoral ministry. Hymns and contemporary gospel music are also used during worship.

=== Organization ===
Leaders are carefully selected based on spiritual maturity and giftedness instead of popularity and social status. Many churches still do not have ordained elders and deacons. However, churches that do not have ruling elders are under the care of the Presbytery through a minister who has been assigned as interim Moderator. More than half of all churches do not have elders. It is required for ministers to obtain a degree in theology as a requirement for ordination.

It practices church discipline. It does not allow ordination of women as a matter of church policy, though some churches have Bible-women who are basically female pastors. Only ordained Ministers are authorized to administer baptism and the Lord's Supper or communion.

=== Baptism ===
Normally, baptism by sprinkling or pouring is administered to infants of believing parents. In some cases, baptism by dipping or immersion is done. A profession of faith in Christ is required for new members. It receives new members without requiring rebaptism those who previously received trinitarian baptism in other churches, including the Catholic Church. Communion is open to any baptized adults and older children who were confirmed by the Minister through a profession of faith but excludes individuals who are under church censure.

== Challenges ==
Despite the phenomenal growth of this denomination, the PCP had a relatively long list of weaknesses. Among the challenges the denomination faces is the lack of connection to other Presbyterian bodies outside the Philippines. Ministers who migrated to other countries are not readily absorbed by local Reformed and Presbyterian bodies due to the absence of the PCP's mutual connections with those denominations, notwithstanding their theological affinity.

This situation forces migrant ministers to join other denominations, instead, like Baptists, Pentecostals, Methodists, etc., which are more open and accommodating. Those who opted to join Presbyterian denominations in the United States were required to go through their ordination process. To date, the sending denominations of the missionaries in the Philippines have not affirmed the Presbyterian Church of the Philippines as their coequal and fraternal church, but only as a mission field. The PCP's affiliation with the World Reformed Fellowship (WRF), which is a fellowship and not a council, is based on agreement on Reformed orthodoxy and partnership.

Native leaders complain about the paternalistic attitude of many foreign missionaries, who are continually trying to control the denomination and churches. Foreign mission groups have difficulty working together for a common cause. The lack of cooperation between mission bodies also threaten the unity of the Filipino church leaders, especially those who are loyal to their respective "patron-missionaries".

Tension among missionaries are also evident. Some missionaries duplicate the errors of the many Western missionaries in the early years of Protestant Christianity in the Philippines, such as spirit of superiority and lack of trust on the local leaders' financial management ability. The proliferation of theological institutions within the denomination attest to its lack of control over the mission agencies that operate them.

== Stance on social issues ==
The Presbyterian Church of the Philippines, unlike other Presbyterian and Reformed denominations — such as the United Church of Christ in the Philippines, the Iglesia Evangelica Unida de Cristo, and the Christian Reformed Church — does not have official stand on socio-political issues. However, individual members can freely express their personal views on such issues.

== See also ==
- Christianity in the Philippines
  - Protestantism in the Philippines
