= National Council of Churches in the Philippines =

Christian ecumenical group

- Abbreviation: NCCP
- Formation: 1963
- Location: Philippines
- Website: nccphilippines.org

The National Council of Churches in the Philippines (NCCP; Tagalog: Sangguniáng Pambansâ ng mga Simbahan sa Pilipinas) is a fellowship of ten Protestant and non-Catholic Christian churches and denominations, as well as ten service-oriented organizations in the Philippines. A member of the World Council of Churches and the Christian Conference of Asia, the NCCP represents close to 3 million Protestant adherents (Note: A total of 2,953,697 to be precise.) in the Philippines who according to the 2020 Philippine census, comprise the fourth (4th) largest religious affiliation in the country. (Note: Member churches of the Philippine Council of Evangelical Churches (PCEC) have a total of 2,469,957 members according to the 2010 Philippine census, making Evangelical Christianity as the third largest denomination in the Philippines. Evangelical population is also larger than that of the Iglesia ni Cristo or INC (which reportedly had 2,251,941 adherents in 2010). However, the total count was not reflected as member churches were treated separately in the 2020 Philippine census. The total number of adherents for Evangelical and PCEC member churches listed in the 2020 Philippine census would be 4,997,669 or 4.6 percent of the Filipino population. Adherents of member churches of the National Council of Churches in the Philippines (NCCP), meanwhile, total to 2,953,697 for the 2020 Philippine census, or 2.7 percent. This makes the NCCP as the fourth largest denomination in the Philippines after the Evangelicals, and the INC as the fifth largest.) Advocacy for environmental protection and against large-scale mining are part of its core mission. Christian organizations other than churches may be received as associate members.

== History and structure ==
The NCCP was established in 1963. Its forerunners include the Philippine Federation of Christian Churches in 1949; the Philippine Federation of Evangelical Churches in 1939; the National Christian Council in 1929; the Evangelical Union in 1901; and the Missionary Alliance in 1900.

It is currently organised in ten regional ecumenical councils:

- Cordillera
- Cagayan Valley
- Pangasinan-Ilocos-La Union-Abra
- Romblon-Mindoro
- Palawan
- Western Visayas
- Eastern Visayas
- Cotabato
- Misamis Oriental-Camiguin-Butuan-Lanao
- Basilan-Zamboanga-Misamis Occidental Regional Ecumenical Council

The NCCP headquarters is located at 879 Epifanio de los Santos Avenue, Barangay West Triangle, Quezon City, Metro Manila. Its General Secretary is Bishop Reuel Norman O. Marigza of the United Church of Christ in the Philippines.

== Member churches ==
Some of member denominations and service-oriented organizations are:

Member church	Theological orientation
Apostolic Catholic Church (ACC)	Independent Catholic
Convention of Philippine Baptist Churches (CPBC)	Baptist
Episcopal Church in the Philippines (ECP)	Anglican
Iglesia Evangelica Metodista en las Islas Filipinas (IEMELIF) (Evangelical Methodist Church in the Philippine Islands)	Methodist
Iglesia Filipina Independiente (IFI) (Philippine Independent Church)	Independent Catholic, Anglo-Catholic
Iglesia Unida Ekyumenikal (IUE) (United Ecumenical Church)	United Church
Lutheran Church in the Philippines (LCP)	Lutheran
The Salvation Army Philippine Territory (TSA)	Holiness movement
United Church of Christ in the Philippines (UCCP)	United Church
The Philippines Central Conference of the United Methodist Church (UMC)	Methodist

=== Associate members ===
- Association of Christian Schools, Colleges and Universities (ACSCU)
- Consortium of Christian Organizations for Rurban Development (CONCORD)
- Ecumenical Church Loan Foundation, Inc. (ECLOF)
- Kaisahang Buhay Foundation (KBF)
- Lingap Pangkabataan, Inc. (LPI)
- Manila Community Service, Inc. (MCSI)
- Philippine Bible Society (PBS)
- Student Christian Movement of the Philippines (SCMP)
- Union Church of Manila (UCM)

== Radio stations ==
NCCP owns a few stations across the country.

Branding	Callsign	Frequency	Power (kW)	Location	Notes
Radyo Sagada	DWSW	104.7 MHz	1 kW	Sagada	Operated by Kodao Productions.
SR95	DYSR	95.1 MHz	5 kW	Dumaguete	Affiliated with Quest Broadcasting.

== See also ==
- Philippine Council of Evangelical Churches
- Christianity in the Philippines
  - Catholic Church in the Philippines
  - Philippine Orthodox Church
  - Protestantism in the Philippines
- Buddhism in the Philippines
- Hinduism in the Philippines
- Islam in the Philippines
- Mga Awit sa Pagsamba
