= BOLM =

Bolm or BOLM may refer to

- Adolph Rudolphovitch Bolm, dancer and choreographer
- Hermann-Ernst Bolm, member of the Wehrmacht during World War II
- Kirsten Bolm, German hurdler
- BOLM (also BOLMI), Bread of Life Ministries International
