= Christ's Commission Fellowship =

Evangelical Christian multi-site church

Coordinates: 14°35′21″N 121°04′45″E

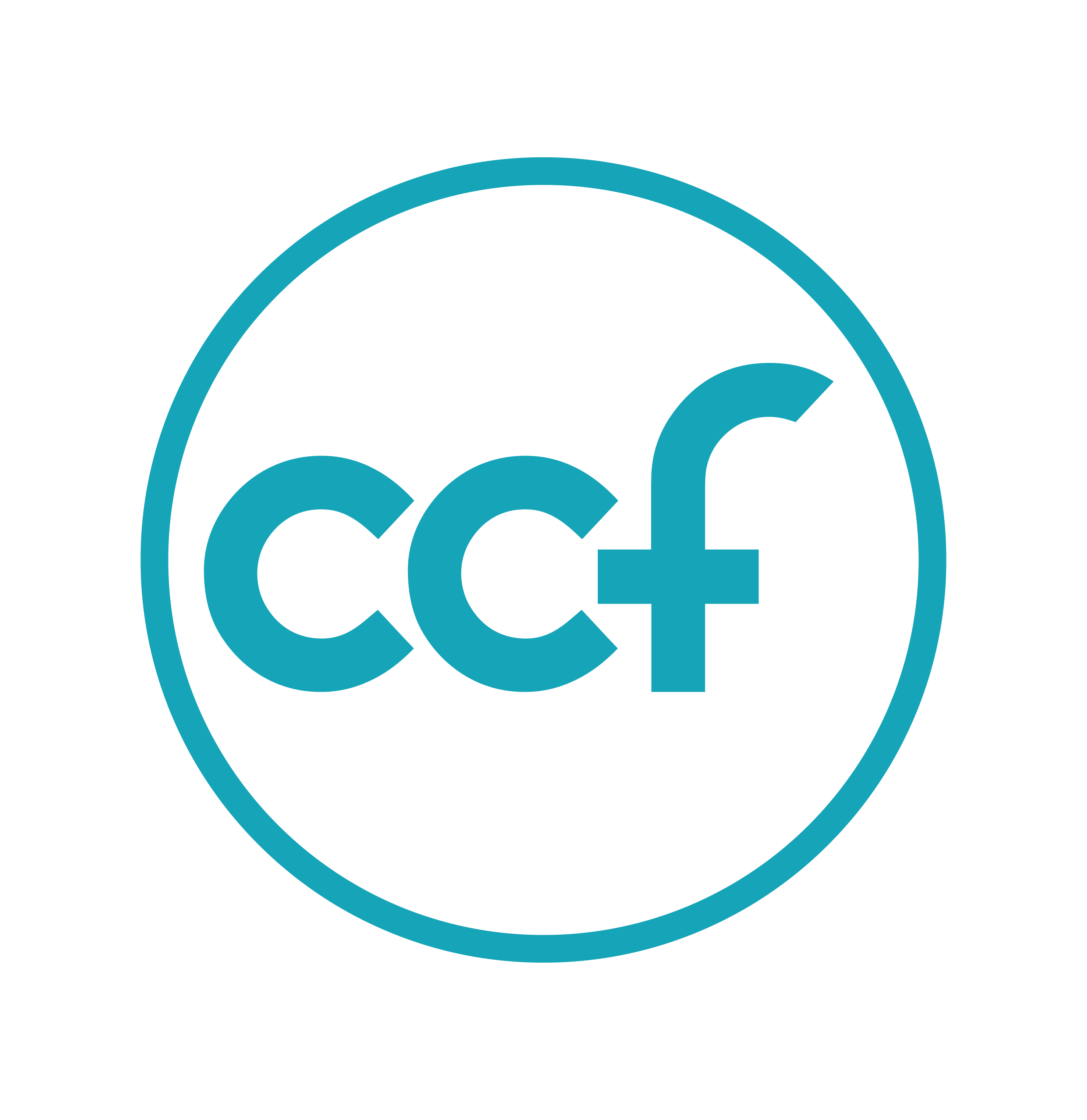
- Abbreviation: CCF
- Classification: Non-denominational Christianity
- Theology: Trinitarianism; Biblical inerrancy Salvation by faith Baptism with the Holy Spirit (Note: The church believes that the Holy Spirit is God and possesses all the Divine attributes. He indwells all believers, baptizes and seals all believers at the moment they trust in Jesus Christ to be their only Savior and Lord.)
- Senior Pastor: Peter Tan-Chi
- Executive Pastor: Ricky Sarthou
- Headquarters: CCF Center, Ortigas Avenue corner C5 Road, Ortigas East, Pasig, Metro Manila, Philippines
- Origin: August 1984; 42 years ago (first worship service); March 6, 1985; 41 years ago (registration with the Securities and Exchange Commission) (Note: Registered as Christ's Commission Foundation, operating under the name of Christ's Commission Fellowship. The date of its first worship service in August 1984 is commemorated by the church as its anniversary date, not the registration date.)
- Members: 192,000 (as of 2024); 243,000 (as of 2025)
- Places of worship: 141 satellites worldwide (85 in the Philippines), 233 house churches (as of 2025)
- Missionary organization: International Church Planting (ICP), CCF Beyond
- Aid organization: Christ's Commission Foundation Ministries, Inc. (CCFMI)
- Tertiary institutions: Life Academy International (LAI)
- Official website: www.ccf.org.ph
- Slogan: To honor God and make Christ-committed followers who will make Christ-committed followers

Christ's Commission Fellowship (CCF) is an international non-denominational megachurch founded by Peter Tan-Chi, based in the Philippines. CCF currently has 85 satellite churches in the Philippines, while its main church is located at the CCF Center in Ortigas East (formerly Frontera Verde), Pasig. CCF is part of the Board of Trustees of the Philippine Council of Evangelical Churches. It is ranked as one of the largest megachurches in the Philippines, and in Asia. During its 2026 Intentional Discipleship Conference, CCF announced the church goal of having 5 million members by 2030. Between February 25 and October 27, 2026, CCF has reached more than 100,000 people under this campaign.

== History ==
The CCF Center in Pasig. As of 2025, weekly attendance in CCF Main exceeded 190,000.

=== Beginnings as Bible study groups ===
In 1982, Chinese Filipino businessman and Axeia Group of Companies founder Peter Tan-Chi began evangelistic home Bible studies in Antipolo and Cainta, Rizal. During those Bible studies, only three couples were in attendance, but word of mouth helped the Bible studies grow in participation. Two years later, a core group of 40 people consisting of businessmen, professionals, and their families emerged from these Bible studies. In August 1984, Christ's Commission Fellowship held its first worship service at the Asian Institute of Management (AIM) in Makati with 400 people in attendance. Wednesday Bible studies were also conducted at AIM. CCF's continuous growth has led its worship services to several relocations. From AIM, CCF changed venues to Greenbelt in Makati (1986), then to the Philippine International Convention Center Plenary Hall in Pasay (1991). (Note: Pastor Peter Tan-Chi finished his bachelor's degree at the University of the Philippines, and master's degree at AIM.)

=== Early expansion ===
Between 1991 and 1994, CCF posted continued growth, and eventually established its first satellite church at Sucat, Parañaque eventually relocated to Alabang, Muntinlupa in 2003, this would later become CCF Alabang. In 1997, CCF's worship services transferred to St. Francis Square in Ortigas Center, Mandaluyong, where it was established as its main worship center until the completion of the CCF Center in April 2013.

In the intervening period between 1997 and 2013, CCF satellite churches began to be planted outside Metro Manila. Mindanao saw its first church plants with CCF CDO and CCF Malaybalay in 1998. CCF also entered the Visayas provinces with the opening of CCF Cebu in 2000. In the provinces near Metro Manila, CCF Malolos in 2003 and CCF Taytay in 2004 were among the first to be established.

=== CCF Center and International Church Planting ===
In 2006, CCF Singapore held its first worship service, marking the first overseas church plant of CCF. During the same year, CCF Beyond was established as a response to the call for international expansion. Since its inception, CCF Beyond has helped create over 45,000 satellites and house churches in more than 40 nations worldwide. In creative access nations, CCF maintains an additional 35,000 to 40,000 small groups.

In 2008, CCF broke ground for what would be the site of their new main building. On May 12, 2013, CCF held its first Sunday worship service at the new CCF Center in Frontera Verde (now Ortigas East) in Pasig. It housed the church's offices and school, a youth and sports center, a 10,000-seat chapel, and a 2,000-seat overflow hall. The CCF Center was also the venue for the Manila leg of evangelist Nick Vujicic's "Unstoppable" tour that same month on May 18, 2013. In the same year, CCF had 38 satellites in the Philippines and eight abroad, with 46 congregations consisting of 40,000 members.

In 2009, CCF began live streaming services. As of 2025, it has reportedly reached more than 18 million people in 183 nations globally.

The 2015 Philippine census placed the number of CCF's adherents at 75,000. Meanwhile, other academic estimates show a range from 100,000 members (2022) to 110,000 members (2023) in more recent years.

In 2016, the church was chosen by the Dangerous Drugs Board to offer a spiritual rehabilitation program for drug addicts as part of the Philippine drug war of the Duterte administration. Also in the same year, the first MOVE Youth Discipleship Conference (now MOVE Campus Conference) was held from 2–4 June.

In 2017, CCF held its first Intentional Discipleship Conference (IDC).

In 2021, CCF Academy Foundation (now known as Life Academy International) was recognized as an international school with special privileges under Philippine law through the passage of Republic Act No. 11638.

== Media and events ==
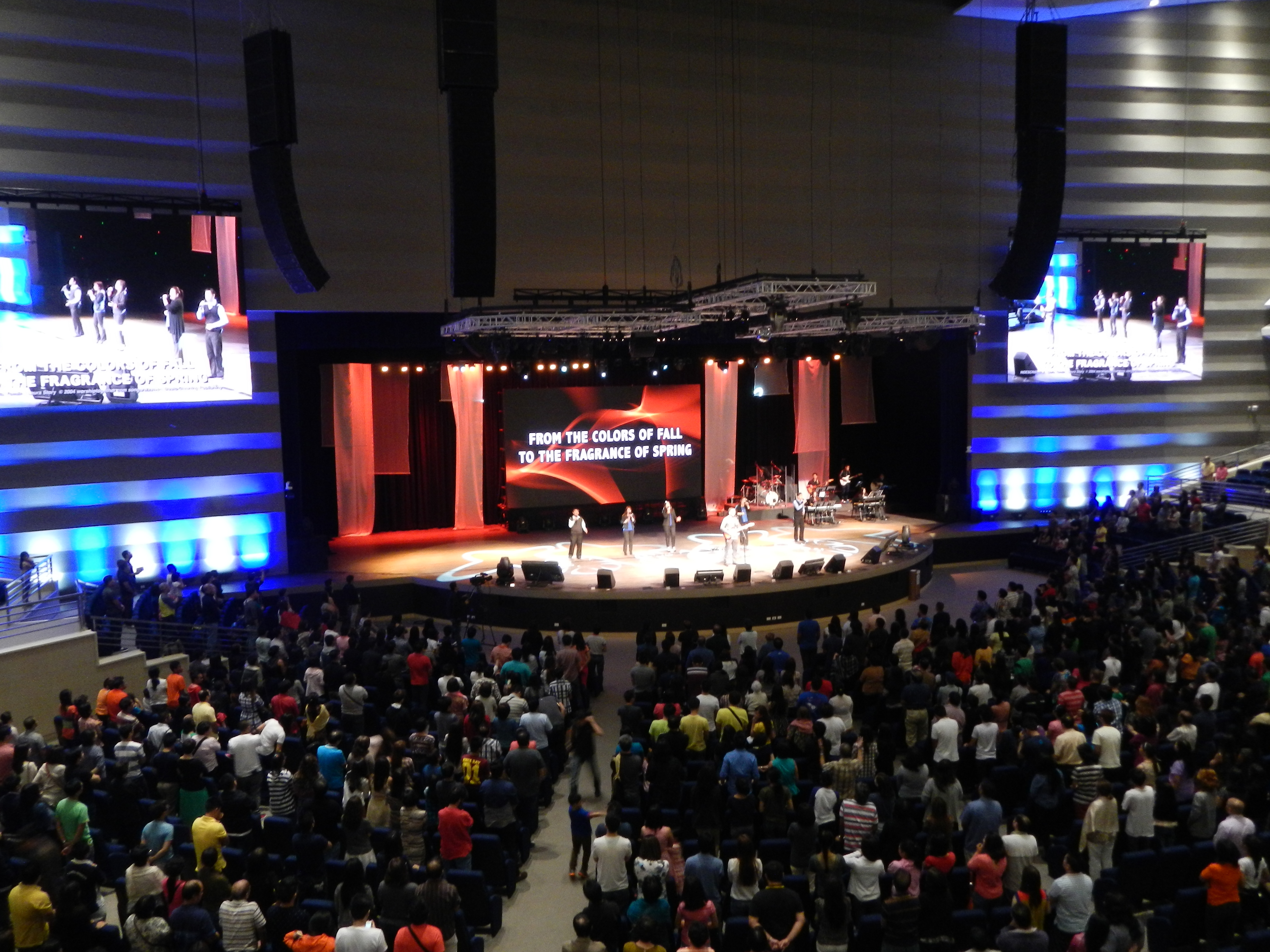
Praise and Worship Service at CCF Center's Main Auditorium.

=== Music ===
==== Exalt Worship ====
Exalt Worship, formerly CCF Exalt, is the contemporary worship music band of CCF. As of 2026, the band has released three albums: Majestic (2019), One God (2024), and God Is (2026); and multiple singles, four of which were released in 2023.

==== Elevate Exalt ====
The church's youth band, Elevate Exalt, released its first single in 2022 entitled, Reliably True, which is the namesake for its first extended play featuring songs such as "All Glorious" and "Land of the Living" - also released in the same year.

=== Conferences and Events ===
==== Intentional Discipleship Conference ====
The Intentional Discipleship Conference (IDC) is a three-day annual conference the church holds each year. First started in 2017, it is hosted by CCF and involves multiple international speakers.

==== MOVE Campus Conference ====
The MOVE Campus Conference is a three-day bi-annual youth conference hosted by the church's youth ministry, Elevate. From 2016 to 2023, the event was known as the MOVE Youth Discipleship Conference before the name change in 2025. Similar to the IDC, MOVE is hosted by CCF and involves multiple international speakers.

==== Other events ====
CCF also holds multiple conferences and events across its different ministries and has played host to events in collaboration with different churches and organizations. From 2024 to 2026, the church hosted events organized and in collaboration with Youth With A Mission (YWAM), including YWAM Together 2024 and The Send Pilipinas in 2026 (jointly held with the Cuneta Astrodome in Pasay).

== Beliefs ==
Christ's Commission Fellowship is a Trinitarian church believing that God has three persons in one deity; the Father, the Son (Jesus Christ) and the Holy Spirit. It believes in the divinity and humanity of Jesus. The CCF follows the sola fide doctrine, believing that faith alone guarantees salvation and not solely on good works or membership in a specific church, although good works are seen as an expected byproduct of faith. The senior pastor Peter Tan-Chi has also taught adherence to young-earth creationism, suggesting this is the position upheld by the church.

CCF chooses not to formally adopt a theological system such as Calvinism and Arminianism

CCF views marriage as a "sacred institution" exclusively between a man and a woman, both cisgender. Sexual intimacy is believed by CCF as reserved for heterosexual cisgender couples. The church believes that God created people as either as biological male or biological female. Rejection of one's assigned gender at birth is seen as a rejection of the image of God within oneself. It believes that homosexuality is a "lifestyle" and "a choice" rather than an innate condition. In line with these beliefs, the church openly opposes the proposed SOGIE Equality Bill in the Philippines, viewing it as inconsistent with biblical principles and their beliefs.

== See also ==
- Evangelicalism in the Philippines
- List of the largest evangelical churches
- List of the largest evangelical church auditoriums
