= DWSW =

Radyo Sagada (DWSW)
- Sagada; Philippines
- Broadcast area: Sagada and surrounding areas
- Frequency: 104.7 MHz
- Branding: Radyo Sagada 104.7

Programming
- Languages: Bontoc, Filipino
- Format: Community radio

Ownership
- Owner: National Council of Churches in the Philippines
- Operator: Kodao Productions

History
- First air date: November 11, 2011

Technical information
- Licensing authority: NTC
- Power: 1,000 watts

DWSW (104.7 FM), broadcasting as Radyo Sagada 104.7, is a radio station owned by the National Council of Churches in the Philippines and operated by Kodao Productions. Its studio and transmitter are located in Ato, Barangay Poblacion, Sagada. It serves as the community station for the people of Sagada.
