= Church of the Foursquare Gospel in the Philippines =

Christian denomination in the Philippines

- Jesus Christ the Savior, Baptizer, Healer, Coming King
- Abbreviation: CFGPI
- Type: Christianity (Western)
- Classification: Protestant
- Orientation: Pentecostal
- Scripture: Bible
- Polity: Modified episcopal
- Governance: Board of Directors
- President: Rev. Dr. Samuel B. Pinzon
- Vice President: Rev. Daniel G. Feleo
- Corporate Secretary: Atty. Celestino O. Domingo
- Associations: Philippine Council of Evangelical Churches; Pentecostal World Fellowship
- Region: Worldwide, especially Philippines
- Headquarters: Foursquare Center #1 F. Castillo Street, Marilag, Project 4, Quezon City 1109
- Origin: 1973; Manila
- Branched from: International Church of the Foursquare Gospel
- Members: 173,882
- Tertiary institutions: 7
- Other name: The Foursquare Church
- Official website: www.foursquare.org.ph

The Church of the Foursquare Gospel in the Philippines, Inc. (CFGPI) is a Pentecostal Christian denomination in the Philippines.

It is the national church body affiliated with the International Church of the Foursquare Gospel, based in Los Angeles, California. It is one of the largest and fastest growing churches in the Philippines, doubling in size between 2008 and 2022. As of Dec 31, 2025, it has 173,882 members.

== History ==
The Church of the Foursquare Gospel in the Philippines has its origins as a mission of the International Church of the Foursquare Gospel, which began in 1949. The Church was officially founded in 1973.

== Organization ==
Nationally, the CFGPI is run by a board of directors. It consists of a president, vice president, secretary, treasurer, general supervisor, and five members.

== Bible Colleges ==
- Foursquare Bible College – Quezon City
- Foursquare Bible College, Romblon Campus Inc. – Odiongan, Romblon
- Laoag Foursquare Bible College – Laoag City
- NorPhil Foursquare Bible College – Baguio City
- Pangasinan Foursquare Bible College – Dagupan City
- Cebu Foursquare Bible College – Cebu City
- Iloilo Foursquare Bible College – Iloilo City
- Halls of Life Foursquare Bible College - Davao City

== See also ==
- International Church of the Foursquare Gospel
