= Lutheran Church in the Philippines =

Lutheran denomination in the Philippines

- Abbreviation: LCP
- Type: Christianity (Western)
- Classification: Protestant
- Orientation: Lutheran
- Scripture: Bible
- Polity: Episcopal
- Governance: Board of Directors and Officers
- President: Rev. Antonio del Rio Reyes
- Vice President: Rev. Felipe B. Ehican, Jr.
- Secretary: Rev. Henry Paul D. Roa
- Associations: Lutheran World Federation; International Lutheran Council; National Council of Churches in the Philippines; Christian Conference of Asia; World Council of Churches
- Region: Philippines
- Language: Filipino, Other Philippine regional languages, English
- Headquarters: Lutheran Center #4461 Old Santa Mesa Street, Santa Mesa, Manila, Philippines
- Origin: 1957
- Branched from: Lutheran Church–Missouri Synod
- Members: ~58,000
- Official website: www.lutheranph.org

The Lutheran Church in the Philippines is a Lutheran denomination in the Philippines. It was founded by Lutheran Church–Missouri Synod missionaries in 1957.

The Lutheran Church in the Philippines is a member of the Lutheran World Federation, which it joined in 1973, and of the International Lutheran Council. It is also a member of the National Council of Churches in the Philippines. The church's president is Antonio del Rio Reyes.
