= Word International Ministries =

- Word International Ministries Logo
- Classification: Pentecostal
- Orientation: Evangelical
- Region: Worldwide
- Origin: 1970s Makati, Philippines
- Official website: www.wordinternationalglobal.com/home == Other websites == : Word International Ministries Learning Hub

Word International Ministries, also known as Word International (WIN), is a non-denominational Evangelical church based in the Philippines, with established presence in other countries.

== Etymology ==
The Word International Ministries’ name was derived from John 1:1 “In the beginning was the Word, and the Word was with God and the Word was God.” The church believes that Jesus Christ clearly impressed upon the church leaders that no endeavor will succeed if it does not start with God. Collectively, it was agreed by the church leadership that the name aside from identification purposes was to principally declare that Jesus Christ – the Creator, the Master – is the Lord of the church. Thus the Word, or the logos, became the church's main name. The inclusion of the word “International” was deemed necessary since the church's mandate extends outside the Philippines and the inclusion of the said word was influenced by the presence of WIN churches in numerous countries outside the Philippines by the time the name was adopted and was influenced by the Filipino diaspora. The addition of the word “ministries” was also necessary as the church believe that the door to servanthood and creative evangelism is the ministry. It will also be the main strategy in the achievement of the vision of the new church. The word WIN, which stands for Word International, was adopted to describe the mission and its people to remind its members to win the lost to the Lord.

== Doctrine ==
Word International Ministries core beliefs include:

- the Bible is divinely inspired Word of God
- that one God is revealed in three persons: the Father, the Son and the Holy Spirit
- the virgin birth of Jesus Christ and his complete humanity and sinless life, substitutionary atonement, crucifixion and subsequent resurrection, and his heavenly intercession
- the Lord Jesus Christ will return again
- the universal sinfulness of mankind
- the work of the Holy Spirit in conviction, repentance, regeneration and sanctification
- the baptism of the Holy Spirit "with signs following"
- that salvation is received by faith alone and evidenced by the fruit of the Spirit
- the baptism of believers by immersion and Communion.

== History ==
=== Early history ===
The church traces its origin as early as the 1970s in the Philippines, a period describe by the church as the “charismatic movement.” The Church's foundations were laid in Makati where a group of lay people who are at least college graduates including professionals, entrepreneurs, rank and file personnel and office workers initiated gatherings in various places outside churches and other traditional venues to hold bible studies and worship services. They met in their homes, in their offices during breaks, in functions rooms of business establishments and even hotels. The meetings of the group grew in frequency and number of attendees. The entry of seminary-trained men and women was an open alternative. In the second semester of 1979, a group of these lay church workers were meeting regularly to study the Bible, to have fellowship, and to pray. One of those who would meet regularly was a small group composed of lay people from the International Charismatic Service (ICS), an Assemblies of God Fellowship. They met regularly in a bible study in a Makati Subdivision led by a Church of God missionary, and evolved finally as Word for the World Christian Fellowship.

Their regular meetings were moved from a small residence to a progressively bigger place as the membership of the church grew. They went from renting a disco to a function room, to the ballroom of the Hotel Intercontinental and later the Rizal Theater. They held worship services on Sunday and on Thursdays.

The King's Highway was later established allowing World International Ministry to establish its presence outside Metro Manila throughout the country under the initiative of Bro. Joseph Samson.

=== Expansion outside the Philippines ===
The 1970s was also the decade where many Filipinos went to countries abroad as Overseas Filipino Workers. same decade saw the migration of Filipino workers to other nations all over the globe. The Overseas Filipino Workers community and lay members are a big influence to the establishment of churches abroad.

In 1984, the church targeted Hong Kong as its first overseas mission outreach. In late 1986, Bro. Chito Cordero together with Bro. Raymond Lim of the Church of Singapore-Balestier established a Bible study targeting the Filipinos in Singapore. Sisters Liza Mayo, Elvie Sinel, Marcia Anderson followed shortly.

In 1988, Bro. Lito Estanislao of the Cell Ministry and Christian Couples Ministry in Makati migrated with his family and established a church in Sydney, Australia. By 1990, the efforts of Bro. Priam and Sis. Marlyn Guiuan led to the establishment of the church in Los Angeles, United States.

The missionary couple, Bro. Rene and Rosanna Nepomuceno were sent to pastor the church in Dubai, United Arab Emirates as a follow up on a work that was formally received by Bro. Joseph Samson. The local church in Dubai was organized leading to various other works in others parts of the Middle East.

In the 1990s, the church increased its presence in the United States and established itself in Canada and Europe. In 1992, Bro. Ed Miciano, a former Youth Ministry worker, sought to stabilize the work done in San Francisco, California initiated by Bro. Elmer Salazar, who was also a former Youth worker, into becoming a local church. Succeeding years saw Bro. Alberto “Chito” Cordero arriving to pastor the Los Angeles church. Later, Bro. Dino Miciano was sent to pastor the church in Seattle, Washington that was initiated by Roderick “Dondi” Castillo. At the same time, Bro. Vicente “Jun” Que Jr. and Bro Rolando “Rollie” Pascual saw the establishment of a church in Vancouver, British Columbia in Canada. In December 1992, Bro Babes and Sis. Nickie Paulate, the National Overseer then of the church were transferred to the United States to oversee the expansion of the Filipino ministries developing towards Canada.

In 1994, the works in Europe started in the Netherlands through the efforts of Bro. Bani and Sis Cecila “Ching” Lansang with the help of the Paulates, the Guiuans, and the Nepomucenos. In the same year a church was planted in Switzerland. In the same year, Bro Gonga “Butch” and Sister Manju Yu were sent to pastor the church in Singapore. Bro Francisco Guinto, an engineer from the Middle East and some friends started the works in Calgary, Alberta, Canada. Pastor Ramon Solidum, also another engineer and a former pastor of the church in Saudi Arabia pastored the church in Toronto, Canada. On the same year another church in Toronto was established through the efforts of workers from Dubai in the United Arab Emirates under Bro. Edgar Gelacio. These churches were either pastored by missionaries that came from the Youth, Young Adults and Christian Couples Ministries, and other professionals.

In the early 1990s, To address the needs and the continuing growth of the fellowship in the Philippines, the Church of God created the COG National Urban Region under the leadership of Pastor Babes Paulate. The establishment of the COGNUR placed all the Word for the World Christian Fellowship (WWCF) under this office. By January 1993, Pastor Joseph E. Samson was appointed to replace Ptr. Babes who was appointed as the Assistant International Director of the fellowship based in the United States.

=== Leadership crisis and reorganization ===
By the late 1990s and into the 2000s, the establishment and strengthening of churches was becoming a reality in Canada, the United States and Western Europe. But then in the mid-1995, the occurrence of a crisis in church leadership led several of its pastors to found the need to establish a new church.

The leaders who have been meeting for more than a year once again met for the last time to strengthen the churches worldwide. 80 churches all over the Philippines including the majority of the churches abroad unified together. In June 1997, the first church service in Makati was organized. And on August 4, 1997, the pastors registered the Word International Ministries as a non-profit organization and was certified by the Securities and Exchange Commission of the Philippines under SEC No. A- 1997–13753. Churches outside the Philippines likewise formally organized and registered in their respective countries.

In November 1997, the Word International Ministries (WIN) gathered in Tagaytay for its first Pastors and Pastor's Wives conference which culminated with a National Gathering held at the Mandaluyong Gym. The theme for the said gathering was “A New Beginning.” 2000 members came to attend the gathering filling the gym to the Gym.

==== First national gathering ====
On its first national gathering in November 1997, Two thousand members attended the worship convergence held at the Mandaluyong City Gym. The city government of Mandaluyong granted the use of the gym for free. During the said gathering, new vision and mission statements were introduced. Likewise a new global cry “Win the World for God's Glory,” was also adopted. In 1998 another gathering with a theme, “Each One Win One,” was held at the Ramada Hotel in Manila. 3000 people attended the gathering. The year 1999 also marked the launching of the Word Leadership Institute (WLI) which gave the church a structured equipping and edifying programs. In 2000, another gathering was held at the Makati City Gym with the theme “Getting Closer, Growing Stronger,”. An estimated crowd of 4000 came to join the Gathering. In 2004, in spite of a super typhoon that hit the country, a National Pastors and Pastor's Wives conference was held at the WIN Pasig church. A National gathering followed held at the Ynares Sports Complex in Antipolo with theme “Bayan Ko Aaabutin Ko.” 5000 people attended the said gathering.

==== Reorganization ====
In June 2001, the leaders of Word International Ministries from the Philippines, Asia, Canada, the Middle East, Europe and the United States met in Burbank in Los Angeles, California, United States. The objective of that meeting was to consolidate the leadership as well as the structure of the church worldwide. On this year also, two more churches were added on the lists, the WIN New Jersey started by Mando Zacharias, and another one in Israel by Ferdie Melendres.

=== Continued expansion ===
By 2002, Word International Ministries has outreaches and influences in more than 26 countries with over 200 churches worldwide. In the said meeting the International leaders structured the church to have five regions, namely, The Philippines and the Pacific islands, Asia, Europe and the Middle East, Canada, and the USA. Pastors Joseph E. Samson, Butch Yu, Rene Nepomuceno, Ronaldo de Villa, Chito Cordero were appointed as regional directors respectively. Pastor Babes Paulate was also installed as the first International Director of the Church. It was also agreed that the WIN Los Angeles becomes the official and corporate address of the International office.

A ministry was founded in Ireland in 2002, and in September 2003 works in Myanmar was added. The Hong Kong ministry was re-established in May 2004. Attempts to establish works in Japan and Nepal were made. In April 2004, the second International Leaders Meeting and Conference was held at a venue owned by Meralco in Antipolo, Philippines. The year 2004 ended with a Pastors and Pastor's wives conference at the Valle Verde Country Club in Pasig. Meanwhile, the ministry continued to grow, and in 2006, new church was established in New York, and in 2014 another church in Massachusetts.

== Ministries ==
With people continually being added, Under Bro. Emerito “Babes” Paulate, the church established various ministries such as Christian Couples, Young Adults, Youth, Cell ministry, Reach Youth, Singles, and the Growth Program Institute (GPI). The establishing of churches outside the Makati area was then led by Bro. Joseph E. Samson, which saw the mobilization of other lay leaders even those from the provinces. These people later become ministry heads, Bible study teachers and some became pastors. Continuity was also ensured as various training and equipping modules were developed, combined with basic discipling and mentoring methods. The Growth Program Institute, or the GPI, had become the main training program of the fellowship.

The Word International Ministries seeks to expand its presence through an outreach ministry named The King's Highway. It has established itself outside Metro Manila under Bro. Joseph Samson. The project seeks to conduct Bible study in a certain province with the later intent to conduct regular worship services until it becomes a local church that has the capability to conduct its own outreaches.

== Headquarters ==
Its corporate office is located at Cityland Condominium, Herrera Tower, VA Rufino corner Valero Street, Makati.
