= List of regional languages of the Philippines =

There are 19 recognized regional languages in the Philippines as ordered by the Department of Education (Philippines) under the Mother Tongue-Based Multi-Lingual Education (MTB-MLE) strategy:

- Aklanon
- Bikol
- Cebuano
- Chavacano
- Hiligaynon
- Ibanag
- Ilocano
- Ivatan
- Kapampangan
- Kinaray-a
- Maguindanao
- Maranao
- Pangasinan
- Sambal
- Surigaonon
- Tagalog
- Tausug
- Waray
- Yakan

== Objective ==
The Philippines' Department of Education first implemented the program in the 2012–2013 school year. Mother Tongue as a subject is primarily taught in kindergarten and grades 1, 2 and 3. The adoption of regional languages as a medium of teaching is based on studies that indicate that the use of mother tongues as languages of instruction improves the comprehension and critical thinking skills of children and facilitates the learning of second languages such as English and Filipino.

== Other languages ==
Approximately more than 175 languages and dialects in the Philippines form part of the regional languages group. A few of these are spoken in island communities such as Abaknon in Capul island.
