= Evangelicalism in the Philippines =

Evangelicalism is of the minor Christian denominations in the Philippines and is the fourth most widespread, followed closely by Iglesia ni Cristo and Hinduism.

According to the 2000 Census, 2.8% of Filipinos identified as Evangelicals. This figure has risen to 14% as of 2017.

The Philippine Council of Evangelical Churches (PCEC), an organization of more than seventy Evangelical and Mainline Protestant churches, and more than 210 parachurch organizations in the Philippines, counts more than 11 million members as of 2011.

== Population and organizations ==
Overseas Filipinos from the Philippines have settled abroad and spread their religion, including Evangelicalism. The UAE, a country with many OFWs, has about four Evangelical churches.

The following table shows the percentage of Filipino Evangelicals to other Christian denominations in the Philippines.

Evangelicalism	Roman Catholic	Iglesia ni Cristo	Protestantism
2.8%	70.9%	2.3%	8%

Note: the table depicted above shows the Evangelical percentages in Philippines prior to the year 2000. Philippines’ Christian population most likely had increased or decreased over the years.

=== Filipino Evangelical Organizations and churches ===
Filipino Evangelical churches have expanded over the years, most notably The Evangelical Church Diaspora (TECD), formerly The Evangelical Church of Dubai. The TECD includes some Indian converts.
