= Bread of Life Ministries International =

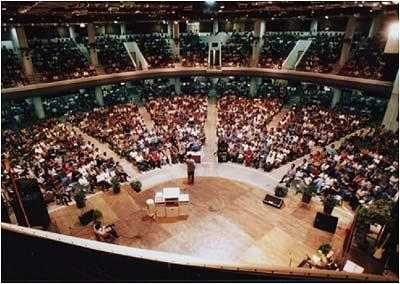
- Worship in 1998
- Location: Crossroad Center, Mother Ignacia cor. Scout Reyes, Quezon City, Philippines
- Country: Philippines
- Denomination: Evangelical Christian; Non-denominational
- Website: http://bolmcrossroad.com

History
- Former name: Bread of Life Christian Fellowship
- Status: Megachurch
- Founded: 1982
- Founder: Rev. Butch Conde

Architecture
- Functional status: Active
- Style: Modern
- Groundbreaking: August 1993
- Completed: November 1998

Clergy
- Pastors: Rev. Butch Conde (Senior Pastor Emeritus); Rev. Noel Tan (Senior Pastor); Ptr. Pipo Conde (Crossroad Center Head Pastor)

Bread of Life Ministries International (BOLMI; previous name Bread of Life Christian Fellowship; simply known as BOL or Bread) is a Filipino Evangelical megachurch founded by Rev. Caesar "Butch" L. Conde. It was founded in Quezon City in 1982.

Its stated mission and vision is to "stabilize and expand what it has learned from God in prayer and the Word of God and to pass it on to other people, and also the beginning of revival in the country", which is inspired by Acts 1:8.

== History ==
In the early 1980s, Pastor Butch Conde originally wanted to start a halfway house for prostituted women in Olongapo City, where the U.S. Naval Base Subic Bay was located. In August 1982, Pastor Conde and 11 other people started a new church in Loyola Heights, Quezon City. Maryknoll College (now Miriam College) offered its auditorium to launch the Bread of Life Christian Fellowship and the first service gathering was held on November 14, 1982. Attendance steadily increased.

Weekly attendance climbed to a thousand, prompting BOL to temporarily move to the Philippine Heart Center in Quezon City in January 1984 before moving again in the same month to Celebrity Sports Plaza in Capitol Hills, Quezon City in order to accommodate 1,200 people. Pastor Conde believed that Filipinos needed to break free from colonial mentality and become independent from foreign missionaries and wanted to show that God provides for Filipino churches.

After the People Power Revolution in 1986, Pastor Conde drew inspiration from his Korea Prayer Study Tour and Prayer Mountain experiences in South Korea. BOL then acquired a piece of land in the mountains in Antipolo, Rizal to build the country's and Southeast Asia's first Prayer Mountain facilities in 1988.

On April 5, 1987, BOL services moved to Circle Theatre (now Circle Events Place) and divided into four worship gatherings every Sunday. Between 1989 and 1991, it was one of the fastest-growing churches in the country with membership of up to 2,000 people in 1992. BOL then changed its name to Bread of Life Ministries. They planted another central church in Makati, and had been planting church satellites nationwide.

In August 1993, BOL began building its own ministry center in Quezon City. By this time BOL was an indigenous church, built without foreign help, financial assistance, political support, or church partnership.

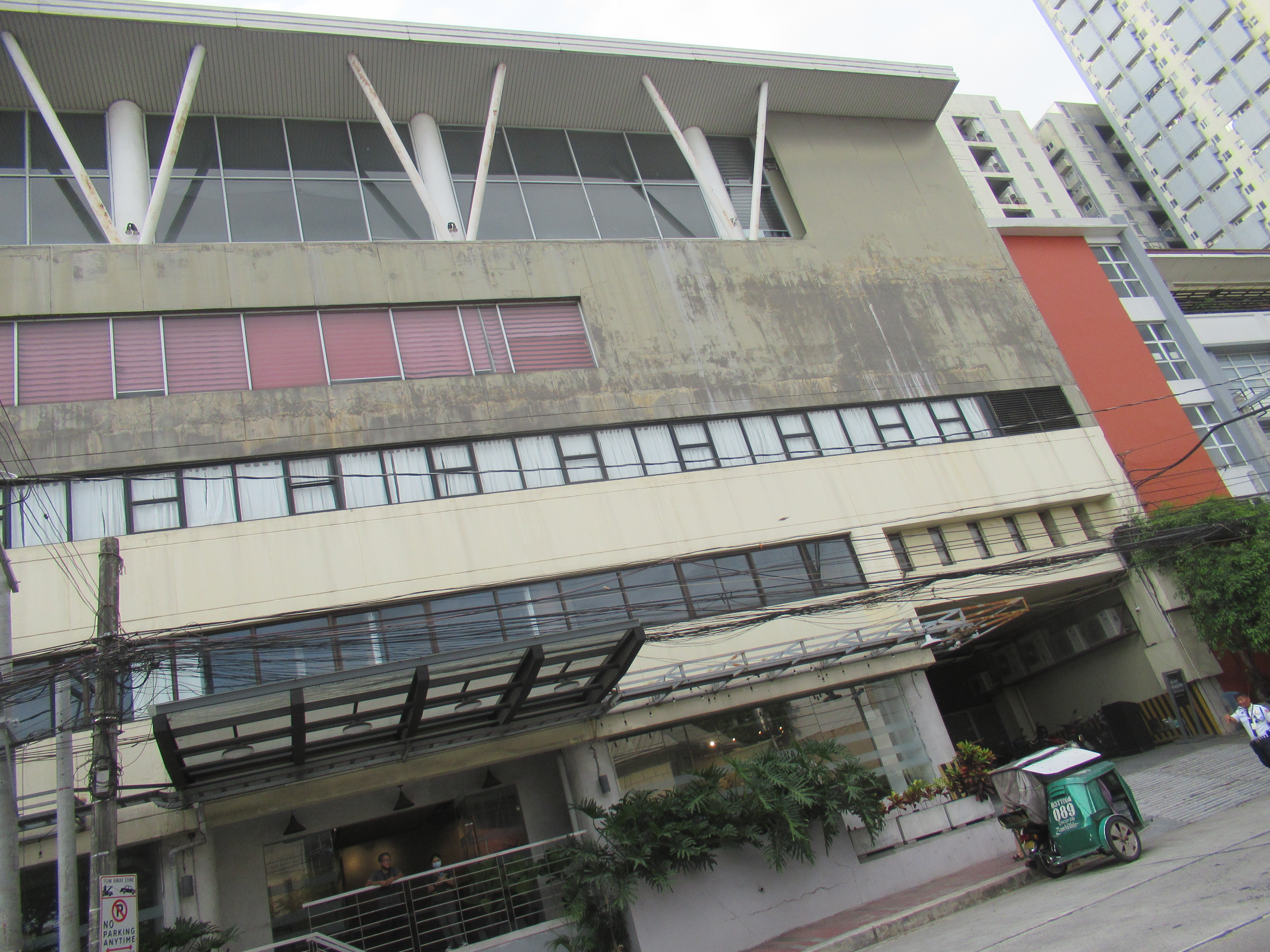
Crossroad Center, Mother Ignacia corner Scout Reyes Streets

In 1996, BOL started international outreach to Filipinos and other nationalities by founding BOL USA in Los Angeles, San Francisco, and San Diego, California. On November 29, 1998, the church dedicated Crossroad77 (now known as Crossroad Center) and weekly attendance averaged up to 2,500 each of the four service gatherings.

In 2001, BOL Makati split into two centers and transferred its worship services from Mondragon building to a larger space. BOL Makati is now located on Glorietta 4 (G4), and Greenbelt Onstage, the latter located at the Project Mosaic, 3F Greenbelt 1, Ayala Center, Makati.

In 2002, BOL established the Meridian International Learning Experience, a multilingual Christian school.

On November 25, 2007, BOL marked its 25th anniversary. The theme was the "Global Village 25/25", attended by thousands of members from BOL local and international outreaches. The celebration was held at Ynares Center, Antipolo, Rizal.

=== Bread of Life 30 Years ===
In 2012, Pastor Conde announced his retirement as senior pastor, having served as such for the past three decades. On May 20, 2012, the head pastor of BOL Makati and Singapore, Rev. Noel Tan, was installed as the new senior pastor.

In 2012 BOL celebrated its 30th anniversary with the theme "Perlas Ng Silangan: Bread of Life 30th Anniversary". The celebration was held at the SMX Convention Center on November 18, 2012, with approximately 15,000 attendees from different BOL outreaches worldwide. In the same year, BOL Glorietta 4 in Makati was transferred to F1 Hotel in Bonifacio Global City, and eventually transferred its worship gatherings in SM Aura, Taguig. This was later named BOL BGC (known as Mosaic BGC).

== Crossroad Center (Bread of Life Ministry Center) ==
Construction of the Crossroad Center (formerly Crossroad77) at Mother Ignacia Ave., Quezon City began in August 1993 and was completed in November 1998. It serves as BOL's international headquarters. Crossroad Center has five stories, two basement levels and two parking lots. It houses a 2,500-seat "Convenarium" for Sunday worship services and young adult ministries and a number of halls for other ministries covering different ages and life stages. Groups meet once a week for Bible study, fellowship and ministry work. The 3rd, 4th and 5th stories of the ministry center were also used as a community center which was supported by BOL.

== Core values ==
BOL's statement of faith includes its beliefs that:

- The Holy Scriptures are the verbally inspired Word of God in its entirety, sixty-six books consisting of the Old and New Testaments, the final authority for faith and life.
- There is one triune God, eternally existing in three Persons - Father, Son, and Holy Spirit - co-eternal in being, co-identical in nature, co-equal in power and glory, and having the same attributes and perfection.
- Man's necessity to be born again, regenerated by the Holy Spirit, in which he is no longer conformed to the world's system but redirected to the things of the Spirit in order to be saved; and that the only way to salvation is to turn in genuine faith from the heart to Jesus Christ as personal Lord and Savior.
- The Church, which is the body and espoused bride of Christ, is a spiritual organism made up of born-again persons, not any specific organization.
- The great commission is the obligation of the saved to witness by life and by word to the truths of the Holy Scripture and to seek to proclaim the Gospel to all mankind.

BOL's ongoing vision is to build a strong national uniqueness by becoming independent from foreign sources in order to rediscover Filipino Christian indigenous spirituality. BOL emphasizes the independence of the indigenous church and challenges other denominational churches to revive their identity through God's word as well. This belief is founded on the distinction which BOL applied to the uniqueness of the Christian journey by emphasizing the centrality of Christ, the foundation of Scriptures, prayer, and worship, operated by the power of God, the way of service through sacrifice and being people of faith.

== Congregations ==
BOL Crossroad Center, BOL Makati and BOL Cebu serve as the Philippines' central churches.

BOL have established satellite outreaches locally and internationally. There are 11 satellite outreaches with weekly attendance of around 15,000 to 20,000 people within Metro Manila. Provincial congregations have a total of 20 satellite outreaches. Additionally there are 13 international outreaches in Asia, Australia, the Middle East and Europe.

== Multimedia and online church ==
In the 1990s, BOL sermons were broadcast on 702 DZAS-AM radio, but this has since been discontinued. In BOL USA, live streams and video archives of sermons were shown on its website.

== Controversy ==
On October 18, 2004, BOL released a paid advertisement in the Philippine Daily Inquirer entitled “Misplaced Priorities Can Mislead the Nation” as part of the Kingdom Of A Higher World series, written by then-BOL Pastor Bong Saquing. The article featured an eleven-year-old girl, Faye San Juan, who claimed to win in an “Intercontinental Science Quiz Net” in Australia. After further scrutiny in the media, BOL began an investigation and found the story to be a hoax. BOL and Associate Pastor Jesmael M. Montaña (head of the Kingdom of a Higher World write-ups) issued a public apology to the media and cancelled the column.

== See also ==
- Protestants in the Philippines
