= Unida Church =

United Evangelical Church of Christ
- Iglesia Evangélica Unida de Cristo
- Church logo
- Classification: Protestant
- Orientation: Evangelicalism
- Polity: Unida
- General Superintentent: Rev. Jonathan Romaquin
- Associations: World Communion of Reformed Churches
- Region: Philippines
- Language: Filipino and English
- Founder: Don Toribio Teodoro
- Origin: January 3, 1932; Manila Grand Opera House, Manila, Philippines
- Merger of: Iglesia Cristiana Trinitaria; Iglesia Evangélica de Atlag; Iglesia Evangélica de los Christianos Filipinos; Iglesia Evangélica Metodista Reformada; La Iglesia de Dios; La Iglesia de Jesu-Cristo, "Jerusalén Nueva"
- Separations: Iglesia Unida Ekyumenikal (1994)
- Congregations: 94 local churches 79 mission churches and 11 International Missions
- Members: 25,000
- Tertiary institutions: 2: Unida Christian Colleges, Imus, Cavite; Unida Biblical Seminary, Silang, Cavite

The United Evangelical Church of Christ (Spanish: Iglesia Evangélica Unida de Cristo); commonly the Unida Church, Unida Christian Church or Unida Evangelical Church) is an evangelical Protestant denomination in the Philippines founded in 1932.

== History ==
The Church formed from the merger of six Filipino evangelical groups of Presbyterian and Methodist backgrounds, who met in Manila through the invitation of Don Toribio Teodoro, a layman and industrialist who was a member of the Iglesia Evangélica de los Cristianos Filipinos (Evangelical Church of the Filipino Christians). A church union was declared on 3 January 1932 at the former Manila Grand Opera House.

In May 2012, Unida Church celebrated its 80th founding anniversary at the Cuneta Astrodome.

The denomination has since grown to 25,000 members in some 94 congregations and 79 mission churches,and 11 International Missions with churches concentrated in Metro Manila, Southern Tagalog, Bulacan, and the Bicolandia; several congregations in the Northern Philippines, Visayas and Mindanao; and overseas congregations in Canada, Qatar, and Japan.

The church is a member of the World Communion of Reformed Churches. The Temple and Main Office, known as the Unida Christian Center, is located in Silang, Cavite, Philippines.

== See also ==
- Protestantism in the Philippines
- United Church of Christ in the Philippines
