= Philippine Council of Evangelical Churches =

Philippine Christian organization

- Founded: 1965; 61 years ago
- Type: Evangelical organization
- Headquarters: No. 62 Molave St., Project 3, Baranggay Duyan-Duyan, Quezon City, Philippines 1102
- Region served: Philippines
- Chairman: Dr. Andrew Liuson
- National Director: Bishop Noel A. Pantoja
- Affiliations: World Evangelical Alliance
- Website: pcec.org.ph

The Philippine Council of Evangelical Churches (PCEC) is a national evangelical alliance in the Philippines, member of the World Evangelical Alliance. With 89 Christian denominations members, and more than 200 para-church organizations in the Philippines, Evangelicals in the Philippines reportedly have 5,246,914 adherents according to the 2020 Philippine census, making Evangelical Christianity as the third (3rd) largest denomination in the country. (Note: Member churches of the Philippine Council of Evangelical Churches (PCEC) have a total of 2,469,957 members according to the 2010 Philippine census, making Evangelical Christianity as the third largest denomination in the Philippines. Evangelical population is also larger than that of the Iglesia ni Cristo or INC (which reportedly had 2,251,941 adherents in 2010). However, the total count was not reflected as member churches were treated separately in the 2020 Philippine census. The total number of adherents for Evangelical and PCEC member churches listed in the 2020 Philippine census would be 5,246,914 or 4.8 percent of the Filipino population. Adherents of member churches of the National Council of Churches in the Philippines (NCCP), meanwhile, total to 2,995,642 for the 2020 Philippine census, or 2.8 percent. This makes the NCCP as the fourth largest denomination in the Philippines after the Evangelicals, and the Iglesia ni Cristo (INC) as the fifth largest.) The head office is in Quezon City, Philippines.

== History ==
The PCEC was established by evangelical denominations in 1965.

In 2011, Dr. Cesar Vicente P. Punzalan, Deputy National Director of the Philippine Council of Evangelical Churches, estimated that 12% of the population were members of PCEC churches.

The 2015 Philippine census by the Philippine Statistics Authority found that 2.4 percent of the population of 101 million were members of PCEC churches, making it the fourth largest faith group in the Philippines after the Catholic Church (79.5%), Islam (6.0%), and Iglesia ni Cristo; and down from 2.7% in 2010.

As of 2020, it has 78 Christian denominations and 200 member organizations.

== See also ==
- National Council of Churches in the Philippines
- Christianity in the Philippines
- Evangelicalism in the Philippines
