= Christianity in the Philippines =

Christianity in the Philippines Kristiyanismo sa Pilipinas
- The Bible in Hiligaynon, 1912

Total population
- 98,240,844 (91.5 % of the total population)

Regions with significant populations
- Majority throughout the country (except in the Bangsamoro Autonomous Region in Muslim Mindanao)

Languages
- Filipino, Spanish, Latin, English, Bicolano, Aklanon, Waray, Bisaya, Ilocano, Hiligaynon, Pangasinense, Maranao, Kapampangan, Surigaonon, Karay-a, Ivatan, Chavacano, Ibanag, and various Philippine languages

The Philippines is the 5th largest Christian-majority country on Earth as of 2010, (Note: As of 2010, most Christians resided in the United States with 246.8 million, followed by Brazil with 175.8 million, Mexico with 107.8 million, and Russia with 105.2 million.) with about 93% of the population being adherents. As of 2019, it was the third largest Catholic country in the world and was one of the two predominantly Catholic nations in Asia.

According to the National Statistics Office's national census for the year 2010, an estimated 90.1% of Filipinos were Christians; this consisted of 80.6% Catholic, 4% Iglesia ni Cristo, 1.0% Aglipayan, 2.7% Evangelical groups, and 3.4% other Christian groups including other Protestant denominations (Baptist, Pentecostal, Anglican, Methodist, and Seventh-day Adventist) as well as Orthodox. Around 5.6% of the whole country was Muslim; about 1-2% were Buddhist; 1.8% of the entire population adhered to other independent religions, while less than 0.1% (as of 2015) were irreligious. With this, the Philippines has consistently demonstrated a low level of government restrictions on religion, ensuring that citizens are free to practice their faiths openly, with minimal interference from state authorities, which reflects the country's strong constitutional guarantee of religious freedom and diversity. According to the 2020 census, at least 84% of the population is Christian; about 79% belong to the Catholic Church while about 5% belong to Protestantism and other denominations such as Philippine Independent Church, Iglesia ni Cristo, Seventh-day Adventist Church, Apostolic Catholic Church, United Church of Christ in the Philippines, Members Church of God International (MCGI) and Pentecostals.

Many Filipinos in 2021 celebrated 500 years of Christian presence in the Philippines with Pope Francis commemorating March 16, the day Magellan introduced Catholicism with a mass on Limasawa, Leyte.

== History ==
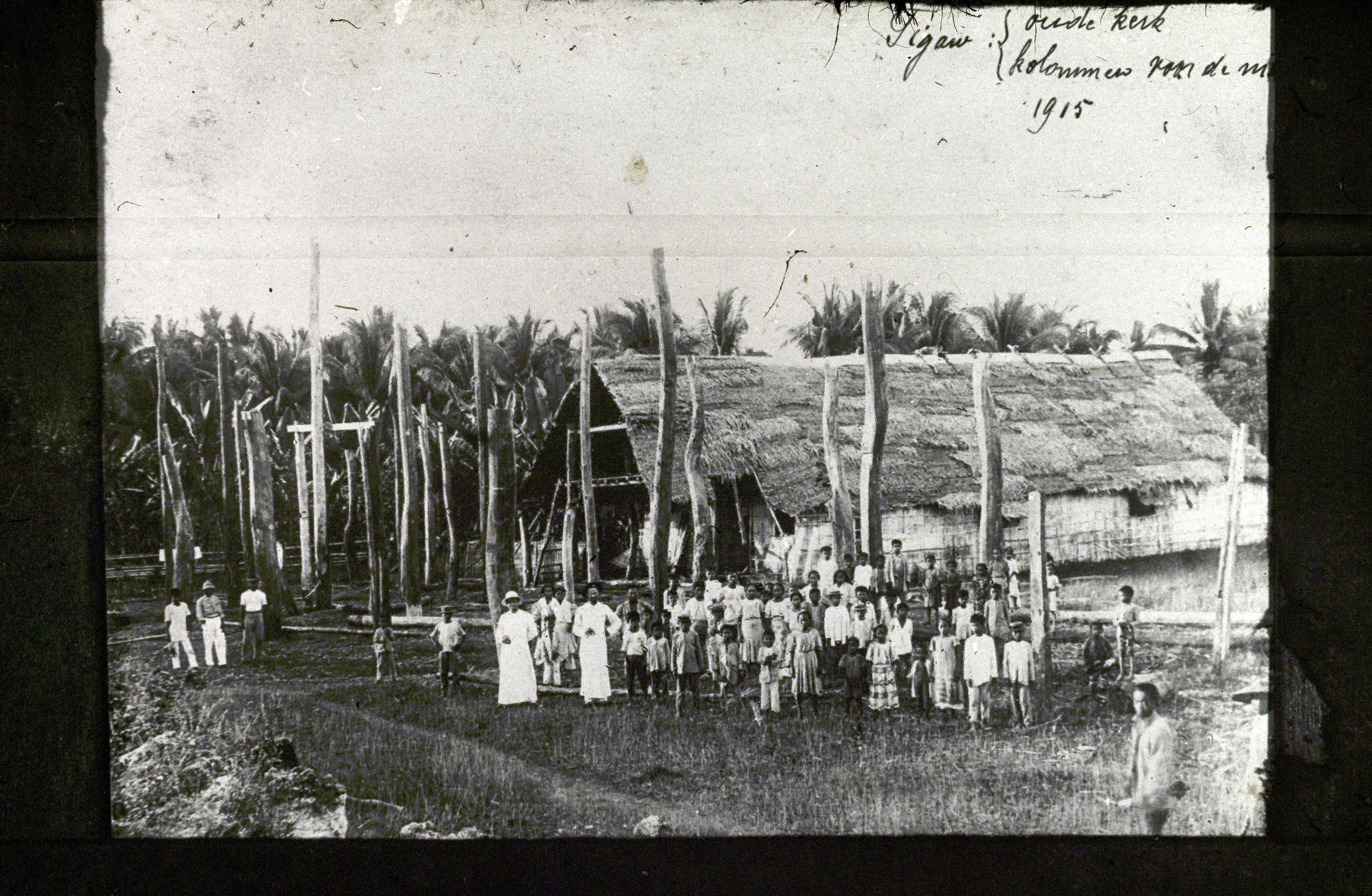
Missionaries of the Sacred Heart with villagers in front of a Catholic church in the Philippines, circa pre-1920

Early Christian presence in the Malay archipelago and the Philippine Islands may be traced to Arab Christian traders from the Arabian Peninsula. They had trade contacts with early Malayan Rajahs and Datus that had ruled these various Islands. Early Arabians had heard the gospel from Peter the Apostle at Jerusalem (Acts 2:11), as well as evangelized by Paul's ministry in Arabia (Galatians 1:17) and also by the evangelistic ministry of St Thomas. Later, these Arab traders along with Persian Nestorians, stopped by the Philippines on their way to Southern China for trade purposes. However, no solid efforts were made to evangelize the native population. With the spread of Islam in Arabia, much of the Christian heritage of Arabia had ended and the Arab travelers focused more on spreading Islam to Mindanao, through which they transmitted the knowledge of Jesus as a prophet to the Moro people.

In 1521, the Portuguese navigator and explorer Ferdinand Magellan under the service of Spain came across the Philippines while searching for the Spice Islands. Ferdinand Magellan and his men landed in Cebu Island in central Philippines.

At this time period, almost nothing was known to the West of the Philippines and so information on most pre-Hispanic societies in the islands date to the early period of Spanish contact. Most Philippine communities, with the exception of the Muslim sultanates in Mindanao and the Sulu Archipelago, were fairly small and lacking in complex centralised authority. This absence of centralised power meant that a minority of Spanish explorers were able to convert larger numbers of indigenous peoples than attempting such in larger, more organized, dominions such as the Indianised or Theravada Buddhist kingdoms in mainland Southeast Asia, the Malay Peninsula and the Indonesian Archipelago.

Bible used by a Sangley Anglicans of the Philippines.

With his arrival in Cebu on March 17, 1521, his first attempt was to colonize the islands and to Christianise its inhabitants. The story goes that Magellan met with Rajah Humabon, ruler of the island of Cebu, who had an ill grandson. Magellan (or one of his men) was able to cure or help the young boy, and in gratitude Humabon allowed himself, his chief consort Humamay, and 800 of his subjects to be baptised en masse. In order to achieve this, Spain had three principal objectives in its policy towards the Philippines: the first was to secure Spanish control and acquisition of a share in the spice trade; use the islands in developing contact with Japan and China in order to further Christian missionaries’ efforts there; and lastly to spread their religion.

After Magellan was killed by natives, the Spanish later sent Miguel López de Legazpi. He arrived in Cebu from New Spain (now Mexico), where Spain introduced Christianity and colonisation in the Philippines took place. He then established the first Permanent Spanish Settlement in Cebu in 1565. This settlement became the capital of the new Spanish colony, with Legazpi as its first governor. After Magellan, Miguel López de Legazpi conquered the Islamised Kingdom of Maynila in 1570. The Spanish missionaries were able to spread Christianity in Luzon and the Visayas, but the diverse array of ethno-linguistic groups in the highland areas of Luzon avoided Spanish annexation owing to their remote and difficult mountainous region. Sultanates in Mindanao retained the Islamic faith, which had been present in the southern Philippines since some time between the 10th and 12th century, had slowly spread north throughout the archipelago, particularly in coastal areas. This resistance to Western intrusion makes this story an important part of the nationalist history of the Philippines. Many historians have claimed that the Philippines peacefully accepted Spanish rule; the reality is that many insurgencies and rebellions continued on small scales in different places through the Hispanic colonial period.

== Important traditions ==
For most Filipinos, the belief in God permeates many aspects of life. Christians celebrate important holidays in many different ways, the most important of which are Christmas, Lent and Holy Week, All Souls' Day, as well as many local fiestas honouring patron saints and especially the Virgin Mary. Filipinos living and working in Metro Manila and occasionally those from the diaspora often return to their respective home provinces and towns to observe these holidays with their birth families, much like the practise in Mainland China for traditional holidays. Filipino infants and individuals are more often than not expected to be baptised as Christians to affirm faith in Christ and membership in a specific denomination.

=== Christmas ===
Christmas is the biggest holiday, and one of its most beloved rites is the Simbang Gabi or Misa de Gallo, a series of Masses held before dawn in the nine days preceding Christmas Day. Devotees attend each Mass (which is different from the otherwise Advent liturgy of the day elsewhere) in anticipation of Christ's birth and to honour the Virgin Mary, along with the belief that attending the novena ensures fulfilment of a favour requested of God. After the service, worshippers eat or buy a breakfast of traditional delicacies that are sold in churchyards, the most common being puto bumbóng and bibingka.

=== Lent ===
The second most important religious season is Lent, which commemorates Christ's Passion and Death, ending with Easter which celebrates the Resurrection. Beginning with Ash Wednesday, Lent has a sombre mood that becomes more pronounced as Holy Week (Semana Santa) arrives. Holy Week in the Philippines is a period especially rich in centuries-old tradition, which have undertones from indigenous customs and beliefs that date back to the pre-Christian period.

==== Customs ====
Practises include the continuous melodic recital of the Pasyón, a 17th-century epic poem which narrates Biblical stories and the life of Christ, with a focus on the Passion narrative (hence its name). Adapted from the ancient Filipino art of orally transmitting poems through chant, the devotion is usually performed by groups of individuals, each member chanting in shifts to ensure complete, unbroken recitation of the text. Theatre troupes or towns meanwhile stage Passion plays called Senákulo, which are similar to its European predecessors in that there is no universal text, that actors and crew are often ordinary townsfolk, and that it depicts Biblical scenes related to Salvation History other than the Passion.

The Visita Iglesia is the praying of the Stations of the Cross in several churches (often numbering seven) on either Maundy Thursday or Good Friday. Processions are a staple throughout the week, the most important being on Holy Wednesday, Good Friday (where the burial of Christ is reenacted with a town's Santo Entierro image) and the joyous Salubong that precedes the first Mass on Easter Sunday.

Fasting and abstinence is undertaken throughout the season and traditional taboos are enforced on Good Friday, usually after 3:00 p.m. PHT (UTC+8) - the time Christ is said to have died - all through Black Saturday until the Easter Vigil. Television and radio limit broadcasting hours and air mostly inspirational programming alongside the days' religious services; newspapers are also on hiatus, while shopping malls and most restaurants are closed to allow employees to return home. Popular holiday spots such as Boracay often dispense with these customs, while many people use the long holiday for overseas travel instead of observing the traditional rites.

=== Other festivals ===
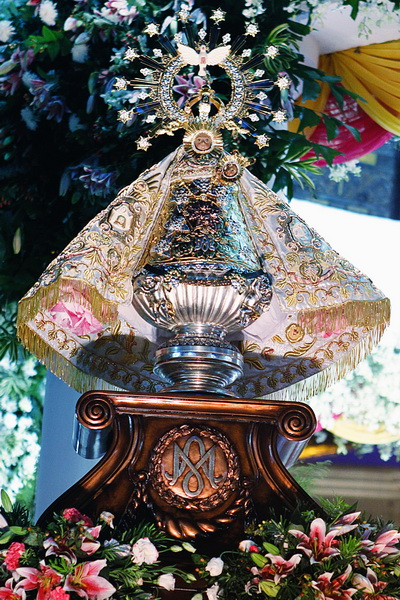
Our Lady of Peñafrancia in Naga City, Camarines Sur

Other observances include All Saints' Day and All Souls' Day in November, which are taken as one season called Undás (traditionally known in English as Allhallowtide). As with Christmas and Lent, most Filipinos also return home in the period (the third most important in the calendar), but with the main intent of visiting and cleaning ancestral tombs.

January itself has two important Christological feasts: the Feast of the Translation of the Black Nazarene on January 9, where the image is returned to its shrine in Quiapo Church in a day-long procession of millions; and the Feast of the Santo Niño de Cebú (Holy Child Jesus) every Third Sunday of January, with the largest celebrations being held in Cebu City.

In May, the Flores de Mayo (literally, "Flowers of May") is when small altars are bedecked with flowers in honour of the Virgin Mary. Communities also hold the Santacruzan, which is part-procession honouring the finding of the Cross (on its old Galician date), and part-fashion show for a town's maidens.

In addition, most any place that has a patron saint (often barangays, towns, Catholic schools, and almost every church) holds a fiesta, where the saint's image is processed and feted with traditional foods, funfairs, and live entertainment on his/her feast day, which is often declared a holiday for the area. Examples of patronal fiestas are the Nativity of St John the Baptist every June 24, where communities under his patronage would celebrate his summertime birth by splashing other people with water, and the triduum of feasts known as the Obando Fertility Rites held in mid-May, where devotees dance for fertility in a custom that has ancient animist roots.

== Notable people ==
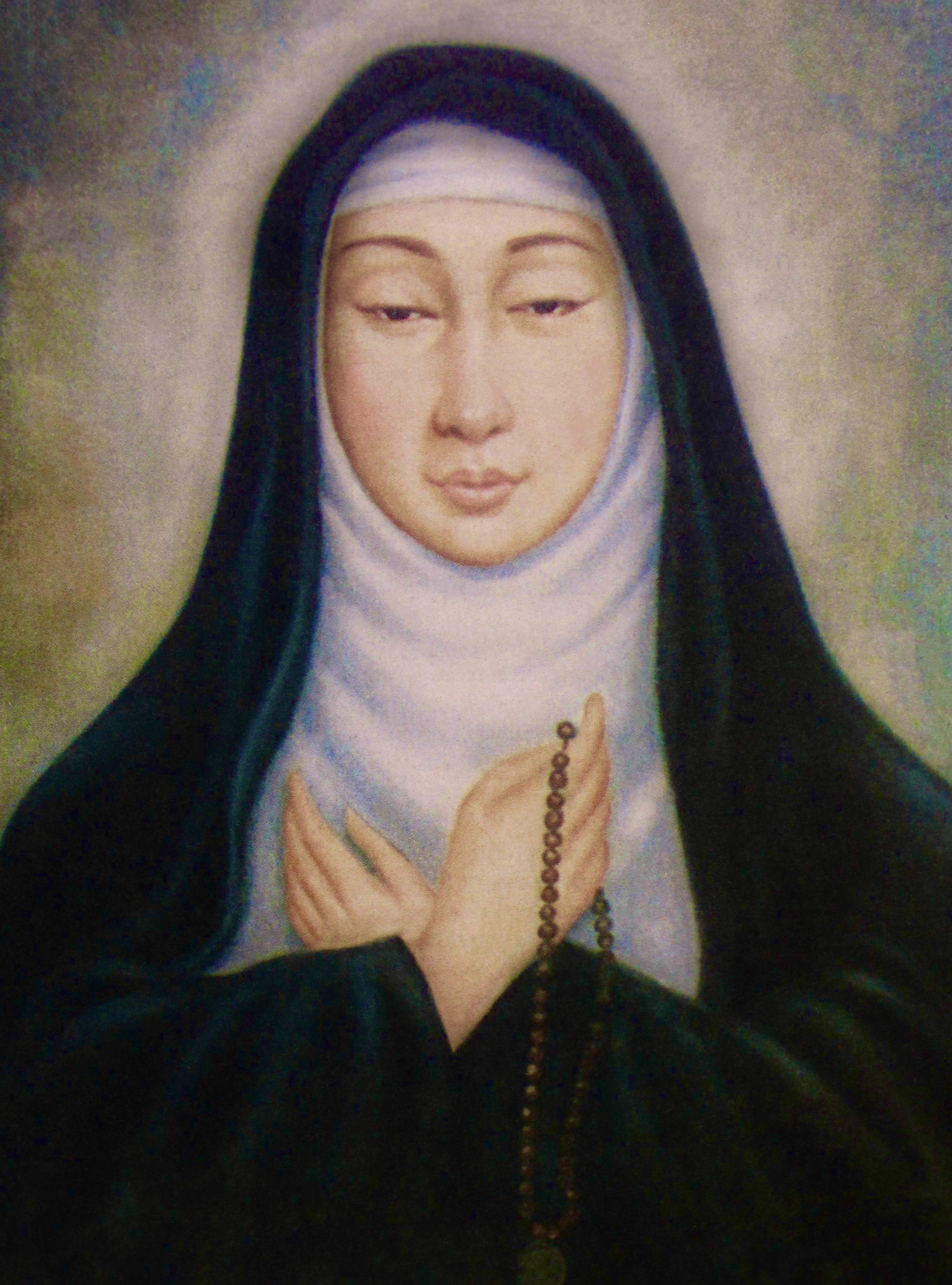
Venerable Mother Ignacia

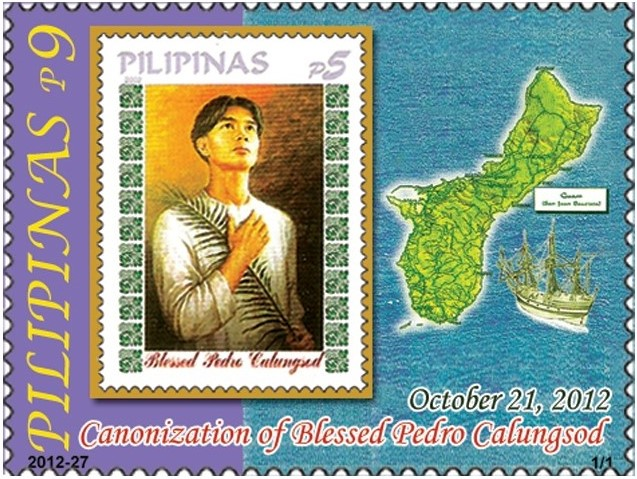
Saint Pedro Calungsod

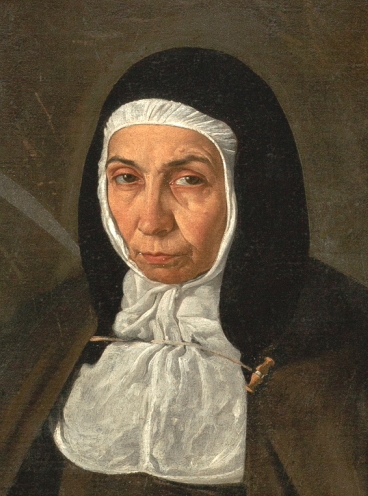
Jerónima de la Asunción

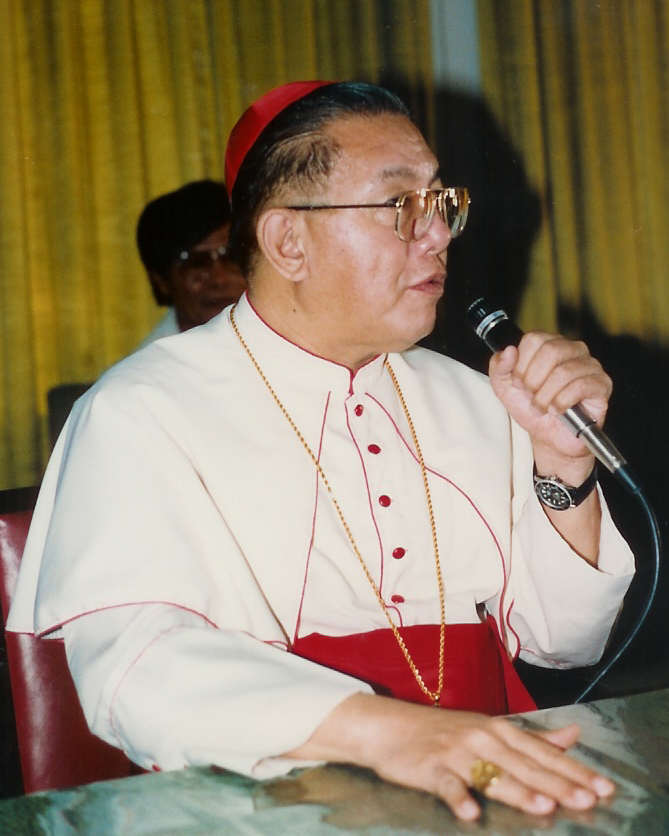
Jaime Cardinal Sin, 30th Archbishop of Manila instrumental in the 1986 People Power Revolution

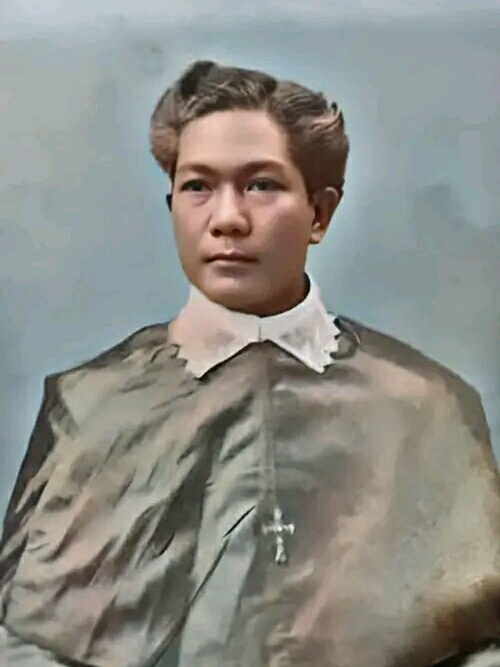
Gregorio Aglipay, a co-founder and the first supreme bishop of the nationalist church Iglesia Filipina Independiente, the first-ever wholly Filipino-led independent Christian catholic church in the country

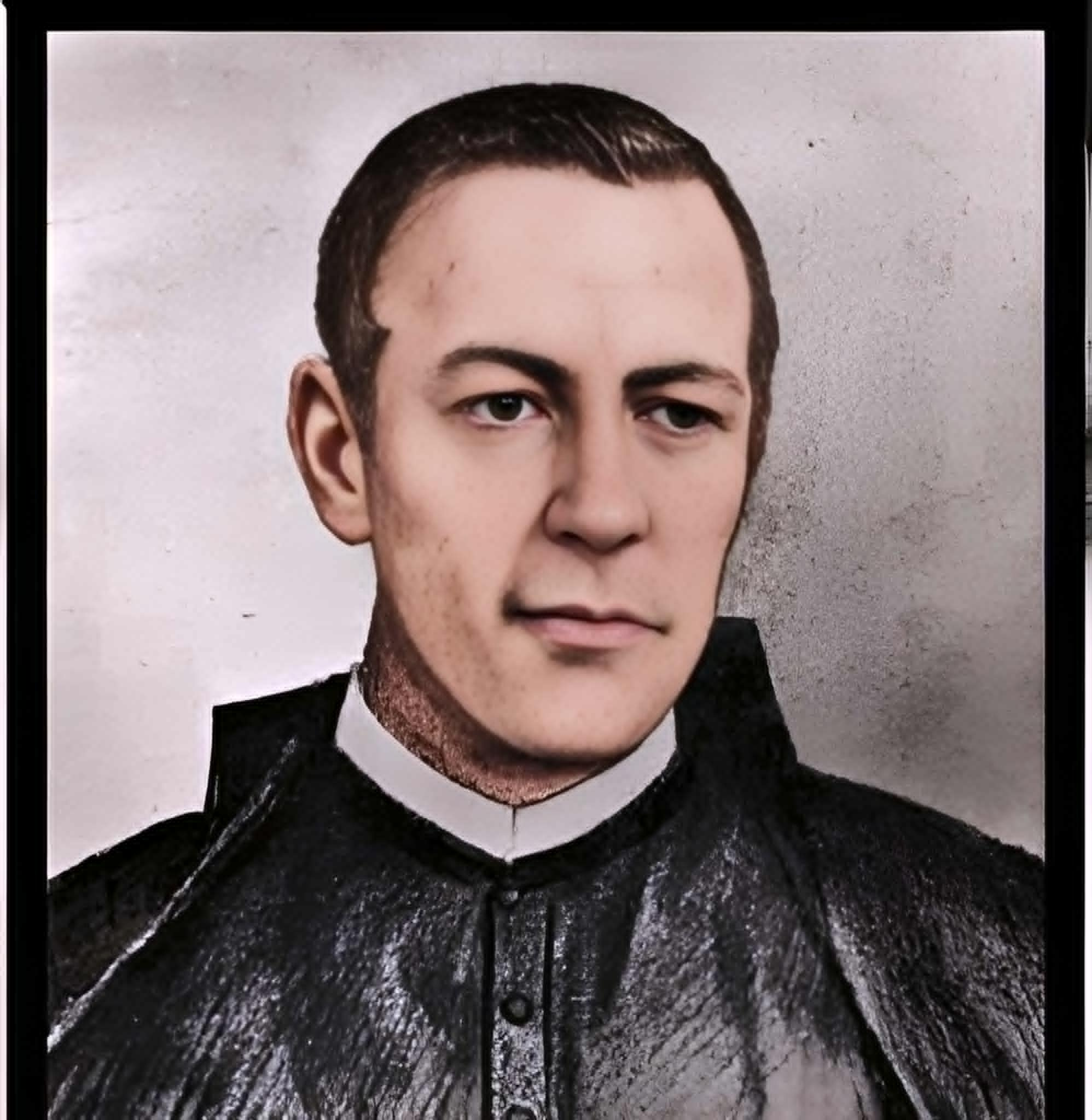
Pedro Pelaez

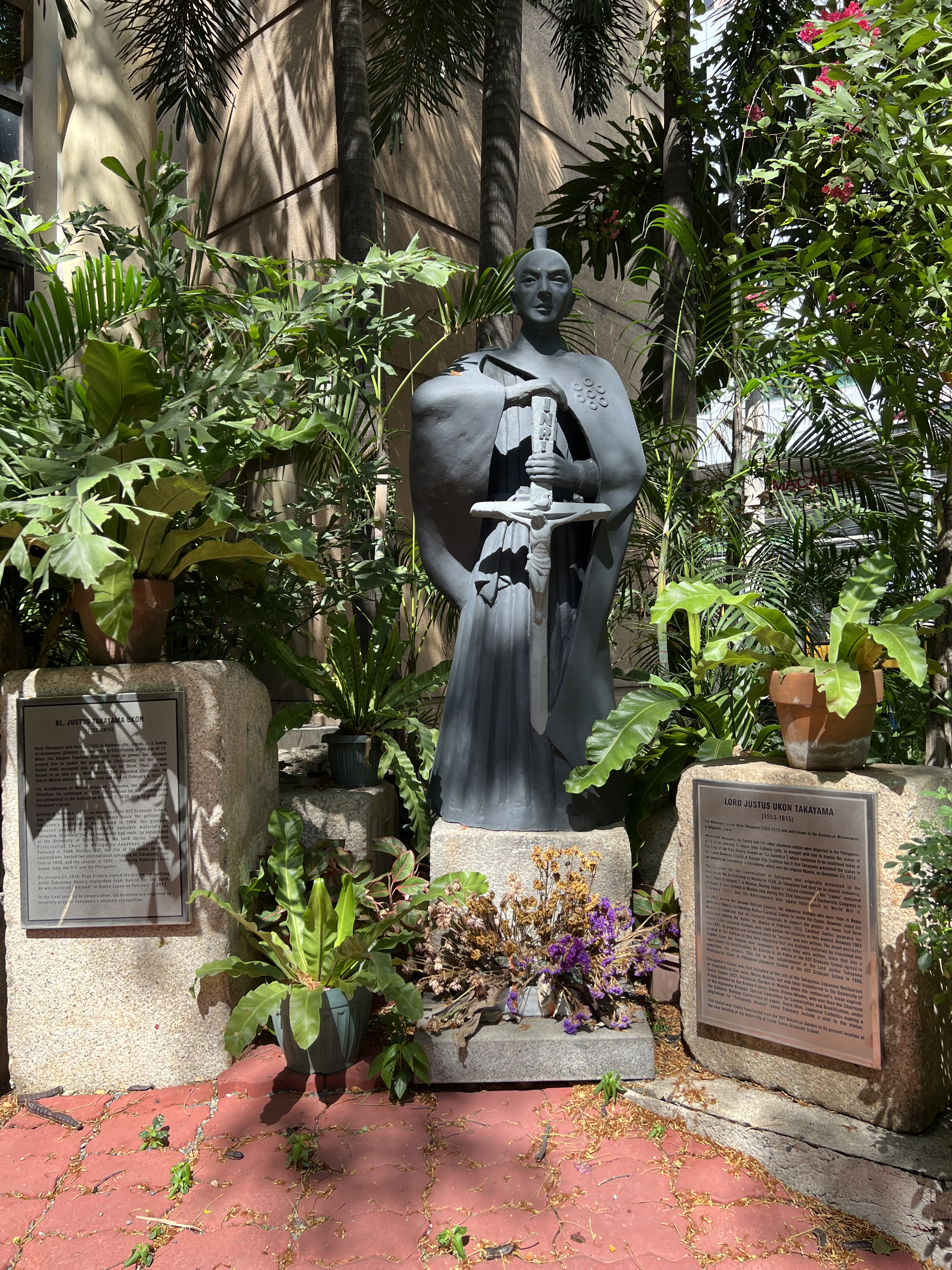
saint Justo Takayama

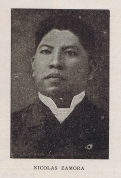
Minister Nicolás Villegas Zamora

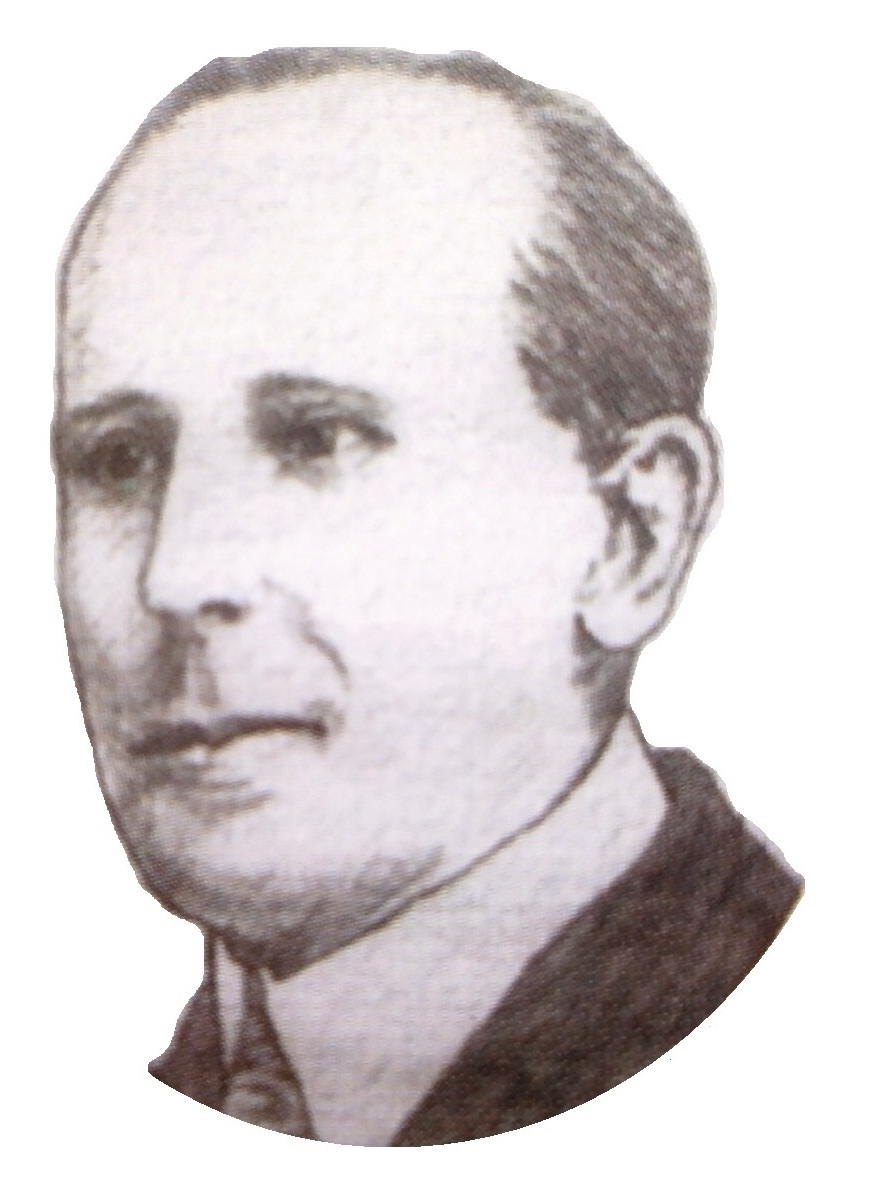
William Valentine

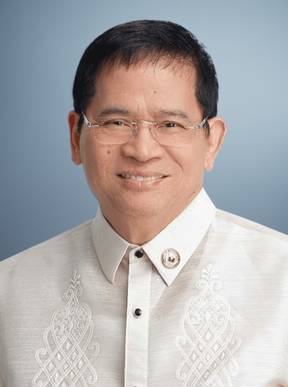
Eddie Villanueva

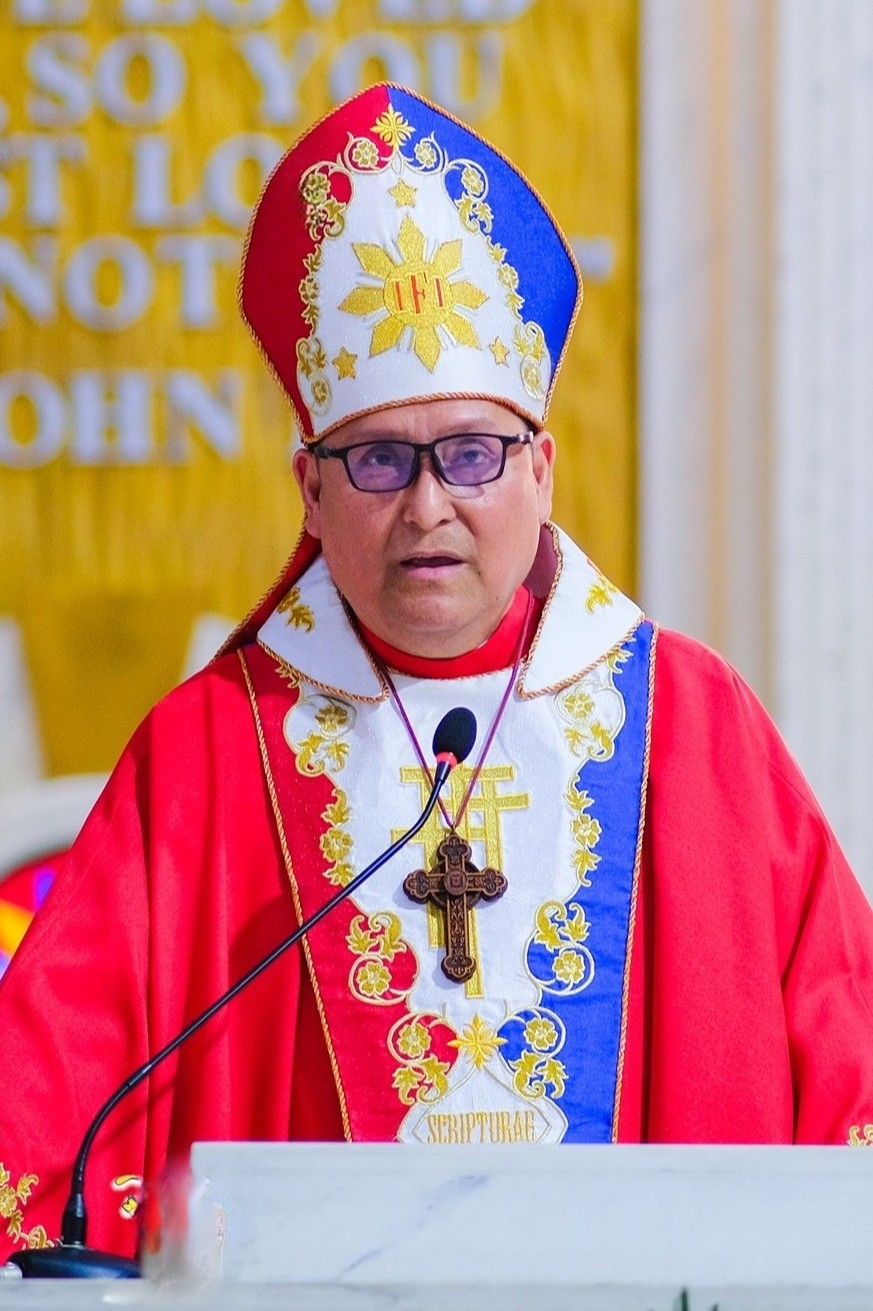
Joel Porlares

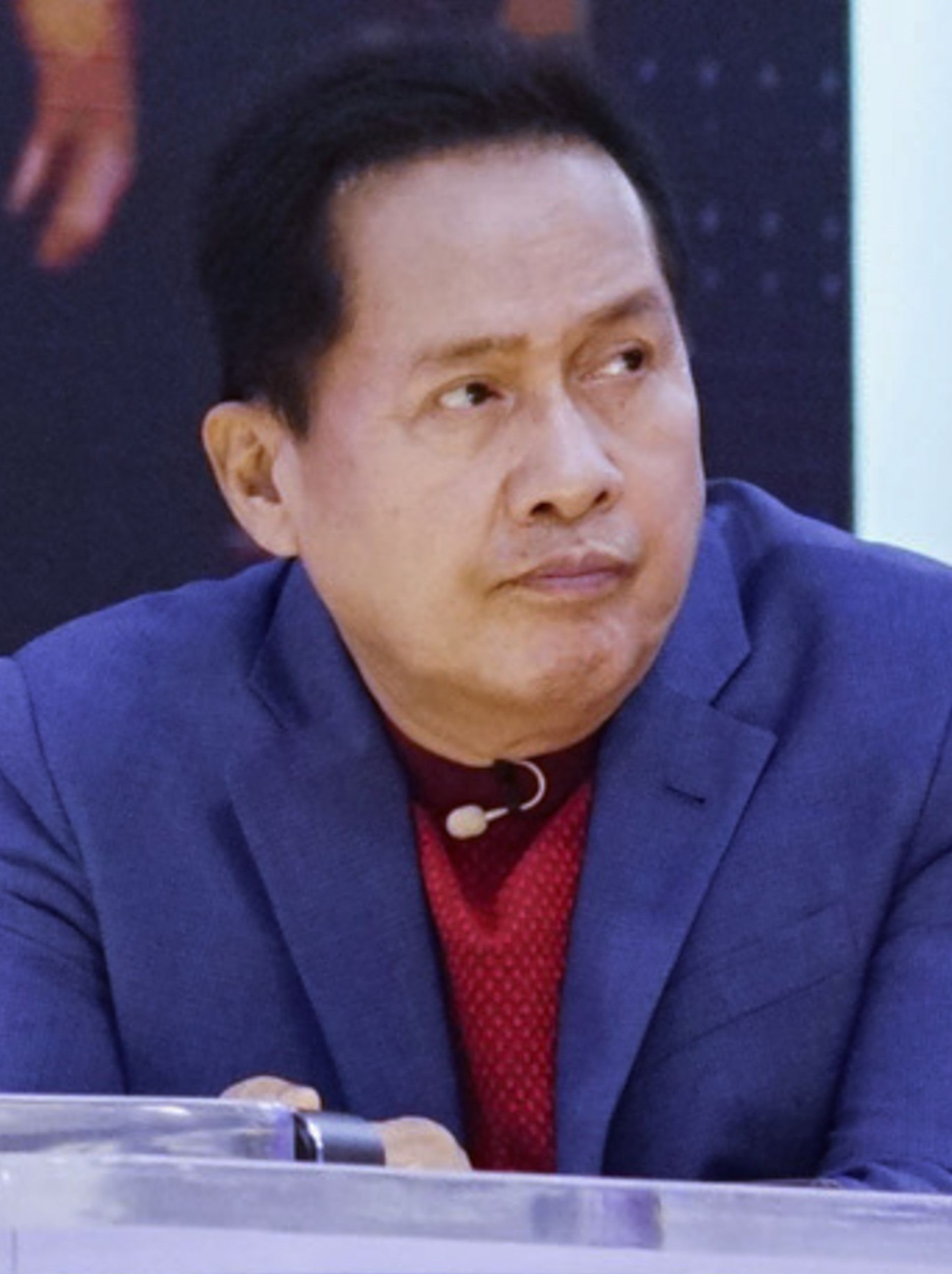
Apollo Quiboloy, founder and leader of the Kingdom of Jesus Christ

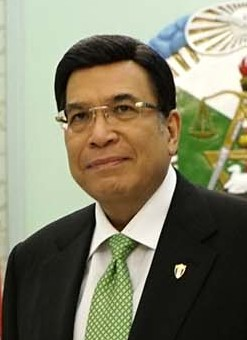
Eduardo V. Manalo

== See also ==
- Catholic Church in the Philippines
- Eastern Orthodoxy in the Philippines
- Protestantism in the Philippines
- Religion in the Philippines
- Iglesia ni Cristo
- Jesus Is Lord Church Worldwide
- Jesus Miracle Crusade
- Members Church of God International
- Philippine Independent Church
- Philippine Orthodox Church
- Apostolic Catholic Church (Philippines)
