= Union Theological Seminary (Philippines) =

Protestant seminary in the Philippines

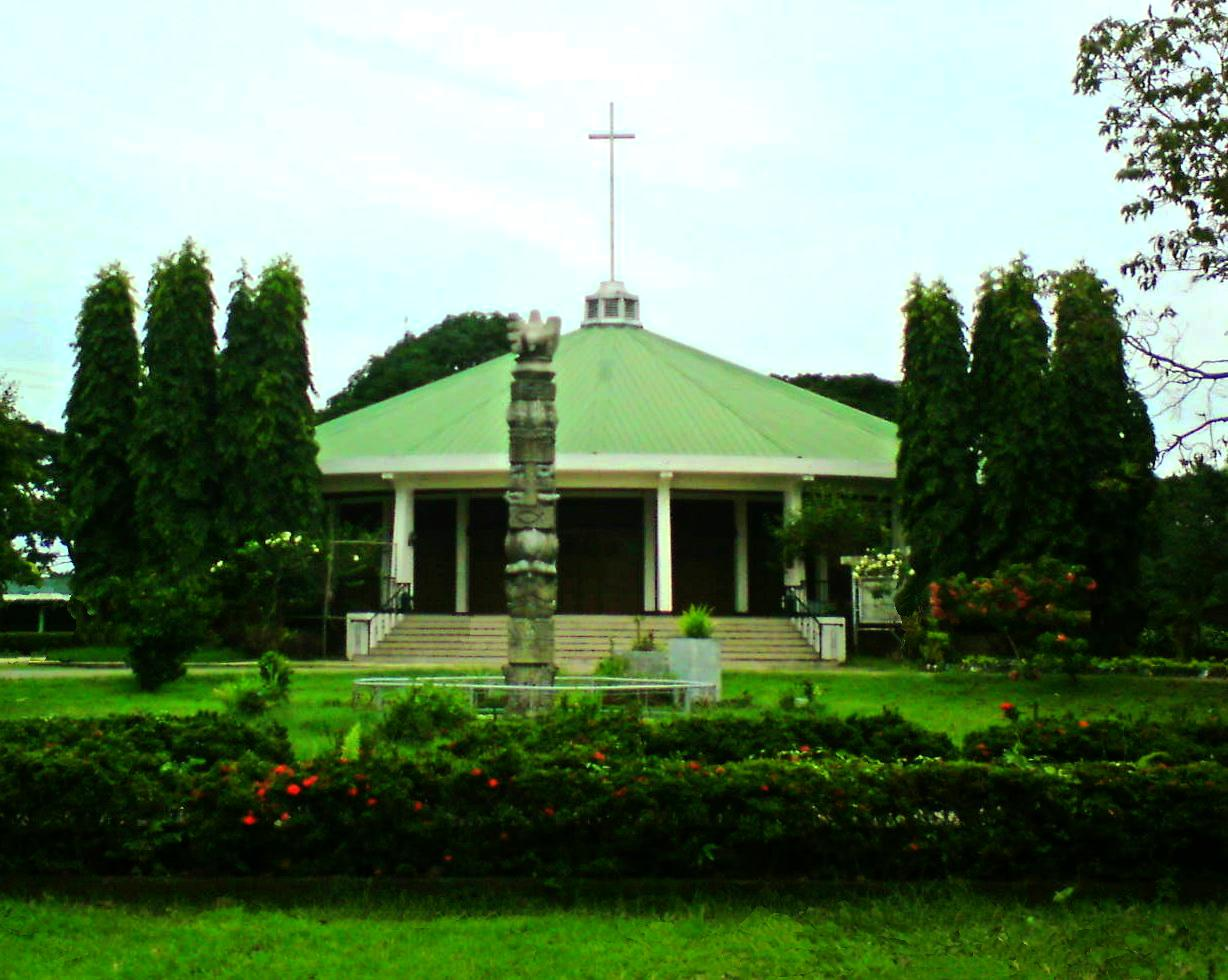
- The Salakot Chapel, Union Theological Seminary
- Motto: Preach the Word
- Type: Private, Theological, Ecumenical
- Established: June 1907
- Affiliations: Philippine Christian University, ATESEA, WCC
- Religious affiliation: Mainline Protestant, Wesleyan
- President: Francisco J. Hernando
- Faculty: 19
- Administrative staff: 23
- Students: 118 (as of March 2012)
- Location: Dasmariñas, Cavite, Philippines; 14°17′32.9″N 120°57′42.6″E
- Website: uniontheologicalseminary-public.sharepoint.com

Union Theological Seminary is the oldest Protestant seminary in the Philippines.

== Overview ==
The seminary was established in 1907 when the Ellinwood Bible Training School (founded by the Presbyterians in 1905) and the Florence B. Nicholson Bible Seminary (established by the Methodists in 1905) merged into one theological institution .

This merger was a significant event for The Comity Agreement, which intended to unify various mainline Protestant denominations established by American missionaries during the American Colonial Era of the Philippines. Though the United Church of Christ in the Philippines and the United Methodist Church in the Philippines collectively support it, the seminary is independent of both in structure and curricular formation.

Since its creation, the seminary has produced pastors and church workers who contributed substantially to Protestantism in the Philippines. Graduates of the seminary went to work for well-established local churches. Its alumni played a vital role in the creation of the United Church of Christ in the Philippines in 1948. Individuals who came from UTS took part in the formation of the Association of Theological Education in Southeast Asia in 1957 and the National Council of Churches in the Philippines in 1963.

== History ==
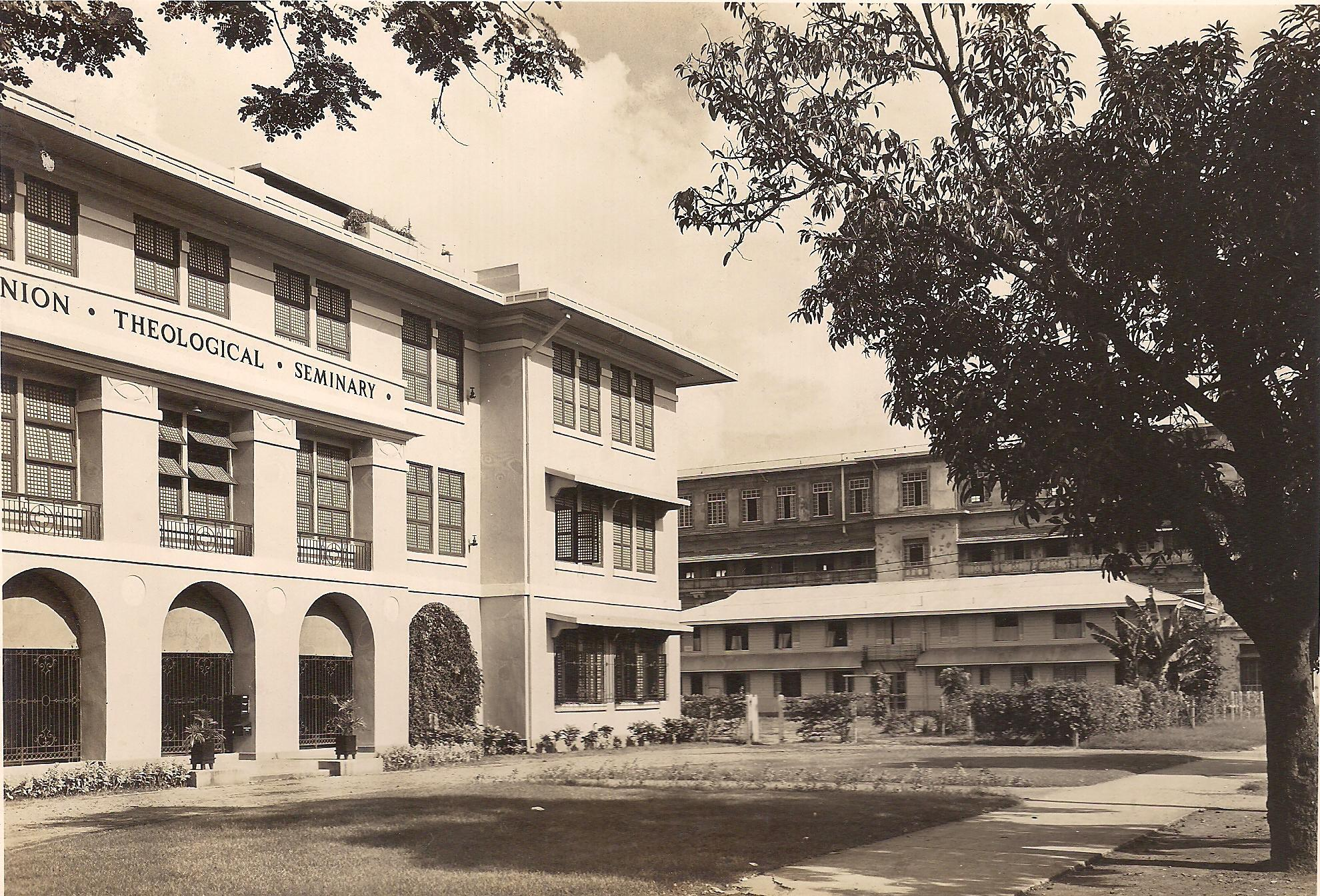
The Union Theological Seminary building in Manila circa 1940 (being used now by the Philippine Christian University).

When various Protestant denominations from America came to the Philippines in the early 1900s, the missionaries started teaching Filipinos about the Bible and basic doctrines of Christianity. These trained clergy played, and continue to play, an active role in the spread of Protestant influence throughout the islands. Bible study courses were conducted in churches and homes until Protestant churches formed their own theological institutions. On August 25, 1903, the Manila Bible Institute was initiated and has become an annual event to train church workers within a course of one month. Numerous pastors from Manila and Dagupan attended the training. Since then, various Bible schools were established and theological education among Protestants in the Philippines has become more institutionalized not only in Manila, but in other provinces as well.

=== Ellinwood Bible School ===
With the help of James B. Rodgers and other missionaries, the Presbyterian Mission established churches in Manila and nearby provinces. One of the most prominent churches is the Ellinwood Malate Church, which was named after Francis F. Ellinwood, the Secretary General of the Presbyterian Mission Board during that time. Rodgers had envisioned a school in Manila and after a few years, the church founded Ellinwood Bible School in 1905. The school taught basic instruction on the Bible, preaching, health, and good manners. The Bible school had separate classes for boys and girls. The buildings of the Bible school were erected in 1906: one for young men and one for young women. Dormitories were also built as part of the expansion under the direction of George W. Wright.

=== Florence B. Nicholson Seminary ===
The Methodist Episcopal Mission instituted the Florence B. Nicholson Bible Seminary on October 11, 1905, in Manila. The president of the seminary was Harry Farmer. In 1906, another seminary was established in Dagupan, Pangasinan. The following year, the classes in Dagupan were transferred to Manila after the church acquired a property in Caloocan (then part of Rizal). Students from the provinces transferred and continued their studies in Manila. On December 4, 1908, the first cohort of students graduated from a three-year course.

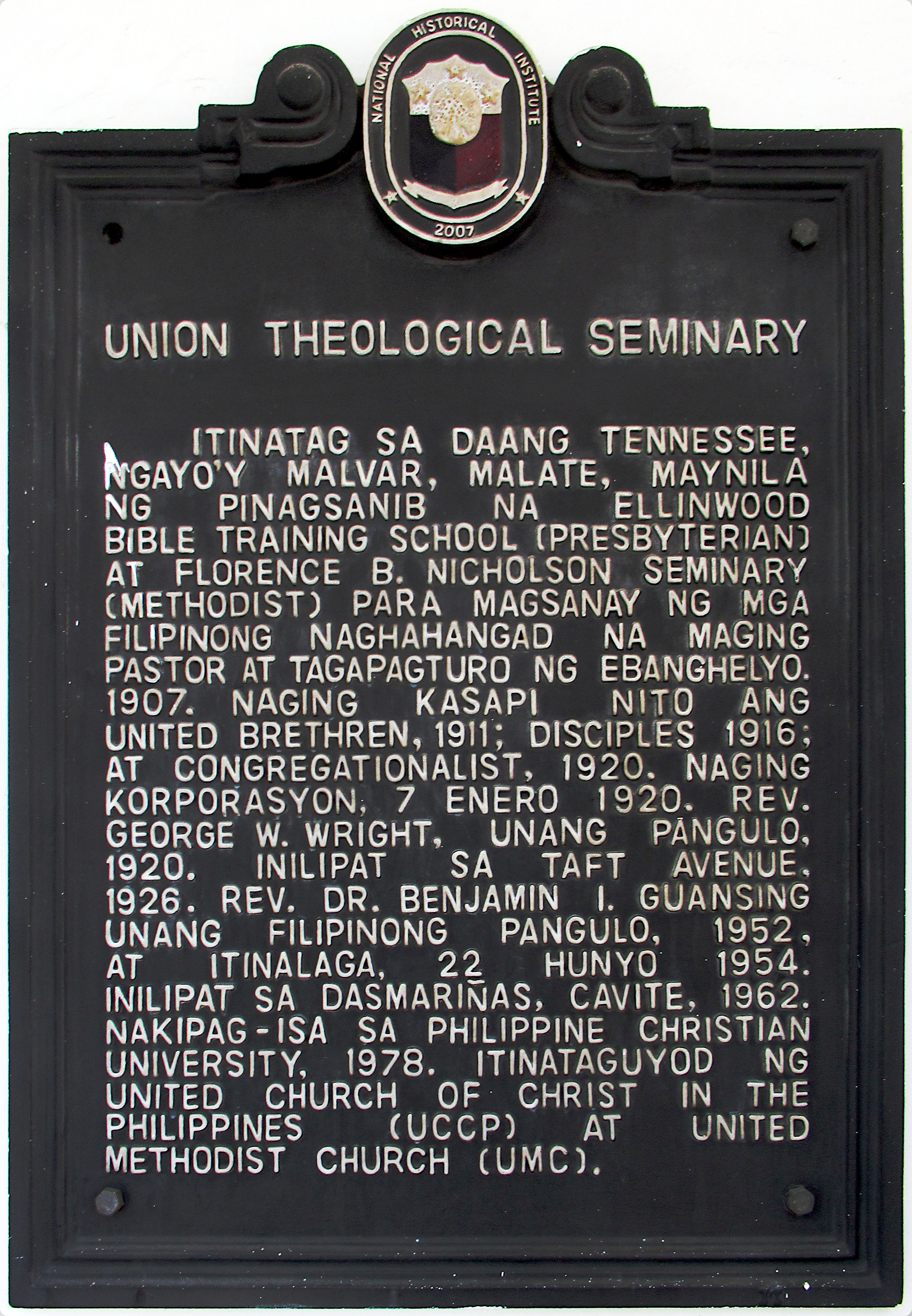
One of the two markers unveiled by the National Historical Institute for UTS

=== The Union ===
With the shared vision of uniting various Protestant traditions, the Presbyterian and the Methodist Missions combined efforts to hold Bible classes for workers in 1905. Under the direction of Wright and Farmer, the sessions were successful and became a regular event in the community. In early 1907, the leadership of the Ellinwood Bible School and the Florence Nicholson Seminary discussed the possible establishment of a united theological institution that would jointly train church workers from these two Protestant traditions.

Presidents of
Union Theological Seminary
ELLINWOOD BIBLE SCHOOL - UNION BIBLE SEMINARY
George W. Wright, 1905-1907
James B. Rodgers, 1907-1908
Theresa M. Kalb, 1908-1910
Edward Campbell, 1910-1912
Charles Gunn, 1912-1913
FLORENCE B. NICHOLSON - UNION BIBLE SEMINARY
Harry Farmer, 1905–1909, 1910-1915
Marvin A. Rader, 1909
Ernest A. Rayner, 1910
Ernest S. Lyons, 1915-1918
UNION THEOLOGICAL SEMINARY
George W. Wright, 1919–1921, 1921-1924
James B. Rodgers, 1924-1925
Archie L. Ryan, 1925-1932
Charles R. Hamilton, 1932–1934, 1934-1941
Don Holter, 1941
Albert J. Sanders, 1947-1952
Benjamin I. Guansing, 1952–1954, 1954-1966
Jacob S. Quiambao, 1966-1971
Emerito P. Nacpil, 1971-1975
Levi V. Oracion, 1975-1985
Meynardo R. Jose, 1983-1990
Mariano C. Apilado, 1990-2003
Anselmo D. Lupdag, 2003-2004
Romeo L. Del Rosario, 2005-2008
Ferdinand A. Anno, 2008-2011
Everett L. Mendoza, 2011-2012
Wilfredo H. Tangunan, 2012-2013
Eleazar S. Fernandez, 2013–present

Following a conference held by the two churches, the Union Bible Seminary was formed. The first classes of this joint theological seminary began in June 1907 in the Ellinwood building in Malate. In following years, classes were also held in Caloocan. The division of the classes into two different locations was found to be inconvenient, resulting in the decision to hold the sessions in the Ellinwood buildings and the Central Methodist Church. The union was based on mutual co-operation and led to a general sharing of everything from the faculty to the properties. The United Brethren joined the seminary in 1911, the Disciples of Christ in 1916, and the Congregationalists in 1919.

In 1920, Union Theological Seminary was adopted as the official name of the institution. In 1921, the corporation was formed having its own Constitution and By-Laws. The newly incorporated seminary did not have facilities of its own until a new building was erected at the corner of Taft Avenue and Herran Street (now Pedro Gil). This was dedicated in 1926. During World War II, the seminary temporarily suspended classes and resumed after the war had ended. In the bombing of Manila in 1945, the city was severely devastated. Many of the historic buildings and landmarks were ruined, but UTS building remained intact and still stands today. The seminary stood on Taft Avenue in Manila from 1926 to 1962.

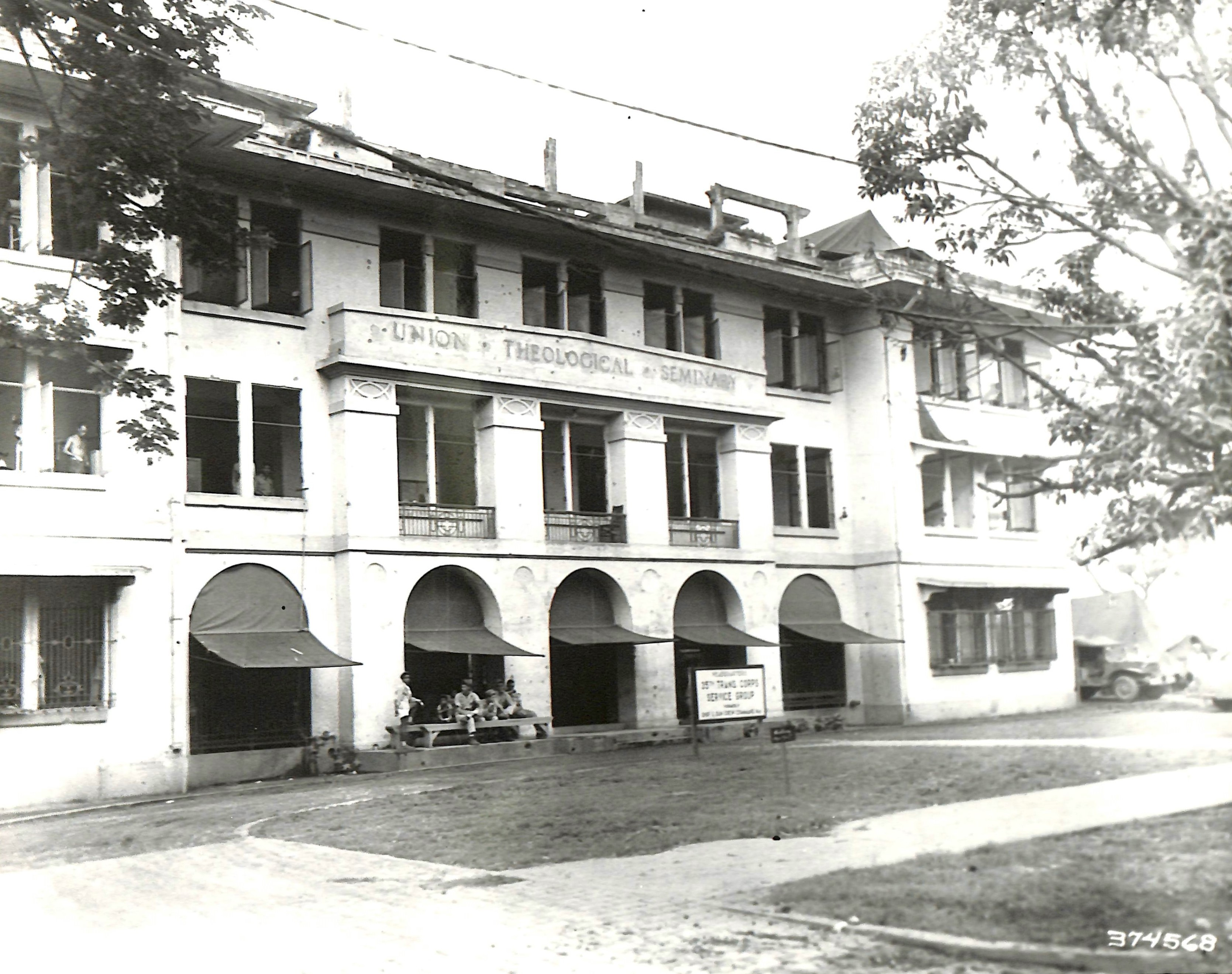
Union Theological Seminary in July 1945 after the Battle of Manila.

During the special meeting of the Board of Trustees on June 2, 1961, held in Baguio, it was approved that the seminary be assigned to a new location. The Board of Founders of the Nanking Theological Seminary provided the funds needed to buy a property. After considering buying the 5-hectare property at the University of the Philippines in Diliman, the Trustees purchased a 97-hectare property in Dasmariñas, Cavite, Manila. In June 1962, the seminary moved to Dasmariñas, Cavite. Housing projects for the faculty were also initiated. The seminary continues to stand in this spot today.

The seminary has been involved in various movements for the protection of human rights. Upon the request of the bishops of the UCCP and United Methodist Church in the Philippines in early 2001, the institution accepted and granted shelter to several families of Mangyans from Mindoro who had left their homes due to growing military operations in their localities. The seminary has proclaimed its vicinity as a kanlungan ("refuge" in Filipino) and served as a sanctuary to the victims of forced displacement and oppression.

== Education ==
A Union High School was established in Manila by the Evangelical Union in 1919. Later on, the Union Christian College in San Fernando, La Union, was founded in 1936 with elementary and college departments. The seminary began offering college courses in Manila, which eventually led to the birth of Manila Union University in 1947. This institution became the Philippine Christian College. The schools were created to serve the educational needs of pastors, their families, and the surrounding communities.

For many years, the seminary and the colleges existed independently and co-operatively under separate boards. Most of the facilities in Manila had been shared with the Philippine Christian College until the seminary moved to Dasmariñas, Cavite. Since then, the seminary has occupied a small portion of the building along Taft Avenue, mainly for administrative and academic functions for post-graduate studies.

The Philippine Christian College attained its university status in 1976. The College of Agriculture was then offered in its Dasmariñas, where the Union Theological Seminary was situated. In 1978, Union Theological Seminary merged with Philippine Christian University to create the Philippine Christian Center of Learning.

== Theological Formation ==
=== The Critical Asian Principle ===
Since 1972, the Union Theological Seminary, in partnership with member seminaries and divinity schools of the ATESEA, has adopted the Critical Asian Principle as the basis for implementing the operation of various theological programs of the member schools.

The CAP celebrates and emphasizes the Asian experience as theological education's situational, hermeneutical, missiological and pedagogical principle. These four key principles were conceptualized to empower Asian churches to develop theologies of their own that are fully liberated from the culturally extraneous framework and evolve values that privilege Asian thought, reflection, and action in their actual theologies.

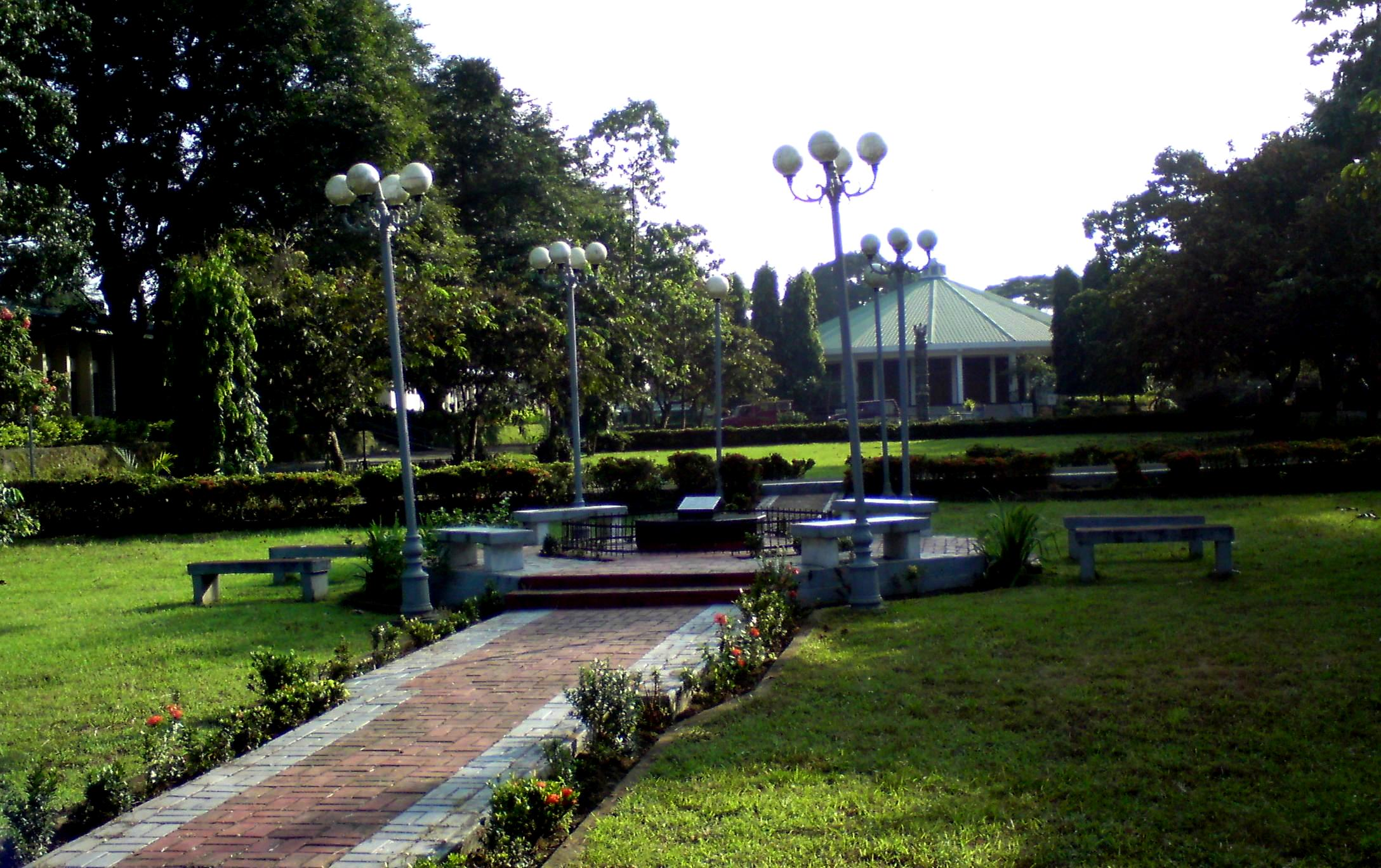
The Guansing Memorial, a prominent spot at the heart of the UTS grounds.

CAP includes the following concerns:

- Religious Fundamentalisms
- Gender Justice
- Ecological Problems, Disease and Disasters
- Globalization and Global Empire Building
- Colonization
- Spirituality
- Identity and Power Struggle
- Peoples Movements and Ecumenism
- Information Technology - Change and Challenges
- Social Challenges, Indigenous Identity and Minority Rights

=== The Centennial Curriculum ===
Considering recommendations from the World Alliance of Reformed Churches and adopting the Revised CAP, the seminary has devised the Centennial Curriculum, in order to make the education contextual, holistic and responsive to the challenges and experiences of the Filipino people and become more relevant to Filipino life. The primary language used in the instruction is Filipino, but English is alternatively used to facilitate communication with international students.

== Degrees ==
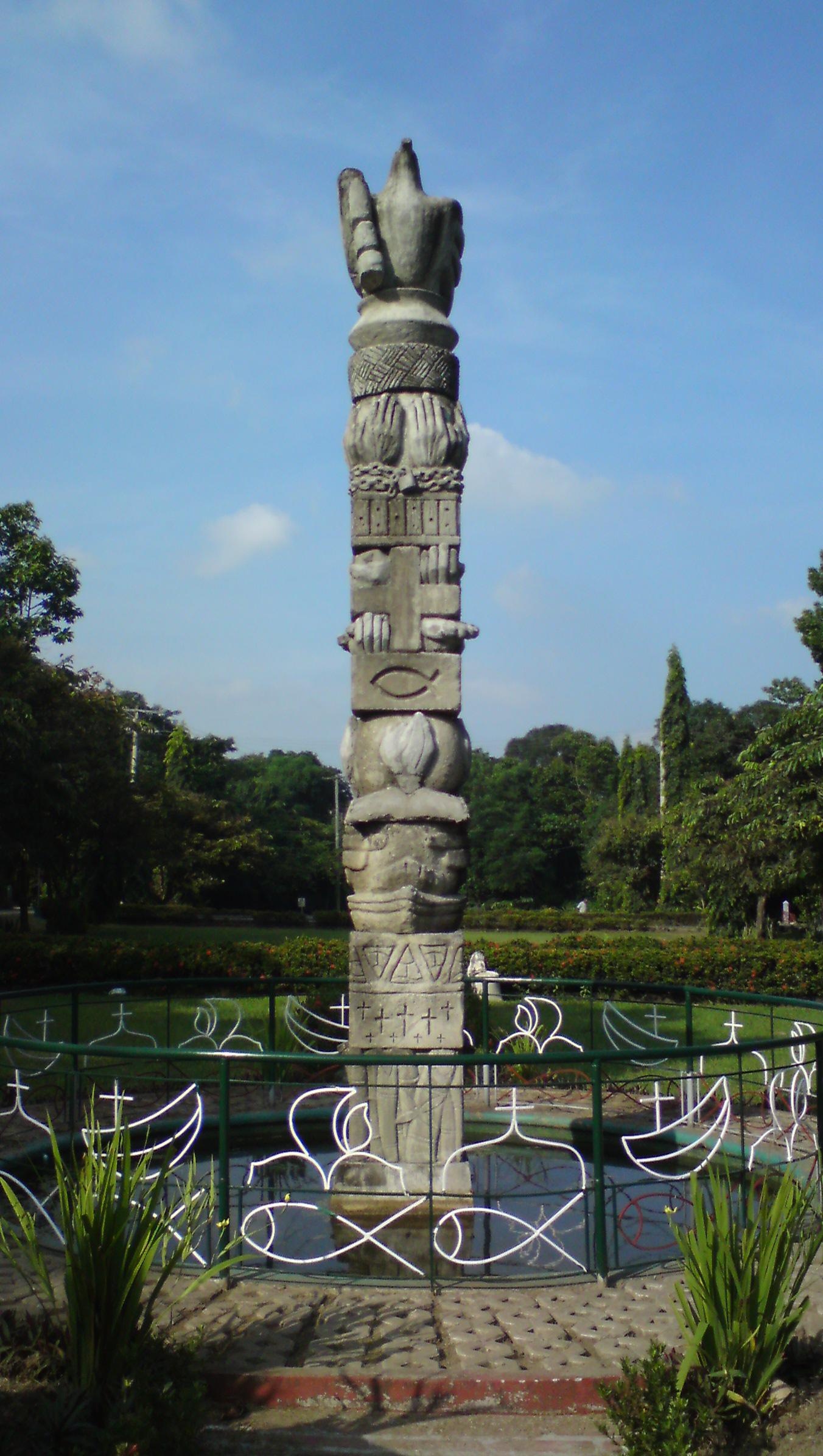
The Totem, a monument celebrating the life of Union Theological Seminary

UTS confers several types of programs:

(1) residential program: both graduate (M.Div.) and undergraduate (B.Th.);

(2) Theological education by extension: Master of Ministry (M. Min.) and Bachelor of Ministry (B. Min.) and Doctorate in ministry (D. Min.);and,

(3) graduate programs: M. Theol. and D. Theol. (in co-operation with the ATESEA Theological Union).

There are eight centers for theological studies:

- Ecumenics, Justice, and Peace
- Wesleyan Studies
- Arts, Liturgy, and Music
- Pastoral Care
- Spiritual Formation
- Woman, Youth, and Children
- Gender and Sexuality
- Geocentric Applied Theology

== Notable alumni ==
Among the best people who have attended Union Theological Seminary are the following:

- Dionisio D. Alejandro (1893-1972), (B.D. 1922) first Filipino bishop of the United Methodist Church (elected in 1944)Cecilia lorenzana
- Benjamin I. Guansing, (1908-1968), first Filipino president of UTS (1952-1966), one of the founders and first Chairperson of ATESEA, bishop of UMC (elected in 1967)
- Cirilo A. Rigos (B.Th.,1955), former General Secretary of UCCP (1968-1972), appointed as delegate to the Philippine Constitutional Commission, former President of the Philippine Bible Society, former Executive Secretary of UBS, ordained minister of UCCP
- La Verne D. Mercado (B.Th.,1952), hailed as one of the heroes of the struggle against dictatorship in the Philippines, former General Secretary of NCCP (1974-1987), bishop of UMC (elected in 1976)
- Feliciano V. Cariño, former General Secretary of WSCF, former General Secretary of CCA (1995-2000), former General Secretary of NCCP (1988-1995), organizing secretary and former Chairperson of Student Christian Movement of the Philippines
- Emerito P. Nacpil, President of UTS (1971-1975), former executive director of ATESEA, served in Central Committee of WCC, bishop of UMC (elected in 1980)
- Daniel C. Arichea Jr. (B.Th.,1957), translation consultant UBS, former President of Philippine Bible Society, former Chairperson of NCCP, bishop of UMC (elected in 1994)
- Cipriano S. Navarro, bishop of UCCP (elected 1948), one of the founding leaders of the UCCP and Philippine Methodist Church
- Leonardo G. Dia, bishop of UCCP (elected 1948), one of the founding leaders of the UCCP
- Proculo A. Rodriguez, bishop of UCCP (elected 1948), one of the founding leaders of the UCCP
- Ciriaco Ma. Lagunzad, former General Secretary of NCCP (1972-1973)
- Marciano C. Evangelista, bishop of UCCP (elected 1960)
- Eligio B.A. Hernandez, bishop of UCCP (elected 1972)
- Eduardo B. Panganiban, bishop of UCCP (elected 1974)
- Estanislao Q. Abainza, (A.Th.,1949; B.Th.,1952; BD,1959) former General Secretary of UCCP (1972-1976), bishop of UCCP
- Erme R. Camba, (honoris causa in 2014) former General Secretary of UCCP (1986-1994), bishop of UCCP
- Hilario M. Gomez Jr., former General Secretary of UCCP (1994-1998), bishop of UCCP
- Elmer M. Bolocon, (B.Th.1974) former General Secretary of UCCP (1998-2006), bishop of UCCP (elected in 1998)
- Eliezer M. Pascua, former General Secretary of UCCP (2006-2010), bishop of UCCP (elected in 1990)
- Cornelio M. Ferrer, bishop of UMC (elected in 1968)
- Paul Locke A. Granadosin, bishop of UMC (elected in 1968)
- Juan A. Marigza, (B.Th.,1957) bishop of UCCP (elected in 1986)
- Gabriel A. Garol, bishop of UCCP (elected in 1994)
- Nelinda Primavera - Briones, first woman bishop in the Philippines / UCCP (elected in 1998)
- Benjamin A. Justo, (BD,1968) bishop of UMC (elected in 2000)
- Leo A. Soriano, (BD, 1980) bishop of UMC (elected in 2000)
- Solito K. Toquero, (BD,1973) bishop of UMC (elected in 2001)
- Jose D. Dalino (D.Min 1992) bishop of CAMACOP (elected 2001 & 2013)
- Benjamin G. Barloso, (BD, 1981) bishop of UCCP (elected 2002)
- Dulce Pia Rose, second woman bishop in the Philippines / UCCP (elected in 2006)
- Jesse S. Suarez, bishop of UCCP (elected in 2006)
- Rodolfo A. Juan, bishop of UMC (elected in 2008)
- Lito C. Tangonan, presiding bishop and founder of Ang Iglesia Metodista sa Pilipinas (2012), former bishop of UMC (elected in 2008)
- Arturo R. Asi, (B.Th.,1979) bishop of UCCP (elected in 2010)
- Roel P. Mendoza, bishop of UCCP (elected in 2010)
- Jaime R. Moriles, bishop of UCCP (elected in 2010)
- Pedro E. Torio Jr., bishop of UMC (elected in 2012)
- Ciriaco Q. Francisco, bishop of UMC (elected in 2012)
- Emergencio D. Padillo, bishop of UCCP (elected in 2014)
- Joel E. Tendero, bishop of UCCP (elected in 2014)Cecilia lorenzana

== See also ==
- UCCP Seminaries and Affiliated Institutions
- Association for Theological Education in Southeast Asia
- Southeast Asia Graduate School of Theology
- Philippine Christian University
- Protestantism in the Philippines
