= Myanmar Theological College, Mandalay =

Christian Seminary in Mandalay, Myanmar

Coordinates: 21°58′41.2″N 96°06′03.9″E

Myanmar Theological College is a Christian seminary in Mandalay, Myanmar.

== Brief history ==
Historically, Myanmar Theological College (MTC) has undergone three stages of development. In 1937 (88 years ago), it was the Bible School. After one decade, in 1947 (78 years ago), the Bible School was promoted to a Theological Training Institution. Again, after four decades, in 1987 (38 years ago), the Theological Training Institution was promoted to become the Myanmar Theological College. The first Principal was Rev. Dennis Reed, who came from England as a Methodist Missionary.

== General information ==
Myanmar Theological College is one of an ATEM (Association for Theological Education in Myanmar) member, and accredited by ATESEA (Association for Theological Education in South East Asia). The Bachelor of Theology (B.Th.) programme was re-accredited and the Master of Divinity (M.Div.) programme of the Myanmar Theological College was also accredited by the ATESEA in 2011. The college also offers Master of Arts in Christian Studies (MACS).

== Programs ==
- M.Div (Master of Divinity)
- B.Th (Bachelor of Theology)
- L.Th (Licentiate of Theology)
- M.T (Ministerial Training)
- MACS (Master of Arts in Christian Studies)
- B.Min (Bachelor of Ministry)
- International Academic English

== Current principal ==
Rev. Van Hong M.Th

== Accreditation ==
Myanmar Theological College is accredited by the Association for Theological Education in South East Asia (ATESEA).

== Place ==
Myanmar Theological College is located in Mandalay, Chanayethazan Township, Corner Street of 70x28.
