= University Church, Central Philippine University =

Church on the campus of Central Philippine University

Central Philippine University Church
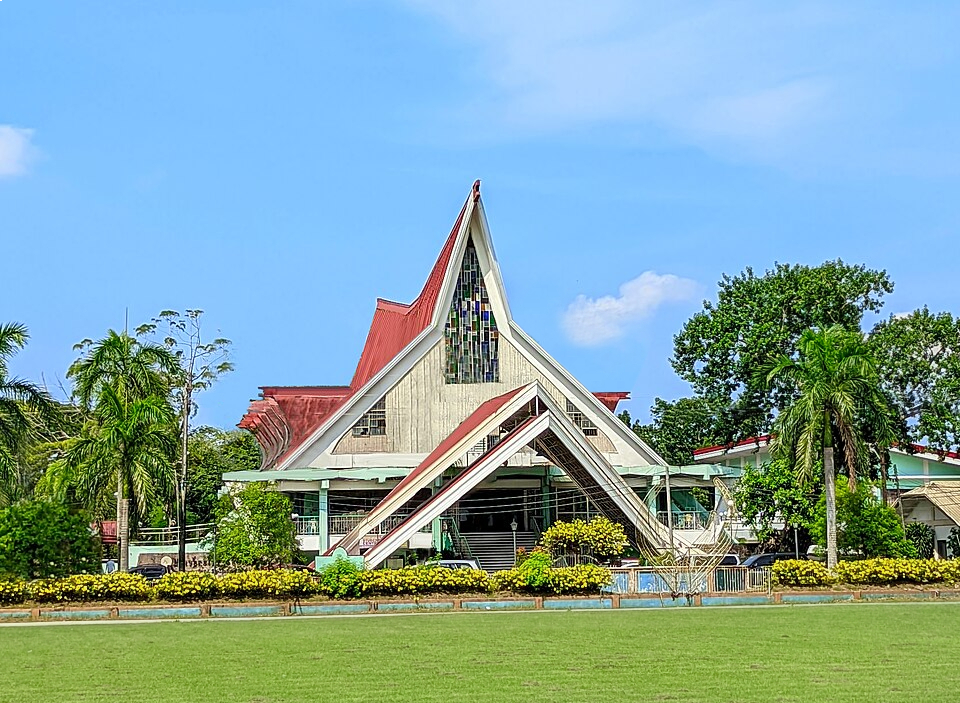
- The Central Philippine University Church

Religion
- Affiliation: Mainline Protestant (in covenant with the Convention of Philippine Baptist Churches)
- Ecclesiastical or organizational status: Congregation
- Leadership: Engr. Jeriel G. Militar, Church Moderator; Rev. Cris Amorsolo V. Sian, Senior Pastor and Church Administrator

Location
- Location: Church Road, Central Philippine University, Lopez Jaena Street, Jaro, Iloilo City, Philippines
- Interactive map of Central Philippine University Church
- Coordinates: 10°43′49″N 122°32′56″E

Architecture
- Style: Rumah Melayu (Malay Architecture) and Modern
- Completed: 1970

Specifications
- Direction of façade: South East
- Capacity: ~1000
- Length: 120 feet (37 m)
- Width: 50 feet (15 m)
- Width (nave): 18 feet (5 m)
- Height (max): 75 feet (23 m) (base to cross)
- Materials: cement render

Website
- cpu.edu.ph/cpuchurch

The Central Philippine University Church (officially University Church, Central Philippine University), commonly referred to as University Church, UC or CPU Church, is a Protestant church located in the campus of the Central Philippine University in Jaro District, Iloilo City, Philippines. Founded in 1913 by the missionaries under the auspices of the American Baptist Foreign Mission Society, the present church structure was built and completed in 1970s under the chaplaincy of Rev. Kenneth Losh, an American Baptist missionary.

The church which stands as the central and dominant feature of the university's main campus, is notable for its Malay architectural design, and is a famous landmark in Iloilo City.

A distinct unit of the university, CPU Church is independent from it and is a member of the Convention of Philippine Baptist Churches (CPBC), the oldest Baptist churches union in the Philippines. It also maintain ties with the American Baptist Churches USA.

CPU Church is associated with the CPU College of Theology and the Jaro Evangelical Church, the first Baptist church in the Philippines.

The church seats almost 1,000 people. A denominational church, it hosts Sunday and mid-week Congregational Christian Protestant services. It functions also as a venue for several special events and convocations such as baccalaureate services, academic hooding and health sciences ceremonies (nursing candle lighting, pinning and capping), and commencement exercises of the university's colleges and schools of graduate studies, law, and medicine.

== Gallery ==
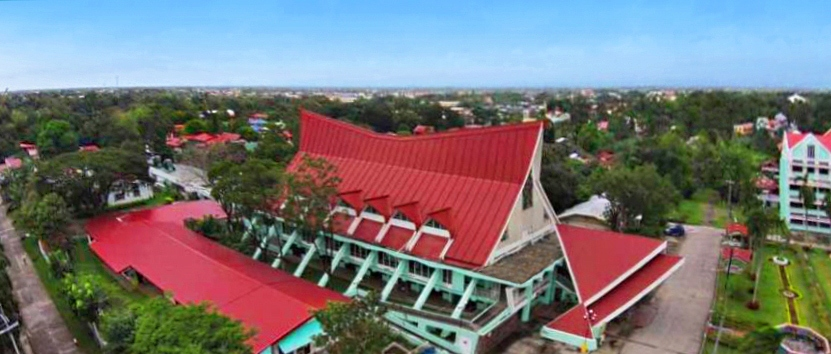
Church's aerial view.

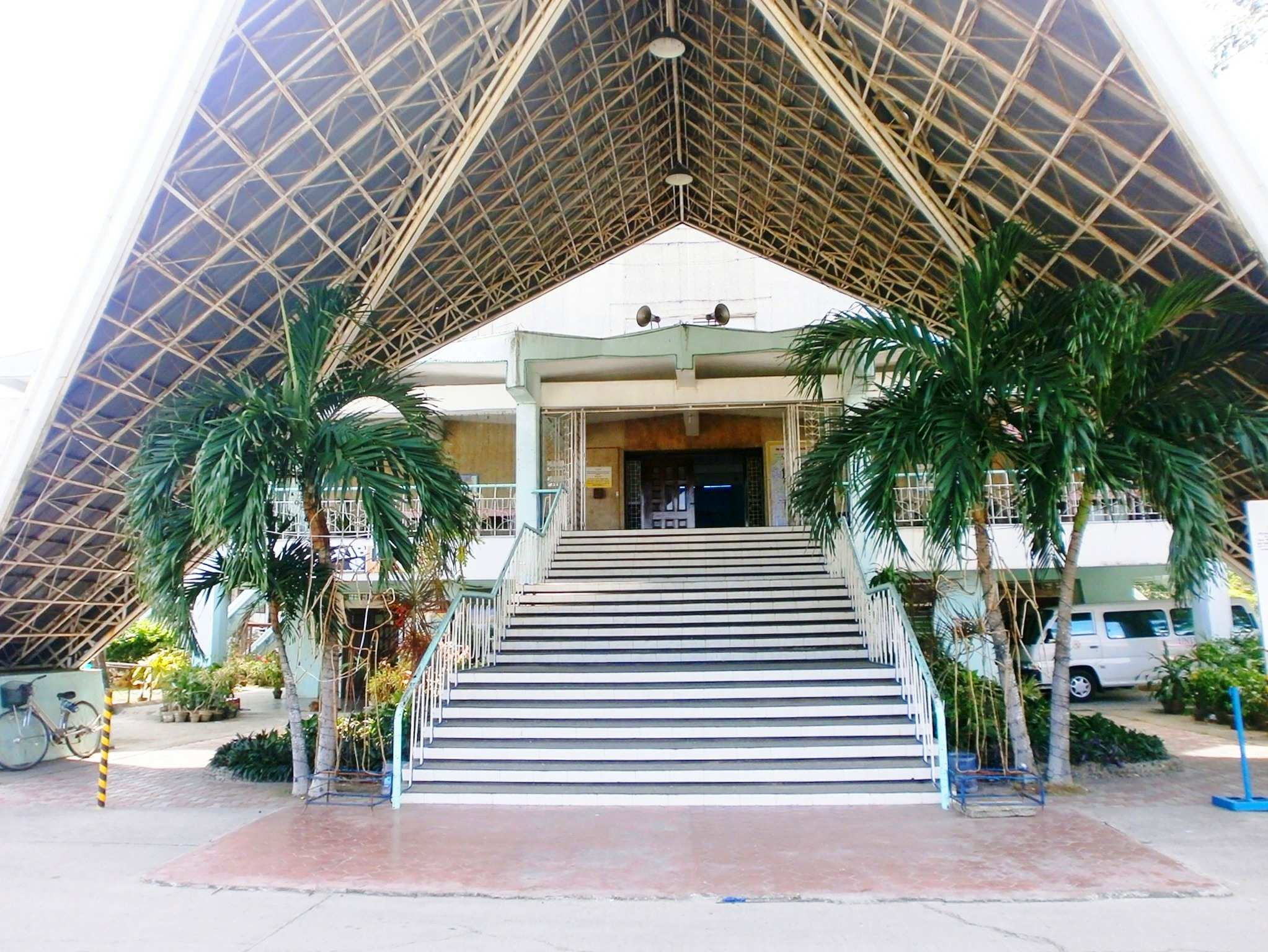
Covered Canopy of the church.

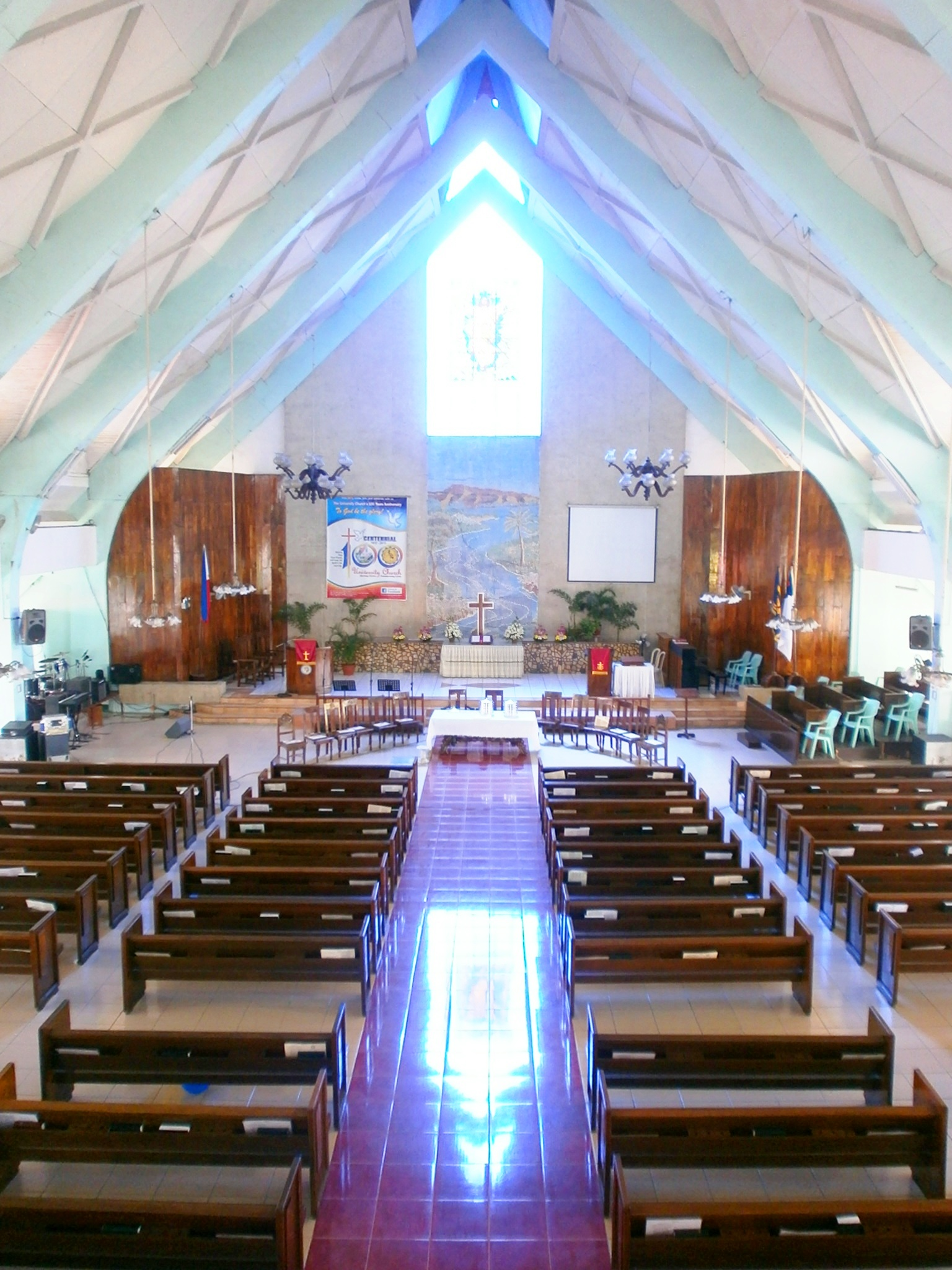
Worship hall viewed from the 3rd floor.

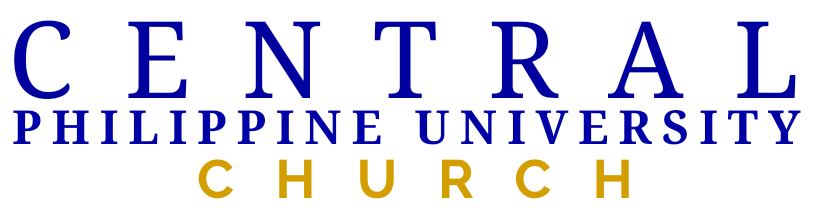
University Church, Central Philippine University (Central Philippine University Church) Banner.
