= Asia Graduate School of Theology =

Evangelical theological seminary consortium

The Asia Graduate School of Theology (AGST) is a consortium of evangelical theological seminaries. It was established by Asia Theological Association in 1984, and consists of three bodies: AGST Japan, AGST Philippines, and AGST Alliance (Cambodia, Malaysia, Myanmar, Singapore, and Thailand).

AGST's purpose is to enable its member seminaries to offer advanced degrees, especially doctorates, to prepare scholars and leaders for the Church and society in Asia. AGST was self-consciously modelled on the South East Asia Graduate School of Theology, which is operated by the Association for Theological Education in South East Asia.

Bong Rin Ro notes that AGST was formed to stop the "brain drain" of Asian Christian workers to the West: "The Asian Church had depended on western seminaries and churches too long, and the time had come for us to be independent from the West in theological education; otherwise, we would not be able to grow ourselves." He goes on to note that one of AGST's objectives was to "encourage cultural adaptation of theological education. Asian students needed to study theological training within their cultural contexts of poverty, suffering, injustice, non-Christian religions, and communism."

AGST's original plan was to have a consortium in Korea, but as Bong Rin Ro notes, "the AGST in Korea did not succeed due to the lack of cooperation among the evangelical seminaries in Korea."

== AGST Japan ==
AGST Japan has five member institutions.

=== Member institutions ===
- Tokyo Christian University
- Tokyo Biblical Seminary
- Kobe Lutheran Seminary
- Osaka Christian College and Seminary
- Immanuel Bible College

== AGST Philippines ==
AGST Philippines
- Dean: Romerlito C. Macalinao
- Website: agstphil.org

AGST Philippines is recognised by the Commission on Higher Education in the Philippines. It publishes its own journal, the Journal of Asian Mission. JAM has been used as a "venue through which to explore the socio-missiological implications of Flilipino Pentecostalism."

=== Member institutions ===
- Asia-Pacific Nazarene Theological Seminary
- Asia Pacific Theological Seminary
- Asian Seminary of Christian Ministries
- Asian Theological Seminary
- Biblical Seminary of the Philippines
- Febias College of Bible
- International Graduate School of Leadership
- PTS College & Advanced Studies

=== Degrees offered ===
AGST Philippines offers the following degrees:

- Doctor of Education in Christian Counseling
- Doctor of Philosophy in Transformational Development
- Doctor of Philosophy in Transformational Learning
- Master of Theology / Doctor of Philosophy in Biblical Studies
- Master of Theology / Doctor of Philosophy in Theological Studies & Church History
- Master of Theology / Doctor of Philosophy in Peace Studies
- Doctor of Philosophy in Holistic Child Development
- Doctor of Missiology / Doctor of Philosophy in Intercultural Studies
- Doctor of Ministry in Peace Studies
- Master of Theology / Doctor of Philosophy in Orality Studies

== AGST Alliance ==
AGST Alliance
- Established: 2004
- Dean: Allan Harkness
- Website: www.agstalliance.org

AGST Alliance was established in 2004 as the AGST (Malaysia/Singapore) consortium.

=== Member institutions ===
==== Malaysia ====
- Bible College of Malaysia
- Malaysia Baptist Theological Seminary
- Malaysia Bible Seminary

==== Myanmar ====
- Myanmar Evangelical Graduate School of Theology

==== Singapore ====
- East Asia School of Theology

==== Thailand ====
- Bangkok Bible Seminary
- Thailand Pentecostal Seminary

Additionally, Chiang Mai Theological Seminary (Thailand), Malaysia Evangelical College (Sarawak), and Phnom Penh Bible School (Cambodia) are associate members.

=== Degrees offered ===
AGST Alliance offers the following degrees:

- Master of Theology (Th.M.)
- Master of Theology (Biblical Studies)
- Master of Theology (Education) in Spiritual Formation and Discipleship
- Master of Transformational Development
- Doctor of Philosophy in Education (Ph.D.)
- Doctor of Philosophy in Theology
- Doctor of Philosophy in Biblical Studies
- Doctor of Education in Child & Family Development (Ed.D.)
- Doctor of Ministry in Leadership (D.Min.)
