= Asian Seminary of Christian Ministries =

Theological institution in the Philippines

Coordinates: 14.5586°N 121.0237°E

- Established: 1980
- Religious affiliation: Church of God (Cleveland, Tennessee)
- Location: Makati, Philippines
- Website: ascm.edu.ph

The Asian Seminary of Christian Ministries (ASCM) is an international evangelical and Pentecostal seminary in Makati, Philippines. It is a training institute of the Church of God World Missions, recognized by the Philippine government as a religious higher education institution.

== History ==
The Asian Seminary of Christian Ministries (ASCM) establishment had links to the Church of God Bible Academy (COGBA), established in 1973 by Arthur W. Pettyjohn. A concept of a theological education institution of the Church of God in Asia and Oceania was made by Gerald Holloway, a Church of God missionary to the Philippines who worked with the Church of God in Asia and more particularly with the COGBA. Through Galloway's efforts the Asian School of Christian Ministries (ASCM) was founded in 1980. By then offering typical four year undergraduate theological education programs such as the Bachelor of Theology (B.Th) and Bachelor of Christian Education (B.Ce).

The Church of God World Mission garnered support for the ASCM in the United States, leading to the intervention of the Church of God YWEA, which launched a four-storey building project in Makati in 1981 to permanently house the Asian Seminary of Christian Ministries. Aside from Filipinos, students from Tuvalu, Kiribati, and Fiji, as well as those from India, China, Japan, Taiwan, Hong Kong, Indonesia, Cambodia, Thailand, Myanmar, Nepal, Sri Lanka, Pakistan, and Mongolia were sent to ACSM.

In 1995 the Philippine government through its Department of Education granted permission and recognition to all of ASCM's undergraduate and graduate programs. The same year the Asia Theological Association (ATA) and the Association of Theological Education Institutions in South East Asia (ATESEA) gave accreditation status to ASCM. With the accreditation status ASCM became eligible to offer doctoral level programs. The Master of Social Work program producing government licensed Church workers in the Church was opened in 2010.

== Academic programs ==
The seminary offers Master of Arts (MA), Master of Divinity (M.Div.), Master of Social Work (MSW), and Doctor of Ministry (D.Min.) graduate degrees. Also, Bachelor of Arts in Theology (BA) and Bachelor of Education (Ed.B.).

== Accreditations ==
- Commission on Higher Education
- Association for Theological Education in South East Asia (ATESEA),
- Association of Theological Schools in the United States and Canada (ATS)
- American Theological Library Association (ATLA)
- Board of Theological Education of the Senate of Serampore College (BTESS) in India.
- Asia Theological Association (ATA), Philippine Association of Bible and Theological Schools (PABATS)
- Asia Graduate School of Theology (AGST) consortium.
