= Bong Rin Ro =

Korean-American theologian

Bong Rin Ro is an American theologian and missiologist. He is a founding leader and former executive secretary of the Asia Theological Association as well as former dean of the Asia Graduate School of Theology.

He served as the director of the World Evangelical Alliance Theological Commission from 1990 to 1996.

== Early life and education ==
Ro was born on 1935 in North Pyongan, Korea and grew up during the Korean War. Following the death of his father, Ro lived in extreme poverty with his mother and five siblings. He completed a year studying philosophy at Seoul National University before moving to the United States with only fifty dollars. In 1956, Ro moved to South Carolina only knowing a few words of English. In 1957, Ro spent three months in New York City and was inspired by a Billy Graham crusade to pursue a liberal arts education.

Ro holds degrees from Columbia Bible College (B.A.), Wheaton College (B.A.), Covenant Theological Seminary (B.D.), and Concordia Seminary (S.T.M. and Th.D.).

== Career ==
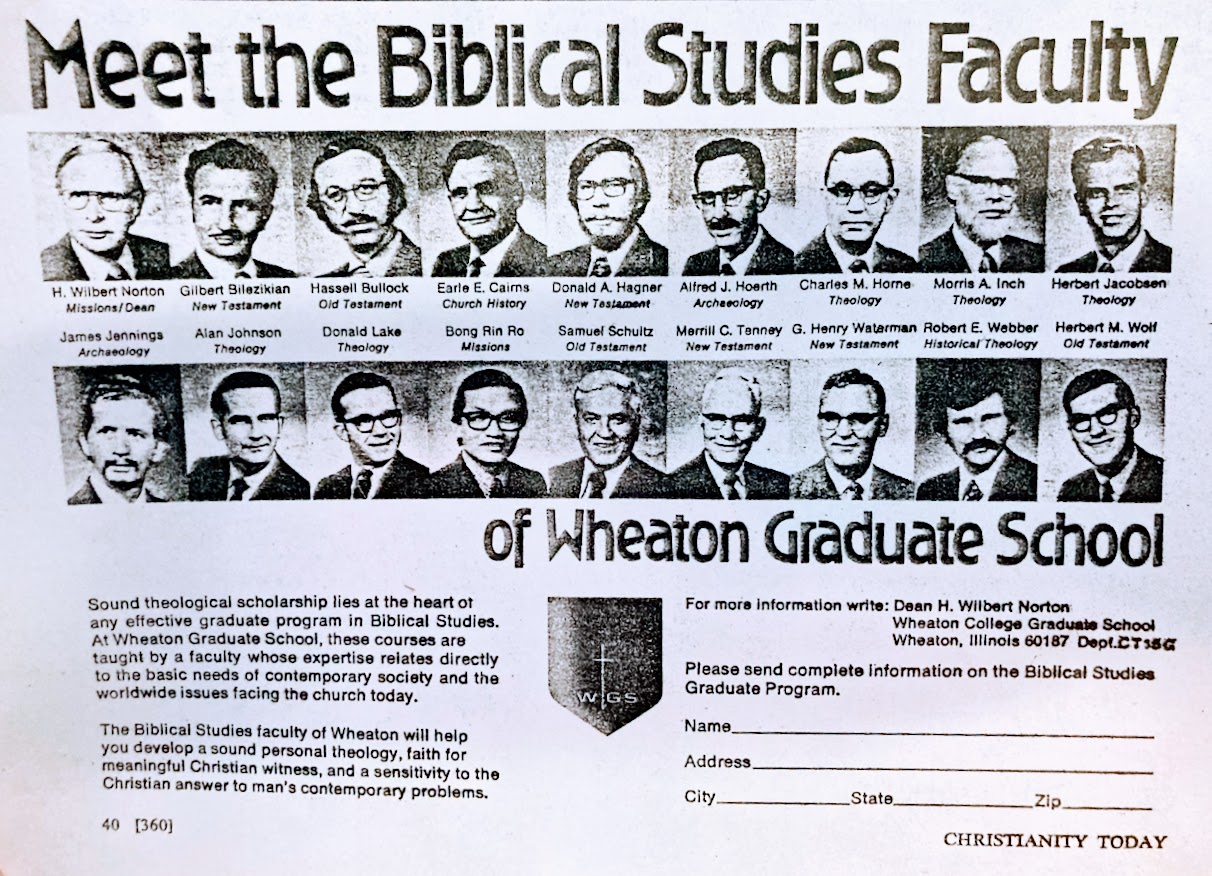
Advertisement by Wheaton College in Christianity Today highlighting Biblical faculty.

Ro served with the Overseas Missionary Fellowship for thirty years and was the first Asian to be sent as a missionary by the organization. As a missionary he lived throughout Asia including Singapore (1970–74), Taiwan (1975–89), and Korea (1990–2000). In his early teaching days, Ro taught at Singapore Bible College. While working in Singapore, Ro was crucial to the founding and development of the Asia Theological Association, serving as executive secretary (1970–1990) and dean of the Asia Graduate School of Theology. He played a significant role in shaping the program and structure of the Asia Theological Association as the organization emerged in helping develop evangelical theological education in Asia. Billy Graham noted how Ro's book Korean Church Growth Explosion "gives insight into the dynamics of the Korean church and suggests ways churches around the world can profit from its example."

Then after moving to Taiwan he taught at Taiwan Seminary and Tunghai University. Ro also went to teach as a professor at Wheaton College.

Ro then served as the academic dean of Torch Trinity Graduate University. Since 2000, Ro has taught at Hawaii Theological Seminary and Pacific Rim Christian University. He is also now the president of Hawaii Theological Seminary and president of the Pacific campus of the Asia Graduate School of Theology.

He was named alumnus of the year by Columbia International University.

Since 1990, Ro has been ordained by the Presbyterian Church in America.

== Selected publications ==
- Ro, Bong R, and Marlin L. Nelson. Korean Church Growth Explosion. Seoul, Korea: Word of Life Press, 1983. Print.
- Ro, Bong R. Christian Alternatives to Ancestor Practices. Taichung, Taiwan, ROC: Asia Theological Association, 1985. Print.
- Ro, Bong R, and Ruth M. Eshenaur. The Bible & Theology in Asian Contexts: An Evangelical Perspective on Asian Theology. Seoul, Korea: Word of Life Press, 1991. Print.
- Gener, Timoteo D, Stephen T. Pardue, and Bong R. Ro. Asian Christian Theology: Evangelical Perspectives., 2019. Print.
- Nicholls, Bruce J, and Bong R. Ro. Beyond Canberra: Evangelical Responses to Contemporary Ecumenical Issues., 1993. Print.
