= Silliman University Divinity School =

Coordinates: 9.317°N 123.306°E

- Type: Private Protestant Presbyterian Seminary
- Established: 1921
- Affiliations: United Church of Christ in the Philippines and ATESEA but independent in governance
- Dean: Dr. Lope B. Robin; Th.B, M.Div, Th.M
- Location: Hibbard Avenue, Dumaguete, Philippines
- Website: www.su.edu.ph

The Silliman University Divinity School, more commonly referred to as the Divinity School, is a private Protestant seminary of Silliman University, a private university in Dumaguete, Philippines. Founded in 1921, the school is affiliated with the United Church of Christ in the Philippines and is accredited with the Association of Theological Education in South East Asia (ATESEA). Additionally, it maintains sisterhood ties with the Baptist seminary, Central Philippine University College of Theology.

== Academic profile ==
=== History ===
The Divinity School opened in 1921 as the Silliman Bible School upon the proposition of Dr. Rank Laubach, a member of the American Board Mission of the Congregational Church in Mindanao. It was envisioned to be a joint Congregationalist-Presbyterian Training School for Visayan-speaking students who are interested in church ministry. As its curriculum was further developed, the Bible School was renamed as the College of Theology in 1935. Still later, and in keeping with the trend among theological schools in other parts of the world, it was further renamed as the Silliman University Divinity School. In 1966, it became one of the participating schools of the South East Asia Graduate School of Theology (SEAGST).

=== Programs ===
As a Protestant seminary, the Divinity School is affiliated with the United Church of Christ in the Philippines, providing various undergraduate and graduate degrees which are accredited with the Association for Theological Education in South East Asia (ATESEA). These degrees are:

- Bachelor of Theology Major in Pastoral Ministry
- Master of Divinity Major in Pastoral Ministry
- Master of Divinity Major in Christian Education
- Master of Divinity Major in Spiritual Care/CPE
- Master of Divinity Major in Systematic Theology
- Master of Divinity Major in Biblical Studies
- Master of Theology Major in Mission Studies
- Doctor of Theology Major in Biblical Studies
- Doctor of Theology Major in Christian Ethics
- Doctor of Theology Major in Systematic Theology

=== Facilities ===
The school is located in a three-building complex inside the Silliman campus, composed of McKinley Hall, Rodriguez Hall, and the Chapel of the Evangel. McKinley Hall houses the Divinity School's classrooms and faculty offices; while the Rodriguez Hall, houses the assembly area, faculty and students lounge, as well as various offices. The Chapel of the Evangel serves as the school's worship center. Also under the school's management is the Divinity Village for its married students, and various dormitories for other Divinity students. The school likewise maintains its own library which has a collection of more than 13,000 books and 120 periodical titles.
