= Central Philippine University – College of Theology =

Theological seminary at Central Philippine University

Central Philippine University College of Theology
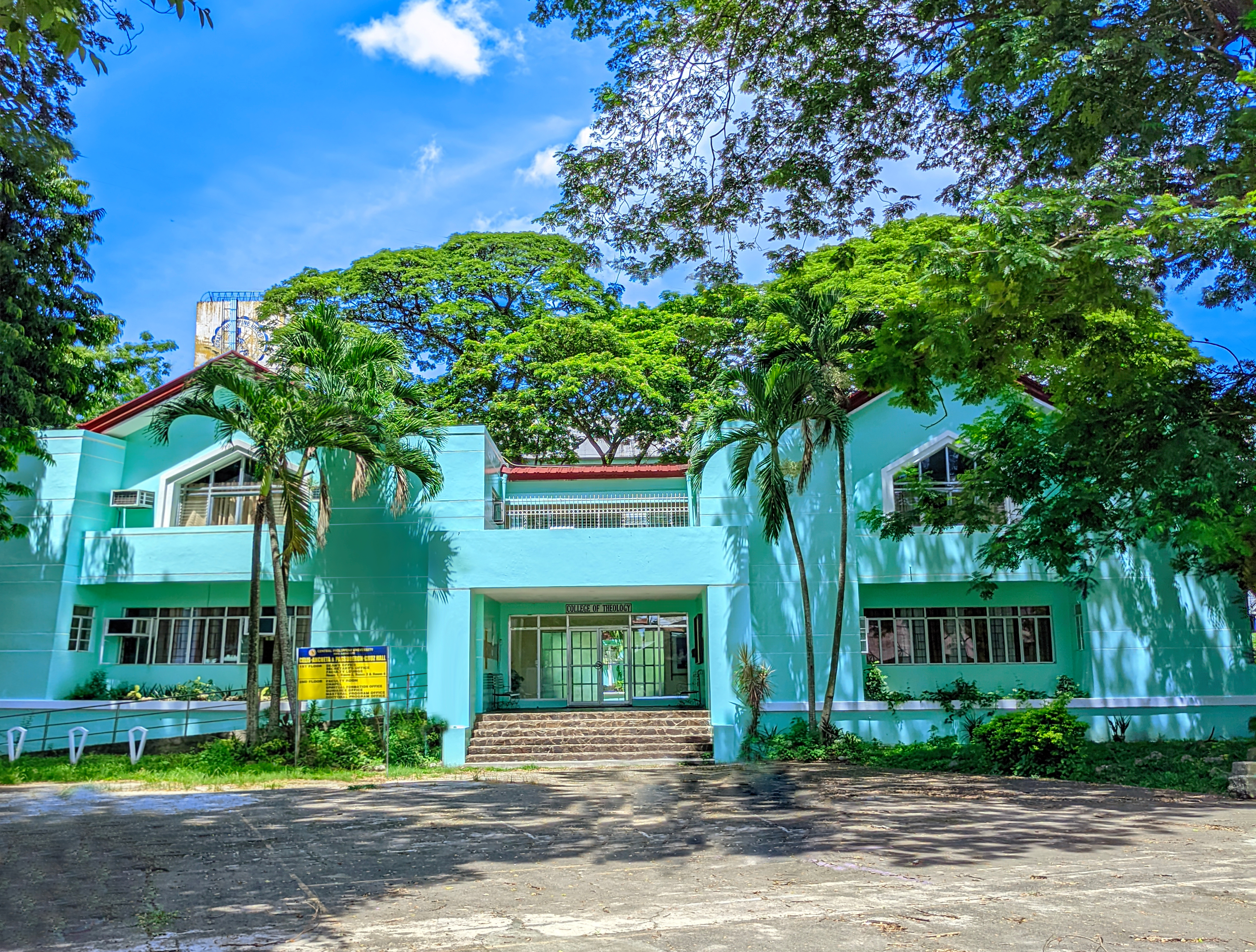
- Celiz-Ancheta and Pasugberon-Cruz Hall of the College of Theology
- Former name: Bible School (June 1905)
- Motto: Scientia et Fides (Latin)
- Motto in English: Knowledge and Faith
- Type: Private Protestant Baptist Seminary
- Established: 1904 as Baptist Missionary Training School (a separate Bible founded by Anna V. Johnson); June 01, 1905 as Bible School
- Affiliations: Central Philippine University
- Religious affiliation: Convention of Philippine Baptist Churches / ATESEA
- President: Rev. Dr. Ernest Howard B. Dagohoy, D.Min., M.Div. (President of Central Philippine University)
- Dean: Bernabe C. Pagara, B.Th., M.Div., M.Th., Th.D
- Location: Jaro, Iloilo City, Iloilo, Philippines; 10°43′49″N 122°32′56″E
- Nickname: CPU COT Ravens
- Website: cpu.edu.ph/college-of-theology
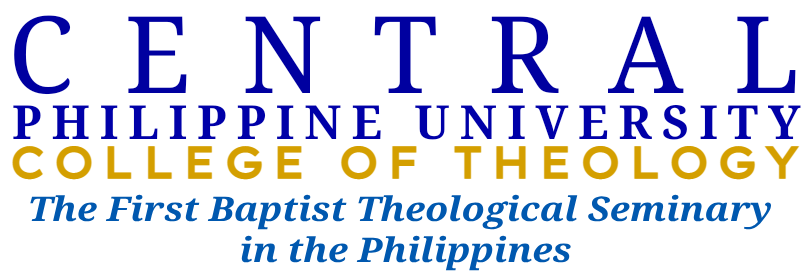

The Central Philippine University College of Theology, also referred to as CPU COT, CPU College of Theology, or CPU Theology, is a private Protestant seminary of Central Philippine University, a private research university in Iloilo City, Philippines. Founded in 1905 as the Bible School for training Christian men, workers, and missionaries through a grant from American industrialist and Northern Baptist John D. Rockefeller, the CPU College of Theology is the oldest college and academic unit of Central Philippine University and "the first Baptist theological seminary (the first Protestant seminary outside Manila) in the Philippines".

The seminary, which originally founded in 1905, merged with the Baptist Missionary Training School (established in 1904) in 1938. When Central Philippine College became a university in 1953, the department was upgraded to Central Philippine University College of Theology.

The CPU College of Theology, which is affiliated and serves as the seminary for the Convention of Philippine Baptist Churches (CPBC), is also accredited with the Association for Theological Education in South East Asia (ATESEA). Additionally, it has a sisterhood ties with the Presbyterian seminary, Silliman University Divinity School.

== History ==
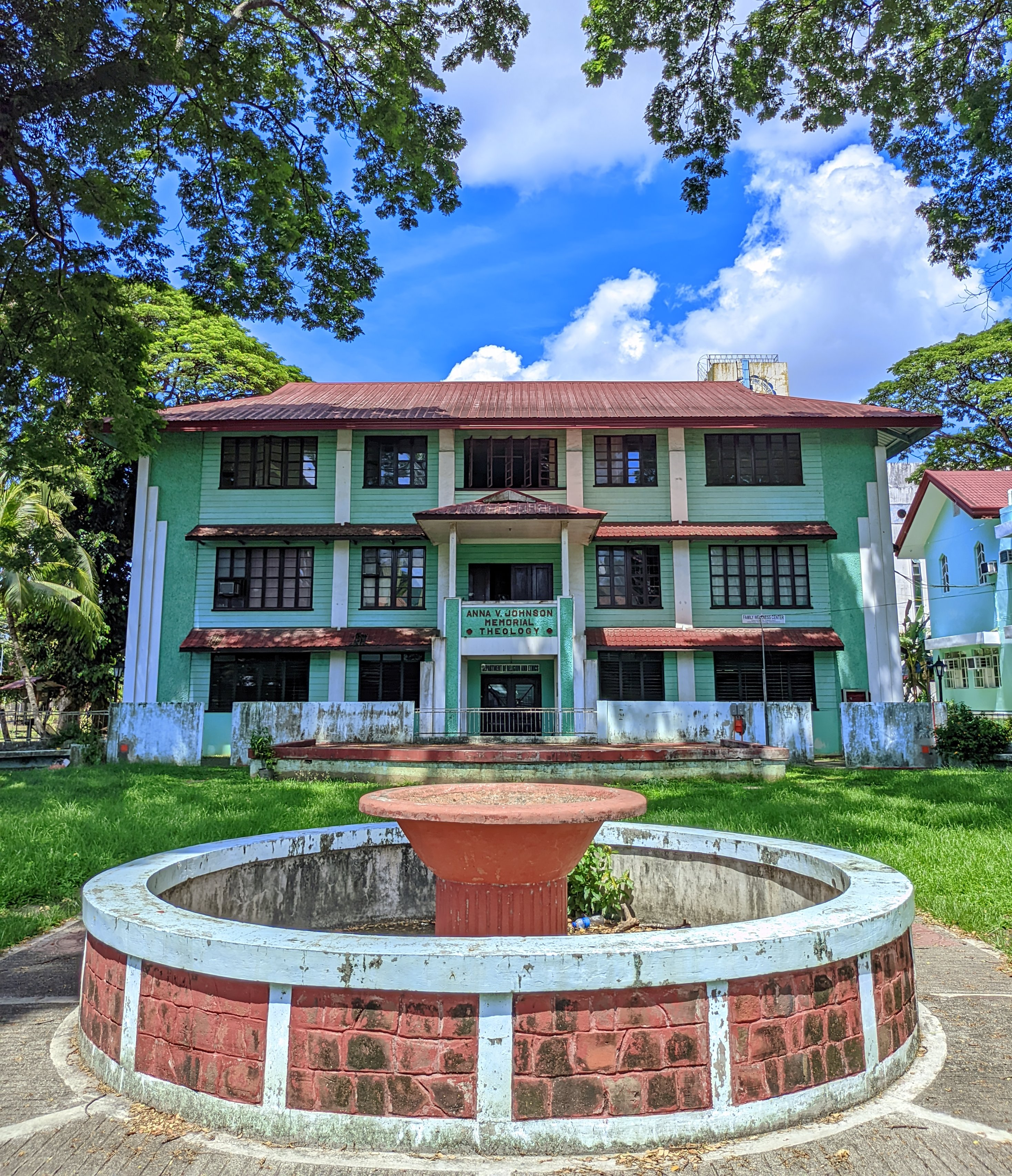
Johnson Hall.

The Reverend William Orison Valentine, the founder of Central and first president.

The Seminary has its origins in a foreign mission of the American Baptist Missionary Union on the island of Panay in February 1900, when the Philippines islands was opened to the Protestant missions after it was ceded to the United States administration.

An idea of establishing an industrial for boys and theological seminary to train Christian workers and ministers thereafter was conceived. Then in 1901, a grant was given by the American industrialist, philanthropist, oil magnate, and devoted Northern Baptist John D. Rockefeller to establish mission schools in the islands to the American Baptist Churches. The Philippine Baptist Conference voted later in December 1904 to establish two schools, an industrial school for boys and a Bible school to train ministers and other Christian workers. The task to found the mission schools was given to American missionary William Orison Valentine, who also became the first presidents of the both schools, with other missionaries as co-founders. Before it, Valentine and Miss Van Allen were married back in 1903 and thereafter, the couple left for the new appointment in Iloilo in the Philippines.

The CPU College of Theology is closely associated with the Jaro Evangelical Church, the first Baptist church in the Philippines (first Protestant church outside Manila).

In the summer of 1905 (June), the Baptist Missionary Training School was established by the Reverend William Orison Valentine in their home and later in the fall of 1905, the Jaro Industrial School was established. The leadership of the Bible School was turned over to the Reverend Henry Munger who conducted classes off campus. In 1907, Dr. Eric Lund became principal and classes were held at the Mission Press building where Lund was doing his Scripture translation work. When Dr. Lund left in 1912, the Bible School was closed. It was reopened in 1913 by Reverend Alton Bigelow. It was under his leadership that the school began to have a definite direction in its development.

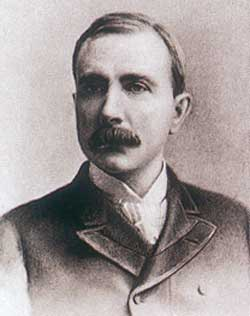
American industrialist, philanthropist, and devoted Northern Baptist John D. Rockefeller gave a grant in 1901 to the American Baptist Churches to establish mission schools in the Philippine islands. The task to found the missions schools was given to the American missionary William Valentine.

In 1923, the Jaro Industrial School became Central Philippine College. In April of the following year, the Baptist Missionary Training School became an organic part of the college. A program leading to the degree of Bachelor of Theology was offered. Those who enrolled were men students who were trained to be pastors of the churches. In 1936, through the guidance of Rev. Alton Bigelow, the school became the Department of Theology of Central Philippine College.

While the Baptist Missionary Training School was established for the training of men to be pastors, the training of women to be missionaries began in 1907 with the establishment of separate seminary for women under the leadership of Miss Anna V. Johnson and Celia Sainz. Both were sent to the Philippines by the Women's American Baptist Foreign Mission Society. Miss Johnson was assigned in Capiz. The seminary for women continued to develop separately from the Baptist Missionary Training School until 1938, when it was merged with the Department of Theology of Central Philippine College. With the merging of the two schools, two degree programs were offered-the Bachelor of Theology and the Bachelor of Science in Religious Education. On April 1, 1953, Central Philippine College was granted government recognition as a university. Following this, the Department of Theology became the College of Theology. Gradually, the leadership of the university and the College of Theology was turned over to the Filipinos. A significant part of this Filipinization process took place in 1966 when Dr. Rex D. Drilon became the first Filipino President of the university.

== Affiliations ==
The college is affiliated with the Convention of Philippine Baptist Churches and a member of Association of Theological Education in South East Asia and the South East Asia Graduate School of Theology. It also maintains fraternal ties with American Baptist Churches, the Australian Baptist Mission Society, the Baptist World Alliance, the Asian Baptist Fellowship, the National Council of Churches in the Philippines and other Christian organizations.

=== Academic programs ===
The college has two departments: Religion and Ethics and Music. It provide various undergraduate and graduate degrees which are accredited with the Association for Theological Education in South East Asia. The college offers graduate programs through the Central Philippine University School of Graduate Studies.
