= South East Asia Graduate School of Theology =

Protestant graduate school in Manila, Philippines

- Type: Seminary, Graduate School (Private)
- Established: 1966
- Dean: Dr Sientje Merentek-Abram
- Chair of the Board: Rev Dr Thu En Yu
- Location: Manila, Philippines
- Affiliations: ATESEA, WOCATI
- Website: www.atesea.org/sindex.html

The South East Asia Graduate School of Theology (SEAGST) is a Protestant graduate school of theology, established in 1966 and operated by the Association for Theological Education in South East Asia (ATESEA) in cooperation with and on behalf of member schools of ATESEA. The headquarters is located in the offices of ATESEA in Manila, Philippines.

== Objectives and aims ==
=== Academics ===
SEAGST conducts programs of advanced and postgraduate theological studies at the masters and doctoral levels and grants the degree of Master of Theology (MTheol) and Doctor of Theology (DTheol) to students who would study at one of the approved campuses of SEAGST in the region.

The program makes available to graduates of approved theological schools in South East Asia the combined academic resources of the participating accredited schools so that suitable students may have the opportunity of continuing their studies within South East Asia. Selected students from outside the region may also be admitted to the program upon presentation of proper credentials and application form.

=== Aims ===
The specific aims of SEAGST are:

1. To assist in the intellectual and spiritual development of Asian theologians so that their Christian ministry will be enrich and be more effective.
2. To contribute to the emergence of contextual and Asia-oriented theology by providing the facilities, and opportunities for research into, and reflection upon, the Christian faith as it relates to the living faiths, cultures and traditions of Asia, and to contemporary Asian society and its problems.
3. To further the training of competent teachers for the theology faculties of the region and of leaders for Christian ministry in church and society.
4. To promote opportunities for the interchange of the graduate students and faculty members between the different participating institutions with a view to enhancing both a regional consciousness and Christian fellowship across the barriers of race, cultures and nations.

SEAGST claims to be ecumenical in doctrine and in its relationships to the Churches and participating schools. The faculty and students represent a board spectrum of Christian belief and denominational affiliation.

== Organisation ==
=== Governance ===
SEAGST is governed by a Board of Governors which is responsible for all financial and budgetary matters of SEAGST; takes action on requests from accredited schools to participate in program; upon the recommendation of Senate, authorizes conferment of degrees on successful candidates; appoints the Dean, and appoints the faculty of SEAGST on the recommendation of the Senate.

The current Chairperson of the Board of Governors is Dr. Thu En Yu from Malaysia.

=== Regional Campuses ===
As the SEAGST functions as a consortium of participating schools accredited by ATESEA and as a validator of the postgraduate degrees issued, the faculty and campuses of SEAGST is spread out over the whole South East Asian region. There are a total of 27 schools in seven geographical areas; each one headed by an Area Dean; within SEAGST. To qualify as a participating school, an institution normally must have at least three teachers with a Ph.D. or Th.D. or equivalent and sufficient library holdings or research at master and doctoral level.

The current geographical areas and their participating schools are:

==== Hong Kong Area ====
Area Dean: Dr. Ying Fuk-Tsang

- Divinity School of Chung Chi College, Chinese University of Hong Kong ^{website}

Shatin, New Territories

- Lutheran Theological Seminary ^{website}

Shatin, New Territories

==== Eastern Indonesia Area ====
Area Dean: Dr. Zakaria J. Ngelow

- Faculty of Theology, Indonesian Christian University of Tomohon

Tomohon, North Sulawesi

- Theology Department, Indonesian Christian University of Maluku

Ambon, Maluku

- Theological Seminary of Eastern Indonesia Makassar (STT INTIM Makassar) ^{website}

Makassar, South Sulawesi

- Faculty of Theology, Artha Wacana Christian University

Kupang, East Nusa Tenggara

- Toraja State Christian Institute (IAKN Toraja) ^{website}

Rantepao, South Sulawesi

==== Western Indonesia Area ====
Area Dean: Dr. E. Gerrit Singgih

- HKBP Theological Seminary (STT HKBP)

Pematang Siantar, North Sumatra

- Jakarta Theological Seminary (STT Jakarta) ^{website}

Jakarta, DKI Jakarta

- Faculty of Theology, Duta Wacana Christian University ^{website}

Yogyakarta, Yogyakarta

- Cipanas Theological Seminary (STT Cipanas) ^{website}

Cipanas, West Java

==== Malaysia-Singapore Area ====
Area Dean: Dr. Ezra Kok

- Trinity Theological College ^{website}

Upper Bukit Timah Road, Singapore

- McGilvary College of Divinity, Payap University ^{website}

Chiang Mai, Chiang Mai Province, Thailand

- Malaysia Theological Seminary ^{website}

Seremban, Negeri Sembilan, Malaysia

- Sabah Theological Seminary ^{website}

Kota Kinabalu, Sabah, Malaysia

==== Myanmar Area ====
Area Dean: Dr. Anna May Say Pa

- Myanmar Institute of Theology ^{website}

Insein, Yangon Division

- Myanmar Institute of Christian Theology

Insein, Yangon Division

- Kayin Baptist Seminary

Insein, Yangon Division

- Holy Cross Theological College

Yangon, Yangon Division

- Kachin Theological College

Nawng Nang, Myitkyina, Kachin State

==== Philippines Area ====
Area Dean: The Very Rev Thomas Maddela

- Adventist International Institute of Advanced Studies ^{website}

Silang, Cavite

- Central Philippine University College of Theology

Iloilo City, Iloilo

- Silliman University Divinity School

Dumaguete, Negros Oriental

- St. Andrew's Theological Seminary

Quezon City, Metro Manila

- Union Theological Seminary

Dasmariñas, Cavite

==== Taiwan Area ====
Area Dean: Dr. Huang Po-ho

- Tainan Theological College and Seminary ^{website}

Tainan

- Taiwan Theological College and Seminary ^{website}

Taipei

- Yu-Shan Theological College and Seminary ^{website}

Hualien, Hualien County

=== Accreditation ===
As an institution under the auspices of ATESEA, SEAGST is accredited by the same organisation.

== See also ==
- Association for Theological Education in South East Asia
- Asia Graduate School of Theology
