= University Church =

University Church may refer to:

- University Church of St Mary the Virgin, Oxford
- University Church, Central Philippine University
- Fordham University Church, New York City
- Loma Linda University Church, California
- Newman University Church, Dublin
- Church of St Mary the Great, Cambridge
- Church of St. Mary the Virgin, commonly known as the University Church, Budapest
- Church of the Jesuits, also known as the Church of the University, Valletta
