= East Asia School of Theology =

East Asia School of Theology 东亚神学院
- Type: Christian College
- Established: 1992
- Affiliations: Asia Theological Association, Association for Theological Education in South East Asia
- President: Rev Dr Chan Chong Hiok
- Location: Joo Chiat, Singapore; 1°18′44.1″N 103°50′52.2″E
- Colours: EAST Green; White
- Website: www.east.edu.sg

East Asia School of Theology (EAST; Chinese: 东亞神学院) is a theological school established in Singapore by Campus Crusade for Christ International as a legal division of Cru Asia Ltd. in 1992, with its stated mission to "develop and equip Christian leaders for the fulfilment of the Great Commission in East Asia and around the world."

== Academic programs ==
The school offers academic programs at graduate diploma, bachelor's and master's degree levels. The accredited degree programs are:

- Graduate Diploma
- Bachelor of Arts (in Christian Ministry)
- Master of Arts (in Biblical Studies, Christian Ministry, Intercultural Studies, Leadership, or Theological Studies)
- Master of Divinity (in Christian Ministry, Intercultural Studies, or Teaching & Exposition)

== Accreditation and affiliation ==
The school is accredited by the Asia Theological Association (ATA) to offer the graduate diploma, bachelor's and master's degrees and the Association for Theological Education in South East Asia (ATESEA) to offer the Master of Divinity degree.

It is a member of the International Leadership Consortium (ILC), a global network of theological and leadership development institutions. The school is a member of the Fellowship of Missional Organisations of Singapore (FOMOS). According to the group's website, FOMOS was formed with the intention of "fulfilling the Great Commission through mutual edification and effective partnerships."

EAST is a member of the Asia Graduate School of Theology Alliance consortium (AGST Alliance), which consists of schools from Cambodia, Malaysia, Myanmar, Singapore and Thailand.
