= APTS =

APTS may refer to:

- (3-Aminopropyl)triethoxysilane, a chemical reagent
- Alliance du personnel professionnel et technique de la santé et des services sociaux, a Canadian healthcare trade union
- America's Public Television Stations, an advocacy organization for public television
- Asia Pacific Theological Seminary, a theological seminary in Baguio City, the Philippines
