= Kachin Theological College =

Theological College in Kachin State, Myanmar

Coordinates: 25.49678°N 97.44755°E

Kachin Theological College and Seminary (KTCS) is a member of the Association for Theological Education in South East Asia (ATESEA). It is located in Nawng Nang, Myitkyina, Kachin State, in northern Myanmar. It is an evangelical school under Kachin Baptist Convention (KBC).

== History ==
Kachin Theological College and Seminary was founded in 1932 (94 years ago) by missionaries in Bhamo, Kachin State. In 1935, the Bible School transferred to Kutkai, Northern Shan State, and the course was extended to 2 years. In 1966 Bible School moved to the present campus situated in Nawng Nang, Myitkyina, Kachin State. The Diamond Jubilee (75th anniversary) celebration along with the 58th commencement service of the college will be held on March 24–30, 2008.
