= Jaro Evangelical Church =

- The First Baptist Church in the Philippines (First Protestant Church Outside Manila)

- Republic of the Philippines
- 10°41′24″N 122°33′0″E
- Location: Jaro, Iloilo City, Iloilo
- Country: Philippines
- Denomination: Protestant Baptist
- Website: https://jaroevangelicalchurch.org

History
- Status: Active
- Founded: 1900 (First church structure and founding of the organization)
- Founder: Eric Lund

Architecture
- Architectural type: Church
- Style: American Colonial, semi-gothic

The Jaro Evangelical Church (JEC) is a Baptist church in Jaro, Iloilo City, Philippines, affiliated with the Convention of Philippine Baptist Churches. Founded in 1900, it is the first Baptist Church in the Philippines (first Protestant church outside Manila).

The church became a catalyst in founding the Central Philippine University (CPU), the first Baptist and second American university in the Philippines and in Asia, established through the benevolent grant of American industrialist and philanthropist, John D. Rockefeller in 1905.

The church, which is adjacent to Plaza Jaro (Graciano Lopez-Jaena Park), is part of the Plaza Jaro Heritage Tourism Zone.

The Jaro Evangelical Church is associated with the CPU College of Theology, the first Baptist theological seminary in the country; and maintains affiliation with the Convention of Philippine Baptist Churches and the American Baptist Churches USA.

== History ==
On February 28, 1900, Dr. Eric Lund and Braulio Manikan of the American Baptist Missionary Union arrived in Iloilo City followed by Rev. Charles Briggs and founded the church at Castilla Street in Jaro City, Iloilo.

At the same time, Lund and Manikan corroborated by Placido Mata, Vicente Doronila and Pascual Araneta translated the Bible to Hiligaynon vernacular – Ang Bagong Katipan (New Testament) and Ang Daan nga Katipan (Old Testament).

In 1904, Rev. Charles Briggs opened out stations in Pavia, La Paz and Hinaktakan. In 1905, Lund helped organized the Baptist Training School and the Jaro Industrial School (now Central Philippine University), spread to Capiz where they established a Home School (now Filamer Christian University).

In 1923, a new church was built at the Plaza Jaro (the present site). Lastly, in 1950, a newer church (the present one) was built on the same site under Rev. Elmer Fridell. In 1952, the church was finished and was dedicated with Dr. Peter Hugh Lerrigo, the former president of Central Philippine University, where he delivered his dedication message.

During World War II, the church was used by the Japanese Imperial Army. After the war, services resumed in the church, where Rev. Vaflor and United States Army Chaplain Weavers preached.

The current pastors of Jaro Evangelical Church are Rev. Sharon Joy Ruiz-Duremdes, Rev. Martha Mae Luces, Pastor Reinel Abogadial, and Pastor Gnezel Delatore

== Beliefs ==
The church has a Baptist confession of faith and is a member of the Convention of Philippine Baptist Churches.

== See also ==
- Protestantism in the Philippines
- Convention of Philippine Baptist Churches
