= Wesleyan University Philippines =

Christian university in Nueva Ecija, Philippines

- Pamantasang Wesleyan ng Pilipinas (Filipino)
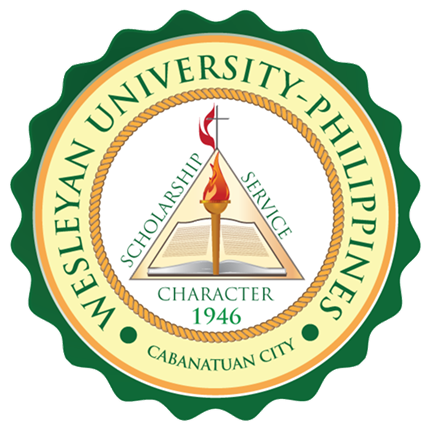
- Former name: Philippine Wesleyan College
- Motto: Scholarship, Service, Character
- Type: Private, Non-Sectarian basic and higher education institution
- Established: July 1, 1946; 80 years ago
- Religious affiliation: United Methodist Church
- President: Ireneo G. Alvaro Jr, PhD
- Vice-president: Wilfredo C. Ramos, EdD (VP for Academic Affairs); Gladys P. Mangiduyos, PhD Ed (VP for Administration and Planning); Marites A. Castaneda, PhD (VP for Finance)
- Dean: List: John Mark F. Bondoc, EdD (Graduate School); Marietta B. Agustin, PhD (College of Arts and Sciences); Jelwin D. Bautista, MBA (College of Business and Accountancy); Carissa Juliana R. Balaria, PhD (College of Nursing); Lucille Grace C. Hilario, PhD (College of Education); Dulce Amor S. Padilla, PhD ( College of Hospitality and Tourism Management); Mercenario I. Santos, PhD (College of Criminal Justice Education); Engr. Ryan John De Lara, PhD (College of Engineering and Computer Technology); Kay Ann J. Tongol, MScPhm (College of Allied Medical Sciences); Retired Judge Inocencio Sagun (John Wesley School of Law and Governance); Darren J. Gonzales, LLM (Associate Dean, John Wesley School of Law and Governance); Ian Val C. Uy, MD (College of Medicine); Emmanuel Y. Lambon, MD (Associate Dean, College of Medicine); Tita B. Camat, PhD (High School Department); Cristy M. Fernando, EdD (Elementary Department)
- Director: List: Crystalyn Galindo, MAEd (Director of Office for Student Affairs); Lyndon John S. de Leon, JD (University Registrar); Carmelita A. Tiglao, EdD (University Librarian); Gener S. Subia, PhD (Research Development and Productivity Office Director); Eufemia C. Ayro (Wesleyan External Systems, Connections, Opportunities, and Partnerships OIC-Director); Annie Dinh Maria M. Alfaro, PhD (Guidance and Placement Center Director); Juanito C. Leabres, Jr., PhD (Interim Director, Office of Instruction and Director, Office for Lifelong Learning); Laurence De Guzman, MD, MHA (University Physician); Henry Cocoy DR. Nacpil, PhD (Head, Cultural Affairs and Sports Development Office); Rio Anne B. Dizon (Head Executive Assistant to the President and Director, Office of Internationalization and Linkages); Michael Angelo T. Reyes, LlB (Legal Counsel); John Jason Villaroman, PhD (Director, Quality Assurance Office); Mark Alvin B. dela Cruz, MADE (Director, Public Information Office and OIC, Archives Office); Arnold Ateneo V. Lucas (ICT Office Director); Ana Marie S. Manuel, MBA (Acting Internal Auditor); Joepet G. Portana, PhD (OIC-Director, Alumni Affairs Office); Francis V. Fajardo, DMin (University Chaplain); Rhodalyn C. Lucas (University Treasury); Marites A. Castaneda, PhD (Acting University Accountant) Abraham A. Pascua, PhD, CESO III (HRDO Director); Emma G. Mangabat, MBA (Head, Business Center and Procurement Office); Josef Z. Nacino, PhD (Director, Asset Management Office); Jaziel Naomi C. Reyes, EdD (OIC-Director, Gender and Development Office); Mercinario I. Santos, PhD (Chief, University Security Office); Mark Edson M. Tamondong (Head, Maintenance and Engineering Office); Crizaldo B. Vicencio, JD (OIC, General Services Office); Marvin S. Guivani (Head, Transportation Unit)
- Location: Cabanatuan, Nueva Ecija, Philippines; 15°29′04″N 120°58′34″E
- Campus: Main: Cushman Campus 7 hectares (70,000 m^{2}) Cabanatuan, Nueva Ecija Satellite: Aurora Campus Maria Aurora, Aurora
- Hymn: Wesleyan Hymn
- Colors: Green and Yellow
- Nickname: Wesleyan Riders
- Mascot: Circuit Rider
- Website: www.wesleyan.edu.ph
- Location in Nueva Ecija Location in Luzon Location in the Philippines

Wesleyan University-Philippines (WU-P) is a private, Protestant, non-sectarian, and non-profit higher education institution run by the United Methodist Church (UMC) in Cabanatuan, Nueva Ecija. It was founded in 1946 as the Philippine Wesleyan College and named after John Wesley, the founder of Methodism.

The university offers preschool, grade school, high school undergraduate, and graduate programs. In 2009. the university was granted autonomy status by the Commission on Higher Education.

== History ==
The university was conceived by a group of Filipino and American Methodists led by the late Rev. Carlos Mañacop Sr. as part of the realization of their ecclesiastic mission. It was founded on July 1, 1946, and was named Philippine Wesleyan College. It was incorporated on April 28, 1948. The institution was named in memory of John Wesley, the founder of Methodism. It started operating in "sawali" and wooden structure erected on an 800-square meter lot at the corner of Quimzon and Mabini Streets in Cabanatuan, with its first set of 19 faculty and staff and batch of 368 students enrolled in Liberal Arts, Education, Elementary and High School programs. The university was granted government recognition on June 26, 1947, and incorporated on April 28, 1948.

The institution attained its University Status on April 24, 1978, and has since carried the name Wesleyan University-Philippines. Since its elevation to university status, it has grown in terms of academic programs, student enrolment, physical plant and facilities, faculty and staff, research and extension and other support services. It has also expanded its operations. Today, it operates in two campuses, Cabanatuan or the Cushman Campus, and Maria Aurora.

Eleven administrators took turns in steering the growth of Wesleyan University-Philippines. Each contributed in bringing the university to its present glorious status, an esteemed educational landmark in the region. The first president of the institution was Dr. Dionisio D. Alejandro (1946–1947), the first Filipino Bishop of the United Methodist Church of the Philippines. He was succeeded by Rev. Carlos Mañacop Sr. (1947–1952); followed by Dr. Roxy Lefforge (1952–1954); then Dr. Asuncion A. Perez (1954–1967), the first female cabinet member who served as a Social Welfare Administrator under four Philippine presidents. She was followed by Dr. Fidel F. Galang (1967–1970)

In 1970, Dr. Gloria D. Lacson, a former dean of the Mary Johnston College of Nursing was elected as the 6th College president. She served for twenty-four years and was eventually the first university president in 1978 when the institution was granted its university status. During her term, nine new programs were offered and the Information and Development Desk was created which later became the Research and Development Office. It was also under her leadership that the university had enormous improvements in terms of facilities as seen in the construction of several buildings which now house the different academic programs of the university.

Dr. Emmanuel G. Cleto, a former Commissioner of the Civil Service Commission, was appointed president from 1995 to 2000. Two new programs were added in the degree offerings of the university. The four-storey Alejandrino Hall which houses the College of Computer Studies and the three-storey Elementary Building were constructed during his term.

Dr. Zenaida P. Lumba, former president of Harris Memorial College, was elected as the eighth president (2001–2005) and it was during her stewardship that the university attained deregulated status. The Millennium Building was constructed during her term. It now houses the College of Hotel and Tourism Management, Graduate School and Law School. The John Wesley Park which is now the distinct landmark of the university was also constructed.

In 2005, Atty. Guillermo T. Maglaya was elected as the 9th president of the university. During his term, the WUP Cardiovascular Diagnostic Center and Hospital became operational and was dubbed as the Heart Center of the North. It was under his leadership and his vice president for academic affairs, Dr. Anselmo D. Lupdag, that the university was granted a five-year Autonomous Status (2009–2014) by the Commission on Higher Education.

In 2009, Prof. Manuel G. Palomo was elected as the tenth president. He was known for restoration of the Supreme Student Council and implementation of improved salary scheme for faculty and staff. Make-over of the campus physical facilities, refurbishing of buildings, provision of Wi-Fi internet connection and air-conditioned classrooms were accomplished during his tenure. Also, more programs in health sciences were offered thus renaming the College of Nursing as the College of Nursing and Allied Medical Sciences.

In 2012, Hon. Pacifico B. Aniag was elected as the 11th president. He was known for achieving financial stability of the university. Also, five new programs were offered including the Bachelor of Laws. During his term, the university was granted another three years as Autonomous University (2006–2019) by the Commission on Higher Education and Institutional Accreditation by Federation of Accrediting Agencies of the Philippines (FAAP) from September 2014 to April 2018. Two four-storey buildings that replaced the old agricultural building were constructed during his presidency. His graceful exit from office is historic as he was the first president to retire from his post which paved the way for smooth transition of leadership.

On January 24, 2019, Hon. Benjamin D. Turgano, a retired judge and a man of Methodist faith was elected as the 12th president of the university. His election into the University Presidency is historic as he was the first president who was chosen through a search and screening committee. As a man of law and of God, Hon. Turgano assured the Wesleyan community that under his leadership, no judgment will be rendered unless all sides have been heard. Issues and concerns of different units will be heard through dialogs and collegial discussions. He also emphasized that transparency, efficiency, accountability and continuous improvements will be the standards that will govern the academic and administrative operations and procedures in the university during his presidency.

== List of presidents ==
Seq.	President	Term of office	Known for
1	Dionisio Deista Alejandro	1946–1947	The first Filipino Bishop of the United Methodist Church of the Philippines, elected in 1944.
2	Carlos Mañacop Sr.	1947–1952	Co-founder.
3	Roxy Lefforge	1952–1954	Also served as Executive Dean of the Philippine Christian College in Manila.
4	Asuncion Perez	1954–1967	First Filipino woman to hold a cabinet position as Social Welfare secretary and Administrator from 1948 to 1953, as well as one of the original board of trustees of the Philippine Rural Reconstruction Movement.
5	Fidel P. Galang	1967–1970	Chaplain of the HUKBALAHAP Forces during the Japanese Occupation in the Philippines.
6	Gloria D. Lacson	1970–1993	Former Dean of the Mary Johnston College of Nursing of the then Philippine Christian College and a retired Colonel of the Nursing Corps of the Armed Forces of the Philippines. First University President of Wesleyan University-Philippines.
7	Emmanuel G. Cleto	1993–1994; 1994–2001 (OIC)	Retired Judge and former Commissioner of the Civil Service Commission. Acted as WU-P's officer-in-charge from December 4, 1993, to March 20, 1994. Appointed as acting president by WU-P Board of Trustees in 1994 to 2001.
8	Zenaida Lumba	2001–2004	Former President of Harris Memorial College.
9	Guillermo T. Maglaya	2004–2009	Former National Bureau of Investigation and Ninoy Aquino International Airport Administrator. Acted as officer-in-charge in 2004 and formally installed as president in 2005.
10	Manuel G. Palomo	2009–2011	Businessman; former College Dean in the university from the 80s; only WUP alumnus who became president.
11	Pacifico B. Aniag	2011–2019	Board member, Provincial Government of Bulacan
12	Benjamin D. Turgano	2019–2024	Retired RTC Judge from Laoag City, Ilocos Norte
13	Irineo G. Alvaro	2024–present	–

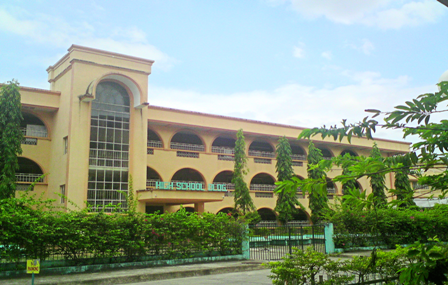
High School Building

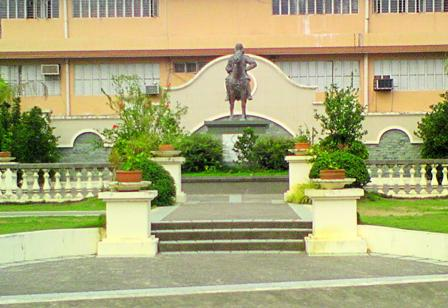
Statue of John Wesley stands prominently at the J.W. Park adjacent to the Administration Building.

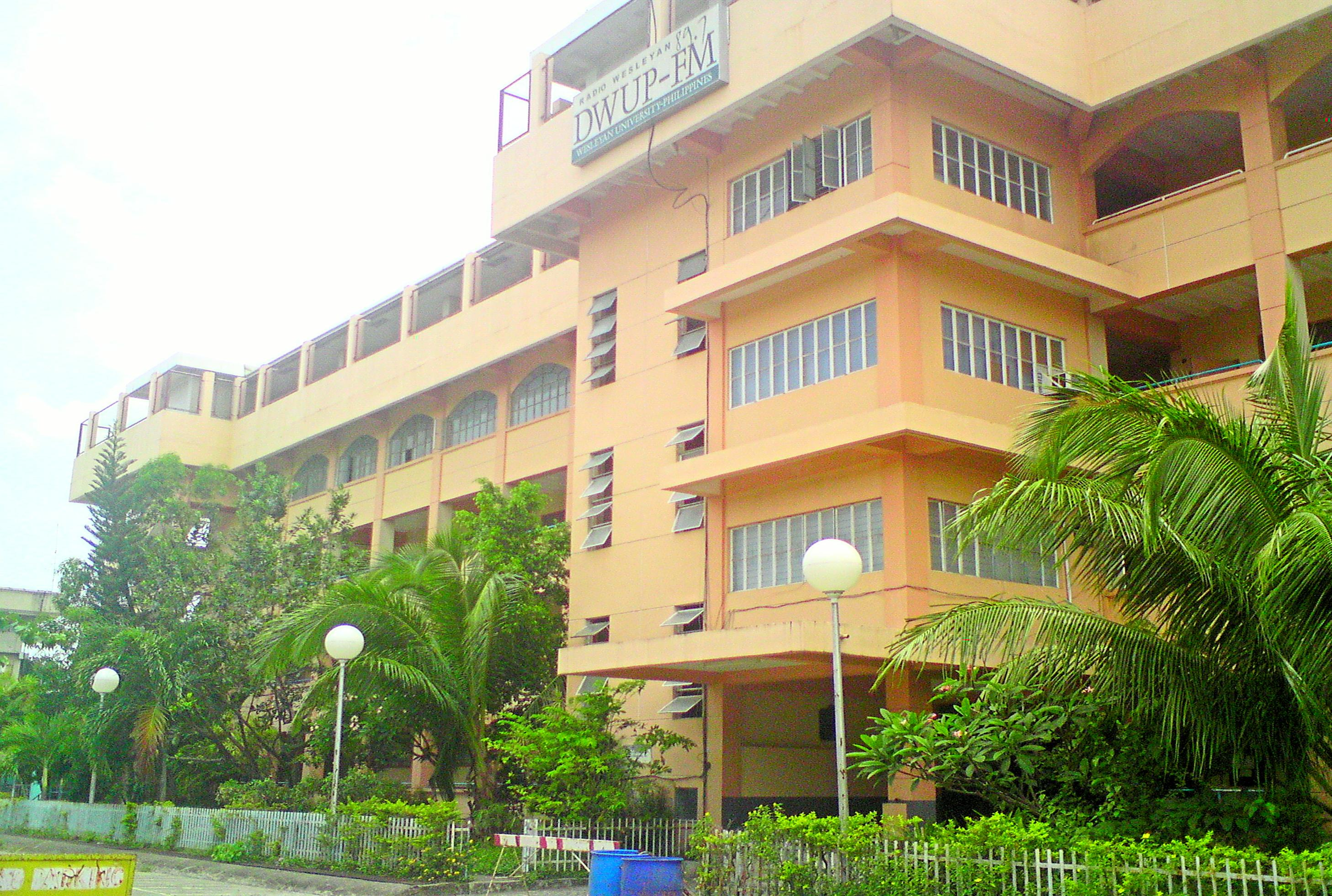
Computer Science Building

== Campus ==
The university has three campuses in Central Luzon: the Cushman Campus, Aurora Extension Campus, and Tarlac Campus.

Cushman Campus is a seven-hectare plus area located at Cabanatuan which was donated by Methodist Bishop Ralph Cushman. The campus was established as the university's center of operation after transferring from the dilapidated Del Pilar Street campus; more than 30 buildings were constructed since the establishment of Cushman Campus.

Methodist missionaries working in Aurora province during the late 1980s established a school in Aurora which they named Wesleyan College. This school was later acquired by the Wesleyan University and developed into WU-P's first campus outside Nueva Ecija.

== Accreditation and recognition ==
The university operates five programs with Level II Accreditation Status as certified by the Federation of Accrediting Agencies of the Philippines (FAAP) and the Association of Christian Schools and Colleges Accrediting Agency, Inc. These programs are the pre-school, elementary, high school, accountancy and the graduate school. The Colleges of Arts and Sciences, Education, and Business Administration have Level III Accreditation status.

In 1990–1991, Wesleyan University-Philippines was identified by the Philippine Association for Teacher Education as the regional center for teacher education. The College of Education serves also as a Teacher-Training Institution (TTI) for the training of secondary Science and Mathematics teachers.

In 1991–1992, WU-P was nominated by the DECS Regional Office III as one of the so-called "excellent schools" in Region III. Likewise, the Philippine Historical Association named WU-P a Regional Nucleus School. The university serves as the seat of the non-government organizations (NGOs) forum in Nueva Ecija and the center for Drug Prevention Education in the province. The College of Technology is a Center of Development for Region III, a recognition granted by the Commission on Higher Education III.

The Commission on Higher Education granted the university a Deregulated Status in 2004. In the most recent evaluation conducted in 2005 by the Commission on Higher Education, the WU-P Graduate School was rated "very good", besting all other schools in Region III including state universities and colleges.

The university has been granted a five-year autonomous status by the Commission on Higher Education effective March 11, 2009. An autonomous status allows universities to design their own curricula, offer new programs and put up branches or satellite campuses without having to secure permits, confer honorary degrees, and carry out operations without much interference from the commission. It is the fourth private school to be granted autonomy in Central Luzon, joining a list of 22 other autonomous private schools nationwide that include Ateneo de Manila, De La Salle, Assumption College, Miriam College Foundation, St. Joseph's College of Quezon City, University of Santo Tomas and Centro Escolar University, among others.

== Notable alumni ==
- Ben G. Domingo – Journalism professor, mountain climber, and sportsman; first Filipino accredited as international referee by the Badminton World Federation and the Badminton Asia Confederation.
- Rowena Festin – Writer, winner of the Carlos Palanca Memorial Awards for Literature
- Patricia Llena – Power lifter and Youth Olympic Gold Medalist
- Jaime J. Bautista – President/CEO, Philippines Airlines and vice chair of the University of the East's (UE) Board of Trustees.
- Dr. Proceso T. Domingo – Undersecretary, Department of National Defense
- Dr. Hilario C. Ortiz – President, Nueva Ecija University of Science and Technology (NEUST)
- Jose Gamboa Jr. – Bishop, United Methodist Church
- Solito K. Toquero – Bishop, United Methodist Church
- Mildred T. Ancheta – 2006 Ten Outstanding Principals of the Philippines Awardee
- Elenita Bautista-Malicse – Outstanding Filipino Nurse Award – Nurse Educator Category
- Elaine Cris N. delos Reyes – 2008 Ayala Young Leader
- Jerome Dayao – 2006 Ten Outstanding Students of the Philippines awardee
- Luzviminda Gutierrez-Palad – Philippine Nurses Association of Metropolitan Houston (PNAMH) Outstanding Filipino Nurse (OFN) Award – Nurse Researcher Category
- Rose Marielle C. Mamaclay – 2008 World Championships of the Performing Arts gold multi-medalist
