= Convention of Philippine Baptist Churches =

Christian denomination in the Philippines

- Kasapulanan sang Bautista nga Pilipinhon
- Abbreviation: CPBC
- Classification: Protestant
- Orientation: Baptist
- Scripture: Protestant Bible
- Theology: Evangelical and Mainline
- Polity: Congregational
- General Secretary: Rev. Danilo Borlado B.Th., M.Th.
- Associations: Baptist World Alliance; World Council of Churches; National Council of Churches in the Philippines; Christian Conference of Asia; Asia Pacific Baptist Federation
- Region: Philippines
- Headquarters: Jaro, Iloilo City, Philippines
- Origin: February 1900; 126 years ago Jaro, Iloilo City
- Congregations: 1,400
- Members: 700,000
- Tertiary institutions: Central Philippine University; Filamer Christian University
- Seminaries: Central Philippine University College of Theology
- Official website: www.cpbcph.org

The Convention of Philippine Baptist Churches (CPBC) (Hiligaynon: Kasapulanan sang Bautista nga Pilipinhon) is a mainline Protestant denomination in the Philippines. It is affiliated with the Baptist World Alliance and is headquartered in Jaro, Iloilo City. CPBC was founded in 1900 as the oldest and first organized union of Baptist churches in the Philippines. This occurred after the country opened to Protestant American missions in 1898, following Spain's transfer of the Philippine islands administration to the United States.

CPBC is associated with the American Baptist Foreign Mission Society (now International Ministries) and played a key role in establishing the Jaro Evangelical Church, the first Baptist church in the Philippines outside Manila. CPBC has affiliations with various institutions, including Central Philippine University, the first Baptist and second Protestant university in the country. Additionally, CPBC is affiliated with the CPU College of Theology, the first Baptist theological seminary in the Philippines; Filamer Christian University, the first Baptist school in the country; and Capiz Emmanuel Hospital, the first Baptist hospital in the Philippines.

In the 1930s, CPBC also became affiliated with the Iloilo Mission Hospital, initially founded by Protestant Presbyterians and later transferred to the Baptists (CPBC). The Iloilo Mission Hospital is the first American and Protestant hospital in the Philippines.

At present, besides being affiliated with the American Baptist Churches USA, the organization is a member of the National Council of Churches in the Philippines. It has over 1,000 affiliated Baptist churches and more than 600,000 members across the Philippines.

== History ==
Jaro Evangelical Church in Jaro, the First Baptist Church in the Philippines

The Convention of Philippine Baptist Churches has its origins in a foreign mission of the American Baptist Missionary Union on the island of Panay in February 1900, when the Philippines islands was opened to the Evangelical missions after it was ceded to the United States administration.

Eric Lund, a Swedish Baptist minister working under the auspices of the American Baptist Foreign Mission Society and one of the founding fathers of the Jaro Evangelical Church, translated the entire Bible into Hiligaynon, and the New Testament into two other dialects. In 1905, the Bible School and Jaro Industrial School were established through a grant given by the American Baptist, business magnate and philanthropist, John D. Rockefeller. The two schools later merged and became Central Philippine University, the first Baptist and second American university in the Philippines and Asia.

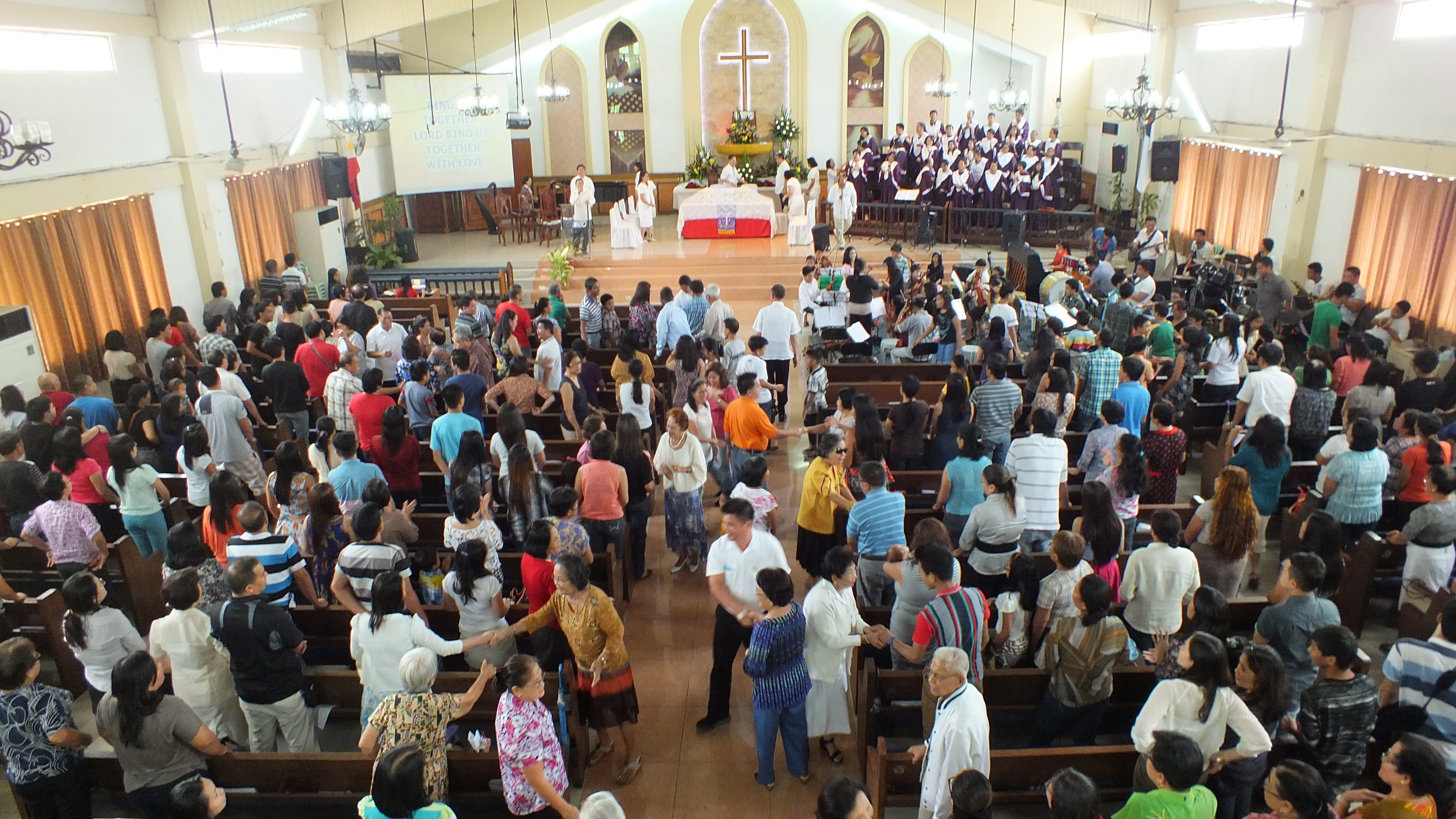
Worship service at Bacolod Evangelical Church in Bacolod, affiliated to the Convention.

In 1935 the formal formation of Convention of Philippine Baptist Churches was established. In 1980, Angelina Buensuceso became the first woman ordained pastor in the Convention.

According to a census published by the association in 2025, it claimed 1,400 churches and 700,000 members.

== Core Mission Principles ==
- Being grounded in the Biblical tradition
- Engagement in prophetic and priestly functions
- Building a community that heals and restores broken ties
- Developing of strong and responsible leaders
- Achieving stability through full support of member churches and organizations
- Building of a deeper and stronger relationship with other mission partners
- Deep and genuine concern for the lost, the poor, the weak and the needy
- Faithfulness to the Baptist legacy of missionary service
- A dynamic, relevant and responsive servant organization
- Deep commitment to the implementation of a holistic and comprehensive ministry
- Full use of appropriate technology to enhance programs and ministries

== Beliefs ==
The Convention has a Baptist confession of faith in Protestant theology. It is a member of the Baptist World Alliance and maintains ties with the American Baptist Churches USA, classifying itself as a mainline Protestant.

The Convention, being a Baptist denomination, believes in the Five solas as a theological principle of Protestantism.

== Schools ==
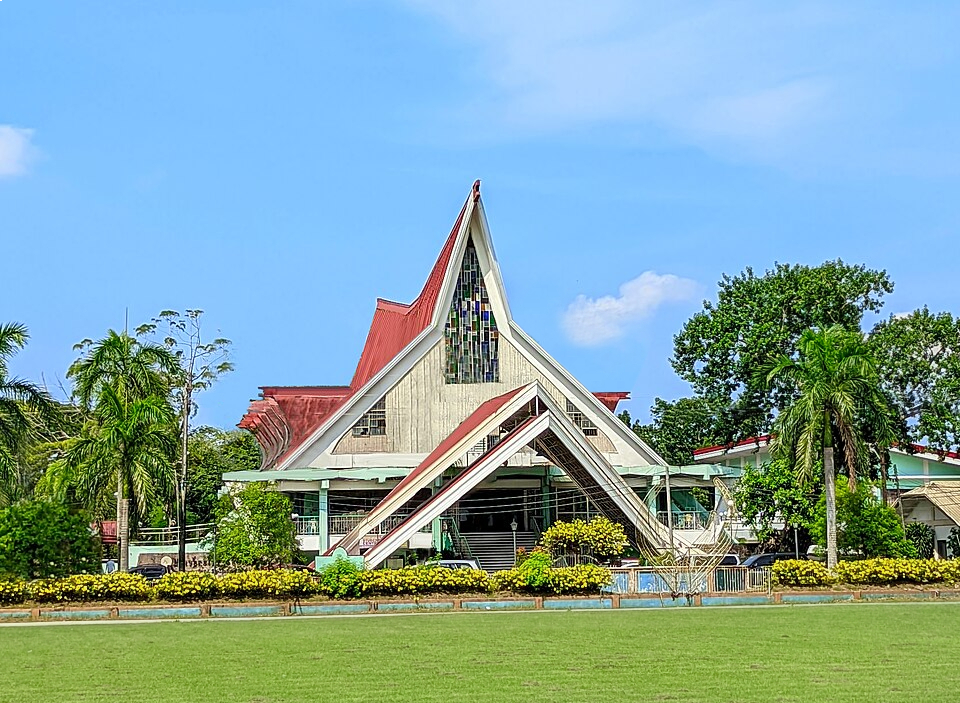
Central Philippine University in Iloilo City was founded in 1905 by the American Baptist Foreign Mission Society, through a benevolent grant of the American philanthropist and devout Baptist, John D. Rockefeller.

Baptist missionaries founded many schools and universities in the Philippines. Most notable of these is Central Philippine University (CPU), the first Baptist and second American university in the Philippines and in Asia (after Silliman University in Dumaguete), while Filamer Christian University is the first Baptist school in the Philippines.

CPU's earliest forerunner, the Central Philippine University College of Theology which was established four months earlier than the university's second precursor, the Jaro Industrial School, is the first Baptist theological seminary in the Philippines.

The CPU College of Nursing, an academic institution for nurses founded in 1906 as Union Mission Hospital Training School for Nurses by the Presbyterian Protestant American missionaries through the present day Iloilo Mission Hospital, is the first Nursing School in the Philippines. The Central Philippine University College of Nursing is also one of the leading nursing schools in the Philippines.

Central Philippine University's official student governing body, the CPU Republic (Central Philippine University Republic), is the oldest student government in the South East Asia. It was organized in 1905, one year after the founding of the school. The University's official publication, the Central Echo (CE) is the official student publication of CPU. It was founded in 1910, five years after Jaro Industrial School opened. It is one of the oldest student publications in the Philippines.

== See also ==
- Evangelicalism in the Philippines
- Bible
- Born again
- Baptist beliefs
- Jesus Christ
- Believers' Church
