= Dionisio Deista Alejandro =

Filipino Bishop

Dionisio Deista Alejandro (1893–1972) was the first Filipino Bishop of the Methodist Church, elected in 1944.

He was born 19 February 1893 in Quiapo, Manila, the Philippines. His ancestry was Filipino with slight admixture of Chinese. He was baptized in 1906 at the age of thirteen in San Isidro, Luzon by Bishop G.A. Miller, and was educated in the U.S. and the Philippines. He became a Member in Full Connection of the Philippine Islands Annual Conference in 1918. He was ordained deacon by Bishop Eveland and Elder by Bishops Stuntz and J.W. Robinson. Alejandro was the first delegate to the Central Conference of Southern Asia. Prior to his election to the Episcopacy he served as an evangelist, an educator, a pastor and an editor.

He was elected a Bishop during the Japanese occupation of the Philippines. Thus, he was not consecrated until 1946 (i.e., after liberation). He served the Manila Episcopal Area of the Philippines Central Conference of The Methodist Church. He was the Presiding Bishop of the Philippines and the Northern Philippines Annual Conferences.

Dionisio Alejandro was the first president of Philippine Wesleyan College (now Wesleyan University (Philippines)) from 1946 - 1947.

== Selected writings ==
- Mga Leksion sq Homiletica, 1919.
- A Brief History of the Philippines, in Tagalog, 1944. In English also.
- A Brief History of Methodism, with F.S. Galvez and D.W. Holton.
- Maikling Kasaysayan ng Philippines.
- Why Are We Protestants? 1945.
- Tr. The Baptism of the Holy Spirit, H.C. Morrison, and other pamphlets.
- "From Darkness to Light: A brief Chronicle of the Beginnings and Spread of Methodism in the Philippines," 1974.

== Biographies ==
- Sketch by Attorney Juan Nabong, Journal, 1944 (also in the Methodist Bishops' Collection at Southern Methodist University).
- From Roman Catholicism to the Protestant Faith, Personal Statement, Voices from Many Lands, 1915. (a typed copy of which also in the Methodist Bishops' Collection at Southern Methodist University).

== See also ==
- List of bishops of the United Methodist Church
- Wesleyan University (Philippines)
