= Filamer Christian University =

Christian university in Capiz, Philippines

Filamer Christian University, Inc.
- Pamantasang Kristiyano ng Filamer (Filipino)
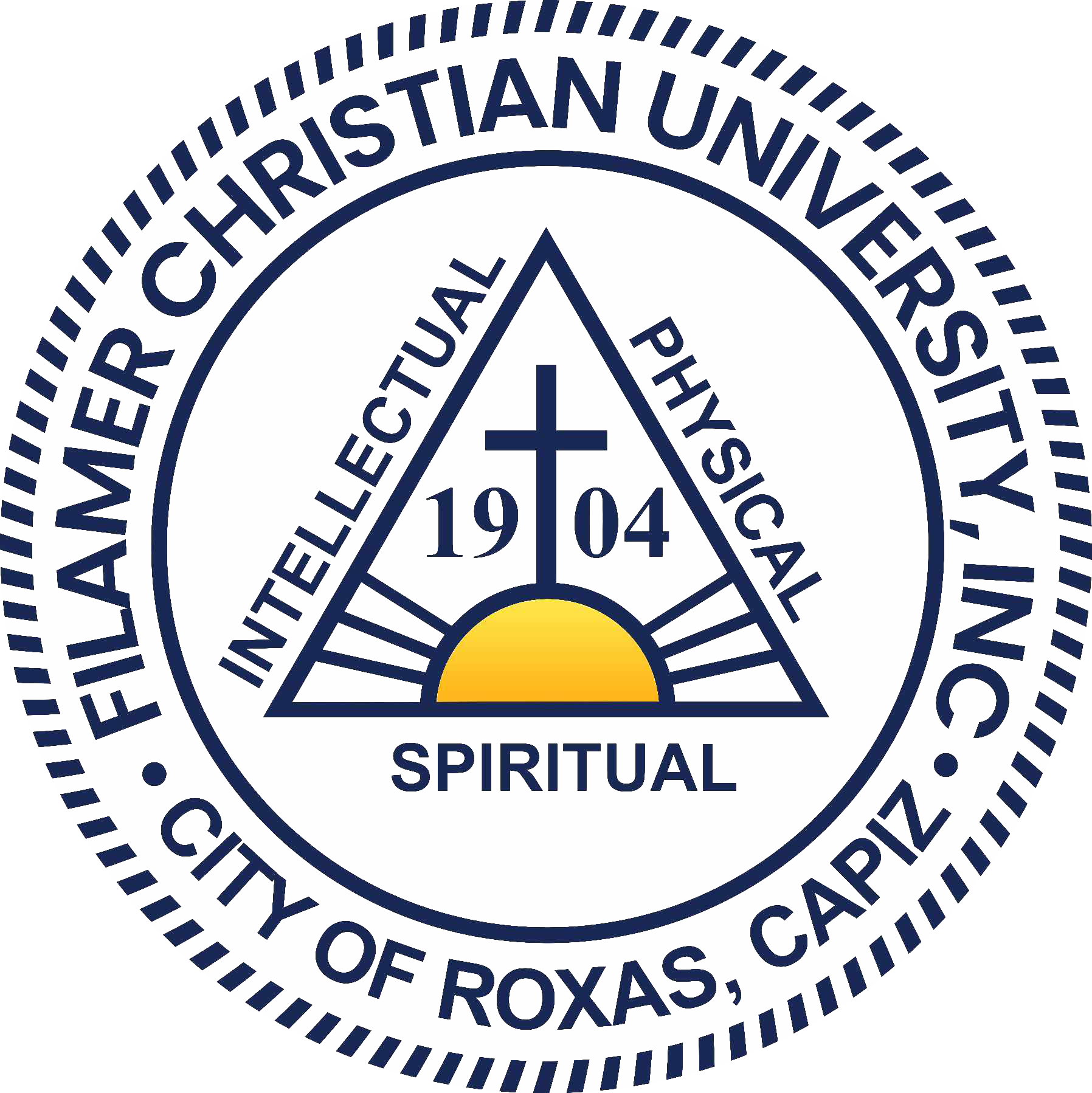
- Former names: Capiz Home School (1904–1952); Filamer Christian Institute (1952–1985); Filamer Christian College (1985–2010)
- Motto: "Intellectual, Physical, Spiritual"
- Type: Private non-sectarian and non-profit research coeducational basic and higher education institution
- Established: August, 1904
- Founder: Rev. Joseph C. Robbins
- Religious affiliation: Convention of Philippine Baptist Churches
- Academic affiliations: ACSCU-AAI, AP-HEI, ACUCA, FAAP, UMAP, PAASCU, CHED, UBCHEA, ASEAN
- President: Dr. George O. Cortel
- Vice-president: Dr. Minnie P. Chan (VP for Academic Affairs); Jorgen M. Gregorio (VP for Administration); Esther S. Arceño (VP for Finance)
- Principal: Urla S. Dela, MAT (High School Principal)
- Academic staff: 136
- Administrative staff: 106
- Students: 6000+ (2018-2019)
- Undergraduates: 1,831
- Postgraduates: 1,156
- Location: Roxas City, Capiz, Philippines; 11°34′32″N 122°45′08″E
- Campus: Urban, 38,234 m^{2} (411,550 sq ft)
- Hymn: Halls of Filamer
- Colors: Blue, white, & yellow
- Sporting affiliations: CAPRISA, CAPTESA, WVRAA, WVPRISAA,
- Website: www.filamer.edu.ph
- Location in the Visayas Location in the Philippines

Filamer Christian University, Inc. (FCUI) is a private Protestant Christian university located in Roxas City, Capiz, Philippines. It is affiliated with the Convention of Philippine Baptist Churches.

== History ==
The university has its origins in the founding of Capiz Home School in 1904 by Rev. and Mrs. Joseph Robbins with the help of the American Baptist Foreign Mission Society. In 1952, it took the name of Filamer Christian Institute and Filamer Christian College in 1985. It became a university in 2010.
