= Asia Pacific Theological Seminary =

Theological seminary in Baguio, Philippines

- Former name: Far East Advanced School of Theology
- Established: 1964
- Religious affiliation: Assemblies of God
- Location: 444 Ambuklao Rd., Baguio, 2600, Philippines; 16°25′42.1″N 120°37′22.6″E
- Colours: Dark blue and yellow
- Website: www.apts.edu
- Location in Luzon Location in the Philippines

Asia Pacific Theological Seminary (APTS) is a theological seminary in Baguio, Philippines, operated by the Assemblies of God.

APTS is part of Asia Graduate School of Theology, a consortium of evangelical theological seminaries established by the ATA in 1984 to enable member seminaries to offer higher degrees. According to Wonsuk and Julie Ma, APTS is a "well-respected institution, not only among Evangelicals, but also mainline churches". In conjunction with the Asian Pentecostal Society, APTS publishes the Asian Journal of Pentecostal Studies.

== Accreditation ==
APTS is accredited with theological agencies associated with all three main branches of the Protestant Christian family: Asia Theological Association (ATA) – evangelical, Association for Theological Education in South East Asia (ATESEA) – liberal, and Asia Pacific Theological Association (APTA) – Pentecostal/Charismatic. APTS also has received multiple degree recognitions from Commission on Higher Education (CHED) for the following degree programs:

- Master of Arts (MA) in Ministry
- Master of Arts (MA) in Intercultural Studies with Islamic Concentration
- Master of Divinity (M.Div.)
- Master of Theology (Th.M.) in Pentecostal/Charismatic Studies
- Doctor of Ministry (D.Min.) in Pentecostal/Charismatic Ministries

The Master of Divinity and Master of Arts degree programs are accredited by the Association for Theological Education in South East Asia (ATESEA), the Asia Theological Association (ATA), and the Asia Pacific Theological Association (APTA). Accreditation for the Master of Theology in Pentecostal Studies program has been arranged with the Association for Theological Education in South East Asia (ATESEA). Accreditation for the Doctor of Ministry (D.Min.) is granted from ATA and APTA.
