= Hawaii Theological Seminary =

Christian college and seminary in Hawaii, US

Coordinates: 21.5047°N 158.0032°W

The Hawaii Theological Seminary (formerly known as the International College and Graduate School) is a private, co-educational Christian college and seminary in Honolulu, Hawaii, United States.

Established in 1971 by James R. Cook and J. William Cook, the school grew out of the International Baptist Church of Honolulu and Western Seminary, a theological institution in Portland, Oregon. International College and Graduate School changed its name to Hawaii Theological Seminary in 2006. It is confessionally evangelical and deliberately transdenominational, seeking to provide ministry training for all Christians in Hawaii, as well as the nations of the Pacific and Pacific Rim.

The seminary confers the Certificate in Biblical Studies, but no longer confers the Bachelor of Arts (BA) in Biblical Studies, Master of Arts (MA) in Religion, Master of Divinity (M.Div.), and Doctor of Ministry (D.Min.).
