= Association for Theological Education in South East Asia =

South East Asian learned society devoted to theology

- Formation: 1957
- Location: Manila, Philippines
- Website: atesea.net

The Association for Theological Education in South East Asia (ATESEA) is an organisation of Christian seminaries and other tertiary institutes of theology. It is based in Manila, Philippines, and currently networks 102 member institutions and schools in 16 countries. It also acts as an accreditation agency for theological education in the South East Asian region.

ATESEA publishes the Asia Journal of Theology, provides accreditation services, operates the South East Asia Graduate School of Theology, and promotes faculty development, theological renewal and contextualization in the light of the "Critical Asian Principle", while coordinating regional planning in Christian theological education.

In 2007, ATESEA seminaries developed Guidelines for Doing Theologies in Asia, responding to the many challenges facing the region, including religious fundamentalism, ecological problems, natural disasters, globalisation and post-colonialism.

ATESEA is a full member of the World Conference of Associations of Theological Institutions (WOCATI) by which the association is networked with other regional associations and accreditation agencies for theological education worldwide like the Association of Theological Schools in the United States and Canada (ATS), the American Theological Library Association (ATLA) and the Board of Theological Education of the Senate of Serampore College (BTESS) in India.

== Aims and objectives ==
The aims of the ATESEA according to Section II of the association's constitution are as follows:

1. To promote creative relationships among institutions and agencies engaged in theological education and the churches in the region.
2. To facilitate regional efforts in theological education in the service of the churches in South East Asia.
3. To set guidelines and standards of theological education and to provide accreditation services to member institutions and to others requesting it.
4. To work for the improvement and renewal of theological education in the region in such ways it may deem appropriate.

== History ==
ATESEA was established as the Association of Theological Schools in South East Asia in 1957 in Singapore with 16 schools as founding members. The first full meeting was held in 1959 under the leadership of Benjamin I. Guansing of the Philippines and John R. Fleming was elected as the first executive director. The secretariat and offices of ATESEA was in Singapore from 1959 to 1974. In June 1974, ATESEA moved to Manila, Philippines when Emerito P. Nacpil was elected the executive director. It was again relocated to Singapore in 1981.

In 1981, the name of the association was changed to the current title and continued to expand its scope of operations to include the conducting of theological study institutes in disciplines of the theological spectrum such as the improvement of the management and administration of schools, the search for a new spirituality in Christian formation, the encouragement of the experiments in innovative or alternative patterns of theological education, the promotion of closer relationship between seminary and church, the search for a more adequate understanding of excellence in theological education and the development of Asian perspective and insights in Christian theology. It has also facilitated faculty exchange among its member schools and institutions.

In 1998, the secretariat and offices was again relocated to Manila; it has remained there to date.

== Accreditation ==
ATESEA runs an Accreditation Commission which provides accreditation for tertiary institutes of theology and seminaries. The commission is composed of the Executive Committee of ATESEA plus two people elected by the association, normally chosen from the Graduated School Senate.

Accreditation by ATESEA does not necessarily mean that the member institutions are granted accreditation by the education regulatory bodies of the countries where the institutions are. Many countries in the South East Asian region do not have a formal accreditation process for Christian theological education. In countries where such processes exist like Australia and Indonesia, ATESEA accredited institutions have also been accredited by the respective national and regional accreditation agencies.

== Membership ==
ATESEA has a two-tier membership: regular and affiliate. The former is open to institutions engaged in the provision of training for the Christian ministry in South East Asia and the latter open to institutions involved in theological education in South East Asia, such as research and study centers, lay training institutes, and Theological Education by Extension centers.

=== Member institutions ===
ATESEA has 95 member institutions in Australia, Cambodia, China, Hong Kong, Indonesia, Malaysia, Myanmar, Philippines, Singapore, Sri Lanka, Taiwan, Thailand and Vietnam.

A full list of ATESEA's member institutions can be found at Member Institutions ATESEA's website.

== Asia Journal of Theology ==
Asia Journal of Theology
- Discipline: Theology
- Language: English
- Edited by: Simon Chan

Publication details
- Former name: East Asia Journal of Theology
- History: 1983–present
- Publisher: Association for Theological Education in South East Asia
- Frequency: Biannual

Standard abbreviations
- ISO 4: Asia J. Theol.

Indexing
- ISSN: 0218-0812
- LCCN: 87942579
- OCLC no.: 705641609

Links
- Journal homepage

ATESEA publishes the Asia Journal of Theology, a biannual journal established in 1983 as the East Asia Journal of Theology (it obtained its current title in 1987). The editor-in-chief is Simon Chan (Trinity Theological College, Singapore). According to John Roxborogh, the Asia Journal of Theology has been a vehicle of theological ferment in Southeast Asia.

== Affiliations ==
- Forum of Asian Theological Librarians
- World Conference of Associations of Theological Institutions

== See also ==
- School accreditation
- Association of Theological Schools in the United States and Canada
