= Religion in the Philippines =

Religion in the Philippines (2020 census)
1. Catholicism (78.8%)
2. Evangelicalism (4.82%)
3. Protestantism (2.76%)
4. Iglesia ni Cristo (2.58%)
5. Islam (6.42%)
6. Other / None (4.61%)

Religion in the Philippines is predominated by Christianity, with Catholicism being its largest denomination. Sizeable minorities adhering to Islam, Dharmic religions (Buddhism, Hinduism, and Sikhism), and indigenous Philippine folk religions like Anitism are also present.

The country is officially secular and its constitution guarantees freedom of religion. Before the arrival of Spanish missionaries, the various ethnic groups residing in the territory of modern-day Philippines practiced a variety of faiths.

== Overview ==
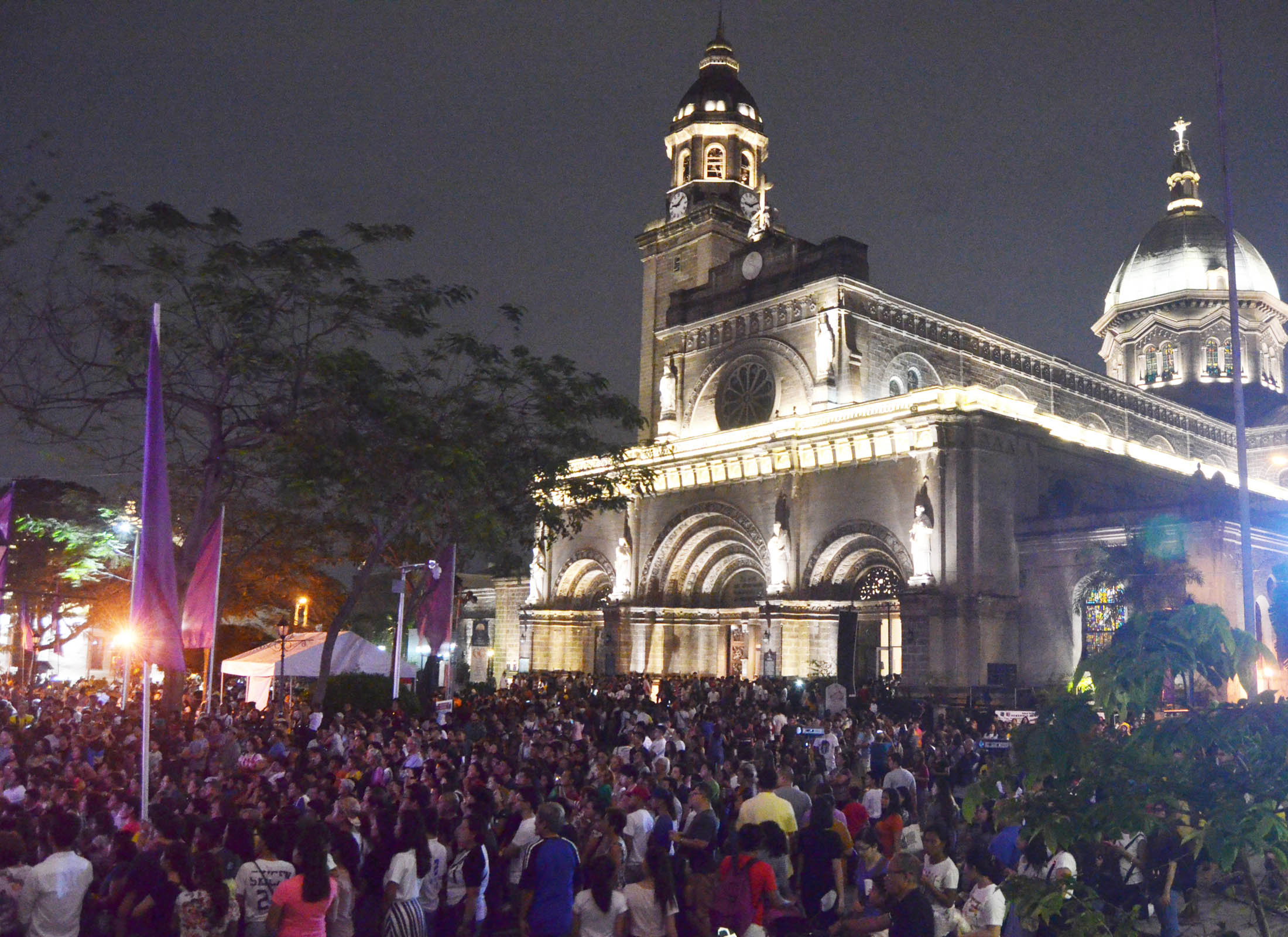
Devotees flock to the Manila Cathedral on Maundy Thursday in 2018 for the traditional Visita Iglesia.

According to the 2020 census combining all Christian categories, 91.5% of the population is Christian; 79% belong to the Catholic Church while 13% belong to Protestantism and other denominations such as Iglesia ni Cristo, Seventh-day Adventist Church, Church of Jesus Christ of Latter-Day Saints, Philippine Independent Church, Jehovah's Witnesses, Apostolic Catholic Church, United Church of Christ in the Philippines, Members Church of God International, and Pentecostals.

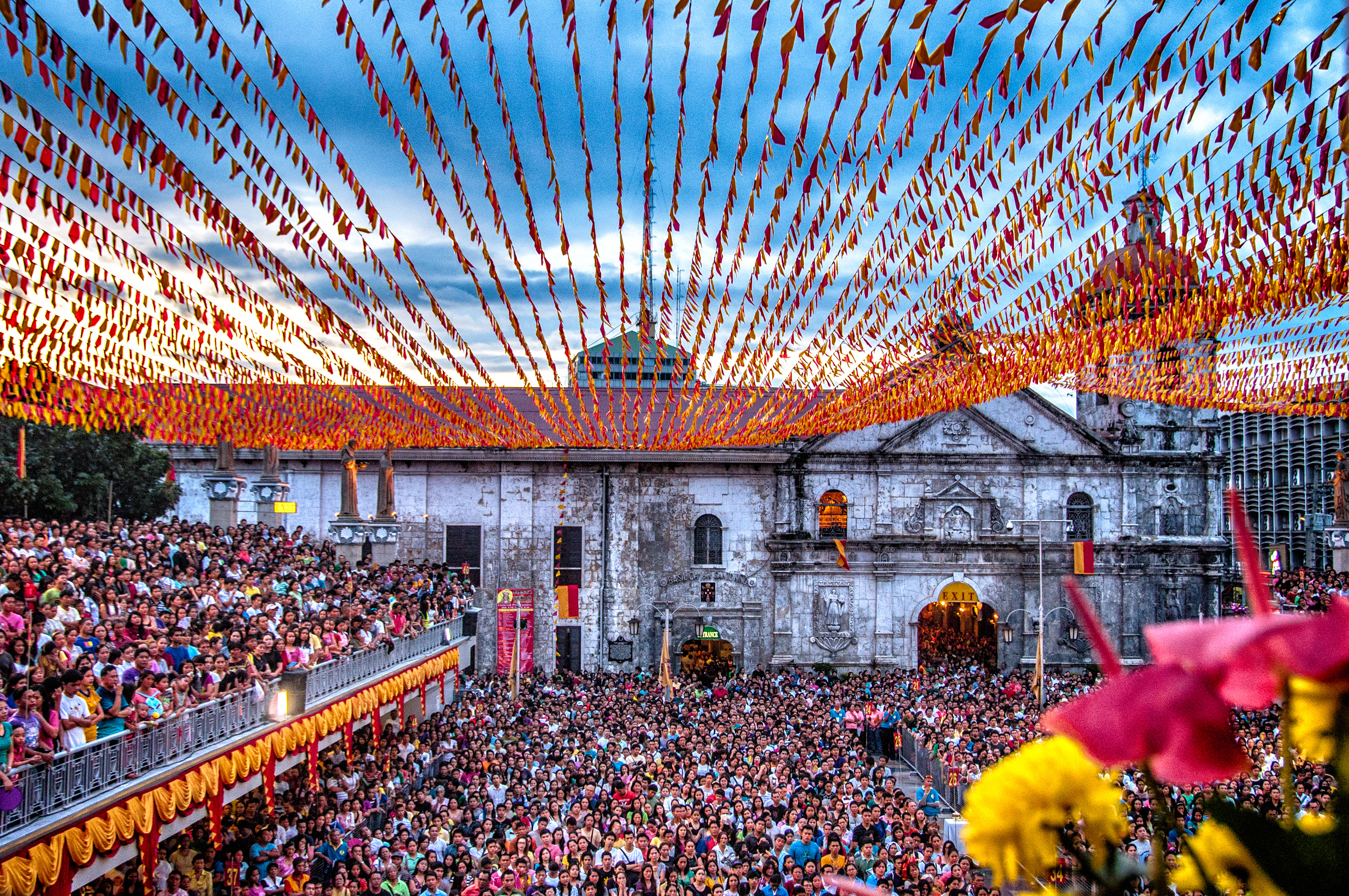
Filipino Christians attending Mass at Basilica del Santo Niño during the annual Sinulog festival in Cebu.

Indigenous Philippine folk religions (collectively referred to as Anitism or Bathalism), the traditional religion of Filipinos which predates Philippine Christianity and Islam, is practiced by an estimated 2% of the population, made up of many indigenous peoples, tribal groups, and people who have reverted into traditional religions from Catholic/Christian or Islamic religions. These religions are often syncretized with Christianity and Islam. Buddhism is practiced by 0.04% of the Philippine population by the Japanese-Filipino community, and, together with Taoism and Chinese folk religion, is also dominant in Chinese communities. There are also smaller number of followers of Sikhism, Hinduism as well. Irreligion in the Philippines is very low, with 0.04% of the Philippine population self-reporting in 2020 as having no religion.According to the 2015 census, Evangelicals comprised 2% of the population. It is particularly strong among American and Korean communities, Northern Luzon especially in Cordillera Administrative Region, Southern Mindanao and many other tribal groups in the Philippines. Protestants both mainline and evangelical have gained significant annual growth rate up to 10% since 1910 to 2015.

About 6.4% of the population of the Philippines is Muslim as of 2020, making Islam the second largest religion in the country. The majority of Muslims live in parts of Mindanao, Palawan, and the Sulu Archipelago – an area known as Bangsamoro or the Moro region. Some have migrated into urban and rural areas in different parts of the country, and are highly visible in and around Metro Manila (especially in the 'Muslim Town' district of Quiapo in Manila, Baclaran in Parañaque, parts of Las Piñas, and Maharlika in Pasig), Metro Cebu, Baguio and the Calabarzon region (notably in urbanized towns and cities in Cavite, Laguna, and Batangas). Most Muslim Filipinos practice Sunni Islam according to the Shafi'i school. There are some Ahmadiyya Muslims in the country.

== Freedom of religion ==
Freedom of religion in the Philippines is guaranteed by the Constitution under Section 5 of Article III (Bill of Rights), which states that "No law shall be made respecting an establishment of religion, or prohibiting the free exercise thereof. The free exercise and enjoyment of religious profession and worship, without discrimination or preference, shall forever be allowed. No religious test shall be required for the exercise of civil or political rights". In 2024, Freedom House gave the country a 4 out of 4 score for religious freedom.

== Demographics ==
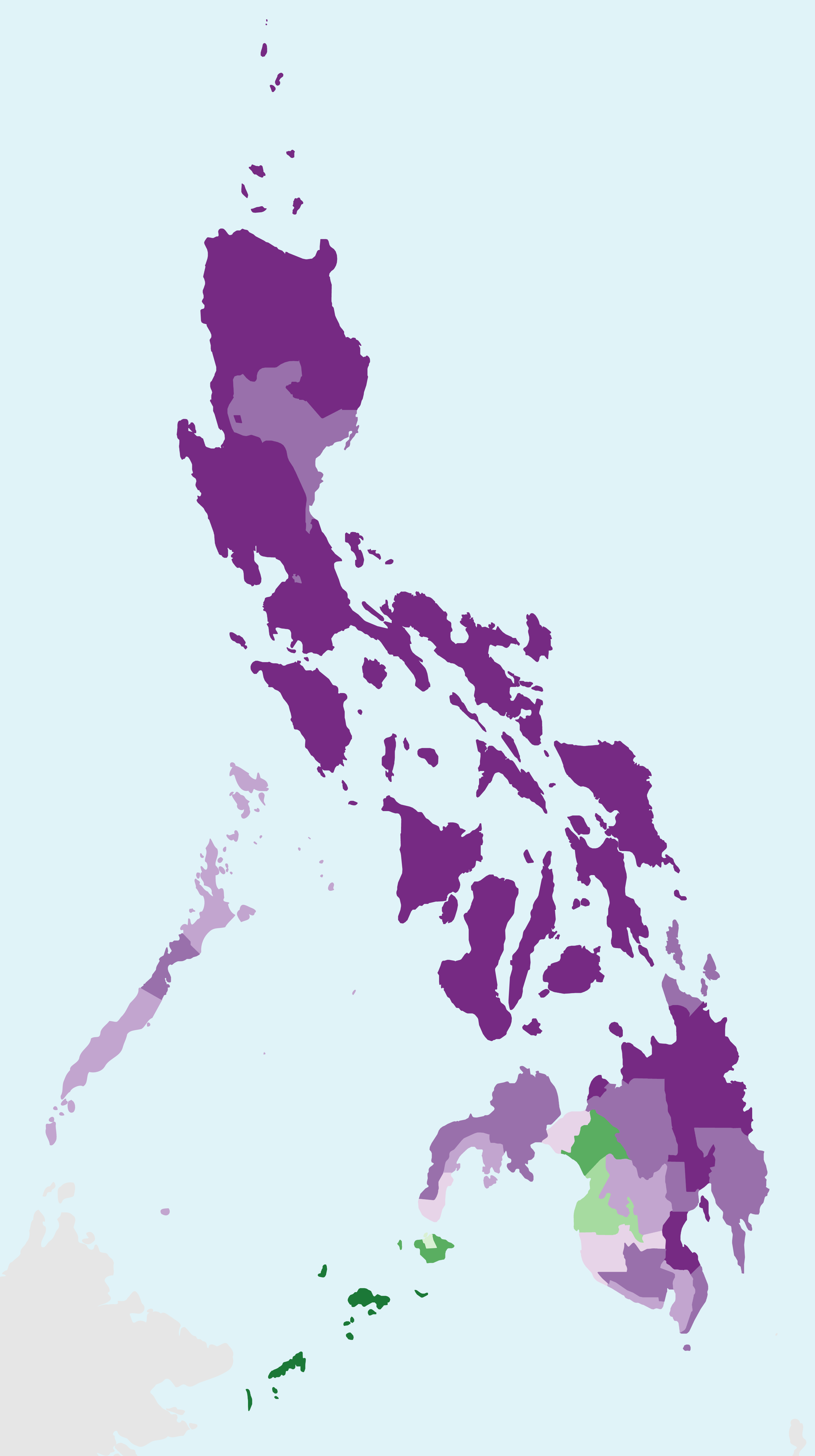
Religious majority according to the 2020 Census: Christians: / Muslims: above 50% / above 50%; above 70% / above 70%; above 85% / above 85%; above 95% / above 95%

The Philippine Statistics Authority reported in February 2023 that, based on the 2020 census, 78.81% of the total Filipino population were Catholics, 10.8%–11% were Protestants and 6.42% were Muslims.

Population by religious affiliation (2010–2020)
Affiliation	Number (2010)	Percentage (2010)	Number (2020)	Percentage (2020)
Catholic (Note: excluding Catholic Charismatic numbering 74,096 persons (0.07%))	74,211,896	80.6%	85,645,362	78.8%
Islam	5,127,084	5.6%	6,981,710	6.4%
Evangelical (PCEC-affiliated and other Evangelicals) (Note: The PCEC reports to have 55,000 churches nationwide.)	3,483,849	3.8%	5,246,914	4.8%
Protestant (NCCP-affiliated and other Protestants) (Note: Member churches of the NCCP include the Apostolic Catholic Church (Philippines), Convention of Philippine Baptist Churches, Episcopal Church in the Philippines, IEMELIF, Philippine Independent Church (Aglipay), Iglesia Unida Ekyumenikal, Lutheran Church in the Philippines, The Salvation Army, United Church of Christ in the Philippines, and the United Methodist Church.)	2,771,155	3.0%	2,995,642	2.8%
Iglesia ni Cristo (INC)	2,251,941	2.4%	2,806,524	2.6%
Seventh-day Adventist (SDA)	681,216	0.7%	862,725	0.8%
Jehovah's Witnesses (JW)	410,957	0.4%	457,245	0.4%
Church of Christ	258,176	0.3%	429,921	0.4%
Jesus is Lord Church (JILCW)	207,246	0.2%	333,506	0.3%
Tribal religion	177,417	0.2%	251,548	0.2%
Latter-day Saints	133,814	0.1%	175,004	0.2%
Other religious affiliations (including smaller churches)	2,306,657	2.5%	2,421,825	2.2%
None	73,248	0%	43,931	0%
Not reported	3,322	0%	15,186	0%
Total	92,097,978	100%	108,667,043	100%
Source: Philippine Statistics Authority

== Christianity ==
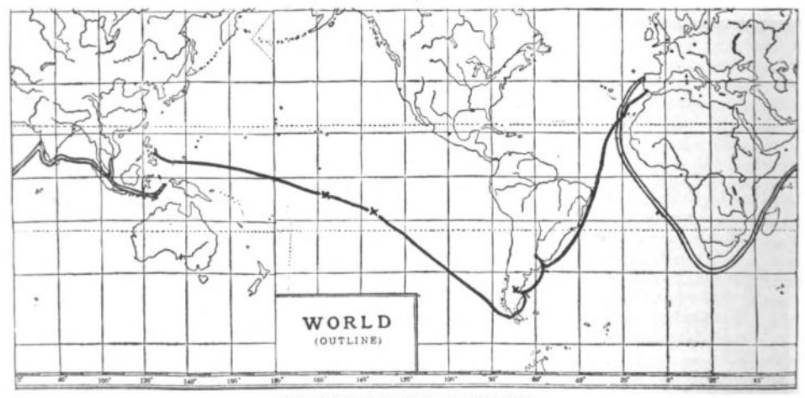
Map showing Magellan's voyages

Christianity arrived in the Philippines with the landing of Ferdinand Magellan in 1521. In 1543, Spanish explorer Ruy López de Villalobos named the archipelago Las Islas Filipinas in honor of Philip II of Spain, who was then Prince of Girona and of Asturias under his father, Charles V, Holy Roman Emperor who, as Charles I, was also King of Spain. Missionary activity during the country's colonial rule by Spain and the United States led the transformation of the Philippines into the first and then, along with East Timor, one of two predominantly Catholic nations in East Asia, with approximately 88.66% of the population belonging to the Christian faith.

=== Catholicism ===
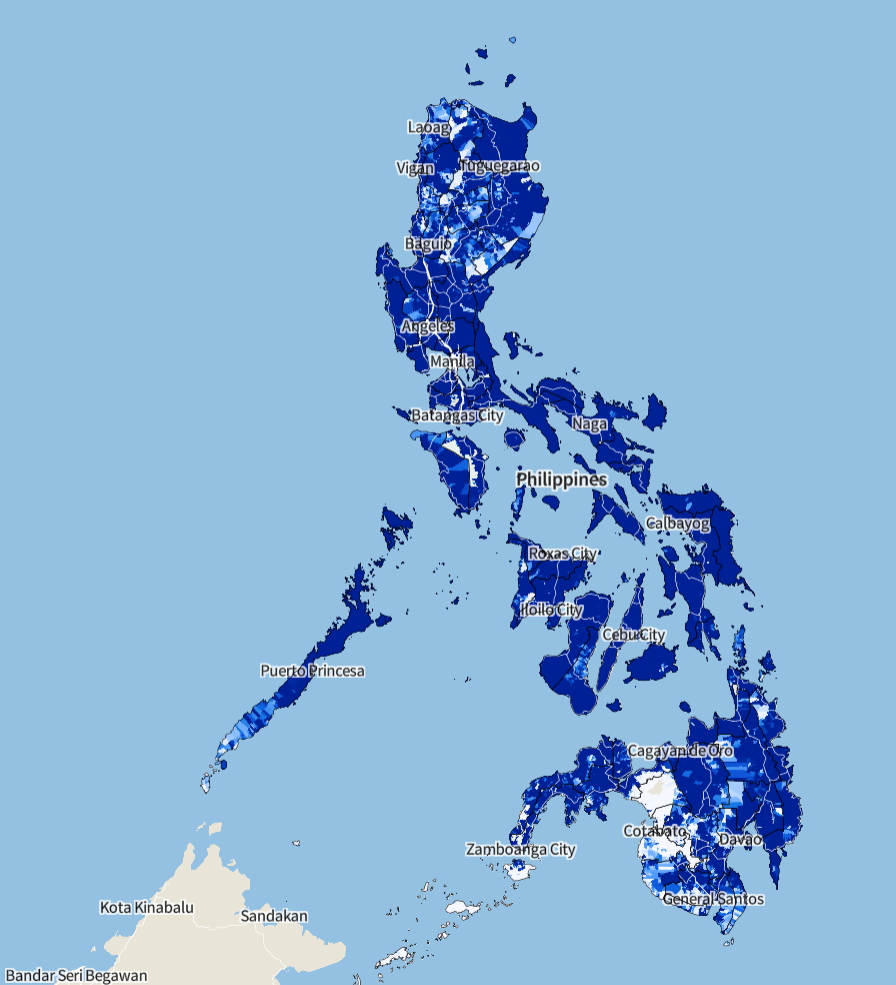
Concentration of Roman Catholics in the Philippines according to the 2020 Philippine Census per barangay level.

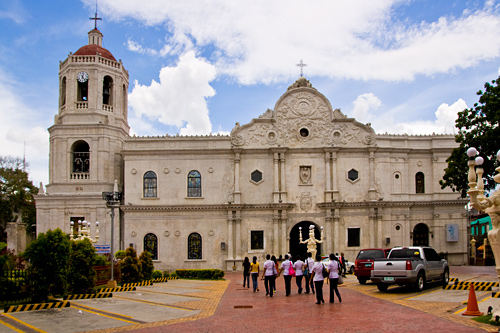
The Catholic Cebu Metropolitan Cathedral, built on the site of the Church of Saint Vitalis, the first church built in the Philippines

Catholicism (Filipino: Katolisismo; Spanish: Catolicismo) is the predominant religion and the largest Christian denomination in the Philippines comprising 78.8% of the population (or 85,645,362 million adherents) in 2020. It served as the country's state religion over most of the archipelago during the Spanish colonial period, under the Spanish Constitution of 1876. Spanish efforts to convert many on the islands were aided by the lack of a significant central authority, and by friars who learnt local languages to preach. Some traditional animistic practices blended with the new faith. Catholicism's status as state religion continued under the short-lived Malolos Republic. The American colonial government established a policy of separation of church and state, eventually ending prospects of establishing a state religion in the Philippines.

The Catholic Church has great influence on Philippine society and politics. It was instrumental in rallying public support for the bloodless People Power Revolution of 1986. Then-Archbishop of Manila and de facto Primate of the Philippines, Cardinal Jaime Sin appealed to the public via radio to congregate along Epifanio de los Santos Avenue in support of rebel forces against the dictatorship of President Ferdinand E. Marcos. Some seven million people responded to the call between February 22–25, and the non-violent protests successfully forced Marcos and his family out of power and into exile in Hawaii.

Several Catholic holidays are culturally important as family occasions, and are observed in the civil calendar. Chief among these are Christmas, which includes celebrations of the civil New Year, and the more solemn Holy Week, which may occur in March or April. Every November, Filipino families celebrate All Saints' Day and All Souls' Day as a single holiday in honour of the saints and the dead, visiting and cleaning ancestral graves, offering prayers, and feasting. As of 2018, Feast of the Immaculate Conception on December 8 was added as a special non-working holiday. The Catholic church in the Philippines is unique for being by granted by the Roman Pontiff, the Cerulean Indult, the privilege to wear the liturgical color of Cerulean or Celeste, in honor of the Immaculate Conception of Mary, a privilege, not shared by most other Latin-Rite Catholics, except those under the ambit of the Spanish Empire where it also doubly serves as the color of Native American Royalty even though the indult had initially fallen out of use due to wars of independence against Spain, the primary supporter of the Immaculate Conception, but was restored to all former Spanish-territories following the First Provincial Council of Manila as the Philippines earned it through reverting to, or staying loyal towards Catholicism, even though the church was divided on the issue of Philippine independence, amidst the schisms produced by the Philippine Independent Church as well as other break away Protestant and Masonic influenced churches, after Spanish Colonialism was replaced by the American Imperialism.

=== Philippine Independent Church ===
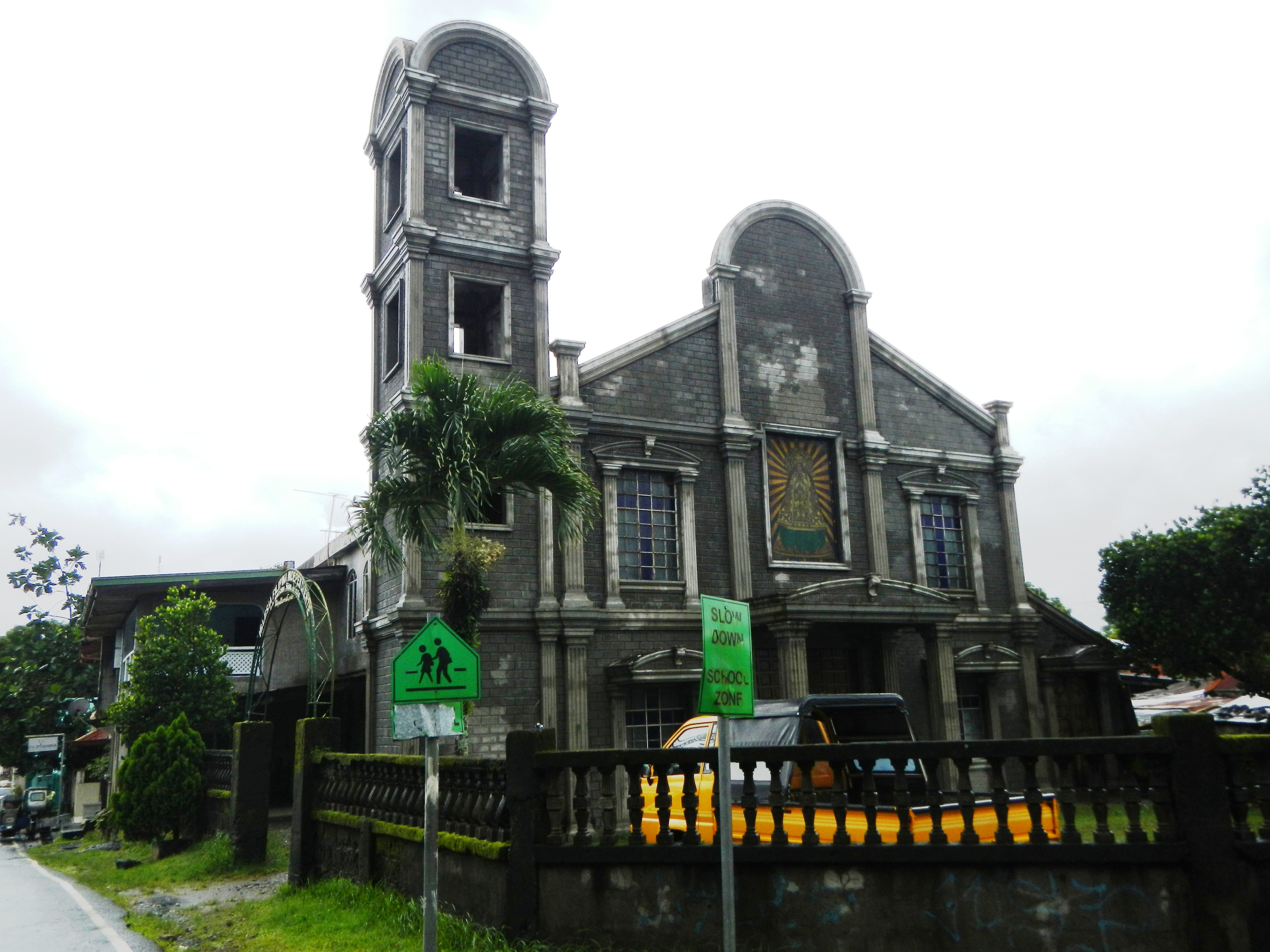
Iglesia Filipina Independiente Parish of Our Lady of Guidance in Magallanes, Cavite

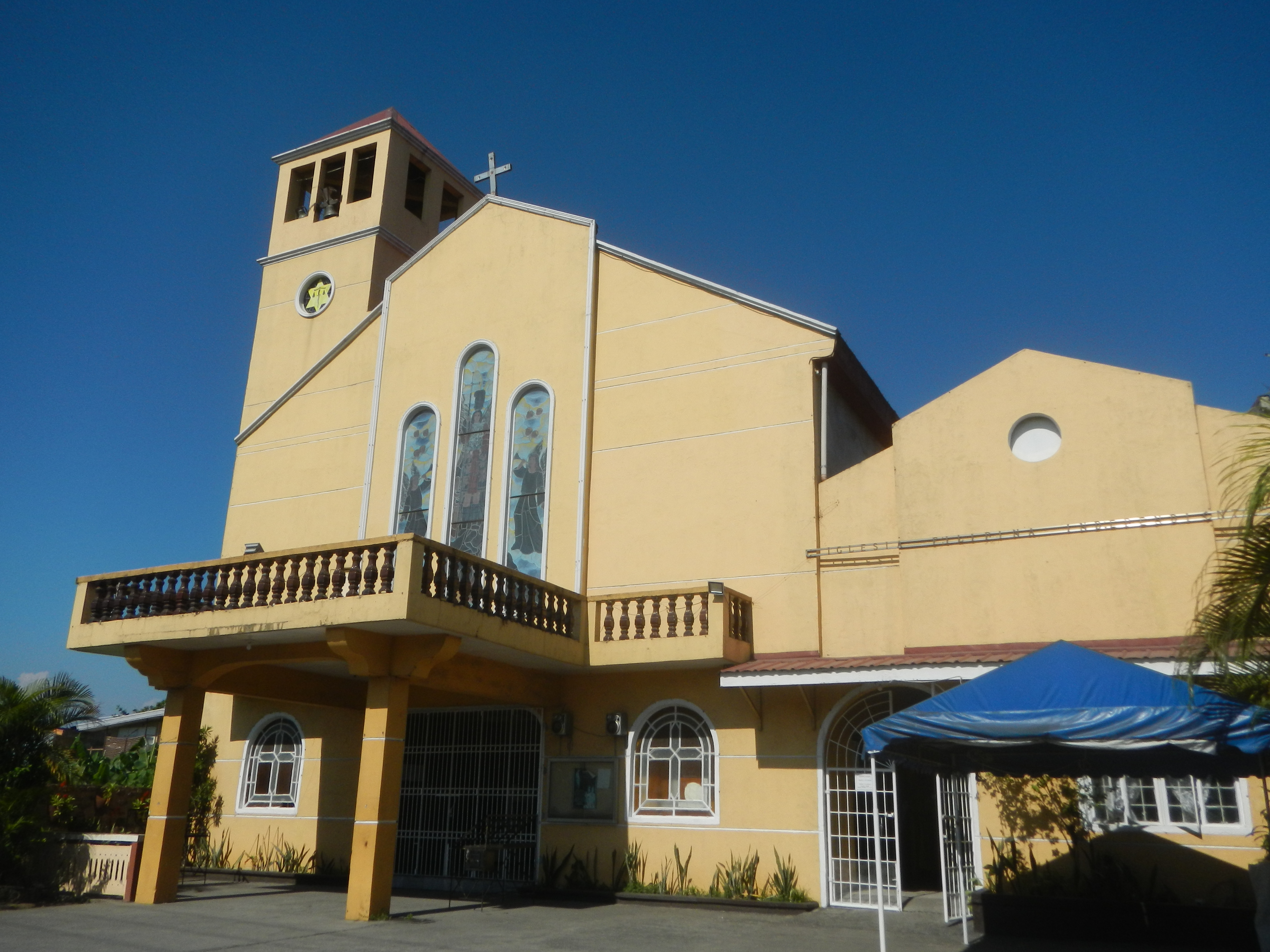
St. Michael the Archangel Parish of Binakayan of the Iglesia Filipina Independiente in Kawit

The Philippine Independent Church (officially in Philippine Spanish: Iglesia Filipina Independiente, IFI; colloquially known as the Aglipayan Church) is an independent Christian denomination in the form of a nationalist church in the Philippines. Its revolutionary nationalist schism from the Catholic Church was proclaimed in 1902 by the members of the Unión Obrera Democrática Filipina due to the mistreatment towards the Filipinos by Spanish priests and partly influenced by the execution of nationalist José Rizal under Spanish colonial rule.

Isabelo de los Reyes was one of the initiators of the separation, and suggested that former Catholic priest Gregorio Aglipay be the head of the church. It is also known as the "Aglipayan Church" after its first Obispo Maximo, Gregorio Aglipay.

Commonly shared beliefs in the Aglipayan Church are the rejection of the Apostolic Succession solely to the Petrine Papacy, the acceptance of priestly ordination of women, the free option of clerical celibacy, the tolerance to join Freemasonry groups, and the advocacy of contraception and same-sex civil rights among its members. Many saints canonised by Rome after the schism are also not officially recognised by the Aglipayan church and its members, but they recognise the popes that have been universally canonised as saints before the schism.

In 2020, the Philippine Independent Church had around 1,458,992 adherents (1.4% of the Philippine population). Aglipayans in the Philippines claim to number at least 6 to 8 million members, with most from the northern part of Luzon, especially in the Ilocos Region and in the parts of Visayas like Antique, Iloilo and Guimaras provinces. Congregations are also found throughout the Philippine diaspora in North America, Europe, Middle East and Asia. With the exception of the Unitarian Iglesia ni Cristo, the church is the second-largest single Christian denomination in the country after the Catholic Church (some 80.2% of the population). It has 48 dioceses plus the 2 dioceses outside the Philippines such as the Diocese of Tampa (USA) and the Diocese of Western USA, Western Canada, and the Pacific Islands. It has Fellowship congregations in the United Kingdom, United Arab Emirates, Hong Kong and Singapore. IFI is in full communion with the Anglican Churches and The Episcopal Church.

=== Iglesia ni Cristo ===
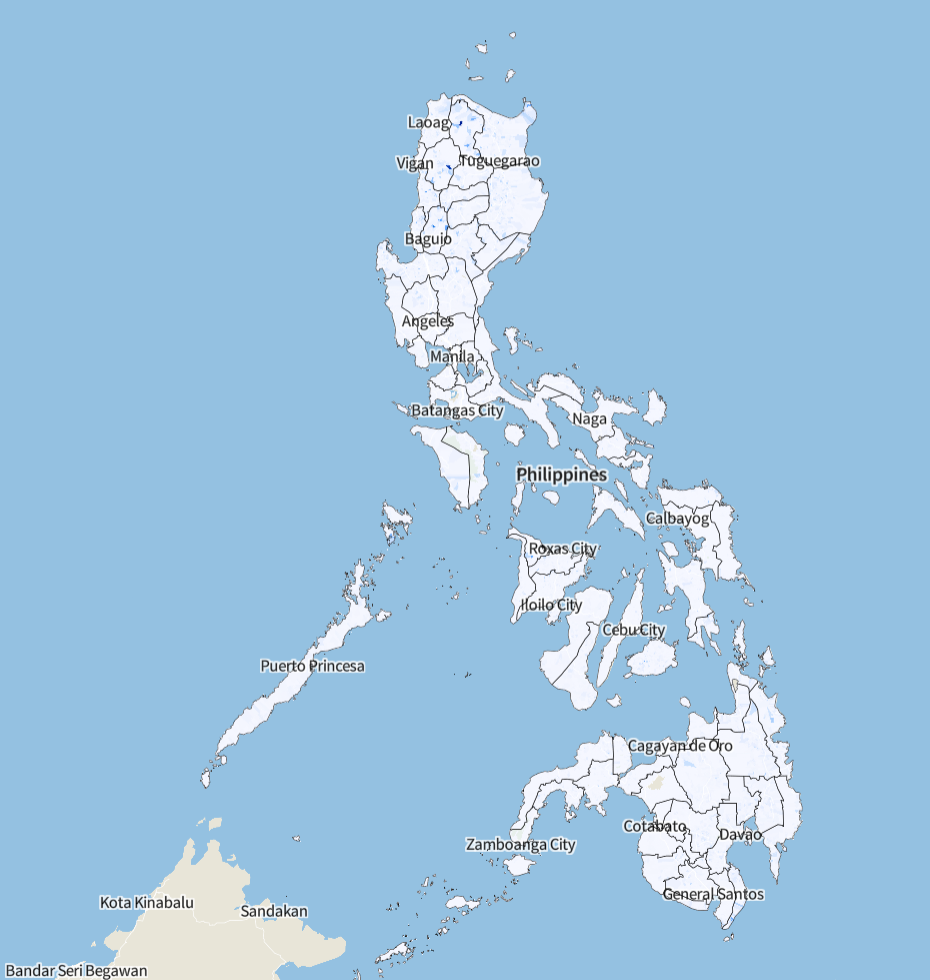
Concentration of Iglesia Ni Cristo members in the Philippines according to the 2020 Philippine Census per barangay level.

Iglesia ni Cristo's central temple in Quezon City

Iglesia ni Cristo (English: Church of Christ; Spanish: Iglesia de Cristo) is the largest entirely locally initiated religious organisation in the Philippines comprising roughly 2.6% of religious affiliation in the country. Felix Y. Manalo officially registered the church with the Philippine Government on July 13, 1914 and because of this, most publications refer to him as the founder of the church. Felix Manalo claimed that he was restoring the church of Christ that was lost for 2,000 years. He died on April 12, 1963, aged 76.

The Iglesia ni Cristo is known for its large evangelical missions. The largest of which was the Grand Evangelical Mission (GEM) which also occurred simultaneously on 19 sites across the country. In Manila site alone, more than 600,000 people attended the event. Other programs includes the Lingap sa Mamamayan (Aid to Humanity), The Kabayan Ko Kapatid Ko (My Countrymen, My Brethren) and various resettlement projects for affected individuals. The church has been embroiled in corruption scandals, as well as allegations of illegal detentions in 2015, leading to widespread protests. Issues about the idolization of the group's founder and the church establishment over the Bible have also surfaced, as well as the outcasting of members who question the leaders of the church.

Demographics of the Iglesia Ni Cristo (as of 2025)
Region	Congregations	Average per ecclesiastical district	House churches, group worship services (GWS), and church extensions (Ext.)	Average per ecclesiastical district	Total (congregations and groups)	Percent share of all INC congregations
Africa	45	15	85	28.3	130	0.8%
Americas	434	12.8	192	5.6	626	7.3%
Asia	129	12.9	65	6.5	194	2.2%
Europe	99	9.9	119	11.9	218	1.6%
Oceania	98	16.3	73	12.2	171	1.6%
Philippines	5163	39.1	2181	16.5	7344	86.5%

=== Jehovah's Witnesses ===
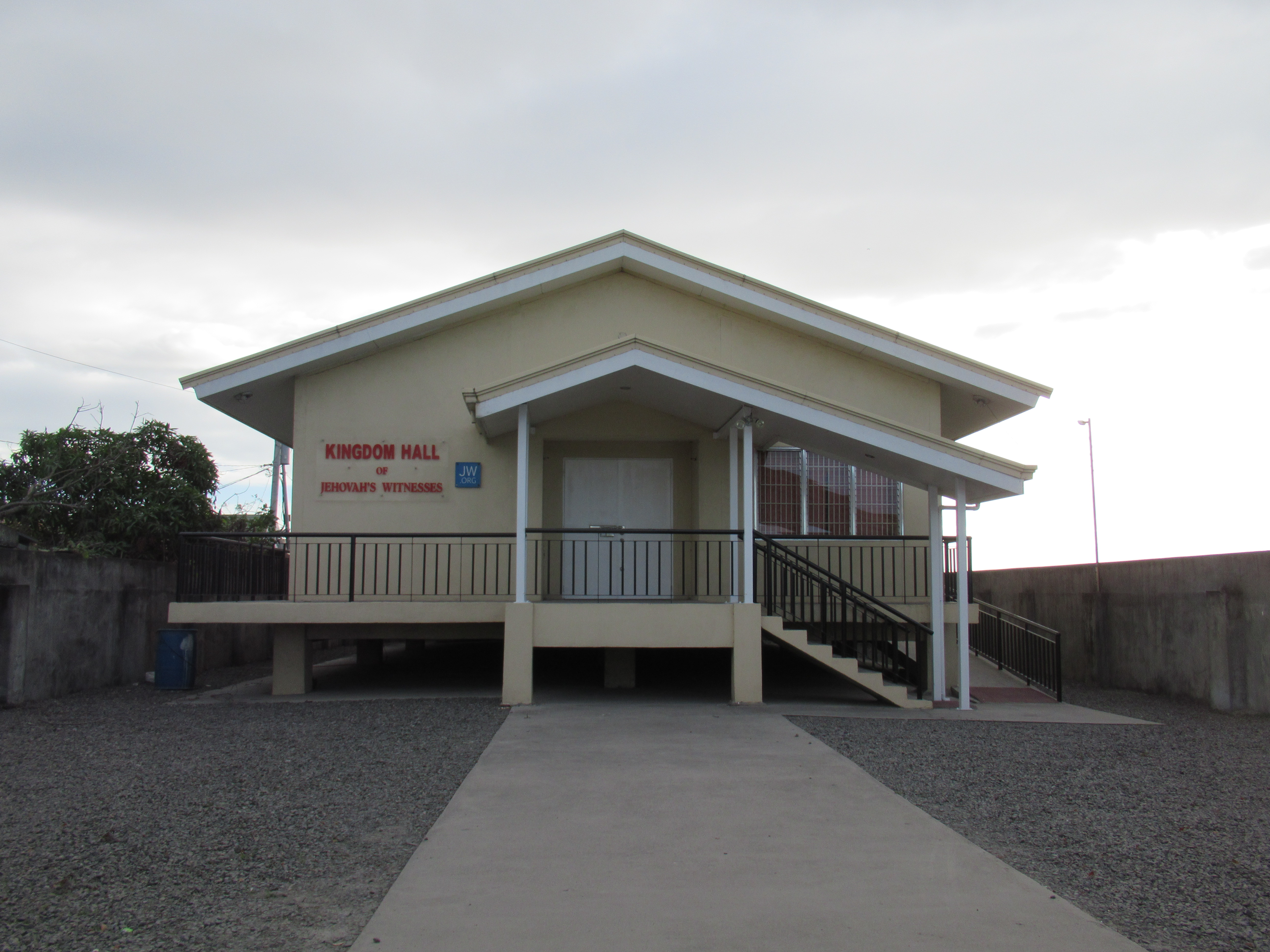
Kingdom Hall of Jehovah's Witnesses in Minalin, Pampanga

The Jehovah’s Witnesses (Filipino: Saksi ni Jehova) are well known in the Philippines for their door-to-door ministry, public witnessing campaigns, free magazines known as “Awake!” and “the Watchtower” translated into local languages like Cebuano, Hiligaynon, Abaknon, Iloko, Tagalog, and 19 other local dialects.

=== Seventh-day Adventist Church ===
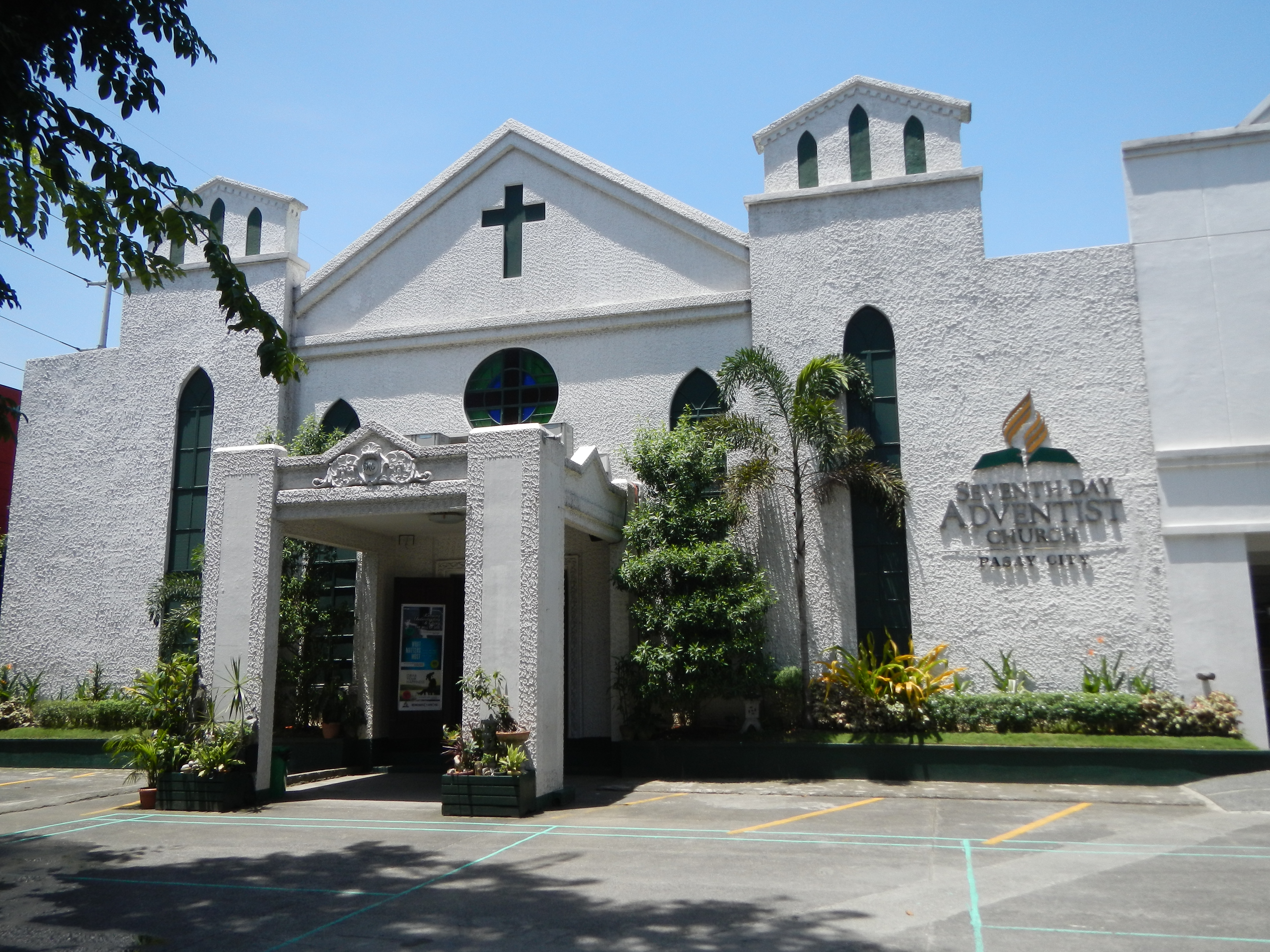
Seventh-day Adventist Church in Pasay

The Seventh-day Adventist Church (Filipino: Simbahan ng Ikapitong-araw na Adbentista; Spanish: Iglesia Adventista del Septimo Dia) is the fourth largest Christian denomination and fifth largest religious affiliation in the Philippines, behind Philippine Independent Church or Aglipay. The church was established in the Philippines in 1905. Robert Caldwell, a literature evangelist missionary, arrived in Manila on August 24 of that year and pioneered the literature ministry by selling books in the language people understand – Spanish. People bought books and spread the word to their friends. In 1906, the Philippine Mission was organized under the Asiatic Division with headquarters located in Shanghai, China.

Colloquially called Sabadístas by outsiders, Filipino Adventists numbered 862,725 as of 2020 with an annual membership growth rate of 5.6%. As of 2022, the Seventh-day Adventist Church has 5,358 churches in the Philippines. Numerous primary and secondary schools, colleges, and universities—notably, the Adventist University of the Philippines and Adventist International Institute of Advance Studies–were established to provide education to students as well as to assist in preaching and evangelization of the church in different parts of the country.

=== Jesus Miracle Crusade International Ministry ===
The Jesus Miracle Crusade International Ministry (JMCIM) is an apostolic Pentecostal religious group from the Philippines which believes in the gospel of Jesus Christ with signs, wonders, miracles and faith in God for healing. JMCIM was founded by evangelist Wilde E. Almeda on February 14, 1975.

=== Members Church of God International ===
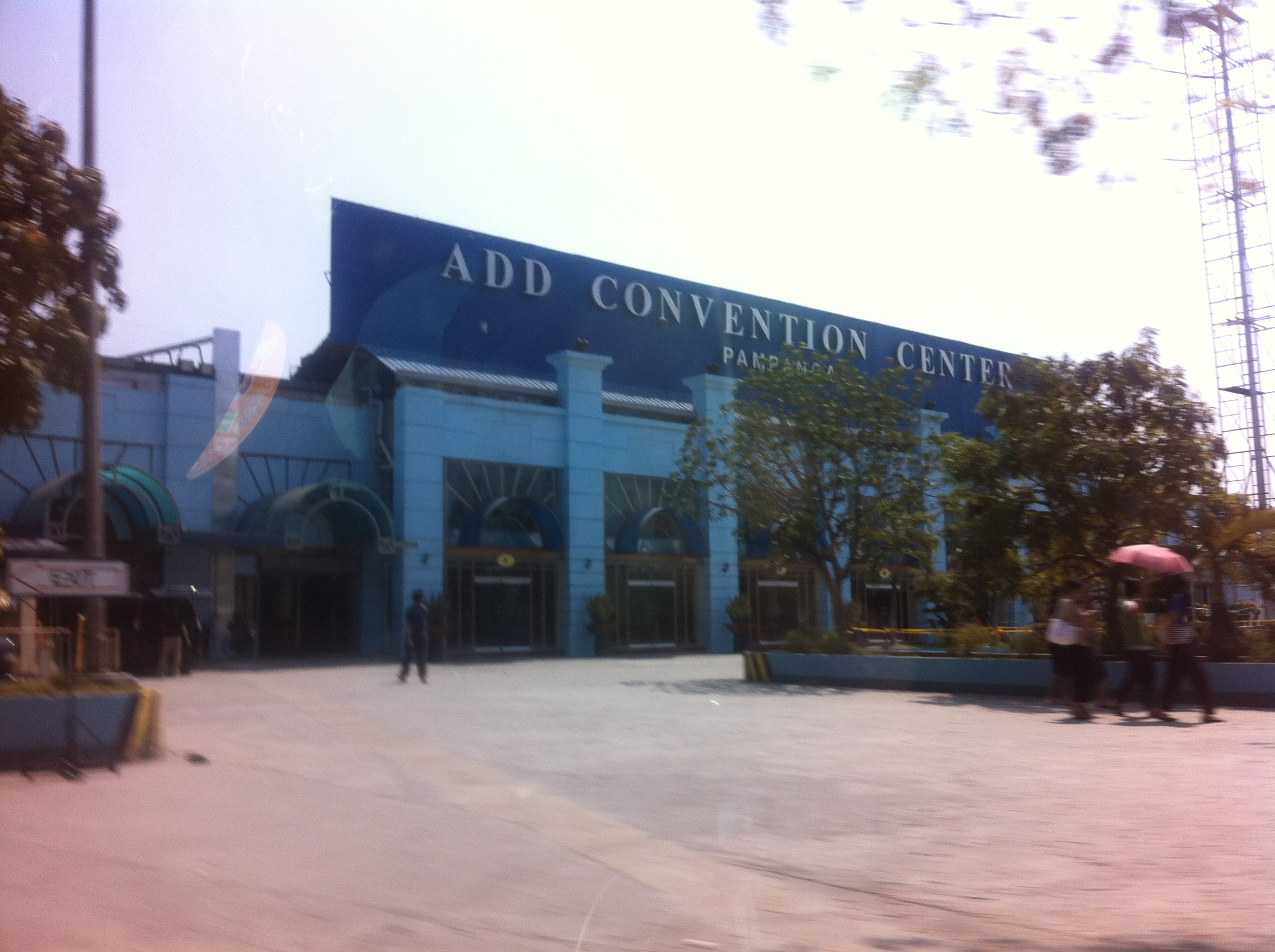
Ang Dating Daan Convention Center in Apalit, Pampanga

Members Church of God International (MCGI, Filipino: Mga Kaanib sa Iglesia ng Dios Internasyonal) is a religious organization popularly known through its Filipino television program, Ang Dating Daan (English Program "The Old Path"; in Spanish El Camino Antiguo; in Portuguese O Caminho Antigo). MCGI are one of the Christian majority in the Philippines with more than a million members internationally.

The church is known for their "Bible Expositions", where guests and members are given a chance to ask any biblical question to the "Overall Servant" Eliseo Soriano. He and his associates refute teachings of asked religions which are, according to Soriano, "not biblical" and discuss controversial passages. Besides general preaching, they also established charity works. Among these humanitarian services are The Legacy Continues Wish granting activity, MCGI Free Store, Free Meal and Free Potable Water; charity homes for the senior citizens and orphaned children and teenagers; transient homes; medical missions; full college scholarship; start-up capital for livelihood projects; vocational training for the disabled; free legal assistance; free bus, jeepney, and train rides for commuters and senior citizens, and; free Bibles for everyone. MCGI is now one of the major blood donor in the Philippines, as acknowledged and awarded by the Philippine National Red Cross' Jose Rizal Award, the highest honor given by PNRC.

=== Most Holy Church of God in Christ Jesus ===
The Most Holy Church of God in Christ Jesus (Filipino: Kabanalbanalang Iglesia ng Dios kay Kristo Hesus), is an independent Christian denomination officially registered in the Philippines by Teofilo D. Ora in May 1922. The church claims to restore the visible church founded in Jerusalem by Christ Jesus. It has spread to areas including California, Calgary, Dubai, and other Asian countries. According to the 2020 census, the church had 9,585 members in the Philippines.

The church was founded by Bishop Teofilo D. Ora in 1922. He, along with Avelino Santiago and Nicolas Perez, split off from the Iglesia ni Cristo (Church of Christ) in 1921. They initially called their church Iglesia Verdadera de Cristo Hesus (True Church of Christ Jesus). However, following a religious doctrine controversy, Nicolas Perez split off from the group and registered an offshoot called Iglesia ng Dios kay Kristo Hesus, Haligi at Suhay ng Katotohanan (Church of God in Christ Jesus, the Pillar and Support of the Truth). Teofilo D. Ora was bishop until his death in 1969. He was officially succeeded by Bishop Salvador C. Payawal who led the church until 1989. Subsequent bishops were Bishop Gamaliel T. Payawal (1989 to 2003) and Bishop Isagani N. Capistrano (2003–present). It was during Gamaliel Payawal's tenure when the church was renamed as Most Holy Church of God in Christ Jesus.

=== Apostolic Catholic Church ===
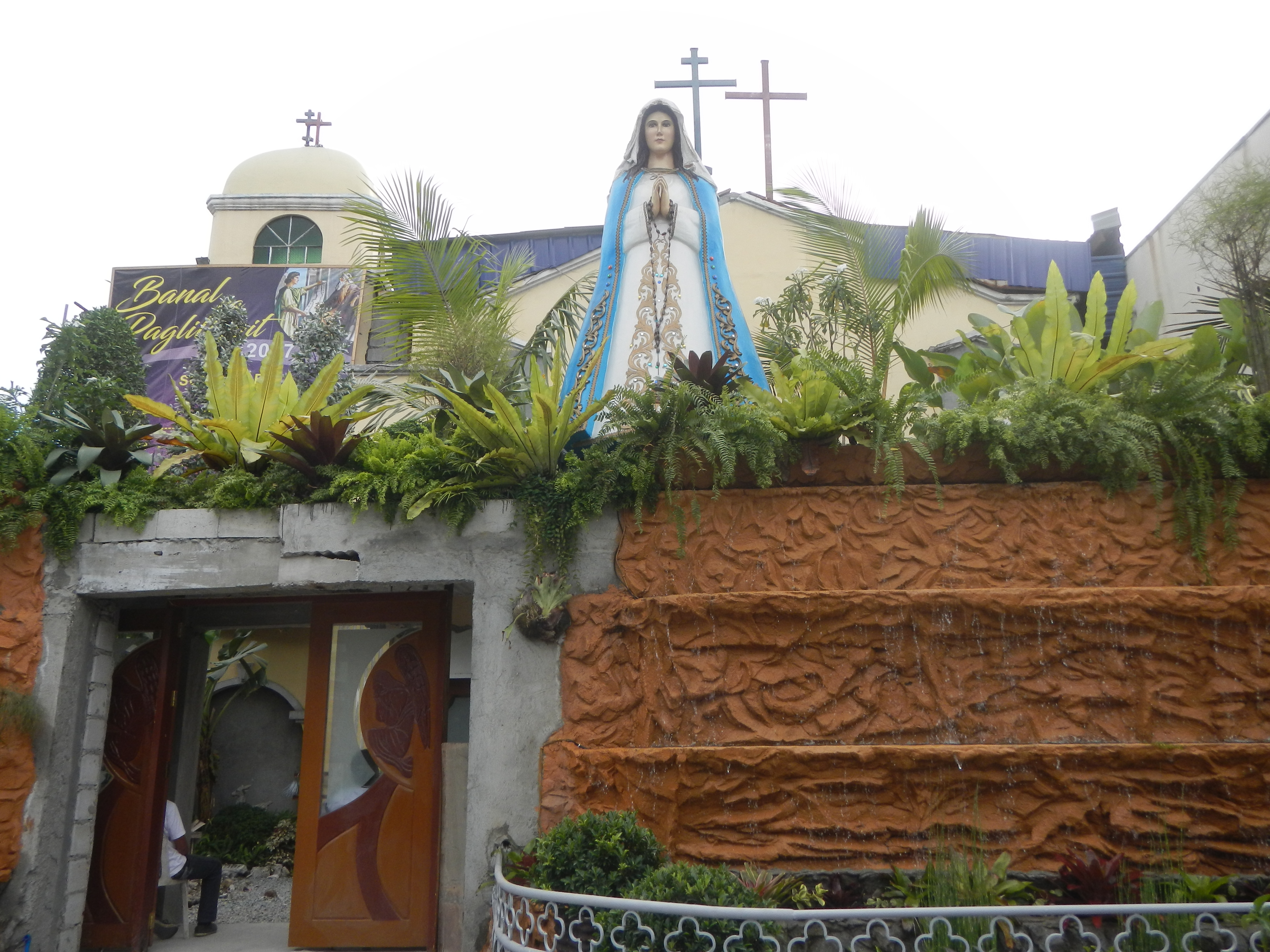
National Shrine of Ina Poon Bato in EDSA, Quezon City

Apostolic Catholic Church (ACC; Filipino: Apostolika't Katolikang Simbahan) is an Independent Catholic denomination established in 1992 by John Florentine L. Teruel. The church started as a mainstream Catholic lay organization that was founded in Hermosa, Bataan in the early 1970s by Maria Virginia P. Leonzon Vda. De Teruel. In 1991 the organisation and the Catholic Church had a schism; due to varying issues, it formally separated itself from the Catholic Church, when John Florentine Teruel was consecrated as a patriarch and registered the church as a Protestant and Independent Catholic denomination.

As of 2020, the Apostolic Catholic Church has 54,543 members in the Philippines. The National Council of Churches in the Philippines reports that the Apostolic Catholic Church has more than 5 million members worldwide. The largest international congregations are in Japan, United States and Canada.

=== Eastern Orthodoxy ===
Eastern Orthodoxy has been continuously present in the Philippines for more than 200 years. Today, Eastern Orthodoxy in the Philippines is represented by several ecclesiastical jurisdictions, including the Russian Orthodox Church, the Ecumenical Patriarchate of Constantinople through the Exarchate of the Philippines (under the Orthodox Metropolitanate of Hong Kong and Southeast Asia), and the Antiochian Orthodox Church through the Antiochian Orthodox Christian Mission in the Philippines (under the Antiochian Orthodox Archdiocese of Australia, New Zealand, and All Oceania). There are an estimated 2,500 Eastern Orthodox Christians living in the country.

=== Protestantism ===
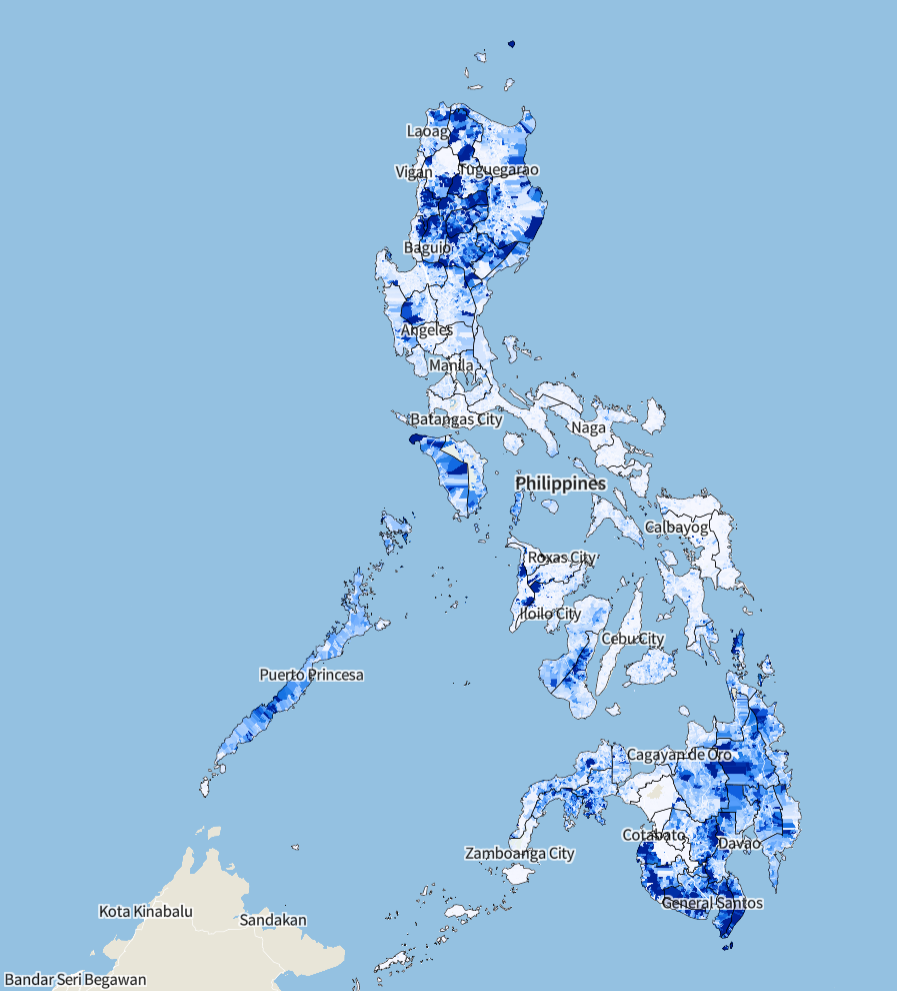
Concentration of Protestants and Evangelicals in the Philippines according to the 2020 Philippine Census per barangay level.

The Every Nation Building in the Philippines completed its first phase in 2003, while the second phase was completed in 2015. It also serves as the central office of Victory Christian Fellowship, one of Every Nation's founding members.

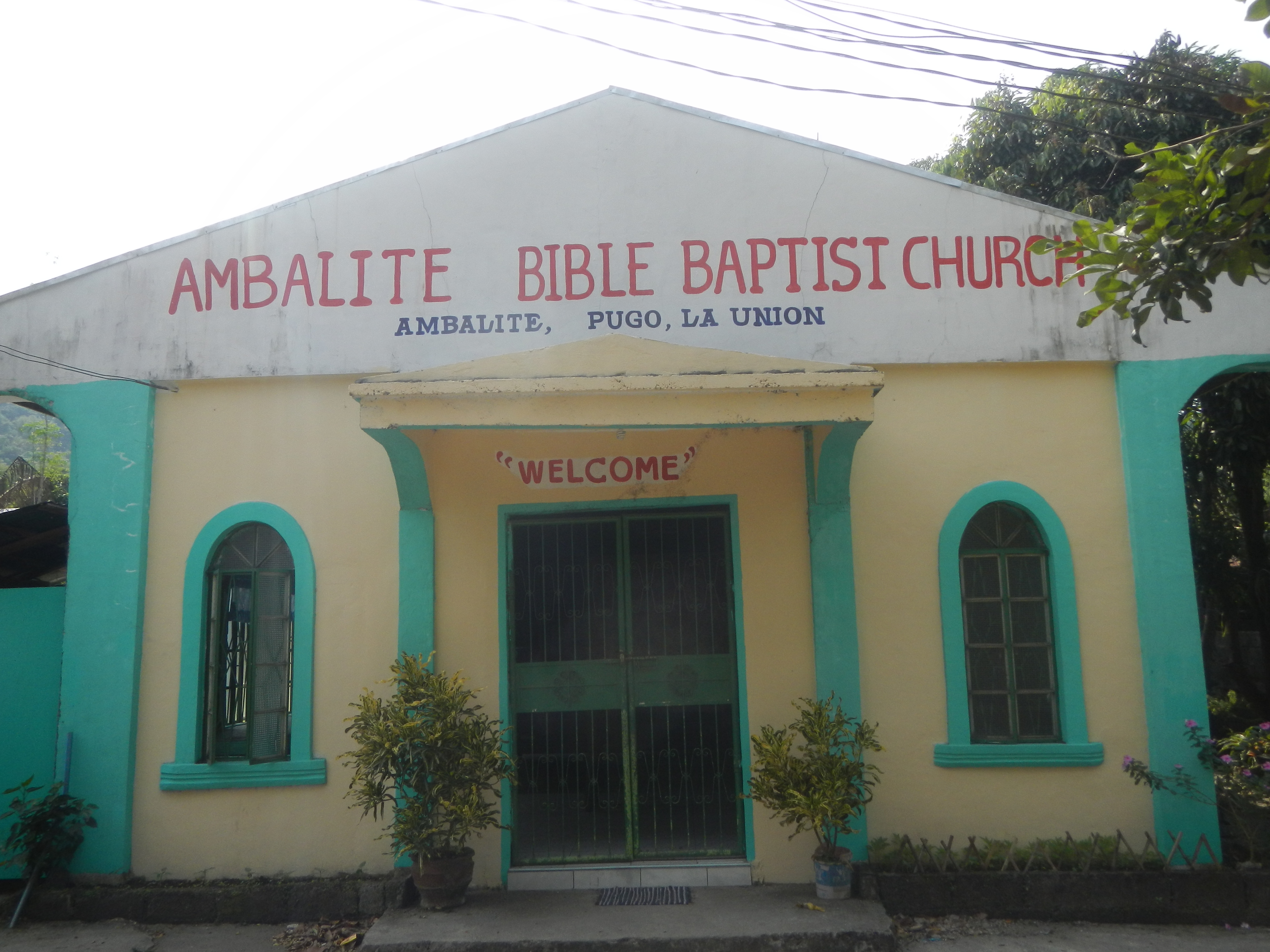
Bible Baptist Church in Pugo, La Union

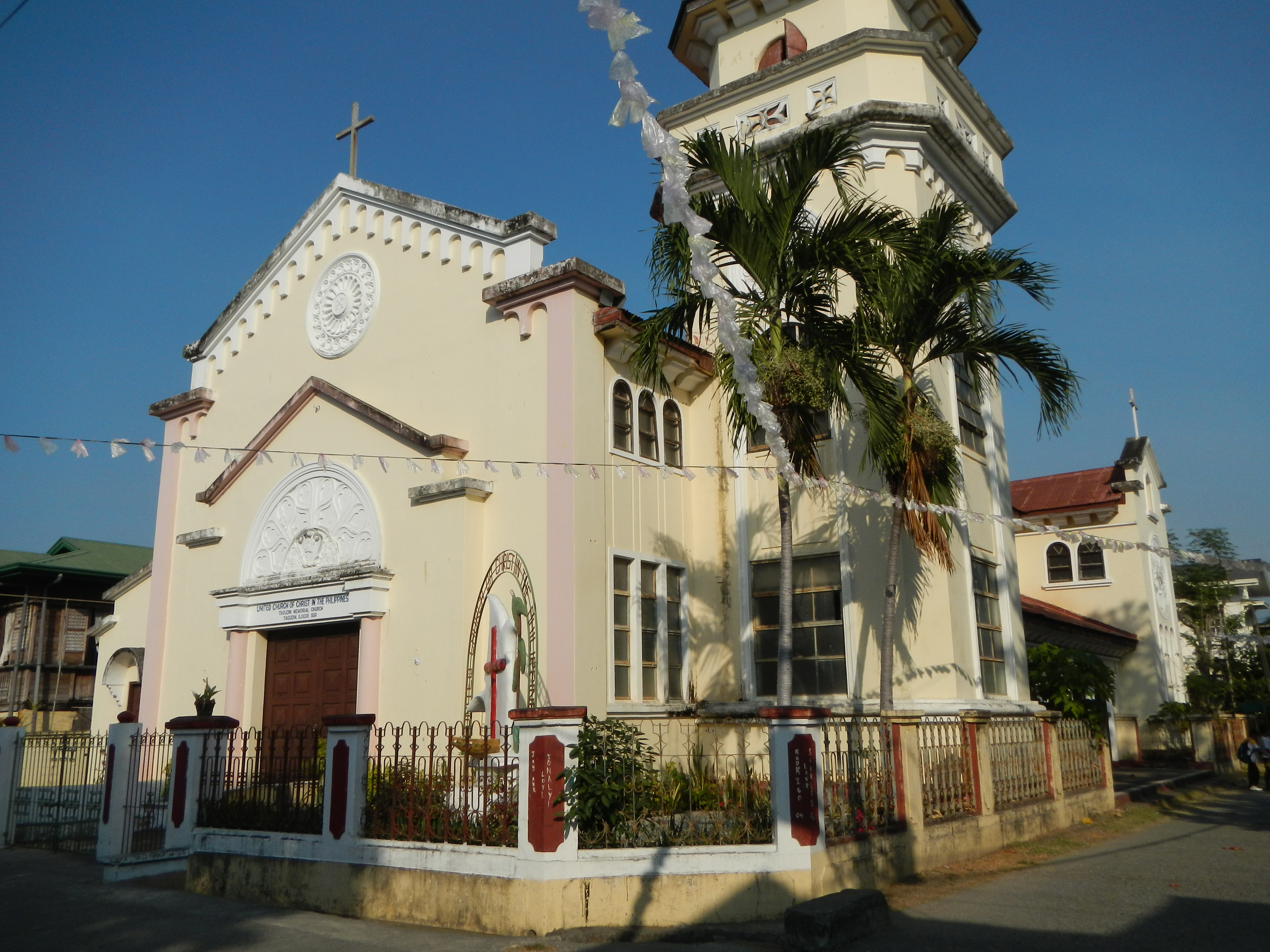
UCCP Memorial Church in Tagudin, Ilocos Sur

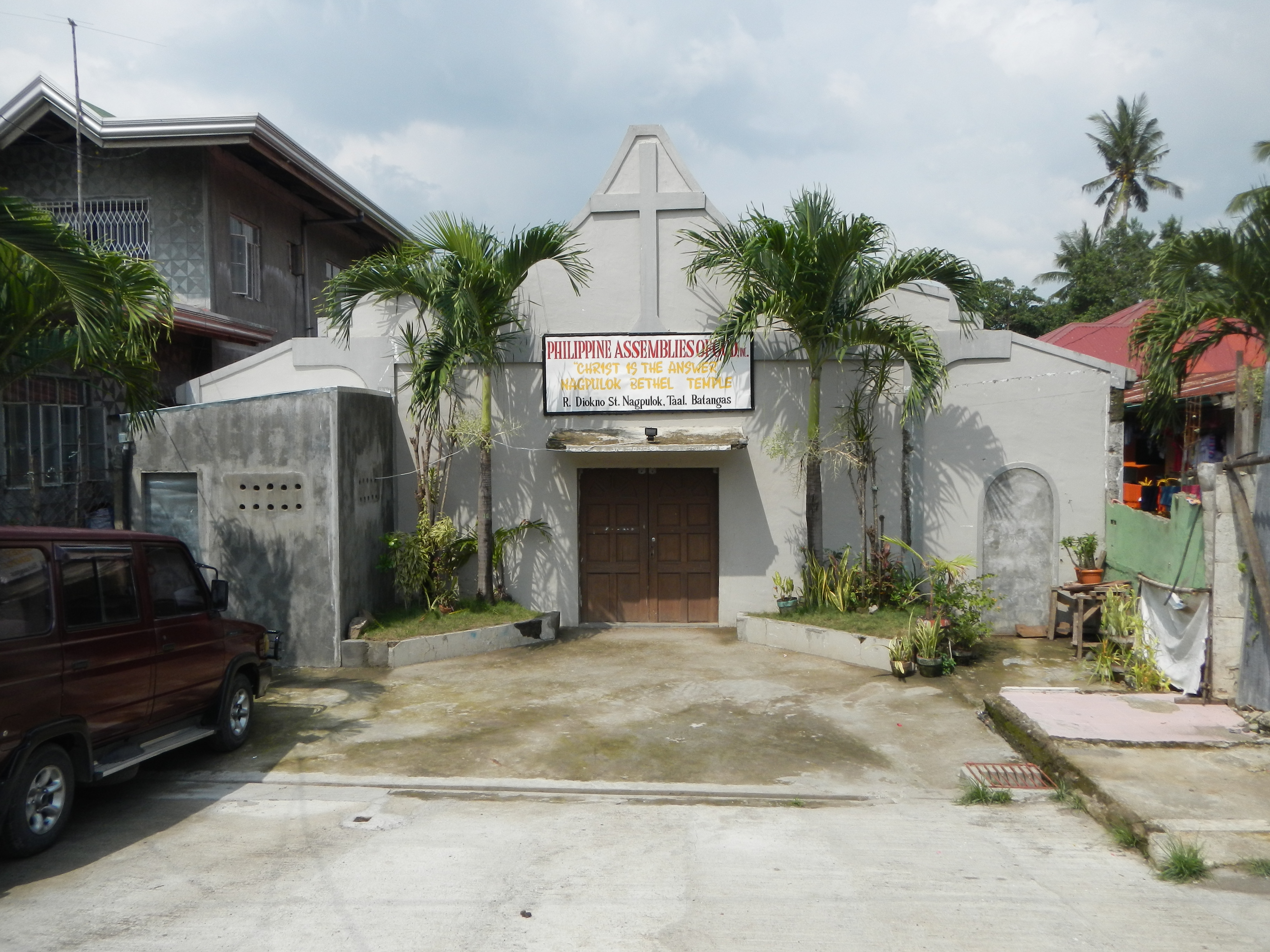
Philippine Assemblies of God in Taal, Batangas

Protestantism arrived in the Philippines with the take-over of the islands by Americans at the turn of the 20th century. In 1898, Spain lost the Philippines to the United States. After a bitter fight for independence against its new occupiers, Filipinos surrendered and were again colonized. The arrival of Protestant American missionaries soon followed. As of 2015, Protestants comprised about 10%–15% of the population, with an annual growth rate of 10% since 1910 and constitute the largest Christian grouping after Catholicism. Protestants were 10.8% of the population in 2010. Protestant church organizations established in the Philippines during the 20th century include the following:

- Ang Iglesia Metodista sa Pilipinas (Methodist)
- Association of Fundamental Baptist Churches in the Philippines (Baptist/Evangelical)
- Awake International Ministries (Evangelical)
- Baptist Bible Fellowship in the Philippines (Baptist/Evangelical)
- Bread of Life Ministries International (Evangelical)
- Cathedral of Praise (Pentecostal)
- Christ's Commission Fellowship (Evangelical)
- Christ Living Epistle Ministries Inc. (Full Gospel/Pentecostal)
- Christian and Missionary Alliance Churches of the Philippines
- Church of God (Cleveland, Tennessee)
- Church of God in Christ (Memphis, Tennessee)
- Church of the Foursquare Gospel in the Philippines (Full Gospel/Pentecostal)
- Church of the Nazarene (Holiness movement)
- Citichurch Cebu (Pentecostal)
- City of God Celebration Church (Pentecostal)
- Conservative Baptist Association of the Philippines (Baptist)
- Convention in Visayas and Mindanao of Southern Baptist Churches (Baptist)
- Convention of Philippine Baptist Churches (Baptist)
- Day by Day Christian Ministries (Evangelical)
- Episcopal Church in the Philippines (Anglican)
- Every Nation Churches and Ministries (Pentecostal/Evangelical)
- God's Sufficient Grace Ministries (Cebu) (Evangelical)
- Grace Christian Church of the Philippines
- Greenhills Christian Fellowship (Conservative Baptist)
- Heartland Covenant Church (formerly Jesus Cares Ministries)
- His Life Ministries (Non-Denominational)
- His Life City Church (Pentecostal)
- Iglesia Evangelica Metodista en las Islas Filipinas
- Iglesia Evangelica Unida de Cristo
- Jesus Flock Gateway Church (Full Gospel)
- Jesus Is Lord Church Worldwide (Full Gospel)
- Jesus Miracle Crusade International Ministry (Full Gospel)
- Jesus the Anointed One Church (Pentecostal)
- Jesus the Blessed Redeemer International Ministry (JBRIM)
- Lutheran Church in the Philippines (Lutheran)
- Living Word Christian Churches of Cebu International, Inc. (Evangelical)
- Luzon Convention of Southern Baptist Churches (Baptist)
- New Life Christian Center (Pentecostal)
- Pentecostal Global Ministries Full Gospel Church (Pentecostal)
- Pentecostal Missionary Church of Christ (4th Watch) (Pentecostal)
- Philippine Evangelical Holiness Churches
- Philippines General Council of the Assemblies of God
- Presbyterian Church of the Philippines
- Redeeming Grace Christian Centre
- Seventh-day Adventist Church
- The Salvation Army
- TEAM Ministries international
- The Blessed Word International Church (Evangelical)
- The United Methodist Church (Methodist)
- Union Church Manila
- Union Espiritista Cristiana de Filipinas (established on 1905)
- United Church of Christ in the Philippines (Congregationalist, Presbyterian, Disciples, United Brethren, Methodist)
- United Evangelical Church of the Philippines
- United Methodist Church
- Victory Christian Fellowship (Evangelical)
- Vineyard Christian Fellowship (Evangelical)
- Word for the World Christian Fellowship (Evangelical)
- Word of Life World Mission Church (Pentecostal)
- Words of Life Christian Ministries

=== The Church of Jesus Christ of Latter-day Saints ===
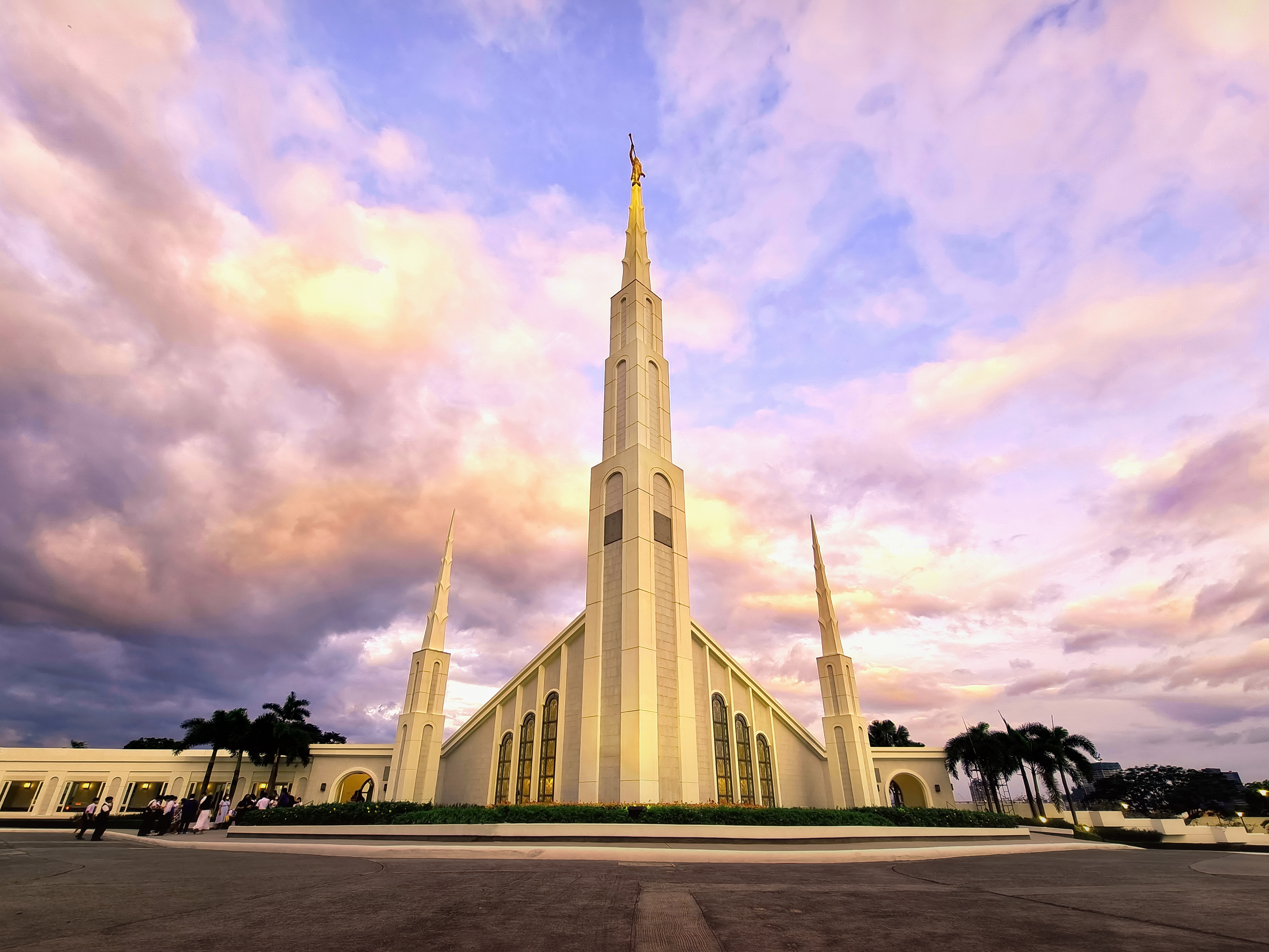
Manila Philippines Temple in 2022

The Church of Jesus Christ of Latter-day Saints in the Philippines was founded during the Spanish-American War in 1898. Two men from Utah who were members of the United States artillery battery, and who were also set apart as missionaries by the Church before they left the United States, preached while stationed in the Philippines. Missionary work picked up after World War II, and in 1961 the Church was officially registered in the Philippines. In 1969, the Church had spread to eight major islands and had the highest number of baptisms of any area in the Church. Membership according to the church was 905,082 in 2026; the 2020 census counted 175,004. A temple was built in 1984 in Manila. A second temple was completed in Cebu City in 2010, followed by a third temple in Urdaneta City in 2024. By 2026, the number of temples had doubled to six with the opening of temples in Alabang, Davao, and Bacolod. As of 2026, a total of 14 temples were either operating, under construction, or announced within the country.

=== Other Christians ===
- The Bible Student movement, from which Jehovah's Witnesses later developed, was introduced to the Philippines in 1912, when the president of the Watch Tower Society, Charles Taze Russell, gave a talk at the former Manila Grand Opera House. In 1993, a Supreme Court case involving the Witnesses resulted in the reversal of an earlier 1959 Supreme Court decision and in upholding "the right of children of Jehovah's Witnesses to refrain from saluting the flag, reciting the pledge of allegiance, and singing the national anthem." As of 2021, there were officially 235,736 active members in the Philippines in 3,504 congregations nationwide. Their 2021 observance of the annual Memorial of Christ's death attracted an attendance of 739,439 in the country.
- The Kingdom of Jesus Christ, the Name Above Every Name was founded by pastor Apollo C. Quiboloy on September 1, 1985. Quiboloy claims to be the "Appointed" Son of God, that salvation is through him, that he is the residence of the God the Father and that he restores the Kingdom of God in the gentile settings.
- United Pentecostal Church International (Oneness) originated in the United States as an offshoot of the Pentecostal movements in the 1920s. The church is a proponent of the belief of modalism to describe God, and is non-trinitarian in its conception of God.
- Jesus Christ To God be the Glory (Friends Again) was founded by Luis Ruíz Santos in 1988.
- Churches of Christ (Churches of Christ 33 AD/the Stone-Campbellites) is a restorationist movement that distinctly believes in a set of steps or ways to attain salvation, among of which is prerequisite immersion baptism.
- Loyal Singles for Jesus Ministry, founded by EJ Tingey in 2018. He claims that true salvation is achieved by being loyal to God and women.
- True Jesus Church a "oneness" movement that started in the People's Republic of China.
- Jesus is Our Shield Worldwide Ministries (commonly known as Oras ng Himala, "Hour of Miracle[s]") was founded by Renato D. Carillo, who claims to be the end-times apostle.
- Universal Church of the Kingdom of God (UCKG Help Center) was founded by Edir Macedo in 1977 in Brazil.
- Unification Church, founded by Sun Myung Moon in what is today South Korea.

== Other Abrahamic religions ==
=== Islam ===
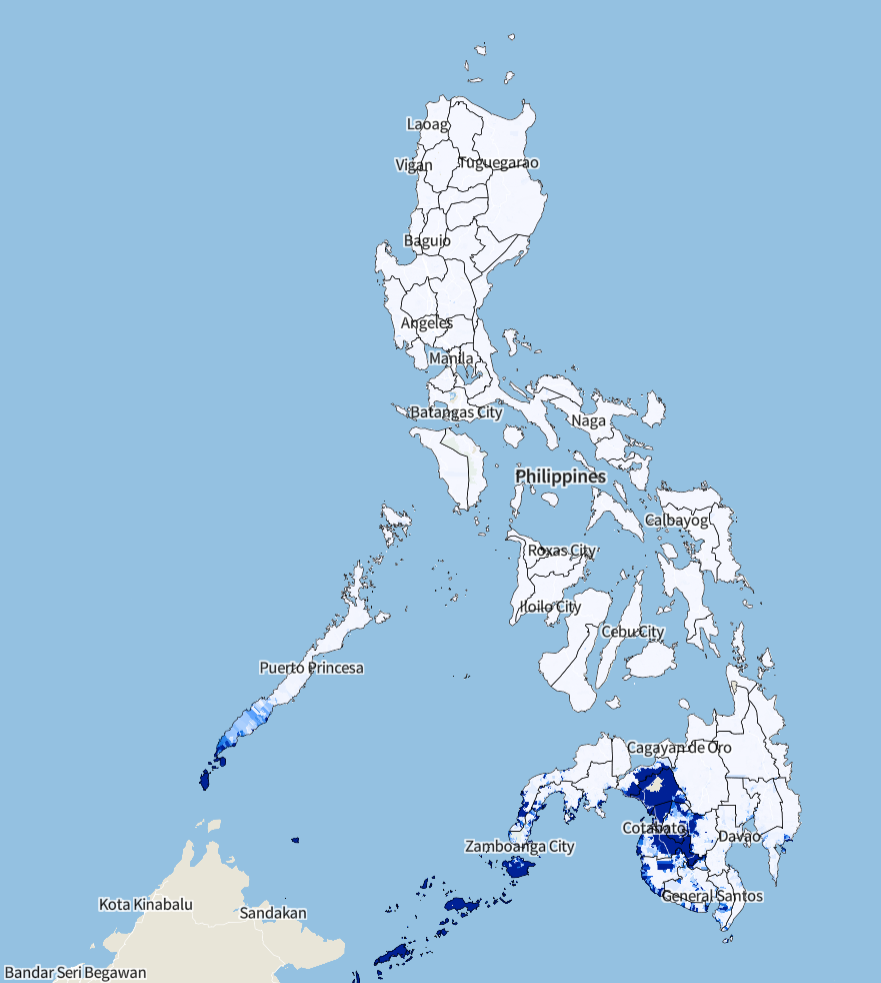
Concentration of Muslims in the Philippines according to the 2020 Philippine Census per barangay level.

Sultan Haji Hassanal Bolkiah Mosque in Cotabato City

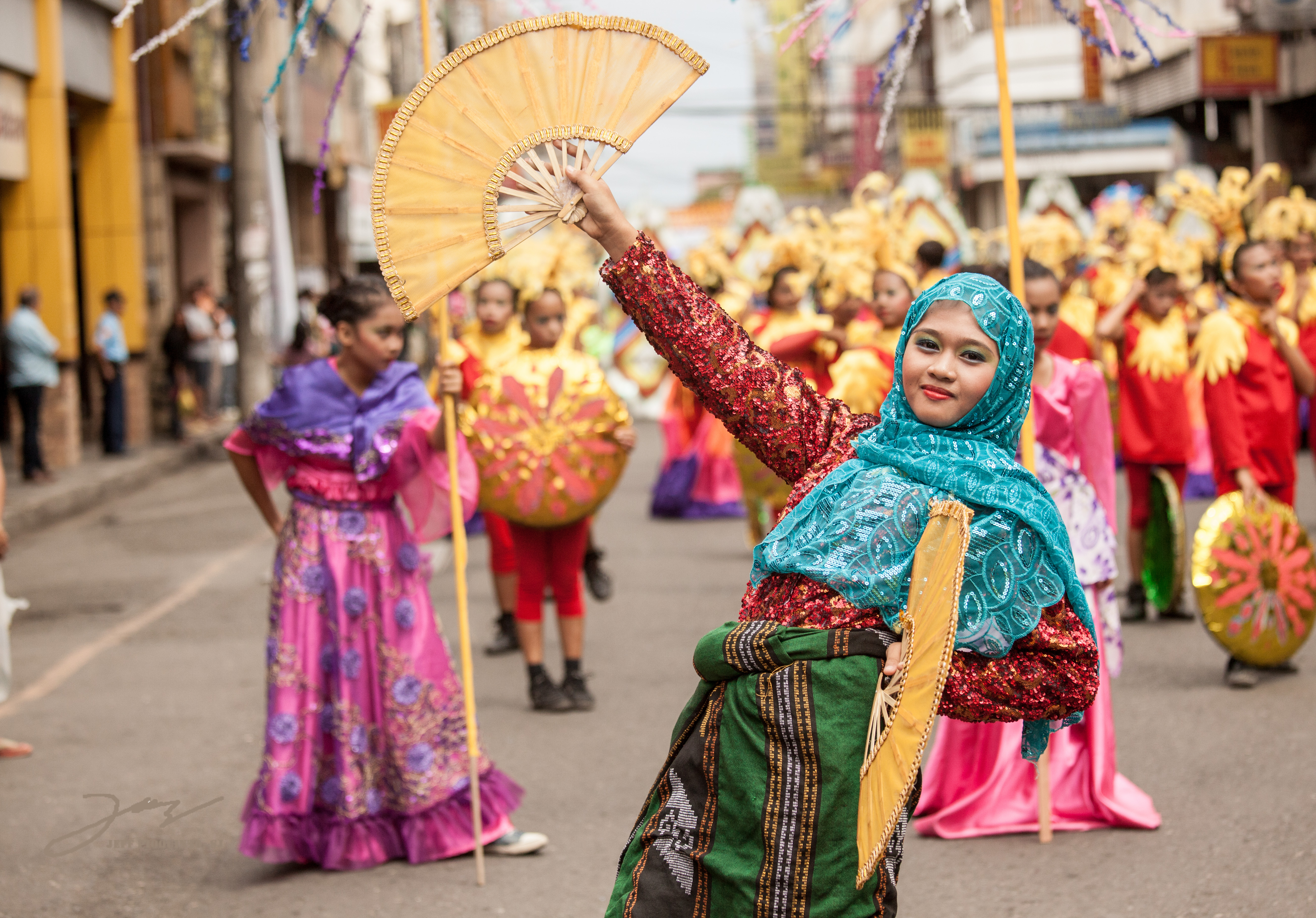
Muslim Dancer – Araw ng Dabaw in 2014

Islam reached the Philippines in the 14th century through trade networks linking the archipelago with Muslim merchants and missionaries from Persian Gulf, South India, and various Malay Muslim polities in Maritime Southeast Asia. By the 15th century, Islamic sultanates had been established in parts of Mindanao and the Sulu Archipelago, including the Sultanate of Sulu and the Maguindanao Sultanate. Muslim influence also extended into the area around Manila Bay through the Muslim-ruled polities of Maynila and Tondo before Spanish colonization.

Several early Muslim rulers governed parts of the Manila region before Spanish conquest, including Rajah Sulayman, Rajah Matanda, and Lakandula. Rajah Sulayman notably resisted Spanish occupation of Maynila during the late 16th century.

Following the arrival of the Spanish under Miguel López de Legazpi in 1565, Spanish colonial authorities and Catholic missionaries gradually displaced Islamic political influence in Luzon and the Visayas through military conquest, missionary activity, and colonial restructuring. Spanish colonial authorities frequently portrayed Muslim communities as political and religious adversaries of the Christianized population. The Spanish adopted the term “Moro” — derived from the Moors of Iberia — for Muslim Filipinos, linking them to the historical Christian-Muslim conflicts of Spain. Colonial writings often depicted Muslim rulers and raiders as threats to Christian settlements, helping justify military campaigns in Mindanao and Sulu. Historians have argued that Spanish colonial policies contributed to long-term social and political divisions between Christianized Filipinos in Luzon and the Visayas and Muslim populations in Mindanao and the Sulu Archipelago.

Spanish campaigns against Muslim polities, collectively known as the Moro Wars, continued for several centuries. These conflicts contributed to the decline of Islam in northern parts of the archipelago, although Muslim communities in Mindanao and Sulu retained considerable autonomy until the late 19th century. Historians generally describe Spanish policy toward Muslim Filipinos as a combination of military suppression, missionary conversion campaigns, and political marginalization, rather than direct rule through the Spanish Inquisition itself, whose institutional presence in the Philippines was limited.

The southern Filipino tribes were among the few indigenous Filipino communities that resisted Spanish rule and conversions to Christianity. The vast majority of Muslims in Philippines follow Sunni Islam of Shafi and Ash'ari school of jurisprudence and Theology, with small Shia and Ahmadiyya minorities. Islam is the oldest recorded monotheistic religion in the Philippines.

According to the Philippine Statistics Authority, the Muslim population of the Philippines in 2020 was 6.98 million (6.4%). Another 2012 study by the National Commission on Muslim Filipinos (NCMF) estimated that there were 10.7 million Muslims, or approximately 11 percent of the total population. Some Muslim scholars have observed that difficulties in getting accurate numbers have been compounded in some Muslim areas by the hostility of the inhabitants to government personnel, leading to difficulty in getting accurate data for the Muslim population in the country. The majority of Muslims live in Mindanao and nearby islands.

=== Baháʼí Faith ===
The Baháʼí Faith in the Philippines started in 1921 with the first Baháʼí first visiting the Philippines that year, and by 1944 a Baháʼí Local Spiritual Assembly was established. In the early 1960s, during a period of accelerated growth, the community grew from 200 in 1960 to 1000 by 1962 and 2000 by 1963. In 1964 the National Spiritual Assembly of the Baháʼís of the Philippines was elected and by 1980 there were 64,000 Baháʼís and 45 local assemblies. The Baháʼís have been active in multi/inter-faith developments. The 2010 World Christian Encyclopedia estimates the Philippines has the world's sixth largest population of Baháʼís, at just over 275,000.

=== Judaism ===
In the 1590s some Jews fleeing from the Inquisition were recorded to have come to the Philippines. In 2006, Metro Manila had the largest Jewish community in the Philippines, which consisted of roughly 100 families. As of 2018, the Jewish population comprised between 100 and 300 individuals, depending on one's definition of "Jew".

The country's only synagogue, Beth Yaacov, is located in Makati. There are other Jews elsewhere in the country, but these are much fewer and almost all transients, either diplomats or business envoys, and their existence is almost totally unknown in mainstream society. There are a few Israelis in Manila recruiting caregivers for Israel, some work in call centers, entrepreneurs, and a few other executives.

== Dharmic religions ==
=== Buddhism ===
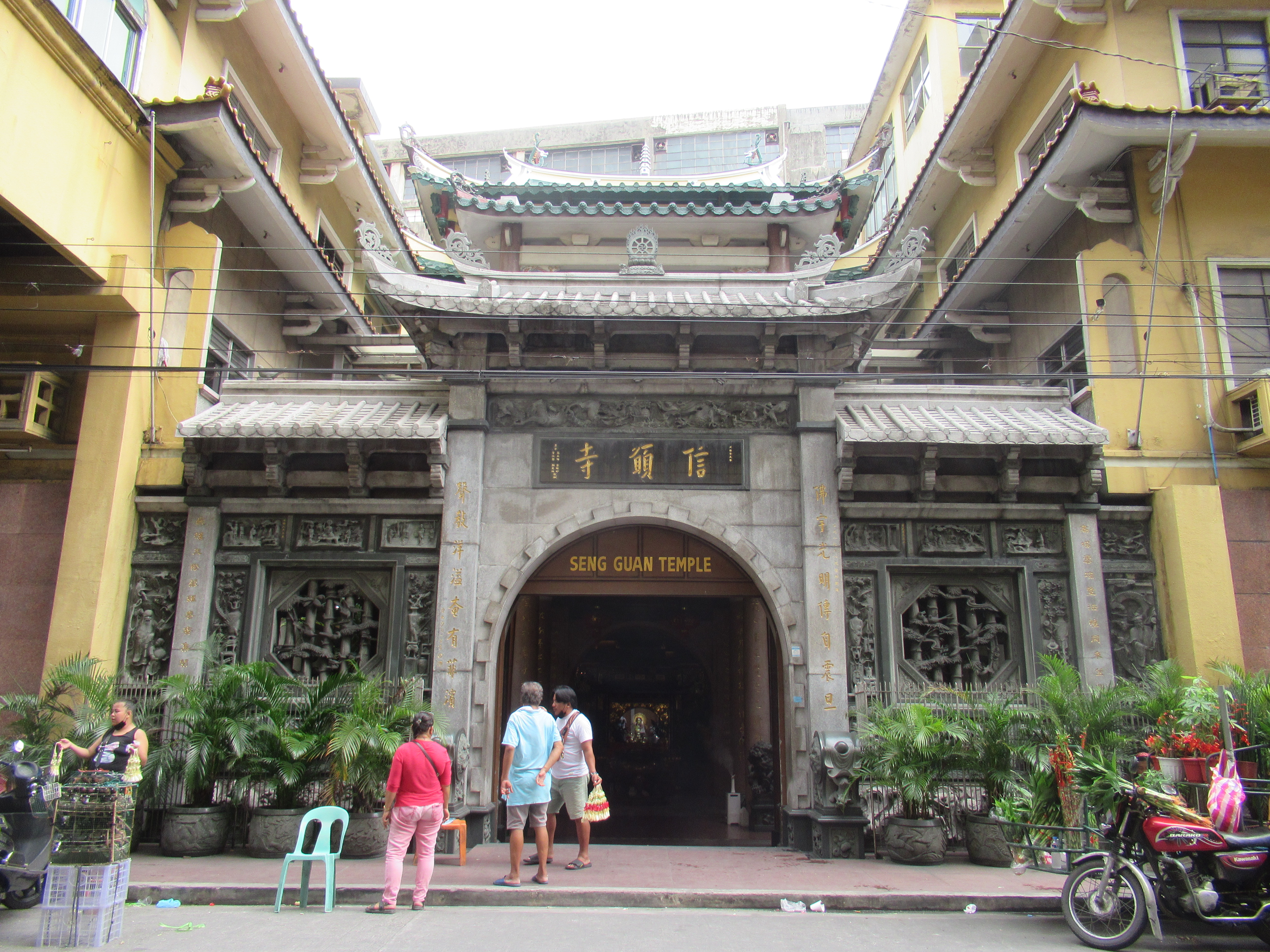
Seng Guan Temple in Manila

No written records exist about the early Buddhism in the Philippines. However, archaeological discoveries and the few scant references in the other nations' historical records can tell about the existence of Buddhism from the 9th century onward in the islands. These records mention the independent states that comprise the Philippines and which show that they were not united as one country in the early days. Archaeological finds include Buddhist artifacts characterized by Vajrayana influence.

Loanwords with Buddhist context appear in languages of the Philippines. Archaeological finds include Buddhist artifacts. The style are of Vajrayana influence. The Philippines's early states must have become the tributary states of the powerful Buddhist Srivijaya empire that controlled the trade and its sea routes from the 6th century to the 13th century in Southeast Asia. The states's trade contacts with the empire long before or in the 9th century must have served as the conduit for introducing Vajrayana Buddhism to the islands.

Both Srivijaya empire in Sumatra and Majapahit empire in Java were unknown in history until 1918 when the Ecole Francaise d'Extreme Orient's George Coedes postulated their existence because they had been mentioned in the records of the Chinese Tang and Sung imperial dynasties. Ji Ying, a Chinese monk and scholar, stayed in Sumatra from 687 to 689 on his way to India. He wrote on the Srivijaya's splendour, "Buddhism was flourishing throughout the islands of Southeast Asia. Many of the kings and the chieftains in the islands in the southern seas admire and believe in Buddhism, and their hearts are set on accumulating good action."

Both empires replaced their early Theravada Buddhist religion with Vajrayana Buddhism in the 7th century.

According to the 2020 Census, there were 39,158 adherents of Buddhism in the Philippines. Alternatively, a presenter at the Permanent Mission of the Republic of the Philippines to the United Nations claimed in her speech that 2% of the Philippine population practiced Buddhism. Buddhism practice is concentrated among Filipinos of both Chinese and Japanese descents. There are several prominent Buddhist temples in the country like Seng Guan Temple in Manila and Lon Wa Buddhist Temple in Mindanao.

=== Hinduism ===
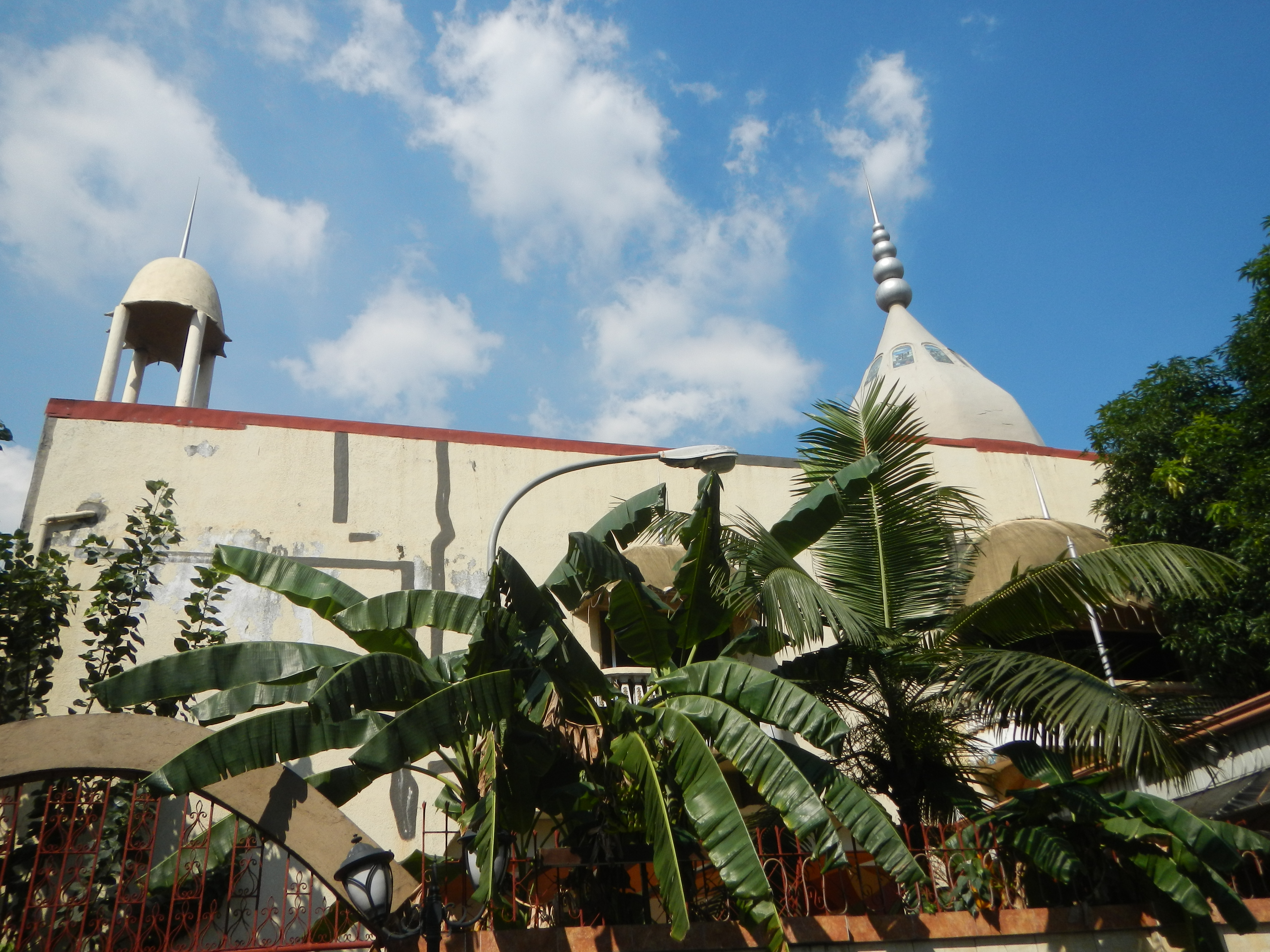
Hindu temple in Manila

The Srivijaya Empire and Majapahit Empire on what is now Malaysia and Indonesia, introduced Hinduism and Buddhism to the islands. Ancient statues of Hindu-Buddhist gods have been found in the Philippines dating as far back as 600 to 1600 years from present.

The archipelagos of Southeast Asia were under the influence of Hindu Tamil people, Gujarati people and Indonesian traders through the ports of Malay-Indonesian islands. Indian religions, possibly an amalgamated version of Hindu-Buddhist arrived in Philippines archipelago in the 1st millennium, through the Indonesian kingdom of Srivijaya followed by Majapahit. Archeological evidence suggesting exchange of ancient spiritual ideas from India to the Philippines includes the 1.79 kilogram, 21 carat gold Hindu goddess Agusan (sometimes referred to as Golden Tara), found in Mindanao in 1917 after a storm and flood exposed its location.

Another gold artifact, from the Tabon caves in the island of Palawan, is an image of Garuda, the bird who is the mount of Vishnu. The discovery of sophisticated Hindu imagery and gold artifacts in Tabon caves has been linked to those found from Oc Eo, in the Mekong Delta in Southern Vietnam. These archaeological evidence suggests an active trade of many specialized goods and gold between India and Philippines and coastal regions of Vietnam and China. Golden jewelry found so far include rings, some surmounted by images of Nandi – the sacred bull, linked chains, inscribed gold sheets, gold plaques decorated with repoussé images of Hindu deities.

Today Hinduism is largely confined to the Indian Filipinos and the expatriate Indian community. There are temples also for Sikhism, also located in the provinces and in the cities, sometimes located near Hindu temples. The two Paco temples are well known, comprising a Hindu temple and a Sikh temple.

There are two Hindu temples in Manila city: Hari Ram Temple (Paco) and Saya Aur Devi Mandir Temple (Paco). There is a Hindu temple called "Indian Hindu Temple" in Cebu City, Philippines. There is a Hindu Temple in Baguio, Philippines called "Baguio Hindu Temple". The "Davao Indian Temple", located in Davao City, is a single building that consists of worship halls of Indian religions including Hinduism.

== Indigenous religions ==
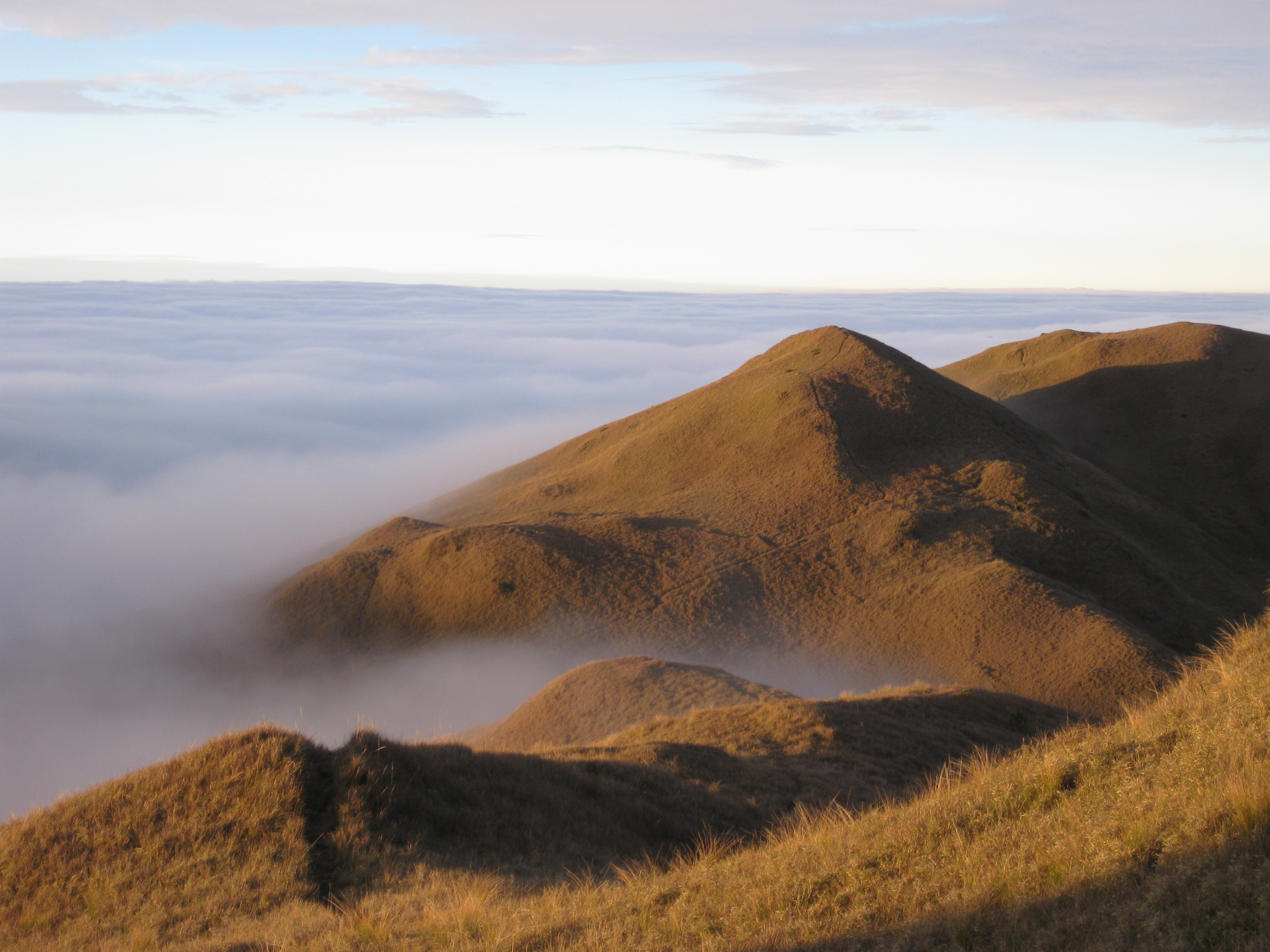
Mount Pulag is one of the many sacred grounds of adherents of the Indigenous Philippine folk religions.

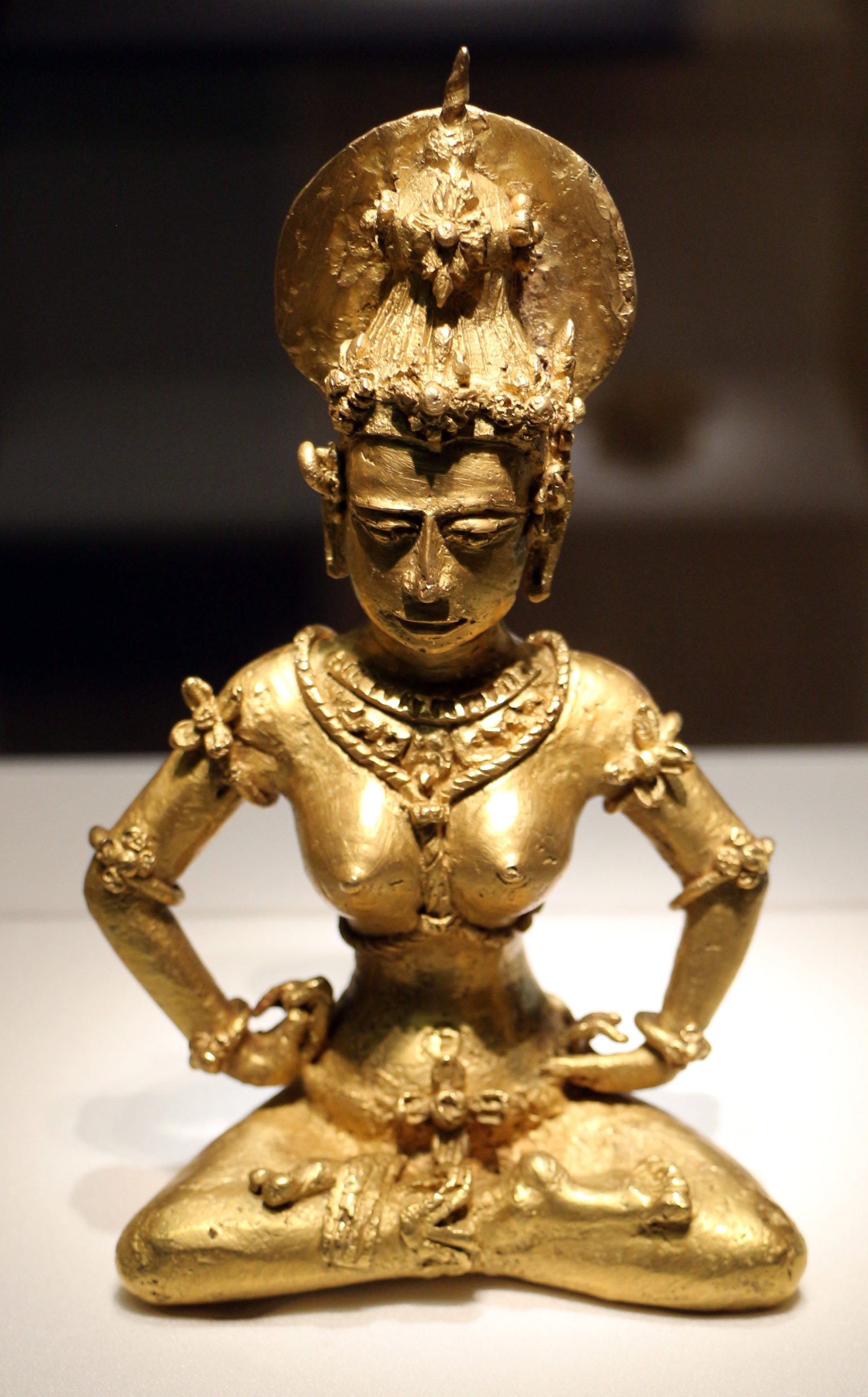
The Agusan image statue discovered in Mindanao, Philippines and dated circa 900–950 CE.

Indigenous Philippine folk religions, are a diverse group of native religions that have existed in the islands as the people's original faiths. Each possess their own set of belief systems and religious stories and narratives, mostly originating from beliefs held during the pre-Hispanic era, although many are also modern. Some of these beliefs have been influenced by Hinduism and Buddhism and were falsely regarded by the Spanish and American colonizers as "myths" and "superstitions" in an effort to de-legitimize the precolonial beliefs of Filipinos against Filipinos. Today, some of these native beliefs are still held by many Filipinos, both in urban and rural areas.

These religions tell the story of various narratives originating from various sources, having similarities with Indonesian and Malay religious narratives, as well as Hindu, Muslim, Buddhist, and Christian traditions. Beliefs include the notions of heaven (kaluwalhatian, kalangitan, kamurawayan, etc.), hell (kasamaan, sulad, etc.), and the human soul (kaluluwa, kaulolan, etc.). They explain the nature of the world through the lives and actions of deities (gods, goddesses), heroes, and other beings. The majority of these religious narratives are passed on through oral tradition, and preserved through the aid of community spiritual leaders or shamans (babaylan, katalonan, mumbaki, baglan, machanitu, walian, mangubat, bahasa, etc.) and community elders.

Today, many ethnic peoples continue to practice and conserve their unique indigenous religions, notably in ancestral domains, although foreign and foreign-inspired Hispanic and Arabic religions continue to interfere with their life-ways through conversions, land-grabbing, inter-marriage, and/or land-buying. Various scholarly works have been made regarding Anitism and its many religious aspects, although much of its stories and traditions are still undocumented by the international community.

The 2020 census recorded 0.23% of the population adhering to the Indigenous Philippine folk religions, an increase from the previous 2010 census which notes a 0.19% adherence.

=== Revitalization attempts ===
In search of a national culture and identity, away from those imposed by Spain during the colonial age, Filipino revolutionaries during the Philippine revolution proposed to revive the indigenous Philippine folk religions and make them the national religion of the entire country. The Katipunan opposed the religious teachings of the Spanish friars, saying that they "obscured rather than explained religious truths." After the revival of the Katipunan during the Spanish–American War, an idealized form of the folk religions was proposed by some, with the worship of God under the ancient name of Bathala, which applies to all supreme deities under the many ethnic pantheons in the Philippines.

== Irreligion ==
Based on the 2020 Census, the Philippine Statistics Authority reported the number of irreligious at less than 0.1% of the Philippine population.

The Philippine Atheists and Agnostics Society (PATAS) is a nonprofit organization for the public understanding of atheism and agnosticism in the Philippines which educates society, and eliminates myths and misconceptions about atheism and agnosticism. In February 2009, Filipino Freethinkers was formed. Since 2011, the Philippine Atheists and Agnostics Society has held its OUT Campaigns in Rizal Park and Quezon Memorial Circle. Also it held two feeding programs "Good without Religion" in Bacoor, Cavite. The society also is a member affiliate and associate of various international atheist organizations such as the Atheist Alliance International, Institute for Science and Human Values, and the International Humanist and Ethical Union, as one among secular organizations that promotes free thought and scientific development in the Philippines. The 2015 Philippine Census reported the religion of about 0.02% of the population as "none".

As of 2021, the Philippine Atheists and Agnostics Society is dormant and non-active, following a major internal scandal on finance matters.

== Perception of religion during the COVID-19 pandemic ==
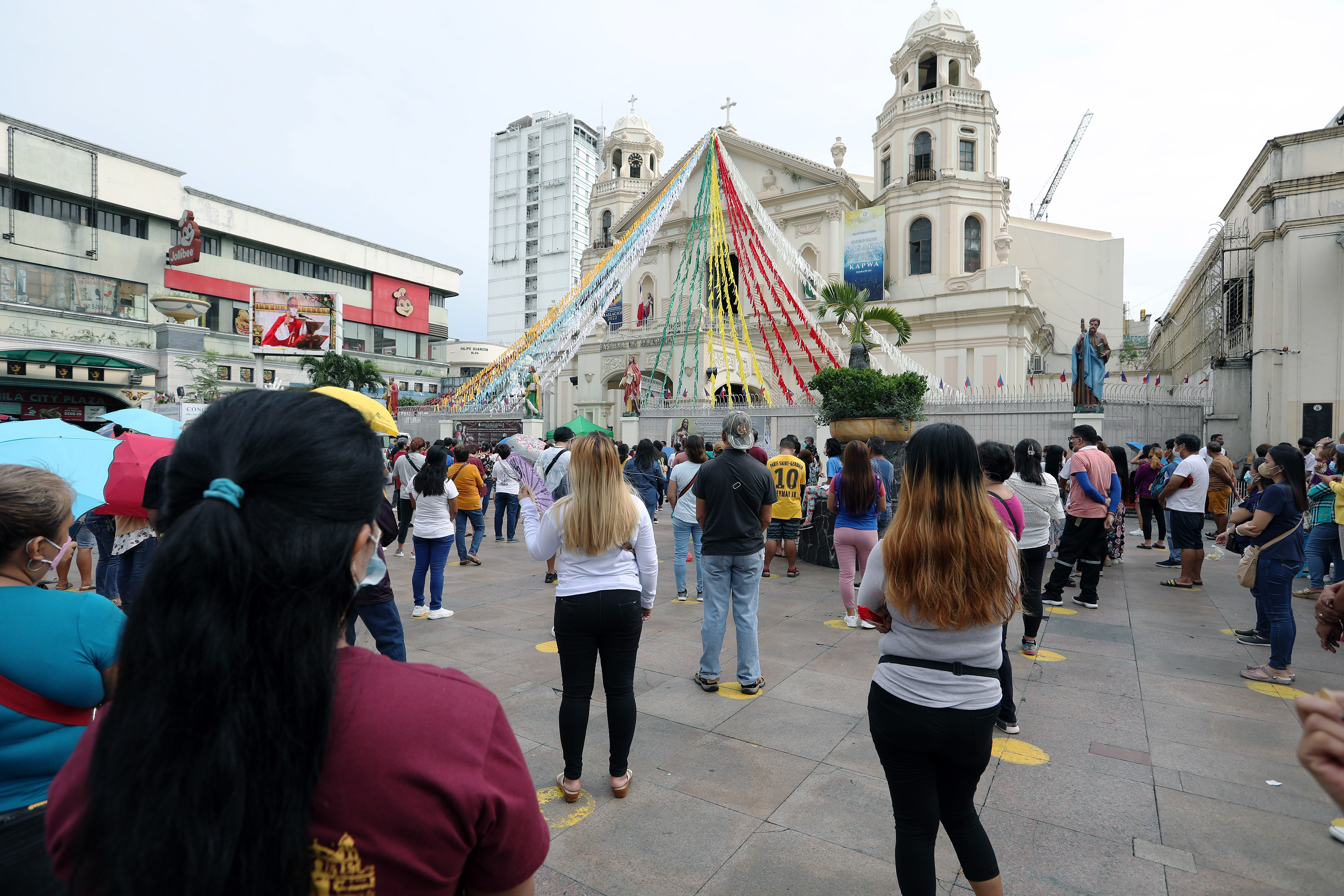
Catholic devotees observe social distancing as they attend Mass in front of Quiapo Church in Manila on July 1, 2022.

According to a 2020 survey by the Social Weather Stations (SWS), there had been a decline in the perception of importance in religion amidst the COVID-19 pandemic. According to the survey, 73 percent of Filipino adults deemed religion as important, which fell by 10 points compared to the pre-pandemic December 2019 survey which stated 83 percent believed religion is important in their lives.

Christianity, especially Catholicism, received a significant decline from 84 percent to 71 percent; other Christian denominations, except the Iglesia ni Cristo, fell from 78 percent to 71 percent. Iglesia ni Cristo, meanwhile, increased from 69 percent to 88 percent. In terms of Islam, it fell from 94 percent to 93 percent as "very important", almost receiving no change.

The 2020 SWS survey stated that Mindanao had a huge number of respondents who viewed religion as important (88 percent), followed by Luzon and Metro Manila (70 percent each), with Visayas being the lowest (64 percent).

== Religion and politics ==
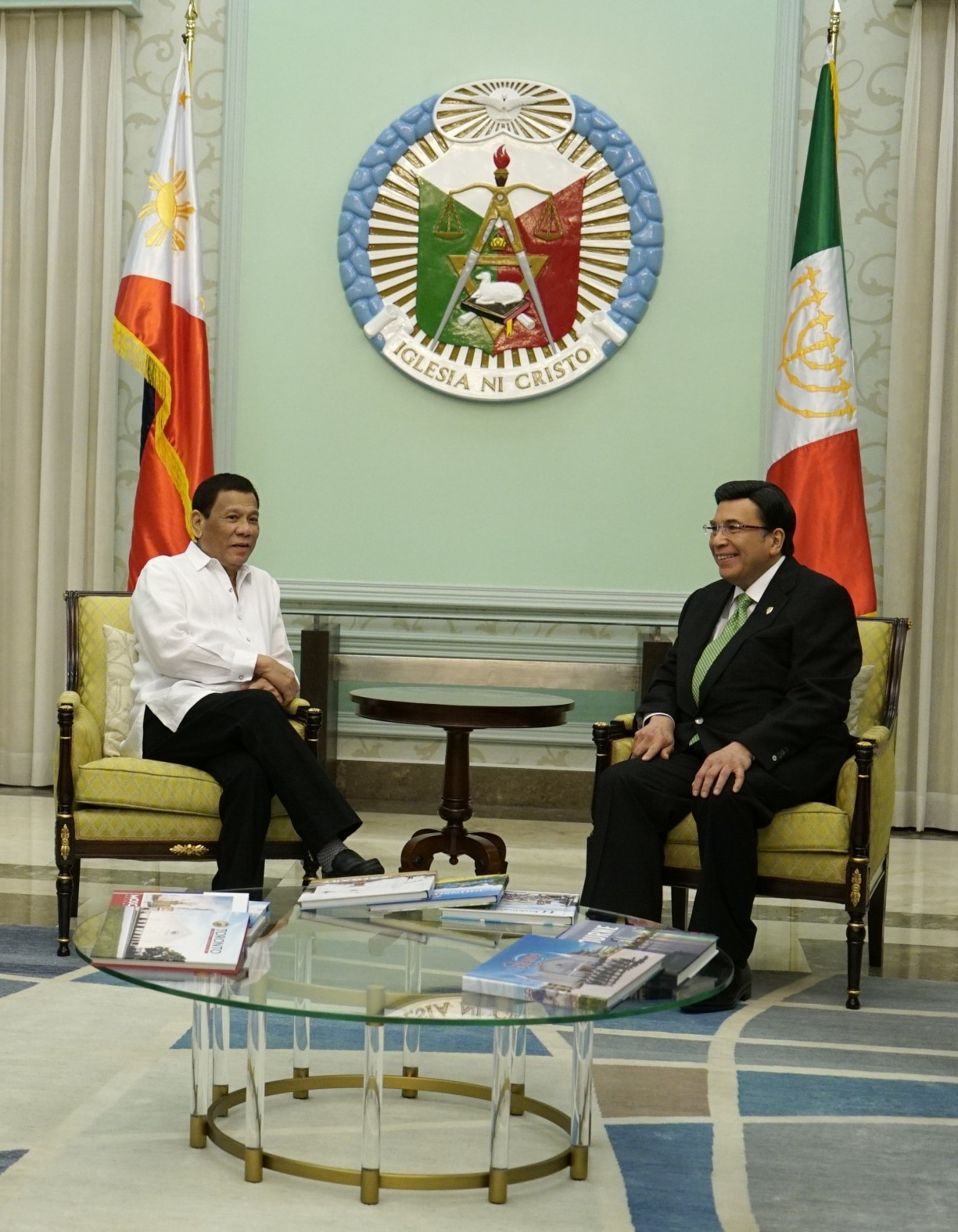
President Rodrigo Duterte (left) visits Iglesia ni Cristo leader Eduardo Manalo at the INC Central Temple in Quezon City in December 2018.

The 1987 Constitution of the Philippines declares "[t]he separation of Church and State shall be inviolable" (Article II, Section 6), and "[n]o law shall be made respecting an establishment of religion, or prohibiting the free exercise thereof. The free exercise and enjoyment of religious profession and worship, without discrimination or preference, shall forever be allowed. No religious test shall be required for the exercise of civil or political rights." (Article III, Section 5). Joaquin Bernas, a Filipino Jesuit specializing in constitutional law, acknowledges that there were complex issues that were brought to court and numerous attempts to use the separation of Church and State against the Catholic Church, but he defends the statement, saying that "the fact that he [Marcos] tried to do it does not deny the validity of the separation of church and state".

On April 28, 2004, the Philippines Supreme Court reversed the ruling of a lower court ordering five religious leaders to refrain from endorsing a candidate for elective office. Manila Judge Conception Alarcon-Vergara had ruled that the "head of a religious organization who influences or threatens to punish members could be held liable for coercion and violation of citizen's right to vote freely". The lawsuit filed that "the Church's active participation in partisan politics, using the awesome voting strength of its faithful flock, will enable it to elect men to public office who will in turn be forever beholden to its leaders, enabling them to control the government".

They claimed that this violates the Philippine constitution's separation of Church and State clause. The named respondents were the Luis Antonio Tagle, a cardinal and the Archbishop of Manila, El Shaddai Movement Leader Mike Velarde, Iglesia ni Cristo Executive Minister Eduardo V. Manalo and Jesus Is Lord Church Worldwide leader Eddie Villanueva. Manalo's Iglesia ni Cristo practices bloc voting. Former Catholic Archbishop Cardinal Jaime Sin had been instrumental in rallying support for the assumption to power of Corazon Aquino and Gloria Arroyo. Velarde supported Fidel V. Ramos, Joseph Estrada, Gloria Macapagal Arroyo and Benigno Aquino III while Villanueva endorsed Fidel Ramos and Jose De Venecia. The papal nuncio agreed with the decision of the lower court while the other respondents challenged the decision.

In January 2026, the annual Black Nazarene procession in Manila drew national attention when participants also staged anti-corruption protests. Demonstrators chanted slogans and displayed banners criticizing infrastructure-related corruption allegations against government officials. Observers noted that the event highlighted the growing link between religious gatherings and civic expression in the Philippines.

== See also ==
- Funeral practices and burial customs in the Philippines
- Religion in pre-colonial Philippines
