= Philippine Atheism, Agnosticism, and Secularism =

Filipino non-profit atheist organization

Philippine Atheism, Agnosticism, and Secularism Inc.
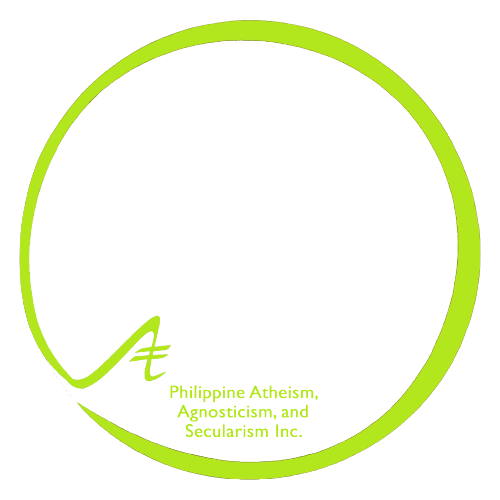
- PATAS logo
- Predecessor: Philippine Atheist and Agnostics Society
- Founded: 2011; 2017 (refounded)
- Founder: Jose Juan Paraiso
- Purpose: To promote public understanding of atheism and agnosticism; To eliminate myths and misconceptions about atheism and agnosticism; To promote social responsibility by replacing superstitious imperatives with rational secular solutions, grounded in lack of supernatural beliefs.
- Location: Mandaluyong City, Philippines
- Method: Education, outreach, advocacy
- Website: https://patasinc.org/
- Formerly called: Philippine Atheist and Agnostics Society (2011–2017)

The Philippine Atheism, Agnosticism, and Secularism Inc. (PATAS), formerly known as the Philippine Atheist and Agnostics Society, is a nonprofit organization for the public understanding of atheism and agnosticism in the Philippines. It serves to educate society, and eliminate myths and misconceptions about atheism and agnosticism. It speaks against discrimination of the non-religious, and for equal opportunities as Filipino citizens. PATAS encourages harmonious information exchange among its atheist and agnostic members, and encourages its members to come out and speak for their lack of religious beliefs. The society was founded in February 2011 by Jose Juan Paraiso, who served as the first chairperson and president before closing. In 2017, after permission from the old PATAS board, it was refounded again.

== History ==
=== First Atheist and Agnostics Convention ===
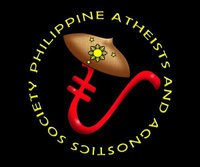
The old logo of PATAS.

On April 21, 2012, PATAS organized the First Atheists and Agnostics Convention in the Philippines. It was a one-day learning event and social gathering of Filipino nonbelievers.

The convention, with its theme: "Filipino non-belief—are you ready for this?", also served as a venue for the public exposure for socially-involved and organized community of Filipino nonbelievers.

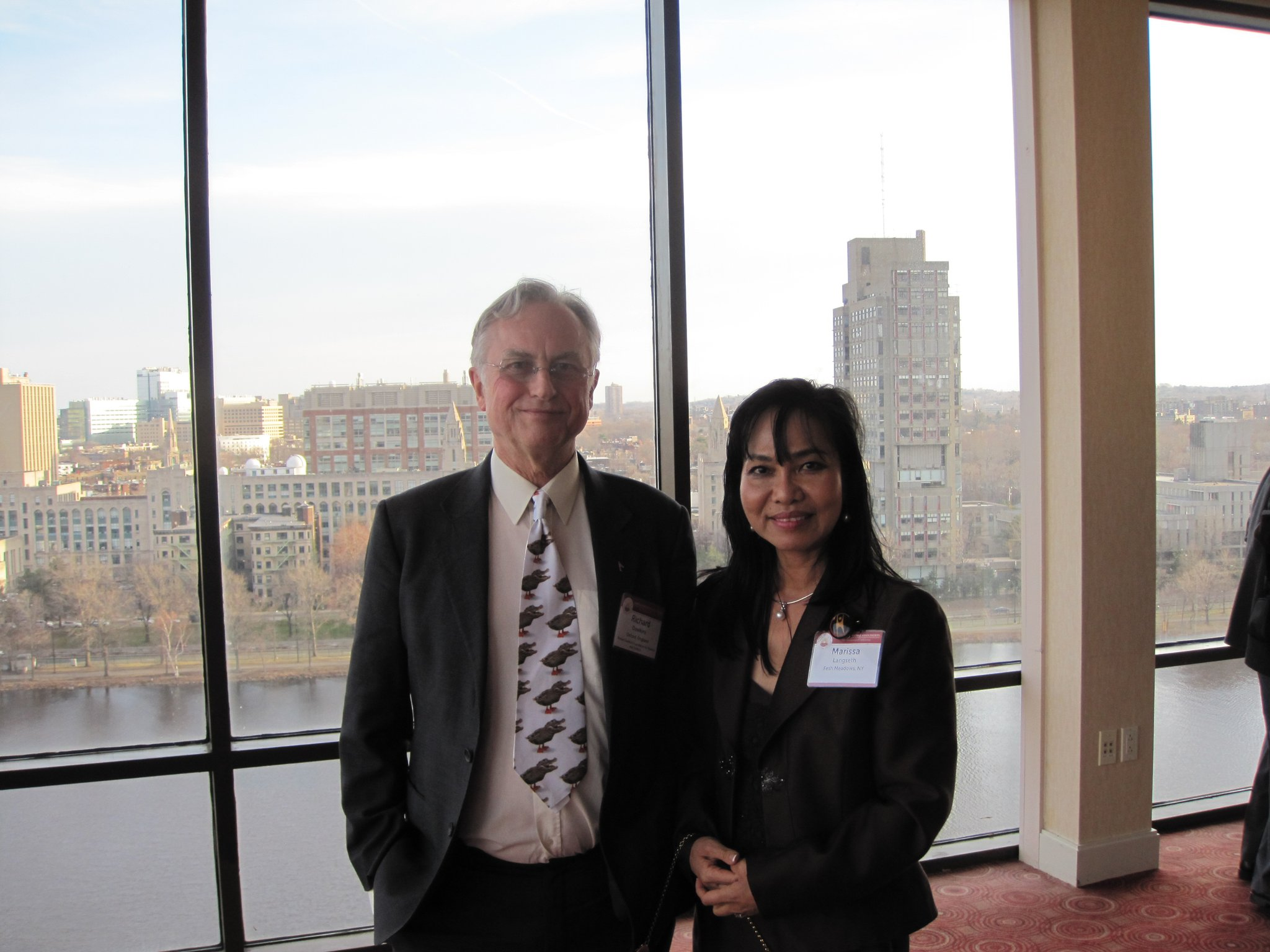
Marissa Torres-Langseth, PATAS chairwoman and Richard Dawkins at the American Humanist Association conference in April 2011.

=== PATAS Weekly ===
PATAS Weekly is a live show on Discord that takes place every Saturday on 6:00-8:00 P.M. PST. In the show, people talk about their current beliefs in atheism and why they believe so.

== See also ==
- Irreligion in the Philippines
- Religion in the Philippines
