= Irreligion in the Philippines =

In the Philippines, atheists and agnostics are not officially counted in the census of the country, although the Philippine Statistics Authority in 2020 reported that 43,931 Filipinos (or 0.04043% of the total Philippine population) have no religious affiliation or have answered "none". Additionally, an undated study by the Dentsu Communication Institute in Japan claimed that around 11 million or 11% of Filipinos are irreligious. Since 2011, the non-religious increasingly organized themselves, especially among the youth in the country. There is a stigma attached to being an atheist in the Philippines, and this necessitates many Filipino atheists to communicate with each other via the Internet, for example via the Philippine Atheism, Agnosticism, and Secularism Inc. formerly known as Philippine Atheists and Agnostics Society.

== Growth ==
The number of atheists has risen consistently since the 1990s, as has the number of people considering it, church attendance, and overall religiously. One in eleven Filipino Catholics consider leaving the Church, only 37% attend church every week, and only 29% consider themselves strongly religious. Overall, anti-Catholic sentiment is a growing trend in the Philippines, with former president Rodrigo Duterte being an outspoken critic of the church for its sex scandals and allegations of corruption.

According to both Catholics and Atheists, belief in the Catholic Church is linked to poverty more than it is religious conviction, many go to Church out of desperation and need for hope, and some atheists, such as Miss. M, founder of HAPI, believe that starting secular outreach institutions will help Filipinos shed reliance on the Church and put their future in their own hands.

When I asked some of the worshippers there why religion is so important to them, poverty was a common answer

— Michael French

Its very important because we are very poor, so that's the only thing we cling on to, the hope, every time we suffer, we all say, 'That's okay because it's the will of God.'

— Antonia Deligero

My mother would go to church to ask for food and clothing and money, most Filipinos think that God provides. It will give a lot of people common sense when we let them know that there really is no God.

— Marissa Torres Langseth (Miss. M)

== Persecution and discrimination ==
Filipino atheists are often harassed for their disbelief, and according to one atheist it's "how Filipinos think. They view atheists as Satanists".

== Organizations ==
- Philippine Atheism, Agnosticism, and Secularism Inc.
- Filipino Freethinkers
- Humanist PH

== Programs ==
- godless Longganisa
- The Roundtable

== Prominent figures ==
- Red Tani
- Marissa Torres Langseth
- Mac Adornado

== Philippine religious distribution ==
According to the 2020 census, the religious distribution of the country's population was as follows:

Population by religious affiliation (2020)
Affiliation	Number	Percentage
Roman Catholic (Note: excluding Catholic Charismatic numbering 74,096 persons (0.07%))	85,645,362	78.8
Islam	6,981,710	6.4
Iglesia ni Cristo	2,806,524	2.6
Philippine Independent Church	1,458,992	1.4
Seventh-day Adventist	862,725	0.8
Bible Baptist Church	540,364	0.5
United Church of Christ in the Philippines	470,792	0.4
Jehovah's Witnesses	457,245	0.4
Church of Christ	429,921	0.4
Other religious affiliations	8,954,291	8.2
None	43,931	0
Not reported	15,186	0
Total	108,667,043	100%
Source: Philippine Statistics Authority

== See also ==
- Hinduism in the Philippines
- Buddhism in the Philippines
