= Rafael Guarga =

Uruguayan industrial engineer and inventor

Rafael Andrés Guarga Ferro (born 23 August 1940 in Montevideo) is a Uruguayan industrial engineer and inventor.

== Career ==
After graduating from the University of the Republic, Guarga had to leave his country due to the civic-military dictatorship. He pursued his career in Mexico, obtaining a doctorate at the National Autonomous University of Mexico. Back in Uruguay he devoted himself to lecturing; in 1992-1998 he served as Dean of the School of Engineering, and in 1998-2006 as Rector of the university.

In the late 1990s Guarga invented the selective inverted sink (acronym SIS), a device used by farmers to protect plants from frost.
