= Selective inverted sink =

The selective inverted sink or SIS is a device used by farmers to protect plants and crops from hoar frost, developed by Uruguayan mechanical engineer Rafael Guarga in the late 1990s.

The sink is formed by a large fan housed in a low chimney-like structure, and works by defeating surface temperature inversion. Cold air is denser than warm air, and will pool at ground level. During calm weather and clear nights the ground radiates its heat outwards cooling itself, and the lower layer of the atmosphere, below freezing and thus freezing and even killing crops. Vents near the base of the chimney allow cold surface air to be pulled up through the chimney, creating a suction effect that draws warmer air down to surface level.

The SIS is more efficient than typical ground-heaters, and is widely used to combat frost.
