= Frost =

Coating or deposit of ice

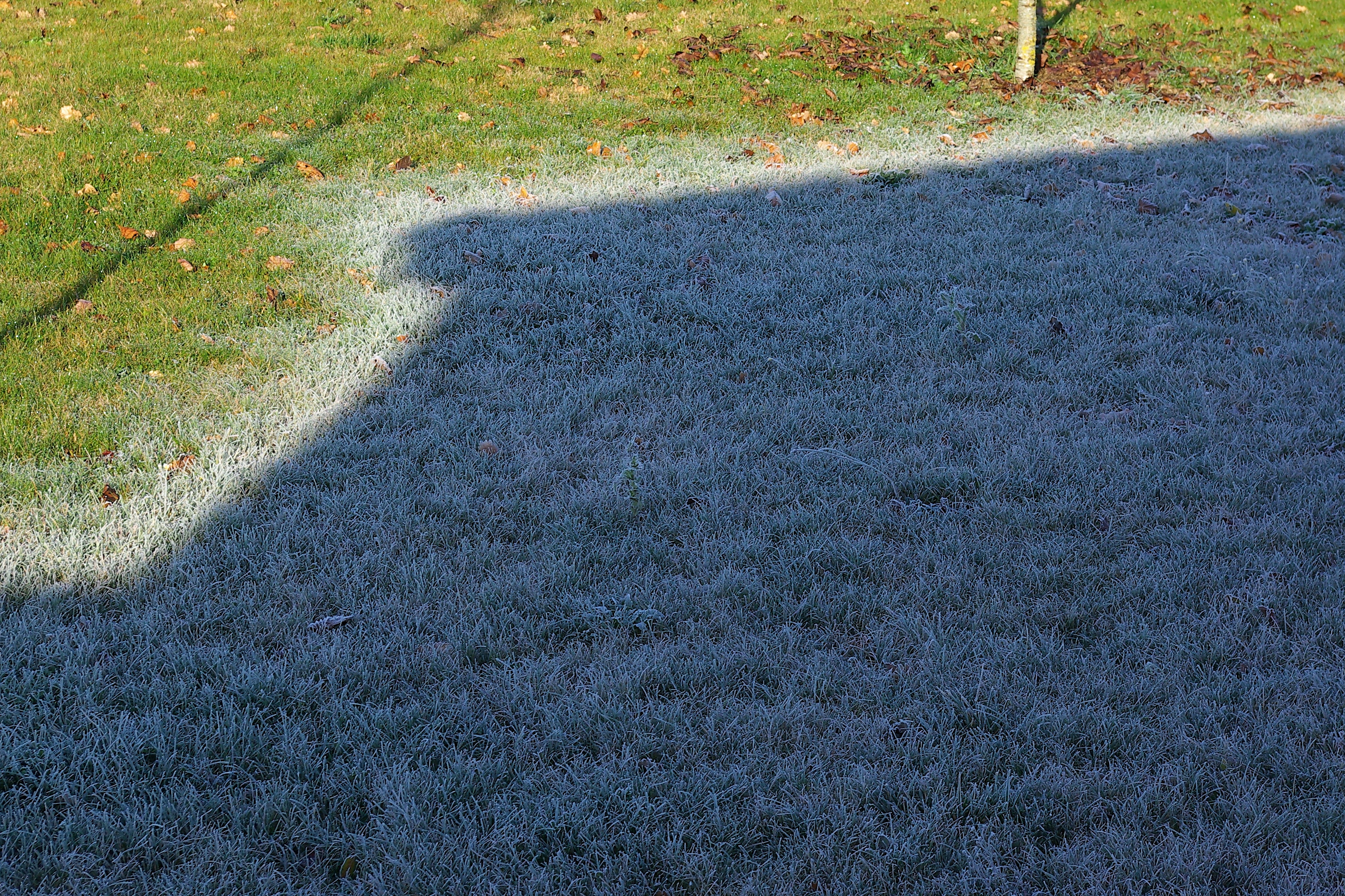
A patch of grass showing three zones.: 1. crystalline frost in the below-freezing shade (blue, lower right); 2. frost in the warming but still below freezing strip most recently exposed to sunlight (white, center); 3. frost-free region: here, the previous frost has melted from a more prolonged exposure to sunlight (green, upper left.)

Frost is a layer of ice on a solid surface, which forms from water vapor that deposits onto a freezing surface. Frost forms when the air contains more water vapor than it can normally hold at a specific temperature. The process is similar to the formation of dew, except it occurs below the freezing point of water typically without crossing through a liquid state.

Air always contains a certain amount of water vapor, depending on temperature. Warmer air can hold more than colder air. When the atmosphere contains more water than it can hold at a specific temperature, its relative humidity rises above 100% becoming supersaturated, and the excess water vapor is forced to deposit onto any nearby surface, forming seed crystals. The temperature at which it will form is called the dew point, and depends on the humidity of air. When the temperature of the air drops below its dew point, excess water vapor is forced out of solution, resulting in a phase change directly from water vapor (a gas) to ice (a solid). As more water molecules are added to the seeds, crystal growth occurs, forming ice crystals. Crystals may vary in size and shape, from an even layer of numerous microscopic-seeds to fewer but much larger crystals, ranging from long dendritic crystals (tree-like) growing across a surface, acicular crystals (needle-like) growing outward from the surface, snowflake-shaped crystals, or even large, knifelike blades of ice covering an object, which depends on many factors such as temperature, air pressure, air motion and turbulence, surface roughness and wettability, and the level of supersaturation. For example, water vapor adsorbs to glass very well, so automobile windows will often frost before the paint, and large hoar-frost crystals can grow very rapidly when the air is very cold, calm, and heavily saturated, such as during an ice fog.

Frost may occur when warm, moist air comes into contact with a cold surface, cooling it below its dew point, such as warm breath on a freezing window. In the atmosphere, it more often occurs when both the air and the surface are below freezing, when the air experiences a drop in temperature bringing it below its dew point, for example, when the temperature falls after the sun sets. In temperate climates, it most commonly appears on surfaces near the ground as fragile white crystals; in cold climates, it occurs in a greater variety of forms. The propagation of crystal formation occurs by the process of nucleation, in specific, water nucleation, which is the same phenomenon responsible for the formation of clouds, fog, snow, rain and other meteorological phenomena.

The ice crystals of frost form as the result of fractal process development. The depth of frost crystals varies depending on the amount of time they have been accumulating, and the concentration of the water vapor (humidity). Frost crystals may be invisible (black), clear (translucent), or, if a mass of frost crystals scatters light in all directions, the coating of frost appears white.

Types of frost include crystalline (hoar frost or radiation frost) from deposition of water vapor from air of low humidity, white frost in humid conditions, window frost on glass surfaces, advection frost from cold wind over cold surfaces, black frost without visible ice at low temperatures and very low humidity, and rime under supercooled wet conditions.

Plants that have evolved in warmer climates suffer damage when the temperature falls low enough to freeze the water in the cells that make up the plant tissue. The tissue damage resulting from this process is known as "frost damage". Farmers in those regions where frost damage has been known to affect their crops often invest in substantial means to protect their crops from such damage.

== Formation ==
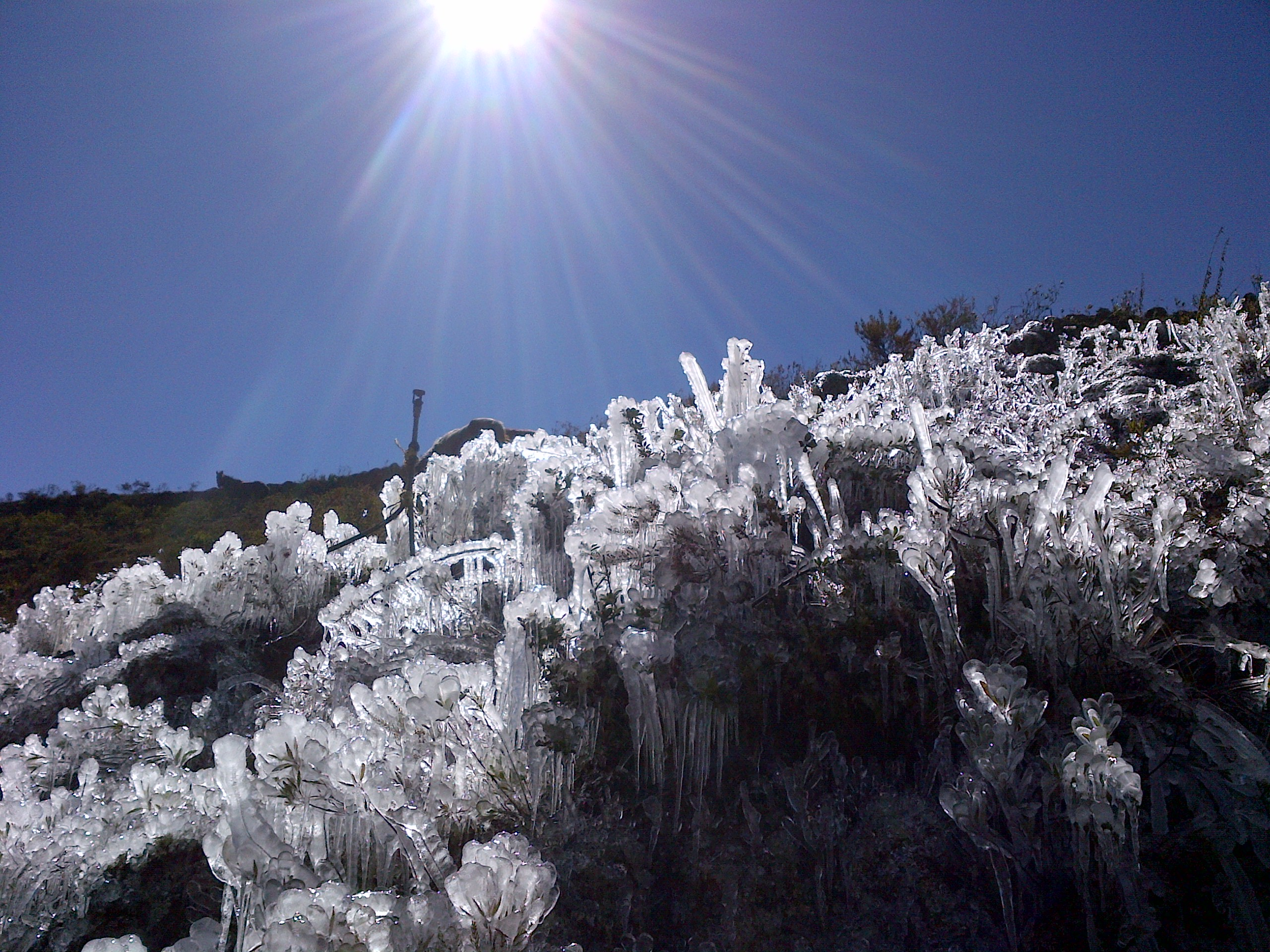
Frost in the highest town in Venezuela, Apartaderos: Because of its location in an alpine tundra ecosystem called páramo, a daily freeze-and-thaw cycle, sometimes described as "summer every day and winter every night", exists.

If a solid surface is chilled below the dew point of the surrounding humid air, and the surface itself is colder than freezing, ice will form on it. If the water deposits as a liquid that then freezes, it forms a coating that may look glassy, opaque, or crystalline, depending on its type. Depending on context, that process may also be called atmospheric icing. The ice it produces differs in some ways from crystalline frost, which consists of spicules of ice that typically project from the solid surface on which they grow.

The main difference between the ice coatings and frost spicules arises because the crystalline spicules grow directly from desublimation of water vapour from air, and desublimation is not a factor in icing of freezing surfaces. For desublimation to proceed, the surface must be below the frost point of the air, meaning that it is sufficiently cold for ice to form without passing through the liquid phase. The air must be humid, but not sufficiently humid to permit the condensation of liquid water, or icing will result instead of desublimation. The size of the crystals depends largely on the temperature, the amount of water vapor available, and how long they have been growing undisturbed.

As a rule, except in conditions where supercooled droplets are present in the air, frost will form only if the deposition surface is colder than the surrounding air. For instance, frost may be observed around cracks in cold wooden sidewalks when humid air escapes from the warmer ground beneath. Other objects on which frost commonly forms are those with low specific heat or high thermal emissivity, such as blackened metals, hence the accumulation of frost on the heads of rusty nails.

The apparently erratic occurrence of frost in adjacent localities is due partly to differences of elevation, the lower areas becoming colder on calm nights. Where static air settles above an area of ground in the absence of wind, the absorptivity and specific heat of the ground strongly influence the temperature that the trapped air attains.

== Types ==
=== Hoar frost ===
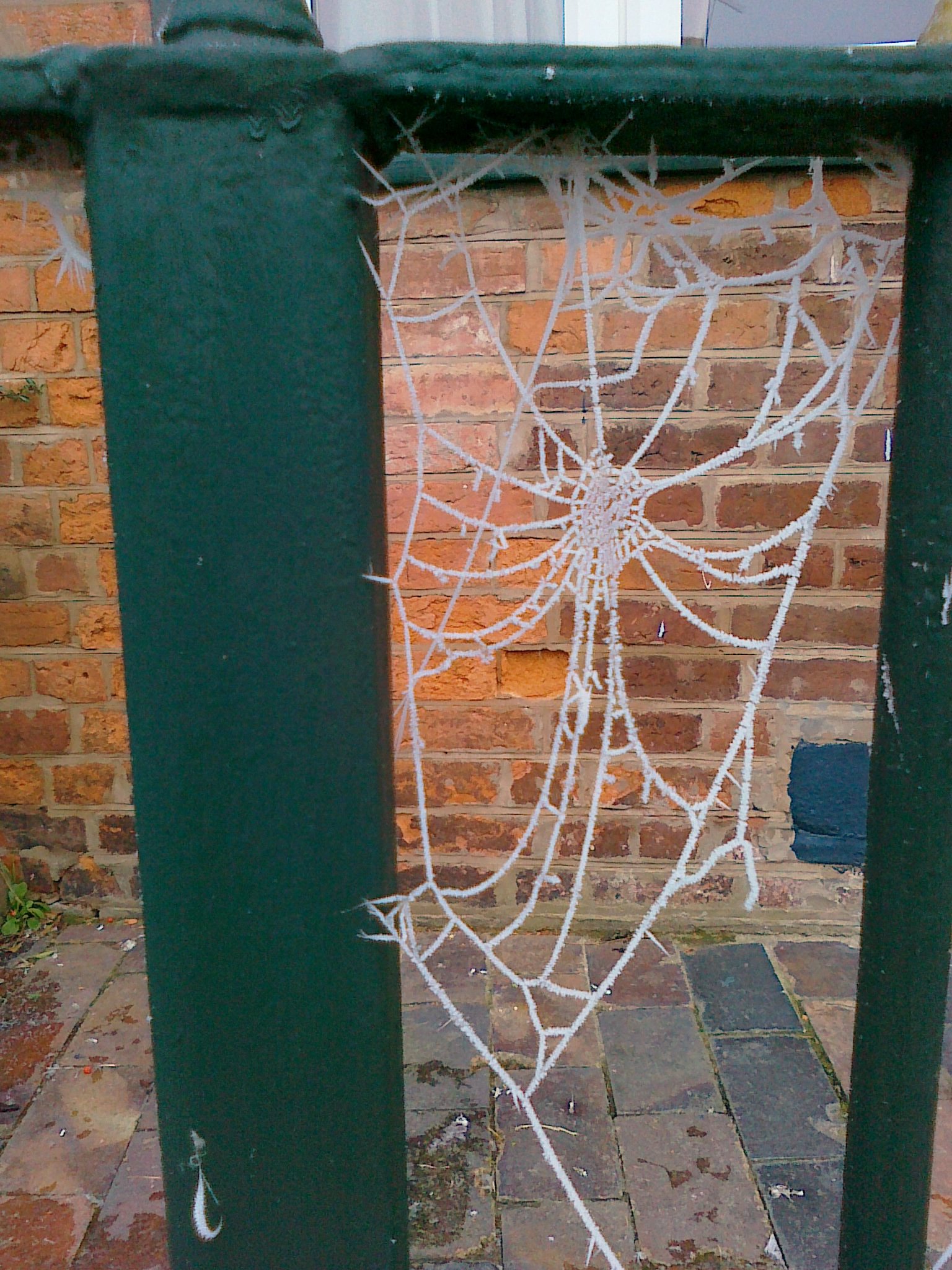
A spider web covered in air hoar frost

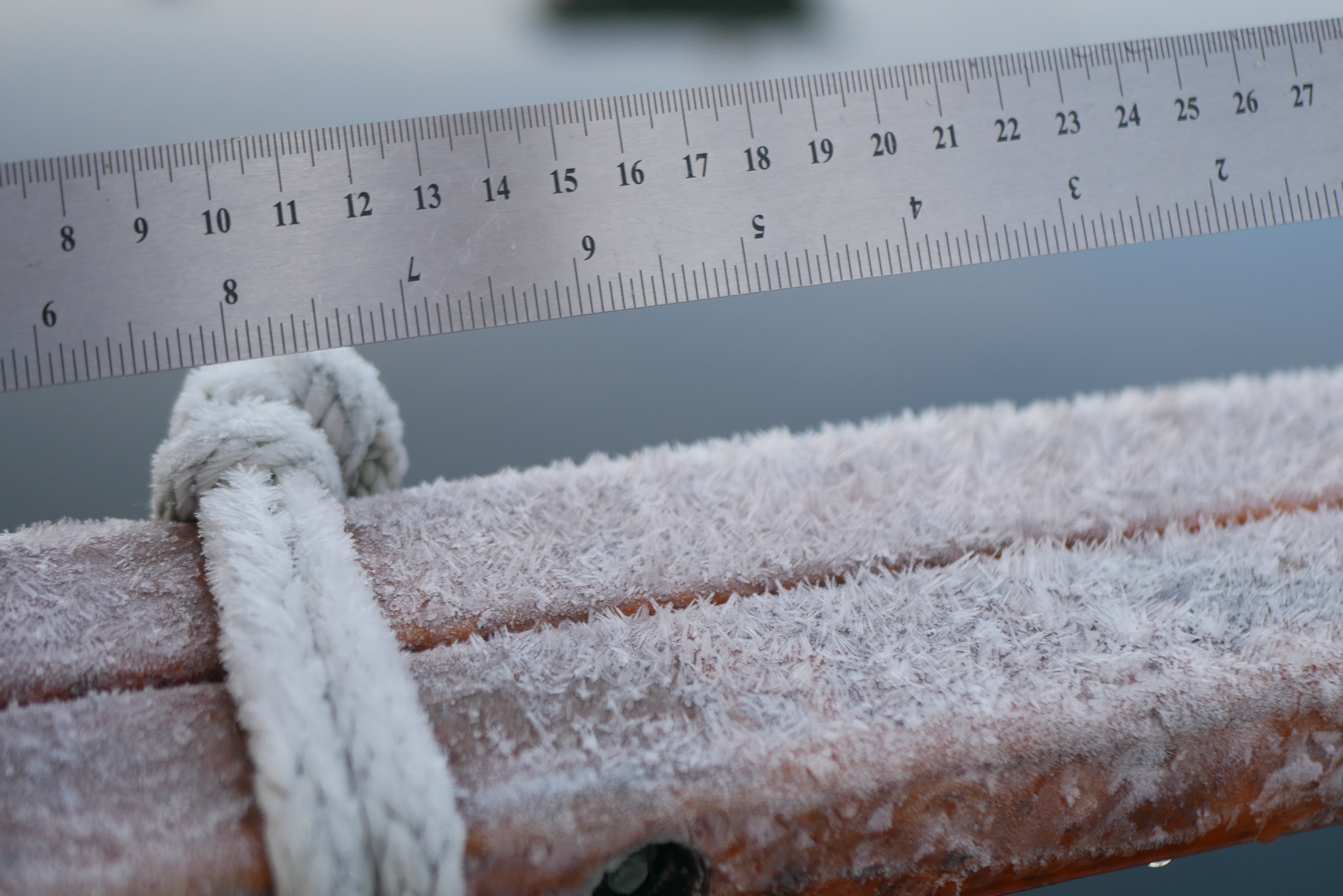
Air Hoar with ruler for scale

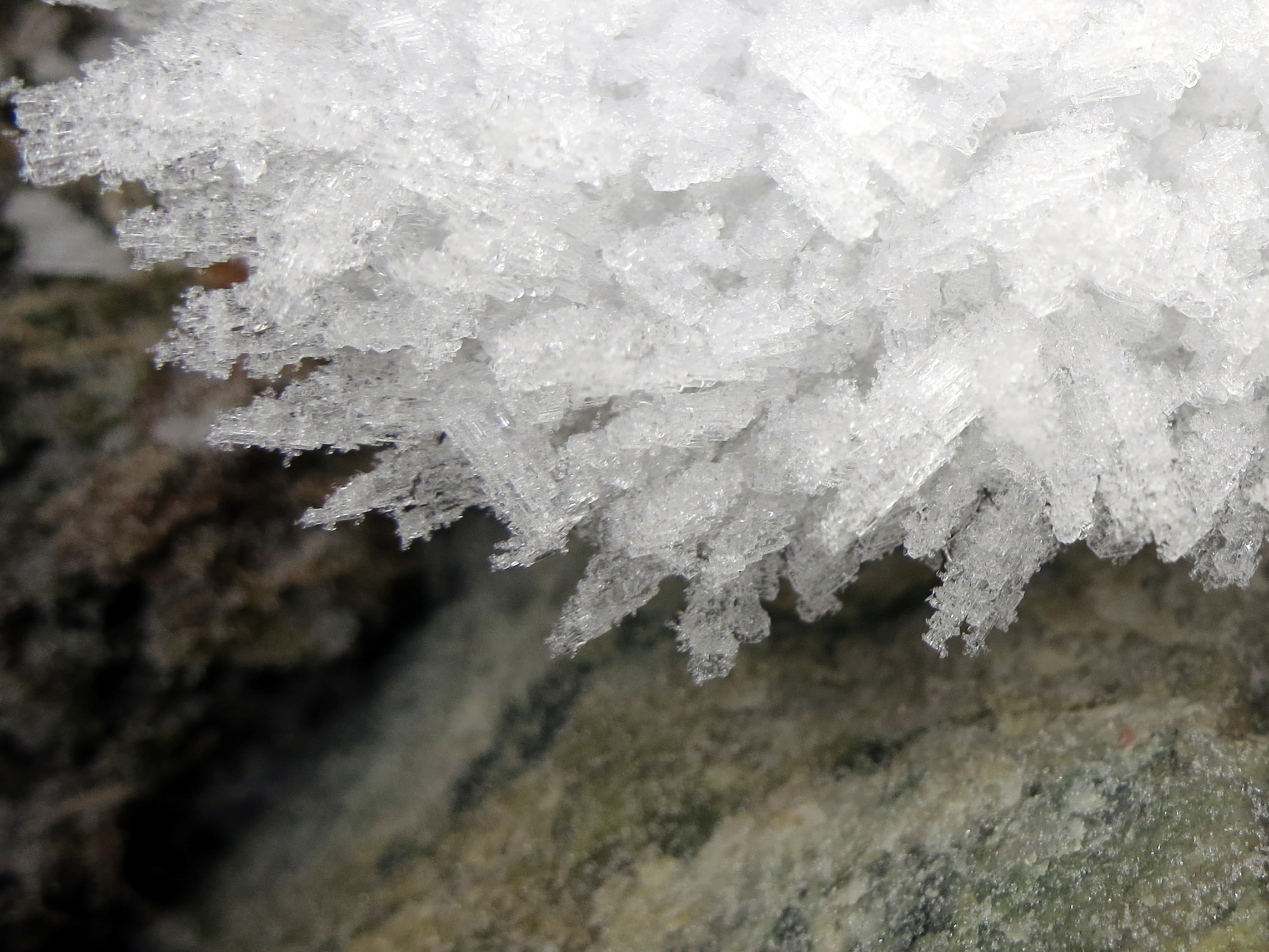
Fern-like Surface Hoar

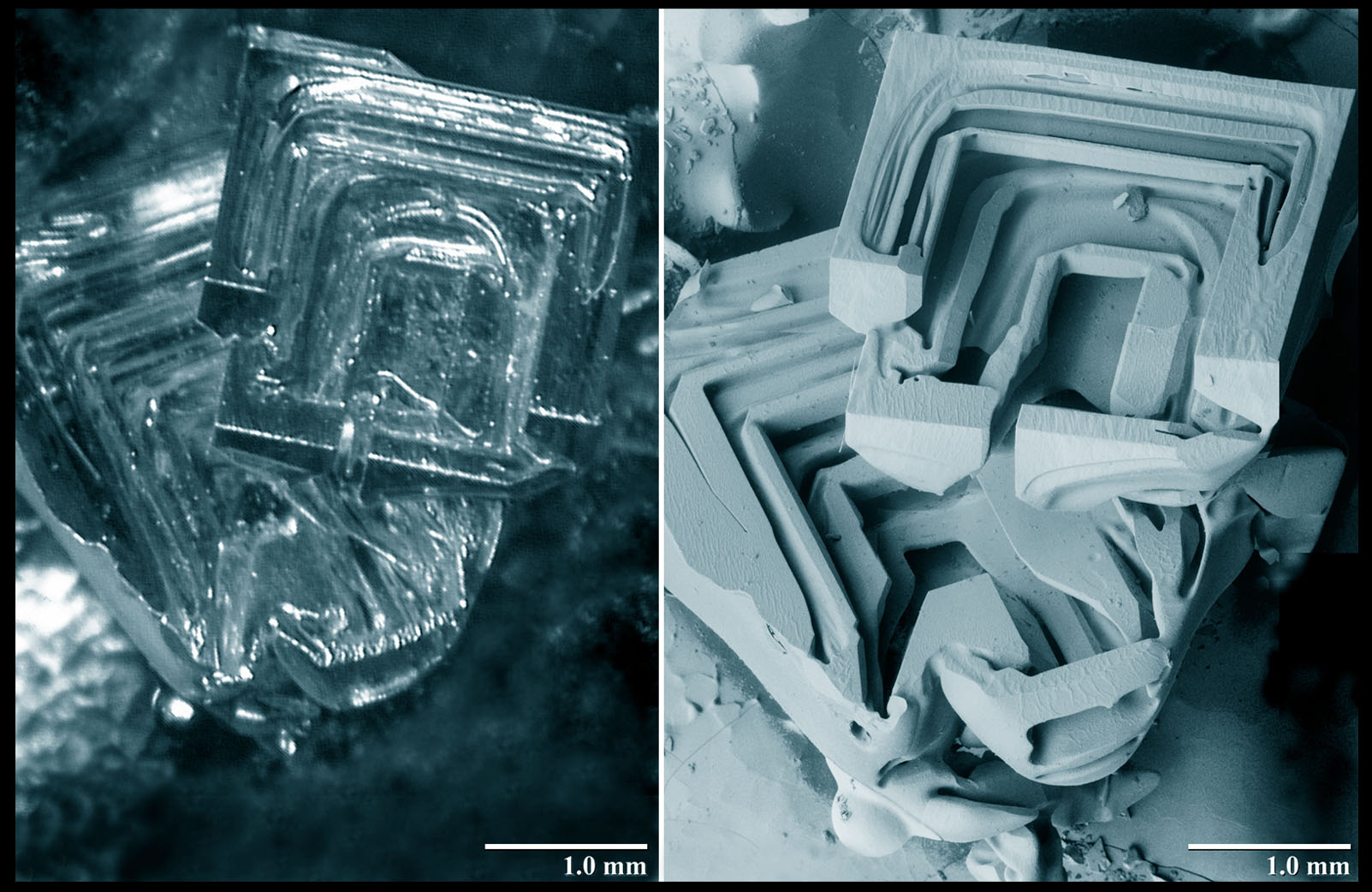
Depth hoar, imaged with optical (left) and scanning electron (right) microscopy

Hoar frost, also hoarfrost, radiation frost, or pruina, refers to white ice crystals deposited on the ground or loosely attached to exposed objects, such as wires or leaves. They form on cold, clear nights when conditions are such that heat radiates into outer space faster than it can be replaced from nearby warm objects or brought in by the wind. Under suitable circumstances, objects cool to below the frost point of the surrounding air, well below the freezing point of water. Such freezing may be promoted by effects such as flood frost or frost pocket. These occur when ground-level radiation cools air until it flows downhill and accumulates in pockets of very cold air in valleys and hollows. Hoar frost may freeze in such low-lying cold air even when the air temperature a few feet above ground is well above freezing.

The word "hoar" comes from an Old English adjective that means "showing signs of old age". In this context, it refers to the frost that makes trees and bushes look like white hair.

Hoar frost may have different names depending on where it forms:

- Air hoar is a deposit of hoar frost on objects above the surface, such as tree branches, plant stems, and wires.
- Surface hoar refers to fern-like ice crystals directly deposited on snow, ice, or already frozen surfaces.
- Crevasse hoar consists of crystals that form in glacial crevasses where water vapour can accumulate under calm weather conditions.
- Depth hoar refers to faceted crystals that have slowly grown large within cavities beneath the surface of banks of dry snow. Depth hoar crystals grow continuously at the expense of neighbouring smaller crystals, so typically are visibly stepped and have faceted hollows.

When surface hoar covers sloping snowbanks, the layer of frost crystals may create an avalanche risk; when heavy layers of new snow cover the frosty surface, furry crystals standing out from the old snow hold off the falling flakes, forming a layer of voids that prevents the new snow layers from bonding strongly to the old snow beneath. Ideal conditions for hoarfrost to form on snow are cold, clear nights, with very light, cold air currents conveying humidity at the right rate for growth of frost crystals. Wind that is too strong or warm destroys the furry crystals, and thereby may permit a stronger bond between the old and new snow layers. However, if the winds are strong enough and cold enough to lay the crystals flat and dry, carpeting the snow with cold, loose crystals without removing or destroying them or letting them warm up and become sticky, then the frost interface between the snow layers may still present an avalanche danger, because the texture of the frost crystals differs from the snow texture, and the dry crystals will not stick to fresh snow. Such conditions still prevent a strong bond between the snow layers.

In very low temperatures where fluffy surface hoar crystals form without subsequently being covered with snow, strong winds may break them off, forming a dust of ice particles and blowing them over the surface. The ice dust then may form yukimarimo, as has been observed in parts of Antarctica, in a process similar to the formation of dust bunnies and similar structures.

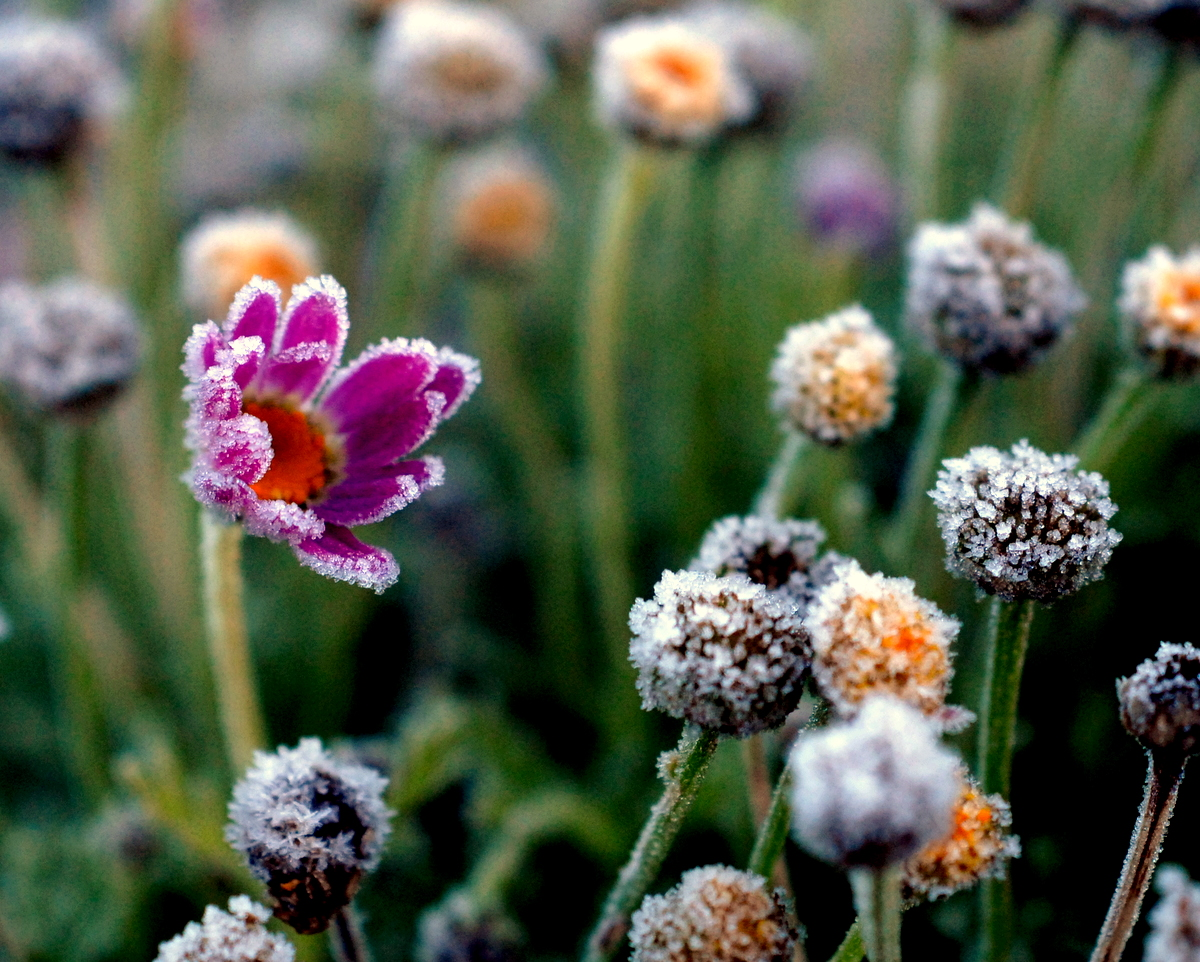
A flower with advection frost on the edges of its petals

Hoar frost and white frost also occur in man-made environments such as in freezers or industrial cold-storage facilities. If such cold spaces or the pipes serving them are not well insulated and are exposed to ambient humidity, the moisture will freeze instantly depending on the freezer temperature. The frost may coat pipes thickly, partly insulating them, but such inefficient insulation still is a source of heat loss.

=== Advection frost ===
Advection frost (also called wind frost) refers to tiny ice spikes that form when very cold wind is blowing over tree branches, poles, and other surfaces. It looks like rimming on the edges of flowers and leaves, and usually forms against the direction of the wind. It can occur at any hour, day or night.

=== Window frost ===
Window frost (also called fern frost or ice flowers) forms when a glass pane is exposed to very cold air on the outside and warmer, moderately moist air on the inside. If the pane is a bad insulator (for example, if it is a single-pane window), water vapour condenses on the glass, forming frost patterns. With very low temperatures outside, frost can appear on the bottom of the window even with double-pane energy-efficient windows because the air convection between two panes of glass ensures that the bottom part of the glazing unit is colder than the top part. On unheated motor vehicles, the frost usually forms on the outside surface of the glass first. The glass surface influences the shape of crystals, so imperfections, scratches, or dust can modify the way ice nucleates. The patterns in window frost form a fractal with a fractal dimension greater than one, but less than two. This is a consequence of the nucleation process being constrained to unfold in two dimensions, unlike a snowflake, which is shaped by a similar process, but forms in three dimensions and has a fractal dimension greater than two.

If the indoor air is very humid, rather than moderately so, water first condenses in small droplets, and then freezes into clear ice.

Similar patterns of freezing may occur on other smooth vertical surfaces, but they seldom are as obvious or spectacular as on clear glass.

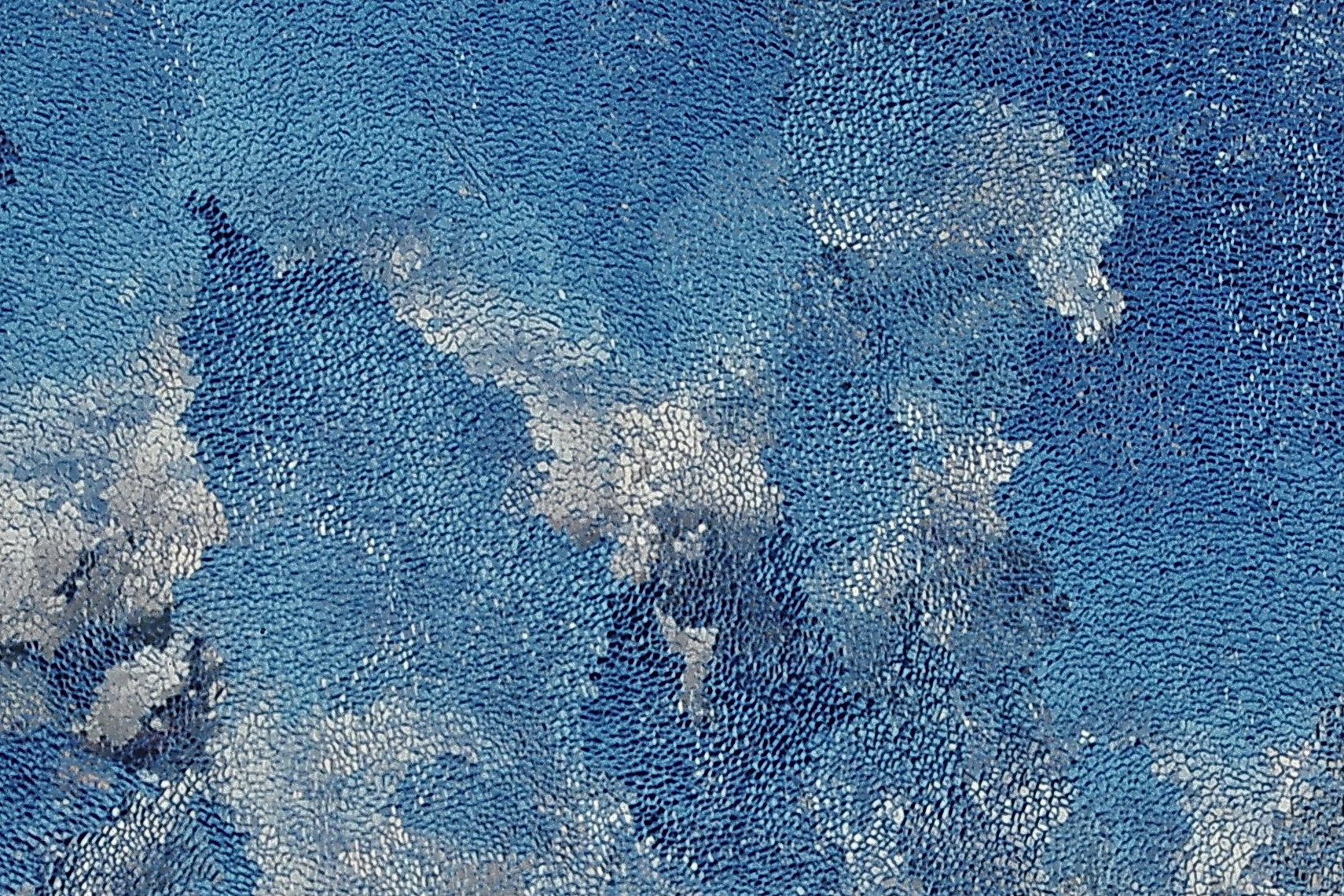

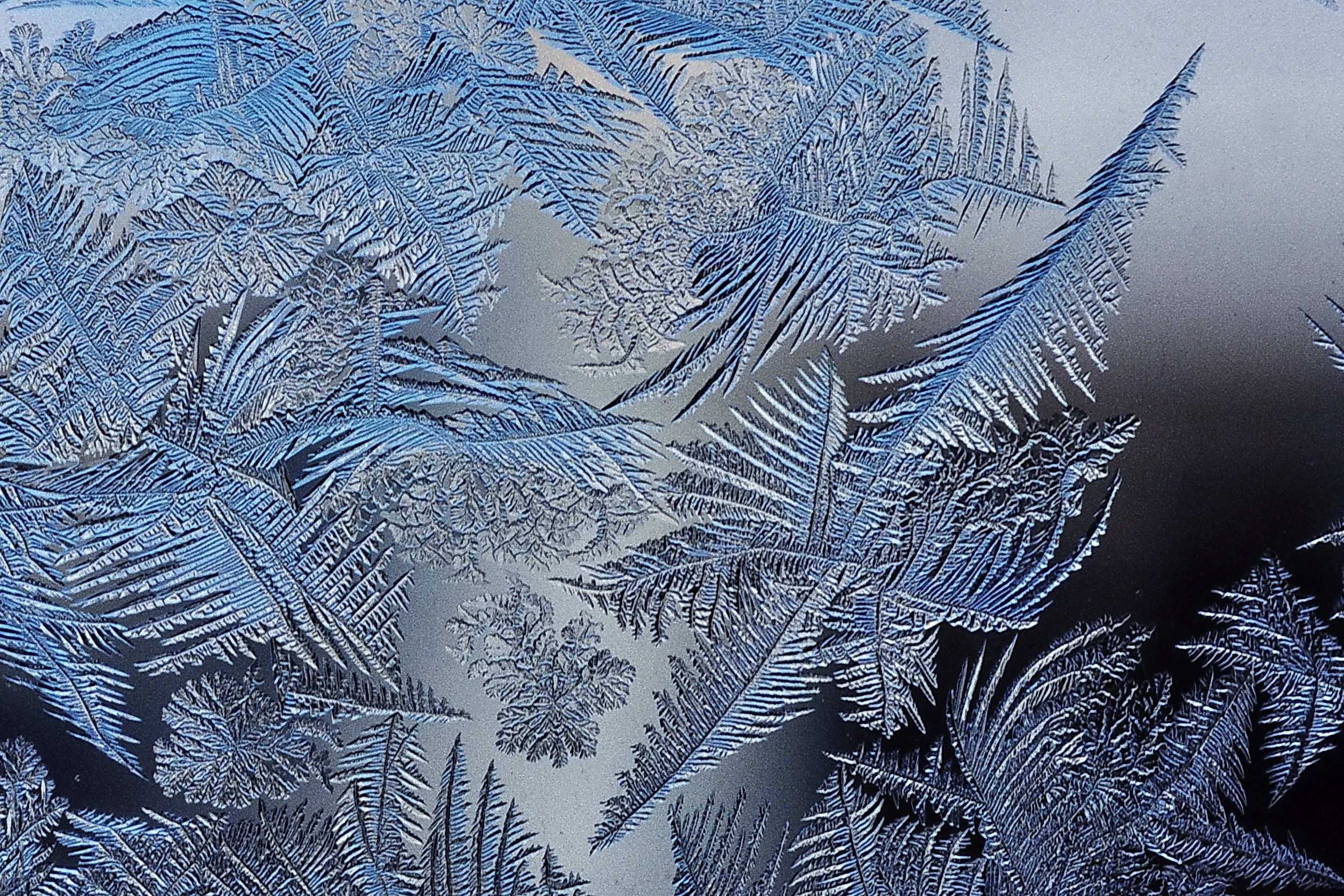

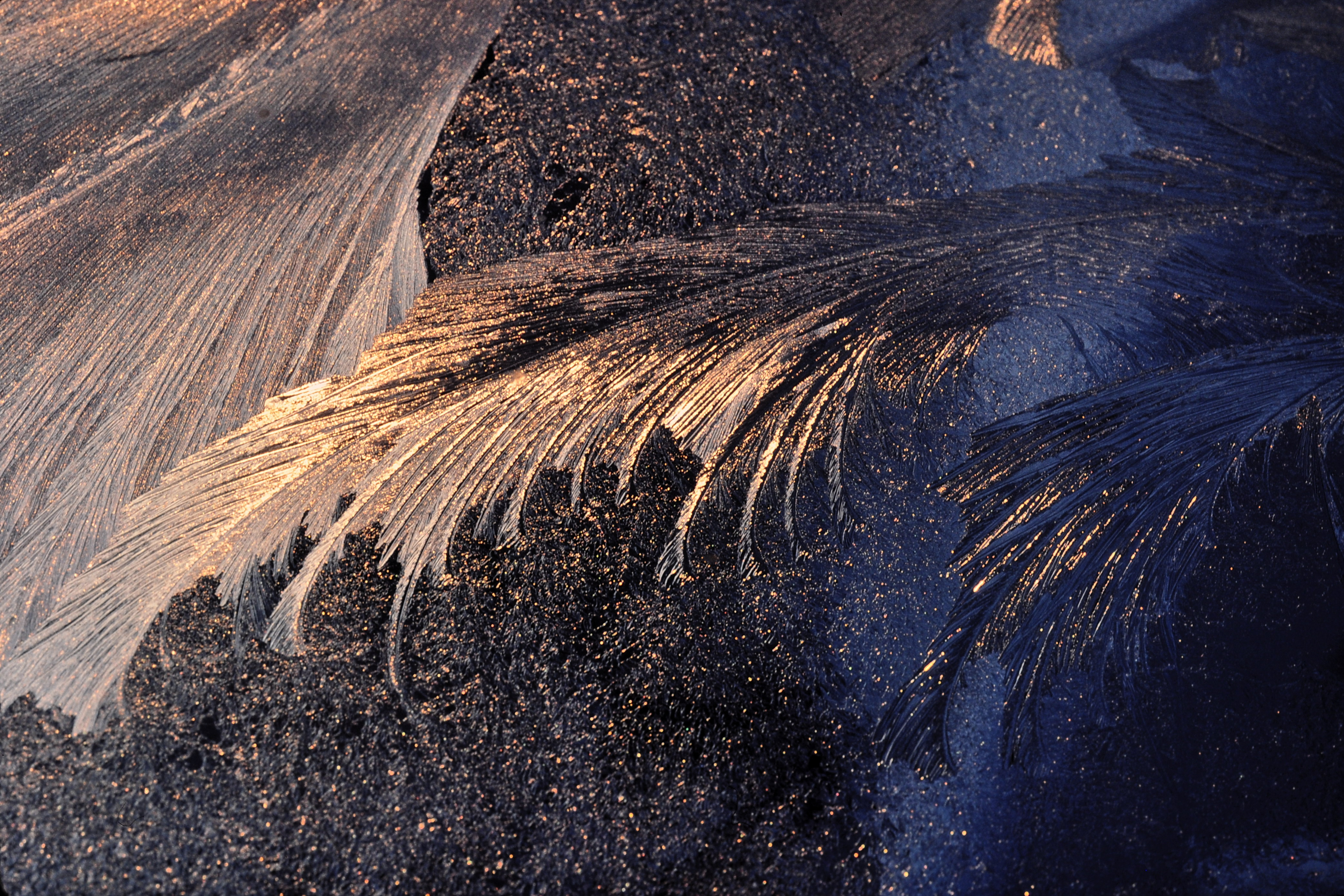

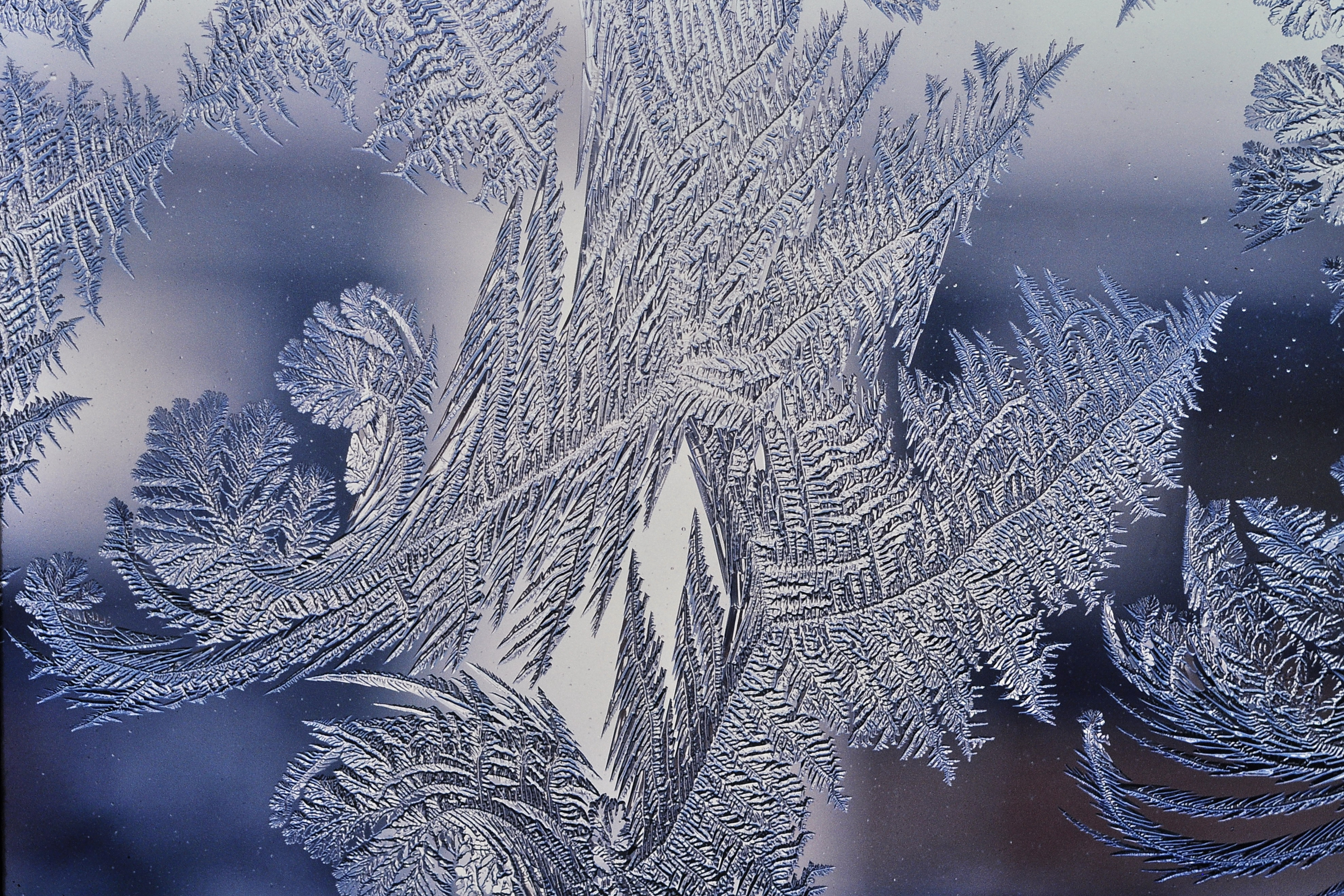

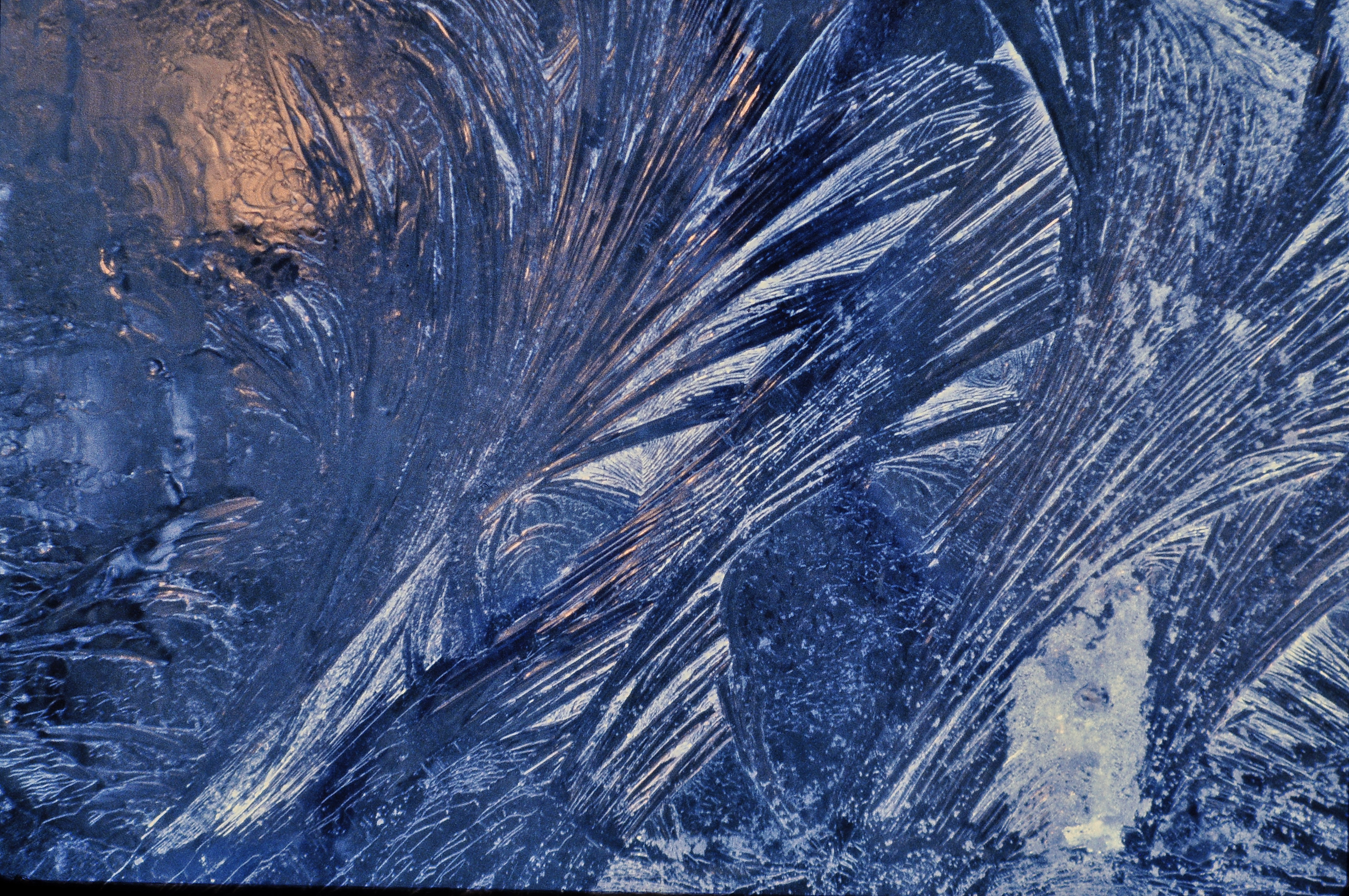

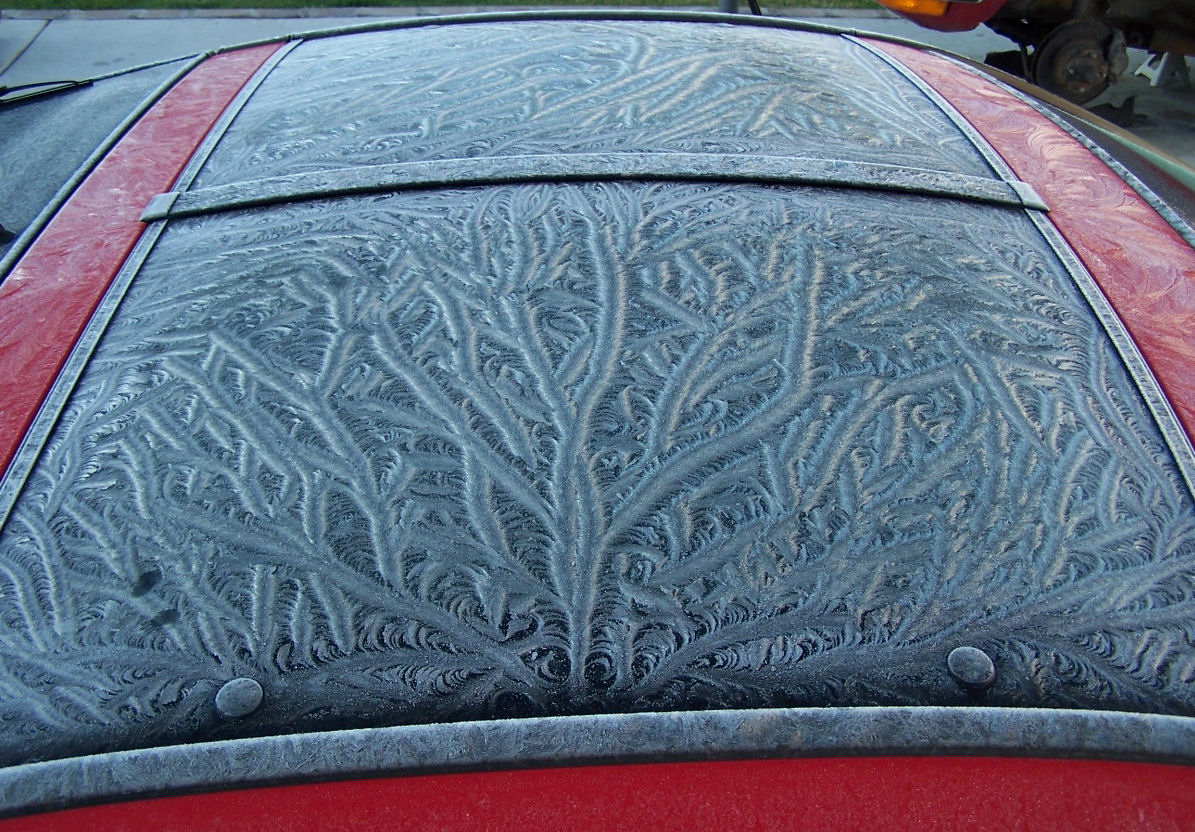

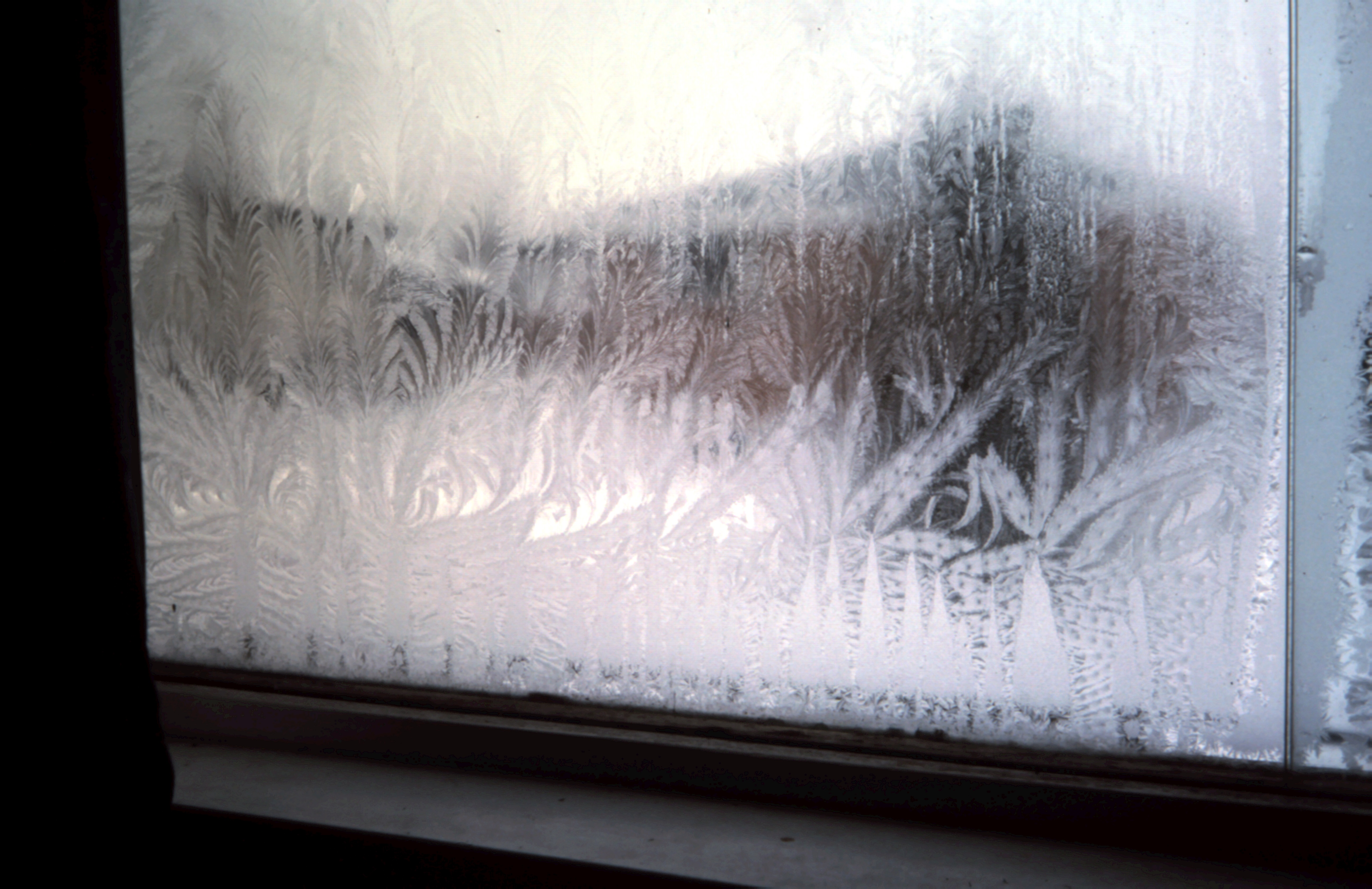

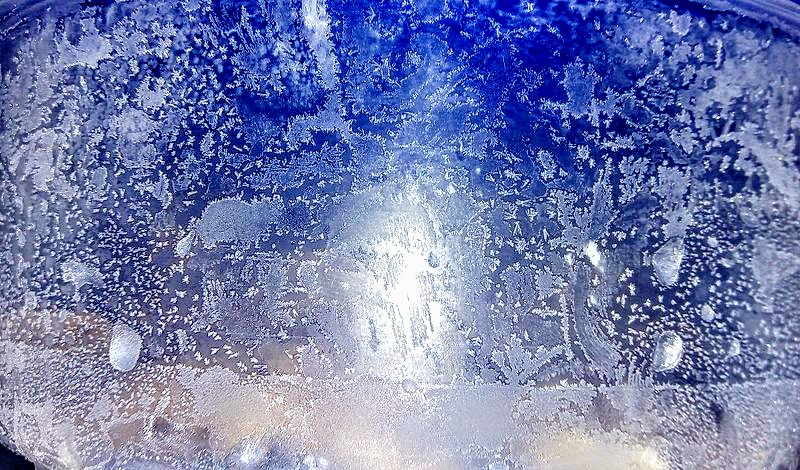

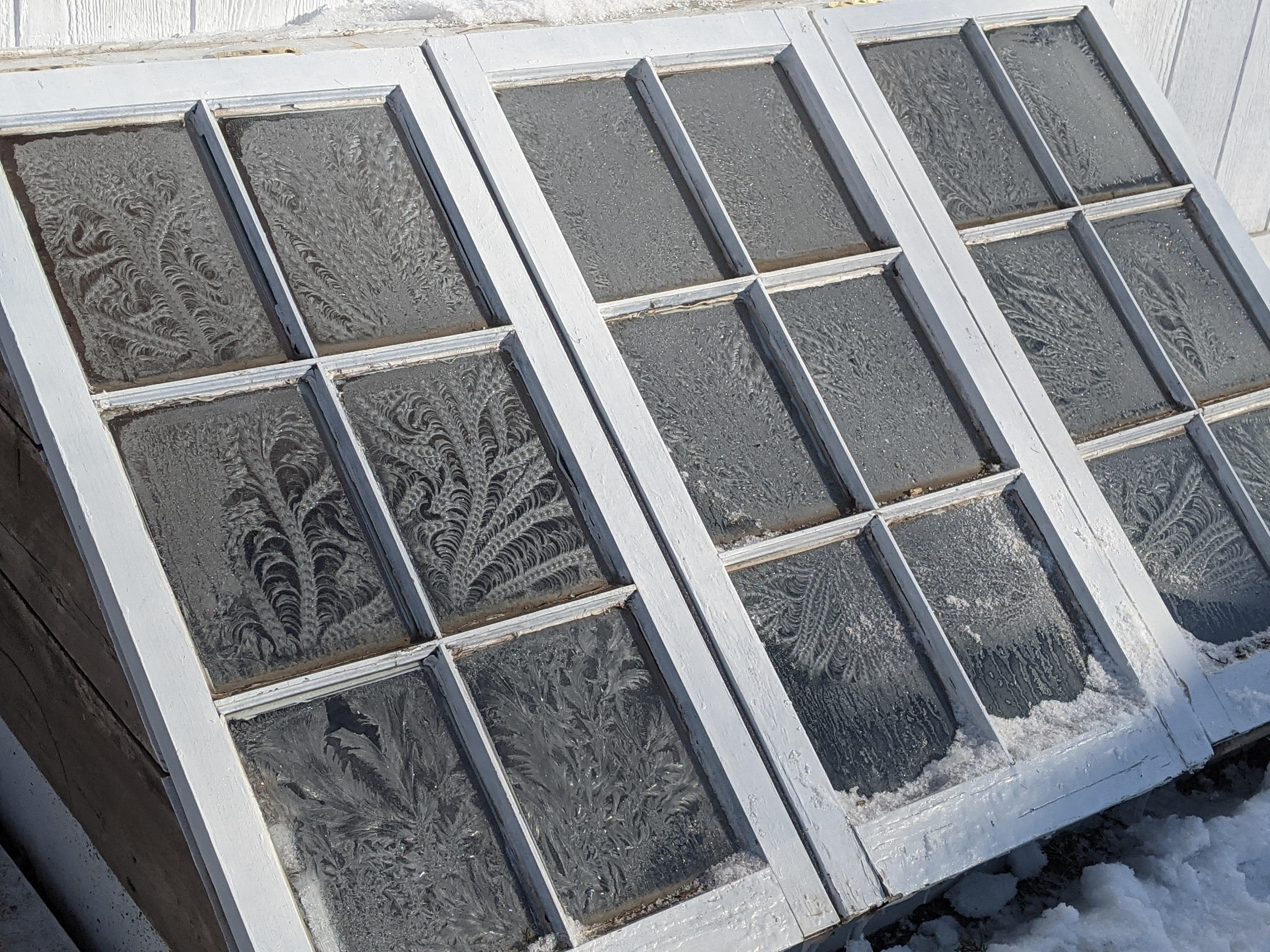

=== White frost ===
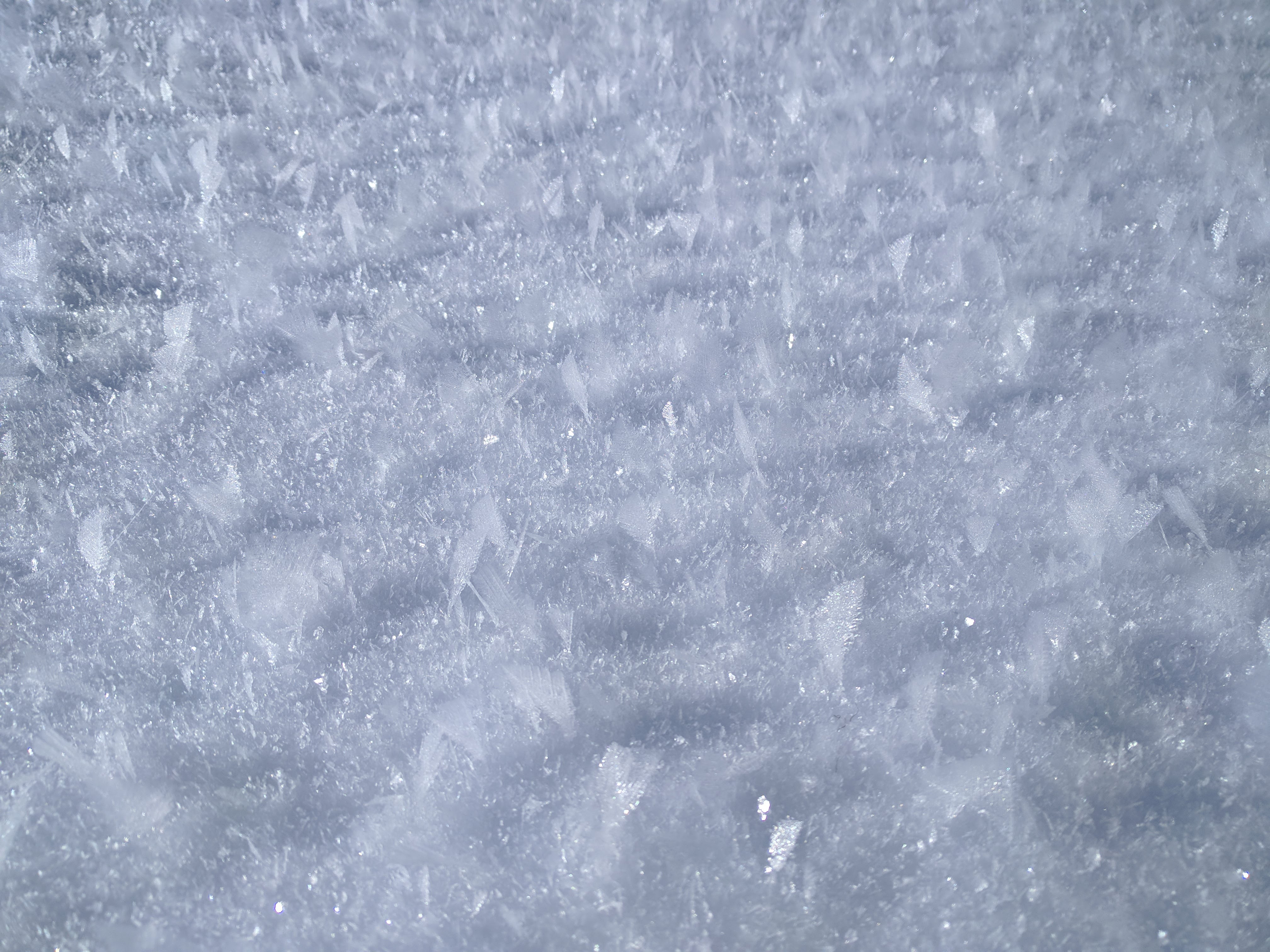
White frost on the snow

White frost is a solid deposition of ice that forms directly on snow surfaces from water vapour contained in air.

White frost forms when relative humidity is above 90% and the temperature below −8 °C (18 °F), and it grows against the wind direction, since air arriving from windward has a higher humidity than leeward air, but the wind must not be strong, else it damages the delicate icy structures as they begin to form. White frost resembles a heavy coating of hoar frost with big, interlocking crystals, usually needle-shaped.

=== Rime ===
Rime is a type of ice deposition that occurs quickly, often under heavily humid and windy conditions. Technically speaking, it is not a type of frost, since usually supercooled water drops are involved, in contrast to the formation of hoar frost, in which water vapour desublimates slowly and directly. Ships travelling through Arctic seas may accumulate large quantities of rime on the rigging. Unlike hoar frost, which has a feathery appearance, rime generally has an icy, solid appearance.

=== Black frost ===
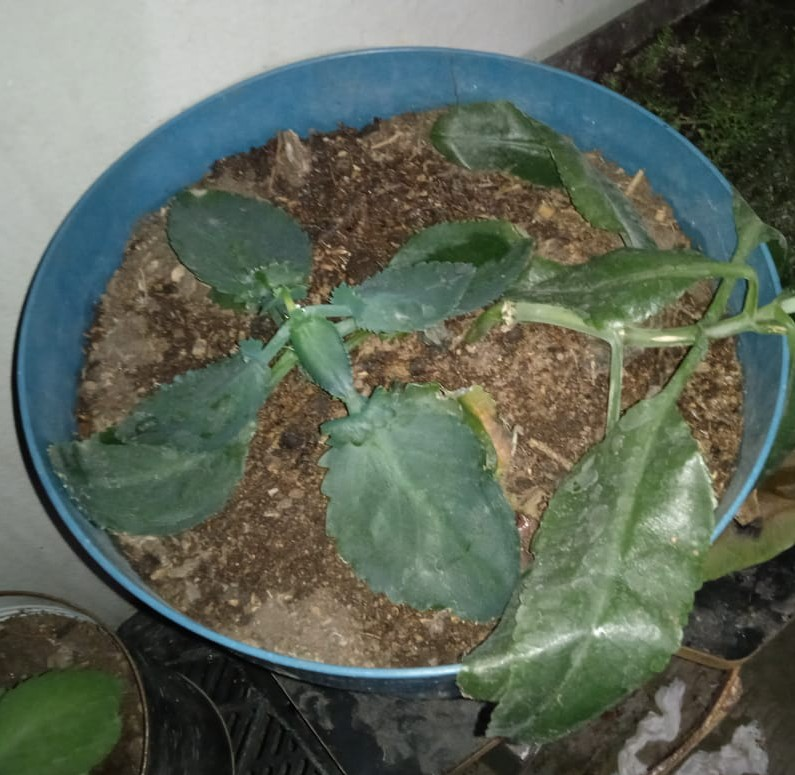
Dead plant leaves during Winter Storm Uri in a backyard in Northern Mexico, with below freezing temperatures.

Black frost (or "killing frost") is not strictly speaking frost at all, because it is the condition seen in crops when the humidity is too low for frost to form, but the temperature falls so low that plant tissues freeze and die, becoming blackened, hence the term "black frost". Black frost often is called "killing frost" because white frost tends to be less cold, partly because the latent heat of freezing of the water reduces the temperature drop.

== Effect on plants ==
=== Damage ===
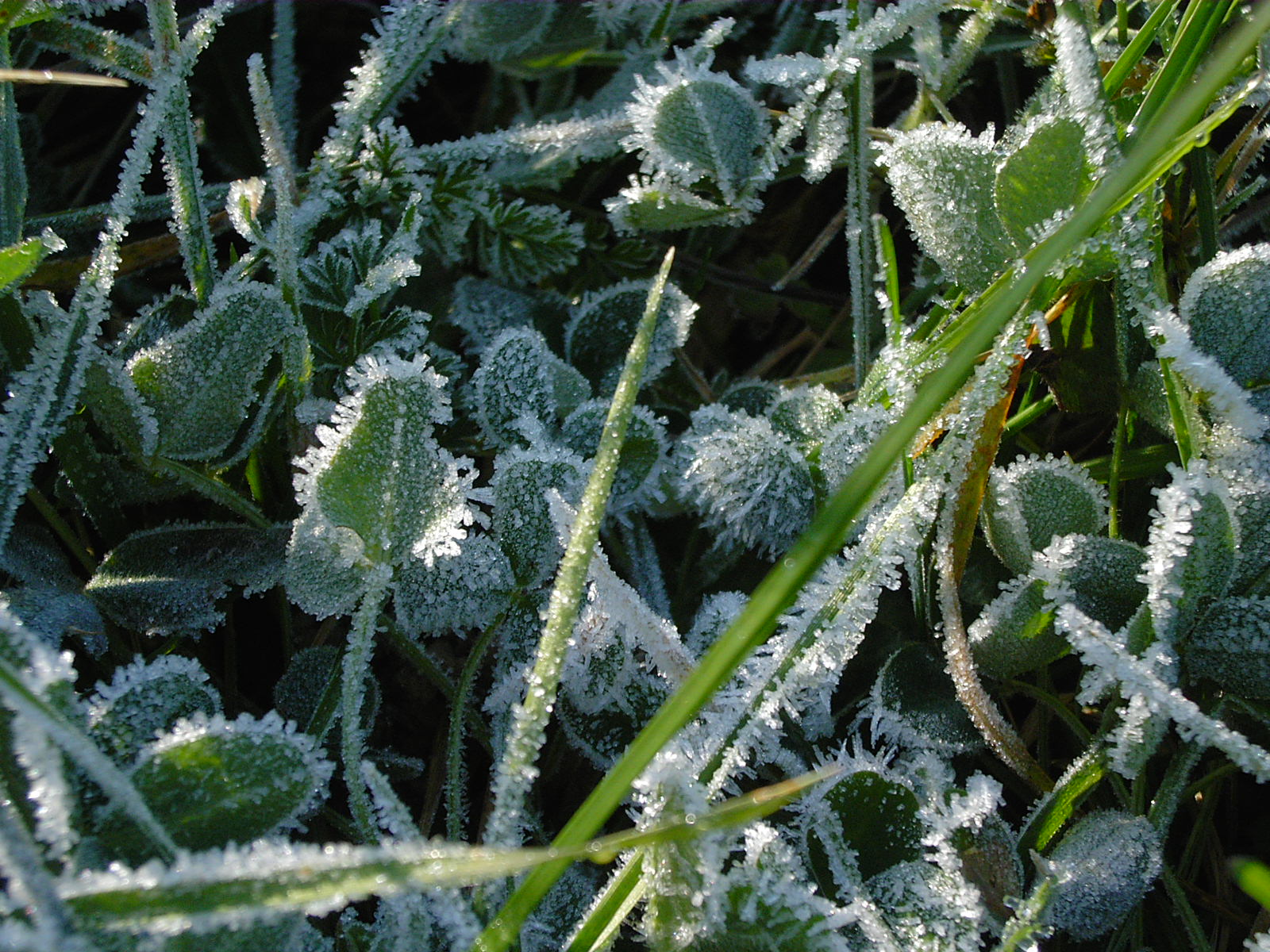
Frost on the grass of a public park in November

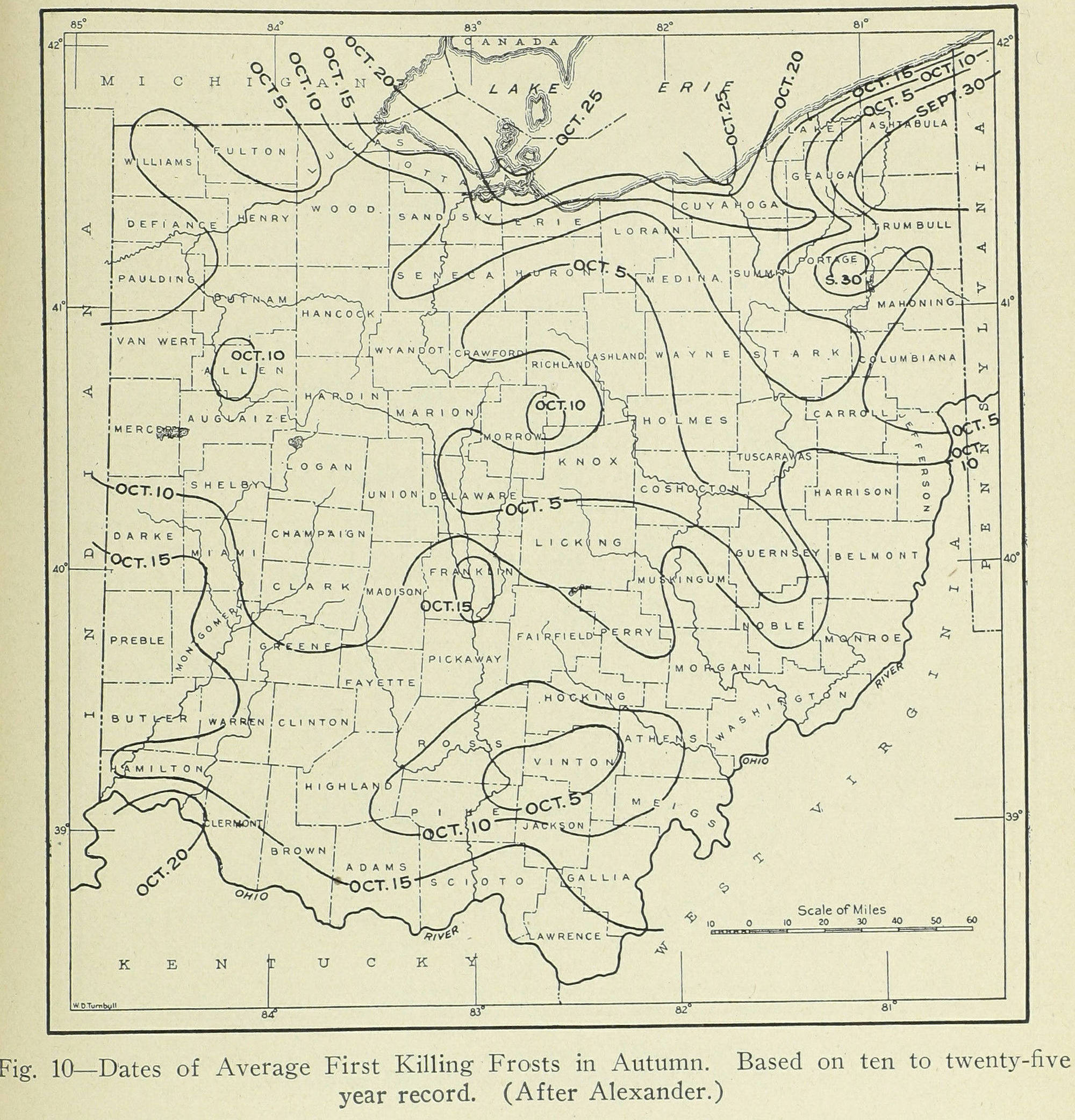
Map of average first killing frost in Ohio from "Geography of Ohio," 1923

Many plants can be damaged or killed by freezing temperatures or frost. This varies with the type of plant, the tissue exposed, and how low temperatures get; a "light frost" of −2 to 0 °C (28 to 32 °F) damages fewer types of plants than a "hard frost" below −2 °C (28 °F).

Plants likely to be damaged even by a light frost include vines—such as beans, grapes, squashes, melons—along with nightshades such as tomatoes, eggplants, and peppers. Plants that may tolerate (or even benefit from) frosts include:

- root vegetables (e.g. beets, carrots, parsnips, onions)
- leafy greens (e.g. lettuces, spinach, chard, cucumber)
- cruciferous vegetables (e.g. cabbages, cauliflower, bok choy, broccoli, Brussels sprouts, radishes, kale, collard, mustard, turnips, rutabagas)

Even those plants that tolerate frost may be damaged once temperatures drop even lower (below −4 °C or 25 °F). Hardy perennials, such as Hosta, become dormant after the first frosts and regrow when spring arrives. The entire visible plant may turn completely brown until the spring warmth, or may drop all of its leaves and flowers, leaving the stem and stalk only. Evergreen plants, such as pine trees, withstand frost although all or most growth stops. Frost crack is a bark defect caused by a combination of low temperatures and heat from the winter sun.

Vegetation is not necessarily damaged when leaf temperatures drop below the freezing point of their cell contents. In the absence of a site nucleating the formation of ice crystals, the leaves remain in a supercooled liquid state, safely reaching temperatures of −4 to −12 °C (25 to 10 °F). However, once frost forms, the leaf cells may be damaged by sharp ice crystals. Hardening is the process by which a plant becomes tolerant to low temperatures. See also Cryobiology.

Certain bacteria, notably Pseudomonas syringae, are particularly effective at triggering frost formation, raising the nucleation temperature to about −2 °C (28 °F). Bacteria lacking ice nucleation-active proteins (ice-minus bacteria) result in greatly reduced frost damage.

=== Protection methods ===
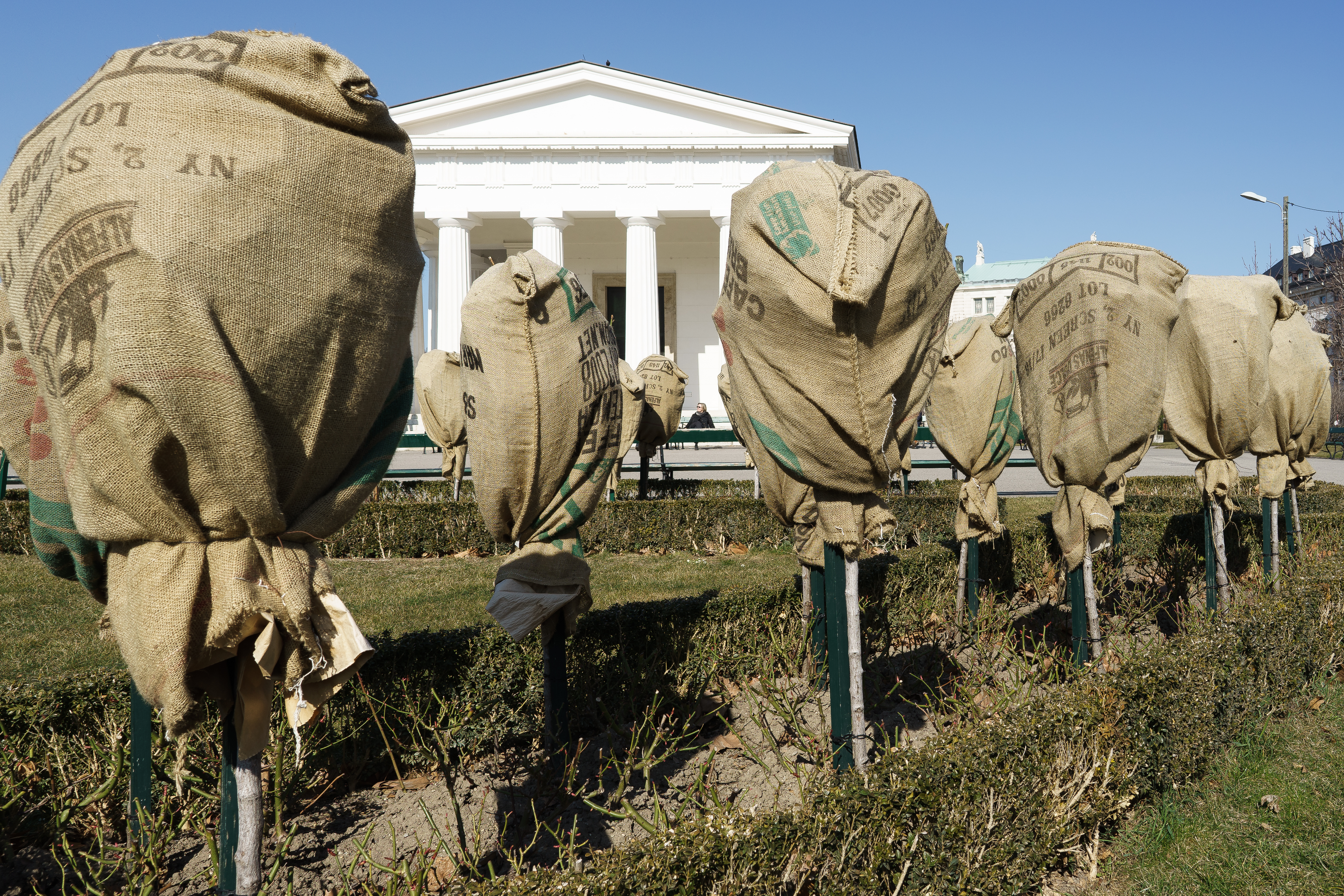
Roses with protection against frost – Volksgarten, Vienna

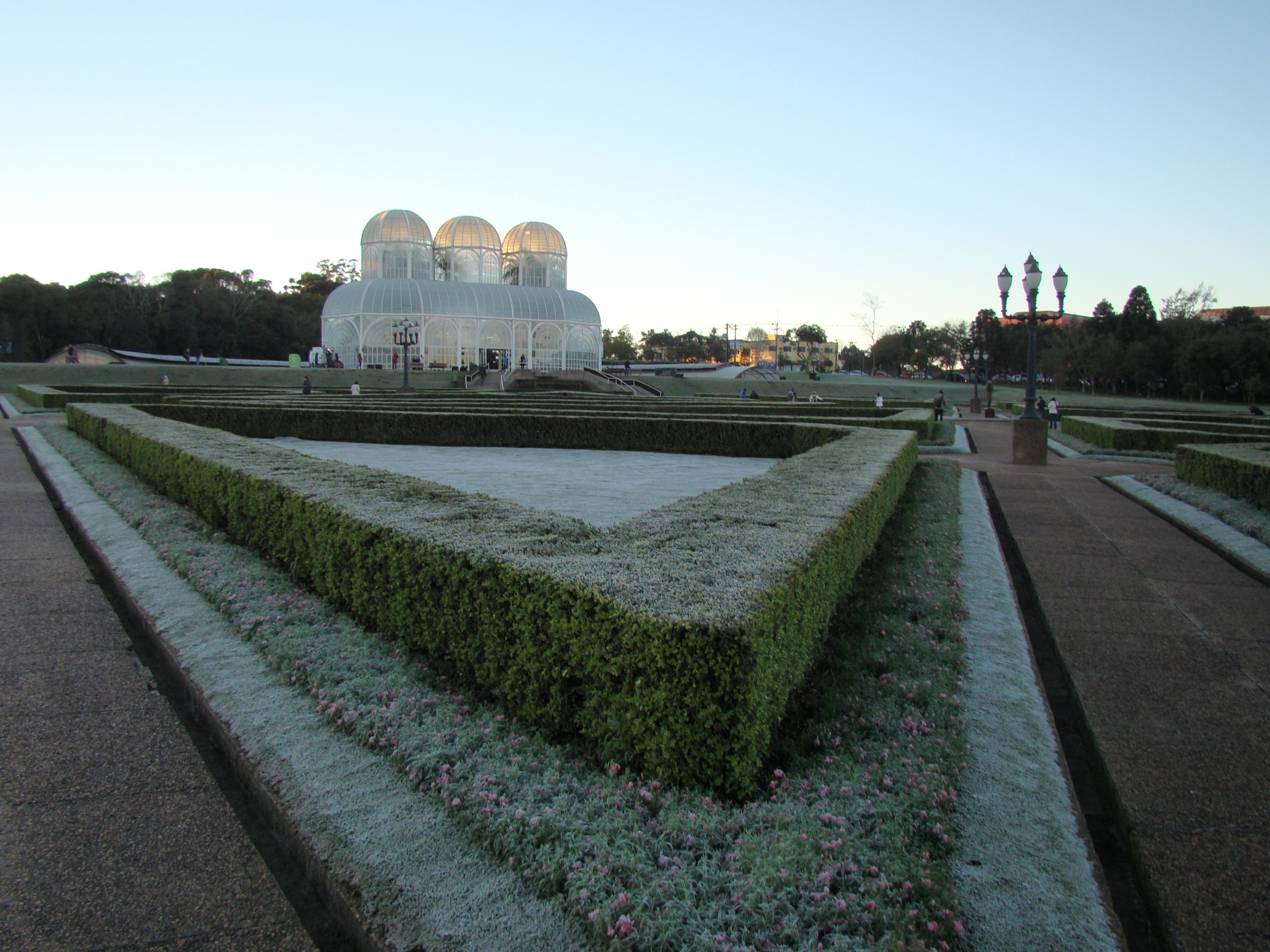
Curitiba (Southern Brazil) is the coldest of Brazil's state capitals; the greenhouse of the Botanical Garden of Curitiba protects sensitive plants.

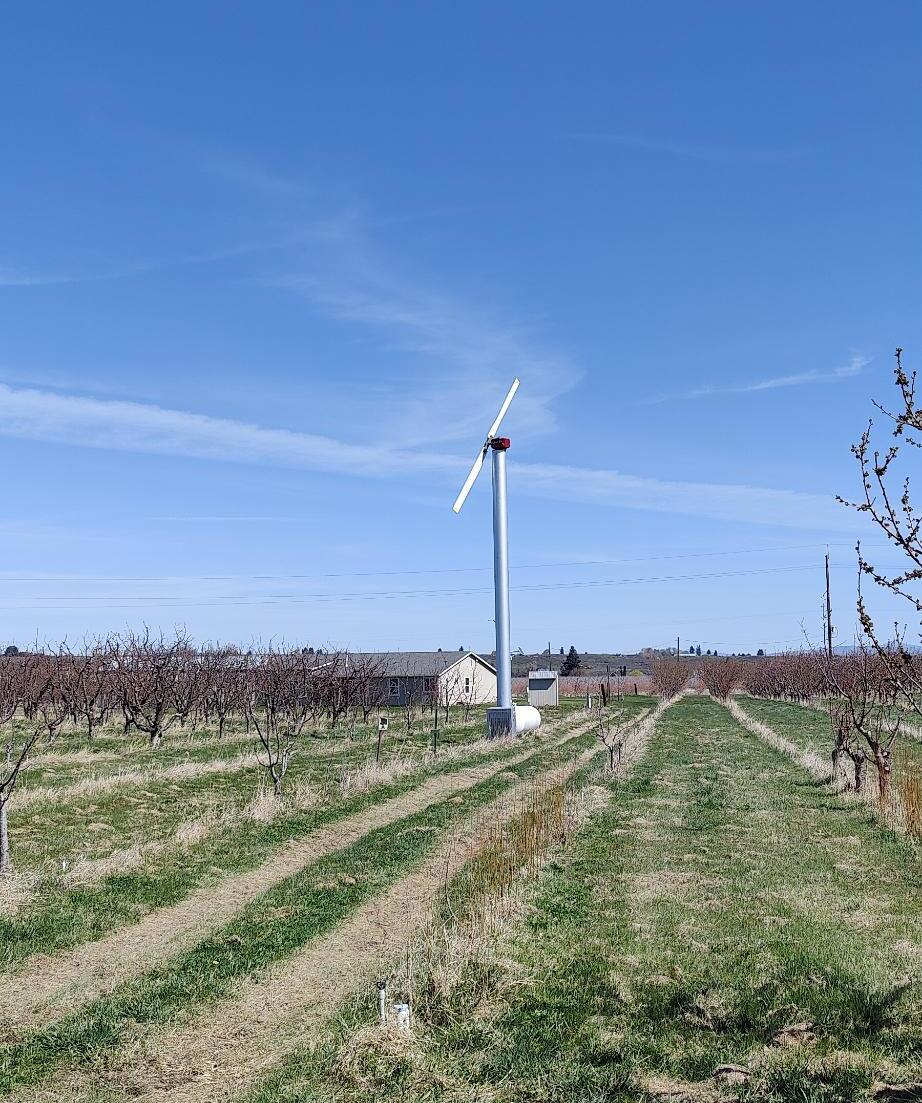
Frost protection fan, a type of wind machine, in an orchard near Yakima, WA

Typical measures to prevent frost or reduce its severity include one or more of:

- Deploying powerful blowers to simulate wind, thereby preventing the formation of accumulations of cold air. There are variations on this theme. One variety is the wind machine, an engine-driven propeller mounted on a vertical pole that blows air almost horizontally. Wind machines were introduced as a method for frost protection in California during the 1920s, but they were not widely accepted until the 1940s and 1950s. Now, they are commonly used in many parts of the world. Another is the selective inverted sink, a device which prevents frost by drawing cold air from the ground and blowing it up through a chimney. It was originally developed to prevent frost damage to citrus fruits in Uruguay. In New Zealand, helicopters are used in similar fashion, especially in the vineyard regions such as Marlborough. By dragging down warmer air from the inversion layers, and preventing the ponding of colder air on the ground, the low-flying helicopters prevent damage to the fruit buds. As the operations are conducted at night, and have in the past involved up to 130 aircraft per night in one region, safety rules are strict. Although not a dedicated method, wind turbines have a similar (although smaller) effect of vertically mixing air layers of different temperature.
- For high-value crops, farmers may wrap trees and use physical crop coverings.
- For high-value crops grown over small areas, heating to slow the drop in temperature may be practical.
- Production of smoke to reduce cooling by radiation, now thought to be of little benefit.
- Spraying crops with a layer of water. An effective, low-cost method for small crop farms and plant nurseries, this technique exploits the latent heat of freezing. A pulsed irrigation timer delivers water through existing overhead sprinklers at a low volumes to combat frosts down to −5 °C (23 °F). The water gives off latent heat as it freezes, preventing the temperature of the foliage from falling much below zero.

Such measures need to be applied with discretion, as they may do more harm than good; for example, spraying crops with water can cause damage if the plants become overburdened with ice.

== Frost-free areas ==
Frost-free areas are found mainly in the lowland tropics, where they cover almost all land except at altitudes above about 3,000 metres or 9,800 feet near the equator and around 2,000 metres or 6,600 feet in the semiarid areas in tropical regions. Some areas on the oceanic margins of the subtropics are also frost-free, as are highly oceanic areas near windward coasts. The most poleward frost-free areas are the lower altitudes of the Azores, Île Amsterdam, Île Saint-Paul, and Tristan da Cunha.

In the contiguous United States, southern Florida around Miami Beach and the Florida Keys are the only reliably frost-free areas, as well as the Channel Islands off the coast of California. The hardiness zones in these regions are 11a and 11b.

== Permafrost ==
Permafrost is a layer of frozen earth underground which never heats above freezing even during summer months, remaining frozen year round. Although not frost in the atmospheric sense, it consists of dirt, soil, sand, rocks, clay, or organic matter (peat) bound firmly together by ice crystals, making the material very hard and difficult to penetrate. Permafrost exists in the colder climates of the Arctic and Antarctic, such as Russia, Canada, Alaska, Norway, Greenland, or Antarctica, where the warmer conditions of summer are insufficient to penetrate the insulation of the Earth to reach deep enough to thaw the permafrost layer. The permafrost may begin from the surface of the ground or many meters beneath it, and may extend from just a meter to over a thousand meters in thickness. Permafrost contains a significant portion of the Earth's water and carbon, and prevents surface water from penetrating very deep into the ground, making it responsible in part for the typical taiga and spruce bog environments common in northern latitudes.

== Personifications ==
Frost is personified in Russian culture as Ded Moroz. Indigenous peoples of Russia such as the Mordvins have their own traditions of frost deities.

English folklore tradition holds that Jack Frost, an elfish creature, is responsible for feathery patterns of frost found on windows on cold mornings.

== On other planets ==
Mercury
From March 2011 to April 2015, Neutron Spectrometer data from the NASA MESSENGER mission have provided compelling evidence of water ice and mixtures of sulfur and other light volatile-bearing compounds existing within permanently shadowed craters on Mercury, where extremely cold conditions prevent sublimation. These deposits are interpreted as analogous to frosts locked in cold traps formed by Mercury’s very small axial tilt.

Mars
In 2024, two European Space Agency spacecraft, Exomars TGO and Mars Express, discovered a thin but very wide layer of water frost on the peak of Olympus Mons, the highest mountain on Mars. This layer of frost appears for a few hours around sunrise, and then evaporates into the atmosphere for the rest of the Martian day. This was the first instance of frost discovered in the equatorial region of Mars.

Pluto
In 2015, observations from the NASA New Horizons mission and subsequent studies show that the surface of Pluto is dominated by volatile surface condensation of nitrogen and methane frosts redistributed across Pluto’s surface.

== Gallery ==
Frost

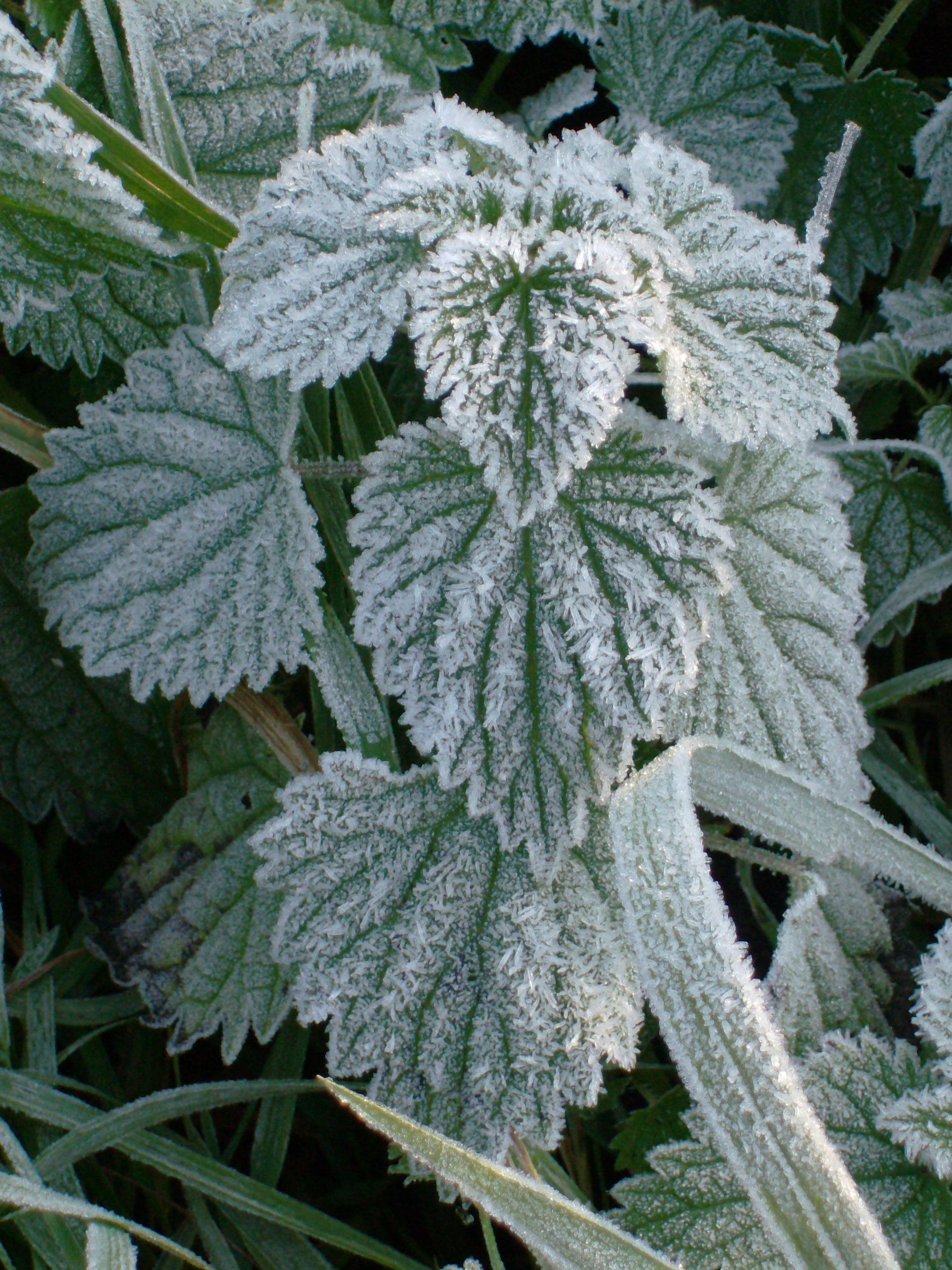
Frost on a nettle

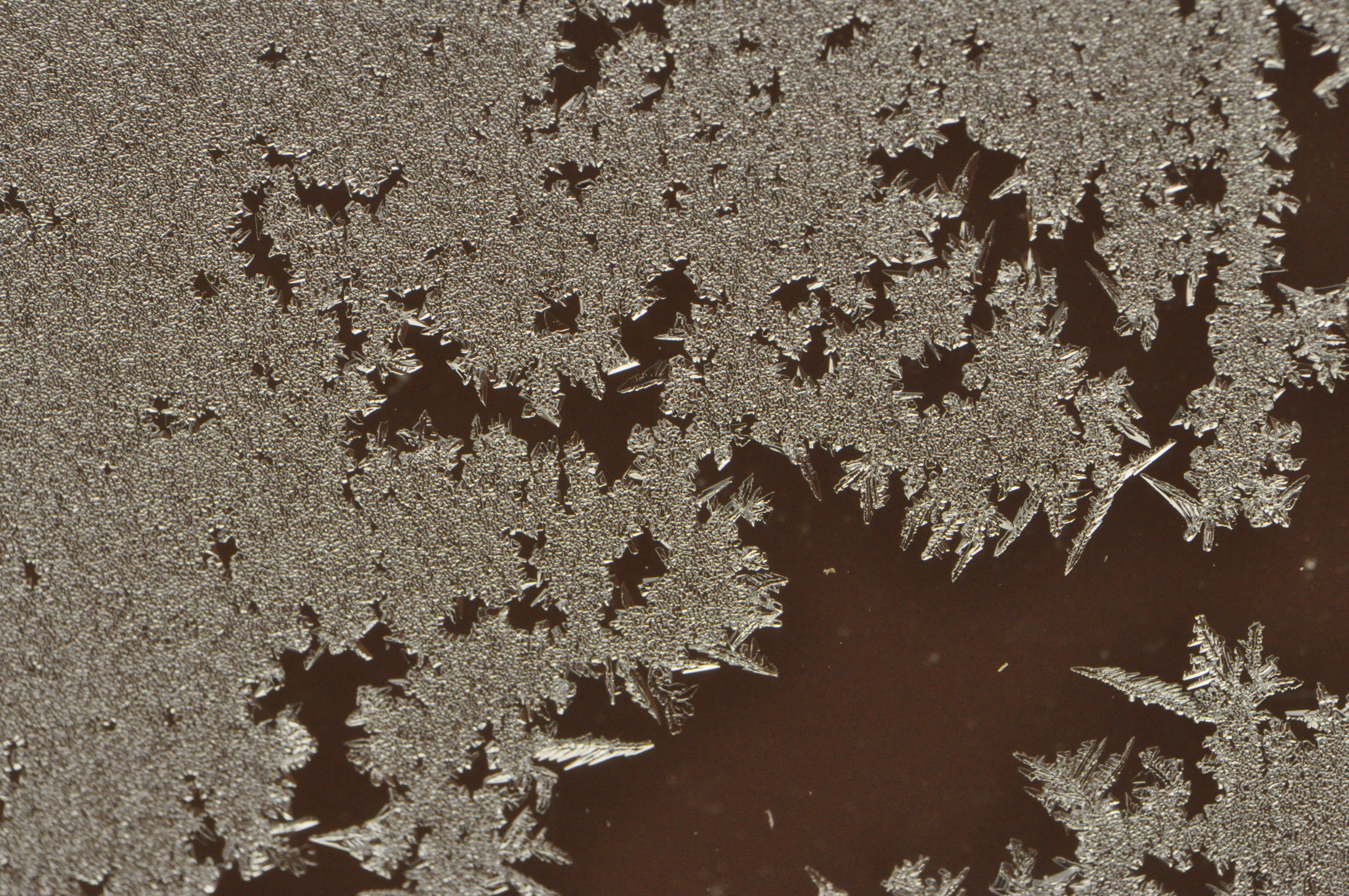
Fern frost on a window

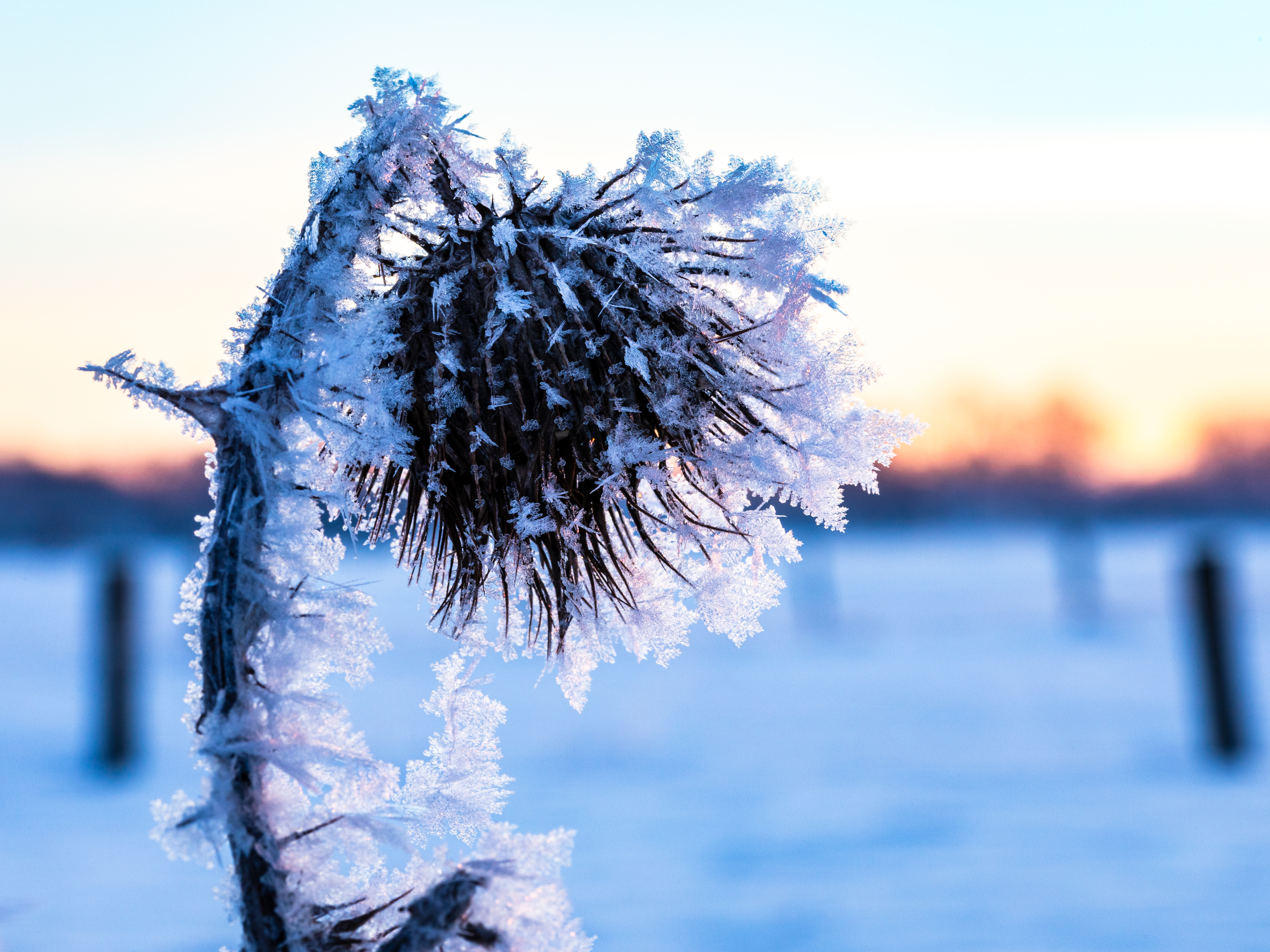
Frost on a thistle in Hausdülmen, North Rhine-Westphalia, Germany

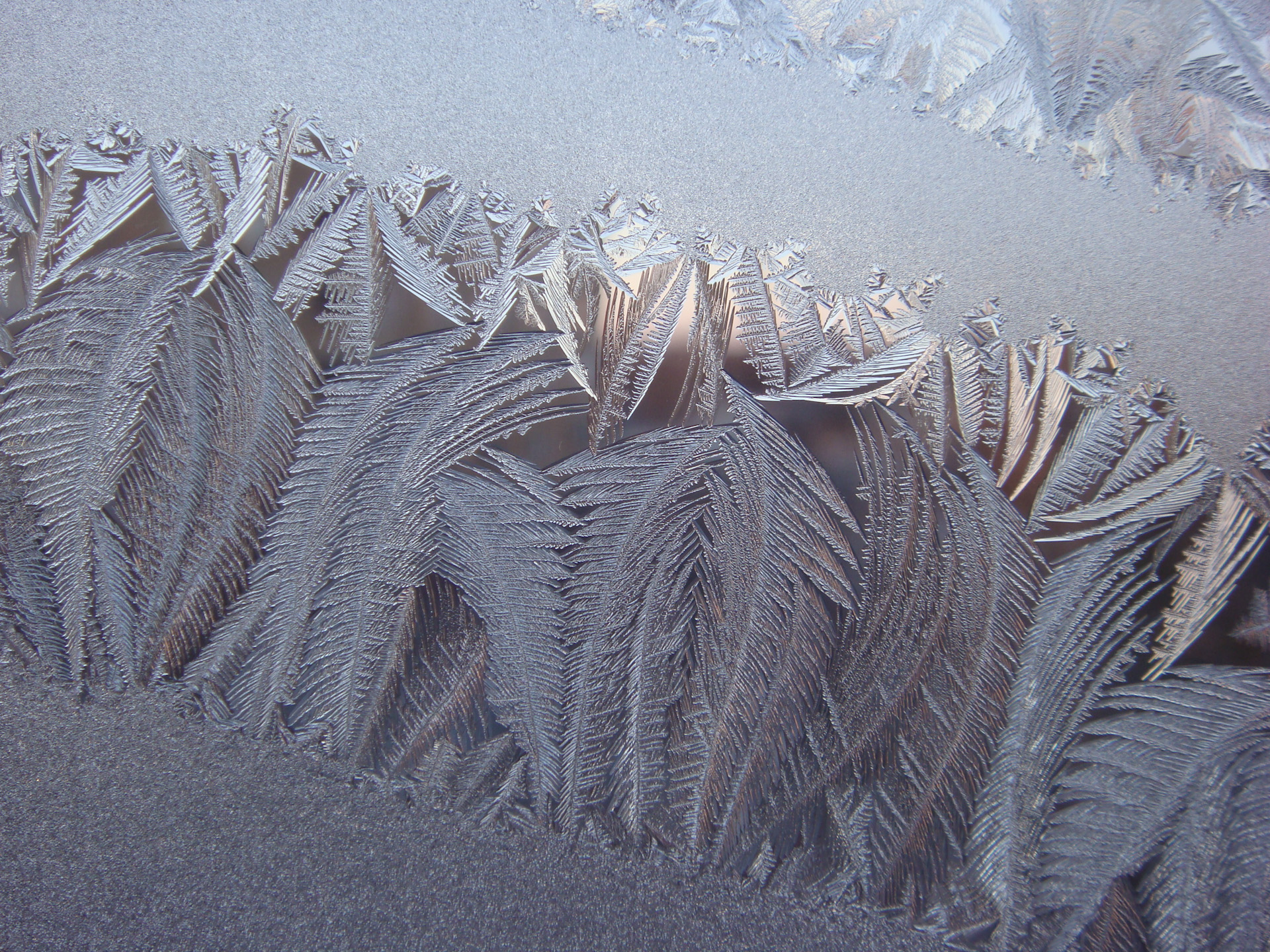
Window frost

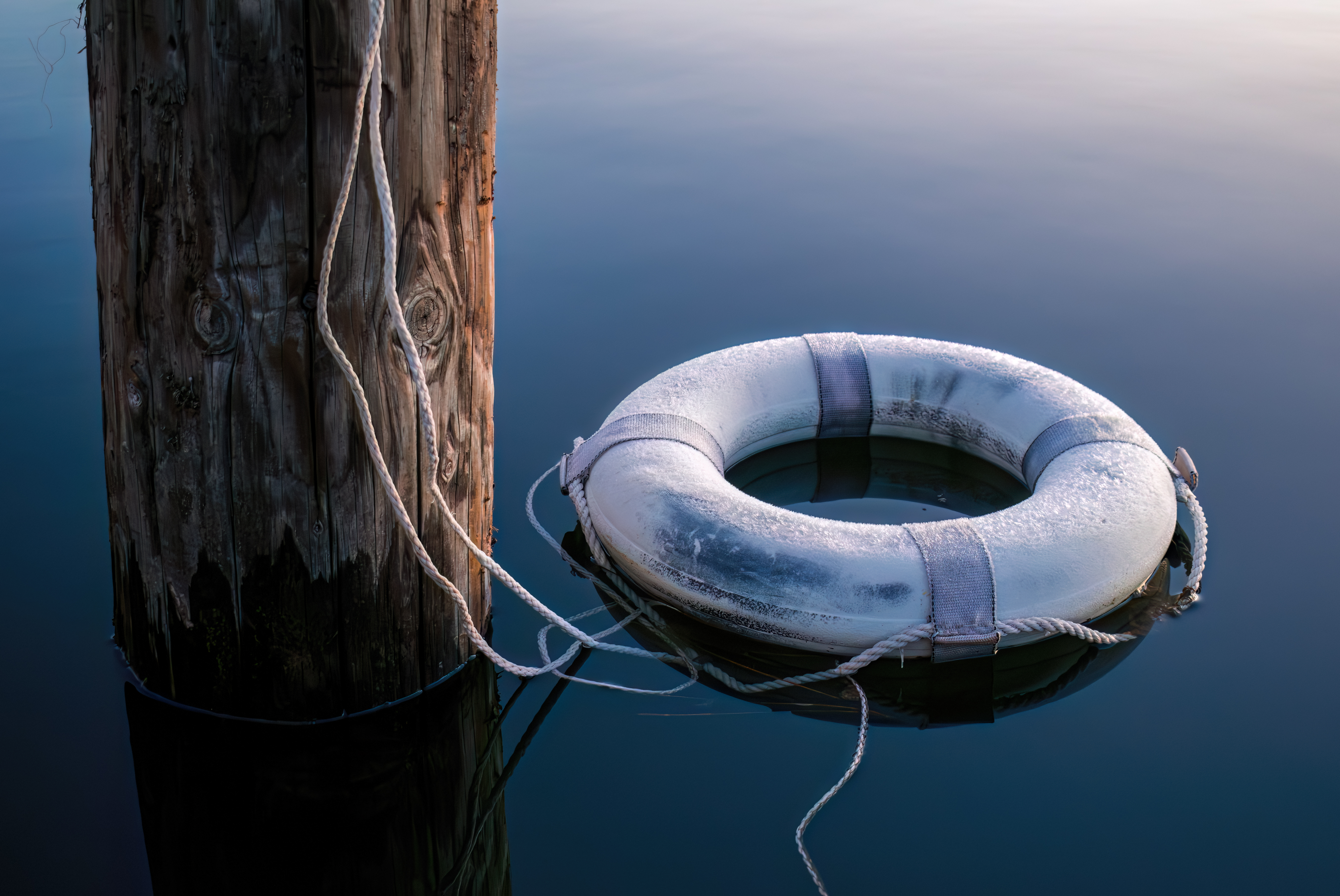
Frost-covered lifebuoy, Lake Siskiyou, California

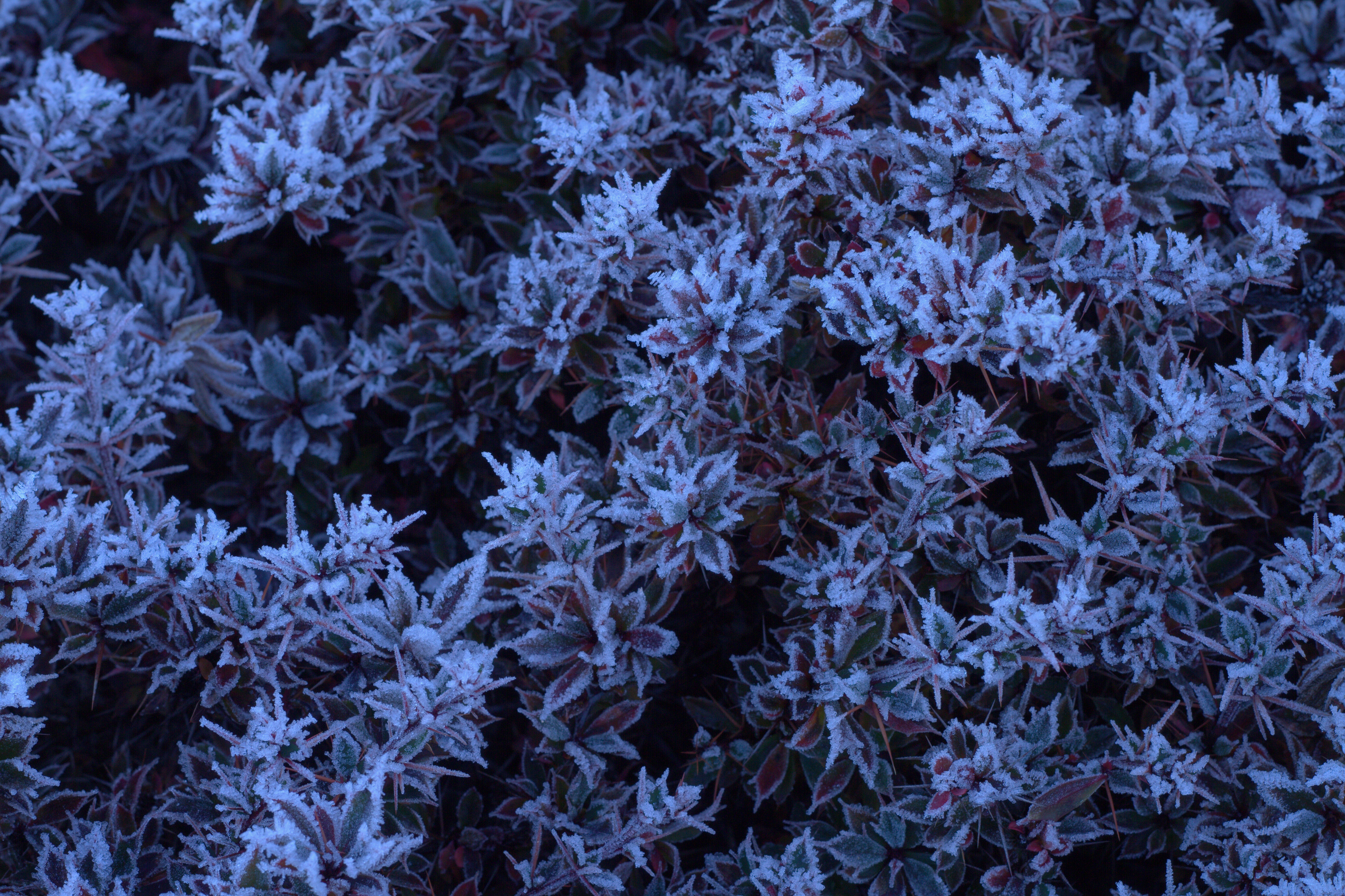
Frost on plant leaves in the Himalayas

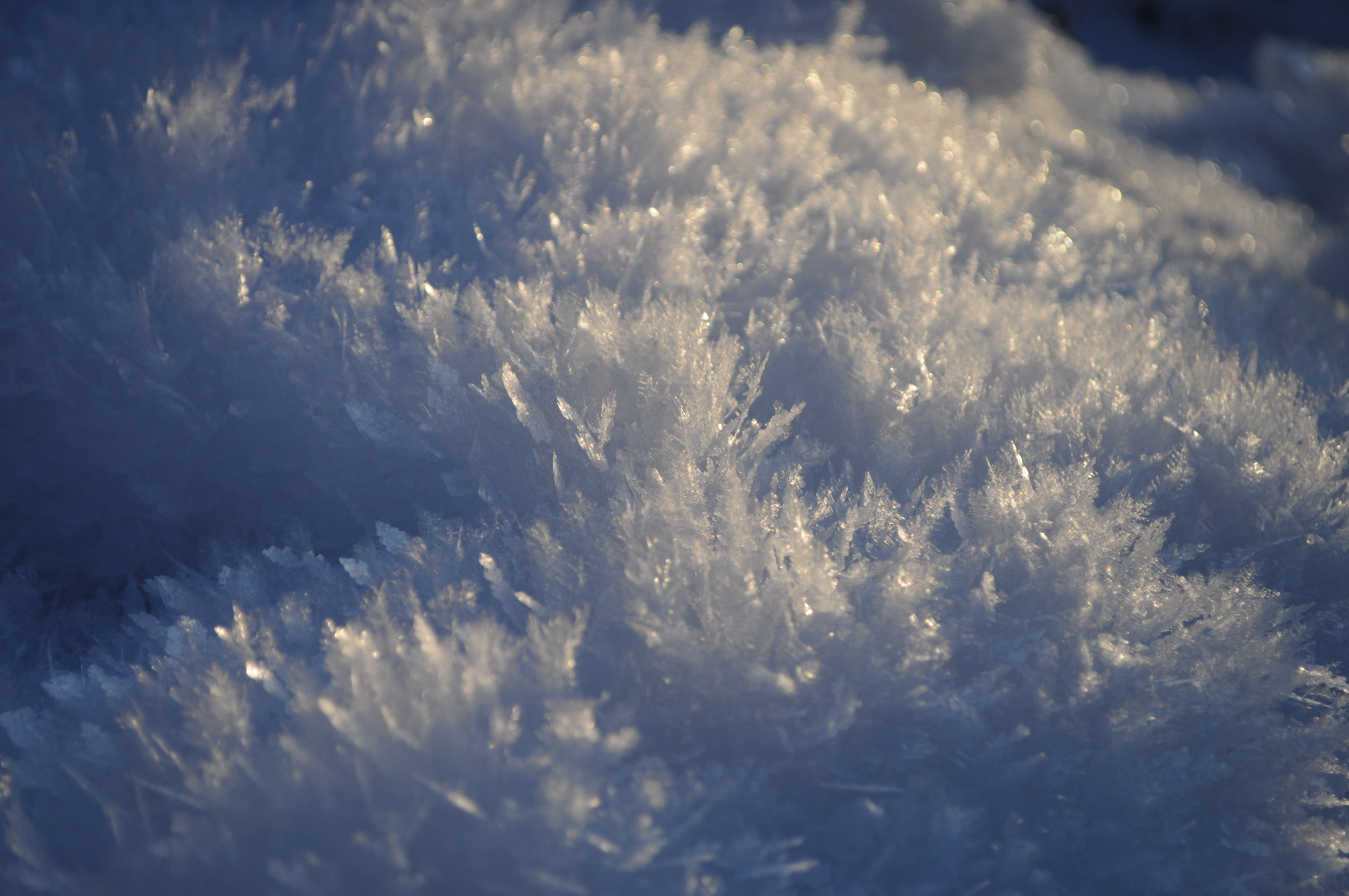
Surface hoar in Alaska

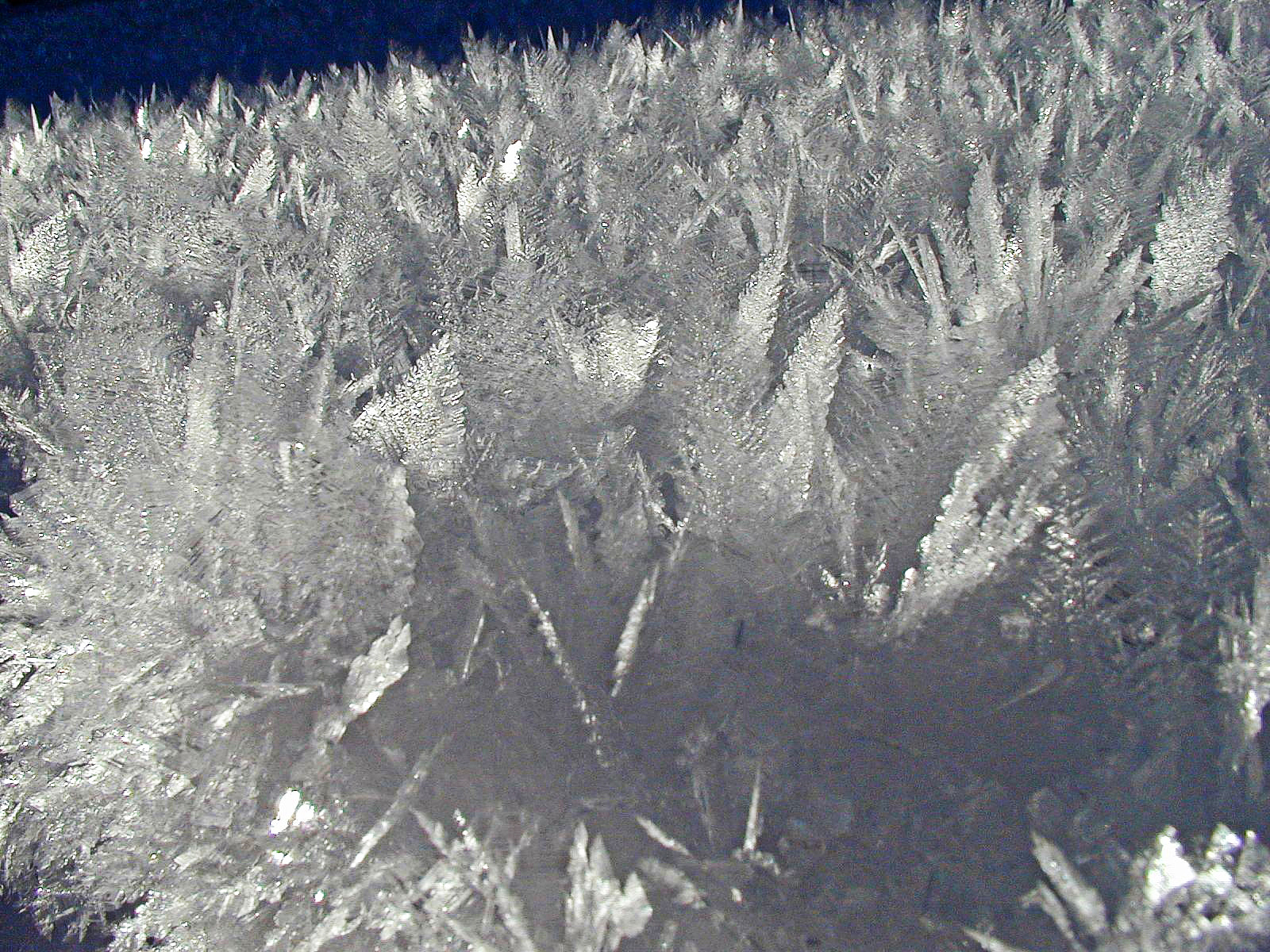
Hoar frost in Julian Alps

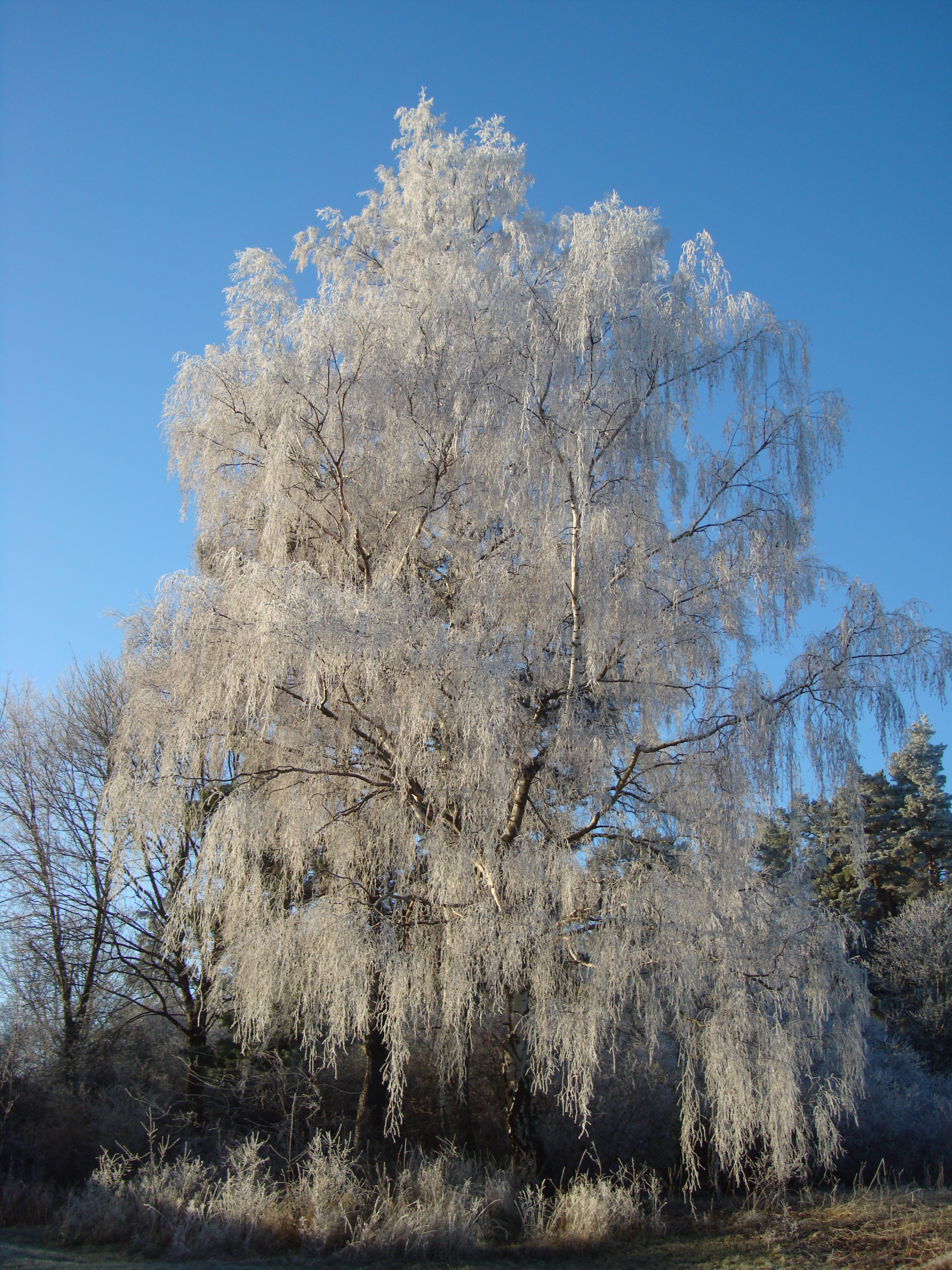
Frost on birch tree in Stockholm

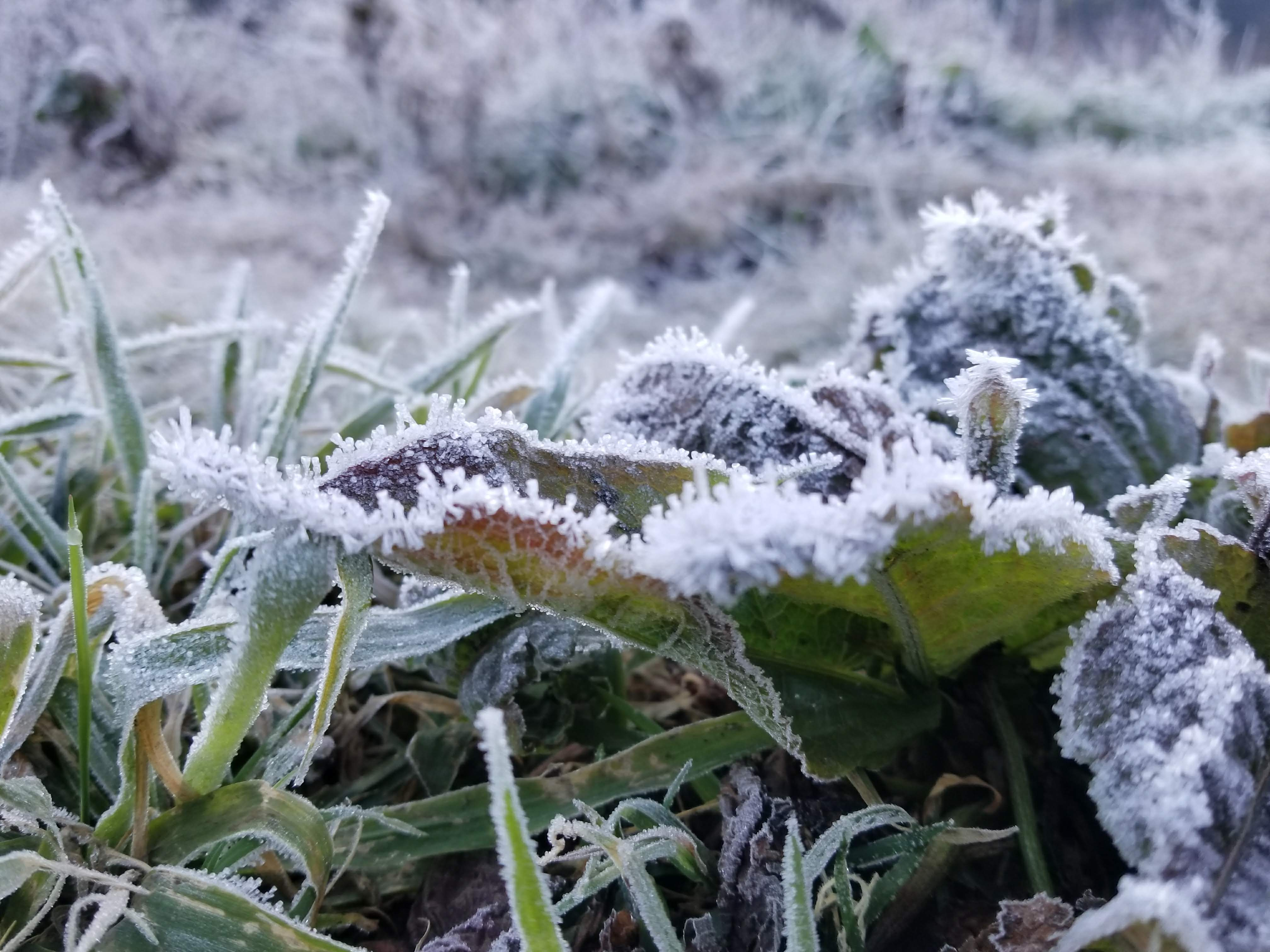
Frost on grass in Ranu Pani, East Java, Indonesia

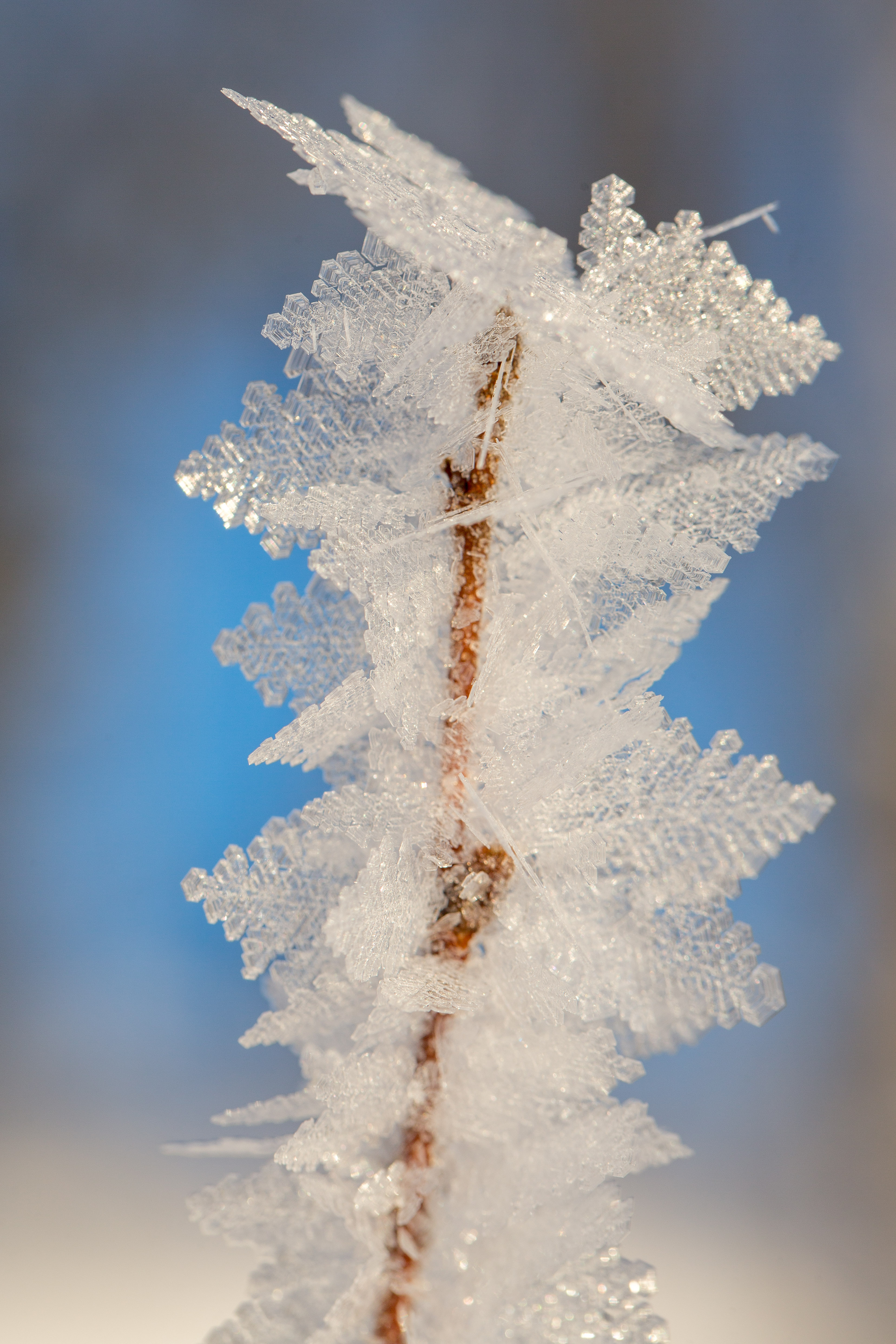
Frost on birch stem in Norway

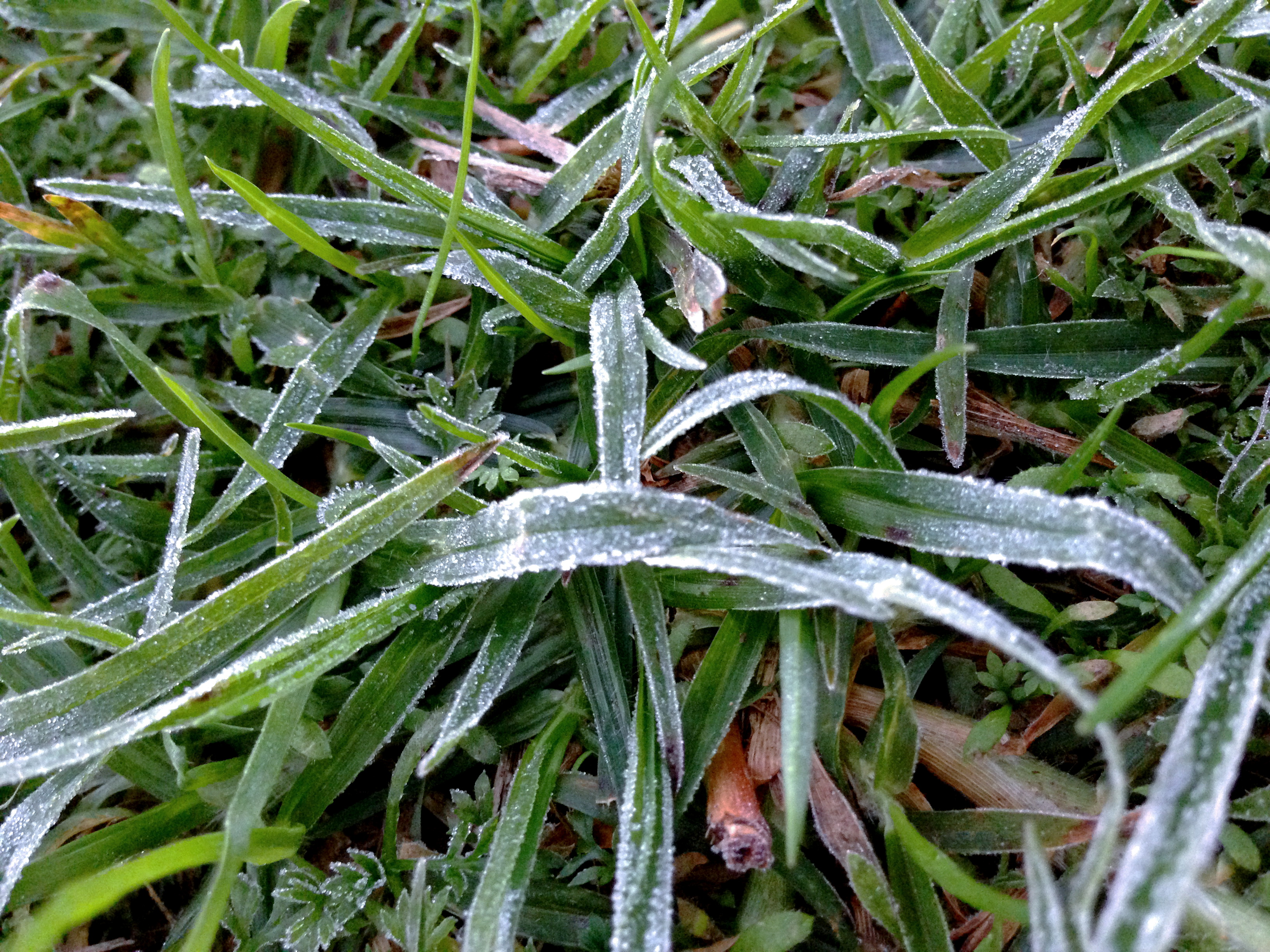
Light frost on grass in Western Sydney, New South Wales, Australia

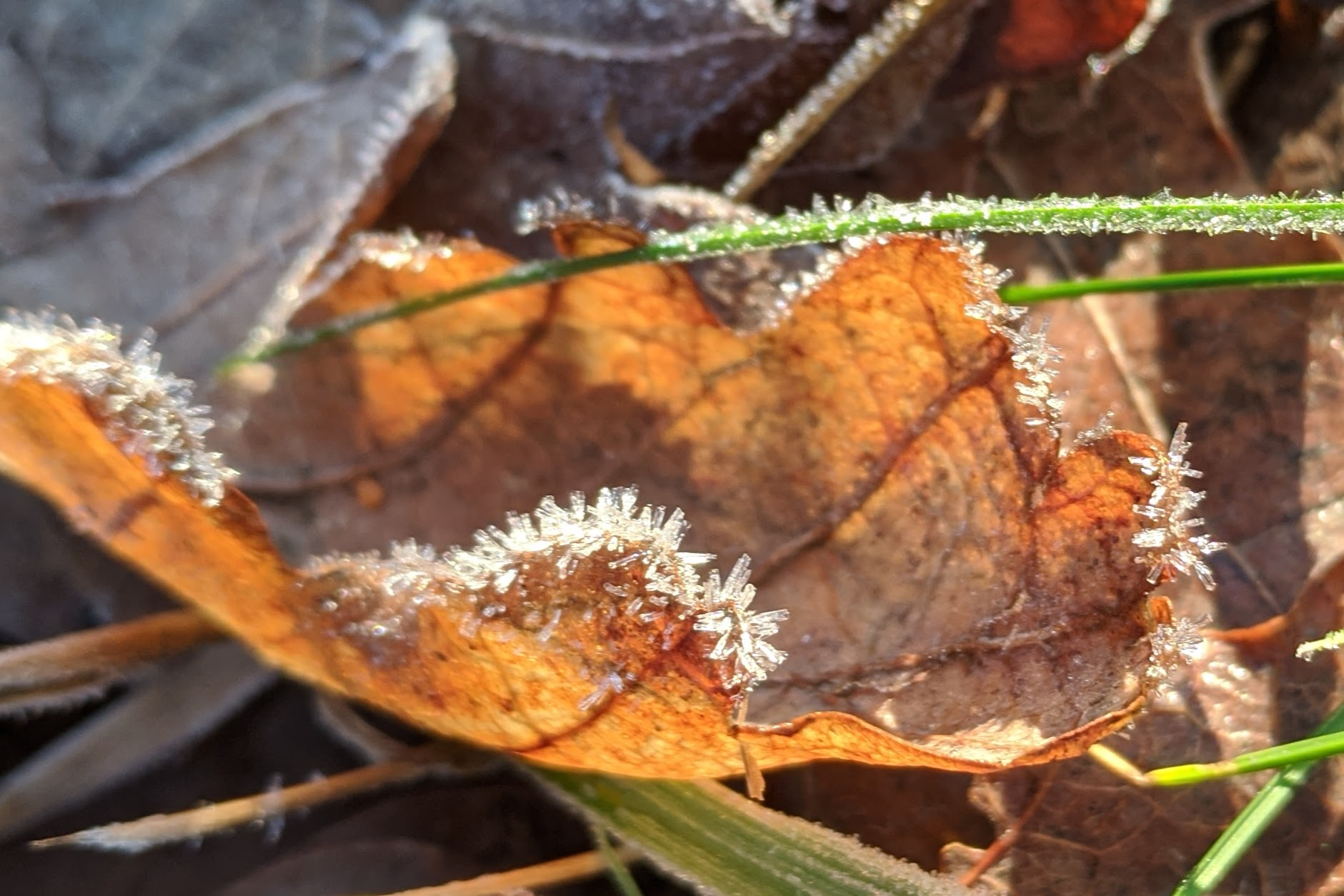
An oak leaf with frost in Sweden

== See also ==
- Black ice
- Frost (temperature)
- Frost heaving
- Frost line
- Frostbite
- Ground frost
- Icing (nautical)
- Needle ice
