= Philippine Center for Postharvest Development and Mechanization =

Philippine government bureau

- Sentro ng Pilipinas sa Makaaning Gawain at Paggamit ng Makinarya

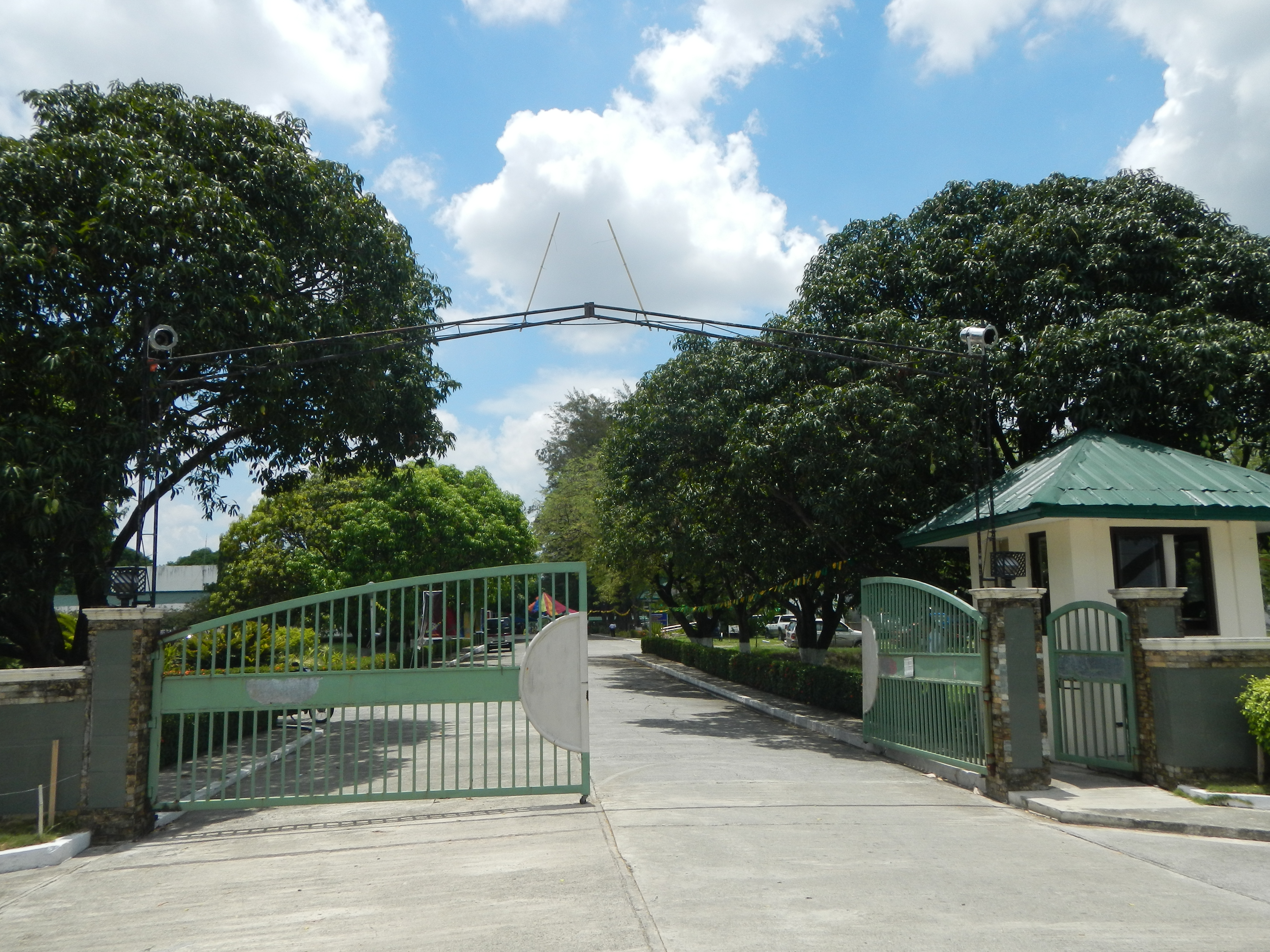

Agency overview
- Formed: May 24, 1978
- Headquarters: CLSU, Muñoz, Nueva Ecija
- Employees: 114 (2024)
- Agency executive: Dionisio G. Alvindia, Director
- Parent agency: Department of Agriculture
- Website: PHilMech

The Philippine Center for Postharvest Development and Mechanization (PHilMech; Filipino: Sentro ng Pilipinas sa Makaaning Gawain at Paggamit ng Makinarya), formerly known as the National Postharvest Institute for Research and Extension (NAPHIRE) and the Bureau of Postharvest Research and Extension, is a bureau of the Department of Agriculture of the Philippines.

It was created on May 24, 1978, through Presidential Decree 1380 to spearhead the development of the country's postharvest industry.

As a subsidiary of the National Grains Authority (NGA) in 1980, BPRE's powers and functions were expanded through LOI 1142 to include other agricultural commodities in line with the conversion of NGA to the National Food Authority (NFA).

In 1986, BPRE became an attached agency of the Department of Agriculture through Executive Order 116.

The agency was regularized and transformed into a bureau through Executive Order 494 in 1992.

With Republic Act No. 8435 or the Agriculture and Fishery Modernization Act (AFMA), BPRE coordinates with the Post-Harvest Horticulture, Training and Research Center of the University of the Philippines Los Baños to determine postharvest technologies that can help the country's fisheries and agricultural industries.

In 2006, it was given its modern name and its scope expanded to include mechanization.
