= Muñoz, Nueva Ecija =

Component city in Nueva Ecija, Philippines

Muñoz
- Component city
- Science City of Muñoz
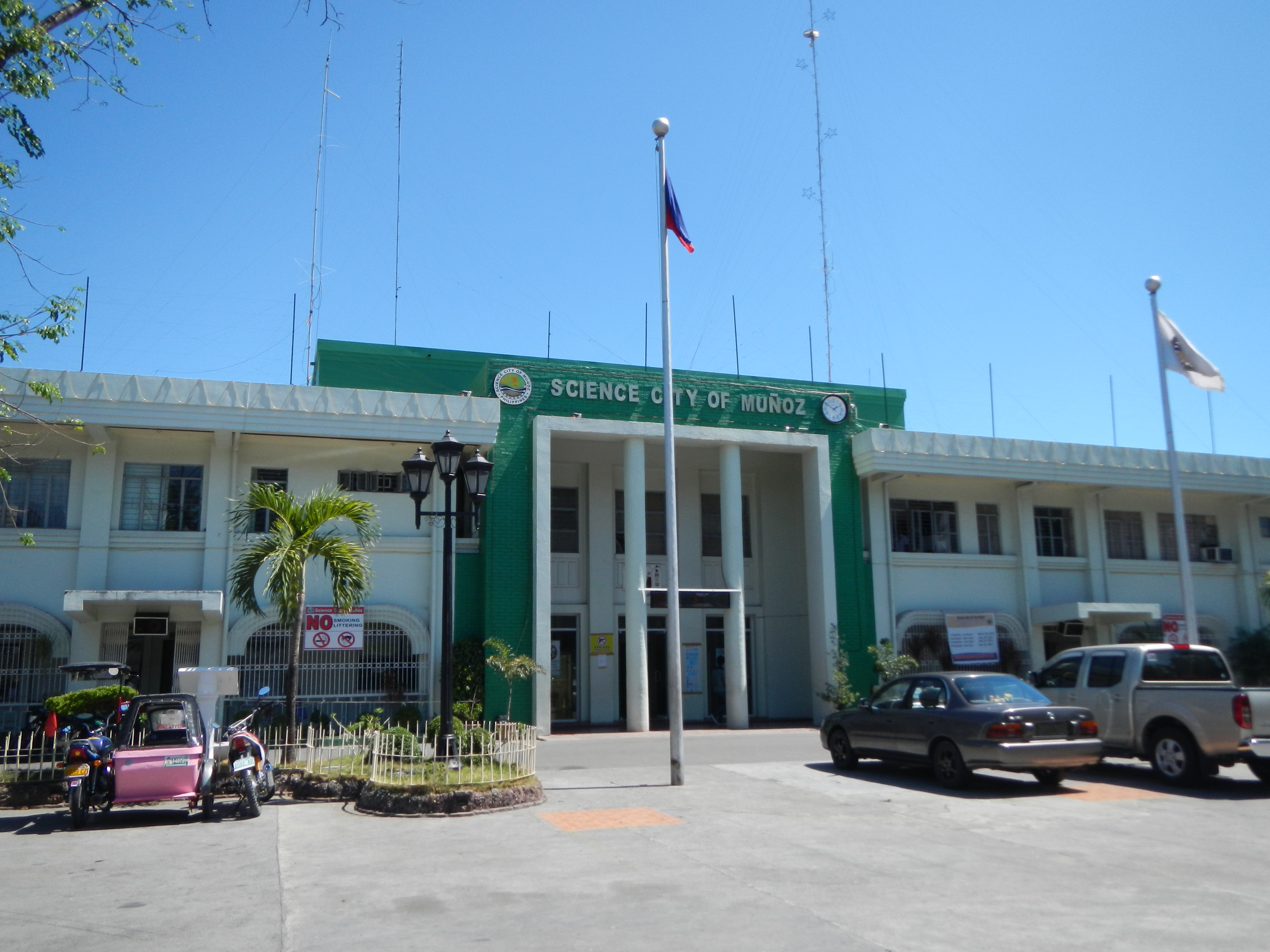
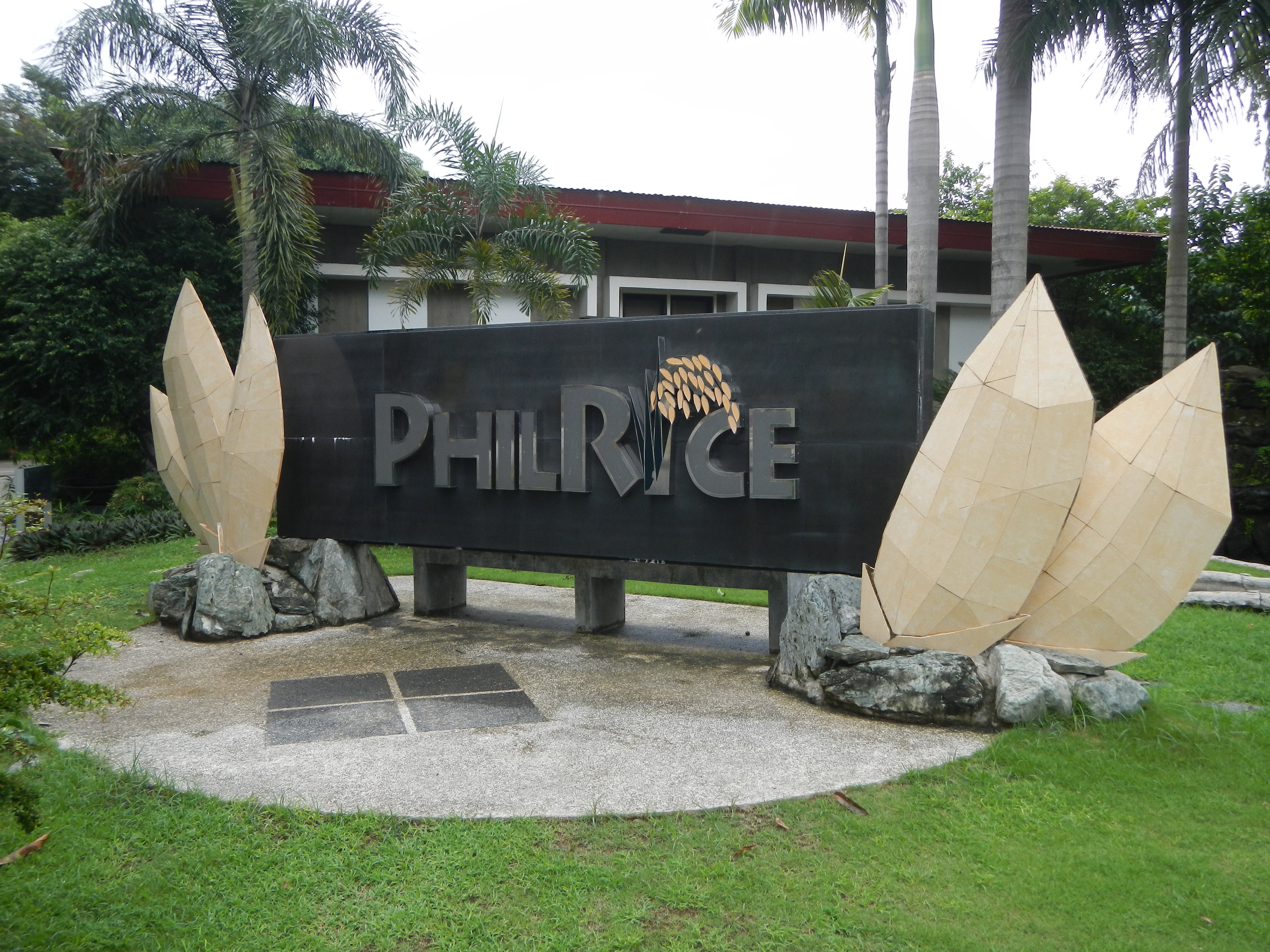
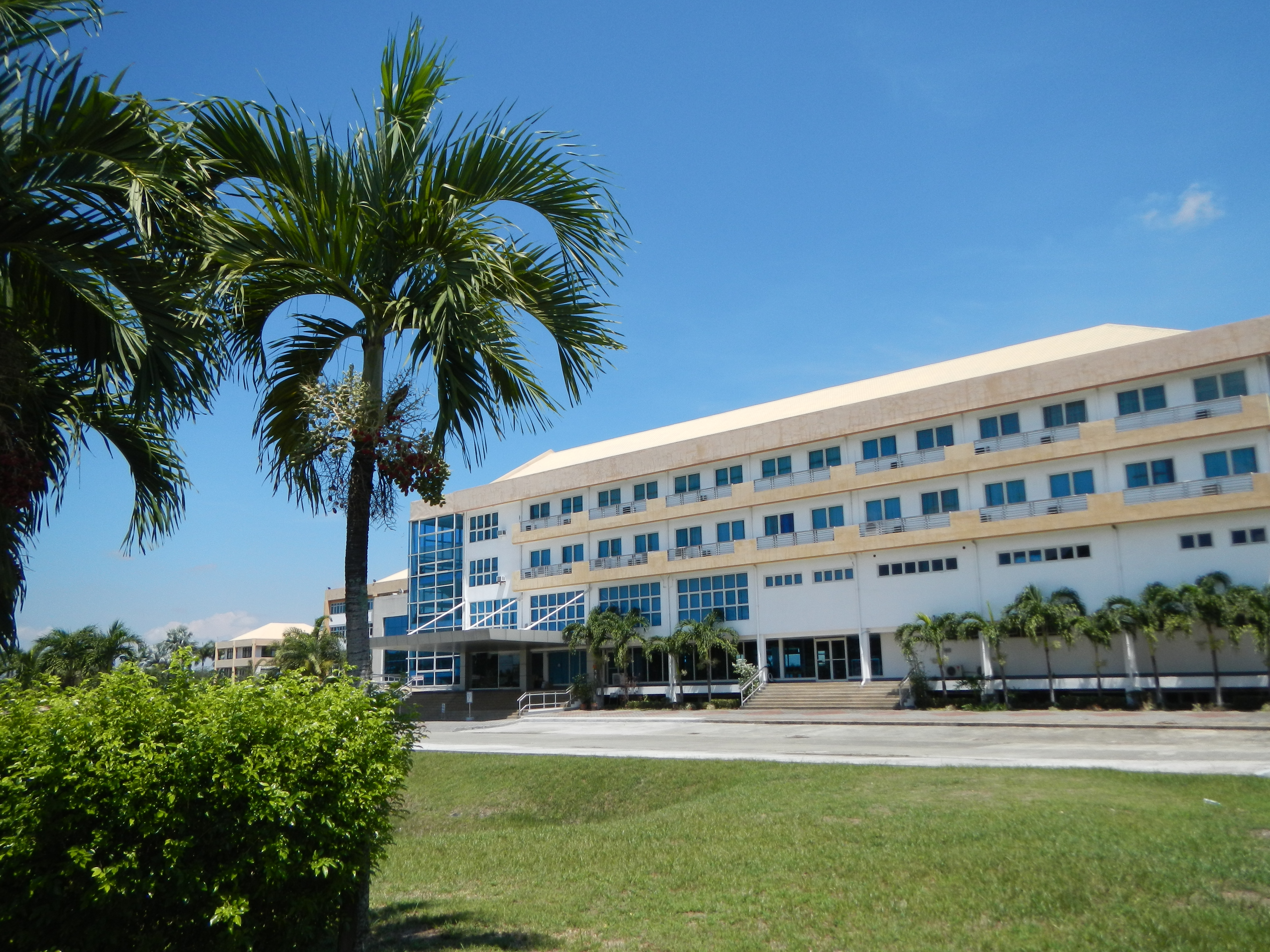
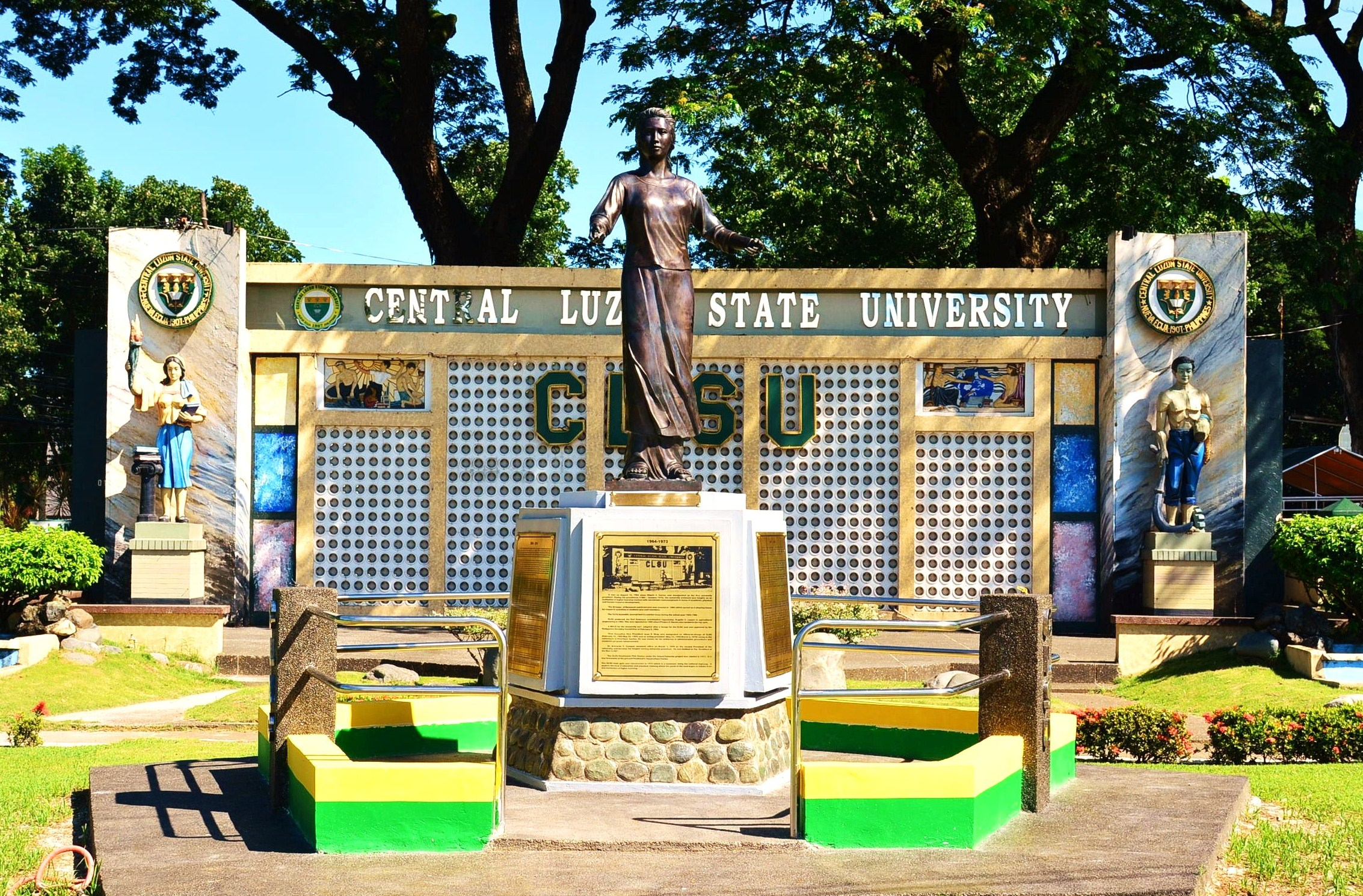
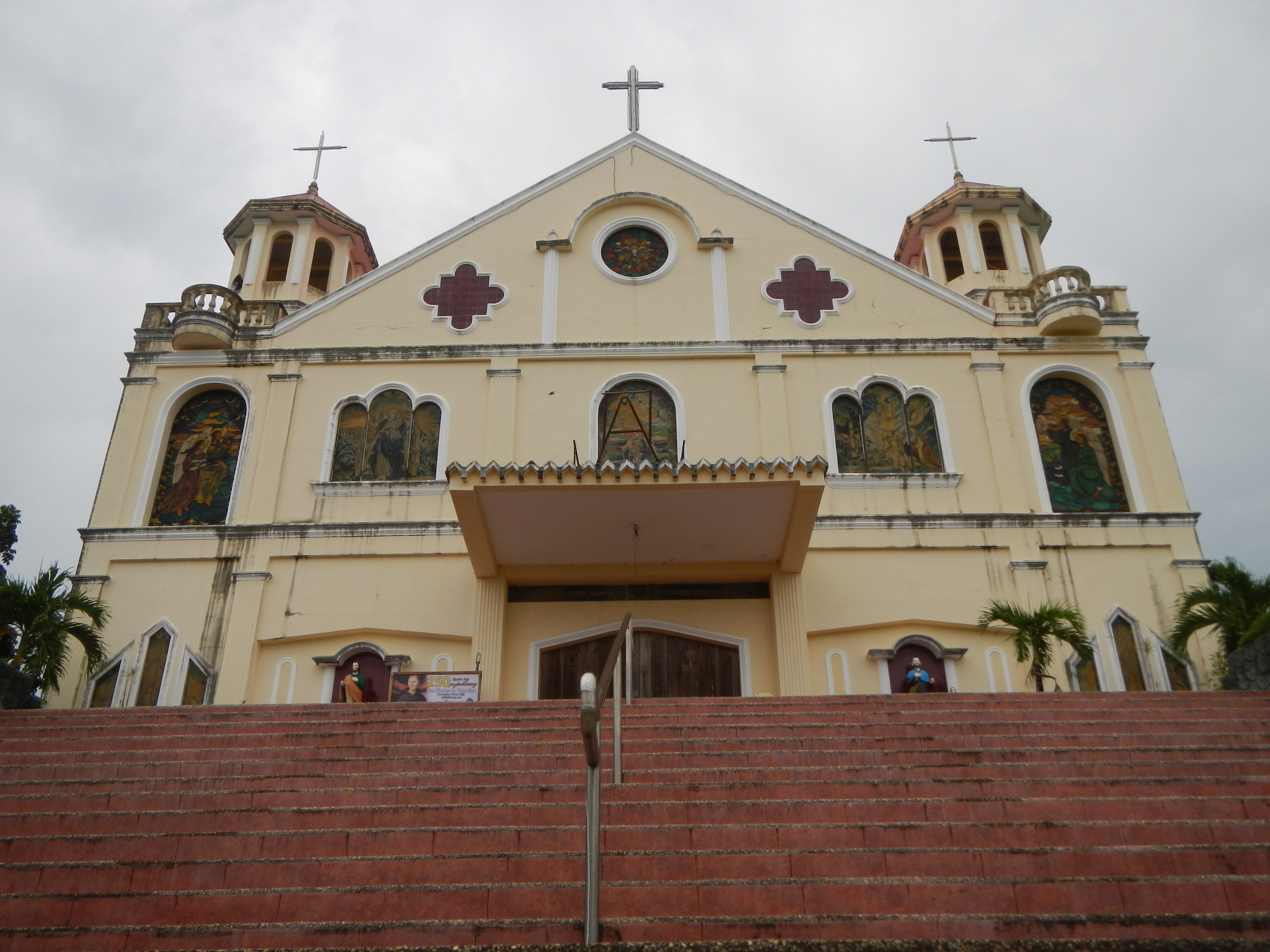
- From top, left to right: Science City of Muñoz Hall, Philippine Rice Research Institute Entrance, Philippine Carabao Center, Sacred Heart of Jesus Parish Shrine, Main Gate of the Central Luzon State University

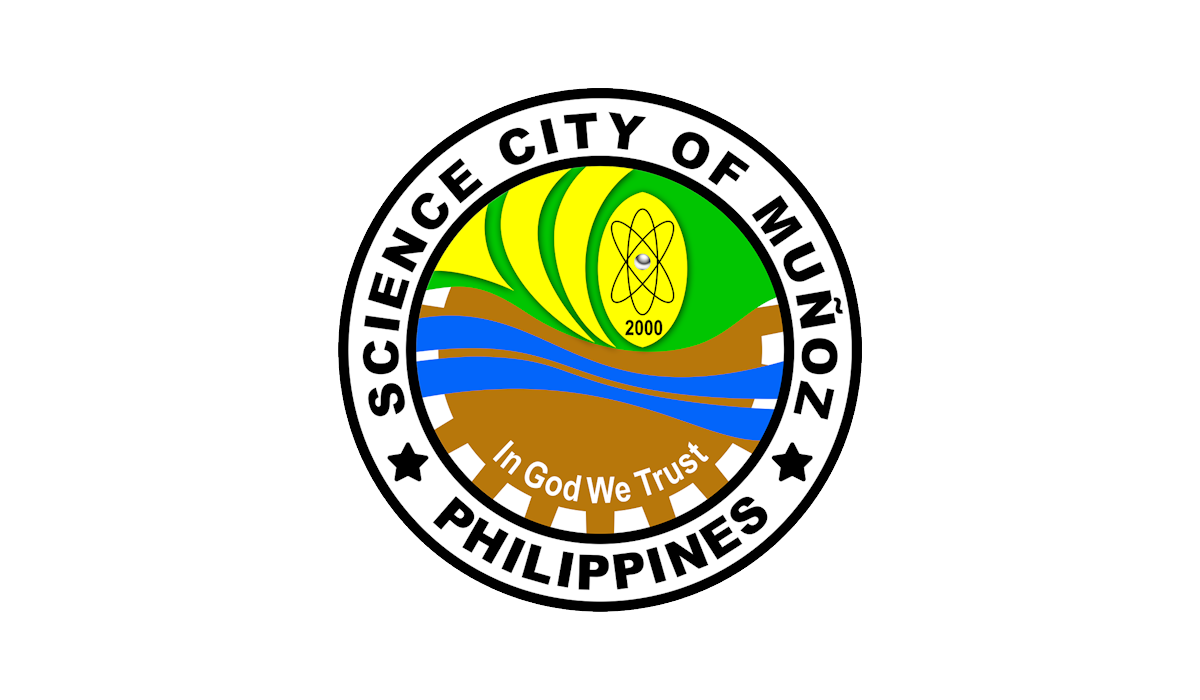
- Flag Seal

- Map of Nueva Ecija with Muñoz highlighted
- Interactive map of Muñoz
- Location within the Philippines
- Coordinates: 15°42′55″N 120°54′14″E
- Country: Philippines
- Region: Central Luzon
- Province: Nueva Ecija
- District: 2nd district
- Founded: 1913
- Cityhood: December 9, 2000
- Named for: Francisco Muñoz
- Barangays: 37 (see Barangays)

Government
  - Type: Sangguniang Panlungsod
  - Mayor: Baby Armi L. Alvarez
  - Vice Mayor: Nestor L. Alvarez
  - Representative: Mario O. Salvador
  - City Council: Members: Marianito C. Pacheco Jr.; Jerry S. Fulgencio; Rommel G. Abon; Henry G. Agaloos; Altreb S. Castañeda; Cesar T. Viloria Jr.; Allan S. Pingol; Carmelita J. Umagat; Vincent DV. Alvarez; Rodney S. Cabrera
  - Electorate: 56,957 voters (2025)

Area
  - Total: 163.05 km^{2} (62.95 sq mi)
- Elevation: 95 m (312 ft)
- Highest elevation: 822 m (2,697 ft)
- Lowest elevation: 22 m (72 ft)

Population (2024 census)
  - Total: 85,061
  - Density: 521.69/km^{2} (1,351.2/sq mi)
  - Households: 20,933

Economy
  - Income class: 4th city income class
  - Poverty incidence: 10.51% (2023)
  - Revenue: ₱ 968.5 million (2024)
  - Assets: ₱ 3,054 million (2024)
  - Expenditure: ₱ 77.56 million (2024)
  - Liabilities: ₱ 632.3 million (2024)

Service provider
  - Electricity: Nueva Ecija 2 Area 1 Electric Cooperative (NEECO 2 A1)
- Time zone: UTC+8 (PST)
- ZIP code: 3119, 3120
- PSGC: 034917000
- IDD : area code: +63 (0)44
- Native languages: Ilocano; Tagalog
- Website: www.sciencecityofmunoz.ph

Muñoz, officially the Science City of Muñoz (Filipino: Lungsod Agham ng Muñoz, Ilocano: Siudad ti Siensia ti Muñoz, Pangasinan: Siyudad ya Siyensiya na Muñoz), is a component city in the province of Nueva Ecija, Philippines. According to the 2024 census, it has a population of 85,061 people.

Originally known as Sitio Papaya, it was renamed Muñoz in 1886 in honor of the Spanish governor Don Francisco Muñoz. In 1913, Executive Order No. 72 declared Muñoz a separate municipality. By virtue of Republic Act No. 8977, signed on November 7, 2000, Muñoz was converted into a component city and became the country's only city with "Science" in its official name.

== Etymology ==
The town got its name in honor of Don Francisco Muñoz, being the alcalde mayor and gobernadorcillo.

Science City of Muñoz, located in Nueva Ecija, Philippines, is known for its agricultural research and scientific institutions. It was officially declared a Science City in 2000 because it houses several major research and educational institutions specializing in agriculture, biotechnology, and aquaculture.

Some key institutions in Muñoz that contribute to its "Science City" status include:

- Philippine Rice Research Institute (PhilRice) – Focuses on rice science and development.
- Central Luzon State University (CLSU) – A top agricultural university.
- Philippine Carabao Center (PCC) – Conducts research on water buffalo genetics and dairy production.
- Bureau of Postharvest Research and Extension (BPRE) – Works on improving postharvest technologies.
- National Renewable Energy Laboratory (NREL) – Researches alternative energy sources.

== History ==
=== Early history ===
The present-day city was formerly a barrio known as Papaya. In 1886, the name was changed to Muñoz in honor of Don Francisco Muñoz, the first appointed gobernadorcillo.

The barrio was once a forested area. During the American occupation, in 1907, part of it was selected for the establishment of a government agricultural school—the present-day Central Luzon State University (CLSU).

Residents of barrios Muñoz and San Anton in San Juan de Guimba, and of Palusapis in Santo Domingo, later petitioned for them, along with the sitios in Talavera—Kabisukulan, Rangayan, Rizal, Mataas-na-lupa, Siniguelas, Pukoc, Agricultura, and Pulong-maragol—to be organized into a separate municipality. On October 18, 1912, Newton W. Gilbert, the island's acting Governor General, issued Executive Order No. 72 which created Muñoz as the twenty-fourth municipality of Nueva Ecija, with Barrio Muñoz designated as the seat of government; the order took effect on January 1, 1913. As mandated, a municipal hall and a school building was constructed.

In the aftermath of a typhoon that hit Luzon on October 9–11, 1936, and caused floods, affecting the central and southwestern part with the province the hardest hit, 20 bodies were found at the agricultural school.

=== Japanese period ===
In January 1945, the United States Army landed at Lingayen Gulf. This was opposed by the Imperial Japanese Army's 14th Army under the command of Gen. Tomoyuki Yamashita; its 2nd Tank Division, which had been in Luzon since July 1944, was involved in tank battles in Pangasinan and Nueva Ecija, particularly Muñoz and Lupao.

Gen. William Krueger, realizing the strategic importance of capturing San Jose (situated in the municipality's northeast), ordered units under the I Corps of the United States Army to liberate the area. The Japanese defense had eight strong points around the area, including that at Muñoz, which was ordered attacked by Gen. Innis Swift, commander of the I Corps, to the 6th Division. Filipinos also engaged the Japanese in a close-quarter battle—the battle of Muñoz—including Col. Cesar Pobre, a member of the United States 98 Mortar Brigade.

=== Post-colonial period ===
Muñoz had its territory reduced on January 1, 1948, when barrios Alula, Calisitan, and Saverona were separated and, along with portions of Cuyapo, Guimba, and Lupao, were organized into the province's twenty-eighth municipality—Talugtug—by virtue of Executive Order No. 113.

In late September of that year, a ten-hour battle, one of the bloodiest between the Philippine Constabulary (PC) and the Hukbalahap, occurred near the municipality where 83 people were killed.

During the Marcos administration post-martial law, Jun Quimpo, an activist who had been working for an underground movement in the rural areas, was fatally shot by his former comrade who had surrendered to the PC, in Calisitan in December 1981.

The municipality was affected by the 1990 Luzon earthquake; with 75 people died in the collapse of the library of the CLSU.

In September 1993, through the initiatives of the leadership of the municipality and the CLSU, the agricultural town became the fifth in the country to be classified by the Department of Science and Technology (DOST) as a science community. This is due to the presence of various centers of excellence and research and development agencies; at the time of the cityhood, there were sixteen, most notably the CLSU, Philippine Rice Research Institute, Philippine Carabao Center, as well as the provincial offices of the DOST and the Agricultural Training Institute.

=== Cityhood ===
Mayor Efren Alvarez (who would be the first city mayor; served 1992–2001) later sought the conversion of the municipality into what would be the country's first "Science City." A master plan was then developed for the development into such agricultural entity. The Nueva Ecija Provincial Board endorsed the cityhood through a resolution. However, the province's second district representative Eleuterio Violago said that the requirements for cityhood were yet to be complied.

Nevertheless, in 1998, the cityhood bill was sponsored in the House of Representatives by Simeon Garcia (Violago's successor), being supported by provincial governor Tomas Joson III; and was co-introduced by Josefina Joson, also from the province. It was later sponsored in the Senate by senators Sergio Osmeña III and Vicente Sotto III. According to senator Aquilino Pimentel Jr., the chamber's local government chairperson, the bid was different as it was about the creation of a city of such kind, being passed by the House prior to adoption by the Senate of a ruling that was supposed to make the plan be rejected.

On November 7, 2000, President Joseph Estrada signed Republic Act No. 8977, converting the town into a science city, which is also the world's second after Tsukuba, Japan. On December 9, the conversion was ratified in a plebiscite with about 12,468 voters favoring the bid, against 602 who voted against; hence becoming the province's fourth component city, officially bearing the name Science City of Muñoz—the only local government unit in the country holding such designation to date.

=== Contemporary ===
Muñoz is among those areas in the province's northwest whose rice fields are being reached by the Casecnan Multi-Purpose Irrigation and Power Project of the National Irrigation Administration; the project became operational in 2001.

At the early morning of September 26, 2012, a traffic collision occurred on Maharlika Highway in Barangay Bantug, killing the drivers of a Victory Liner bus and a fuel tanker, five bus passengers, and a couple on a motorcycle.

In November 2012, mayor Alvarez and vice mayor Ester Lazaro had a dispute over the mayorship as the latter was designated as acting mayor. In February 2013, the Supreme Court unseated Alvarez after affirming his 2009 conviction by the Sandiganbayan for graft.

On August 22, 2023, Muñoz and Batac signed a sisterhood agreement.

== Geography ==
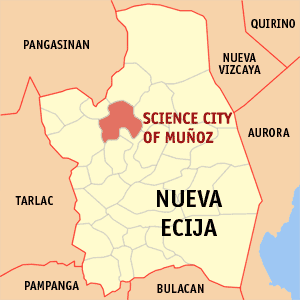
Previous Muñoz map in December 20, 2008

Muñoz is situated 30 kilometres (19 mi) from Cabanatuan, 44 kilometres (27 mi) from Palayan, and 146 kilometres (91 mi) north of the capital Manila. Due to its rich topography and tropical climate, it is now home to agricultural research and technology centers, committed to the production of information and technological breakthroughs to promote rural development, productivity, and food security.

=== Barangays ===
Science City of Muñoz is politically subdivided into 37 barangays. Each barangay consists of puroks and some have sitios.

PSGC	Barangay	Population			±% p.a.	
		2024		2010		
03-49-17-001	Bagong Sikat	2.4%	2,031	2,033	▾	−0.01%
03-49-17-002	Balante	2.2%	1,865	2,039	▾	−0.62%
03-49-17-003	Bantug	13.1%	11,104	10,345	▴	0.49%
03-49-17-004	Bical	3.4%	2,868	2,793	▴	0.18%
03-49-17-005	Cabisuculan	1.5%	1,259	1,264	▾	−0.03%
03-49-17-006	Calabalabaan	1.4%	1,170	1,080	▴	0.56%
03-49-17-007	Calisitan	1.2%	1,009	968	▴	0.29%
03-49-17-008	Catalanacan	4.4%	3,783	3,200	▴	1.17%
03-49-17-009	Curva	1.5%	1,305	1,201	▴	0.58%
03-49-17-010	Franza	3.3%	2,822	2,650	▴	0.44%
03-49-17-011	Gabaldon	2.7%	2,309	2,118	▴	0.60%
03-49-17-012	Labney	1.3%	1,064	940	▴	0.86%
03-49-17-013	Licaong	1.8%	1,521	1,613	▾	−0.41%
03-49-17-014	Linglingay	3.7%	3,151	2,985	▴	0.38%
03-49-17-015	Mangandingay	2.1%	1,819	1,688	▴	0.52%
03-49-17-016	Magtanggol	2.9%	2,452	2,205	▴	0.74%
03-49-17-017	Maligaya	5.5%	4,656	4,643	▴	0.02%
03-49-17-018	Mapangpang	0.7%	627	575	▴	0.60%
03-49-17-019	Maragol	2.9%	2,458	2,935	▾	−1.23%
03-49-17-020	Matingkis	1.3%	1,093	972	▴	0.82%
03-49-17-021	Naglabrahan	0.7%	584	586	▾	−0.02%
03-49-17-022	Palusapis	3.5%	2,987	2,777	▴	0.51%
03-49-17-023	Pandalla	1.2%	990	963	▴	0.19%
03-49-17-024	Poblacion East	2.4%	2,006	2,080	▾	−0.25%
03-49-17-025	Poblacion North	3.2%	2,707	2,758	▾	−0.13%
03-49-17-026	Poblacion South	2.1%	1,790	2,350	▾	−1.87%
03-49-17-027	Poblacion West	3.8%	3,247	4,085	▾	−1.58%
03-49-17-028	Rang-ayan	2.7%	2,311	2,139	▴	0.54%
03-49-17-029	Rizal	2.1%	1,751	1,640	▴	0.46%
03-49-17-030	San Andres	2.1%	1,798	1,667	▴	0.53%
03-49-17-031	San Antonio	2.7%	2,305	2,166	▴	0.43%
03-49-17-032	San Felipe	2.4%	2,020	1,973	▴	0.16%
03-49-17-033	Sapang Cawayan	1.8%	1,570	1,483	▴	0.40%
03-49-17-034	Villa Isla	3.2%	2,686	2,811	▾	−0.32%
03-49-17-035	Villa Nati	2.8%	2,377	1,301	▴	4.28%
03-49-17-036	Villa Santos	1.2%	986	959	▴	0.19%
03-49-17-037	Villa Cuizon	2.1%	1,827	1,498	▴	1.39%
	Total		85,061	81,483	▴	0.30%

=== Dispute ===
The National Government has an ongoing move to transfer the Talavera barangays of Matingkis (Talavera), Bakal 1, Bakal 2 and Bakal 3 to become part of Science City of Munoz for the reason that the said barangays are geographically and strategically within the said city. This was favored by most of the residents of the said barangays but opposed by the Municipal Government of Talavera.

Also there is a proposed separation of Villa Pinili (Bantug West) and San Juan (CLSU) which will include PNR (CLSU), and Sawmill (CLSU) from Barangay Bantug into two independent separate barangays.

=== Climate ===
Climate data for Science City of Muñoz, Nueva Ecija
Month	Jan	Feb	Mar	Apr	May	Jun	Jul	Aug	Sep	Oct	Nov	Dec	Year
Mean daily maximum °C (°F)	29 (84)	30 (86)	31 (88)	33 (91)	33 (91)	31 (88)	30 (86)	29 (84)	29 (84)	30 (86)	30 (86)	29 (84)	30 (87)
Mean daily minimum °C (°F)	19 (66)	19 (66)	20 (68)	22 (72)	23 (73)	24 (75)	24 (75)	24 (75)	23 (73)	22 (72)	21 (70)	20 (68)	22 (71)
Average precipitation mm (inches)	4 (0.2)	6 (0.2)	7 (0.3)	12 (0.5)	61 (2.4)	89 (3.5)	96 (3.8)	99 (3.9)	81 (3.2)	88 (3.5)	37 (1.5)	13 (0.5)	593 (23.5)
Average rainy days	2.5	3.0	4.1	6.3	15.8	19.4	22.5	21.6	20.1	17.5	9.6	4.0	146.4
Source: Meteoblue

== Demographics ==
Population census of Muñoz
Year	Pop.	±% p.a.
1918	11,333	—
1939	21,814	+3.17%
1948	21,748	−0.03%
1960	27,622	+2.01%
1970	35,723	+2.60%
1975	38,619	+1.58%
1980	43,211	+2.27%
1990	50,356	+1.54%
1995	60,162	+3.39%
2000	65,586	+1.87%
2007	71,669	+1.23%
2010	75,462	+1.89%
2015	81,483	+1.47%
2020	84,308	+0.72%
2024	85,061	+0.21%
Source: Philippine Statistics Authority

=== Language ===
Tagalog and Ilocano are the main dialects spoken in Muñoz.

=== Religion ===
Churches:

- The Church of Jesus Christ and Latter Day Saints
- Sacred Heart of Jesus Shrine
- San Sebastian parish Church
- Christ the Worker Parish Church
- Iglesia ni Cristo
- Christian Churches
- IIJMS Temples
- United Pentecostal Church
- The Apostolic Faith Church (Mission of Portland Oregon Inc.)
- Jesus Christ the Living God Fellowship (Conservative Baptist)
- Munoz Christian Church (FIFCOP)
- Lakas Angkan Ministry
- Muñoz Church of Christ

== Economy ==
Poverty incidence of Muñoz (%)

Source: Philippine Statistics Authority

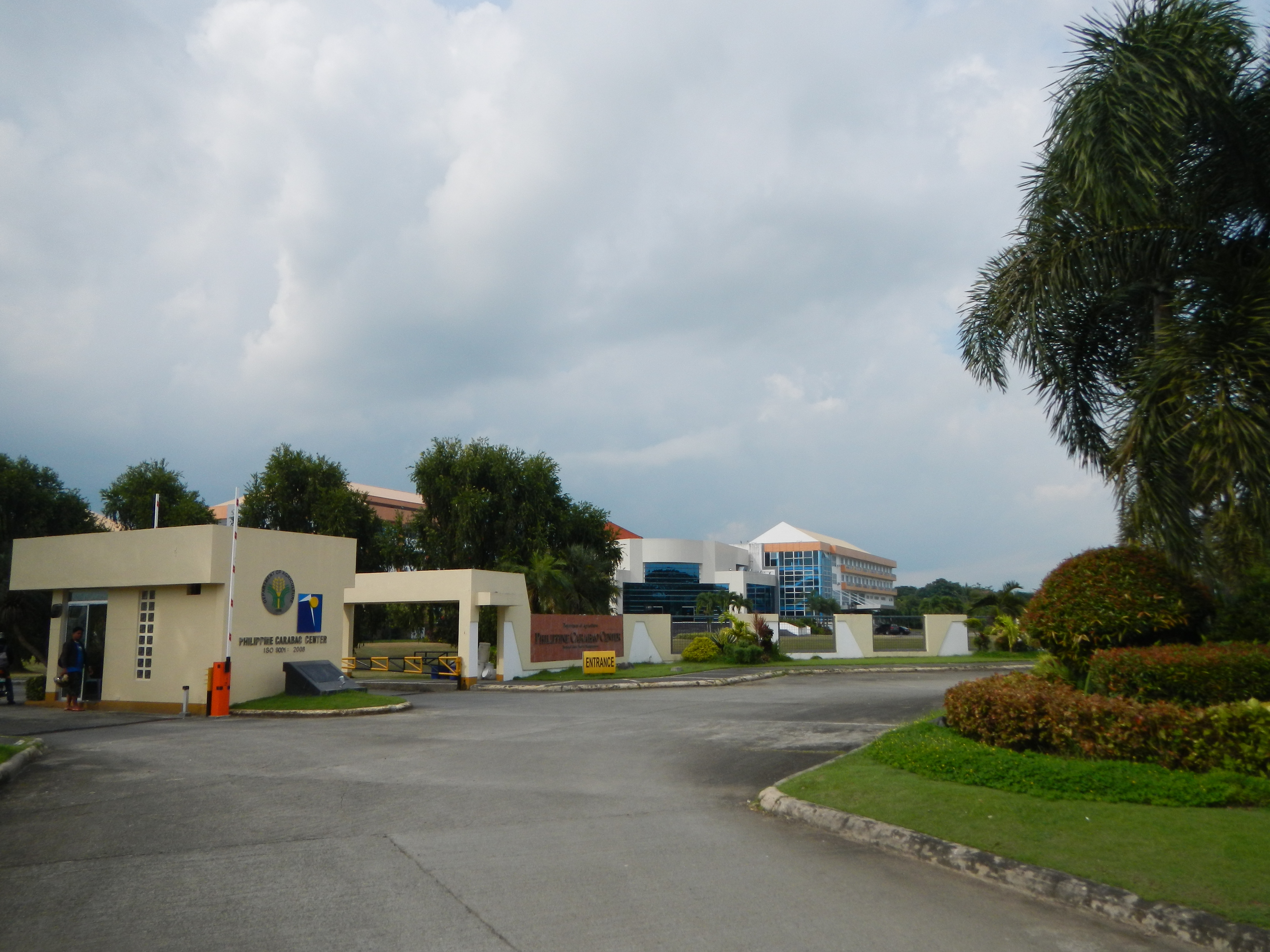
Philippine Carabao Center facade, National Headquarters and Gene Pool

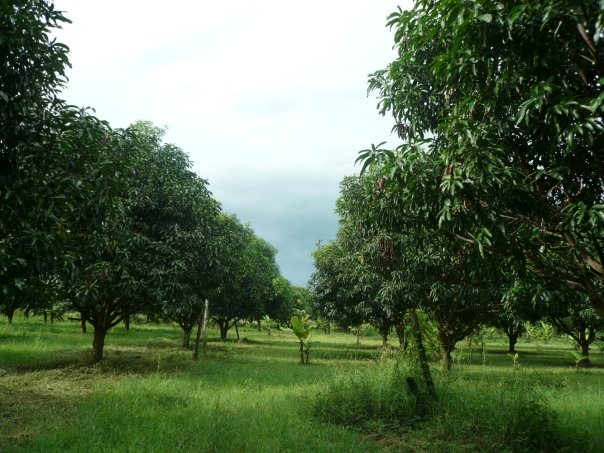
Mango grove in Muñoz

There are many new establishments in Munoz in the past few years. Notable are Jollibee Munoz, Mang Inasal Munoz, 7/11, BDO, Land Bank, Novo, Lucky 99, Friendship Supermarket, Inc (FSi), and the Villa-Mendoza Training Institute, are now major landmarks on the city.

In terms of commercial and shopping sector, Robinsons, Savemore and Puregold has also initially identified locations in the city for future construction. Fast-food chain operator Jollibee already established their store in the city.

With a bustling market center with rice trading as a major economic activity, it has transformed into its present status as a Science City by virtue of Republic Act 8977 on December 9, 2000. Being a science city, Muñoz was acknowledged as one of the members of League of Cities of the Philippines and became a pilot city of achieving the United Nations' Millennium Development Goals.

Research and development centers

- The Philippine Rice Research Institute (PhilRice) (formerly the Maligaya Rice Research and Training Center (MRRTC)) is found in Muñoz
- Central Office and National Genepool of the Philippine Carabao Center (PCC).
- National Freshwater and Fisheries Training and Research Center (NFFTRC)
- The main offices of the Bureau of Postharvest Research and Extension (BPRE) now known as Philippine Center for Postharvest Development and Mechanization (PhilMech)
- Bureau of Fisheries and Aquatic Resources (BFAR-NFFTC) are also based in Muñoz.

== Government ==
=== Elected officials ===
Members of the Muñoz City Council (2022–2025)
Position	Name
District Representative (2nd Legislative District of the Province of Nueva Ecija)	Mario O. Salvador
Chief Executive of the City Muñoz	Mayor Baby Armi L. Alvarez
Presiding Officer of the City Council of Muñoz	Vice Mayor Nestor L. Alvarez
Members of the City Council	Marianito C. Pacheco Jr.
Members of the City Council	Jerry S. Fulgencio
Members of the City Council	Rommel G. Abon
Members of the City Council	Henry G. Agaloos
Members of the City Council	Altreb S. Castañeda
Members of the City Council	Cesar T. Viloria Jr.
Members of the City Council	Allan S. Pingol
Members of the City Council	Carmelita J. Umagat
Members of the City Council	Vincent DV. Alvarez
Members of the City Council	Rodney S. Cabrera

== Transportation ==
As with most towns in Central Luzon, inter-city transport is through the Pan-Philippine Highway (also known as Maharlika Highway/ Asian Highway 26), the country's principal transport backbone.

== Land use ==
Land use	Hectares
Agricultural	9,819
Residential	2,847
Commercial and industrial	784
Institutional	740
Forest hills and pasture	1,215
Roads	246
Water bodies	516
Open spaces	138
Total	16,305

== Education ==
- Central Luzon State University - a state university located on a 658-hectare campus. It serves as the lead agency of the Muñoz Science Community and hosts the Regional Research and Development Center in Central Luzon. CLSU is recognized for its significant contributions to agricultural research in Southeast Asia, particularly in areas such as aquatic culture (notably in the sex reversal of tilapia), ruminant studies, crop science, orchard management, and water management.

== Notable personalities ==
- Alexis Belonio - inventor
- Darren Espanto - singer
