= Philippine Carabao Center =

Research institute in Nueva Ecija, Philippines

- Sentro ng Pilipinas para sa Kalabaw
- Logo

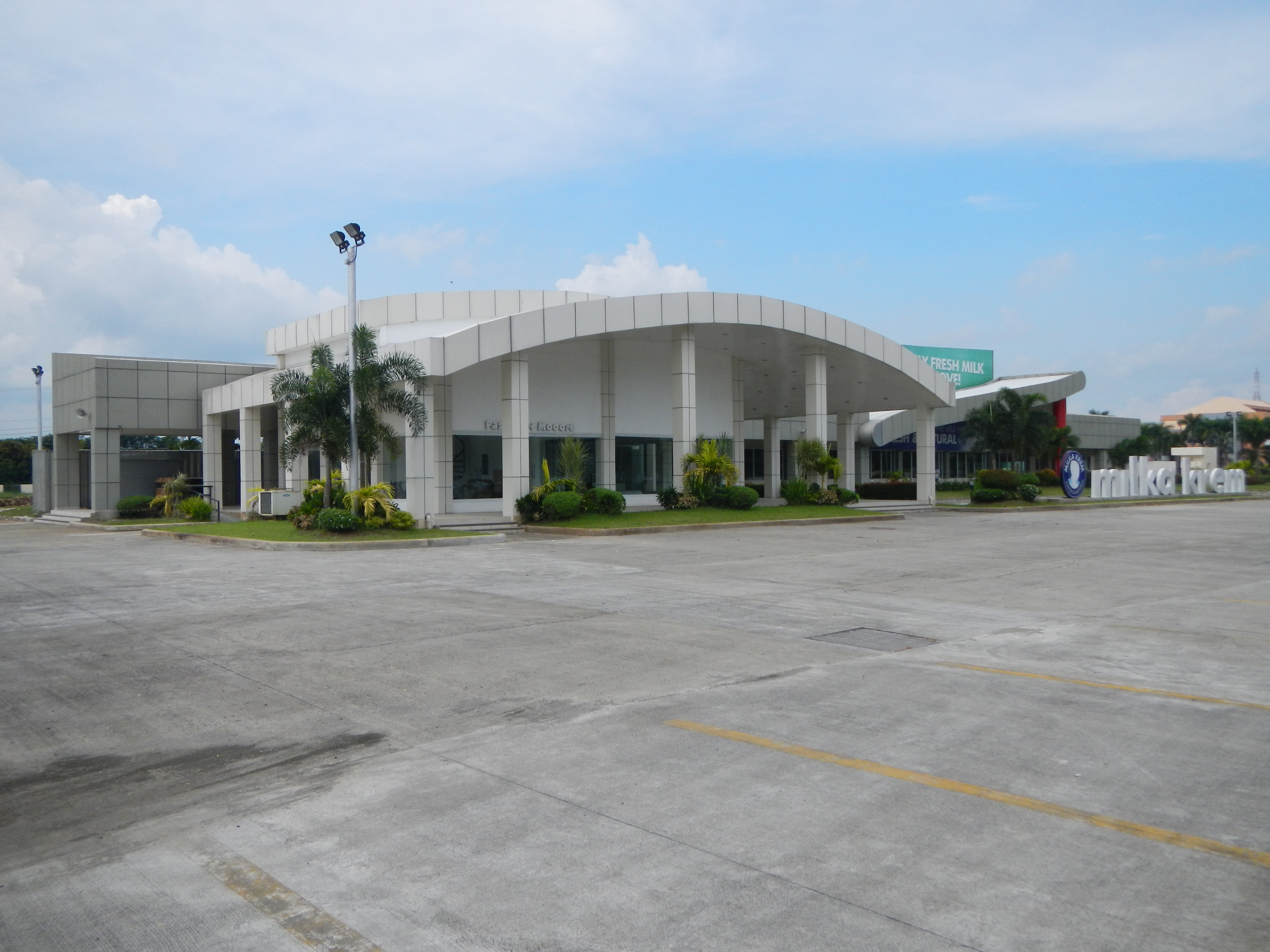
- Philippine Carabao Center

Agency overview
- Formed: May 26, 1992
- Preceding agency: Philippine Carabao Research and Development Center
- Headquarters: Muñoz, Nueva Ecija; 15°43′58″N 120°55′52″E
- Employees: 178 (2024)
- Annual budget: ₱595.7 million (2021)
- Agency executive: Claro Mingala, Executive Director (OIC)
- Parent agency: Department of Agriculture
- Website: www.pcc.gov.ph

The Philippine Carabao Center (PCC; Filipino: Sentro ng Kalabaw sa Pilipinas or Sentro ng Pilipinas para sa Kalabaw) an attached agency of the Department of Agriculture, was established at Muñoz in Nueva Ecija province in 1992 to breed and cross carabao based on high-yield Murrah buffalo (native breed of Haryana state of India) in the Philippines as a multi-purpose animal that can be raised for milk, meat, hide, and draft.

== History ==
It was set up in 1992 on a 40 hectares (99 acres) piece of land donated by Central Luzon State University on its main campus, initially with 6 network centers in 1992. 7 more network centers were added in 1994 bringing the total to 13. It was sponsored as a bill by the then senator Joseph Estrada and eventually enacted as a law through Republic Act 7307 i.e. the Philippine Carabao Act of 1992.

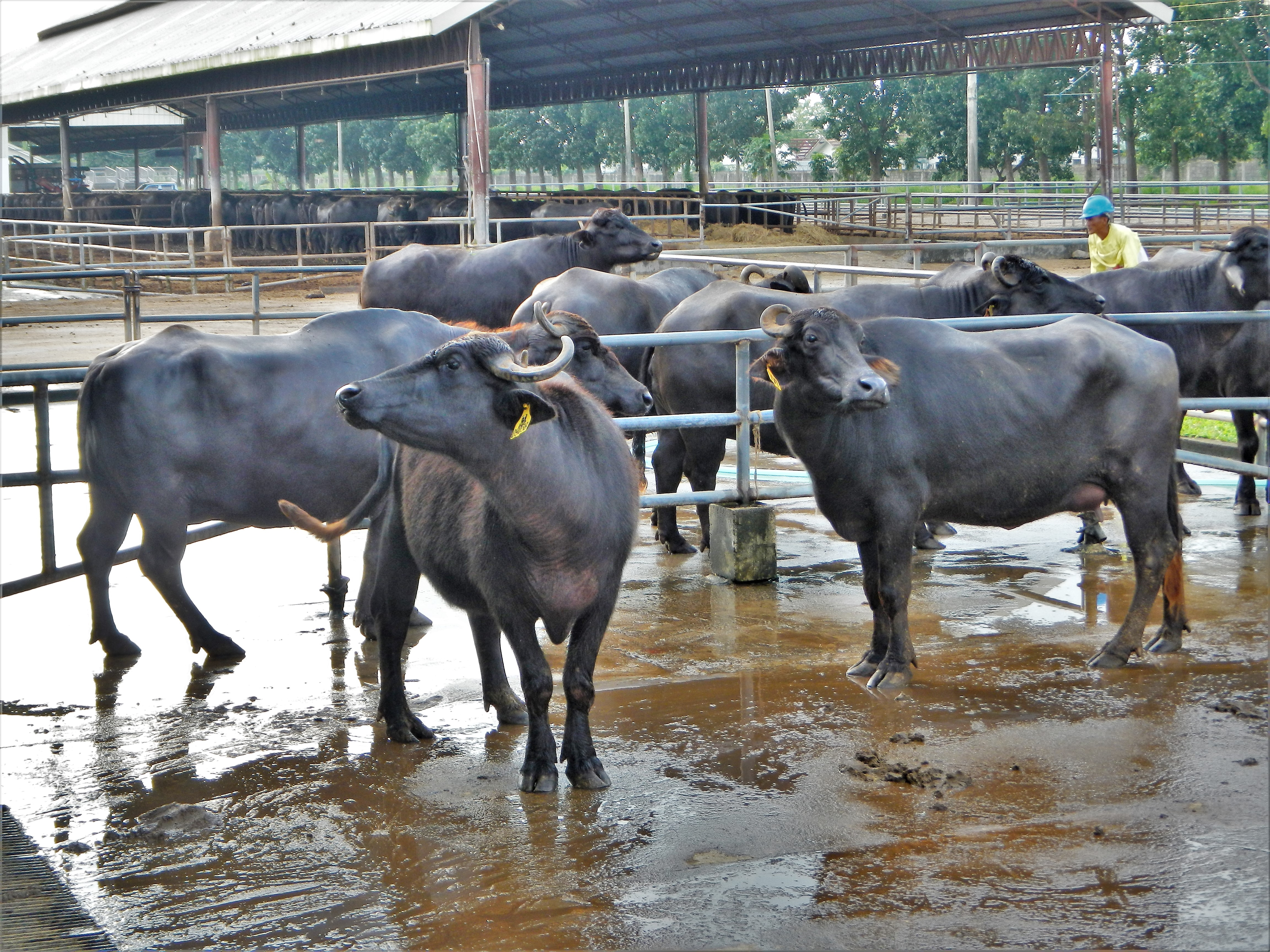
Indian-origin Murrah buffalo dairy breed of Asian water buffalo, at PCC imported from Bulgaria.

== Research and development ==
=== Reproduction technology ===
The PCC had some success in reproductive biotechnology in 2004 when the first test-tube buffalo was born on April 5, also the birthday of President Gloria Macapagal-Arroyo. Incidentally, the test-tube buffalo is a female and was named as "Glory" after the President.

From 2007 to 2009, the PCC was known to be researching on the process of cloning carabaos.

=== Milk yield improvement ===
Late in 2007, according to Filipino scientists, the Center located in Nueva Ecija initiated a study to breed the super water buffalo that could produce 4 to 18 liters of milk/day using gene-based technology. The majority of the funding came from the Department of Science and Technology. When this marker-assisted selection process is perfected it will allow the poor farmers to conserve their resources by raising only the best producers that are genetically selected soon after birth.

=== Taxonomy ===
In 2024, the PCC along with the Institute of Biology of the College of Science of the University of the Philippines Diliman proposed to revive the 1860 species classification that recognizes the carabao or swamp buffalo as a distinct species from the riverine buffalo. Currently the carabao (Bubalus bubalis carabanensis) and the riverine buffalo (Bubalus bubalis bubalis) are considered as subspecies of the domesticated buffalo (Bubalus bubalis)

== Network ==
PCC Regional Network
National Headquarters and Gene Pool	Muñoz, Nueva Ecija
Mariano Marcos State University	Batac, Ilocos Norte
Cagayan State University	Tuguegarao, Cagayan
Don Mariano Marcos Memorial State University	Rosario, La Union
Central Luzon State University	Muñoz, Nueva Ecija
University of the Philippines Los Baños	Los Baños, Laguna
Visayas State University	Baybay, Leyte
West Visayas State University	Calinog, Iloilo
La Carlota Stock Farm	La Carlota, Negros Occidental
Ubay Stock Farm	Ubay, Bohol
Mindanao Livestock Production Center	Kalawit, Zamboanga del Norte
Central Mindanao University	Maramag, Bukidnon
University of Southern Mindanao	Kabacan, Cotabato

== International partners ==
Philippine Carabao Center runs an International Buffalo Knowledge Resource Services (IBKRS) in partnership with the following institutes:

- India
  - Central Institute for Research on Buffaloes (CIRB) at Hisar in Haryana state
  - National Bureau of Animal Genetic Resources (NDRI) at Kernal in Haryana state
- Taiwan
  - Taiwan Livestock Research Institute
- Korea
  - National Institute of Animal Science

== Gallery ==
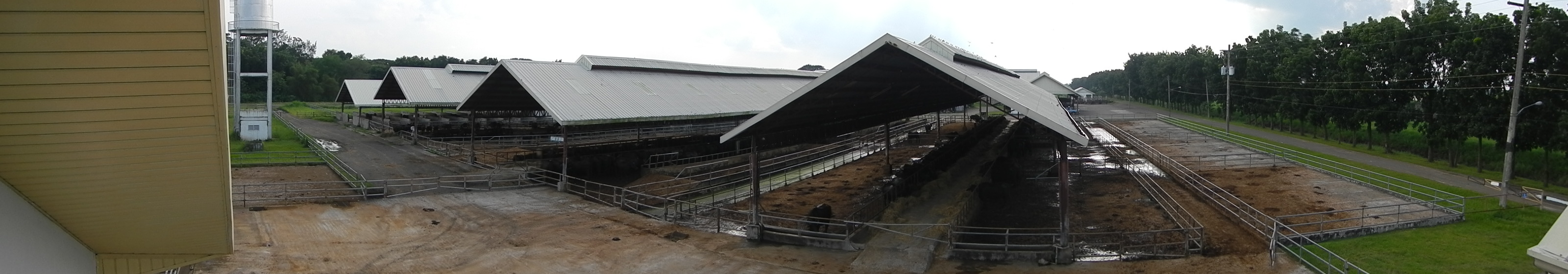
Super carabaos from the view deck

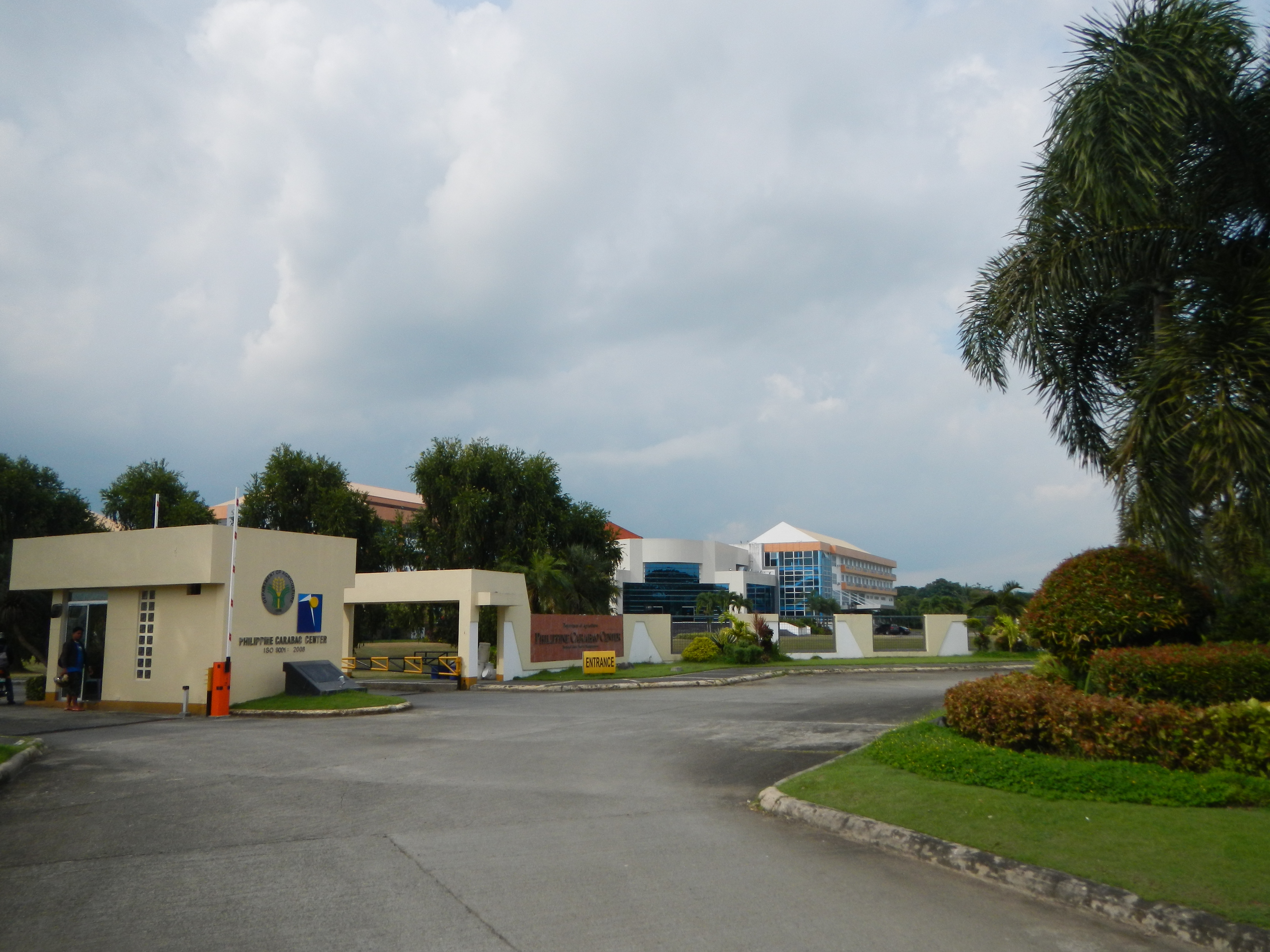
PCC facade, National Headquarters and Gene Pool, Science City of Muñoz, Nueva Ecija

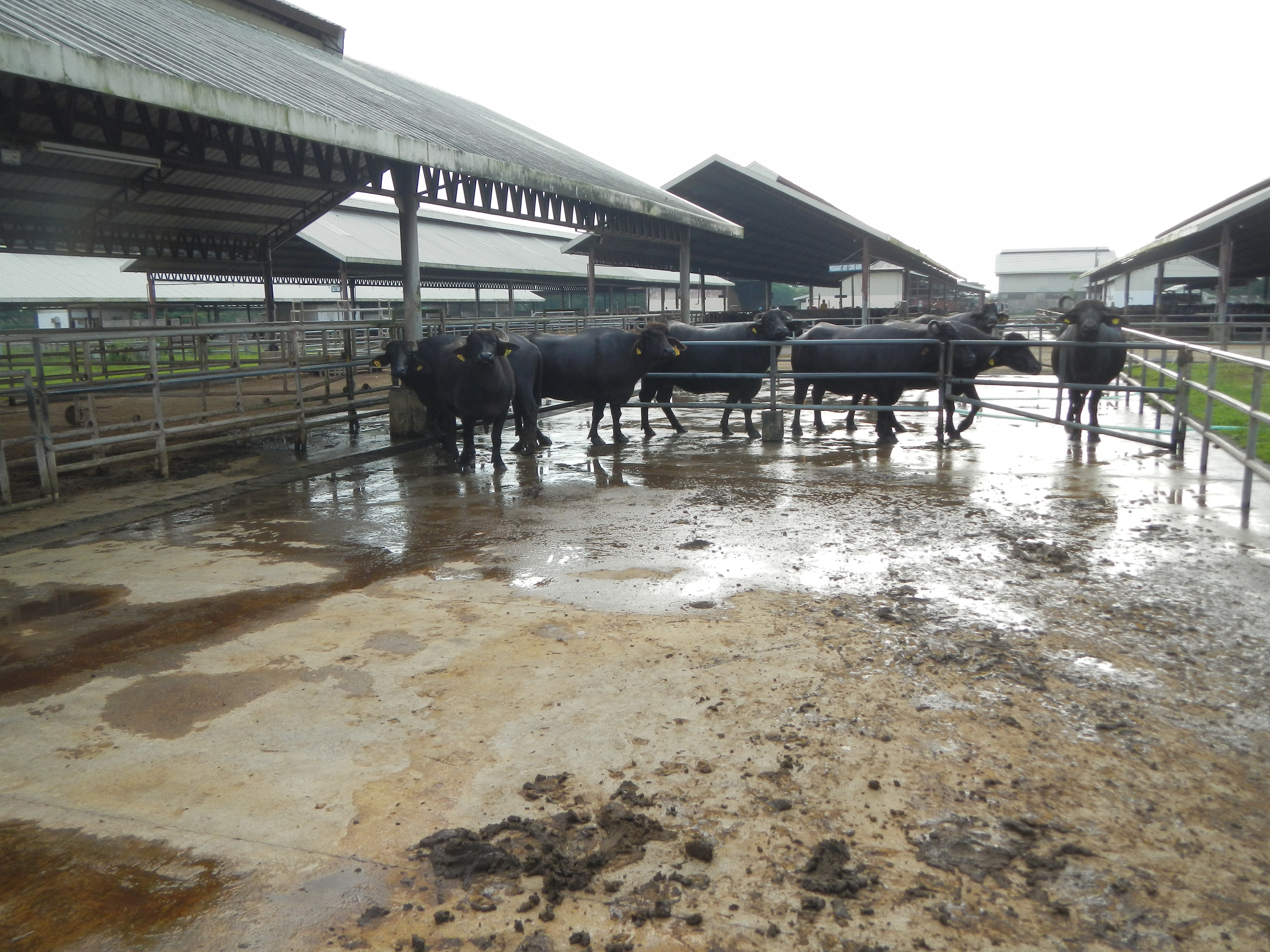
The super carabaos at the milking and breeding station

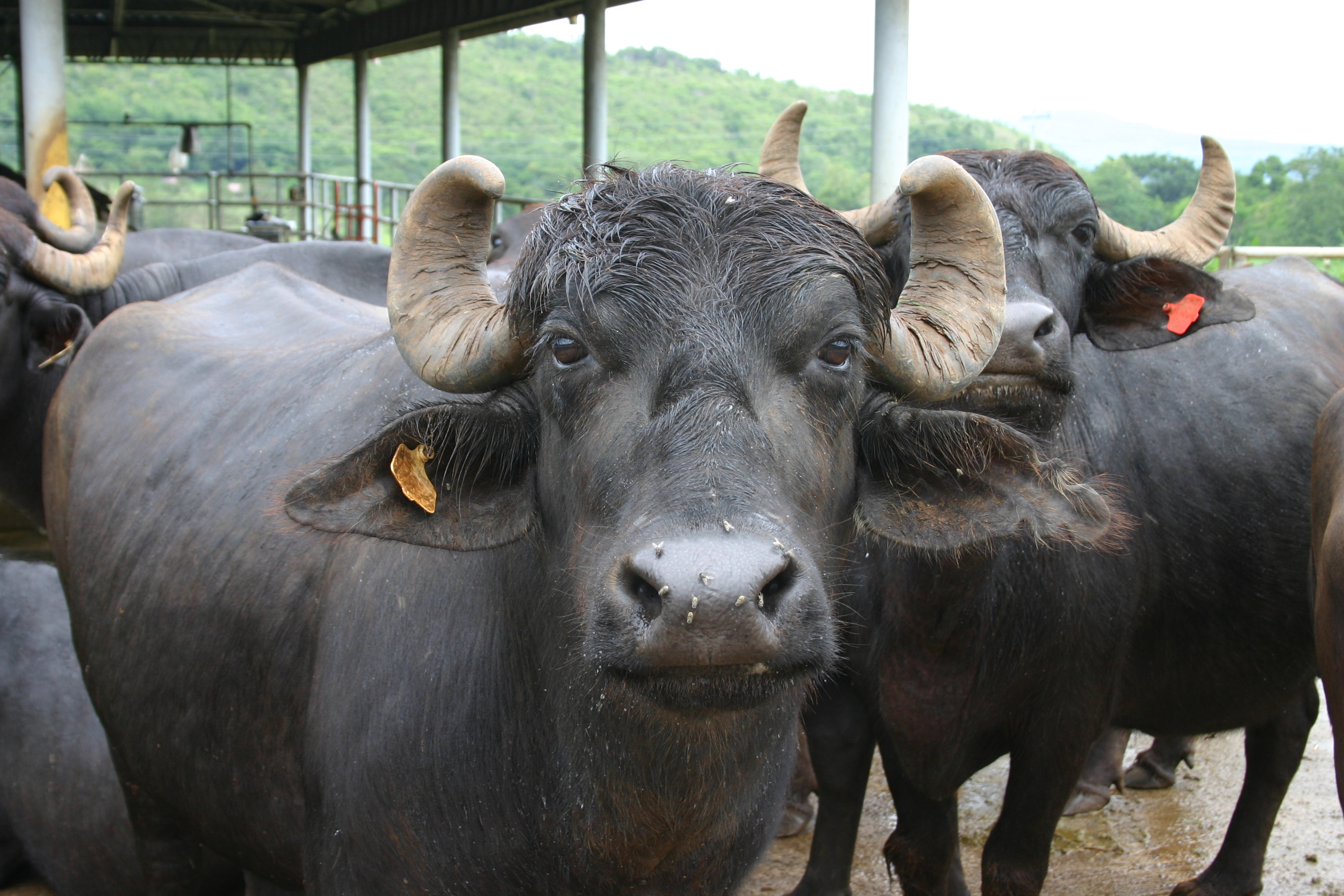
The Murrah buffaloes in the Philippine Carabao Center's outlet in Central Mindanao University, Bukidnon

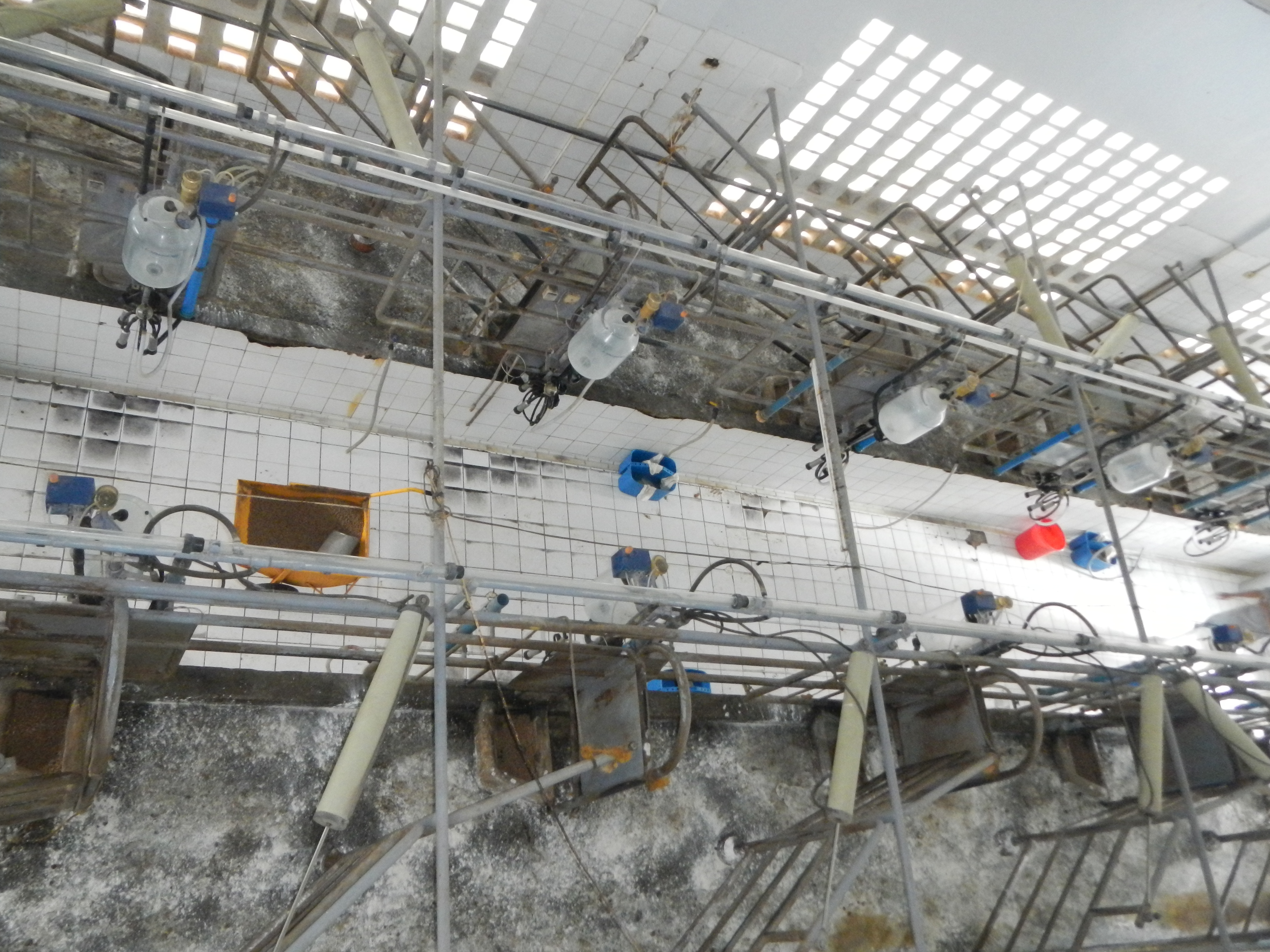
Milking from the view deck

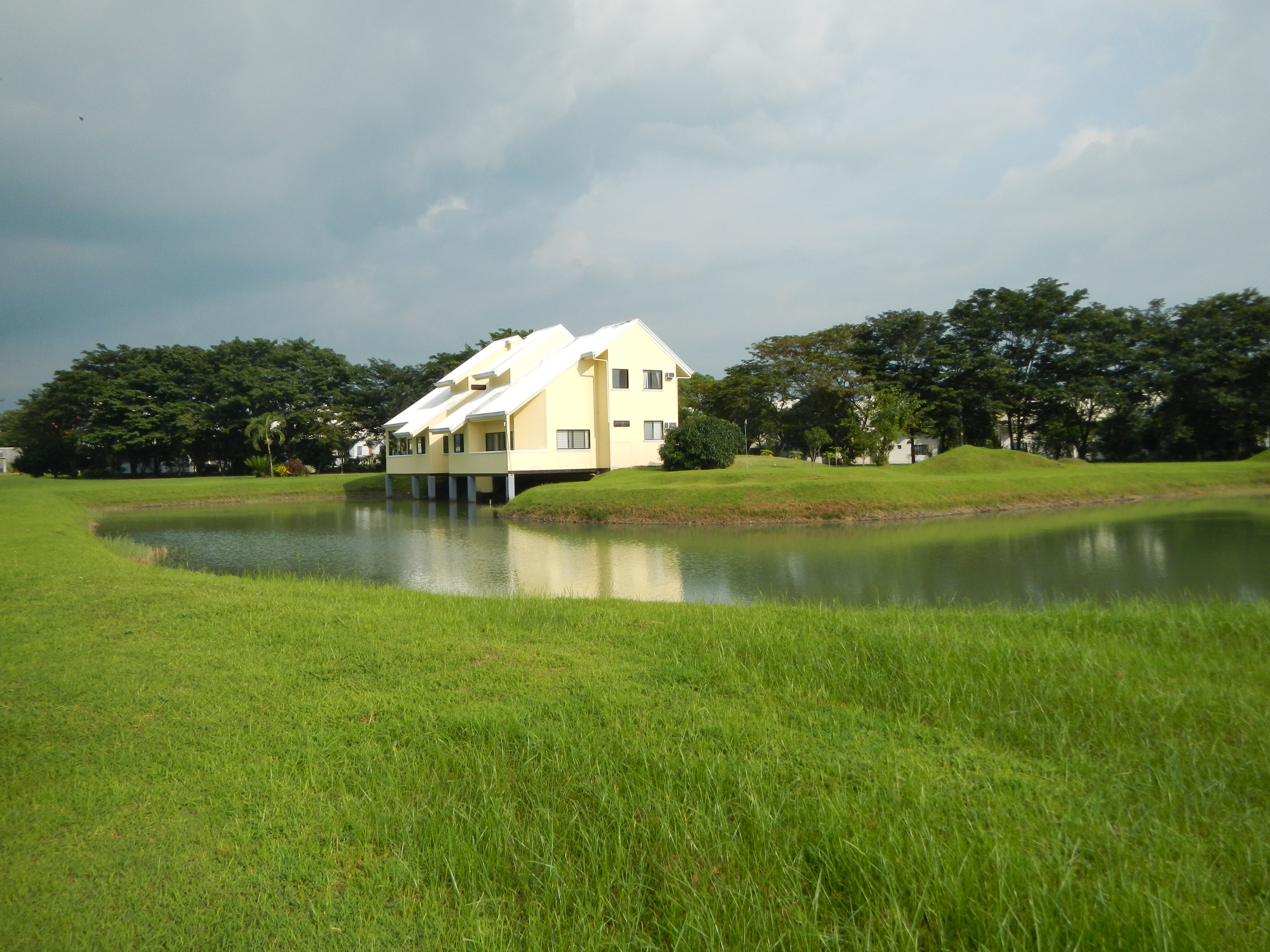
Housing of the officers

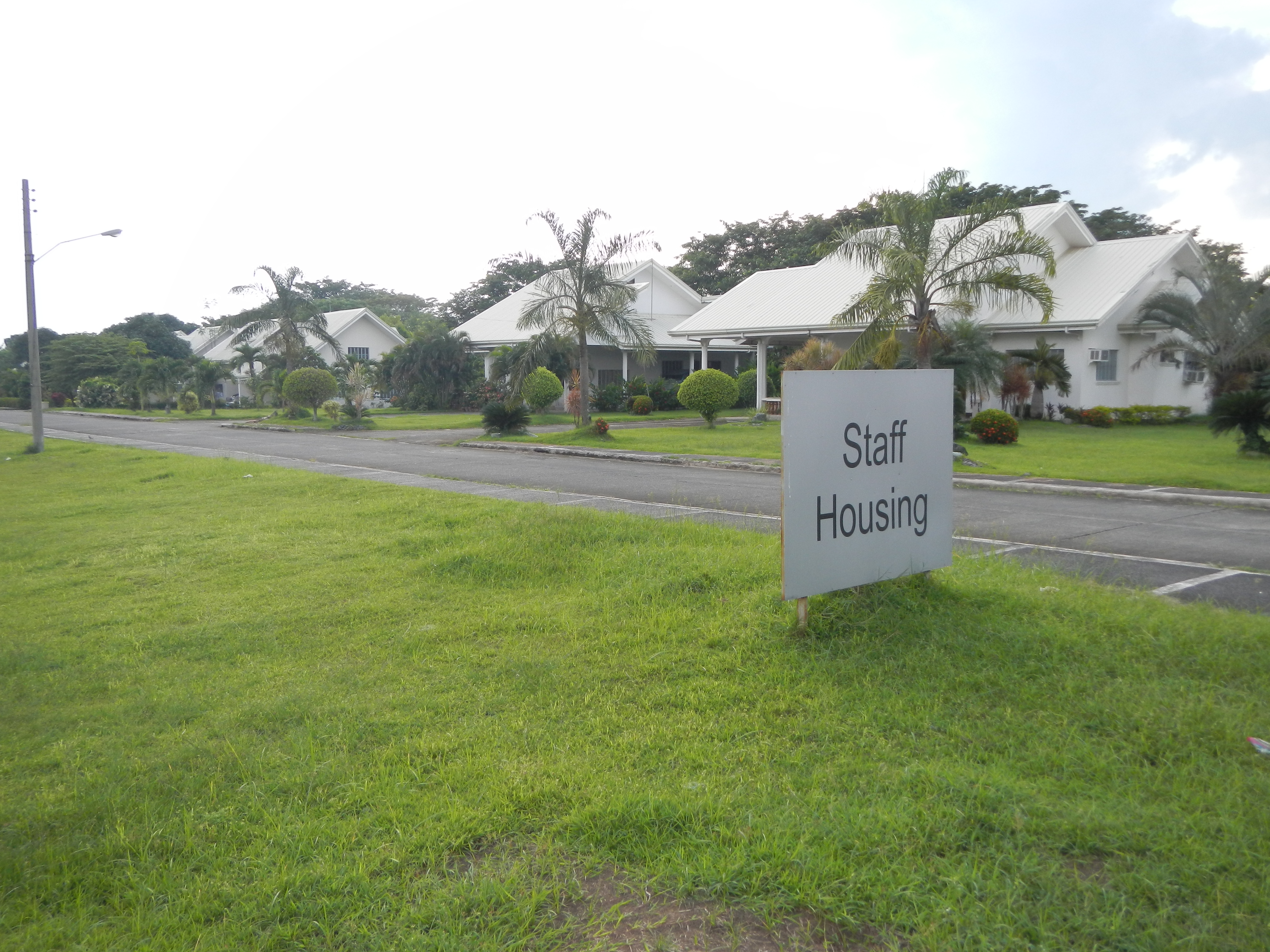
Staff housing

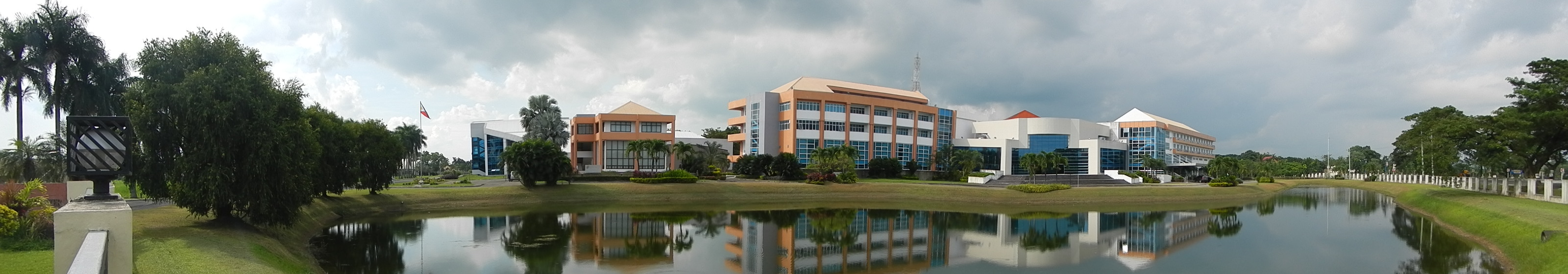
Facade

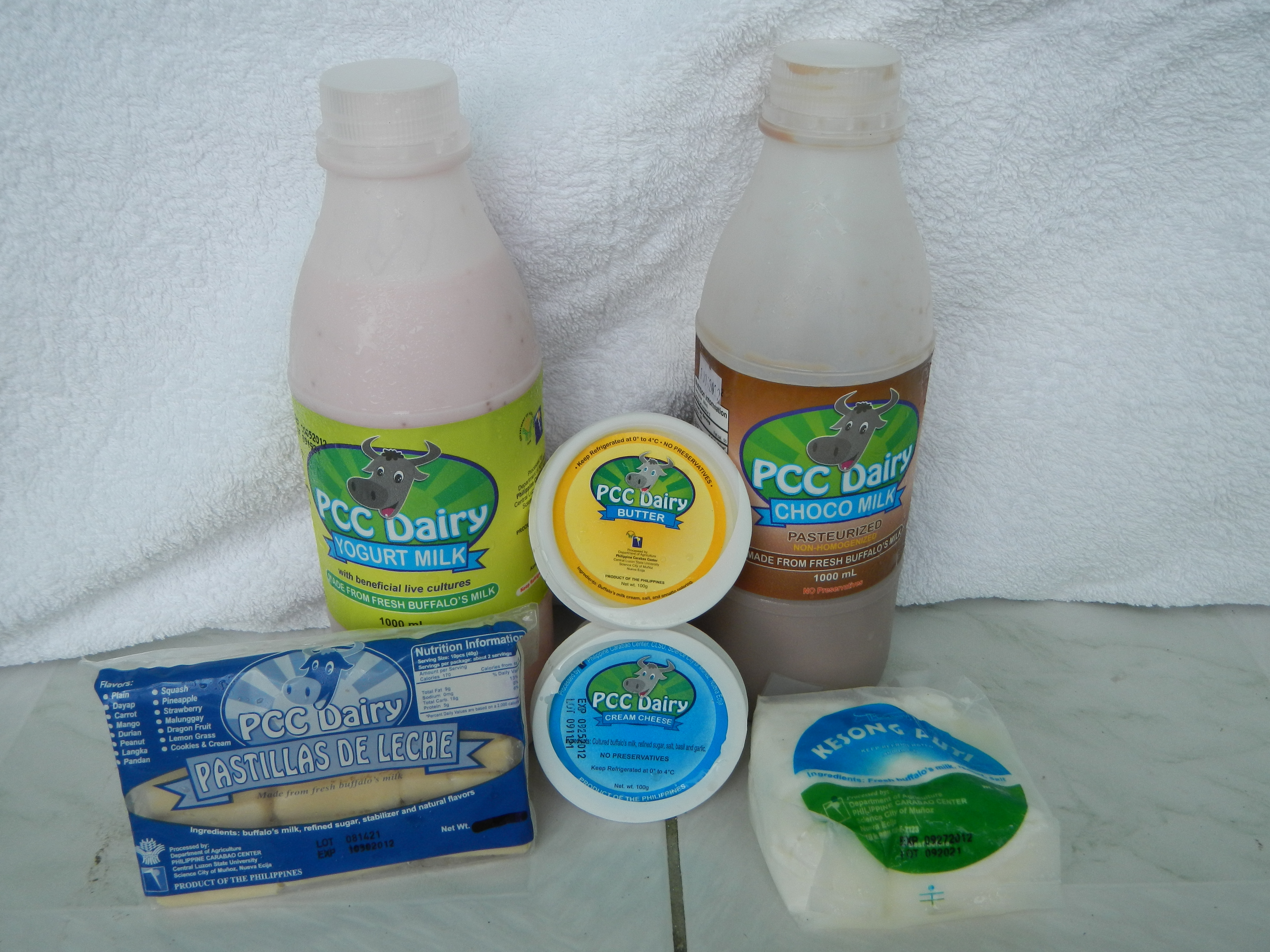
The main products of Dairy Plant, Milka Krem, Philippine Carabao Center

== See also ==
- Murrah buffalo
- Central Institute for Research on Buffaloes, Hisar, India
- Government Livestock Farm, Hisar, India
