= Central Luzon State University =

Public university in Nueva Ecija, Philippines

- Pamantasang Pampamahalaan ng Gitnang Luzon (Filipino)
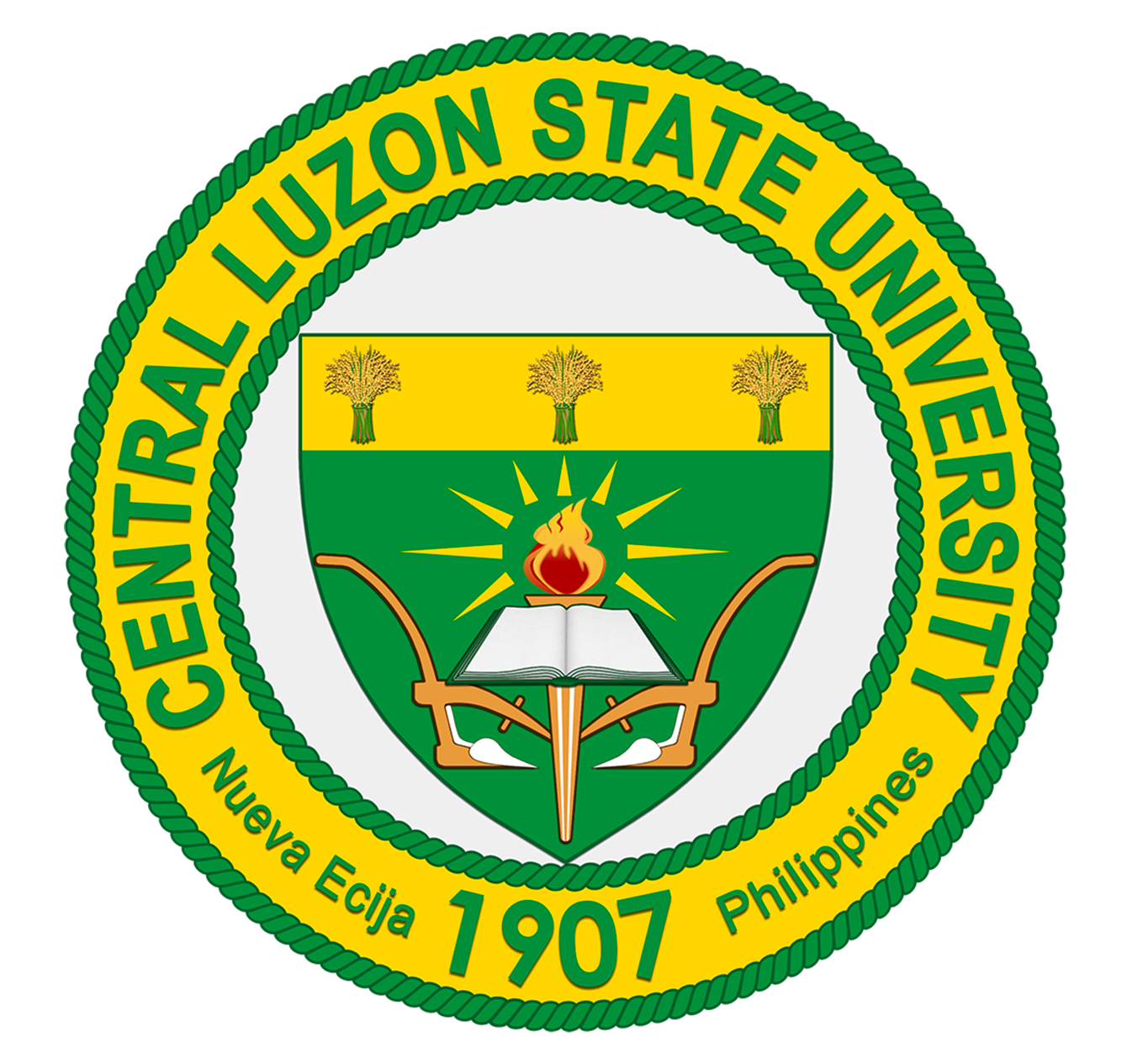
- The CLSU Seal
- Former names: Central Luzon Agricultural School (1907), Central Luzon Agricultural College (1954)
- Motto: Where Difference is Created
- Type: State university
- Established: 1907
- Accreditation: Accrediting Agency of Chartered Colleges and Universities in the Philippines
- President: Hon. Evaristo A. Abella
- Students: 14,000+
- Location: Maharlika Highway, Muñoz, Nueva Ecija, Philippines
- Newspaper: CLSU Collegian
- University Hymn: CLSU Hymn
- Colors: Green and Yellow
- Nickname: CLSU Green Cobras/Lady Cobras
- Website: www.clsu.edu.ph

Central Luzon State University (CLSU; Tagalog: Pamantasang Pampamahalaan ng Gitnang Luzon; Ilocano: Universidad Estatal ti Tengnga a Luzon) is a public research university on a 658-hectare campus in Muñoz, Nueva Ecija, Philippines. It is the lead agency of the Muñoz Science Community and the seat of the Regional Research and Development Center in Central Luzon. To date, CLSU is one of the premiere institutions for agriculture in the Philippines and in Southeast Asia known for its research in aquaculture, ruminants, crops, orchard, and water management.

CLSU is the first comprehensive state university to undergo institutional accreditation. It is a declared Cultural Property of the Philippines with the code of PH-03-0027 due to its high historical, cultural, academical, and agricultural importance to the nation.

== History ==
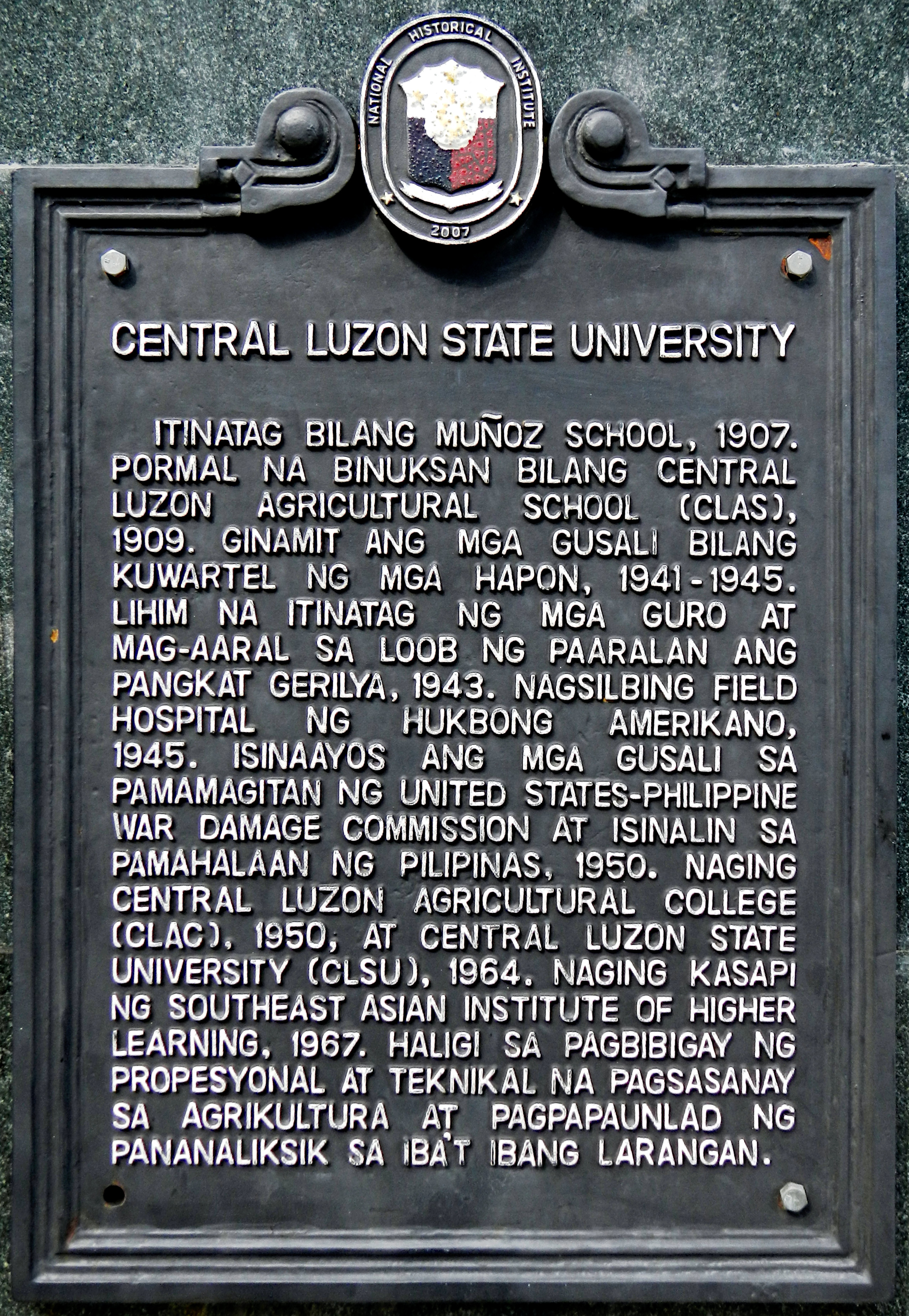
National historical marker installed in 2007 as part of the university's centennial celebration

Central Luzon State University is in the Science City of Muñoz, Nueva Ecija, Philippines. It started as a farm school and in 1907 became Central Luzon Agricultural School (CLAS) with the intention of promoting agriculture and mechanics arts. Later, it included the promotion of homemaking arts among its commitments.

In 1954, CLAS was converted into Central Luzon Agricultural College (CLAC) with the mission of promoting agricultural education. In 1964, it was elevated to a university—the Central Luzon State University—to provide advance instruction and technical and professional training in agriculture and mechanics arts, and promote research, literature, philosophy, sciences, technology and arts. Over the years, CLSU has been known as an agriculture-oriented institution.

=== 1989 protests ===
In 1989, groups of students and teachers protested the dismissal of 17 staff members and the delayed corruption cases against CLSU President Eliseo L. Ruiz at the Sandiganbayan, calling for Ruiz's dismissal, with some of the teachers committing to a hunger strike that lasted at least 40 days.

=== Contemporary period ===
In April 2007, CLSU celebrated its centenary.

Today, it has transformed into a comprehensive university offering undergraduate and graduate courses. Lately, it has been designated as a zonal university in Luzon as one of the more respected institutions of higher learning in the Philippines.

The university is the lead agency of the Muñoz Science Community and the seat of the Regional Research and Development Center in the Central Luzon. To date, CLSU is one of the premier institutions of agriculture in Southeast Asia known for its breakthrough research in aquatic culture (especially of tilapia), ruminant, crops, orchard, and water management research.

On April 1, 2024, a Memorandum of understanding was signed by CLSU President Evaristo A. Abella, the University Extension Program Office, CLSU Vice President for Research and Extension Dr. Edgar A. Orden and Guimba Mayor Jesulito E. Galapon for the establishment of the Technology Village Development Program in Guimba. The TVDP is "an extension modality to create a hub of matured CLSU technologies within a community where local farmers can adopt the production of special purpose rice, mushroom, itik-Pinas, dairy goat and tilapia grow-out, among others", Donatelo Gabor, CLSU Strategic Communication office, said.

On April 12, 2024, CLSU Team CobraBytes won the second place with their tokenized educational credit system, allowing students to earn tokens for educational achievements and exchange them for materials within the university ecosystem.

== Campus ==
CLSU is on a 658 ha (1,630-acre) main campus in the Science City of Muñoz, 150 km (93 mi) north of Manila. It has a more than 1,000-hectare (2,500-acre) site for ranch-type buffalo production and forestry development up the hills of Carranglan town, in northern Nueva Ecija, 40 km (25 mi) from the main campus.

=== The Main Gate ===
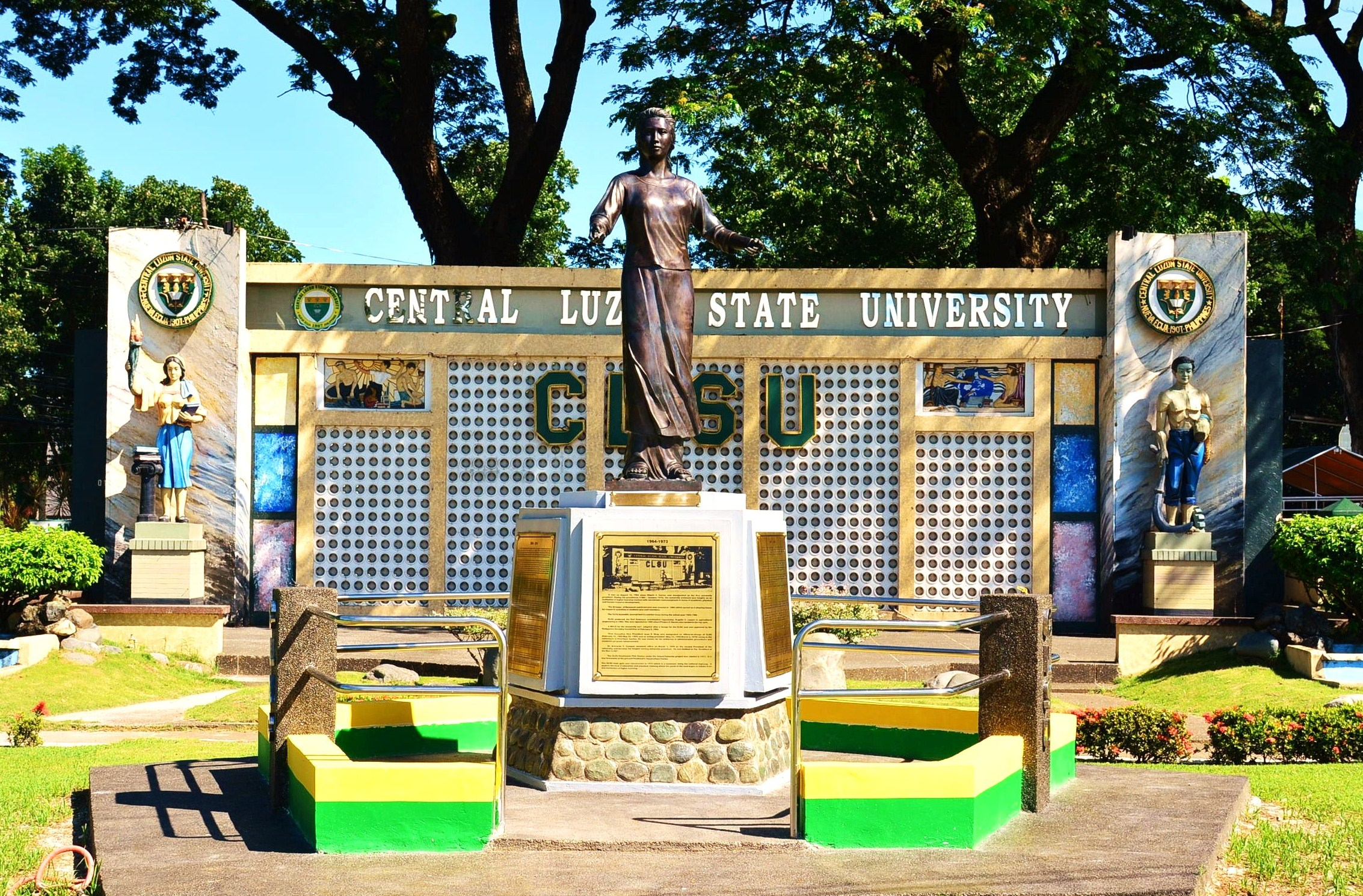
CLSU main gate

The main gate shows a farmer with his carabao and plow. School officials and students consider CLSU the biggest landmark in Muñoz. In the early 1900s, CLSU made a name by pioneering scientific farming, adopting the half-day academic work and half-day practicum, and promoting citizenship training.

Up to the time it became a university in 1964, the student government ran the affairs of what was then known as "Little Republic." Its governance was patterned after the setup of the national government and the yearly elections were a much anticipated event.

=== The Reimer's Hall ===
Built during the time of superintendent William Wade Head (1935–1936), was designed to show talking films, then a first in the province.

Made of wood, steel frame and concrete, with a galvanized iron roof, the building was later fitted with acoustics for cinema functions and bowling alleys. It was named Concordia Hall during the time of superintendent Christian Reimer and later renamed Reimer's Hall.

Equipped with a big stage, the 500-seat hall had been used to stage plays produced by students. In 1939, the school's first Filipino superintendent, Emeterio Asinas, improved the structure so it can hold functions and social affairs. The most significant affair held there was the inauguration of CLAC on January 6, 1952. Then President Elpidio Quirino and his defense secretary, Ramon Magsaysay, graced the event. Among the other prominent guests were senators, congressmen, Cabinet members, diplomats, school officials and representatives of the country's top universities and colleges.

Magsaysay would have returned to Reimer's Hall on April 5, 1955, as Philippine president during the golden jubilee and graduation programs, but he died in a plane crash on March 17, 1955. He would have been conferred the honorary degree of doctor of agricultural education, CLAC continued with the program. Two empty chairs, draped in black, and a speaker's stand decorated with academic regalia, diploma and citations for Magsaysay were set up on the stage to remember the late president.

A modern auditorium was later built beside Reimer's Hall during the time of then CLSU president Amado Campos, who changed the complexion of the campus with his more than P45-million infrastructure build-up during his term from 1972 to 1986.

== Brief history ==
Central Luzon State University (CLSU) maintains a good reputation amongst institutions of higher education in the Philippines for the quality of education that it provides.

CLAS: On April 12, 1907, it started as a farm school, the Central Luzon Agricultural School (CLAS), through Executive Order No. 10 issued by then Governor General James F. Smith, James F. Smith. Its initial emphasis was on the development of skilled and technician-type graduates to meet the human resource requirements in the opening and cultivation of rich farmlands.

CLAS had a unique curriculum, promoting agriculture and mechanic arts which combined practicum and academic work. In time, CLAS became known as the "mother of vocational agriculture schools" in the country.

CLAC: The school was converted into Central Luzon Agricultural College (CLAC) on December 31, 1950, by virtue of Executive Order No. 393 issued by then President Elpidio Quirino to promote agricultural education. As a higher learning institution, CLAC distinguished itself as the first state college established by the Philippine government to promote agricultural education, agricultural engineering and home economics, among others.

CLSU: On June 18, 1964, CLAC was elevated into Central Luzon State University (CLSU) by virtue of Republic Act No. 4067 "to give professional and technical training in agriculture and mechanic arts; provide advance instruction; promote research, literature, philosophy, the sciences, technology and arts."

Having formerly focused primarily on agriculture, CLSU began offering various undergraduate and graduate courses.

The CLSU campus consists of a 658-hectare area in the Muñoz, 150 km (93 mi) north of Manila. On October 19, 2001, CLSU was launched as the Model Agri-Tourism Site for Luzon under the Philippine Agri-Tourism Program, a joint project of the Department of Agriculture and Department of Tourism.

=== Past presidents ===
Central Luzon Agricultural School (CLAS) 1907–1954

The American Superintendents
Name	Term
T.W. Thompson	1907–1909
C.D. Whipple	1909
George Whiting	1909–1910
Allen Helms	1910–1913
Kilmer Moe	1913–1922
James A. Wright	1922
Ernest H. Oesch	1923–1925
Sylvester G. Kelleher	1925–1928
Frederick Roth	1928–1929
Harry Comer	1929–1931
Carl Hartman	1931–1934
Arthur G. Spiller	1934–1935
William Wade Head	1935–1936
Christian Reimers	1936–1938

The Filipino Superintendents
Name	Term
Emeterio A. Asinas	1938–1941
Apolonio Ramos	1942–1945
Jose C. Saddul	1945–1949
Arcadio G. Matela	1945–1954

Central Luzon Agricultural College (CLAC) 1954–1964

The College Presidents
Name	Term
Arcadio G. Matela	1954–1959
Elias M. Caray	1959–1960
Dr. Hilario J. Santos	1961–1964

Central Luzon State University (CLSU)

University presidents
Name	Term
Dr. Hilario J. Santos	1964–1970
Dr. Amado C. Campos	1970–1986
Dr. Pedro A. Abella (Acting President)	1986–1987
Dr. Eliseo L. Ruiz	1987–1992
Dr. Fortunato A. Battad	1992–1999
Dr. Rodolfo C. Undan	1999–2007
Dr. Ruben C. Sevilleja	2007–2014
Dr. Tereso A. Abella	2015–2019
Dr. Edgar A. Orden	2020–2023
Dr. Evaristo A. Abella	2024–Present

== Ranking ==
University rankings

Regional – Overall
- QS Asia: 601+ (2021)

The 2010 survey ranked the Central Luzon State University as sixth of the nine Top Universities for the following: Center of Excellence (COE) in Agriculture, Agricultural Engineering, Fisheries, Veterinary Medicine, Teacher Education; and as Centers of Development (COD) in Biology and Chemistry.

In 2014 the university's ranking dropped to seventh for the following Center of Excellence (COE): agricultural engineering, agriculture, biology, fisheries, teacher education, veterinary medicine and in Centers of Development (COD): chemistry.

In 2015, the World Ranking Web of Universities released the list of top 100 colleges and universities in which Central Luzon State University was ranked at 39th.

In June 2015, Central Luzon State University ranked 21st in the Nationwide Ranking of Universities based on board passers.

As of December 2020, CLSU is among the top 14 universities in the Philippines that is listed in Asia's Higher Education Institutions (HEIs) by Quacquarelli Symonds.

In 2026, CLSU dominated in the Region III rankings, consistently being 1st place. The university was also listed at the Top 15 school in the entire country in the EduRank 2026 rankings, overpowering most schools in Metro Manila and Greater Manila area. It was noted for publishing 1,434 scientific papers that have garnered 14,178 citations. It also secured top-tier national rankings in the following disciplines on a national-level: 2nd in Animal Science, 3rd in Veterinary Science, 5th in Agricultural Science, and 4th in Wildlife and Fisheries Management & Conservation.

== Institutes and centers ==
- University Graduate Program Office
- Information System Institute
- Institute of Sports, Physical Education and Recreation
- Institute for Climate Change and Environmental Management
- Center for Educational Resources and Development Services
- Center for Central Luzon Studies
- Expanded Tertiary Education Equivalency and Accreditation Program
- CLSU Open University

== Academics ==
CLSU is composed of:

- College of Agriculture
- College of Arts and Social Sciences
- College of Business and Accountancy
- College of Education
- College of Engineering
- College of Fisheries
- College of Home Science and Industry
- College of Science
- College of Veterinary Science and Medicine

In addition, it houses a University Science High School and an Institute of Graduate Studies.

Although the university has yet to establish separate colleges for fine arts, architecture, law, and medicine, the university has recently approved some student organizations for students inclined to some of those disciplines. Budget for college establishments and pitch calls for the national government remain as issues.

== Student activism ==
During the 1950s, the university had a very active activism culture which focused on land reform and the rights of farmers. Student activism again peaked in the university during the People Power Revolution which overthrew the Marcos dictatorship in Manila. The protest was a symbolism from the university's students to abolish martial rule and remove the dictator Marcos from the presidency. With the advent of democracy, activism waned and eventually was downgraded by the 1990s. A period of around 3 decades showed no or minimal activism culture within the university. One incident during this period was an exception, where in 2007, a freshman student was killed by 10 people through hazing by the fraternity Tau Gamma Phi. Some students led a prayer rally and pushed the administrators to act and seek justice. The fraternity involved was permanently removed from campus.

In 2016, amid the brutal drug war which killed thousands of Filipinos, some student organizations not backed by the student council began proposing for the return of activism to the campus culture to promote student participation in national-level activism. In 2017, the university student council did not participate in the nationwide Day of Protest against extrajudicial killings during the Philippine drug war. The university student council also did not condemn both the national government's threat to declare martial rule and president Duterte's positive declarations about the dictator Marcos. These moves by the university student council was seen by various student organizations as a betrayal. IMPACT, a student organization, was the first to vocally came out and participate on September 21, 2017 during the Day of Protest through the "Alpas rally", beginning the first act of student activism in CLSU since 1986. The organization vowed to initiate the rally annually to mobilize student participation and positive activism. In 2021, after an official from the National Intelligence Coordination Agency Region 3 (NICA-III) red-tagged members of the CLSU community, the university student council vehemently condemned the act. The move was the first instance, post-EDSA, where the university student council condemned red-tagging. In October 2024, the CLSU Collegian, the official student publication of the university, condemned the red-tagging incident during an NSTP event, where organizers disallowed the recording of the event. In February 2025, CLSU students participated in the People Power Revolution commemoration with backing from the university student council. In April 2025, with activism and student participation integrated in the student culture, the CLSU Collegian condemned the red-tagging of one of the university's students by civilian-clothed government agents. In June 2026, after a major red-tagging incident occurred in campus by government agents, the CLSU community mobilized a lightning rally in support of the newly elected University Supreme Student Council (USSC) president, who was one of those attacked by red-taggers. For the first time in the university's century-old history, the CLSU President released a statement, in support of the USSC, vehemently condemning the "red-tagging, harassment, intimidation, discrimination, and other acts violating the rights and freedom of every Sielesyuan."
