= Guimba =

Municipality in Nueva Ecija, Philippines

- Municipality
- Municipality of Guimba
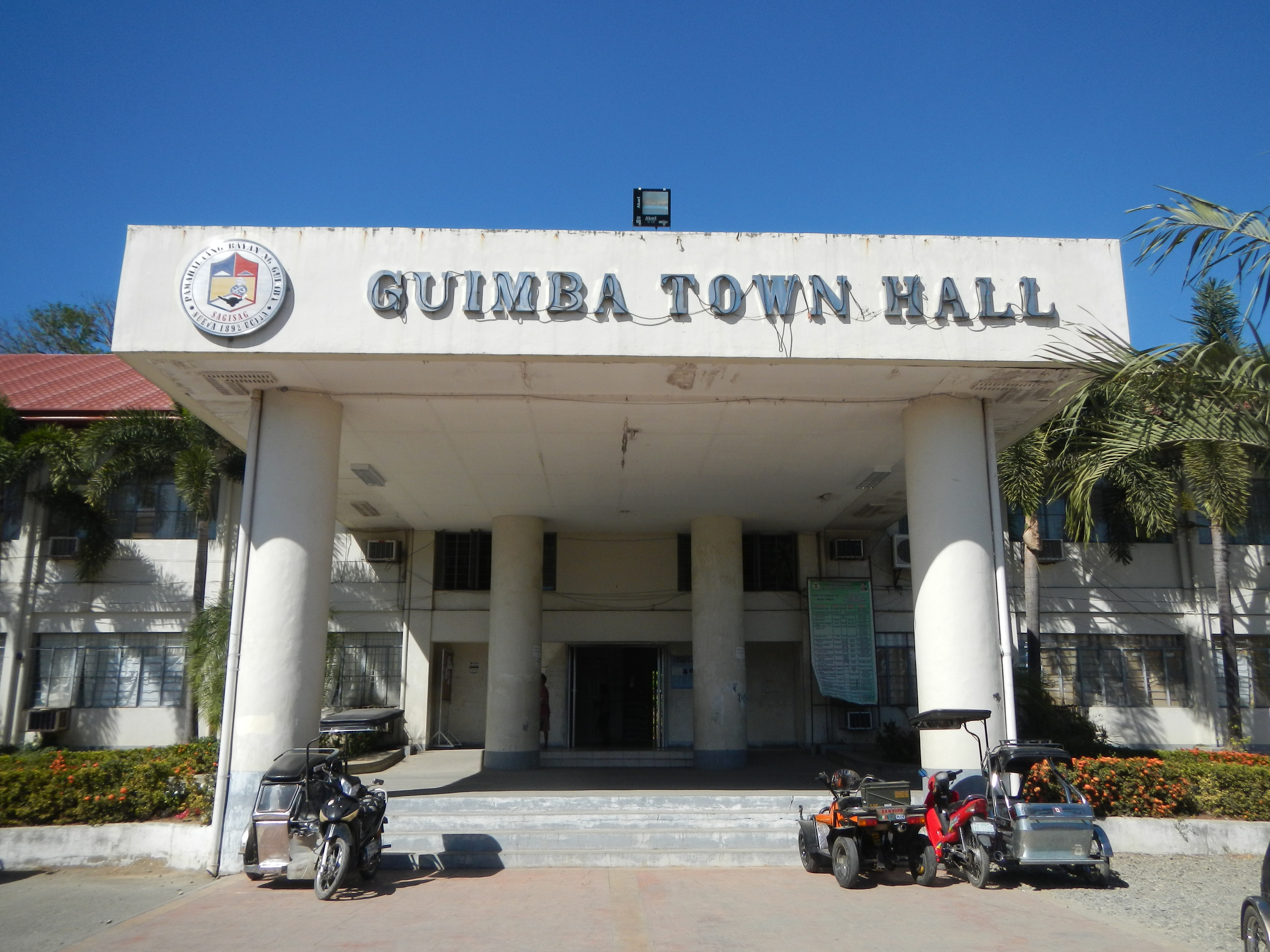
- Guimba Town Hall

- Seal
- Nicknames: Mushroom Capital of Nueva Ecija; Organic Farming Capital of Nueva Ecija
- Map of Nueva Ecija with Guimba highlighted
- Interactive map of Guimba
- Location within the Philippines
- Coordinates: 15°39′38″N 120°45′54″E
- Country: Philippines
- Region: Central Luzon
- Province: Nueva Ecija
- District: 1st district
- Founded: 1897
- Barangays: 64 (see Barangays)

Government
  - Type: Sangguniang Bayan
  - Mayor: Jesulito Galapon
  - Vice Mayor: John Carlo Dizon
  - Representative: Mikaela Angela B. Suansing
  - Municipal Council: Members: John Carlo Dizon; Stephanie Alvarez; Kent Natividad; Julius Gregfort Lumang; Anthony Ubaldo; Virgilio Fabros; Johnny Estabillo; Bonbon M. Dizon
  - Electorate: 81,532 voters (2025)

Area
  - Total: 245.29 km^{2} (94.71 sq mi)
- Elevation: 37 m (121 ft)
- Highest elevation: 52 m (171 ft)
- Lowest elevation: 25 m (82 ft)

Population (2024 census)
  - Total: 131,468
  - Density: 535.97/km^{2} (1,388.2/sq mi)
  - Households: 31,574

Economy
  - Income class: 1st municipal income class
  - Poverty incidence: 12.24% (2023)
  - Revenue: ₱ 509.1 million (2024)
  - Assets: ₱ 2,342 million (2024)
  - Expenditure: ₱ 506.1 million (2024)
  - Liabilities: ₱ 1,011 million (2024)

Service provider
  - Electricity: Nueva Ecija 2 Area 1 Electric Cooperative (NEECO 2 A1)
- Time zone: UTC+8 (PST)
- ZIP code: 3115
- PSGC: 0304911000
- IDD : area code: +63 (0)44
- Native languages: Ilocano; Tagalog
- Website: guimba.gov.ph

Guimba, officially the Municipality of Guimba (Tagalog: Munisipalidad ng Guimba; Ilocano: Ili ti Guimba; Pangasinan: Baley na Guimba), is a municipality in the province of Nueva Ecija, Philippines. According to the 2024 census, it has a population of 131,468 people.

It was incorporated by the King of Spain by virtue of a royal decree in 1897.

== Etymology ==
Guimba came from the Ilocano word 'gebba' which refers to the process of heating or fire-hardening molded clay pots in a pit until they become reddish, durable, and ready for use.

Local lore states that when Spanish colonizers arrived, they asked the potters for the name of the place '¿Cómo se llama este lugar?'. Misunderstanding the question as an inquiry into their activity, the natives replied "GEBBA" while pointing at their work. The Spaniards recorded the word as 'GHEBHA', which eventually evolved and was hispanized into Guimba when the town was officially founded as a pueblo in the province of Nueva Ecija.

== History ==
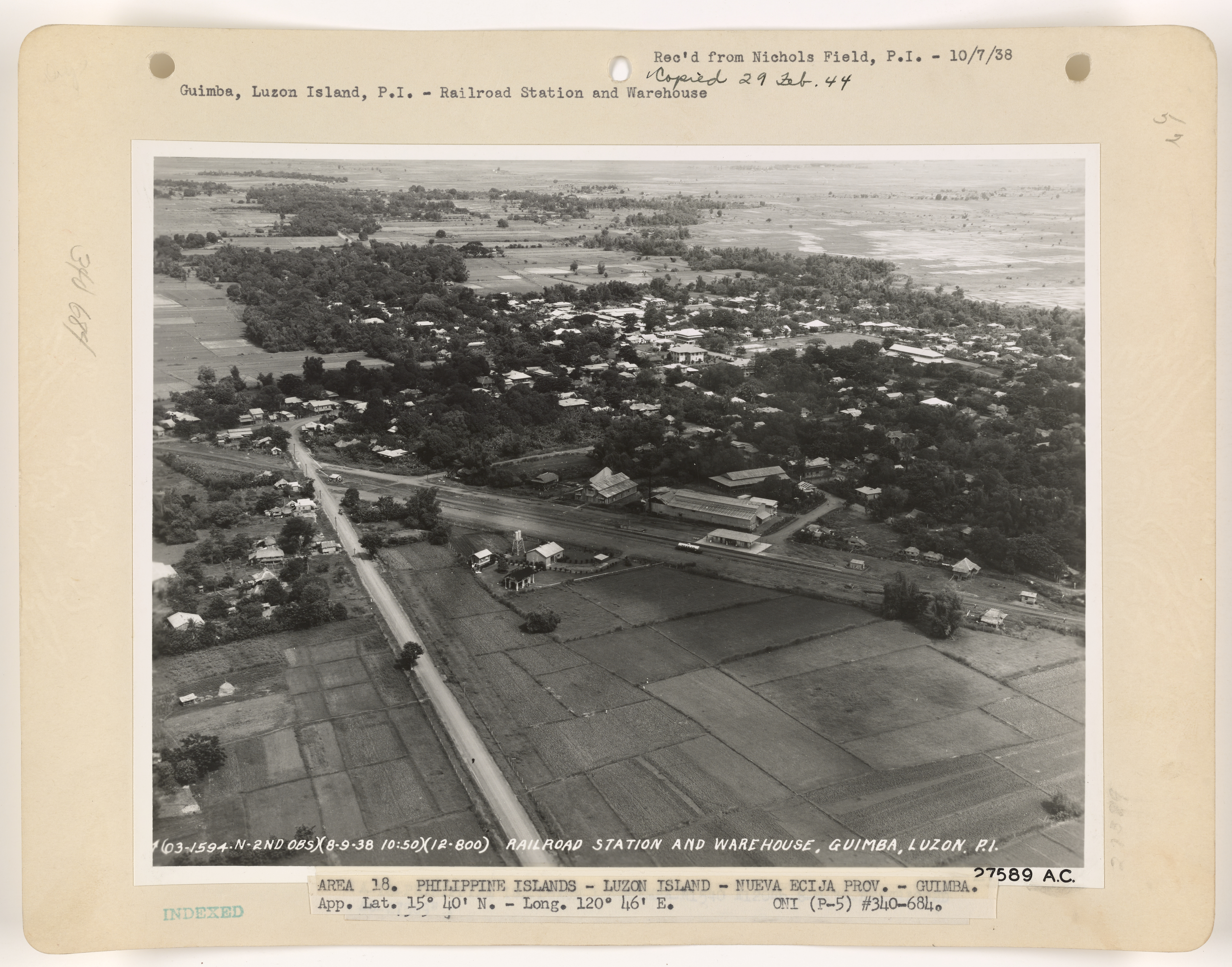
Aerial view of Guimba, circa 1930s

What is now the town of Guimba was once a vast ecological rainforest which was part of the Central Luzon Rainforest during precolonial time, before the arrival of the Spanish. The area is believed to be inhabited by no permanent communities, rather, it is inhabited by hunter-gatherer societies, mainly Ilonggots. The area was once part of the huge territory that the Empire of Tondo, with its capital in a much forested Manila. In the collapse of the Empire of Tondo after the subjugation of Brunei, the area transitioned into a free zone once again, where hunter-gatherers abounded. The area is also believed to once have been visited by migrating Aetas, Cordillerans, Ilokanos, and Ilonggots.

The first Ilocano settlers, arriving in wooden carts and horsebacks, cleared the thick forests and planted the first rice seeds on February 20, 1865, according to an old record found by Guimba's former Parish priest, Rev. Agustin "Gus" Polong, MSC. They called the area 'San Juan de Guimba' in honor of the patron saint the settlers brought from Ilocos, San Juan, and combined it with the pot-making industry called 'gebba' which they used to do in the old land. Since then, rice became the primary agricultural crop in the area. Due to this, it became the province of Nueva Ecija's traditional top rice-producing area in the 20th century.

More settlers arrived mostly from the towns of Bacarra, Paoay, and Candon in the Ilocos. Among the families who came were the Galapons, Mateos, Cudals, Padres, Cayogs, Romanos, Silvestres, Capinpuyans, Batangans, Faigals, Ramoses, Sumawangs, and Catabonas. What would be the town of Guimba was a relatively organized community when the Spanish colonialists arrived and appointed Don Luis De Ocampo as the first Gobernadorcillo, and later, Don Pablo Ramos and Santiago Cudal.

The Spanish left and the Americans came and in 1912, the town's name was abbreviated to Guimba with Don Alfonso Faigal as the first Alcalde Mayor. St. John the Evangelist remained its patron saint. The first municipal hall was also built during this year in what is now known as Faigal Street. The Plaza Municipal evolved and what became the public market opened.

A foot bridge was constructed during the administration of the late Agustin Vigilia, Alcalde Mayor. This foot bridge was constructed across the Binituran River leading to the northern barrios like San Andres, Balbalino, Guiset, Baybayabas, Cinence, Nangabulan to barangay Talugtug from the Parairo Street. Later, the bridge was demolished and transferred to the present site north of Faigal St. This was known as Faigal Bridge going to the north, to the municipality of Talugtug. Other infrastructures were put up with the public market and cleared the space for the Municipal Plaza, now the midtown municipal park.

In 1941, during the Japanese regime, Juan Villamar was appointed Municipal Mayor. During World War II, the Imperial Japanese military forces entered and occupied Guimba in 1942. At daybreak of January 26, to February 15, 1945, advance reconnaissance units of the American troops under the U.S. Army 6th Infantry Division and aided by the local Filipino soldiers of the Philippine Commonwealth Army 2nd, 22nd, 25th and 26th Infantry Division liberated Guimba and, within hours, established outposts nine miles farther to the east along the Licab River and La Paz. Combined U.S. and Philippine Commonwealth military forces liberated the town of Guimba in 1945 and ended World War II.

In 1963, Dr. Virgilio Calica was the Mayor and it was during his term that the old Municipal Hall was constructed, the present site of the present municipal hall constructed in year 2004. This building was demolished during the administration of Jose Bopet Dizon and the new Municipal Hall was constructed and occupied in 2006.

In 2006, Guimba became a first class municipality.

== Geography ==
Guimba is located on the western part of the province. It is 152 kilometres (94 mi) north-west of Manila, the country's capital, 36 kilometres (22 mi) from Cabanatuan, and 50 kilometres (31 mi) from Palayan, the provincial capital.

=== Land ===
Guimba covers a land area of 25,853.2330 hectares. It have three recognized types of soil in its territory:

- Bantug Clay loam
- Guingua slit loam
- San Fabian Clay loam

=== Barangays ===
Guimba is politically subdivided into 64 barangays. Each barangay consist of 7 puroks and some have sitios.

Four are considered urban barangays while 60 are classified as rural barangays.

- Agcano
- Ayos Lomboy
- Bacayao
- Bagong Barrio
- Balbalino
- Balingog East
- Balingog West
- Banitan
- Bantug
- Bulakid
- Bunol
- Caballero
- Cabaruan
- Caingin Tabing Ilog
- Calem
- Camiing
- Cardinal
- Casongsong
- Catimon
- Cavite
- Cawayan Bugtong
- Consuelo
- Culong
- Escaño
- Faigal
- Galvan
- Guiset
- Lamorito
- Lennec
- Macamias
- Macapabellag
- Macatcatuit
- Manacsac
- Manggang Marikit
- Maturanoc
- Maybubon
- Naglabrahan
- Nagpandayan
- Narvacan I
- Narvacan II
- Pacac
- Partida I
- Partida II
- Pasong Intsik
- Saint John District (Poblacion)
- San Agustin
- San Andres
- San Bernardino
- San Marcelino
- San Miguel
- San Rafael
- San Roque
- Santa Ana
- Santa Cruz
- Santa Lucia
- Santa Veronica District (Poblacion)
- Santo Cristo District (Poblacion)
- Saranay District (Poblacion)
- Sinulatan
- Subol
- Tampac I
- Tampac II & III
- Triala
- Yuson

=== Climate ===
Climate data for Guimba, Nueva Ecija
| Month | Jan | Feb | Mar | Apr | May | Jun | Jul | Aug | Sep | Oct | Nov | Dec | Year |
|---|---|---|---|---|---|---|---|---|---|---|---|---|---|
| Mean daily maximum °C (°F) | 29 (84) | 30 (86) | 31 (88) | 33 (91) | 33 (91) | 31 (88) | 30 (86) | 29 (84) | 29 (84) | 30 (86) | 30 (86) | 29 (84) | 30 (87) |
| Mean daily minimum °C (°F) | 19 (66) | 19 (66) | 20 (68) | 22 (72) | 23 (73) | 24 (75) | 24 (75) | 24 (75) | 23 (73) | 22 (72) | 21 (70) | 20 (68) | 22 (71) |
| Average precipitation mm (inches) | 4 (0.2) | 6 (0.2) | 7 (0.3) | 12 (0.5) | 61 (2.4) | 89 (3.5) | 96 (3.8) | 99 (3.9) | 81 (3.2) | 88 (3.5) | 37 (1.5) | 13 (0.5) | 593 (23.5) |
| Average rainy days | 2.5 | 3.0 | 4.1 | 6.3 | 15.8 | 19.4 | 22.5 | 21.6 | 20.1 | 17.5 | 9.6 | 4.0 | 146.4 |
Source: Meteoblue (modeled/calculated data, not measured locally)

There are two types of climate in the town. Dry season from November to June. And rainy seasons from July to October.

== Demographics ==
Population census of Guimba

| Year | Pop. | ±% p.a. |
|---|---|---|
| 1903 | 7,218 | — |
| 1918 | 15,490 | +5.22% |
| 1939 | 27,681 | +2.80% |
| 1948 | 33,029 | +1.98% |
| 1960 | 38,148 | +1.21% |
| 1970 | 50,261 | +2.79% |
| 1975 | 55,781 | +2.11% |
| 1980 | 58,847 | +1.08% |

| Year | Pop. | ±% p.a. |
|---|---|---|
| 1990 | 73,363 | +2.23% |
| 1995 | 77,935 | +1.14% |
| 2000 | 87,295 | +2.46% |
| 2007 | 96,116 | +1.34% |
| 2010 | 104,894 | +3.23% |
| 2015 | 118,655 | +2.38% |
| 2020 | 127,653 | +1.55% |
| 2024 | 131,468 | +0.71% |

Source: Philippine Statistics Authority

== Economy ==
Poverty incidence of Guimba (%)

Source: Philippine Statistics Authority

Guimba is one of the most developed and fastest growing municipalities in the province of Nueva Ecia, together with the towns of Talavera and Cabiao. Guimba has experienced rapid urban growth in the past few years. The town has an employment rate of 74%

Most Guimbanians derive their income from agriculture. As such, the agriculture sector ranks first in terms of generating employment for the populace. At the end of year 2006, Guimba had a total labor force of 38,120.

Guimba economy revolves mainly on agriculture. However, there are also cottages, small and medium scale industries. Local producers are involved in the manufacture of furniture, food processing, panara making, native rice cakes, palay buying, auto parts, clothing, subdivisions, importing, cosmetics, medicine, and construction.

As of 2017, Guimba has a total income of P289,497,138.89; assets of P556,825,821.59; liabilities of P165,318,650.14, and equity of P296,965,545.59

== Government ==
=== Local government ===
Municipal elected official (2025–present):

- Jesulito E. Galapon*, Mayor
- John Carlo P. Dizon, Vice Mayor
- Councilors:
  - Kent C. Natividad
  - Dianne Beltran
  - Angel Santos
  - Julius Gregfort DG. Lumang
  - Nicole Bernardino
  - Dino Dacanay
  - Leonardo DC. Garcia
  - Remedios D. Agapito

=== List of former mayors ===
Spanish Period:

1. Don Luis de Ocampo
2. Don Pablo Ramos
3. Don Santiago Cudal

American Period to Contemporary Period:

1. Don Alfonso Faigal (1865-1868)
2. Don Gines Ongjiangco (1869-1872)
3. Don Juan Sarmiento (1873-1876)
4. Don Saturnino Santiago (1877-1880)
5. Don Pablo Medina (1881-1884)
6. Don Cenon Rico (1885-1888)
7. Don Andres Afan Salvador (1889-1891)
8. Don Martin Bagain (1892-1895)
9. Don Esteban Dubal (1896-1899)
10. Don Luis De Ocampo (1900-1903)
11. Don Pablo Ramos (1910-1912)
12. Don Santiago Cudal (1912-1916)
13. Don Simon Sawit (1916-1919)
14. Don Eusebio Tabaquin (1921-1922)
15. Don Felix Ramento (1922-1925)
16. Don Agustin Vigilia (1925-1928)
17. Don Alfonso Faigal (1928-1937)
18. Don Juan Villamar (1941-1943)
19. Don Pedro Corpus (1943-1945)
20. Don Anacleto Ramos (1945-1948)
21. Gil Dizon (1948-1952)
22. Arsenio Padre (1953-1955)
23. Virgilio Calica (1956-1957)
24. Inocencio Garampil (1964-1967)
25. Severino Bernardino (1968-1980)
26. Virgilio Calica (1981-1983)
27. Anastacio Ortiz (1983-1984)
28. Jose Dizon (1988-1992)
29. Cesar V. Cucio (1992-1995)
30. Nestor Bernardino (1995-1998)
31. Jose Lucius Pocholo Dizon (1998-2007)
32. Jose Francis Stevens Dizon (2007–2016)
33. Jose Dizon (2016-2023)

== Culture ==
=== Intangible Cultural Heritage ===
The Ragragsak ti Guimba is the annual festival of Guimba. It is composed of various events that begins at February and ends at March, preparations normally start at January. The highlights include opening Mass, Ms. Guimba, basketball competitions, Ms. Gay, Mr. Teen, band, and street dancing which is the most popular.

The town formerly was known for its potteries, which were introduced by its first settlers from the Ilocos region. However, the tradition vanished sometime before or after the Philippine Revolution.

The town also possessed a rice-pounding tradition during full moons, however, the tradition vanished during the martial law period in the 1980s.

=== Tangible Cultural Heritage ===
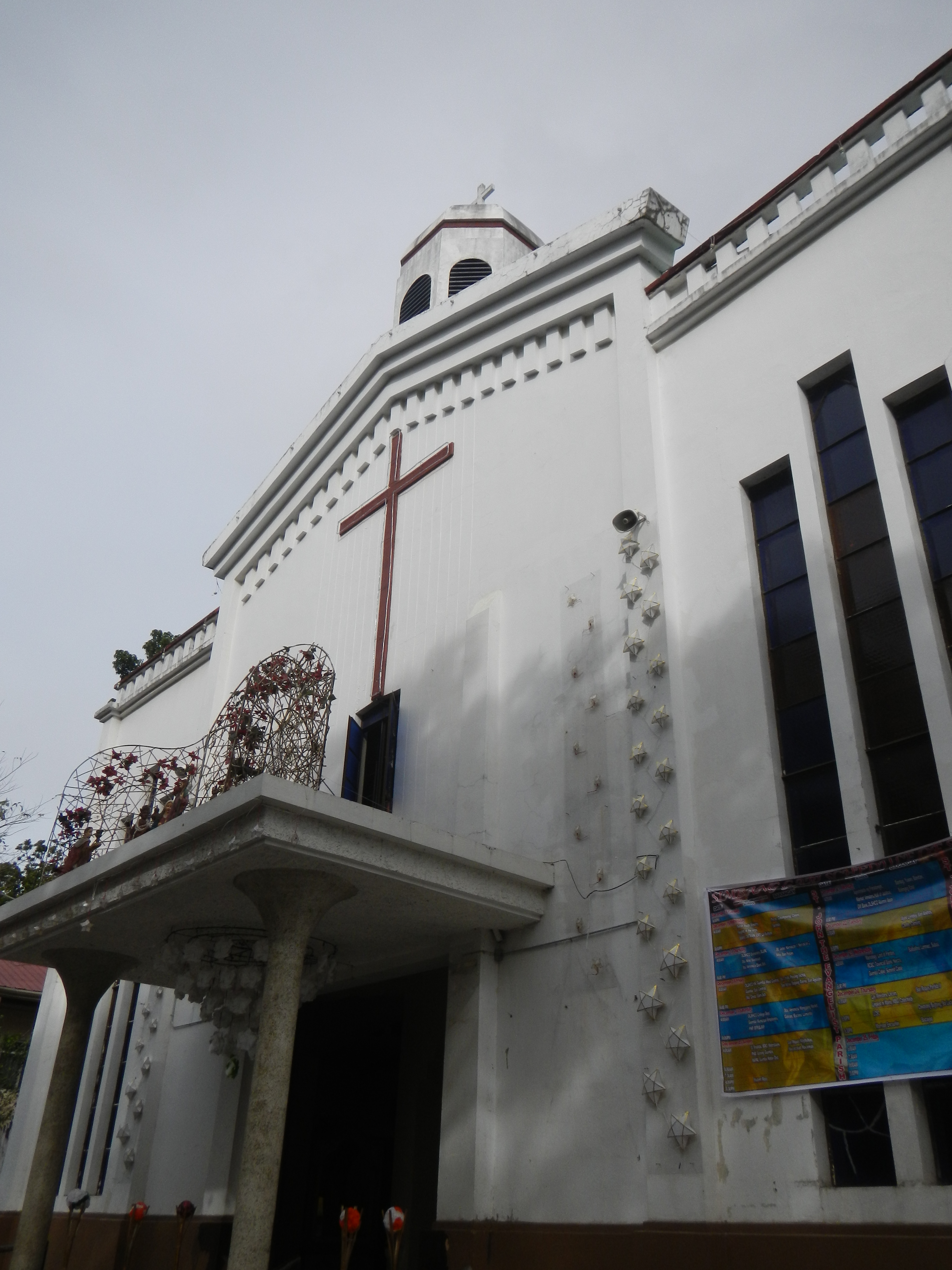
Façade of Guimba Church

In accordance to Article V Section 4 of the National Heritage Act of 2009 Republic Act 10066, the Philippine Registry of Cultural Property (PRECUP), the repository of all information pertaining to cultural properties in the Philippines deemed significant to Filipino cultural heritage, was established and came to effect last 2009.

Aside from cultural agencies of the government, the law also mandates the Cultural Office of the LGU to establish a "Local Important Cultural Properties List and Documents" as declared by the Sanggunian. These are cultural properties which are significant to local culture and history of Guimba.

Among the ways to register a cultural property in the PRECUP are: (1) Local government units, through their cultural offices, shall likewise maintain an inventory of cultural property under its jurisdiction and shall furnish the commission a copy of the same; and (2) Private collectors and owners shall register their cultural property to the National Museum. Registered cultural properties shall remain in the possession of their private owners.

A building, monuments, or zone aged 50 and above is considered a 'heritage structure.' Archives, books, and works of art with high significance to local culture and history is considered a 'heritage object.' All of which can be registered in the PRECUP.

The Municipality of Guimba, as of 2017, has yet to submit any cultural property to the PRECUP.

The cultural properties of Guimba that may be submitted for registration in the PRECUP includes:

- St. John the Evangelist Parish Church, known also as Guimba Church - known for its intricate depiction of the mysteries of Christ at its two aisles, its huge altar painting depicting heaven and earth ruled by God, and its ceiling painting which depict rice stalks, the town's main product
- Old Municipal Building - established during the American period and has been the former seat of power of the municipality
- Ruins of the Philippine National Railway Station in Guimba - which is one of the few connective rail stations in Nueva Ecija
- World War 2 Monument - built to honor the American and Filipino fighters in which they liberated the town from the Japanese in 1942
- Triala's Mansion - formerly owned by Nueva Ecija's revolutionary leader, General Manuel Tinio
- Faigal Bridge and other Spanish and American period bridges within the municipality
- Historic Guimba Public Cemetery
- Various Spanish and American Era Ancestral Houses - many need urgent conservation as many houses have been demolished already in favor of non-traditional cement buildings
- Various barangay landmark sculptures like those in Pasong Inchik's intersection road
- Various artifacts and books in Guimba's heritage centers
- Our Lady of the Sacred Heart College of Guimba campus - one of the oldest educational institution in the town
- Bartolome Sangalang National High School - possesses the Gabaldon architectural style, a unique architectural style of the Philippines but the buildings are mostly abandoned and largely unused.

=== Environmental Heritage ===
Prior to Spanish arrival, the entire town of Guimba was completely covered with rainforests. Philippine deer, Luzon warty pig, bleeding heart doves, and Philippine eagles were present as locals or passerby species. In the American period, agriculture was increased and the forest cover began to deplete. By the end of the 21st century, all big aves and wild mammals went extinct, while the forest cover was calculated to be less than 5% of its original extent.

== Infrastructure ==
- Roads total length:
  - National roads - 41.76 km (25.95 mi)
  - Provincial roads - 44.70 km (27.78 mi)
  - Municipal - 15.60 km (9.69 mi)
  - Barangay - 153.72 km (95.52 mi)

More than half of Guimba's energy is taken from hydro power plants, making it a sustainable town.

Its communications is mainly handled by Digitel, while Globe, Touch Mobile, Dito, and Smart are the predominant cellphone services used.

== Healthcare ==
- Guimba District Hospital - Brgy. Pacac, Guimba, Nueva Ecija
- Guimba General Hospital, Inc. - Bagain St. Santa Veronica District, Guimba, Nueva Ecija
- Guimba Community Hospital (Guimba Meternity & Lying-in Clinic) - Saranay District, Guimba Nueva Ecija
- Other clinics and Brgy. health centers served the populace around the Municipality of Guimba.

== Education ==
There are two schools district offices which govern all educational institutions within the municipality. They oversee the management and operations of all private and public, from primary to secondary schools. These are the Guimba East School District Office, and Guimba West Schools District Office.

Education in Guimba is taught by various educational institutions in the municipality which offer mostly Information Technology, Hotel and Restaurant Management, and Teacher Education. Other courses are subsidized by Nueva Ecija's only state university, Central Luzon State University, located in the municipality of Munoz and other colleges in Cabanatuan, the province' regional economic center. Guimba has a literacy rate of 97%.

=== Primary and elementary schools ===
- Bacayao Elementary School
- Bagong Barrio Elementary School
- Balingog East Elementary School
- Balingog West Elementary School
- Banitan Elementary School
- Bantug Elementary School
- Bertese Elementary School
- Bonifacio Luz Natividad Educational Foundation Incorporated (BLUN)*
- Bunol Integrated School
- Caballero Elementary School
- Cabaruan Elementary School
- Calem Elementary School
- Camiing Elementary School
- Casongsong Elementary School
- Catimon Elementary School
- Cavite Elementary School
- Cawayang Bugtong Elementary School
- Consuelo Elementary School
- Culong Elementary School
- Don Pedro D. Corpus Elementary School
- Escaño Primary School
- Essential Academy
- Faigal Elementary School
- Galvan Elementary School
- Guimba East Central School
- Guimba United Methodist Church Learning Center
- Guimba West Central School
- Guiset Elementary School
- Lamorito Elementary School
- Lennec Elementary School
- Macacatuit Elementary School
- Macamias Elementary School
- Manacsac Elementary School
- Manggang Marikit Elementary School
- Maturanoc Elementary School
- Naglabrahan Elementary School
- Nagpandayan Elementary School
- Narvacan I Elementary School
- Narvacan II Elementary School
- Pacac Elementary School
- Partida I Elementary School
- Pasong Inchik-San Rafael Elementary School
- Partida II Elementary School
- San Agustin Elementary School
- San Andres Elementary School
- San Bernardino Integrated School
- San Marcelino Elementary School
- San Miguel Elementary School
- San Roque Elementary School
- Sinulatan Elementary School
- St. Lawrence Montessori
- Sta. Ana Elementary School
- Sta. Cruz Elementary School
- Sta. Veronica Elementary School
- Sto. Cristo Elementary School
- Sto. Nino Starbright Montessori School
- Subul Elementary School
- Triala Elementary School
- Yuson Elementary School

=== Secondary schools ===
- Bartolome Sangalang National High School
- Galvan National High School
- Macatcatuit National High School
- Manacsac High School
- Maybubon Integrated School
- Nagpandayan National High School
- Pacac High School
- San Andres High School
- San Bernardino Integrated School
- Triala National High School

*BLUN is also a secondary school

=== Technical and Tertiary school ===
- First Magcor School of Technology
- Our Lady of the Sacred Heart College Inc. (OLSHCO)
- World Citi College (WCC)
- CATMAN
- CRT
