= Cities Service =

American petroleum company (1910–1988)

- Industry: Public utility Petroleum
- Founded: September 2, 1910
- Defunct: December 31, 1988
- Fate: Acquired by Occidental Petroleum in 1982, reorganized in 1988
- Successor: Oxy USA Inc. (1988–present)
- Headquarters: New York City (1910–1974); Tulsa (1974–1988)

The Cities Service Company was an American public utility and integrated petroleum company that existed from 1910 to 1988. Cities was formed by Henry Latham Doherty as a holding company for three public utilities he owned. Within the company's first five years, it had around 170 utilities under its control and had begun to explore for oil and natural gas. Cities was a major petroleum producer during World War I and played a significant part in America's war effort.

During World War II, Cities served again as a major producer in support of the Allied war effort and its executives were instrumental in the construction of the Big Inch pipeline. After the passage of the Public Utility Holding Company Act of 1935, Cities was obligated to dispose of its utility operations. It began this process in 1941 and sold off its last utility in 1954, thus becoming exclusively an oil and gas company. In 1965, Cities devised the Citgo brand for its retail operations. By the early 1980s, Cities was the country's 19th largest oil company.

In 1981, Cities fended off a hostile takeover attempt by T. Boone Pickens. The following year, a possible merger with Gulf Oil fell through. In late 1982, Cities was acquired outright by Occidental Petroleum, whose reserves at the time were almost entirely outside the States. In the summer of 1983, Occidental spun off Cities' downstream assets to Southland Corporation as the Citgo Petroleum Corporation. Cities continued as a wholly-owned subsidiary of Occidental after the takeover and formed the basis of Occidental's domestic operations. In April 1988, its name was changed to Oxy Oil & Gas USA, and then on December 31, 1988, it merged into its subsidiary, Oxy USA Inc.

== History ==
=== Pre-history ===
The story of Cities Service began in 1882, when Henry Latham Doherty, age 12, left school and took a job with the Columbus Gas Company as an office boy. Doherty worked his way up through the company ranks and taught himself engineering. In 1896, he was hired by Emerson McMillin to become the manager of the Madison Gas & Electric Company in Madison, Wisconsin. The company he was charged with running sold electricity and manufactured gas and was running inefficiently. In his new role, Doherty reorganized the company's operations and set out on an aggressive sales program that saw the company sell gas stoves to nearly half the families in the city. Additionally, he began selling electricity for street lighting and various other illuminations purposes.

Based on the success in Madison, McMillin summoned Doherty to New York and placed the latter in control of all the McMillin gas and electrical utilities. Doherty then organized the American Light & Traction Company, which served as a holding company for all of the banker's utility interests. Over the ensuing years, Doherty travelled the continent to reorganize companies owned by McMillin. In Denver, he set up one of the country's first industrial training schools to provide practical experience for new engineers upon graduation.

In 1905, Doherty went into business independently when he acquired control of the Denver Gas & Electric Company. That same year, he set up offices in New York City for his personal company, Henry L. Doherty & Company.

=== Early years ===
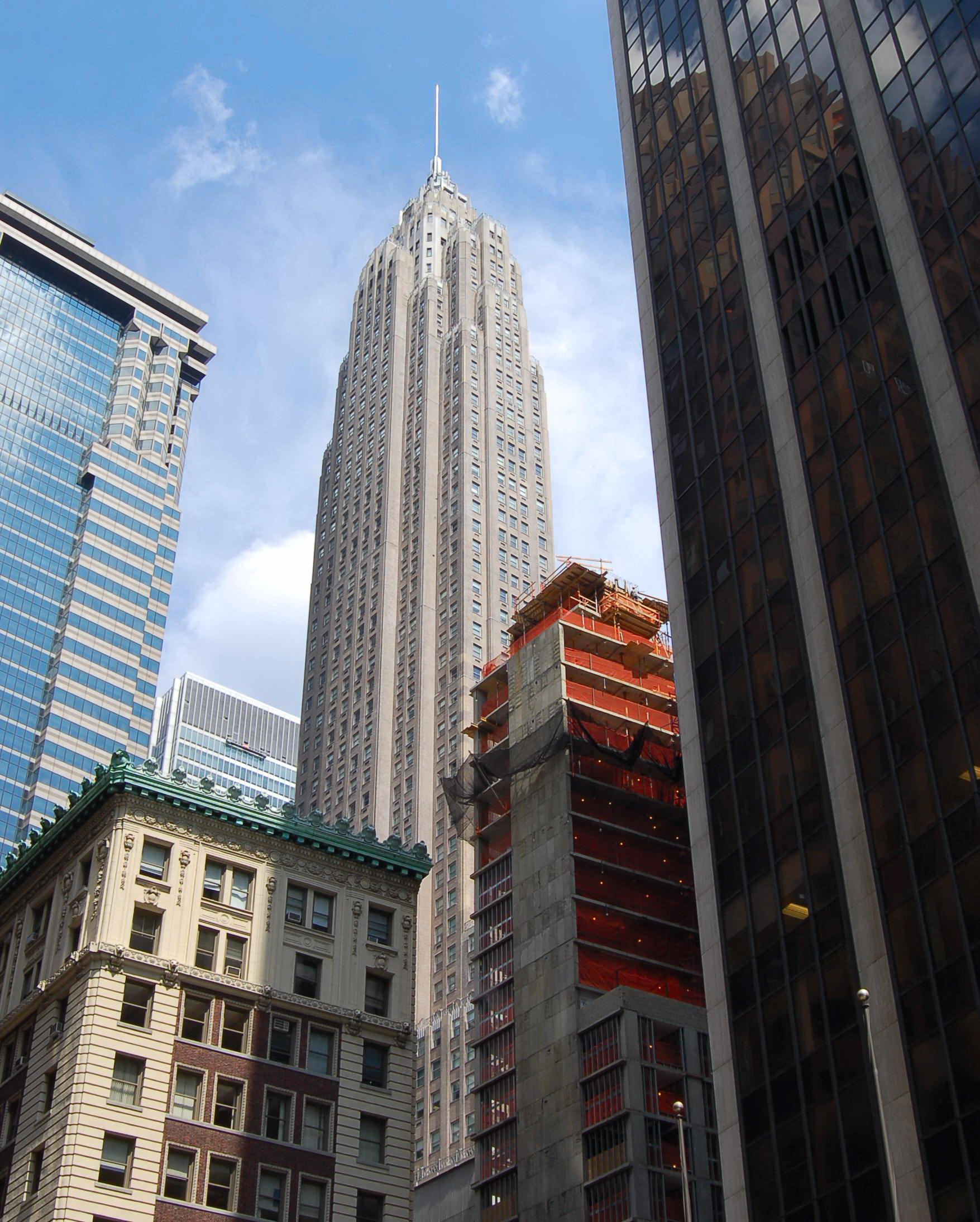
From 1932 to 1974 the company was headquartered in the Cities Service Building in Lower Manhattan.

On September 2, 1910, Doherty incorporated the Cities Service Company as a Delaware corporation. The new company served as a holding company for three operating concerns: The Denver Gas & Electric Company, the Spokane Gas & Fuel Company, and the Empire District Electric Company. Following the establishment of Cities, the company set out on an acquisitions spree. In 1913 the company purchased 53 utilities, and by the end of that year had 170 companies under its control.

In the early years of the company, Doherty had developed an interest in natural gas as a complement to manufactured gas. Consequently, the company began acquiring producing properties in the Texas panhandle. The company made a major oil discovery in August, Kansas in 1914. In October 1915, a subsidiary called the Wichita Natural Gas Company discovered a major oil field in El Dorado, Kansas. During World War I, the El Dorado field was producing more oil than Germany's fields in Romania and Galicia combined and played a major role in fueling British convoys. By 1918, Cities had seven refineries in operation. Additionally, its gas utilities serviced 464,000 people annually, its electric utilities 144,000 people annually, and its traction companies served 116 million passengers each year.

In 1919, Doherty helped to establish the American Petroleum Institute. Doherty was a critic of waste in oil and gas production and petitioned the federal government to intervene to protect what he saw as a national asset. Based on Doherty's recommendations, in 1924 president Calvin Coolidge established the Federal Oil Conservation Board to monitor industry conditions. Doherty developed a conservation proposal called "unit operation," which was adopted by the API on December 11, 1927. During the depression, Cities was able to remain stable in spite of low oil prices due to the income from its utilities.

After a prolonged illness, founder and president Henry Doherty died on December 26, 1939 at age 69. On January 4, 1940, executive vice-president W. Alton Jones (1891–1962) was appointed Doherty's successor as president. Jones had begun his career with the Empire District Electric Company, and in 1921 moved to New York to become assistant to Frank Wheatcroft Frueauff (1874–1922), who was acting head of Cities Service. In 1922 Jones was elected a director of Cities, in 1925 became chairman of the executive committee of Henry L. Doherty & Co., and in 1927 became the first vice-president of Cities.

On May 20, 1953, Jones was elected the first chairman of the board of Cities. Succeeding him as president was Burl Stevens Watson Sr. (1893–1975). Watson had joined Cities in 1917 as a cadet engineer after graduating from the University of Alabama.

On June 25, 1959, Watson succeeded Jones as chairman of the board and chief executive. Replacing Watson as president was John Edwin Warren (1901–1988). Warren had left his post as senior vice-president of the First National City Bank of New York in November 1958 to become a director and chairman of the executive committee of Cities. Jones remained on the board and succeeded Warren as chairman of the executive committee.

On March 1, 1962, Jones, who was chairman of the executive committee still, was killed in the crash of American Airlines Flight 1. Jones had been on his way to California to meet president Dwight D. Eisenhower, whence the two men would travel to Mexico for a fishing trip. The funeral was held on March 5 at St. James' Episcopal Church and was attended by Eisenhower, numerous government officials, and the presidents of almost all banks and oil companies based in New York.

In June 1965, Cities announced that chairman Watson and president Warren would both leave their posts at the end of the year; Warren would retire while Watson would remain a director and chairman of the executive committee. The new chairman and chief executive would be John Lawrence Burns (1908–1996), while the new president would be Charles Scott Mitchell (1909–1972). Burns was a management consultant who had served from 1957 to 1961 as president of RCA, and also was chairman of Rawlings. Mitchell had joined Cities in 1930 after graduating with an engineering degree from North Carolina State University. At the time of his appointment, he was an executive vice-president.

On Sunday, February 11, 1968, Burns announced that he was stepping down as chairman. Burns informed the board he had completed the task for which he was hired, which was to reorganize the company's administrative and managerial procedures, and which to return to private endeavors. Mitchell was elected as the new chairman and chief executive, while John Edgar Heston (1910–1972), then president of the Cities Service Oil Company, was appointed president. Both appointments became effective on February 12.

President Heston requested early retirement on October 1, 1971 due to health concerns. Heston died in Tulsa on April 12, 1972 at age 61. His successor was Charles Jacob Waidelich (1929–2019), who was executive vice-president for operations. Not long after the change of president, on January 5, 1972, chairman Mitchell died unexpectedly at age 62. On January 10, the company elected Robert Vernon Sellers (1927–1989) as his replacement. Sellers was the company's vice-president of finance and had been vice-chairman since the previous October.

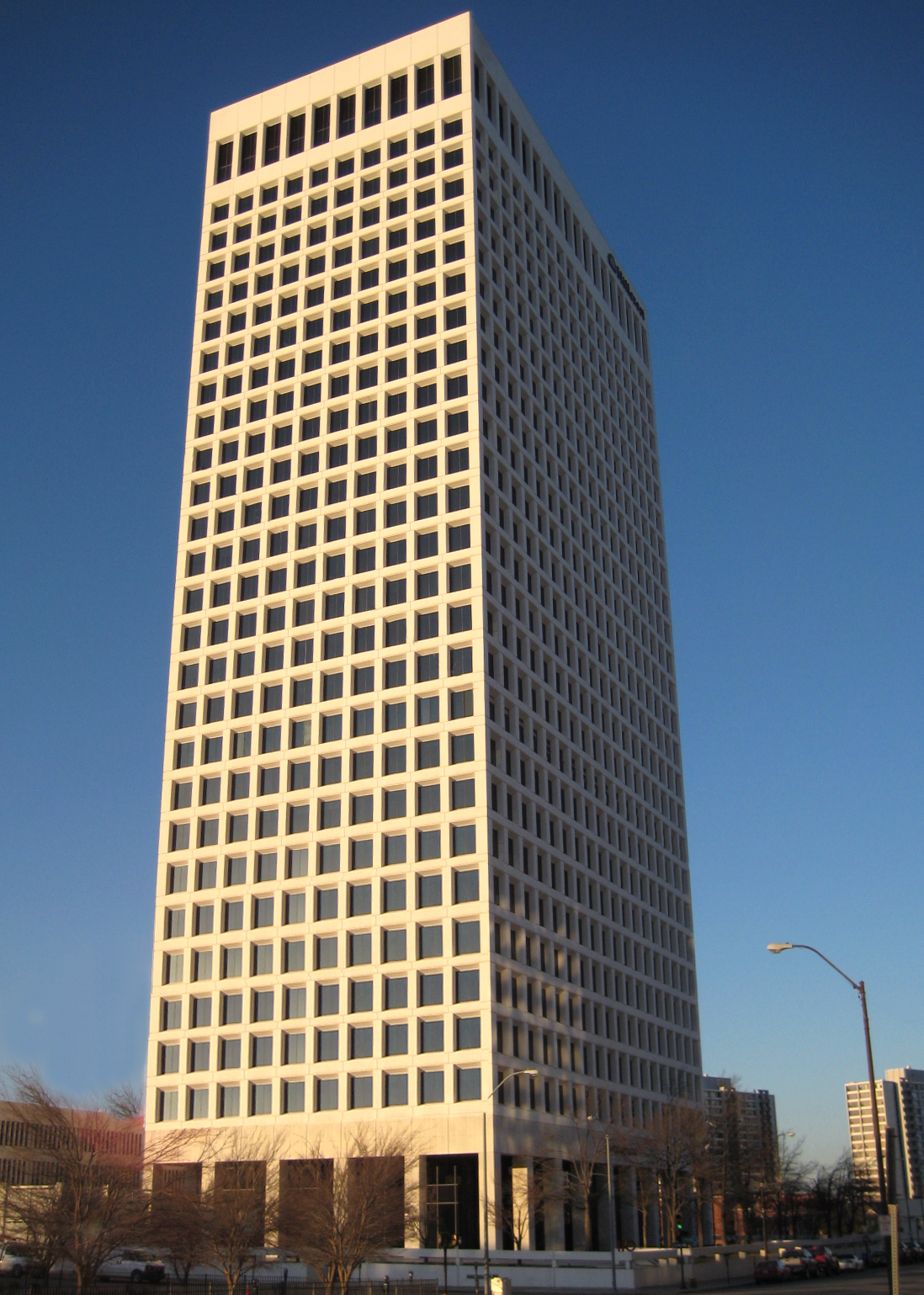
The company's headquarters moved in 1974 from New York to the Cities Service Building in Tulsa.

On November 28, 1973, Cities announced that it would be transferring its headquarters from Manhattan to Tulsa the following summer. The move was designed to improve operational efficiency and cut costs. While the company had been considering the move for a while, the decision was hastened by the 1973 oil crisis. At the time, six of the company's 12 operating divisions were in Oklahoma, with five of those headquartered in Tulsa. There would be 250 people involved in the move. Along with the move, the company announced it was selling 70 Pine Street, seven other office buildings in the financial district (52, 54, 56, 60, 64, and 68 Wall Street and 69 Pine Street), and buildings in Fort Wayne and Atlanta. In the fall of 1974, Cities demolished the row of buildings on Wall Street it owned to make the property more appealing to sell. The properties would become the site of the new 60 Wall Street.

Cities assumed its Tulsa headquarters in the Cities Service Building that had opened in November 1971. The building had been planned in 1968 and was a joint project with contractor Henry C. Beck Co. of Dallas and developer Noah Oscar Thomas Jr. of Shreveport. Upon its completion, the building served as the headquarters of the Cities Service Oil & Gas Company, an operating subsidiary of the parent company.

In November 1980, Waidelich assumed the title of chief executive from Sellers, who continued as chairman.

Sellers retired at the end of 1981 and was succeeded as chairman by Waidelich. Robert Hodson Chitwood (1930–2009) was selected as the new president. Chitwood had joined Cities in 1952, became a vice-president in 1970, became president of the Cities Service Gas Company in 1974, and an executive vice-president of the parent company in 1976.

=== Takeover ===
To execute the acquisition, Occidental formed the Occidental Merger Corporation, which was incorporated in Delaware on September 23, 1982.

On March 14, 1983, Occidental incorporated a new Cities Service Company in Delaware. The new Cities took over the assets of the original Cities that had been acquired by the temporary Occidental Merger Corporation. Concurrently, Cities formed a new subsidiary, the Cities Service Oil & Gas Corporation.

In March of 1983, Occidental came to an agreement with Southland Corp to sell Cities' downstream assets. Consequently, on March 18, 1983, a new subsidiary called Cities Service RMT Corporation was set up and assigned the company's refining, marketing, and transportation assets. On August 30, 1983, Southland shareholders approved the purchase, which cost $986.5 million in shares and stock. After Southland acquired Cities Service RMT, the company's name was changed to the Citgo Petroleum Corporation, which it remains today.

The new Cities Service Company continued to operate as a domestic subsidiary of Occidental. On September 2, 1983, president Chitwood resigned from his post and was replaced by David Allen Hentschel (1934–). Concurrently, the company announced that Waidelich would resign as chairman on November 1 and that Hentschel would assume this post as well. Henschel, a petroleum engineer who was 49 at the time and had spent his whole career with Cities, was chosen instead of an Occidental veteran for the job. His knowledge of the company would allow him to help integrate its operations into Occidental.

On April 1, 1988, the Cities Service Company changed its name to Oxy Oil & Gas USA Inc., while Cities Service Oil & Gas was renamed Oxy USA Inc. On December 31, 1988, Oxy Oil & Gas USA merged into Oxy USA, which remains in existence today.

== Leadership ==
=== President ===
1. Henry Latham Doherty, September 2, 1910 – December 26, 1939 †
2. William Alton Jones, January 4, 1940 – May 20, 1953
3. Burl Stevens Watson Sr., May 20, 1953 – June 25, 1959
4. John Edwin Warren, June 25, 1959 – December 31, 1965
5. Charles Scott Mitchell, January 1, 1966 – February 14, 1968
6. John Edgar Heston, February 14, 1968 – October 1, 1971
7. Charles Jacob Waidelich, October 1, 1971 – December 31, 1981
8. Robert Hodson Chitwood, January 1, 1982 – September 2, 1983
9. David Allen Hentschel, September 2, 1983 – December 31, 1988

=== Chairmen of the board ===
1. William Alton Jones, May 20, 1953 – Jun 25, 1959
2. Burl Stevens Watson Sr., June 25, 1959 – December 31, 1965
3. John Lawrence Burns, January 1, 1966 – February 12, 1968
4. Charles Scott Mitchell, February 12, 1968 – January 5, 1972 †
5. Robert Vernon Sellers, January 10, 1972 – December 31, 1981
6. Charles Jacob Waidelich, January 1, 1982 – November 1, 1983
7. David Allen Hentschel, November 1, 1983 – December 31, 1988
