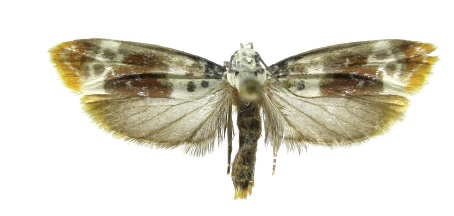

Scientific classification
- Domain: Eukaryota
- Kingdom: Animalia
- Phylum: Arthropoda
- Class: Insecta
- Order: Lepidoptera
- Family: Depressariidae
- Genus: Ethmia
- Species: E. dianemillerae

Binomial name
- Ethmia dianemillerae Phillips, 2014

= Ethmia dianemillerae =

Species of moth

Ethmia dianemillerae is a moth in the family Depressariidae. It is found in Costa Rica, where it has been recorded at middle elevations on the Caribbean slope of Cordillera Volcánica de Guanacaste, Cordillera Volcánica Central and in the lowlands of the northern Caribbean. The habitat consists of rain forests.

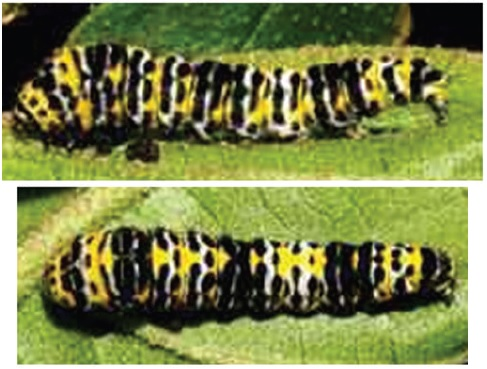
Larva

The length of the forewings is about 10.3 mm (0.41 in) for males and 11.5–12.5 mm (0.45–0.49 in) for females. The ground color of the forewings is white with several dark spots in the costal half, two dark spots of similar size at the base of the posterior half, as well as a light brown band from the base of the costa. The base of the costa is dark, split by a white spot and there is a large reddish spot surrounded by brown from the grey costal band to the posterior margin. The termen is reddish, golden apically to above the termen and there are two large spots in the white subterminal area. The hindwing ground colour is brownish with an ochreus termen.

The larvae feed on Cordia alliodora.

== Etymology ==
The species is named in honor of Diane Edgerton Miller, for her steering of the Blue Moon Fund in the footsteps of the W. Alton Jones Foundation.
