= Citgo =

American oil company and gasoline retailer

Citgo Petroleum Corporation
- Type: Private
- Industry: Oil and gasoline
- Founded: March 18, 1983
- Headquarters: Houston, Texas, U.S.
- Products: Fuels, lubricants and petrochemicals
- Revenue: US$24.113 billion (2021)
- Net income: US$305 million (2024)
- Owner: Petróleos de Venezuela, S.A.
- Number of employees: 3,400 (2020)
- Website: www.citgo.com

Citgo Petroleum Corporation, or Citgo (stylized as CITGO), is a U.S.-based downstream petroleum company formed in 1983 as a spinoff of the retail, marketing, and transportation assets of Cities Service, which had been acquired by Occidental Petroleum the year before. Headquartered in the Energy Corridor area of Houston, it is majority-owned by PDVSA, a state-owned company of the Venezuelan government (although due to U.S. sanctions in 2019, Citgo no longer provides payments or services to PDVSA).

== History ==
=== Cities Service period ===
The company traces its heritage back to the early 1900s and oil entrepreneur Henry Latham Doherty. After quickly climbing the ladder of success in the manufactured gas and electric utility world, Doherty in 1910 created Cities Service Gas Development Company, a West Virginia corporation, to supply gas and electricity to small public utilities. He began by acquiring gas-producing properties in the mid-continent and southwest.

The company then developed a pipeline system, tapping dozens of gas pools. To make this gas available to consumers, Doherty moved to acquire distributing companies and tied them into a common source of supply. Cities Service became the first company in the mid-continent to use the slack demand period of summer to refill depleted fields near its market areas. Thus, gas could be conveniently and inexpensively withdrawn during peak demand times. In 1931, Cities Service completed the Natural Gas Pipeline Company of America, the nation's first long-distance high-pressure natural gas transportation system, a 24-inch pipeline 1,000 miles long from Amarillo, Texas, to Chicago.

A logical step in the company's program for finding and developing supplies of natural gas was its entry into the oil business. This move was marked by major discoveries at Augusta, Kansas, in 1914, and in El Dorado, Kansas in the Mid-Continent oil province a year later. In 1928, a Cities Service subsidiary, Indian Territory Illuminating Oil Company, discovered the Oklahoma City Oil Field, one of the world's largest. Another participated in the discovery of the East Texas Oil Field, which, in its time, was the most sensational on the globe.

Over three decades, the company sponsored the Cities Service Concerts on NBC radio. The long run of these musical broadcasts was heard on NBC from 1925 to 1956, encompassing a variety of vocalists and musicians. In 1944, it was retitled Highways in Melody, and later the series was known as The Cities Service Band of America. In 1964, the company moved its headquarters from Bartlesville, Oklahoma, to Tulsa.

At the height of Cities Service's growth, Congress passed the Public Utility Holding Company Act of 1935, which forced the company to divest itself of either its utility operations or its oil and gas holdings. Cities Service elected to remain in the petroleum business. The first steps to liquidate investments in its public utilities were taken in 1943 and affected over 250 different utility corporations.

At the same time, the government was nearing completion of a major refinery at Rose Bluff just outside Lake Charles, Louisiana, which would become the foundation of the company's manufacturing operation. Using designs developed by Cities Service and the Kellogg Co., the plant was dedicated only 18 months after groundbreaking. A month before Allied troops landed in France, it was turning out enough 100-octane aviation gasoline to fuel 1,000 daily bomber sorties from England to Germany. Government funding through the Defense Plant Corporation (DPC) also prompted Cities Service to build plants to manufacture butadiene, used to make synthetic rubber, and toluene, a fuel octane booster and solvent.

In the years that followed, Cities Service grew into a full oil and gas company with global operations. Its green, expanding circle marketing logo became a familiar sight across much of the nation. During this time CEOs such as W. Alton Jones and Burl S. Watson ran the company.

Cities Service Company inaugurated use of the Citgo brand in 1965 (officially styled "CITGO") for its refining, marketing and retail petroleum businesses (which became known internally as the RMT Division, for Refining, Marketing and Transportation). CITGO continued to be only a trademark, and not a company name, until the 1983 sale of what had been the RMT Division of Cities Service to Southland Corporation (now 7-Eleven Inc.).

=== Demise of Cities Service and birth of Citgo Petroleum Corporation ===
In 1982, T. Boone Pickens, founder of Mesa Petroleum, offered to buy Cities Service Company. Citgo responded by offering to buy Mesa, which was the first use of what became known as the Pac-Man take-over defense; i.e., a counter-tender offer initiated by a takeover target. Cities Service also threatened to dissolve itself by incremental sales rather than being taken over by Mesa, stating that it believed that the pieces would sell for more than Pickens was offering for the whole. Cities Service Company located what they thought would be a "white knight" to give them a better deal and entered into a merger agreement with Gulf Oil Corporation. Late in the summer of 1982, Gulf Oil terminated the merger agreement claiming that Cities Service's reserve estimates were over-stated. Over fifteen years of litigation resulted. Ironically, two years later, Gulf Oil itself would collapse as a result of a Pickens-initiated takeover attempt.

In the chaos that ensued after Gulf Oil's termination of its deal, Cities Service eventually entered into a merger agreement with, and was acquired by, Occidental Petroleum Corporation—a deal that was closed in the fall of 1982. That same year, Cities Service Company transferred all of the assets of its Refining, Marketing and Transportation division (which comprised its refining and retail petroleum business) into the newly formed Citgo Petroleum Corporation subsidiary, to ease the divestiture of the division, which Occidental had no interest in retaining. Pursuant to an agreement entered into in 1982, Citgo and the Citgo and Cities Service brands were sold by Occidental in 1983 to Southland Corporation, original owners of the 7-Eleven chain of convenience stores.

=== Venezuelan ownership ===
Fifty percent of Citgo was sold to Petróleos de Venezuela, S.A. (PDVSA) in 1986, which acquired the remainder in 1990, resulting in the current ownership structure. In September 2010, in connection with the centennial of its original owner, Cities Service Company, Citgo unveiled a new retail design. Within five years, Citgo planned for all locations to display the new street image. With full ownership of Citgo, PDVSA at its peak controlled 10% of the US domestic oil market, creating a lucrative export chain from Venezuelan oil to American consumers, as the two largest buyers of Venezuelan petroleum are the United States and China, respectively.

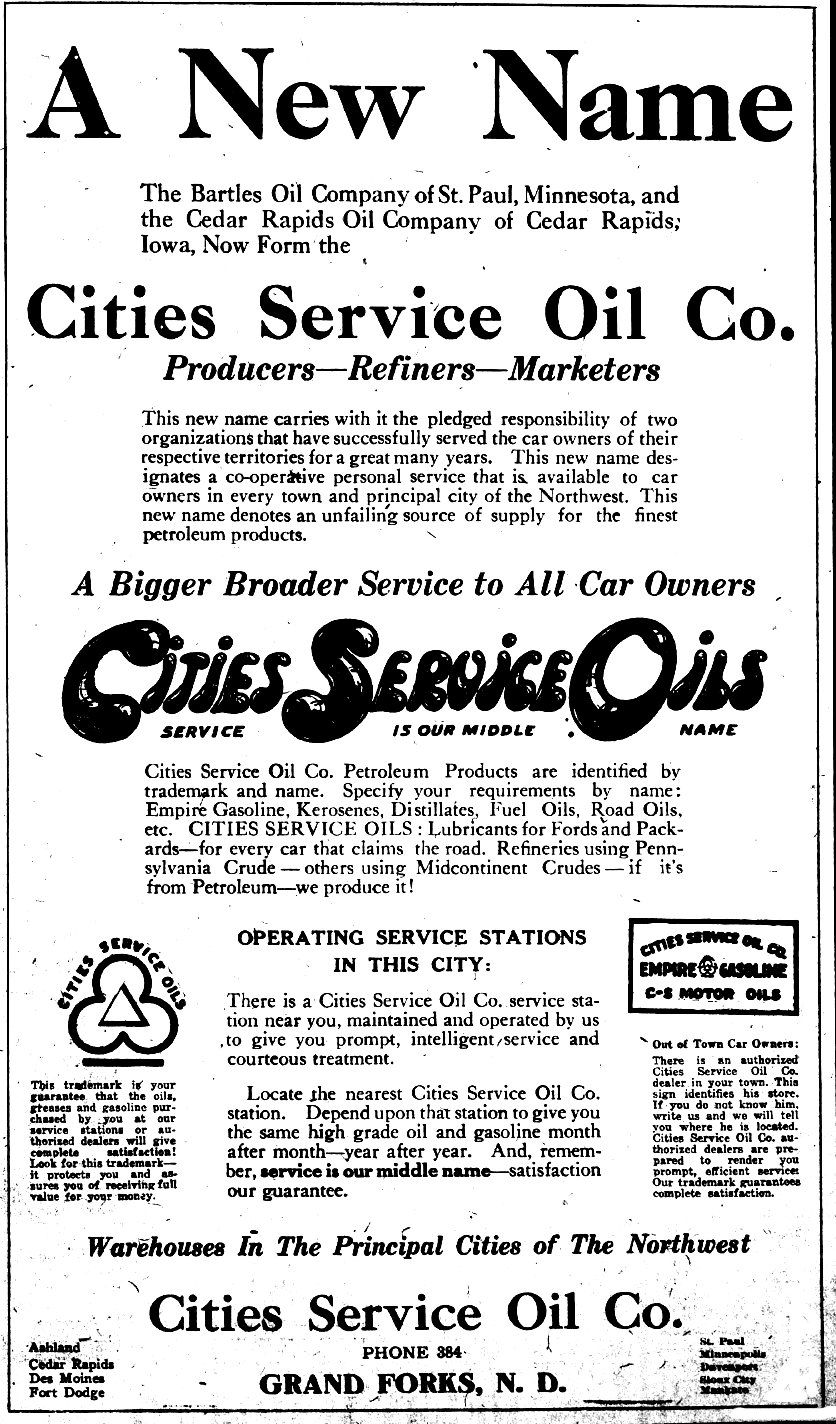
1922 newspaper ad promoting the new Cities Service Oils.

In October 2010, then President of Venezuela, Hugo Chávez, announced the intention to have PDVSA sell its Citgo subsidiary calling it a "bad business" and citing low profits since 2006. The minimum sale price was set at 10 billion US dollars; however, PDVSA has been unable to find a buyer at that price. It was confirmed in January 2015 that Citgo would not be sold, but rather bonds were sold by Citgo to give a dividend to PDVSA. The Bonds sold included a $1.5bn five-year bond and a $1.3bn term loan to be fully repaid in three and a half years.

In a 2016 deal, Venezuela pledged 49.9% of Citgo to Russian oil firm Rosneft as collateral for a $1.5 billion loan. Both Republicans and Democrats in the United States urged oversight on this deal, describing Citgo's sale to Russia as a risk to the national security of the United States.

In November 2017, six executives working for Citgo, the Citgo Six, including five American citizens, were arrested while attending a meeting at the headquarters of PDVSA in Caracas, and as of June 2020 remained imprisoned without consular access and without a trial. Although granted house arrest in Venezuela in December 2019, the six men were transferred to harsher conditions in El Helicoide prison following U.S. President Donald Trump's hosting of opposition leader Juan Guaido at the 2020 State of the Union Address.

Amid the COVID-19 pandemic, U.S. Secretary of State Mike Pompeo called for their release on humanitarian grounds, stating that they were "wrongfully detained" and that they had been incarcerated without evidence presented against them for over two years. On March 9, 2022, one of the Citgo Six was released following a visit by US officials, including US Ambassador to Venezuela James B. Story, to Venezuela, where they met with Venezuelan President Nicolás Maduro. Later that year, on October 1, the remaining five members of the Citgo Six were released following a prisoner exchange.

Other Venezuelan oil executives were arrested in what Bloomberg News described as a "purge" designed to bolster more economic power behind the President of Venezuela, Nicolás Maduro. Asdrúbal Chávez, cousin of late Venezuelan president Hugo Chávez, was chosen as president of Citgo in November 2017.

Citgo also has a much earlier connection to Venezuela, dating to the turn of the 20th century. Predecessor Warner-Quinley Asphalt's principal business was competition to the "Asphalt Trust" by means of a bitumen resources concession it held in Venezuela.

==== Crisis in Venezuela ====
Following the death of Hugo Chávez in 2013, his successor Nicolás Maduro presided in office through an era of economic depression caused by decreasing oil prices and sanctions. The destabilized economy resulted in hyperinflation, an economic depression, shortages in Venezuela and drastic increases in poverty, disease, child mortality, malnutrition, and crime. As a result of the crisis, Venezuela's debt to China and Russia – two political allies – increased. Due to the financial burden of this debt, Venezuela offered Citgo as collateral for Russian debt in 2016, raising the possibility that the Russian government could own Citgo due to Venezuela's high risk of default.

In July 2018, Citgo president Asdrúbal Chávez had his work and tourist visas revoked by the United States and was ordered to leave the country within thirty days.

=== 2019 U.S. sanctions and transfer to Guaidó opposition ===
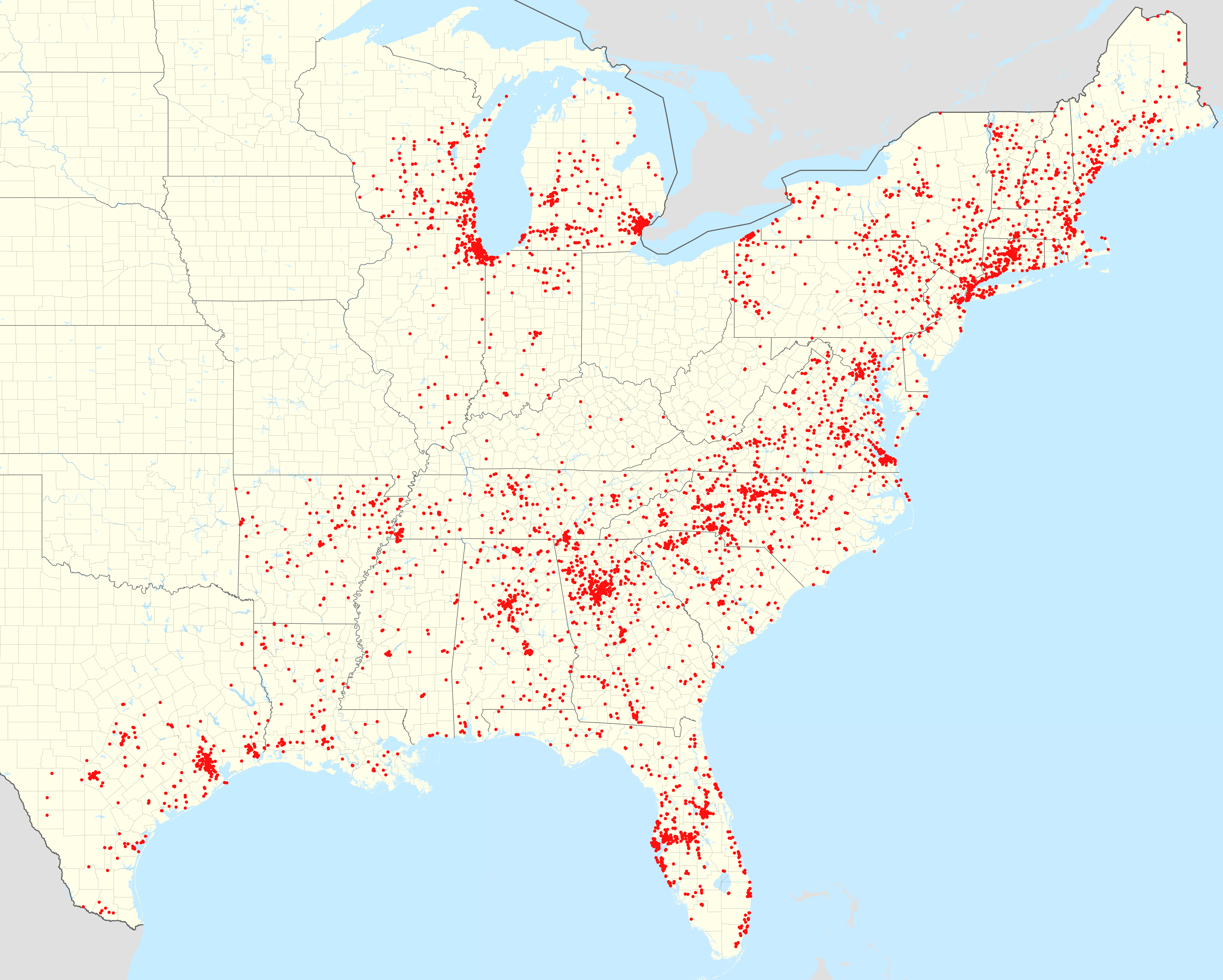
CITGO branded stations map as of September 2020.

On January 23, 2019, following the rejection of the 2018 Venezuelan presidential election by the National Assembly of Venezuela, the U.S. Government recognized National Assembly president Juan Guaidó as the president of Venezuela. Guaidó immediately appointed a new board of directors for Citgo. Several days later, the U.S. imposed sanctions on PDVSA, freezing its assets in the U.S., and barring any U.S. firms and citizens from doing business with it. In February, Citgo cut ties with the PdVSA, and halted payments to them, placing them in a "blocked account". However, the sanctions limited Citgo's ability to refinance debt. In March, at the behest of the U.S. Treasury, 35 financial institutions secured a $1.2 billion loan to fund Citgo's daily operations and refinancing, allaying concerns about Citgo's ability to continue operating in the U.S.

On June 6, 2019, the U.S. Treasury expanded the sanctions, clarifying that exports of diluents to Venezuela could be subject to sanctions. Guaidó was given a special exemption from the sanctions.

In August 2019, the Delaware Chancery Court affirmed Guaidó's control of Citgo, finding that the U.S. acknowledged Guaidó as the president of Venezuela. In response, Maduro froze the bank accounts of the board of directors appointed by Guaidó. It was unclear if the board of directors was actually located in Venezuela at this time.

In 2020, Citgo borrowed money in the form of a bond, and used 50.1% of the company's equity as collateral. If the bond is not repaid, the institutional investors that lent the money will obtain ownership of the 50.1%.

In 2023, Guaidó's National Assembly dissolved itself due to a lack of confidence in Guaidó. The U.S. announced that despite the dissolution, it still recognized the winners of the 2015 Venezuelan parliamentary election as the sole legitimate governing body of Venezuela. Therefore the former National Assembly president Guaidó remained in control of Citgo.

In May 2024, Bloomberg reported that opposition-appointed executives of Petroleos de Venezuela were considering placing Citgo into Chapter 11 bankruptcy protection to slow down or completely block the sale of oil assets under the company's control. The opposition's plan would help it retain control of its most important overseas asset, which is up for auction.

==== Legal action against Citgo ====
On May 30, 2024, two former Citgo executives who were imprisoned by the Venezuelan government (two of the Citgo Six), sued Citgo for over $400 million, claiming that their imprisonment was a conspiracy and was wrongful, refused to keep them protected from harm, and increased emotional distress on both of them.

==== Sale ====
In November 2025, Elliott Investment Management affiliate Amber Energy purchased Citgo's parent PDV holdings in a court-ordered auction for $5.9 billion. Venezuela rejected the legitimacy of the sale, with Vice President Delcy Rodríguez calling it "fraudulent".

=== 2026 transfer to Rodríguez government ===
Following the U.S. capture of Venezuelan president Maduro, Maduro's vice president Delcy Rodríguez became interim president of Venezuela and received formal recognition from the U.S., removing the seven-year obstacle created by the recognition of Guaidó. In September 2026, the Rodríguez government removed control of Citgo from Guaidó's opposition board.

== Controversies ==
=== United States–Venezuela relations ===
Texaco sold some Citgo gas stations in the southeast when Chevron gained exclusive rights to the Texaco brand name in the U.S. in June 2006. On September 27, 2006, the 7-Eleven chain of convenience stores announced its 20-year contract with Citgo was coming to an end and would not be renewed. 7-Eleven spokeswoman Margaret Chabris said "Regardless of politics, we sympathize with many Americans' concern over derogatory comments about our country and its leadership recently made by Venezuela's president. Certainly Chavez's position and statements over the past year or so didn't tempt us to stay with Citgo."

7-Eleven stations subsequently went either unbranded or switched to competitor brands, most notably Marathon, which owned rival chain Speedway at the time. (Marathon coincidentally sold Speedway to 7-Eleven in 2021.) Marathon purchased Citgo's assets in Ohio during this time and led to the near-complete withdrawal of the Citgo brand from the state except in the Youngstown area, which were supplied by Citgo terminals in neighboring Pennsylvania due to its proximity to the Ohio-Pennsylvania border. In the years since, Marathon has had periods of considering buying Citgo outright, with the Venezuelan ownership being a major roadblock. In 2024, the Folk Oil Company of Homer, Michigan began rebranding 43 PS Marts from Sunoco to Citgo. The rebranding spans south east Michigan and Northwest Ohio.

Citgo launched a national ad campaign in the fall of 2006 emphasizing the company's corporate social responsibility. National television ads featuring Joe Kennedy also aired through February 2007 featuring ordinary Americans thanking Citgo and Venezuela for providing discounted heating oil to low-income people.

=== Environmental and safety concerns ===
During the 2000s, Citgo faced several legal actions over the operation of its Corpus Christi, Texas oil refinery. In 2007, it was convicted of a violation of the Clean Air Act for operating an oil-water separator without proper pollution-control equipment. It was found not guilty of a charge of emitting illegal levels of benzene into the environment. In 2009, a fire at the alkylation unit of the same plant resulted in the release of toxic hydrofluoric acid and the injury of two workers, one with severe burns. In February 2011, the company was fined over $300,000 for the incident.

In 2015, Amazon Watch said 11 percent of crude oil processed at the Corpus Christi refinery and 1 percent processed at the Lake Charles refinery was sourced from the Amazon rainforest.

=== Oil spill ===
==== Citgo Refinery - Calcasieu River Oil Spill - Calcasieu River, LA - June 2006 ====
On June 19, 2006, over 99,000 barrels of waste oil and millions of gallons of untreated oily wastewater overflowed from storage tanks and discharged into a containment area in CITGO’s Lake Charles Manufacturing Complex. An estimated 54,000 barrels of waste oil and an undetermined amount of oily wastewater flowed out of the containment area and into the Indian Marais, the Calcasieu River, and adjoining waterways in the Calcasieu Estuary.

Approximately 150 linear miles of shoreline habitats were affected by the spill, including hundreds of acres of marsh, intertidal, and subtidal sediments. The oil directly impacted fish, benthic organisms, and several species of birds, including secretive marsh birds such as rails and larger birds such as gulls.

The released oil was in a highly volatile and acutely toxic form, requiring initial closure of oiled areas to responders and natural resource damage assessment teams. The highly toxic compounds in the oil were soluble, resulting in significant mixing into the water column. Between June 23 and June 28, numerous fish kills were observed in and around the floating oil.

In the days following the spill, fishing and other recreational activities in the area were shut down.

On August 31, 2021, the U.S Department of Justice finalized a Consent Decree valued at $19.69 million to restore natural resources injured by the Citgo Refinery oil spill.

This Consent Decree settled claims of injuries and will go towards restoration projects that benefit habitats, fish, wildlife, and outdoor recreational activities impacted by the oil spill.

On February 24, 2022, the trustees released the Final Damage Assessment and Restoration Plan, with selected projects to restore the resources injured by the spill. The selected restoration projects include

- Restoring 392 acres of saline marsh, including tidal creeks, in shallow open water in Cameron Parish, Louisiana,
- Creating approximately 18 acres of oyster reef habitat in Cameron Parish, Louisiana and,
- Contributing to an ongoing large project to create suitable nesting habitat for coastal island nesting birds in Terrebonne Bay, Terrebonne Parish, Louisiana

With the projects identified in this Final Restoration Plan, the trustees aim to restore approximately 432 acres of habitat near the Calcasieu estuary to compensate for injuries to shoreline habitats, oysters and birds.

== Refinery locations ==
- Lake Charles, Louisiana
- Corpus Christi, Texas
- Lemont Refinery, Romeoville, Illinois

=== Former refineries ===
In 1901, the Warner-Quinlan Asphalt Company purchased several properties in Linden, New Jersey, for use as an asphalt manufacturing plant at the Tremley Point development, later a part of the planned Montgomery Terminal. In 1937, Cities Services took over substantially all assets of Warner-Quinlan under a bankruptcy reorganization, including the Linden plant. The plant suffered several major fires and explosions. A tank exploded in July 1914, and two major fires occurred at the plant, one in June, 1921 (still under Warner-Quinlan), and another in October, 1938 (under Cities Services). The 1921 fire destroyed almost the entire plant.

== Other brands ==
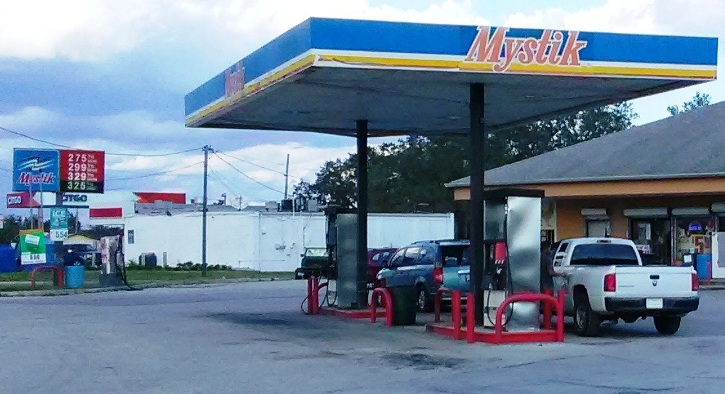
Davenport, Florida Mystik location, old design

In addition to Citgo's own brand of lubricants, they also own the Clarion and Mystik brand names.

Although primarily associated with lubricants, starting on October 1, 2003, Citgo began offering the Mystik brand name as a retail name.

== Sponsorships ==
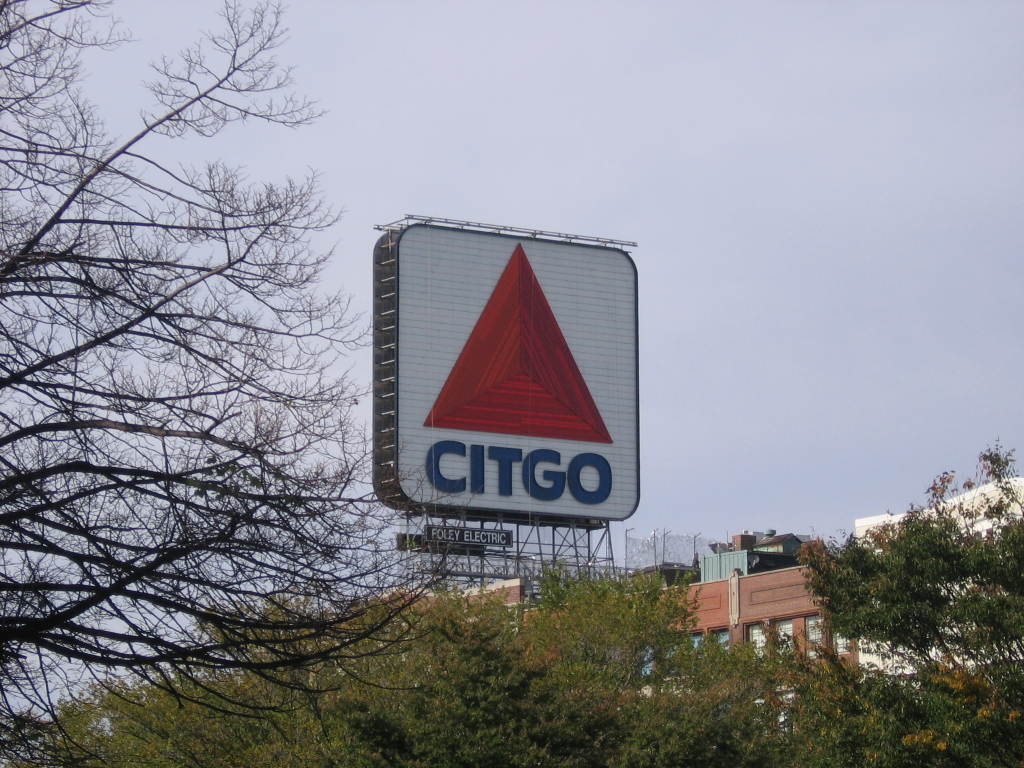
The Boston Citgo sign as seen from Lansdowne Street in Boston

Citgo has sponsored several motorsport ventures. The company was a sponsor of the No. 21 Wood Brothers racing team in NASCAR for many years, with drivers such as Michael Waltrip, Elliott Sadler, Kyle Petty, Neil Bonnett, Morgan Shepherd and Dale Jarrett. They also sponsored the No. 99 Roush Racing team of Jeff Burton from late 2000 until pulling out of the sport in 2003. The company sponsored the Citgo Pontiac-Riley of Venezuelan car driver Milka Duno in the Rolex Sports Car Series. Duno has three overall wins in the Rolex Series and finished second at the 2007 24 Hours of Daytona, becoming the highest-finishing female in the history of the famous race. Midway through the 2007 season, Citgo sponsored the No. 23 SAMAX Motorsport entry in the IndyCar Series for Duno. In 2008 and 2009 this sponsorship went with Duno to the Dreyer & Reinbold Racing No. 23 entry. She took the sponsorship to Dale Coyne Racing in 2010. Citgo was the major sponsor of E. J. Viso of KV Racing (2012) and Andretti Autosport (2013), and remained with Viso when he began racing in the Stadium Super Trucks in 2014.

=== Outdoor Sports ===
Citgo is a major sponsor of the Bassmaster Fishing Tournaments, and is also the sponsor of a charity golf tournament benefiting the Muscular Dystrophy Association (MDA). The company's relationship with the MDA goes back to its 1983 purchase by Southland, an existing MDA sponsor. Citgo is MDA's biggest corporate sponsor, and its executives have appeared on the Jerry Lewis MDA Telethon. Consistent with its former sponsorship of the Boston Marathon, Citgo has for the past few years sponsored an elite level multisport team that competes in both adventure racing and triathlon events throughout the United States.

=== Pro Sports Stadiums ===
A Citgo billboard sign overlooking Kenmore Square in Boston is widely associated with the Boston Red Sox baseball team, as it is visible from within Fenway Park overlooking its left field wall, the Green Monster. The sign's association with the team has also led to similar signs being installed at other baseball parks, including the Houston Astros' Daikin Park as part of their sponsorship of the team (until 2012, the sign was also in left field, much like the Red Sox; Occidental Petroleum now holds the placement). and Whataburger Field, home field of one of the Astros' minor league affiliates, the Corpus Christi Hooks.

=== Donald Trump inauguration ===
According to filings with the U.S. Federal Election Commission, in December 2016, Citgo donated $500,000 (approximately $671,000 in 2025 dollars) towards Donald Trump's 2017 presidential inauguration.

== Simón Bolívar Foundation ==
In 2006, Citgo established the Simón Bolívar Foundation (SBF) as a 501(c)(3) non-profit, charitable private foundation to "transform lives by connecting non-profits and community leaders to better improve the quality of life through the support of health initiatives". In 2020, the SBF provided grants of one $1M to provide humanitarian aid to Venezuela. The SBF runs a programme to help Venezuelan cancer patients travel abroad from for transplants and for other life-saving treatment. The programme was endangered by US sanctions on Venezuela. In 2021, the United Nations called on the US and other countries "to respect, protect and fulfil the human rights of every person affected by direct international action".

== Headquarters ==
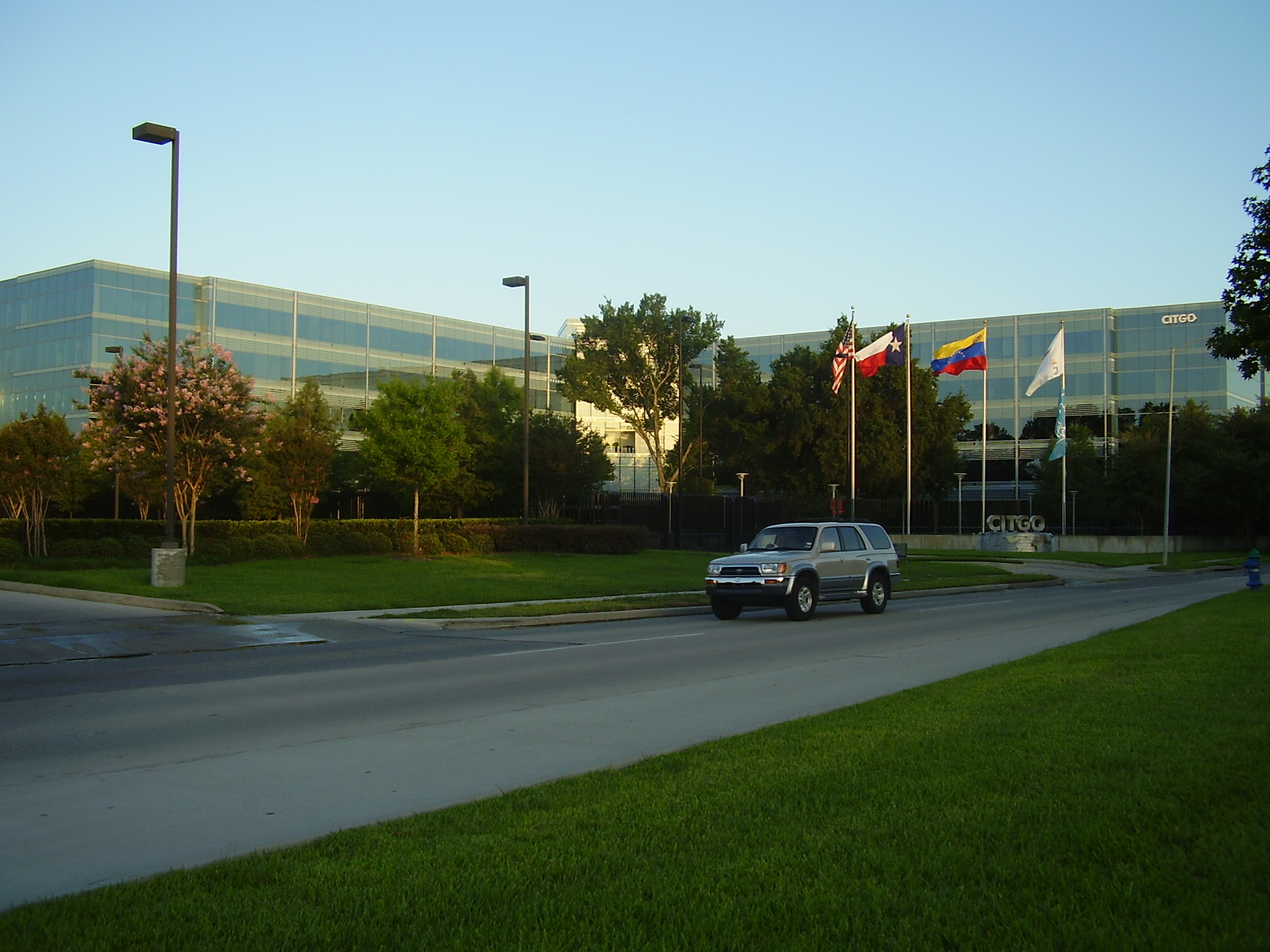
Citgo headquarters in the Energy Corridor area of Houston

Citgo has its headquarters in the Energy Corridor area of Houston, Texas, United States.

Before it was headquartered in Houston, Citgo had its headquarters in Tulsa, Oklahoma. In 2003, the Oklahoma governor Brad Henry met an executive of Citgo to discuss possible incentives that would keep the Citgo headquarters in Oklahoma. For eight months the company debated whether to move its headquarters or to keep its headquarters in Oklahoma. In 2004, the company announced that its headquarters were moving to Houston.

At that point the company had not decided which location in Houston would have the headquarters. The company wanted 300,000 square feet (28,000 m^{2}) of office space to house 700 employees. Citgo considered the 1500 Louisiana building in Downtown Houston, the Williams Tower in Uptown Houston, the BMC Software headquarters complex in Westchase, and the Aspentech Building in the Energy Corridor. In June of that year the company signed a lease in the five-storey Aspentech building so it could serve as a headquarters. In September 2004 the company began moving its headquarters, and by September 24 Citgo had already relocated 150 employees to the Energy Corridor offices.

== Leadership ==
=== President ===
1. Sam J. Susser, 1983 – February 1, 1985
2. Ronald E. Hall, February 1, 1985 – May 1 1995
3. Ralph S. Cunningham, May 1, 1995 – July 1, 1997
4. David James Tippeconnic, July 1, 1997 – October 16, 2000
5. Oswaldo Contreras Maza, October 16, 2000 – July 10, 2003
6. Luis Marin, July 10, 2003 – February 28, 2005
7. Felix Rodriguez, February 28, 2005 – May 2007
8. Alejandro Granado, May 2007 – June 2013
9. Nelson Martinez, June 2013 – January 2017
10. José Pereira (acting), January 2017 – November 2018
11. Asdrúbal Chávez, November 28, 2017 – February 2019
12. Luisa Palacios (interim), February 2019 – August 2019
13. Carlos E. Jorda, August 2019 – March 2026

== See also ==
- Brands of gasoline
- Oil reserves in Venezuela
