= W. Alton Jones =

American businessman (1891–1962)

William Alton Jones
- Born: April 19, 1891; Webb City, Missouri, US
- Died: March 1, 1962 (aged 70); Queens, New York City, US
- Other name: Pete Jones
- Employer: Cities Service Company
- Political party: Republican
- Spouse: Nettie Marie Marvin (m. 1914)
- Children: 2

William Alton Jones (April 19, 1891 – March 1, 1962) was president of the oil and gas conglomerate Cities Service. He was an influential industrialist, philanthropist, and close personal friend of United States President Dwight D. Eisenhower.

== Biography ==
Jones was born into a poor Missouri farm family of seven in 1891. He married his childhood sweetheart, Nettie Marie Marvin in 1914. In 1920 he became an executive with the energy company Cities Service Company, serving as president from 1940 to 1953. He rose to become one of the highest-paid CEOs in the United States. During World War II, he became a hero of war production by building a secret dynamite production plant in Arkansas, an aviation fuel refinery in Louisiana, and over 3,000 miles of oil pipelines from Texas to the East Coast that were vital to the war effort.

As an important supporter of the Republican Party, he met and became a very close personal friend of President Eisenhower.

In 1944 he founded the W. Alton Jones Foundation "to promote the well-being and general good of mankind through out [sic] the world". The foundation supported various causes, such as the arts, education, and environmental activism, but split into three separate funds in 2001.

Jones was killed in the crash of American Airlines Flight 1 in New York City on March 1, 1962, while on his way to join Eisenhower on a fishing trip.

Immediately after his death his widow, Nettie Marie Jones, donated his private hunting and fishing retreat (which had hosted President Eisenhower and King Mahendra of Nepal) to the University of Rhode Island, creating the W. Alton Jones Campus. The campus closed in June 2020 because of continuing financial struggles over several years.

== See also ==
- The W. Alton Jones Cell Science Center
- Burl S. Watson, Jones' successor and President during his tenure as CEO.
