= Big Inch =

Petroleum pipelines from Texas to New Jersey

Big and Little Inch pipelines
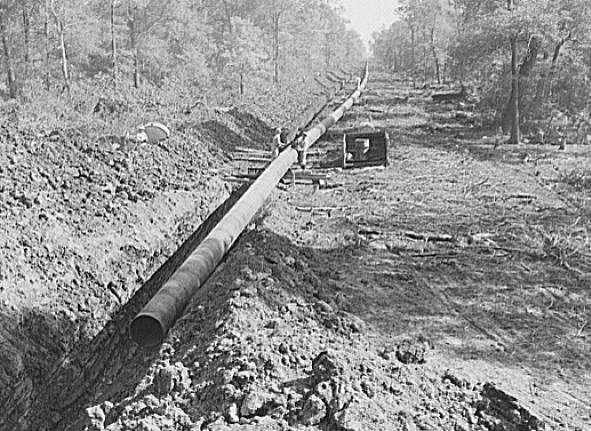
- Big Inch pipeline being laid, 1942

Location
- Country: United States

General information
- Type: Oil, natural gas
- Owner: Spectra Energy, Enterprise Products
- Construction started: 1942, 1943

Technical information
- Diameter: 20–24 in (508–610 mm)
- No. of pumping stations: 28, 7

The Big Inch and Little Big Inch, collectively known as the Inch pipelines, are petroleum pipelines extending from Texas to New Jersey, built between 1942 and 1944 as emergency war measures in the United States. Before World War II, petroleum products were transported from the oil fields of Texas to the north-eastern states by sea by oil tankers. After the U.S. entered the war on 1 January 1942, this vital link was attacked by German submarines in Operation Paukenschlag, threatening both the oil supplies to the north-east and its onward transshipment to Great Britain. The Secretary of the Interior, Harold Ickes, championed the pipeline project as a way of transporting petroleum by the more-secure, interior route.

The pipelines were government financed and owned, but were built and operated by the War Emergency Pipelines company, a non-profit corporation backed by a consortium of the largest American oil companies. It was the longest, biggest and heaviest project of its type then undertaken; the Big and Little Big Inch pipelines were 1,254 and 1,475 miles (2,018 and 2,374 kilometres) long respectively, with 35 pumping stations along their routes. The project required 16,000 people and 725,000 short tons (658,000 t) of materials. It was praised as an example of private-public sector cooperation and featured extensively in US government propaganda.

After the end of the war there were extended arguments over how the pipelines should be used. In 1947, the Texas East Transmission Corporation purchased the pipelines for $143,127,000 (equal to $2.0637 billion today), the largest post-war disposal of war-surplus property. The corporation converted them to transport natural gas, transforming the energy market in the north-east. The Little Big Inch was returned to carry oil in 1957. The pipelines are owned by Enbridge and Enterprise Products and remain in use.

== Background ==
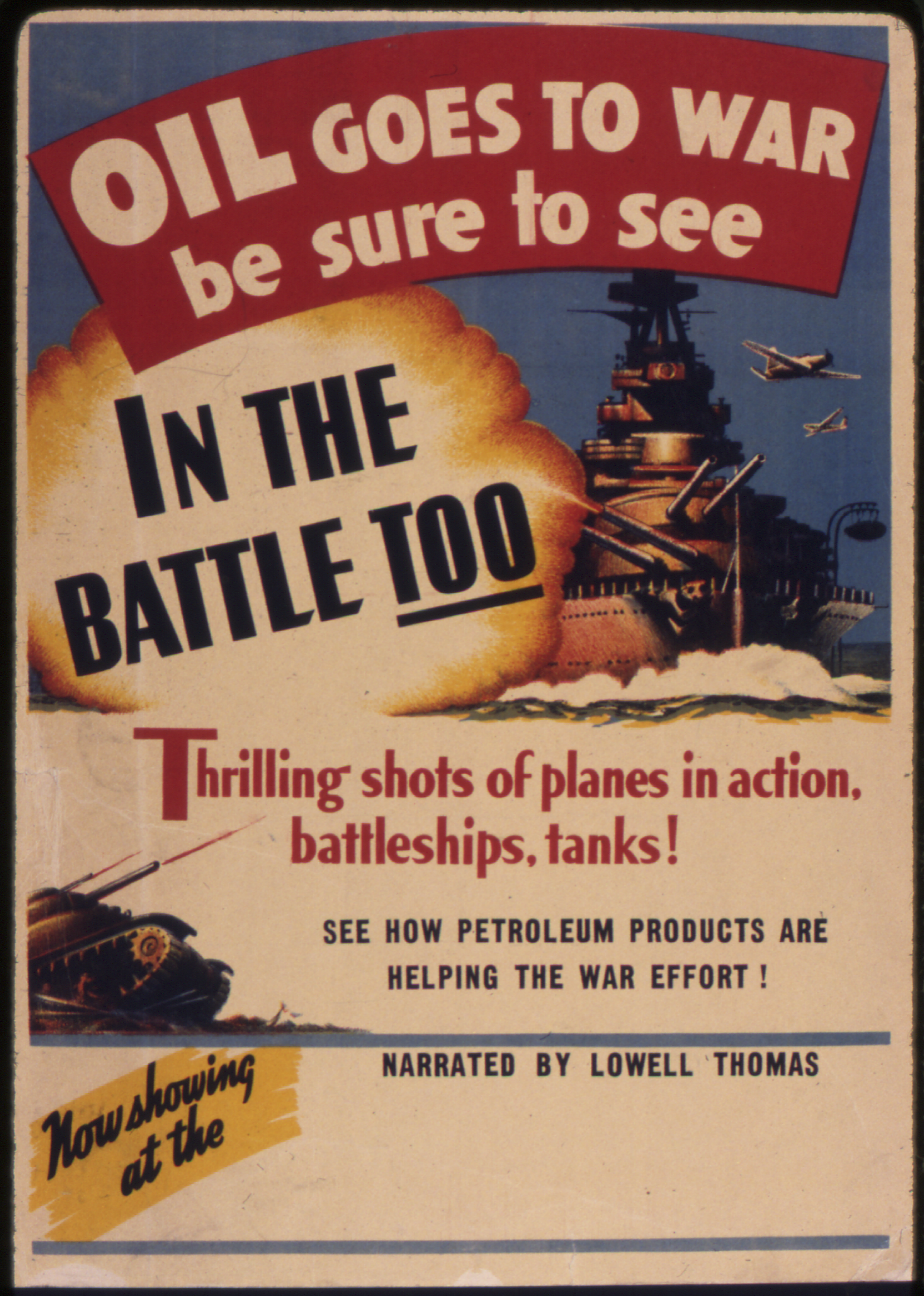
Poster advertising the importance of oil to the United States war effort

By the time that the United States entered World War II in 1941, oil was a vital part of military operations around the world. The United States produced 60 percent of the world's crude oil, with the state of Texas in the south-west leading this production, producing more than twice as much crude as any other state. The industry comprised a handful of very large producers and more than 3,500 smaller operators.

The north-east coast of the United States depended on these supplies of oil, importing both crude and refined products. Across most of Texas, there had been little interest in building pipelines to transport oil, and petroleum was typically moved from the south-west to the north-east coast using a mixture of sea freight and railroad transport. In early 1941, 70,000 barrels of oil were moved on the railroads each day, but this method was expensive, and the bulk of the oil was moved using barges, some with a capacity of up to 15,000 barrels, operating up and down rivers and the Atlantic Coast.

With the outbreak of war, the eastern sea routes of the country were attacked by German U-boat submarines. United States naval defence was very limited and largely obsolete; between January and April 1942, among other naval losses, 46 oil tankers were sunk and 16 damaged. The problem was made worse as 50 tankers had been sent to help the UK earlier in 1941. Insurers began to refuse to underwrite the remaining vessels and the volume of crude oil reaching the north-east from the Texas Gulf dropped.

In response, steps were taken to better protect the tankers from attack, but losses continued to mount until, in April 1942, they were banned by the Navy from operating the north-east sea routes. The government and industry took steps to maximise the use of the railroads, increasing the amount of oil carried on them more than ten-fold, but there were shortages of rail tank cars, and the existing fleet of cars was in poor condition. Instead, the United States government began to examine options for the use of pipelines to fulfil the demand for petroleum in the north-east.

== Concept ==
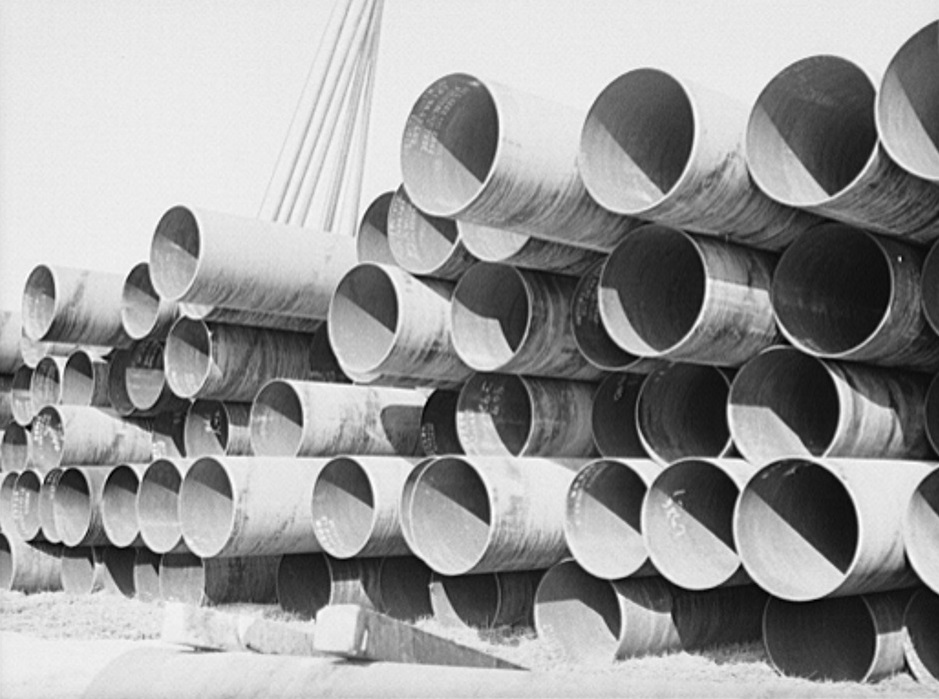
24" Big Inch pipes delivered by rail in February 1943

Transporting petroleum by pipeline from the south-west to the north-east was a potentially attractive option for the government as it would be safe from submarine attack and could operate efficiently regardless of the weather. Pipelines had been in use in the industry since 1862, but by the 1930s they were usually only 8 inches (200 mm) wide, able to deliver 20,000 barrels of oil a day; larger pipes could be built, but due to structural weaknesses they could not operate at the regular pressures. Technologies to build high-pressure pipes at sizes larger than 12 inches (300 mm) began to emerge during the two decades before the war, but their adoption was not commercially viable.

The concept of constructing such a pipeline was first proposed in 1940 by the Secretary of the Interior, Harold Ickes, who argued that "the building of a crude oil pipeline from Texas to the East might not be economically sound; but that in the event of an emergency it might be absolutely necessary". A consortium led by Standard Oil put forward a bid to build one in spring 1941, but the plan failed, due to concerns over the amount of steel that would be required for such a project. In May 1941, Ickes was appointed as the Petroleum Coordinator for National Defense, and in December 1942 became the administrator of the Petroleum Administration for War. New laws were passed to enable the building of pipelines necessary for the war effort, including the compulsory purchasing of land under the right of eminent domain.

Initial planning for the Inch pipelines began on May 15, 1941, when a meeting of Ickes and the oil industry commissioned an aerial survey of the possible route. A preliminary design was ready that September, and a consortium of major oil companies formed a new company, National Defense Pipelines, to build a pipeline along the route. The government Supply Priorities and Allocations Board, however, refused to approve the necessary steel, and the consortium's plan was dissolved shortly before the outbreak of war. After the outbreak of fighting, and the consequent deterioration of the sea routes for transporting oil, industry representatives met in March 1942 to produce a new pipeline strategy, called the Tulsa Plan. This included the construction of the Inch pipelines, backed by the slogan "longlines are lifelines", for which the steel was finally approved by the War Production Board on June 10.

Once steel supplies had been agreed, an initial tranche of $35 million in funding was provided by the government Reconstruction Finance Corporation, which owned and manage the operation of the pipelines through its subsidiary organizations, the Defense Plant Corporation and the Defense Supplies Corporation. In turn, the actual construction and operation of the pipelines would be carried out by the War Emergency Pipelines company (WEP), a non-profit corporation backed by a consortium of the largest oil companies in the United States: Atlantic Refining, Cities Service Oil, Consolidated Oil, Gulf Oil, Pan American Petroleum and Transport (Standard Oil of Indiana), Standard Oil of New Jersey, Tidewater Associated Oil, Shell Oil, Socony-Vacuum Oil, Sun Oil and the Texas Pipe Line Company. The WEP was led by Burt Hull and W. Alton Jones, both with extensive backgrounds in the industry, with Oscar Wolfe as its chief engineer. The company established its offices in Little Rock, Arkansas.

== Construction ==
=== Design and management ===
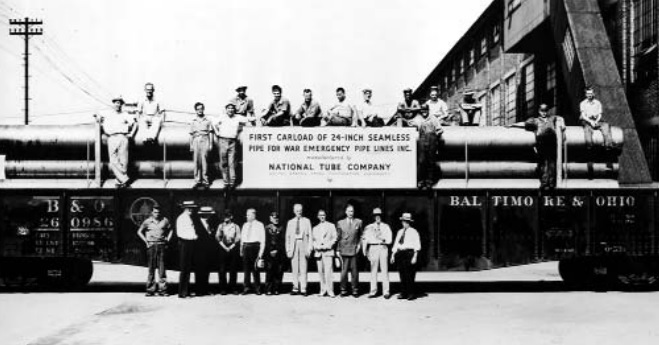
First carload of 24-inch (610 mm) seamless pipe for the Big Inch

The Inch pipelines comprised two systems, the Big Inch pipeline and the Little Big Inch pipeline. The Big Inch was a 24-inch (610 mm) pipeline for crude oil; it ran from the East Texas Oil Field at Longview, Texas, to Norris City, Illinois, and on to Phoenixville, Pennsylvania, from where it branched into 20-inch-diameter (510 mm) segments. One served New York and terminated at Linden, New Jersey, and the other served Philadelphia and terminated at Chester Junction, Pennsylvania. The Little Big Inch, a largely parallel 20-inch-diameter (510 mm) line intended for refined products, ran from Beaumont, Texas, to Little Rock, Arkansas, where it joined the path of the Big Inch, making use of the same pumping stations. From there it ran along the same right-of-way as the Big Inch to New Jersey and Pennsylvania.

The pipeline project was the longest, biggest and heaviest of its kind in the world. In total, the Big Inch pipeline was 1,254 miles (2,018 km) long, with 222 miles (357 km) of secondary distribution and feeder lines, and had 28 pumping stations along the route, approximately every 50 miles (80 km). The Little Big Inch was 1,475 miles (2,374 km) long, with 239 miles (385 km) of secondary lines, and had seven unique pumping stations along its southern leg.

Charles Cathers of the DPC directed the engineering project, with much of the work undertaken by Oscar Wolfe and, on the Little Inch pipeline, F. E. Richardson and L. F. Scherer. A meeting of all of the contractors for the build was held at the start of the July to kickstart the project; overall, 82 different companies would take on the pipeline work on a "cost-plus" basis, employing over 16,000 staff. The construction required the government to acquire permission to build the pipeline across 7,500 parcels of land; of these, the right of eminent domain had to be exercised in 300 cases. Major Jubel Parten, a director in the Petroleum Administration for War, considered the Inch pipelines to be part of “the most amazing Government-industry cooperation ever achieved”.

The pipelines were soon given the names "Big Inch" and "Little Big Inch" by the construction teams, on account of their unprecedented diameters. The construction project was extensively advertised, as part of the US government's war-time propaganda effort. Newsreels ran clips such as Pipeline Goes Through! and Pipe Dream Comes True-Oil!, and short-films were made about the construction work, including Pipeline. The pipelines also appeared in the RKO Pathé film Oil is Blood.

The National Tube Company of Lorain, Ohio produced from 137,500 tons of steel the pipe for the 550-mile section between Long View and Norris City in 4 month, the last shipment left on November 10, 1942, all together a total 4,600 gondola carloads. A contract for the first 360 miles for the section between Illinois and Pennsylvania was let to the same company on October 30. The last shipment of the total 280,106 tons from Lorain left about June 25, 1943.

=== Process ===
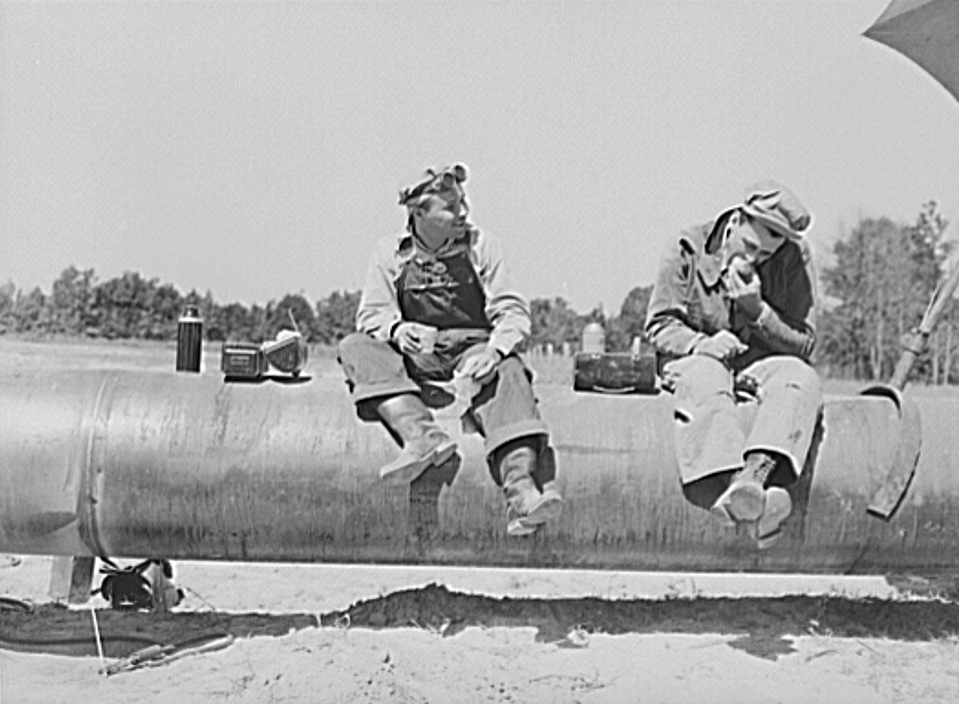
Workers on the Big Inch pipeline eating lunch, 1942

The Big Inch pipeline was made from sections of seamless 24-inch (61 cm) diameter steel pipe up to 44 feet (13 m) long, 3/8 inch (9.5 mm) thick and 4,200 pounds (1,900 kg) in weight. The Little Big Inch used both 5/16 inch (7.9 mm) thick seamless steel and electric weld pipe, and a small amount of 1/2 inch (13 mm) thick seamless pipe. In total, 21,185 railcar loads of steel piping were laid during the project, the Big Inch alone requiring 360,700 short tons (327,200 t) of steel.

The pipe was laid in trenches 4 feet (1.2 m) deep and 3 feet (0.91 m) wide, dug out by a combination of ditching machines and manual labor. The pipes were then cleaned by pulling a workman through the inside of them with cloths, and welded together, using both the "stovepiping" method and the roll-weld, or "firing line", methods. Stovepiping was an older method, in which the welder worked his way around two pipes, which remained stationary; the newer roll-weld approach instead rotated the pipes, allowing the welder to remain in one position as he worked, with up to seven pipes being welded together at the same time.

Where it was necessary for the pipeline to curve to fit the route, the steel pipes were bent, using either a cold-bending approach, in which tractors would pull and push the pipelines into position, or a hot-bending method, with the pipe heated up by blow-torches and pulled into place using a jig. A new, specialized piece of equipment for bending pipes, the Cummings bending jig, was invented during the Big Inch build, and used on the construction of the Little Big Inch pipeline. To protect the pipeline from corrosion, its outside was then cleaned by machine, and painted in first a layer of coal tar enamel, and then hot coal tar coating, before being wrapped in asbestos felt. Finally the pipeline was lowered into position, taking care not to damage the ends of the pipes; the larger pipes were so heavy that they required a D-8 caterpillar tractor equipped with counter-weights to lift them. The trench was then back-filled, completing the process.

The Big Inch pipeline had to pass under 33 rivers and 200 creeks and lakes, as well as under 289 railroad and 626 highway intersections. Specially lined tunnels were bored to lay the pipe under the roads and railroad lines, and specialist trenches dug to lay the pipelines across on the riverbeds and lakes, weighing down the pipeline to stop it floating to the surface. Around 4 miles (6.4 km) of underwater piping was laid in total. In marshy areas, the soft ground was filled in to provide firm foundations for the pipeline to rest on.

The pumping stations for the pipelines were built on parcels of land between 11 acres (4.5 ha) and 44 acres (18 ha) in size; those with storage tanks were between 90 acres (36 ha) and 131 acres (53 ha) big. The plain, utilitarian buildings were initially prefabricated steel constructs, but as supplies grew scarce, wood was used instead. As much as 725,000 short tons (658,000 t) of materials was needed for the total project.

=== Completion ===
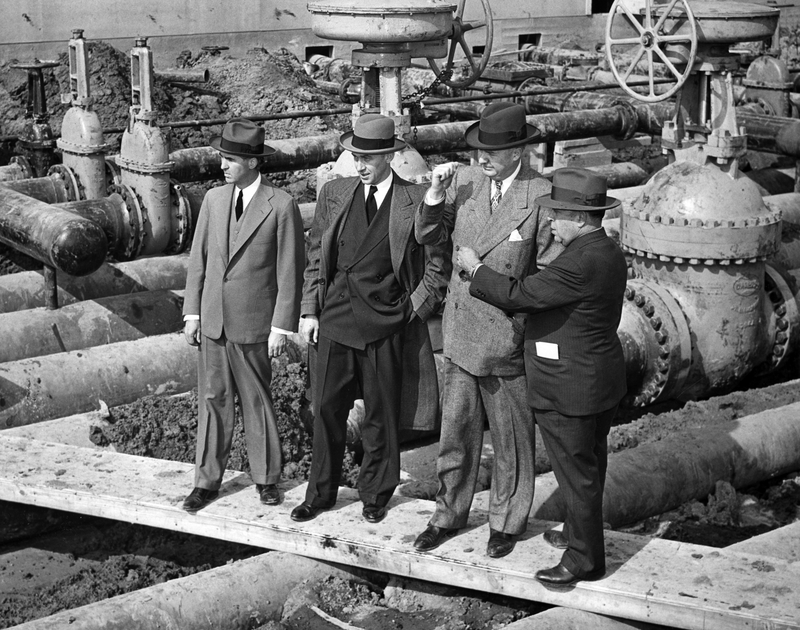
Ralph K. Davies, George Hull, W. Alton Jones and Burt Hull at the official opening, February 19, 1943

Work on the Inch pipelines began immediately after the establishment of the WEP on June 26, 1942. They were built in three phases. The first part to be constructed was the Big Inch, its initial leg running to an interim terminal at Norris City, where oil was to be off-loaded to the railroad network. Once this leg was complete, it was extended to its terminus at Phoenixville. When the Big Inch was complete, work began on the third phase of the project, the Little Big Inch.

The first purchase order, for 137,500 short tons (124,700 t) of 24-inch-diameter pipe, was placed on July 2, 1942. To meet a construction deadline of January 1, 1943, the laying of pipe began on August 3, 1942, near Little Rock. Other pipeline crews began work immediately on segments elsewhere in Arkansas and Texas. By September 10 all eight pipelaying crews, each consisting of between 300 and 400 men, were in the field working. The schedule called for 5 miles (8.0 km) of the Big Inch pipeline to be laid each day. But soon men were laying as much as 9 miles (14 km) a day. In all, roughly 7,000,000 cubic yards (5,400,000 m^{3}) of material were excavated. Oil began flowing through the Big Inch Line between Texas and Illinois on New Year's Eve 1942. Work on the Little Big Inch then began in 1943.

The first crude oil arrived at Phoenixville via the Big Inch on August 14, 1943, and the first refined product in the Little Big Inch arrived on March 2, 1944. The pipelines were officially dedicated at a ceremony in Rockwood, Pennsylvania, on Friday, March 24, 1944; participants included U.S. Rep. J. Buell Snyder, George A. Wilson (Director of Supply & Transportation of the Petroleum Administration for War), and W. Alton Jones (President of War Emergency Pipelines). The Big Inch carried up to 334,456 barrels of crude oil a day, the Little Big Inch 239,844 barrels of gasoline; the lines were among the largest industrial consumers of electricity in the US, requiring 3.89 million kilowatt hours a day to pump the oil along the pipes.

=== Construction process, recorded by John Vachon ===
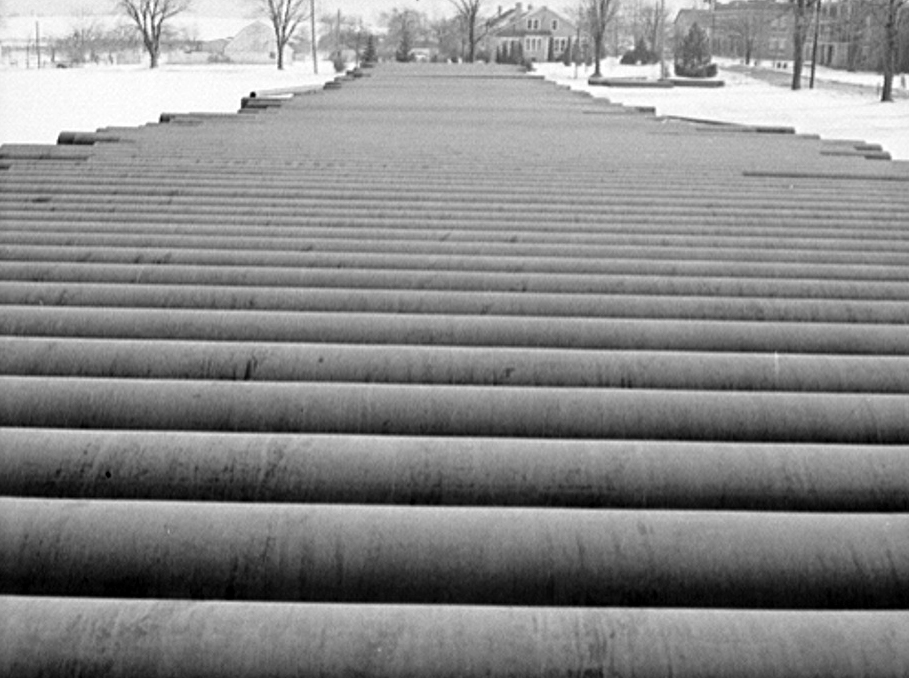
Big Inch pipes delivered.

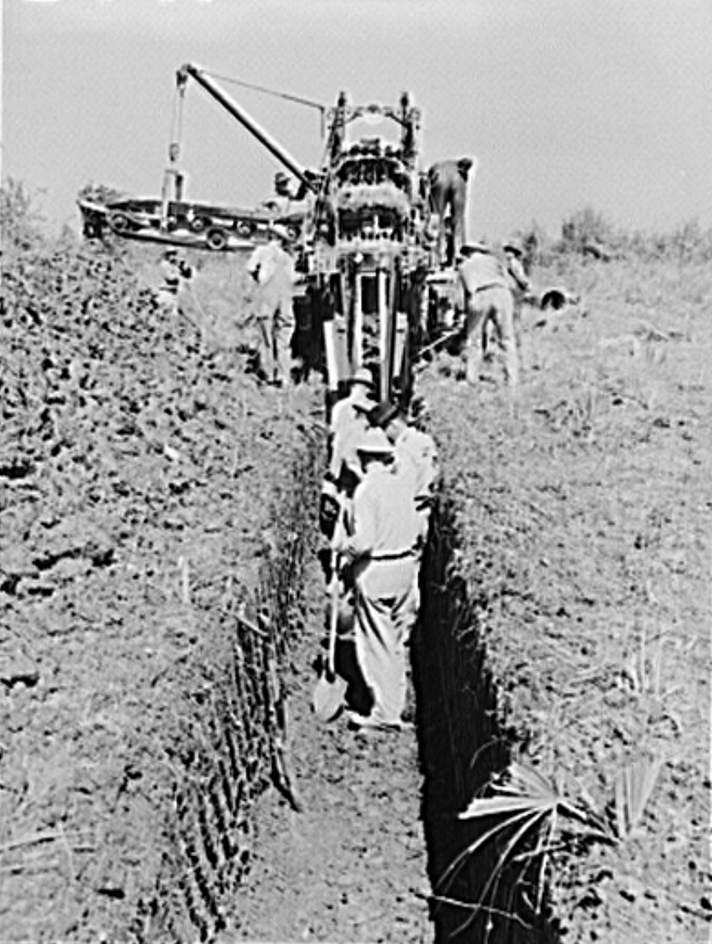
Digging the trench by machine...

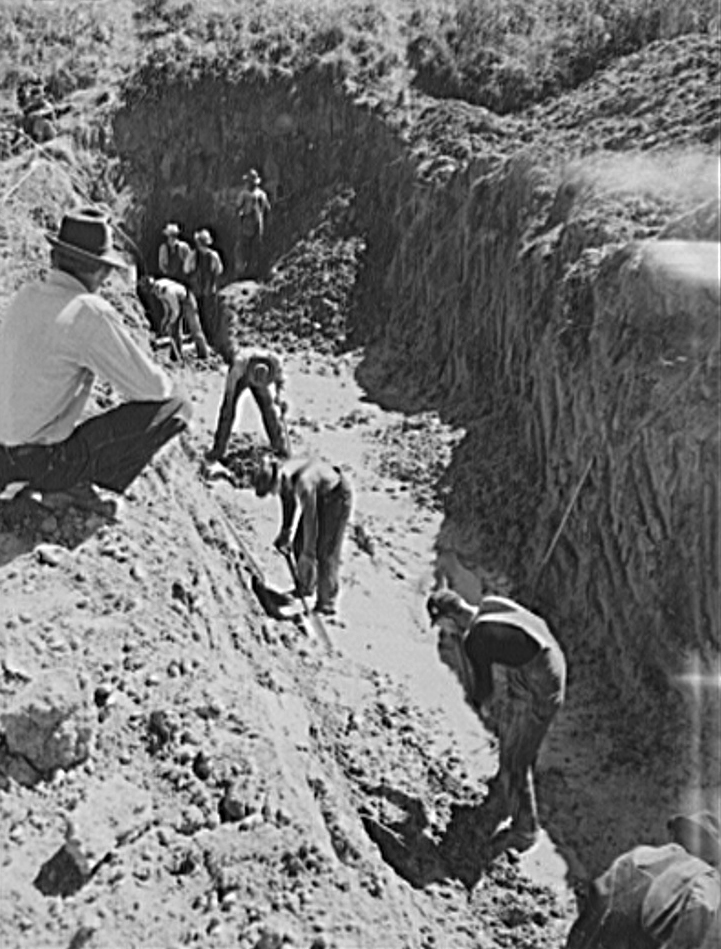
...or by hand.

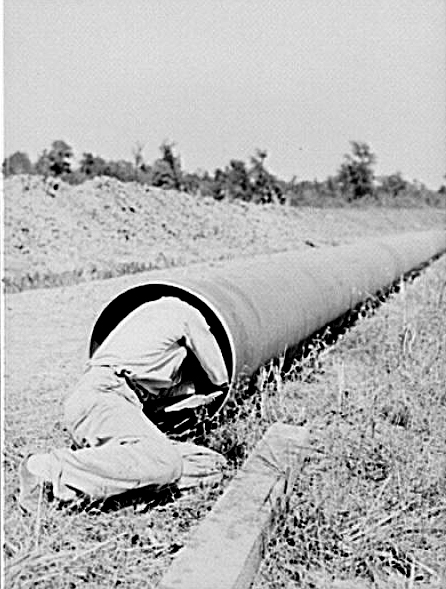
Cleaning the inside of the pipe by hand,

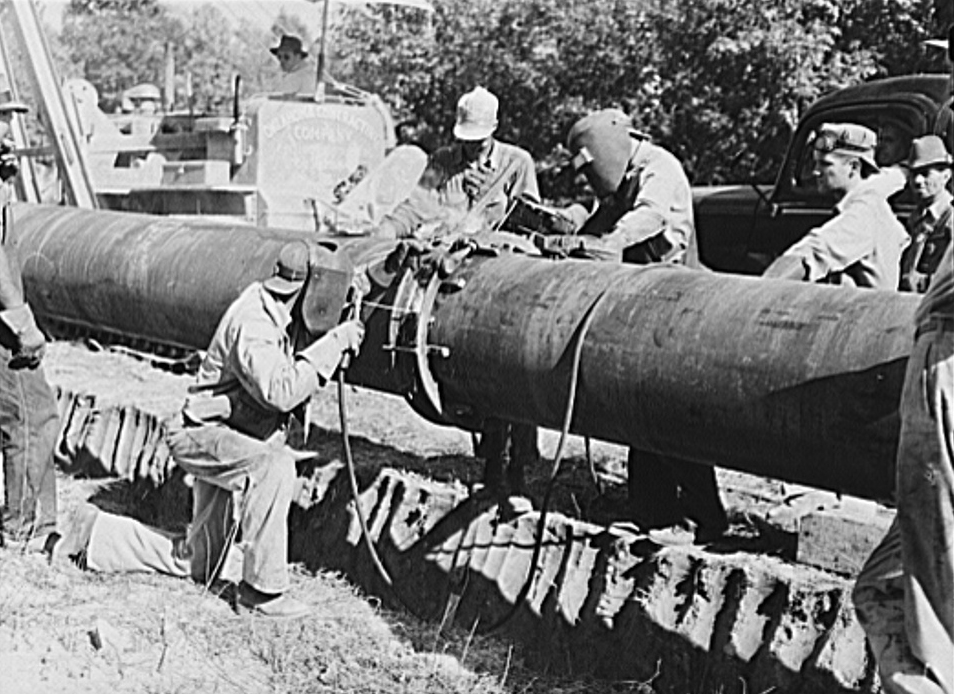
welding by the stovepipe method,

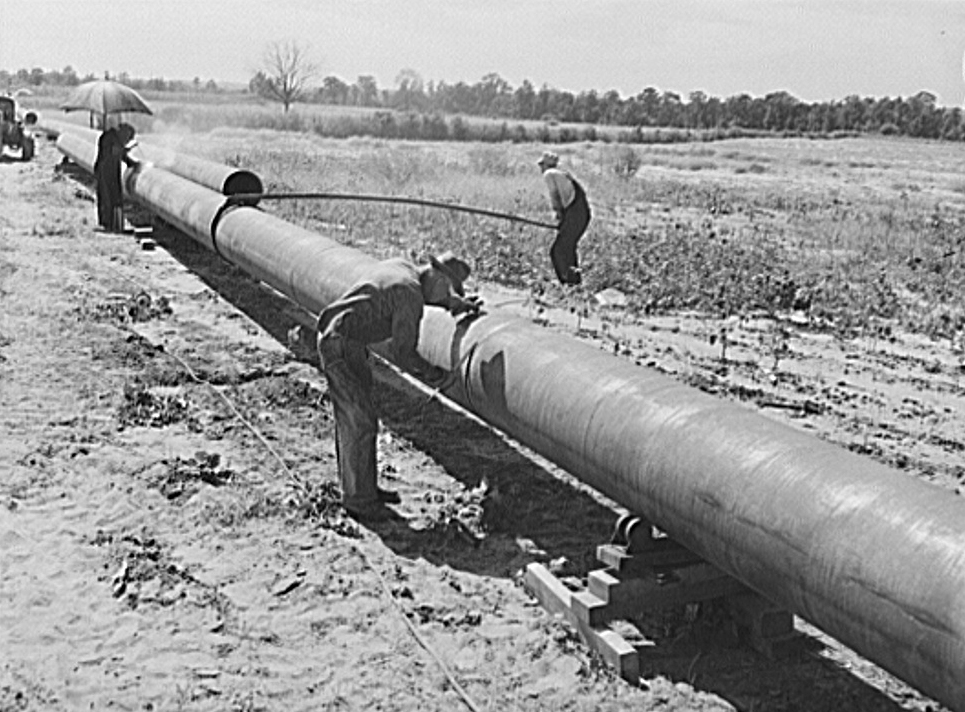
or the roll-weld approach...

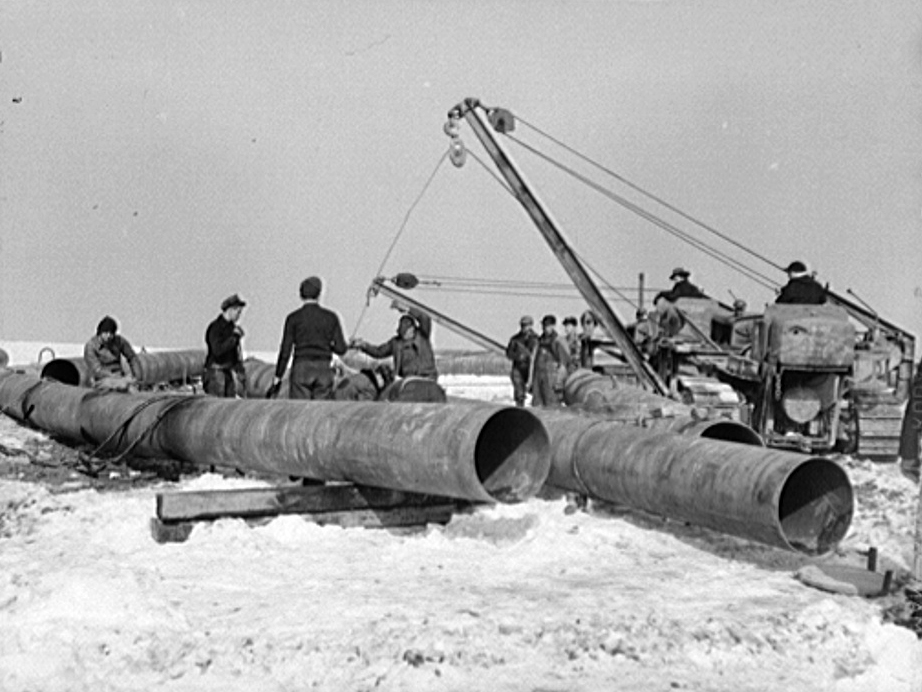
...and bending the pipes if necessary.

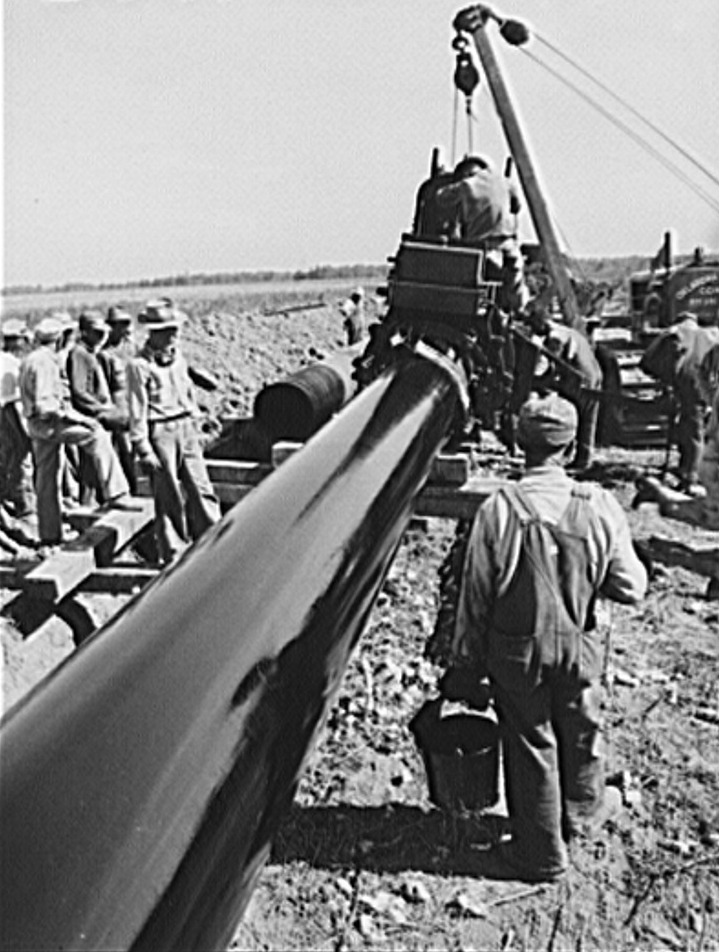
Priming with hot asphalt paint...

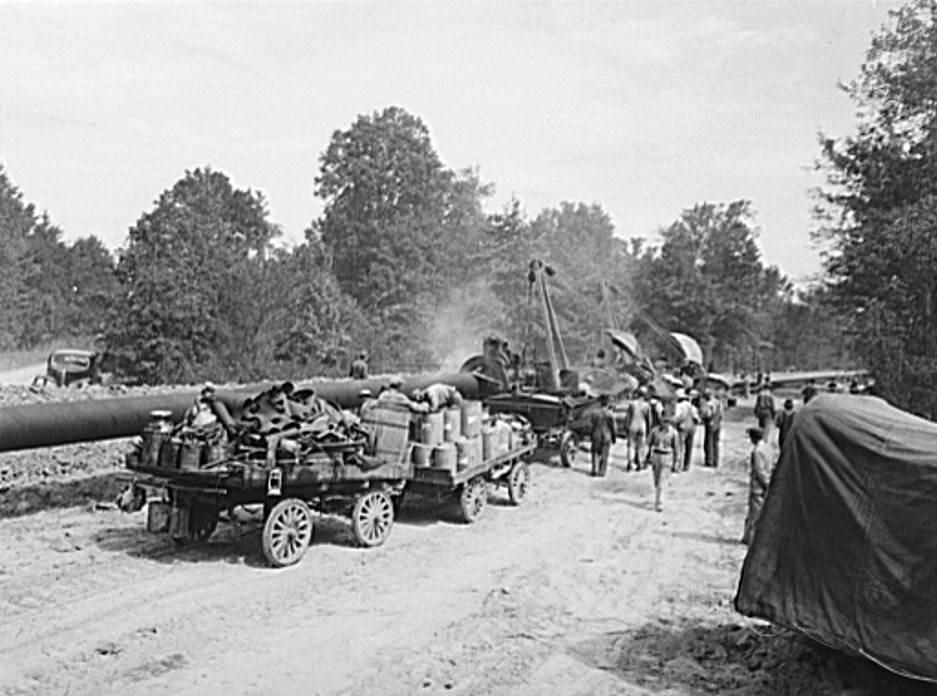
...and wrapping with felt.

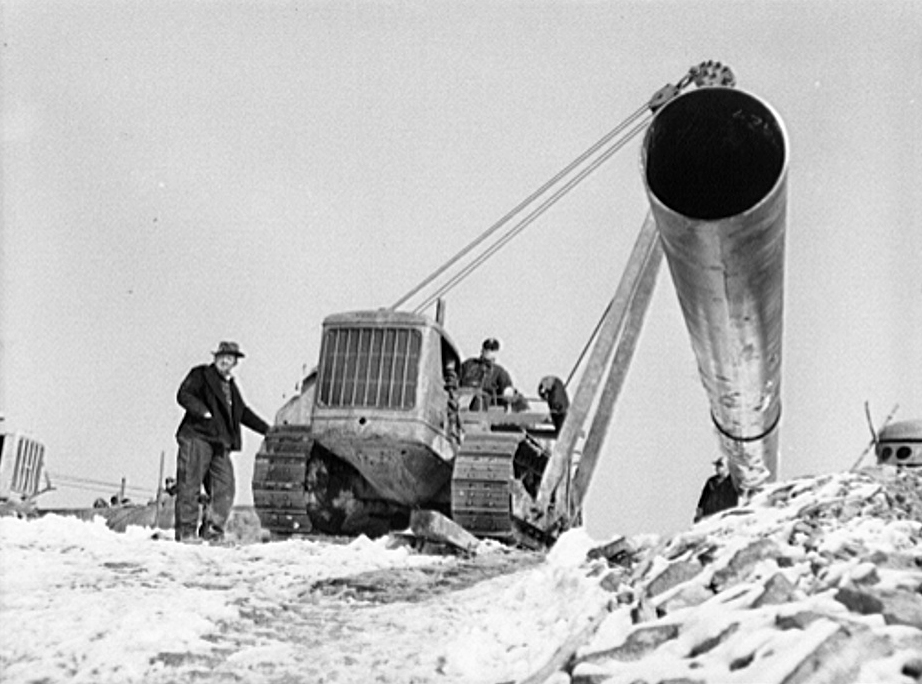
Hoisting pipe into place with a caterpillar tractor,

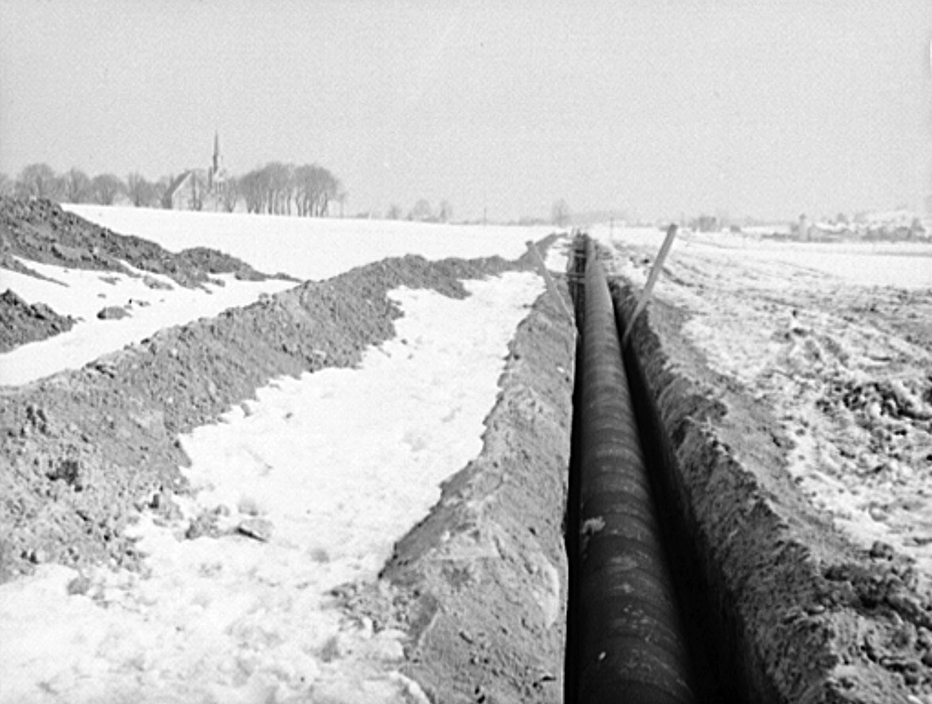
the completed pipeline laid...

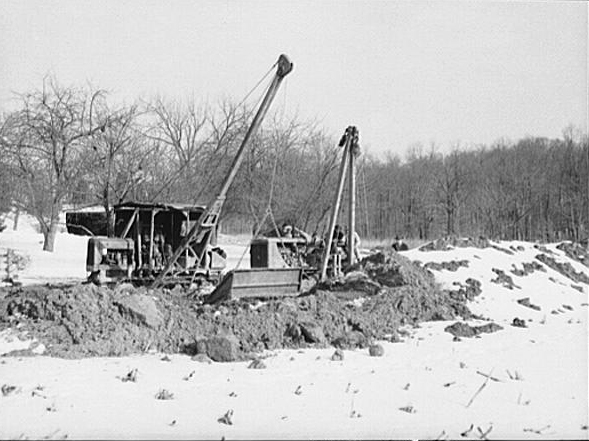
...and being backfilled.

== Post-war sale ==
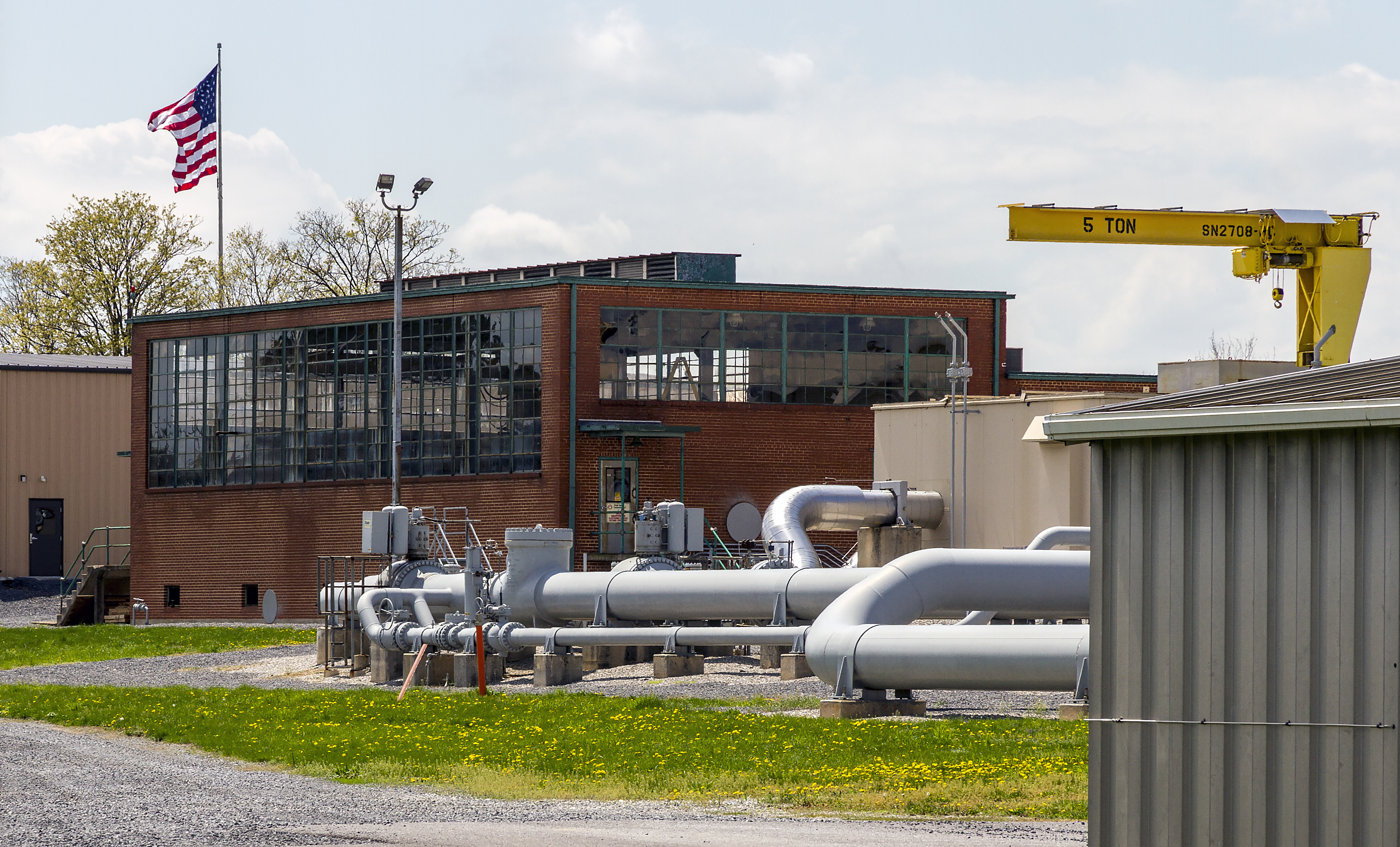
Pumping station building near Chambersburg, Pennsylvania, in 2014

By the end of the war, there was considerable debate over the future of the pipelines. The major oil companies, such as Standard Oil, campaigned for the conversion of the pipelines for the transfer of natural gas. Engineers contracted to the US Surplus Property Administration proposed using the lines for natural gas, and the Tennessee Gas Transmission Company conducted a four-month trial. Demand for natural gas was rising rapidly, and it was produced in large quantities in the Texas oilfields, but could not be got to market in the north-east and was otherwise burnt off uselessly into the atmosphere. The railroad and coal companies, who saw this as likely to introduce additional competition for coal and coal gas, and therefore lower demand for their goods and services, argued against this move. The smaller oil companies proposed continuing to use the pipelines for oil in order to undermine the transport monopolies of the larger corporations.

A government inquiry was undertaken to determine the future use of the pipelines, and took evidence from the various stakeholders, most of whom presented the case that favored their companies or industry. The inquiry concluded that the pipelines should be sold for continued use in transporting petroleum. An auction for the pipelines was announced in 1946, which was designed to give preference to bidders who intended to use them for moving petroleum. 16 bids were received, with the highest cash bidders being companies hoping to use the pipelines for natural gas. Assessing the different bids proved difficult and the discussions became enmeshed in national politics, with companies seeking support from various Washington politicians. Meanwhile, a threatened national coal strike raised concerns over the availability of natural gas, strengthening the arguments of the natural gas lobby.

A fresh inquiry was declared in November, voiding the previous competition and the Inch Lines were transferred to the War Assets Administration on December 2, 1946, for disposal. Pending any final decision on their sale, the lines were leased to the Tennessee Gas Company for use in shipping natural gas as far as Ohio and the Appalachians, but no further east, and only for 12 months. Tennessee Gas did not convert the pipelines in any way for their new role, and simply pumped the gas through the system under its own pressure, moving 138,000,000 cubic feet (3,900,000 m^{3}) of gas a day in this way.

A second auction was held, with bids for natural gas given equal weight to those wishing to transfer crude oil, although any natural gas bidder would be obliged to maintain the oil pumping stations for use in a national emergency. Ten bids were received and on February 8, 1947, the Texas East Transmission Corporation (TETCO) was declared successful, after the intervention of the Texas Senator Lyndon Johnson who was close to the Browns. Its bid of $143,127,000 would make the disposal the largest sale of war-surplus property to the private sector following World War II.

== Conversion by TETCO ==
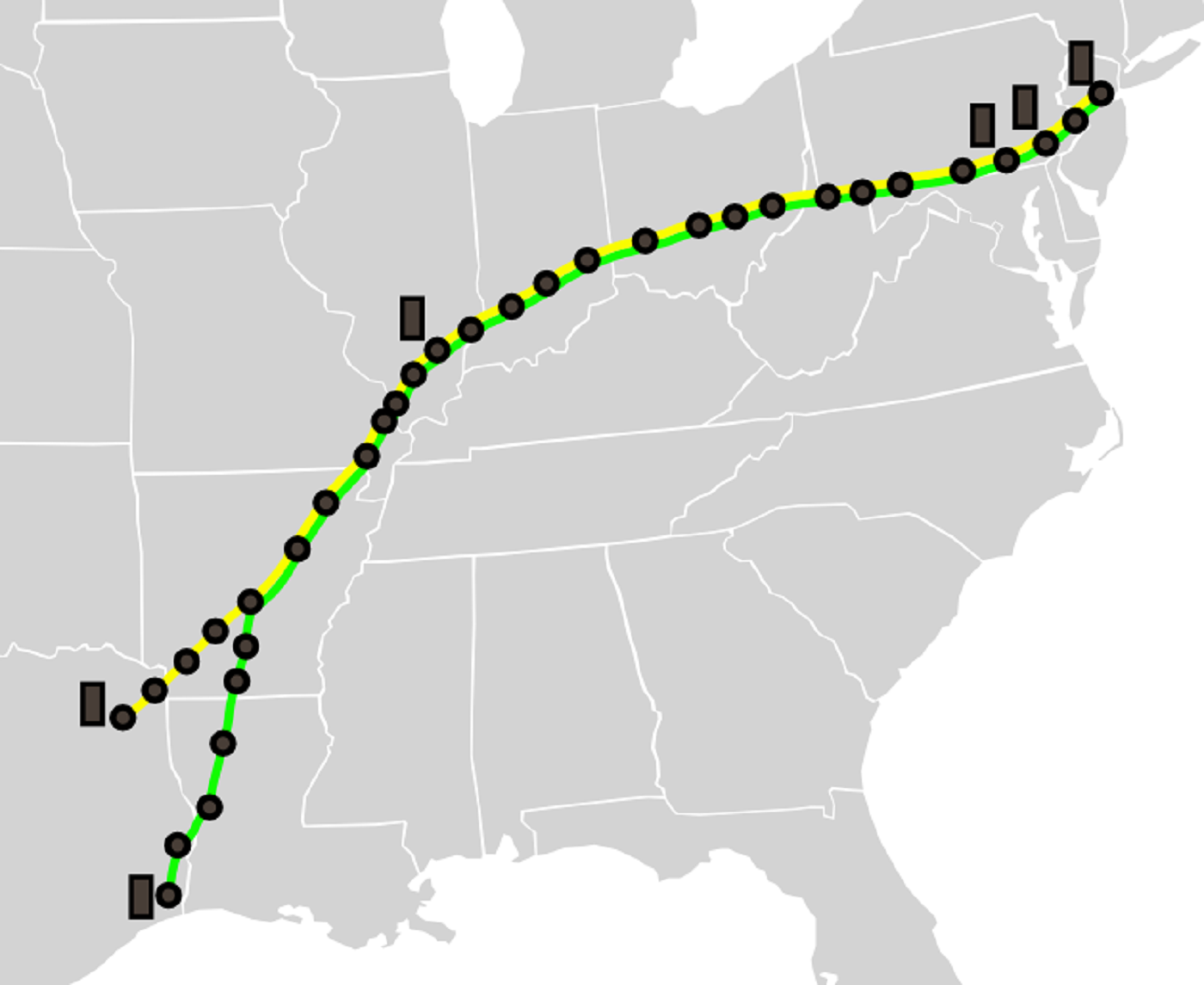
Map of the Inch pipelines: yellow - Big Inch, green - Little Inch; circles - pumping stations; rectangles - storage tank farms

TETCO was the brainchild of corporate lawyers Charles Francis and James Elkins, who convinced the construction specialists George and Herman Brown, and the fuel engineer E. Holley Poe, that buying the Big and Little Inch pipelines could be a lucrative opportunity. The corporation was established specifically for the purposes of the bid, and came to their bidding figure by estimating that the likely competition would bid at $130 million; their own figure exceeded this by 10 percent, and added on $127,000 to avoid a suspiciously round number. TETCO believed it could afford to make this offer because it intended to reuse the electric motors in the oil pumping mechanisms for moving the natural gas; it also believed that the price of gas would rise considerably in the post-war markets.

After winning the bidding, TETCO raised the money to pay the government through a combination of bonds and share issues. A further government enquiry was required before the sale was allowed to go through, which was complicated by the reluctance of the state of Pennsylvania to allow the pipelines to be used to pump gas east through its territory. The government of Pennsylvania was influenced by the coal industry, who feared they would lose sales, but it eventually relented and the sale of the pipelines to TETCO was finally completed on November 1. The value of the company soared, and the original investors saw the value of their holdings increase 63-fold.

TETCO immediately began to convert the pipelines for permanent use as natural gas transmission lines, under the direction of Baxter Goodrich, their chief engineer. 24 compressor stations were constructed along the pipeline with centrifugal compressors, increasing the capacity of the system to 433,000,000 cubic feet (12,300,000 m^{3}) of gas a day, and the old oil pumps were retained for reuse in a future crisis. Steel valves replaced the older, less reliable cast iron designs. Demand continued to increase, requiring additional compressor capability, and by January 1949 the pipelines were moving 508,000,000 cubic feet (14,400,000 m^{3}) a day.

The supply route undermined the local markets for manufactured gas, and the major cities of the north-east rapidly converted to the use of natural gas; historian David Waples describes how the pipelines contributed to "an extraordinary expansion of natural gas customers and gas company employees after World War II". The Inch pipelines encouraged the development of further long distance pipelines in the US through the 1960s and 1970s.

== Later use ==
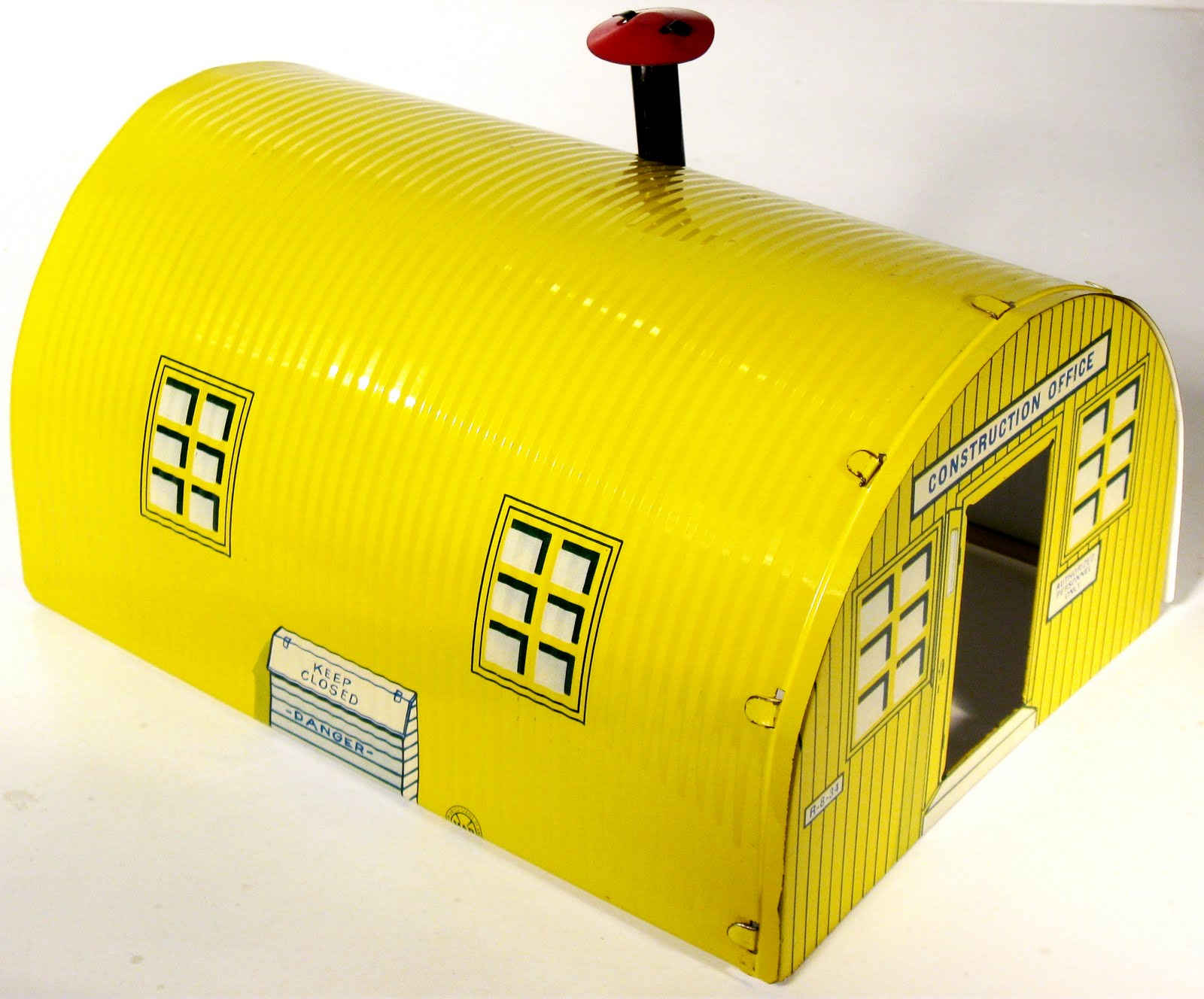
1962 toy Quonset hut, sold as part of the Marx "Big Inch pipeline" construction set

In 1957, the operation of the Little Big Inch, and its ownership south of Ohio, was transferred from TETCO to the subsidiary Texas Eastern Petroleum Products Corporation (TEPPCO), and converted back to use for petroleum products. TEPPCO was purchased by Enterprise Products in 2010. Around 1961, there was discussion of converting the Big Inch pipeline back to petroleum use, but it continued in use as a gas pipeline. In 1989, TETCO was taken over by the Panhandle Eastern Corporation, and in 1997 this company was merged with Duke Power, to form the Duke Energy Corporation; in 2007, the oil pipelines were spun off from Duke Energy, to form part of Spectra Energy Partners.

The Inch pipelines are listed on the National Register of Historic Places. Along the western parts of the pipelines, around 90 percent of the pipes are the original installation, although in the east large parts have since been replaced, largely due to the absence of anti-corrosion protective coatings on the original piping. 62 of the original buildings from 1942 and 1943 remain, including pump-houses, offices, employee houses and garages. The best surviving examples of the original buildings are in Pennsylvania. A "Big Inch pipeline" construction playset was produced as a children's toy in 1962 by the Marx company.

Naming pipelines X-inch became a habit:

- Biggest Inch: 30-inch natural gas line from Blythe, California to Santa Fe Springs, California. First ever long distance 30-inch pipe line (1947).
- Steepest Inch: 10 mile 8-inch products pipeline from the coast to Caracas over an extremely mountainous route (1950).
- Super Inch: 34-inch natural gas pipeline of PG&E (1950).
- Steepest Inch: 46.1 mile 6-inch pipeline from Bucay, Ecuador to Palmira (1953).
- Scenic Inch: Northwest Pipeline Co. line through the Rocky Mountains.

== List of pumping stations ==
=== Big Inch and northern Little Big Inch ===
- Station No. 1: Longview, Texas
- Station No. 2: Atlanta, Texas
- Station No. 3: Hope, Arkansas
- Station No. 4: Donaldson, Arkansas
- Station No. 5: Little Rock, Arkansas
- Station No. 6: Bald Knob, Arkansas
- Station No. 7: Egypt, Arkansas
- Station No. 8: Fagus, Missouri
- Station No. 9-a: Oran, Missouri
- Station No. 9-b: Gale, Illinois
- Station No. 10: Lick Creek, Illinois
- Station No. 11: Norris City, Illinois
- Station No. 12: Princeton, Indiana
- Station No. 13: French Lick, Indiana
- Station No. 14: Seymour, Indiana
- Station No. 15: Oldenburg, Indiana
- Station No. 16: Lebanon, Ohio
- Station No. 17: Circleville, Ohio
- Station No. 18: Crooksville, Ohio
- Station No. 19: Sarahsville, Ohio
- Station No. 20: Wind Ridge, Pennsylvania
- Station No. 21: Connellsville, Pennsylvania
- Station No. 22: Rockwood, Pennsylvania
- Station No. 23: Chambersburg, Pennsylvania
- Station No. 24: Marietta, Pennsylvania
- Station No. 25: Phoenixville, Pennsylvania
- Station No. 26: Lambertville, New Jersey
- Station No. 27: Linden, New Jersey

=== Southern part of the Little Big Inch ===
- Station A: Baytown, Texas
- Station B: Beaumont, Texas
- Station C: Newton, Texas
- Station D: Many, Louisiana
- Station E: Castor, Louisiana
- Station F: El Dorado, Arkansas
- Station G: Fordyce, Arkansas

== See also ==
- Canol Project, World War II U.S. Army pipeline system in Northern Canada and Alaska
- Exolum Pipeline System comparable British project
- Operation Pluto, another World War II petroleum pipeline

== Bibliography ==
- Casella, Richard M.; Wuebber, Ingrid (1999). War Emergency Pipeline (Inch Lines), HAER No. TX-76 (PDF). Washington, D.C., US: Library of Congress.
- Castaneda, Christopher James (1993). Regulated Enterprise: Natural Gas Pipelines and Northeastern Markets, 1938-1954. Columbus, US: Ohio State University Press. ISBN 9780814205907.
- Hyman, Harold Melvin (1998). Craftsmanship and Character: A History of the Vinson and Elkins Law Firm of Houston, 1917-1997. Athens, US: University of Georgia Press. ISBN 9780820319735.
- Klein, Maury (2013). A Call to Arms: Mobilizing America For World War II. New York, US: Bloomsbury Press. ISBN 9781596916074.
- Locke, Tom (1961). "The Oil Pipeline Industry". In National Academy of Sciences; National Research Council (eds.). Transportation design considerations : Selections from the Proceedings of the Transportation Research Conference, Convened by the National Academy of Sciences at Woods Hole, Massachusetts, August 1960. Washington, D.C., US: National Academy of Sciences - National Research Council. pp. 231–241. OCLC 1855350.
- Nersesian, Roy L. (2010). Energy for the 21st Century: A Comprehensive Guide to Conventional and Alternative Sources (2nd ed.). Armonk, New York, US: M. E. Sharpe. ISBN 9780765624123.
- Olien, Diana Davids; Olien, Roger M. (2002). Oil in Texas: The Gusher Age, 1895-1945. Austin, US: University of Texas Press. ISBN 0292760566.
- Texas Eastern Transmission Corporation (2000). The Big Inch and Little Big Inch Pipelines: The Most Amazing Government-Industry Cooperation Ever Achieved (PDF). Houston, US: Texas Eastern Transmission Corporation. OCLC 44921654. Archived from the original (PDF) on 2016-09-10.
- Vanderbilt, Tom (2005). "After the War: Quonset Huts and their Integration into Daily American Life". In Decker, Julie; Chiei, Chris (eds.). Quonset Hut: Metal Living for a Modern Age. New York, US: Princeton Architectural Press. pp. 63–104. ISBN 9781568986548.
- Vassiliou, M. S. (2009). Historical Dictionary of the Petroleum Industry. Lanham, Maryland, US: Scarecrow Press. ISBN 9780810859937.
- Waples, David A. (2012). The Natural Gas Industry in Appalachia: A History from the First Discovery to the Tapping of the Marcellus Shale (2nd ed.). Jefferson, N.C., US: McFarland. ISBN 9780786470006.
