= W. Alton Jones Foundation =

Former US-based charity

- Founded: 1944
- Founder: W. Alton Jones
- Dissolved: September 2001
- Location: Charlottesville, Virginia
- Endowment: $400,000,000

The W. Alton Jones Foundation was a charitable foundation, and a sponsor of environmental causes. It was originally involved in sponsoring the arts, particularly theatre.

The foundation was started in 1944 by W. Alton "Pete" Jones, an oil executive and chairman of the board of Cities Service Company. In 2001, the Charlottesville, Virginia-based 56-year-old W. Alton Jones Foundation suddenly dissolved. The $400 million endowment was split into three separate Foundations: the Blue Moon Fund run by Patricia Jones Edgerton (daughter of W. Alton Jones) and her daughter Diane Edgerton Miller, the Oak Hill Foundation run by son William Edgerton, and the Edgerton Foundation run by son Brad Edgerton.
