= Henry Latham Doherty =

American businessman (1870–1939)

- Born: May 15, 1870; Columbus, Ohio
- Died: December 26, 1939 (aged 69); Philadelphia, Pennsylvania
- Occupations: Investor, oilman
- Years active: 1882–1939
- Notable work: Founded Cities Service Company (now Citgo)
- Spouse: Grace Eames

Henry Latham Doherty (May 15, 1870 – December 26, 1939) was an American financier and oilman, a native of Columbus, Ohio. In 1910, he created the Cities Service Company, a utility holding company that later became the Citgo Petroleum Corporation. He was of Irish descent.

== Business career ==
Doherty was first hired by the Columbus Gas Company at the age of 12. He reportedly wrote years later, "I could not get along in school... and was under expulsion a large part of the time I was supposed to be in school." He made such a favorable impression with his knowledge and devotion to work that CGC management assigned him to take charge of a subsidiary company, a declining utility in Wisconsin. By the age of 20, he held the title of Chief Engineer at CGC.

In June 1899, the Emerson McMillan & Company, a financial company that invested in utility companies, had sent one of its senior executives, George T. Thompson, to the Denver Gas & Electric Company (a predecessor of the Public Service Company of Colorado) as president. Thompson died on October 1, 1900; McMillan asked Doherty to replace Thompson. On October 18, Doherty became acting president and treasurer of the Denver Gas & Electric Company.

In 1905, he started Henry L. Doherty & Co., which provided technical and financial consulting services to utility companies. In 1910, he founded his own holding company, Cities Service, which held the stock of energy companies (Note: petroleum, natural gas, and electric utilities) he had bought previously. Cities Service bought the holdings of Theodore N. Barnsdall, founder of Barnsdall Oil Company, in 1912.

In 1916, he established the Doherty Energy Research Laboratory Co. (DORELCO) in Bartlesville, Oklahoma, to advance his theories about field unitization as a means of oil conservation and as a location to train petroleum geologists and engineers. He received numerous awards and recognition for his contributions to the development of scientific methodology in the petroleum industry. In 1924, he instigated the creation of the Federal Oil Conservation Board by President Coolidge.

Doherty was awarded the Franklin Institute's Walton Clark Medal in 1931. In 1969, Columbia University added his name to the Lamont–Doherty Earth Observatory, after the Henry L. and Grace Doherty Charitable Foundation made a large contribution.

Doherty eventually had controlling interests in 150 firms, which collectively served 9,000 locales in the U.S. and Canada, with a cumulative 600,000 stockholders. The Public Utility Holding Company Act of 1935 (PUHCA) required that a company like Cities Service divest itself of either its electric utility holdings or its other energy companies. Cities Service chose to sell off its utilities and remain in the oil and gas business. The first steps to liquidate investments in its public utilities were taken in 1943 and affected over 250 different utility corporations.

== Personal life ==
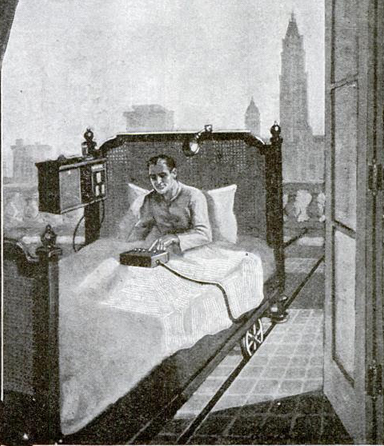
Doherty's motorized bed

Before founding Cities Service, Henry Doherty moved to New York City, where he lived atop an office building at State and Liberty Streets, now the site of 1 Battery Park Plaza. The suite had a gym, squash court and motorized bed that slid out onto the terrace. Clearly, he was already beset with recurring rounds of arthritis. He nearly died in 1927 from complications of the disease, but recovered with the help of a friend, Grace Eames. Grace was a widow, and married Henry in December 1928. A New York Times article said that he had bought several properties in Manhattan for redevelopment, but most of the projects were delayed because of these bouts.

One of the projects completed for Doherty was a 60-story skyscraper initially named for its street address, 70 Pine Street, Lower Manhattan, New York. (Note: Later it was known informally as the Cities Service Building. American International Group bought the building in 1979 to serve as its headquarters.) It was topped by a tower containing six smaller floors that would contain Doherty's private residence.

The Lamont–Doherty Earth Observatory received a substantial donation of his estate.

== See also ==
- Citgo
- Public Utility Holding Company Act of 1935
