= Burl S. Watson =

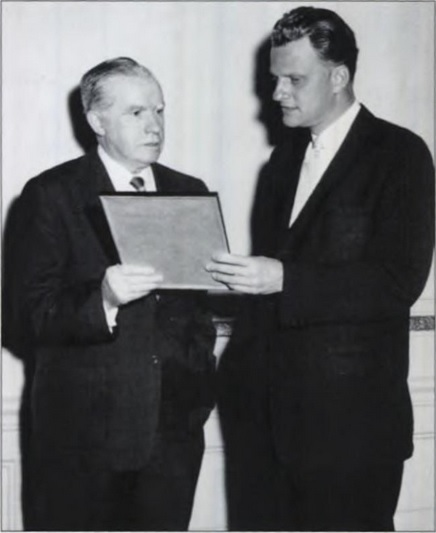
Burl S. Watson Sr., inducting Reverend Billy Graham into the New York Southern Society

Burl Stevens Watson Sr. (7 November 1893 – 16 August 1975) was the president and CEO of Cities Service Company during parts of the 1950s and 1960s. He became president in 1954 and was chairman of the board and CEO beginning in 1962, taking the place of W. Alton Jones, who died in the crash of American Airlines Flight 1. Watson was extremely influential as the leader of one of the largest oil companies in the United States. He was quoted often in newspaper and magazine publications on his views on the status of the petroleum industry and served as a national leader of the American Red Cross and Salvation Army. Watson served for many years as the director of the American Petroleum Institute.

Born in the small town of Lincoln, Alabama, to farmer Byron Alexander Stephens Watson, he was the first graduate of Lincoln High School and went on to the University of Alabama, where he majored in electrical engineering. There is a scholarship in his name at Alabama to this day due to a donation he made to the university, which was later enhanced by Cities Service Company. He was awarded an honorary Doctorate of Science from the University of Alabama in 1957.

After serving in the Army Engineer Corps during World War I, he rose through the ranks of the large corporation, eventually moving to New York City and working at the corporate office.

He married Emitom Burns, daughter of state senator and agricultural innovator Robert Burns. They had two children, including Burl Stevens Watson Jr. who went on to become director of corporate finance of Cities Service Company. Burl Sr. had an oil tanker named after him, the Burl S. Watson, which was built at the Sörviksvarvet A/B shipyard at Uddevalla, Sweden, being released for duty in 1961. He died in 1975 in Port Washington, New York, at the age of 81.
