= Federal Oil Conservation Board =

Defunct U.S. government investigative board

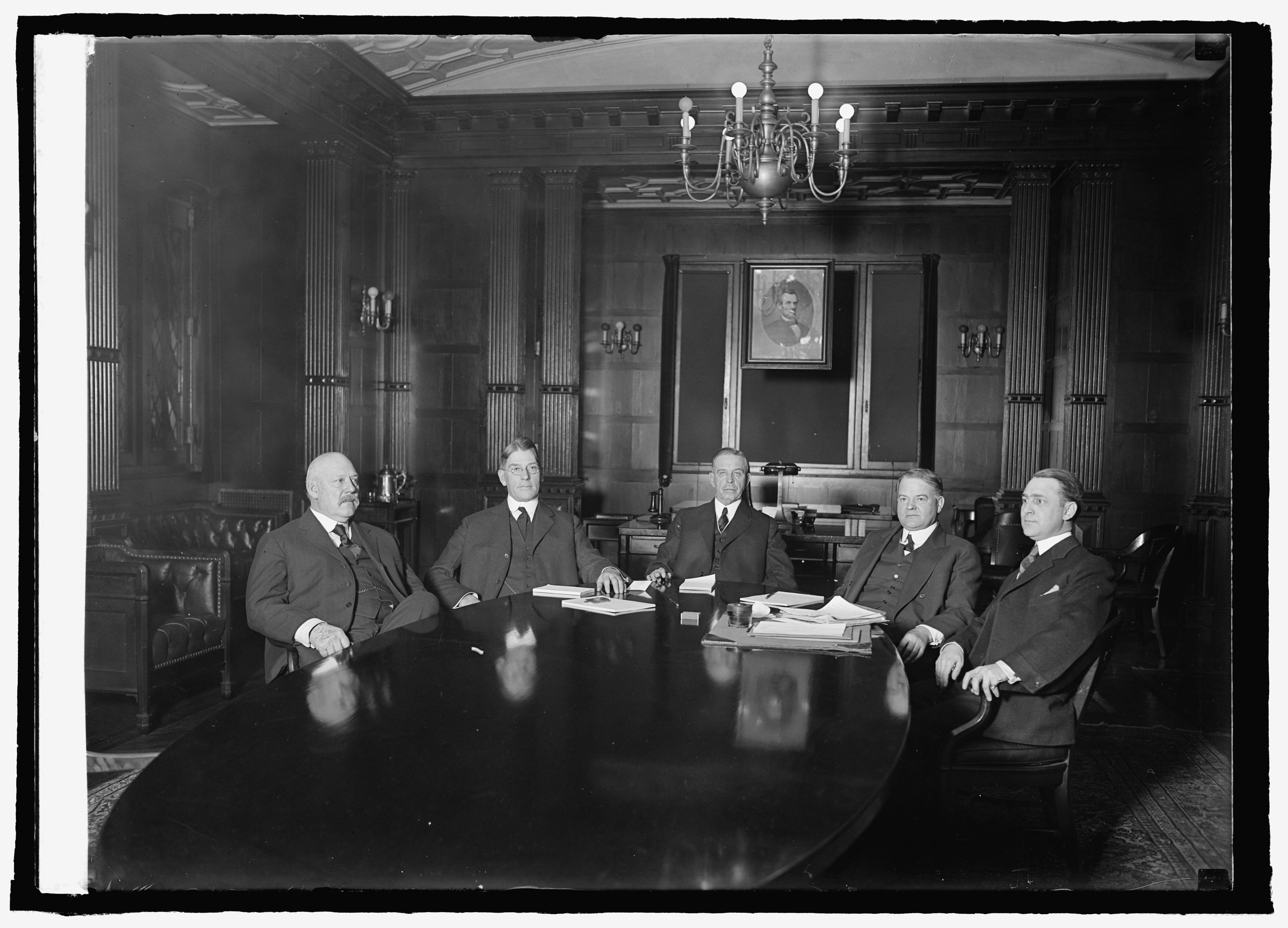
Members of the Federal Oil Conservation Board in 1925

The Federal Oil Conservation Board (FOCB) was created by United States president Calvin Coolidge in 1924 to investigate conditions in the oil industry. On its creation, the board consisted of the Secretary of War, Secretary of the Navy, Secretary of the Interior, and Secretary of Commerce. Oil industry executives filed a lawsuit through the American Petroleum Institute to prevent the board from having any enforcement power. It was superseded by the Petroleum Administrative Board in 1934.
