= List of Central Philippine University people =

The following is a partial list of notable Central Philippine University people. The list includes associated people of the university which includes alumni, professors, faculty members and other people who were conferred with honorary degrees which are known as Centralians. Notable people of the university include:

== Alumni and associated people ==
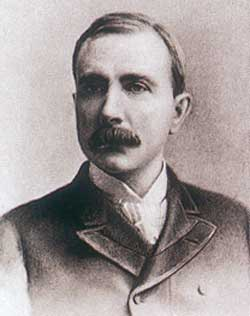
John D. Rockefeller, American philanthropist and business magnate.

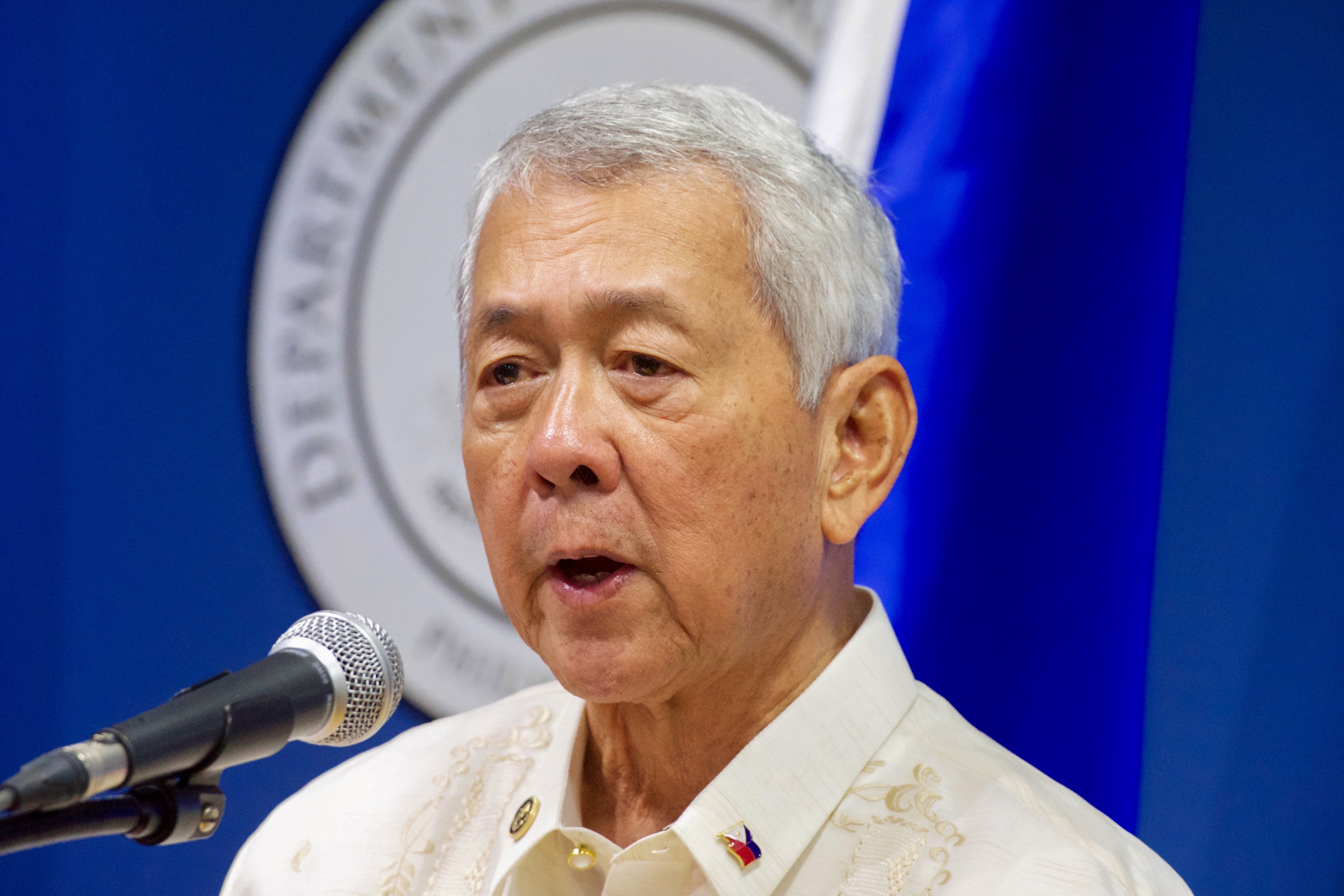
Perfecto Yasay Jr., Secretary of Foreign Affairs of the Philippines under Philippine President Rodrigo Duterte.

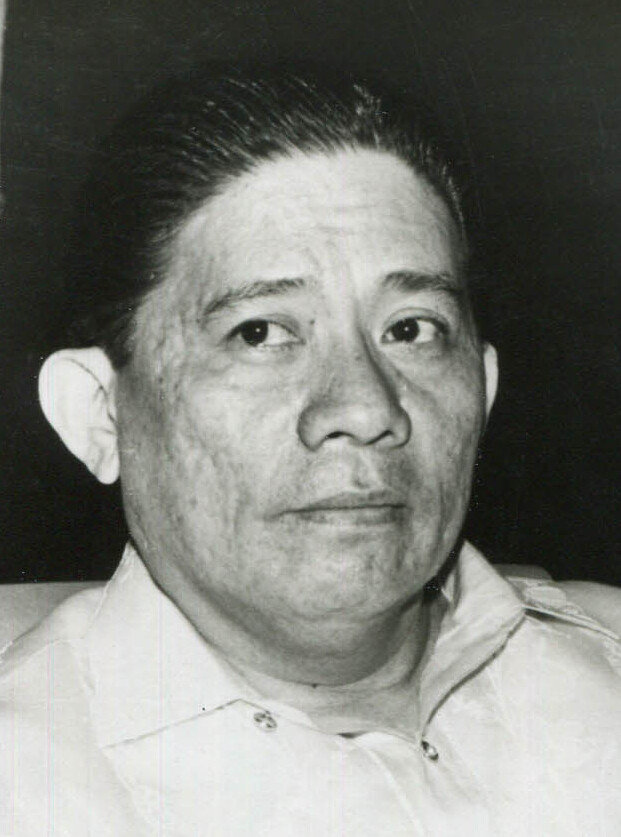
Rodolfo "Roding" Ganzon, Senator of the Philippines.

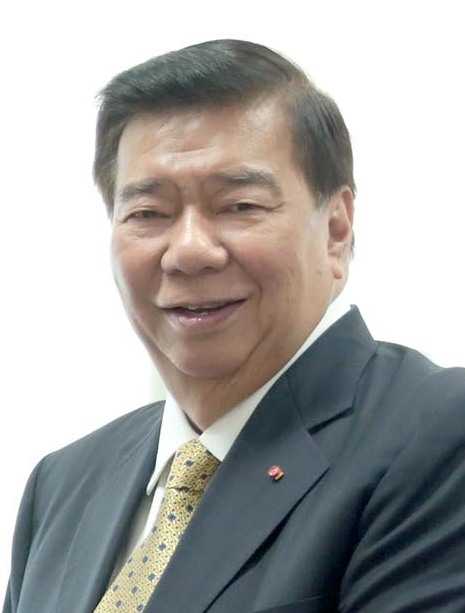
Franklin Drilon, Present Senator and Senate President of the Senate of the Philippines.

Name	Notability	Reference
Jose V. Aguilar	First Filipino recipient of the Ramon Magsaysay Award (Asian equivalent of Nobel Prize) for his work as the "Father of the Community School Movement" and served as consultant on Elementary education and later to the UNESCO Consultative Mission to the Philippines	
Leo Tito Ausan Jr.	Assistant Secretary for Legal Affairs of the Department of Foreign Affairs (Philippines) and former Philippine Consul General to Germany	
Alexis Belonio	Filipino inventor, engineer, scientist and the first Filipino Rolex Awards for Enterprise awardee. He was included also by the Rolex watchmaking company on its list of 10 model innovators in November 2008; one of the first seven modern day Filipino heroes awardees and recipient of the first ever Yahoo! Philippines Pitong Pinoy Awards in 2011	
Lejo Braña	first Filipino Certified Professional in Packaging; first Filipino and Asian to receive a prestigious award in the packaging community in the United States and worldwide of being elected to the US Packaging Hall of Fame.	
Ferjenel Biron	Former Iloilo fourth district congressman; author of cheaper medicines bill in the Philippines	
Hernan Biron	Iloilo fourth district representative (congressman)	
Leonor Briones	Former Presidential Adviser for Social Development with Secretary/Cabinet Rank, former National Treasurer of the Philippines and present Secretary of the Department of Education (Philippines).	
Nicasia Cada	One of the first three nurses who graduated from a nursing school in the Philippines	
Dorotea Caldito	One of the first three nurses who graduated from a nursing school in the Philippines	
Glenn Catedral	First Filipino Recipient of the American Field Service Scholarships in 1956	
Peter Irving C. Corvera	Present Department of the Interior and Local Government (DILG) – Philippines Undersecretary for Public Safety and Presidential Medal of Merit (Philippines) awardee).	
Rodolfo Ganzon	first popularly elected City Mayor of Iloilo and Senator of the Philippines	
Felipa De la Pena (Gumabong)	One of the first three nurses who graduated from a nursing school in the Philippines	
Arthur Defensor, Sr.	Present governor of Iloilo Province	
Hansel Didulo	Assistant Secretary of Department of Agriculture (Philippines)	
Franklin Drilon	Senator and Present Senate President of the Philippines	
Katchry Jewel Golbin (Alienette Coldfire)	Third place winner of the 11th season of La France a un incroyable talent (France Got Talent)	
Hope V. Hervilla	Assistant Secretary of the Department of Social Welfare and Development	
Enrique Zaldivar	former congressman and Philippine Ambassador to Brunei.	
Edgar T. Espinosa Jr.	Former Congressman from Guimaras	
Danny Fajardo	President, editor, and founder of the Philippine renowned and leading newspaper Panay News	
Daisy Avance-Fuentes	Former congresswoman and present governor of South Cotabato	
Maria Daziella Gange	Filipina beauty pageant, second winner of the Miss Filipinas Heritage and the second representative of the Philippines to the international pageant search Miss Heritage. She is also hailed as the first winner of the Miss Filipinas Heritage who came from Visayas and Mindanao.	
Otoniel Gonzaga	Internationally known music virtuoso and tenor singer.	
Leonor Orosa-Goquingco	Philippine National Artist in Dance, Mother of Philippine Theater Dance and Dean of Filipino Performing Arts Critics; first Filipina and the only dancer sent on the first-ever cultural mission to Japan (1939) and the first Philippine folkloric ballerina or ballet dancer	
Richard S. Garin	Iloilo first district congressman and former Vice-governor of Iloilo Province	
Ramona Palabrica Go	United Nations Consul General and the Philippines first female army general in the history of the Armed Forces of the Philippines	
Jovelyn Gonzaga	Team captain and member of the Philippines women's national volleyball team who battled in the 2015 Southeast Asian Games in Singapore; member of the Philippine Army Lady Troopers and was named in 2013 as the Shakey's V-League Open Conference Most Valuable Player	
Eliza U. Griño	The first exchange professor sent to China by the Philippine Government to teach English to university students	
Benigno Hinolan	writer of the first biography article of the Philippine national hero Graciano López Jaena in 1923	
Felipe Landa Jocano	historian and dubbed as the first and foremost Filipino Anthropologist	
Gilopez Kabayao	Renowned musician (international violin virtuoso); patriarch and member of the musical family, The Kabayaos in the Philippines; Ramon Magsaysay Award awardee	
Guillermina Kilayko	Female athlete and was acclaimed as the"No. 1 Best Softball Catcher" in 1960s in the country	
Gregorio Licaros	fourth Governor of the Central Bank of the Philippines.	
Ferdinand Marcos	10th President of the Philippines.	
Rosendo Mejica	Renowned Ilonggo and Visayan journalist, educator, and labor leader; considered as the Dean of Visayan Journalists and also established the longest Ilonggo existing newspaper in 1913, the Hiligaynon	
Genera Elvegia Ruiz Mendoza	first woman Nurse General and Brigadier of the Armed Forces of the Philippines; Florence Nightingale Awardee from the International Red Cross	
Pablo Nava III	Congressman and represents the Append Partylist	
Alexander Pama	Retired Vice-Admiral of the Philippine Navy and Undersecretary of the National Disaster Risk Reduction and Management Council (NDRRMC) of the Philippines.	
Custodio Parcon Jr.	Philippine Navy Lieutenant Colonel and one of less than 20 graduates of the Philippine Military Academy to have awarded the prestigious Philippine Medal of Valor by the President of the Philippines	
Salvacion Z. Perez	Former Governor of Antique Province and congresswoman candidate	
Reynato Puno	Chief Justice, Supreme Court of the Philippines	
Claro M. Recto	former Filipino senator.	
Isabelo de los Reyes Jr.	fourth Supreme Bishop of the Philippine Independent Church, known as the "Father of Ecumenism in the Philippines".	
Pedro E.Y. Rio	The first Filipino Doctor of Education degree holder	
John D. Rockefeller	American business magnate and philanthropist; founder of the Standard Oil Company (which dominated the oil industry and the first great business trust in the United States), the Rockefeller Foundation, and the one who gave a grant in 1901 to the Northern Baptist Churches to establish Central; regarded as the richest person in US history	
Estrellita B. Suansing	Nueva Ecija 1st District congresswoman.	
Lucio C. Tan	Chinese Filipino business tycoon	
Hector Tarrazona	Former colonel of the Philippine Air Force; founding member of the Reform the Armed Forces Movement; 2010 senatorial candidate under Ang Kapatiran Party, and consultant/chief of the Airmen Examination Board at the Civil Aviation Authority of the Philippines	
Nielex Tupas	National Youth Commission Executive Director and Chief Operating Officer	
Loreto D. Tupaz	Considered as the one who pioneered the modern Nursing; Florence Nightingale of the Philippines	
Alfonso A. Uy	Chinese-Filipino businessman; former and first President of Federation of Filipino Chinese Chambers of Commerce & Industry who came from the Visayas and Mindanao; recipient and awardee of the Dr. Jose Rizal Award for Excellence in Business and Commerce	
Spicy Morena Louise Aurelio Vail	Former Filipina woman beauty pageant and the first Binibining Pilipinas winner to place as a semi-finalist (top 15) in the Miss Universe pageant in 1965; (she is also included in the magic five of the said pageant (Miss Universe) in the said year also (1965))	
Rene C(artera) Villa	former acting chairman of Local Water Utilities Administration of the Philippines	
Perfecto R. Yasay, Jr.	Secretary of Foreign Affairs (Philippines) and former SEC chairman of the Philippines (1995–2000) and 2010 Philippine Vice-Presidential candidate; the first public official who stood up against a President of the Philippines on the issue of corruption and abuse of power and EDSA People Freedom Awardee.	
Calixto Zaldivar	Former Associate Justice of the Supreme Court of the Philippines. But later than that he also became a Congressman, Governor of Antique province and executive secretary of the President of the Philippines.	
Enrique Zaldivar	Former congressman and Philippine Ambassador to Brunei.	

== Presidents of Central ==
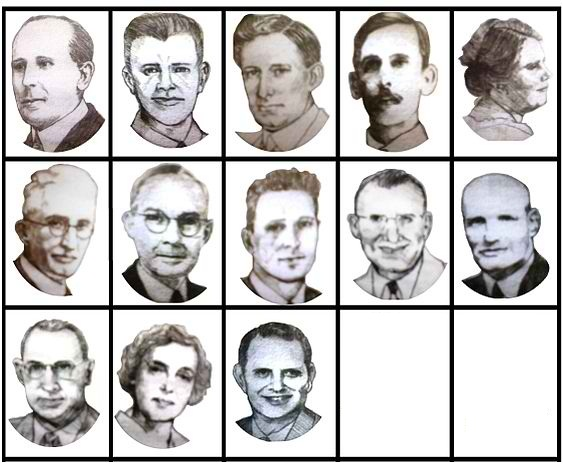
Heads of Central Philippine University (which are all Americans) from its founding until 1966 when Rex D. Drilon, became the first Filipino president.

Name	Tenure	Alma mater	Reference
William Valentine, D.D.	1905–1906; 1907–1914	Colgate University and University of Chicago	
Charles L. Maxfield, D.D.	1906–1907		
Francis H(oward) Rose	1914–1916; 1938–1941		
Henry W. Munger	1916–1917		
Mary J. Thomas	1917–1918		
Alton E. Bigelow	1918–1922		
Harland F. Stuart	1922–1938		
R. Fred Chambers	1941–1942		
J. Morris Forbes	1947–1950		
Almus O(liver) Larsen	1950–1952		
Peter H. J. Lerrigo	1952–1956;1957–1961		
Linnea A. Nelson	1956–1957;1965–1966	University of California Berkeley	
Joseph T(urner) Howard	1961–1965		
Rex A. Drilon	1966–1971	University of the Philippines Diliman	
Agustin A. Pulido, Ph.D.	1971–1996	Silliman University and Indiana University	
Juanito M. Acanto, Ph.D.	1996–2008	University of the Philippines Visayas and International University of Missouri	
Teodoro C. Robles, Ph.D.	2008–2023	Montana State University	
Ernest Howard B. Dagohoy D.Min., M.Div.	2023-Present	Central Philippine University	
