= The W. Alton Jones Cell Science Center =

US research center

- Founder: W. Alton Jones
- Established: 1971
- Location: Lake Placid, New York

The W. Alton Jones Cell Science Center (1971–1995) was a non-profit research and education center on 10 Old Barn Road in Lake Placid, New York. The Center was established by a gift of 34 acres (14 ha) of land and $3 million to the Tissue Culture Association from the W. Alton Jones Foundation through efforts of Nettie Marie Jones, widow of W. Alton Jones, who was former chairman of the Board of Cities Service Company (see Citgo). The original tax-free gift was accompanied by the institutional charter that use of the facility would be restricted forever to non-profit activities related to research and education on the biology of cells.

== Cell Culture Research and Education Center 1971-1982 ==
The Cell Center was largely the vision of cell culture pioneer Dr. George Otto Gey, director of the Finney-Howell Cancer Research Laboratory at the Johns Hopkins Hospital, a founder and first President of The Tissue Culture Association (now the Society for In Vitro Biology). Dr. Gey was introduced to Nettie Marie Jones, widow of W. Alton Jones, through her daughter Patricia Jones, an employee or acquaintance at Johns Hopkins. A highlight of the W. Alton Jones Cell Science Center building was the George and Margaret Gey Library. The objective was to provide a center in the peaceful setting of the Adirondack Mountains where experts in the fields of genetics, immunology, virology, insect physiology and other invertebrates unified by common interest in the art and science of culturing cells outside the body could come together, pool their ideas and techniques, and convey them to others.

In the period 1971 to 1980, the Cell Center consisted of research groups oriented around the theme of cell and tissue culture, provided specialty 1- to 3-week courses and hosted international meetings on the theme. The first Director was Dr. Donald Merchant, followed by Dr. Paul Chapple.

For the period 1971 through 1979 the W. Alton Jones Foundation contributed annually to the operating expenses and mission of the Cell Center through the influence of Nettie Marie Jones. In 1979, Mrs. Jones was in poor health and nearing age 100. At that time Charlottesville, Virginia-based daughter of Mrs. Jones, Patricia Jones Edgerton, took charge of the W. Alton Jones Foundation and together with longtime family associate William C. Battle, ambassador to Australia under the Kennedy administration, established an independent corporation called the W. Alton Jones Cell Science Center, Inc. Edgerton and Battle and associates maintained concurrent control of the W. Alton Jones Foundation and the W. Alton Jones Cell Science Center, Inc.

In the early 1980s, the Tissue Culture Association, subsequently the Society for In Vitro Biology (SIVB), under President Keith R. Porter, was pressured to relinquish deed to the Cell Center property and facility originally donated to them tax-free by the W. Alton Jones Foundation to the newly established W. Alton Jones Cell Science Center, Inc. Without sufficient resources to support legal action to retain ownership of the property and enforce the original non-profit charter and mission, the deed was relinquished. Subsequently the SIVB agreed retroactively to relinquish enforcement of the "non-profit use only" stipulation of the original charter along with the earlier transfer of the deed to the property for a donation of $50,000 from the Adirondack Biomedical Institute, Inc. (Director, Dr. James Stevens).

== The Sato Program 1983-1993 ==
In 1982 the W. Alton Jones Foundation donated $17.5 million to the W. Alton Jones Cell Science Center, Inc. of to support the recruitment and program of Dr. Gordon H. Sato as Director. Dr. Sato's mission was to build a financially independent world-class basic research and teaching institute in the Adirondack Mountains generally oriented around the applications of cell culture technologies to broad problems in human health and disease through translational biotechnology to industry and the clinic. In his own words he envisioned "a self-endowed Rockefeller University-type institution" in the middle of the Adirondack Park, New York's statewide counterpart of New York City's Central Park.

In the period 1983-1993 the research staff of the Center increased by 10 fold. Sato purchased several local properties for staff and student housing. He established an international Ph.D. program in Chemical Biology with nearby Clarkson University, Potsdam (village), New York and a joint program with the University of Vermont, Burlington, Vermont. He established the annual W. Alton Jones International Symposium in Cellular Endocrinology centered on honoring movers and shakers in the field. During his administration the Center acquired program project grants from the National Cancer Institute and National Institute of Diabetes and Digestive and Kidney Diseases. Through Sato's efforts, the Cell Center acquired worldwide recognition through contributions of its researchers to basic research and biotechnological applications. Its former researchers and students hold leadership positions in academics and biotechnology worldwide. During this period the Lake Placid center became the headquarters of The Manzanar Project, a global action project aimed at attacking the planet's most critical problems as poverty, hunger, environmental pollution, and global warming through low tech biotechnological methods in salt water deserts that can be transferred to the indigenous inhabitants

To ensure financial independence, a permanent endowment for the research center, "to give scientists security and remove any temptation they may have felt to modify their research because of monetary support," Sato founded Upstate Biotechnology, Inc. (UBI) to be solely owned by the W. Alton Jones Cell Science Center, Inc. Startup for UBI was financed by loans from the W. Alton Jones Cell Science Center, Inc. from the $17.5 million gift from the W. Alton Jones Foundation to ensure that ownership and proceeds of UBI flowed solely into support and long term endowment of the Cell Center without interference by private interests. As profitability of UBI increased, private interests and the controlling overlapping members of the Boards of both the for-profit UBI, the non-profit W. Alton Jones Cell Science Center, Inc. and the non-profit W. Alton Jones Foundation and their associates diverted the UBI mission away from the goal of providing permanent support and endowment of the Cell Center in its Lake Placid, New York location in the Adirondack Mountains. This precipitated the resignation of Dr. Sato as Director.

== Diversion of Upstate Biotechnology, Inc. and dissolution ==
In 1996 Edgerton and Battle and associates recruited venture capitalist Sheridan Snyder to become involved with UBI, later called Upstate USA, Inc., Upstate Group or simply Upstate. In 1996 the not-for-profit W. Alton Jones Cell Science Center, Inc. was dissolved and the assets, which included Upstate Biotechnology, Inc., were transferred to a newly incorporated non-for-profit entity, the Adirondack Biomedical Research Institute (ABRI), Inc. In 1998 the ABRI ceased operations as a non-profit basic research entity and announced the facility would become an "incubator facility" for biotechnology companies in the Adirondack Mountains region with Upstate, Inc. and Argonex (a Snyder startup) as lead companies.

In 2000, the ABRI corporation was dissolved and the property and facilities purchased by for-profit Upstate, Inc. of which Argonex was a major shareholder for $1 million. In 2004 Upstate was sold to Serologicals, Inc. for $204 million. Upstate and Serologicals, Inc. are now a division of Millipore Corporation. The site was offered for sale on the Lake Placid real estate market by Millipore Corporation for $5.9 million and was reportedly sold in 2007 to a local partnership of Lake Placid real estate and business investors for about $3 million.

In 2000 the Ivy Foundation chaired by William C. Battle was established with a reported endowment of $7 million from funds from the closure of the Adirondack Biomedical Research Foundation, Inc. (formerly the W. Alton Jones Cell Science Center, Inc.) that included Upstate Biotechnology, Inc. Subsequent to the sale of the Upstate Group in 2005 the Ivy Foundation, listing Board of Directors as William C. Battle, Arthur Garson, Jr., William Black, Sheridan Snyder, Patricia J. Edgerton, Aaron Shatkin and Dr. Robert W. Battle, made a gift of $45 million to the University of Virginia, Charlottesville, Virginia, the largest single gift in the history of the University.

Just after the establishment of the Ivy Foundation, but prior to the sale of the privately held Upstate Biotechnology, Inc. to Serologicals, Inc., the Charlottesville, Virginia-based 56-year-old W. Alton Jones Foundation suddenly dissolved in 2001. The $400 million endowment was split into three separate foundations, the Blue Moon Fund run by Patricia Jones Edgerton (daughter of W. Alton Jones) and her daughter Diane Edgerton Miller, the Oak Hill Foundation run by son William Edgerton, and the Edgerton Foundation run by son Brad Edgerton.
