= List of Come Outside episodes =

The following is a list of episodes for the children's television series, Come Outside. This list is ordered by the original air dates on BBC channels in the United Kingdom.

== Series overview ==
Series	Episodes	Originally released	
Series	Episodes	First released	Last released
1	11	23 September 1993	2 December 1993
2	19	22 September 1994	9 March 1995
3	10	7 January 1997	18 March 1997

== Episodes ==
=== Series 1 (1993) ===
No. overall	No. in series	Title	Directed by	Written by	Original release date
1	1	"Hedgehogs"	Elizabeth Bennett	Elizabeth Bennett	23 September 1993
It is night time at Auntie Mabel's house. She and her dog Pippin search the garden for Spikey the hedgehog, who is a regular visitor. Auntie Mabel remembers the day when Spikey broke his leg and she flew him in her aeroplane, Spotty Plane, to St. Tiggywinkle's Wildlife Hospital. She saw many other sick animals at the hospital. Spikey soon recovered and was returned to Auntie Mabel's garden. Auntie Mabel is about to go to bed when she spots Spikey enjoying a meal of Pippin's favourite dog food. With thanks to: St. Tiggywinkle's Wildlife Hospital Trust Colour coat Auntie Mabel took: Green
2	2	"Snails"	Elizabeth Bennett	Elizabeth Bennett	30 September 1993
Pippin is making too much mess indoors and Auntie Mabel decides she must move into a kennel in the garden. Pippin is not keen, even when her friend Danny the dog pays a visit. Auntie Mabel finds a snail on the garden path and compares the size of its 'house' (its shell) with Pippin's kennel, and also her own house. She and Pippin fly to London Zoo to see the giant snails. When they return, Pippin is sent to her kennel for the night. Auntie Mabel recites some verses from The Four Friends by A. A. Milne and then changes her mind and lets Pippin back into the house. With thanks to: London Zoo Colour coat Auntie Mabel took: Green
3	3	"A Windy Day"	Elizabeth Bennett	Elizabeth Bennett	7 October 1993
Auntie Mabel is getting ready to go to a party. She hangs up her washing on the line to dry in the wind, including her best red blouse. While Pippin is playing in the garden, a strong gust of wind blows the red blouse off the washing line. Pippin notices and goes and chases after it. Meanwhile, Auntie Mabel is doing her hair ready for the upcoming party. She tells Aesop's fable about the North Wind and the Sun. When she discovers both Pippin and her blouse are missing, she takes off in her aeroplane to look for them. Pippin has caught the blouse in a far away field and Auntie Mabel takes them both home again. But now her hair is in a mess, her blouse is dirty and Pippin has fallen fast asleep, tired out after her long chase for the blouse. Colour coat Auntie Mabel took: none
4	4	"Water"	Elizabeth Bennett	Elizabeth Bennett	14 October 1993
It's Pippin's bath day, but she doesn't like having a bath and so she's hiding in the cupboard. Auntie Mabel is filling the bath when she hears water gushing outside. A pipe under the street is leaking. Auntie Mabel phones the water company and while they repair the pipe, she and Pippin visit the river, where their water comes from, and where it begins its journey through cleansing and purifying processes, ending up at Auntie Mabel's kitchen tap. She tells Aesop's fable 'The Crow and the Pitcher'. The leaking pipe is mended and now Pippin can have her bath, to which she tries hiding again. Colour coat Auntie Mabel took: Green With thanks to: Three Valleys Water Services
5	5	"A Rainy Day"	Elizabeth Bennett	Elizabeth Bennett	21 October 1993
Auntie Mabel and Pippin fly home from a sunny day out at the seaside to find it pouring with rain as they get close to landing. As she unloads the plane, Auntie Mabel falls in a puddle, just like 'Doctor Foster'. She is glad she fixed new guttering to her house, until a piece falls off and she has to repair it. Auntie Mabel sings "Incy Wincy Spider" and tells the story of 'Tiddalick the Frog', while Pippin enjoys herself running about in the rain. Colour coat Auntie Mabel took: None
6	6	"Wood"	Elizabeth Bennett	Elizabeth Bennett	28 October 1993
Today, Auntie Mabel will give some children a music lesson using wooden musical instruments. She uses wooden kitchen utensils to make some jam tarts for the children. Pippin wants a jam tart but Auntie Mabel tells her they are not good for dogs. Auntie Mabel finds many things made of wood in her kitchen and living room. She recites 'The table and the chair' by Edward Lear and recalls the day she and Pippin went for a walk in the woods. They saw a tree being felled, visited a factory where wooden furniture is made and bought a wooden chair. The children arrive for their music lesson and while they're not looking Pippin steals a jam tart. Colour coat Auntie Mabel took: Green With thanks to: Ercol Furniture
7	7	"Paper"	Elizabeth Bennett	Elizabeth Bennett	4 November 1993
Pippin has been to the newsagent to collect Auntie Mabel's daily newspaper. She brings it home but won't let go of it. She carries it around with her all day, even when they fly off in Spotty Plane to visit a forest. They see a tree being cut down and travel with it to a paper factory where they find out how newspaper is made. Pippin misbehaves and loses Auntie Mabel's newspaper in a heap of papers and magazines waiting to be recycled. When they get home, the newspaper Pippin is carrying is not the one Auntie Mabel was expecting to read. With thanks to: Shotton Paper Company Colour coat Auntie Mabel took: Green
8	8	"Clay"	Elizabeth Bennett	Elizabeth Bennett	11 November 1993
Auntie Mabel receives a new brown teapot as a birthday present from her nephew Jay who is coming for tea. When Pippin accidentally breaks it, they hurry to the shop to buy a replacement before the day Jay arrives. But the shop has run out of brown teapots. So they fly to the pottery factory, visit a clay quarry and watch a teapot being made on a potter's wheel. Eventually, they return home with their new brown teapot. The next day when Jay arrives for tea, Pippin gets over excited and knocks over the new teapot. However, Auntie Mabel luckily catches it just in time. With thanks to: Price and Kensington, Kevin Millward, WBB Devon Clays Colour coat Auntie Mabel took: Green
9	9	"Rubbish"	Elizabeth Bennett	Elizabeth Bennett	18 November 1993
Auntie Mabel is sorting her rubbish while Pippin is busy picking up litter and putting it in the dustbin. The refuse collection vehicle arrives but Pippin misses it and chases after it with a piece of litter. Auntie Mabel takes some of her rubbish to the paper, can and bottle banks, and we see how new milk bottles are made from old recycled glass bottles. Some of Auntie's old plastic containers and cardboard boxes are going to a local school where they use them to make models. Her vegetable peelings go on the compost. Meanwhile, Pippin is lost. Auntie Mabel flies in Spotty Plane to the rubbish tip to look for her. It's the end of the day by the time Pippin arrives at the tip but Auntie Mabel has gone home. When Auntie Mabel comes back to the tip to look for her again, the two are reunited and return home. Colour coat Auntie Mabel took: Green With thanks to: Leigh Environmental, Rockware Glass, T.W. Berryman
10	10	"Holes in the Ground"	Elizabeth Bennett	Elizabeth Bennett	25 November 1993
Auntie Mabel digs a hole in her garden and plants a tree. She and Pippin watch men from the telephone company working in a hole in the street to lay new cables under the street. They fly to Wookey Hole caves, where they see stalagmites, the witch of Wookey Hole and her dog, and water from an underground river. Auntie Mabel tells her version of Aesop's fable "The fox and the goat", in which the fox is trapped in a hole in the ground but tricks the goat into helping him out. Pippin falls into a hole in the road and Auntie Mabel rescues her, with her plant falling down again. Colour coat Auntie Mabel took: Green With thanks to: British Telecom, Wookey Hole Caves
11	11	"Bread"	Elizabeth Bennett	Elizabeth Bennett	2 December 1993
Auntie Mabel has run out of bread so she and Pippin go on a journey in their Spotty Plane to buy some more and find out where bread comes from. They visit a wheat field (in which Pippin decides to hide in various places and Auntie Mable has to chase after her), a flour mill and a bakery where the loaves are made. Auntie Mabel sings a song about the many different kinds of bread for sale in the shops. She chooses a loaf (a large white Bloomer) and takes it home. She tells the story of the Little Red Hen who couldn't persuade any of the animals on the farm to help her grow some wheat, cut and thresh it, take it to the mill to be ground into flour, or make the bread. So she did it all by herself. When the bread was ready to eat, they all wanted to help her eat it. But she ate it by herself since none of the others had helped her make it in the first place. Auntie Mable then has a slice from her new loaf with her breakfast and gives a piece to Pippin, who was still hungry. Colour coat Auntie Mabel took: Green With thanks to: Safeway

=== Series 2 (1994–95) ===
No. overall	No. in series	Title	Directed by	Written by	Original release date
12	1	"Geese"	Barbara Roddam	Elizabeth Bennett	22 September 1994
Pippin wakes up one morning and is frightened when she finds two geese swimming in the pond in Auntie Mabel's back garden. Auntie Mabel tells Pipin that geese won't hurt her as long as she gives them some space and they watch the two geese swim and dive in the pond for a small bit. Afterwards, they then fly in Spotty Plane to Folly Farm where there are many different kinds of geese and some goslings (and also some ducks). They get home just in time to see the geese fly away. Auntie Mabel gives Pippin a new cushion filled with goose feathers but when Pippin wants to play with it, the cushion splits open and feathers fly everywhere. With thanks to: Folly Farm
13	2	"Boots"	Barbara Roddam	Elizabeth Bennett	29 September 1994
Auntie Mabel and Pippin have been out for a walk and they got caught in the rain. Auntie Mabel's Wellington boots have holes in them and her feet are wet. They fly in Spotty Plane to the shoe shop in the High Street but Auntie Mabel is dismayed to find they have sold out of boots in her size. So they fly on to The Gates Rubber Company, a factory where they watch Wellington boots being made. The factory makes boots for the Queen. There, Auntie Mabel shows us how the rubber is pressed flat. A lining is glued on. The rubber is formed into the shape of a boot and soles and heels are added. Auntie Mabel buys a new pair. She tells the story of Martha the firefighter who couldn't get her boots off until everyone came to help. Pippin made Mabel's sock wet after she chases a cat. With thanks to: British Shoe Corporation, Gates Rubber Company Ltd.
14	3	"Spiders"	Barbara Roddam	Elizabeth Bennett	6 October 1994
It's Pippin's bath day and so she is hiding in the cupboard. Auntie Mabel is about to run the bath when she sees a spider. She lifts it out of the bath. counts its legs and shows how it can spin a thread and hang from it. A spider is seen spinning a web to catch an insect. Auntie Mabel and Pippin fly in Spotty Plane to Peter's house and visit some big spiders in his collection, including a tarantula, and their spiderlings. When they get home, it's time for Pippin's bath, but Auntie Mabel has to catch her first. After that, Pippin finally takes her bath reluctantly. Spiders supplied by: Peter Kirk
15	4	"Buses"	Barbara Roddam	Elizabeth Bennett	13 October 1994
Auntie Mabel has to return some books to the library before it shuts. She and Pippin climb into Spotty Plane but it won't start and so they have to go on the bus. Auntie Mabel is in such a hurry that she leaves Pippin asleep on the bus by mistake. Pippin ends up at the bus depot where she helps the bus driver look for lost property and sees a bus being washed and filled with fuel. Auntie Mabel discovers her plane wouldn't start because its tank was empty and Pippin gets a special ride home on the bus. Bus driver: Ashok Srivastava; With thanks to: CentreWest London Buses Ltd. Children from: Rabbsfarm Primary School
16	5	"Apples"	Peter Rose	Elizabeth Bennett	20 October 1994
Auntie Mabel and Pippin visit an apple orchard in Kent where Cox's Orange Pippins are growing. They help with the harvesting, watch the apples being sorted and get a ride with the apples to market where they are bought by a shop owner. They go to the shop where the apples are put on display and Auntie Mabel buys some of them for a fruit salad. With thanks to: A.V. Breach, George Perry Ltd, Staplehurst Transits, Birmingham City Council
17	6	"Cleaning"	Barbara Roddam	Elizabeth Bennett	27 October 1994
It is Pippin's second birthday! Auntie Mabel is cleaning the house and washing her kitchen floor ready for Pippin's Birthday party. She takes her laundry to the launderette where Pippin helps with the washing while Auntie Mabel takes her best dress to be dry cleaned. Pippin's friends and relations arrive for the party and sing 'Happy Birthday'. Auntie Mabel is about to bring out a tray of sausages and a fruit and cream flan when Pippin chases her friend Danny round the kitchen, trips up Auntie Mabel and the sausages go all over the clean floor and the flan goes down her best dress. Though annoyed by this at first, Auntie Mabel forgives Pippin and gives her a dropped sausage.
18	7	"Sewage"	Peter Rose	Elizabeth Bennett	3 November 1994
Auntie Mabel and Pippin are buying some tricks for a children's party, including a fake poo made of plastic. When they get home, Auntie Mabel notices Pippin has made a poo on the path outside her front door. She cleans it up and puts it down the lavatory. She decides to find out where the dirty water goes and explores an underground sewer. Auntie Mabel and Pippin fly in Spotty Plane to visit a sewage treatment plant. They see how water is cleaned and returned to the river and how solid waste can be treated and used as fertilizer to be spread on fields. Back home again, Pippin tricks Auntie Mabel into thinking the fake poo is real. With thanks to: Thames Water Utilities Ltd
19	8	"A Woolly Jumper"	Barbara Roddam	Barbara Roddam	10 November 1994
Auntie Mabel is knitting a blue jumper for her sister Edie when she runs out of wool. She and Pippin go to the shop to buy some more, but they have sold out of blue wool. Auntie Mabel decides to begin at the very beginning. She and Pippin set off in Spotty Plane to find some sheep. They watch the sheep being shorn and find out how the wool is made. They visit a factory where the wool is dyed and at last Auntie Mabel finds the blue wool she needs to finish the jumper. Auntie Mabel's sister Edie arrives off-screen and in the excitment, Pippin pulls on the jumper and causes it to unravel everywhere. Shop assistant: Valerie Hunkins With thanks to: Sirdar plc
20	9	"Crisps"	Peter Rose	Elizabeth Bennett	17 November 1994
Auntie Mabel buys a packet of her favourite cheese and onion crisps and decides to find out where potato crisps come from. She and Pippin fly in Spotty Plane to the fields where potatoes are being harvested. Auntie Mabel describes the life cycle of the potato plant and Pippin helps to dig them up. They see the potatoes being sorted and then travel to the Golden Wonder crisp factory. Auntie Mabel watches the potatoes being washed sliced and cooked. She sees how the flavour is added and the crisps are sealed in air tight packets ready to be sold in the shops. When they get home, Auntie Mabel pops open her packet and says: "In the bin please Pippin" to throw the empty packet away. With thanks to: Golden Wonder
21	10	"Useful Holes"	Barbara Roddam	Barbara Roddam	24 November 1994
A mouse lives in a hole in Auntie Mabel's kitchen wall. She and Pippin fly in Spotty Plane to a wood to look for holes that are home to different animals. They find holes in tree trunks and in the ground which might be occupied by squirrels, woodpeckers and badgers. Auntie Mabel remembers the day when a hole in the back door saved her life. She had installed a dog flap for Pippin. One day she became trapped in her larder and her chip pan caught fire. Pippin got out through the dog flap and ran to fetch the fire brigade. The firemen arrived just in time to extinguish the fire and let Auntie Mabel out. With thanks to: London Fire Brigade
22	11	"A Letter"	Barbara Roddam	Barbara Roddam	1 December 1994
Auntie Mabel and Pippin have been to stay with their friend Dora. But Pippin gets bullied by Dora's big dog Gully and she leaves her little suitcase behind. When they get home. Auntie Mabel writes a letter to Dora. They take it to the Post Office and buy a stamp. Auntie Mabel decides to travel with the letter to see what happens to it. They watch letters being sorted, ride in a post van and on the night train. After a long journey, they end up with the letter back at Dora's and Pippin stands up to the big dog and finally retrieves her suitcase. With thanks to: The Post Office
23	12	"Toothpaste"	Barbara Roddam	Barbara Roddam	19 January 1995
Auntie Mabel brushes her teeth with some striped toothpaste because today is check up day at the dentist. Pippin is taken to the vet to have her teeth checked too. They go to a chemist to buy some more of Auntie Mabel's toothpaste and then visit the factory where the toothpaste is made and find out how they put in the stripes. With thanks to: SmithKline Beecham
24	13	"Stones"	Peter Rose	Elizabeth Bennett	26 January 1995
Auntie Mabel decides to build a rockery in her garden. She and Pippin fly off in their Spotty Plane in search of some stones. They visit a beach but the stones are too small for a rockery. So they go to a stone quarry where they see huge slabs of stone being dug out of the ground and watch the stone masons at work shaping pieces of stone which will be used to decorate the wall of a building. At the quarry, Auntie Mabel finds some pieces of stone just the right size for the rockery. At the same time, Auntie Mabel's amethyst ring falls off her finger but clever Pippin puts it in her bag and at the end, she finds it again. Quarry Foreman: Reginald Tsiboe With thanks to: Easton Masonry Co. (Portland) Ltd., Weymouth & Portland Borough Council
25	14	"A Carton Drink"	Barbara Roddam	Barbara Roddam	2 February 1995
Auntie Mabel prepares a picnic hamper and puts some sausages in Pippin's lunch box. They fly to the countryside in Spotty Plane looking for a good place to have their picnic. They come across a field of blackcurrants being harvested. Auntie Mabel decides to follow the blackcurrants to the factory where they are turned into blackcurrant juice and put into cartons. Auntie Mabel buys one to drink on the picnic. They are about to start their picnic when Auntie Mabel hears the sound of a woodpecker coming from the woods nearby. She and Pippin follow the sound and see the woodpecker. Auntie Mabel can't remember the way out of the woods but Pippin has left a trail of food and they follow it back to their picnic. With thanks to: Gerber Foods Manufacturing Ltd.
26	15	"Fish"	Peter Rose	Elizabeth Bennett	9 February 1995
A cat is after Auntie Mabel's goldfish, but she shoos it away. She and Pippin fly to the river in Spotty Plane where they feed and watch all sorts of freshwater fish. They meet a fisherman and his dog who catch a trout. Auntie Mabel tells the story of Bernard the stickleback who looked after all his brothers and sisters. When they return home, Auntie Mabel sees something in the cat's mouth. She thinks it's one of her goldfish but it turns out to be one of Pippin's sausages. With thanks to: Earl of Radnor and the Trustees of the Longford Estate
27	16	"Rabbits"	Peter Rose	Elizabeth Bennett	16 February 1995
Auntie Mabel is looking after her sister Edie's rabbit, Bobby. Pippin is sulking as Bobbie is getting all the attention. Bobby is staying in a hutch in the garden, with a fence round it. Auntie Mabel changes the straw in the hutch and Pippin begins to make friends with the rabbit. They fly to the countryside where they see some wild rabbits and visit some baby rabbits in a nature park. When they get home, Auntie Mabel feeds Bobby with a meal of dandelion and cabbage leaves. But she leaves the gate open and Bobby hops out of his enclosure and into the garden. Auntie Mabel tells the story 'Brer Rabbit and the Well'. She returns to the hutch to check on Bobby and is horrified to find him gone. But eventually she finds him curled up with Pippin in her basket. Rabbit handler: Maria Douglas
28	17	"Eggs"	Peter Rose	Elizabeth Bennett	23 February 1995
Auntie Mabel and Pippin collect some newly laid eggs from their hens. They look at pictures of different eggs then fly in Spotty Plane to an ostrich farm where they see an ostrich's nest containing some very large eggs. They watch an ostrich egg hatching and meet some baby ostriches. Auntie Mabel sings a song about identifying different kinds of eggs from different animals. When they return home, Auntie Mabel feeds her hens, but is distracted when the phone rings and leaves a gate open by mistake. Pippin spots a fox hiding in the bushes and quickly runs to fetch Auntie Mabel, who shoos away the fox and closes the gate just in time. With thanks to the: Hangland Farm
29	18	"Dandelions"	Barbara Roddam	Barbara Roddam	2 March 1995
Auntie Mabel finds some dandelions growing in her garden. She tells the story of how they came to be there. One day, she and Pippin had flown to the city for a day out. They saw tall buildings and busy streets full of traffic and people. In this urban environment, Auntie Mabel had been surprised to see a dandelion plant growing in a crack in the concrete. Pippin sneezed on the dandelion's seed head and some seeds landed on her coat. They travelled on Pippin's back all the way to Auntie Mabel's garden where they took root and grew into new dandelion plants.
30	19	"Boxes"	Peter Rose	Elizabeth Bennett	9 March 1995
Auntie Mabel is moving house and there are packing cases and boxes everywhere. Pippin is feeling sad, and Auntie Mabel gives her the key to their new house to look after. Pippin packs her little suitcase and Auntie Mabel packs her 'treasure chest' which has some special boxes in it – a Jack-in-the-box, a musical box and a jewellery box. Auntie Mabel tells the story 'The Magic Box' and Pippin hides in the back of the removal van. By the time the van is ready to leave, Auntie Mabel can't find Pippin anywhere. She spends a long time looking for her then flies in Spotty Plane to her new house to tell the removal men what has happened. But by the time she arrives, they have found Pippin with the key and have unloaded all the furniture. Removal man: Ismail Taylor Kamara

=== Series 3 (1997) ===
No. overall	No. in series	Title	Directed by	Written by	Original release date
31	1	"Bricks"	Elizabeth Bennett	Elizabeth Bennett	7 January 1997
Auntie Mabel is using bricks and mortar to repair a hole in her cottage wall but hasn't enough bricks to finish the job. So she and Pippin fly off in Spotty Plane to get some more. They fly over a clay quarry and visit a factory to see how bricks are made. Auntie Mabel buys some bricks to finish the hole in her wall. They're too heavy to carry and will be delivered on a lorry. Before returning home. Auntie Mabel and Pippin visit a building site. While Auntie Mabel has a go at brick laying. Pippin runs off and gets lost in amongst the machinery. She is in great danger and Auntie Mabel can't find her. At the end of the day, there is still no sign of Pippin and Auntie Mabel goes alone home, worried. But when the lorry arrives with her new bricks, she gets a lovely surprise, Pippin is on the lorry too and the two are reunited. Delivery man: Neil Reidman With thanks to: Hanson Brick, David Wilson Homes
32	2	"Carrots"	Elizabeth Bennett	Elizabeth Bennett	14 January 1997
Pippin is visiting some goats who live next door. Auntie Mabel calls her as it’s time to go to school. Pippin joins in with a class of children singing ‘Old MacDonald’ and goes out to play with them outside, while Auntie Mabel helps out in the kitchen. She serves the children carrots, two pork sausages and potato smilies as part of their lunch, and Pippin has a sausage and some carrots for her lunch. They fly in Spotty Plane to a farm where they find out how carrots grow from seeds. Auntie Mabel sees the carrots being washed sorted and packed ready to go off to the shops. Pippin finds a carrot outside and puts it in her lunch box. When they get home, she gives the carrot to one of the goats.: Trivia: This is the only episode where Auntie Mabel doesn't sing any songs.; With thanks to: Priory School, H. S. & D. Burgess
33	3	"Pencils"	Elizabeth Bennett	Elizabeth Bennett	21 January 1997
Auntie Mabel is drawing a picture of Pippin but she needs a new pencil. They go to a stationery shop to buy one. Auntie Mabel wants to see where pencils come from. She and Pippin fly in Spotty Plane to Seathwaite Fell where graphite was discovered five hundred years ago and Auntie Mabel tells a story about a sheep farmer who used graphite to mark his sheep. They visit a graphite mine where they see how the graphite was chipped away from the rocks. Then they visit a factory where pencils are made from graphite and clay. Pippin is given a piece of graphite and Auntie Mabel buys a set of coloured pencils. Now when they get home, she can complete Pippin's portrait in colour once Pippin has stopped making marks on it with her graphite in return, Auntie Mabel writes Pippin. With thanks to: Cumberland Pencil Co., WHSmith
34	4	"Soap"	Elizabeth Bennett	Elizabeth Bennett	28 January 1997
Pippin helps Auntie Mabel hang her washing on the line. Auntie Mabel gives her a hug and tells her she needs a bath. Pippin hates having a bath and so she runs away and hides in the laundry basket. Auntie Mabel has run out of soap and goes out to buy some more while Pippin stays firmly hidden. Auntie Mabel looks at all the different kinds of soap in the supermarket, buys a bar of soap and takes it home. Then she flies off in Spotty Plane to find out how soap is made. While she's gone, Pippin hides the soap in a biscuit barrel, and when it starts to rain she pulls the washing from the line and drags it through the mud into the kitchen. Auntie Mabel will have to do the washing all over again. With thanks to: Kay's (Ramsbottom) Ltd., Safeway
35	5	"Street Lamps"	Elizabeth Bennett	Elizabeth Bennett	4 February 1997
Auntie Mabel and Pippin are flying home at dusk from a long shopping trip and are admiring the glittering lights below. When they get home, Auntie Mabel tries to switch on the hall light but the bulb has worn out, causing darkness and for her to lose her balance and accidentally knock a couple objects over. Following Auntie Mabel's instructions, Pippin finds a torch in a drawer and they put in a new bulb. Pippin is keen to have her evening walk and while they are out, Auntie Mabel trips over a bag of rubbish because the nearby street lamp isn't working. Auntie Mabel decides to report it to the council the following morning and sings a song about street lamps and their importance. Next day, the sun has stopped rising and Auntie Mabel says "Good morning, Pippin. Rise and shine." to Pippin as she wakes up. Auntie Mabel phones the council to report the faulty street lamp and while walking, they see it in the process of being repaired. They meet Repairman Dave and watch and see how the lamp is repaired, it turns out the bulb the street lamp was using had also worn out, just like the bulb Auntie Mable had replaced that night at home. Dave puts in a new bulb and checks to see if it works which it does. They also find out how street lamps switch themselves on and off automatically when it gets dark and bright outside respectively. Auntie Mabel tells a story about a Victorian lamplighter and they later go for Pippin's evening walk again where they are glad to see the street lamp working. With thanks to: Tim Edwards, London Borough of Hillingdon
36	6	"Brushes"	Elizabeth Bennett	Elizabeth Bennett	11 February 1997
Auntie Mabel's sister Edie is due to visit and so Auntie Mabel is sweeping, brushing and cleaning her house. She even brushes Pippin. She remembers the day she and Pippin visited a factory to see how brushes are made from coconut fibres, plastic and wood. While Auntie Mabel looked around, Pippin made a collection of different brooms and brushes. Auntie Mabel then tells the story 'The Sorcerer's Apprentice', where a boy is having trouble with the brushes and tries to use magic on them which doesn't go very well. With thanks to: John Palmer Brushes
37	7	"Marmalade"	Elizabeth Bennett	Elizabeth Bennett	25 February 1997
Pippin has eaten some bad food and now she isn't feeling well. Auntie Mabel puts food in her fridge to keep fresh, but keeps her marmalade in the larder. She flies to an orange grove in Spain where some of the oranges grown there are being harvested. She flies on to a factory to watch the oranges being made into marmalade. As marmalade used to be thought of as good for upset stomach, Auntie Mabel takes some home and gives a spoonful to Pippin to help her feel better. She tells a story about Mary Queen of Scots who ate some marmalade on a stormy sea voyage to stop herself feeling seasick. Afterwards, Pippin recovers and feels better. With thanks to: Wilkin & Sons, C.A.N.L.A. Seville
38	8	"Frogs"	Elizabeth Bennett	Elizabeth Bennett	4 March 1997
There are frogs living in Auntie Mabel's garden. She finds some frog spawn floating in her pond and describes how the eggs develop into tadpoles which grow into frogs. She tells the story of the tadpole who thought he was a fish until to his horror he began to grow legs. Auntie Mabel and Pippin fly in Spotty Plane to Chester Zoo where they meet a giant African bullfrog and a green Australian tree frog. When they get home, Auntie Mabel gives Pippin a present a toy frog. Pippin carries it into the garden and sets it down on the edge of the pond. With thanks to: Chester Zoo
39	9	"Bulbs"	Elizabeth Bennett	Elizabeth Bennett	11 March 1997
Auntie Mabel loses one of her gardening gloves. While Pippin searches the garden, trying to sniff it out, Auntie Mabel smells the scent of a hyacinth and examines its bulb. It's Spring time and her garden is full of daffodils. She remembers a visit she and Pippin made to Lincolnshire the year before, where they saw fields being planted with daffodil bulbs. She decides to fly back again to see if the bulbs have grown into daffodils. They watch the daffodils being picked and packed ready to go to the shops. Then, Auntie Mabel and Pippin join in the annual Flower Parade in Spalding. When they get home, Pippin finds Auntie Mabel's lost gardening glove in the dustbin. With thanks to: Richard Blackbourn Lingarden
40	10	"Butterflies"	Elizabeth Bennett	Elizabeth Bennett	18 March 1997
Auntie Mabel is weeding her garden but leaving plenty of flowers for the butterflies. She spots a butterfly on the buddleia. It flies off lands on Pippin's nose and Pippin chases it. Auntie Mabel finds out the name of the butterfly which is a peacock butterfly and recites the rhyme "The Butterfly and the Moth". She and Pippin fly in Spotty Plane to a butterfly house where they see many different kinds of butterflies, their eggs, caterpillars and pupae. When they get home, Auntie Mabel tries to catch a moth fluttering around her kitchen light but it's difficult with Pippin around. With thanks to: The Butterfly Centre, Eastbourne

== VHS/DVD Physical Releases ==
The BBC has released seven VHS/DVDs containing various Come Outside programmes based on a particular topic, for mainly educational use only. 39 out of 40 episodes are included, the only missing episode from the collection being "Pencils". "Brushes" is included on the DVD "Keeping Safe, Keeping Well" however it is not shown as included on the DVD case.

=== Animals ===
Released: 3 April, 1995 (VHS) 25 December, 2005 (DVD)

Episodes:

- Geese
- Spiders
- Fish
- Rabbits
- Hedgehogs
- Snails

=== A Windy Day ===
Released: 8 June, 1998 (VHS) April 16, 2007 (DVD)

Episodes:

- A Windy Day
- A Rainy Day
- Holes In The Ground
- Bricks
- Soap

=== Natural Materials ===
Released: 13 November, 1995 (VHS) April 18, 2007 (DVD)

Episodes:

- A Woolly Jumper
- Stones
- Wood
- Clay
- Paper

=== Around Our Homes ===
Released: 18 September, 1995 (VHS) October 2, 2006 (DVD)

Episodes:

- Buses
- A Letter
- Boxes
- Sewage
- Cleaning
- Rubbish
- Water

=== Food ===
Released: 26 June, 1995 (VHS) April 17, 2007 (DVD)

Episodes:

- Crisps
- Eggs
- A Carton Drink
- Apples
- Bread

=== Keeping Safe, Keeping Well ===
Released: 18 May, 1998 (VHS) July 18, 2007 (DVD)

Episodes:

- Useful Holes
- Street Lamps
- Boots
- Brushes (not shown on the case as included but is included on the DVD itself)
- Toothpaste
- Marmalade

=== Plants and other living things ===
Released: 14 September, 1998 (VHS) July 16, 2007 (DVD)

Episodes:

- Dandelions
- Carrots
- Frogs
- Butterflies
- Bulbs
