= Tomas Diagne =

Senegalese turtle biologist and activist

Tomas Diagne is a Senegalese biologist and activist, known for his efforts toward the conservation of turtles in Africa. He is the founder of the African Chelonian Institute, whose purpose is "to promote the long-term conservation of turtle, tortoise and terrapin populations across the African continent".

== Biography ==
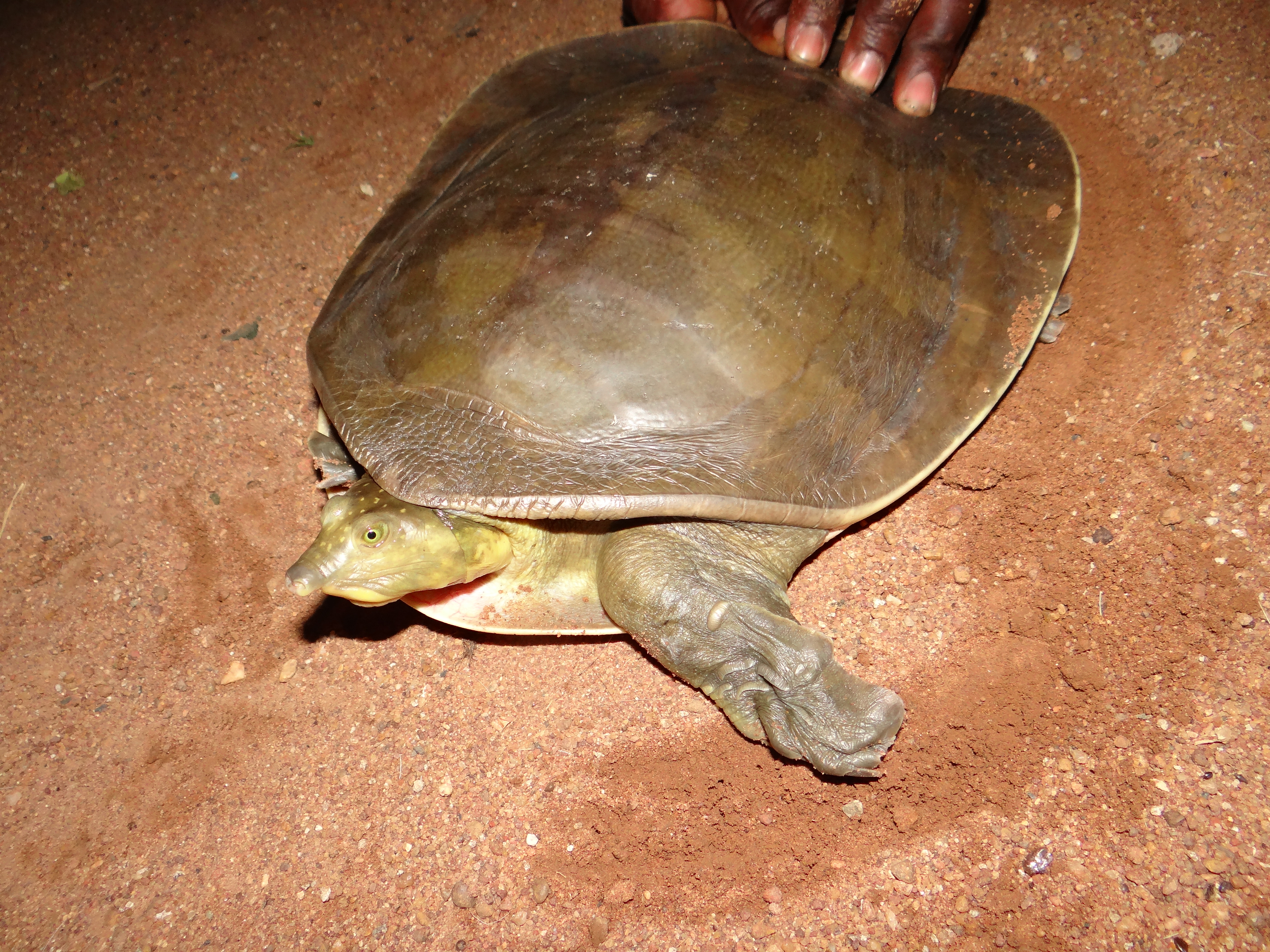
Cyclanorbis senegalensis, Senegal flapshell turtle, 2013 photo by Tomas Diagne

Diagne was born in a family that had military and civil experience, but little interest in wildlife; a love of animals helped make him a conservationist. In the late 1990s, he chaired the African chapter of the Turtle Survival Alliance. An early major project (for which he was given a Rolex Award) was setting up a center in Noflaye to protect Senegal's endangered tortoises. At the center (which he founded with his cousin Lamine), called the Village des Tortues, captured tortoises (especially the African spurred tortoise) are bred; he started it when he was 23. Diagne aimed to fill what he saw as a kind of void: people cared about larger animals, but less about reptiles like turtles and tortoises which, he said, fulfill important ecological functions, including the dissemination of tree seeds, the maintenance of seagrass meadows, and the providing of food for other animals by way of the many eggs they lay and the hatchlings that come from them.

One of the threatened turtles Diagne studies is the Nubian flapshell turtle. When he was told of a carcass of that animal that died in captivity, he and his wife drove 1,200 miles (1,900 km) across America's East Coast to retrieve it; he buried it in their backyard and three months later had it cleaned out so he could display the skeleton at the African Chelonian Institute in Senegal, which he founded in 2009. He said, at the time, it might be the last example of the species.

== Awards ==
In 1998, Diagne was awarded the Rolex Award for his "pioneering conservation work". In 2019, the National Geographic Society gave him the Buffet Award for Leadership in Conservation in Africa. That same year, he received the Tusk Award for Conservation in Africa, which was given to him by Prince William, Duke of Cambridge along with US $26,000, which Diagne gave to the African Chelonian Institute to purchase land to build a center to consolidate all African turtle knowledge.

== Personal life ==
Diagne is married to Dr. Lucy Keith-Diagne, a marine biologist who studies African manatees and cetaceans; she and Tomas co-founded the African Aquatic Conservation Fund, a non-profit wildlife research and conservation institute with offices in Senegal and Madagascar, which Lucy directs.
