= Gordon H. Sato =

American cell biologist

Gordon Hisashi Sato
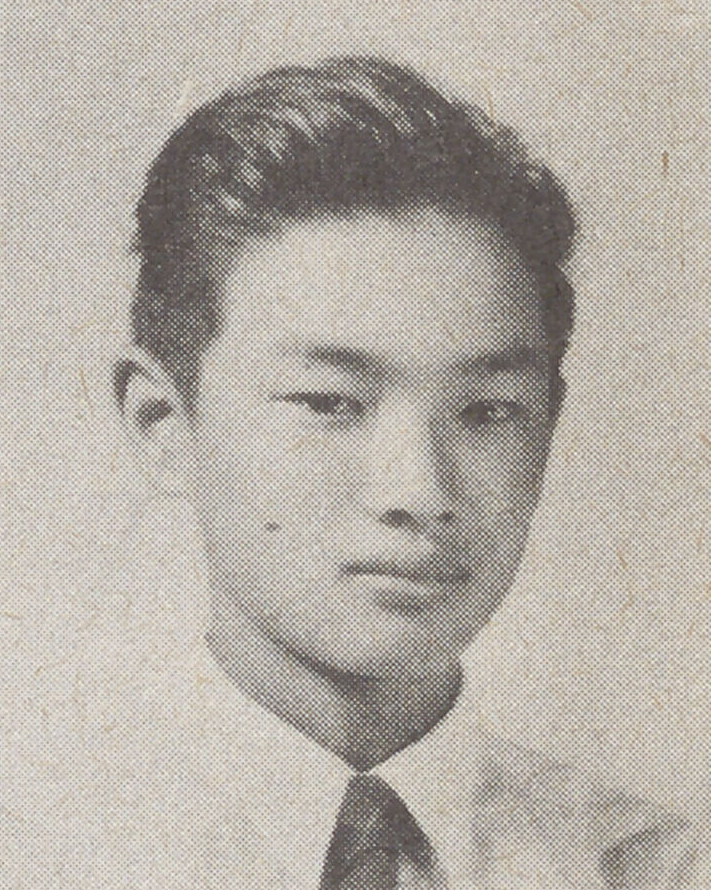
- Sato in the Manzanar High School yearbook, 1944
- Born: December 17, 1927; Los Angeles, California
- Died: March 31, 2017 (aged 89)
- Education: Manzanar High School
- Alma mater: University of Southern California; California Institute of Technology (Ph.D, 1955)
- Known for: Mammalian cell biology
- Awards: Rosenstiel Award (1981); Lifetime Achievement Award from the Society for In Vitro Biology (2002); Asahi Glass Foundation Blue Planet Prize (2005)
- Scientific career
- Fields: Cell biology
- Workplaces: Brandeis University (1958-69); University of California-San Diego (1970-83); The W. Alton Jones Cell Science Center (1983-1992)
- Doctoral advisor: Max Delbruck
- Other academic advisors: Gunther Stent; Theodore Puck

Gordon Hisashi Sato (17 December 1927 – 31 March 2017) was an American cell biologist who first attained prominence for his discovery that polypeptide factors required for the culture of mammalian cells outside the body are also important regulators of differentiated cell functions and of utility in culture of new types of cells for use in research and biotechnology. For this work he was elected in 1984 to the United States National Academy of Sciences. In the mid-1980s he established the Manzanar Project aimed at attacking the planet's most critical problems as poverty, hunger, environmental pollution, and global warming through low tech biotechnological methods in salt water deserts that can be transferred to the indigenous inhabitants.

== Early life ==
Sato was the son of an Issei (Japanese-born immigrant) father and a first generation American born Nisei mother in Los Angeles, California. His fisherman and gardener father taught him the basic concepts of how to cultivate and appreciate living things both on land and water. He was raised on Terminal Island, East San Pedro, where a substantial Japanese American community had developed prior to World War II. Since the area was the home of the Pacific fleet, the Japanese community was forced to relocate after the bombing of Pearl Harbor. After first moving into Los Angeles, in 1942 his family was forced to move to the Manzanar relocation camp for internment of Japanese Americans in the Owens Desert of California. He attended Manzanar High School in the camp where he was a member of the camp baseball team and played saxophone in the camp jazz band called the Jive Bombers. During internment in Manzanar he learned the challenges of gardening in a desert, the importance of becoming self-sufficient under deprived conditions, and sympathy toward aggrieved peoples. After graduation from Manzanar High School in 1944, he attended Central College in Pella, Iowa for a year while working at the Wakonda Country Club before enlisting in the United States Army. In the Army, after service in Korea he landed in Hakata, Japan and saw the home country of one of his parents and his grandparents for the first time.

== Academic career ==
Supported by the G.I. Bill, Sato received a bachelor's degree in biochemistry at the University of Southern California in 1951 and obtained a Ph.D. in biophysics at the California Institute of Technology in 1955. His mentor was future Nobel Prize winner Max Delbrück. After post-doctoral training with Gunther Stent at the University of California, Berkeley and Theodore Puck in Genetics at the University of Colorado at Denver and Health Sciences Center, he was a professor of biochemistry at Brandeis University, Boston, Massachusetts, from 1958 to 1969. He joined the department of biology at the University of California, San Diego where he was a professor from 1970 through 1983. Sato spent summer 1974 through spring 1975 on sabbatical working with Dr. Niels Kaj Jerne at the Basel Institute for Immunology in Basel, Switzerland.

Sato was recruited as director of The W. Alton Jones Cell Science Center, Lake Placid, New York (1983 to 1992). His vision was to build a research university similar to Rockefeller University in the peaceful setting of the Adirondack Mountains of New York. Instead of the dependence on the labile support of individual government and private grants, the goal was to fund and endow the institute by proceeds from a for-profit biotechnology venture called Upstate Biotechnology, Inc.(UBI) which he established in the early 1980s. The idea was a radical concept for the period in which a non-profit research institute (The W. Alton Jones Cell Science Center) would be supported and endowed from profits of a for-profit entity (UBI) solely owned by the non-profit entity. Start-up funds for UBI were solely from loans from tax-deductible gifts to The W. Alton Jones Cell Science Center in order to avoid conflict with private interests with the sole goal of funding the non-profit research goals.

Beyond his basic contributions in cell biology, Sato is known for his unique impact on many students and associates from around the world particularly from Japan and China, both in cell biology and the Manzanar Project. He was one of the first to personally recruit Chinese students and visiting scientists during visits to major Chinese universities at the beginning of the Deng Xiaoping Open Door Policy in the early 1980s. He first developed the idea of companies that directly market research reagents from individual researchers who know most about the product to the science community at large. This concept both helped fund the original investigators who were source of products, distributed essential research tools to the scientific community at large and generated cash flow to support basic research activities. Collaborative Research, Inc. was the first successful venture of this kind.

Sato is co-inventor with his son, Denry Sato, and John Mendelson, CEO of University of Texas MD Anderson Cancer Center, of the original technology used in chemotherapeutic agents based on inhibiting the epidermal growth factor receptor as Cetuximab (Erbitux).

While director of the Lake Placid Center from 1983 to 1992, Sato established the Manzanar Project named after the camp where he and his family were interned in 1942. In 1992 soon after Upstate Biotechnology, Inc. became profitable, private interests acquired control of the company and the mission was diverted from support and endowment of The W. Alton Jones Cell Science Center. Sato subsequently resigned as director and devoted himself full-time to the Manzanar Project.

== The Manzanar Project ==
The project aimed at making salt water and desert combinations productive through application of the simplest, low cost rational scientific approaches had its first prototype in the Salton Sea in southern California. A simple food chain consisting of sewage and other waste on which salt- and heat-resistant algae would feed that then fed brine shrimp that then could be utilized in aquaculture as a food source for larger fishes was developed.

The idea was then expanded to larger scale manmade salt water tidal ponds in coastal deserts that could be utilized for aquaculture in controlled ponds and a tide-controlled food source for larger scale fish ranching that would come to the tidal wash on the coast to feed. Relatively formal conventional pilot projects supported through government programs in China, the Atacama Desert of Chile and the Sudan convinced Sato that the simple aquaculture concept was unlikely to reach those who need and could benefit from it most when administered through government agencies. Through contacts developed in the field that started as modest grassroots relief efforts for suffering remote villagers in Eritrea during the late stages of its war of independence with Ethiopia, Sato solidified and focused the approaches behind the current Manzanar Project that centers in the Eritrean desert on the Red Sea. The project focuses on building economic development by application of the simplest biological principles to develop an entire self-sufficient economy village by village.

The base of the support system centers on development of mangrove forests along the desert coastline. Mangrove trees grow in salt water, provide the base of an entire ecology for aquatic life, and provide lumber for fuel and construction and food for indigenous livestock as camels, goats and sheep. Coupled with Sato's earlier developments in food chain generation for aquaculture, the mangrove forests provide both a land and sea-based economy that once local needs for food and housing are met can be capitalized into a specialty seafood export market. Sato envisions that saltwater deserts when sufficiently populated with mangrove forests and other plants that can flourish in salt water could counteract global impact of deforestation in other areas of the world and bring desert areas into agricultural production.

Sato's first working village prototype is Hargigo, on whose nearby coastline construction of the forests provides jobs for both men and women, the latter of which was unheard of in the local area prior to the project. The population of Hargigo was essentially devastated at one time during the Eritrean War of Independence. Sato and the villagers planted a Mangrove Memorial Garden with the objective of one mangrove tree dedicated to every villager killed in the 1975 massacre. It is estimated that the Manzanar Project has planted nearly one million mangrove trees on the coast of Eritrea since the project began. In a February 2007 National Geographic article, Sato was called a "maritime Johnny Appleseed".

== Awards and honors ==
In 1982 Sato share Brandeis University's Rosenstiel Award with subsequent 1986 Nobel prize winners, biochemist Stanley Cohen and Rita Levi-Montalcini, and in 1984 he was elected to the National Academy of Sciences for his contributions to cell biology.

In 2002 Sato was the recipient of the Lifetime Achievement Award of the Society for In Vitro Biology in 2002 for his contributions in both cell biology and global issues.

Sato was a Laureate of the Rolex Awards for Enterprise in 2002. The annual award with a cash prize of $100,000 recognizes men and women who are breaking new ground in areas which advance human knowledge and well-being.

In 2005 Sato received the Blue Planet Award, a cash prize of 50 million Japanese yen, sponsored by the Asahi Glass Foundation, for developing a new mangrove planting technology in Eritrea and through its utilization thus showing the possibility of building a sustainable local community in the poorest area of the world.

In 2005, Sato was awarded the honorary Doctor of Humane Letters (L.H.D.) from Whittier College.

== Death ==
Gordon H. Sato died at the Beverly Hospital on March 31, 2017.
