= Nabil M. Lawandy =

American physicist and businessman

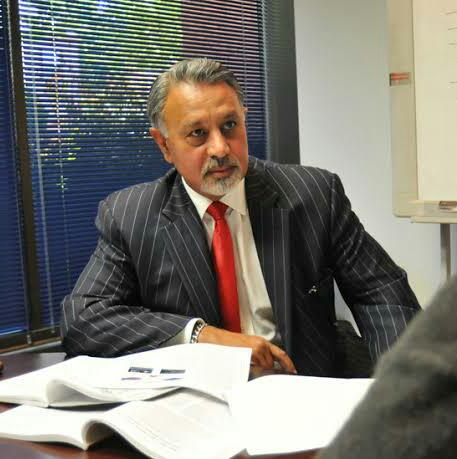
- Born: March 12, 1957 (age 69)
- Education: Johns Hopkins University
- Occupations: Chief Executive Officer of Spectra Systems Corporation and Research Professor of Engineering at Brown University

Nabil Mishreky Lawandy (born March 12, 1957) is an American physicist, inventor, academic, and businessman. After 18 years as a professor of Engineering and Physics at Brown University, Lawandy founded Spectra Systems Corporation. He is currently the President, and Chief Executive Officer of Spectra Systems Corporation, a London Stock Exchange-listed company and is currently a Professor of Research at Brown University in the School of Engineering. Technology invented by Lawandy is used by many of the world's central banks to protect against counterfeiting of banknotes.

== Early life ==
Lawandy was born in Cairo, Egypt to Mishreky Aziz Lawandy and Anastasia Sakelaridis. At the age of eight, the Lawandy family immigrated to Canada and then to the United States, where they became naturalized citizens. Lawandy grew up in northern Virginia and enrolled at the Johns Hopkins University where he graduated with Honors in 1977 and proceeded to complete his Master's from the same university in 1979. The very next year, he completed his Ph.D. in chemical physics at the age of 23.

== Career ==
Work at NASA

Working at the NASA Goddard Space Flight Center, Lawandy was part of a team that developed optically pumped far-infrared molecular lasers for use as local oscillators in astronomical heterodyne detection systems. The lasers developed were used to map the concentration of carbon monoxide (CO) in the Orion Nebula using the Keck telescopes at Mauna Kea.

While still at NASA, Lawandy was one of the first to observe self-pulsing instabilities and deterministic chaos related to the Lorenz instability and dynamic Stark effects in optically pumped molecular lasers.

Work at Brown University

After joining the faculty at Brown University in 1981, Lawandy's work throughout his academic career was a combination of experiment and theory. His early work focused on instabilities and chaos in single and multimode lasers with particular emphasis in coherently driven instabilities associated with three-level systems. Lawandy's group was the first to observe optically encoded second-harmonic generation in bulk glasses and predicted the delocalization of carriers in disordered materials in strong light fields. In addition, Lawandy's research group developed novel laser fabrication methods for micro-optics in glasses, announced the first observations of the inhibition of spontaneous emission in a 3D photonic lattice of self-organized colloidal crystals and random media, Casimir forces in ordered dielectric media, laser action in a 3D FCC structure, and Random Laser action in scattering media with optically pumped dyes providing amplification of light. The work on random lasers [“laser Action in Strongly Scattering Media.” Nature 368, 436 (1994)] has resulted in a large body of work by many groups around the world and has been cited over 1400 times. Lawandy has also contributed to the field of plasmonics and predicted the oscillation of localized surface plasmon modes in systems with amplification.

Lawandy has served as a thesis advisor to 19 Ph.D. students during his tenure as a Professor at Brown University and delivered over forty invited lectures on various research topics. His research has resulted in over 180 papers in refereed journals and 119 conference presentations and has been cited over 3200 times.

Lawandy's career has been covered in many scientific journals and magazines as well as television segments, including The Economist, Scientific American, Science News, Wall Street Journal, Los Angeles Times, Boston Globe, Fox News, and BBC.

== Patents and awards ==
Lawandy holds over 100 published US and international patents in a number of applications spanning optical materials, processes, and devices and authentication technology. He is an Alfred P. Sloan Fellow, a recipient of a Cottrell Award, the Presidential Young Investigator Award, a 1995 Photonics Circle of Excellence Award, the Slater Foundation Innovation Award, and the Rolex Prize for his work on using Random Lasers for Photo-medicine.

He has served as an editor for Optics Communications and Current Topics in Optics as well as on the scientific advisory boards of Orchid BioComputer and Finesse Solutions.
