= Sheridan Snyder Tennis Center =

Sports venue in Charlottesville, Virginia

Coordinates: 38°2′19.05″N 78°30′24.44″W

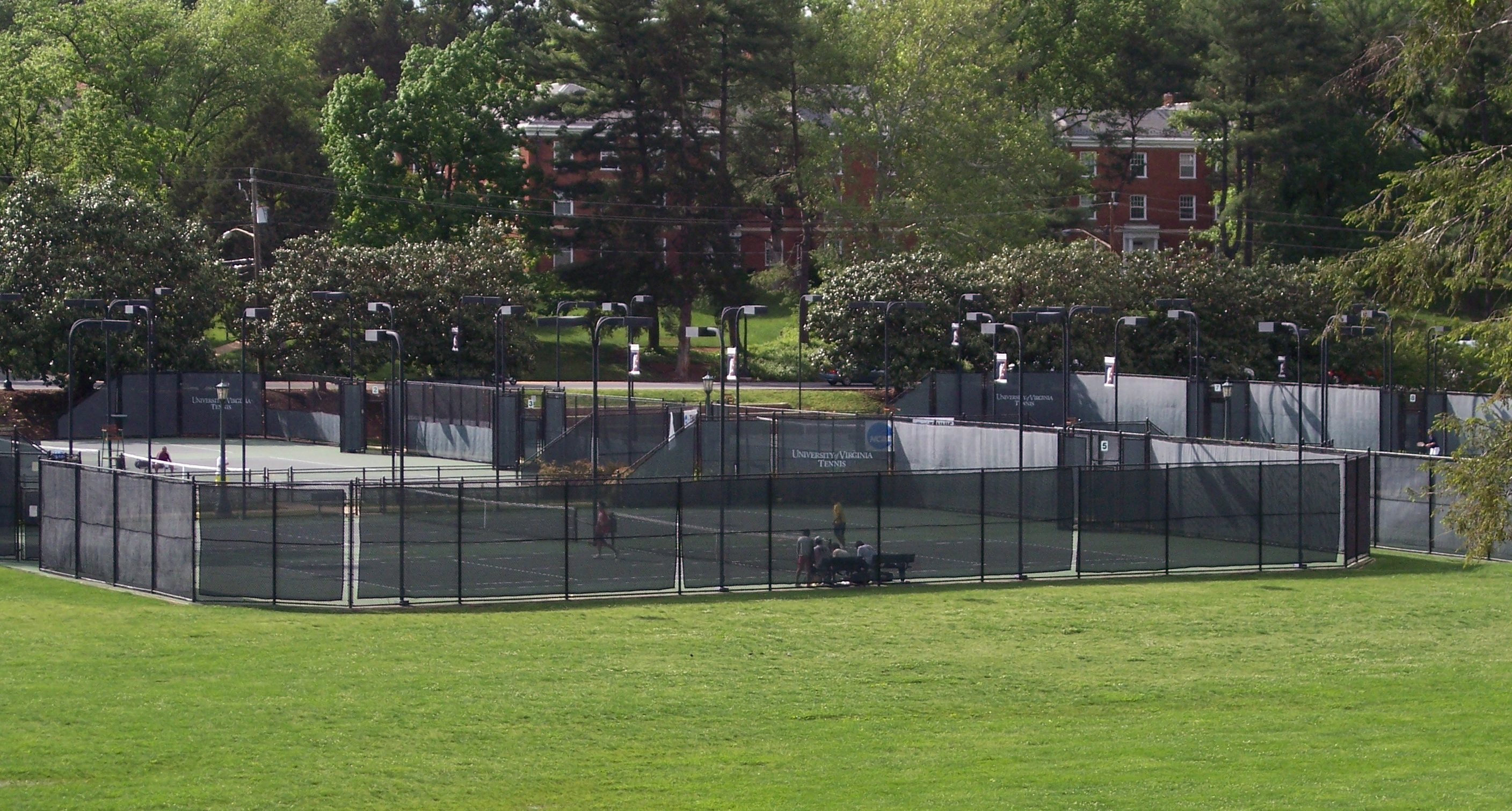
- The Snyder Center courts
- Interactive map of Sheridan Snyder Tennis Center
- Location: 210 Emmet Street South; Charlottesville, Virginia 22904
- Owner: University of Virginia
- Operator: University of Virginia
- Capacity: 1,000
- Surface: Hard courts
- Field size: 13 hard courts

Construction
- Opened: 1997
- Cost: $1,400,000

Tenants
- Virginia Cavaliers (men's & women's tennis)

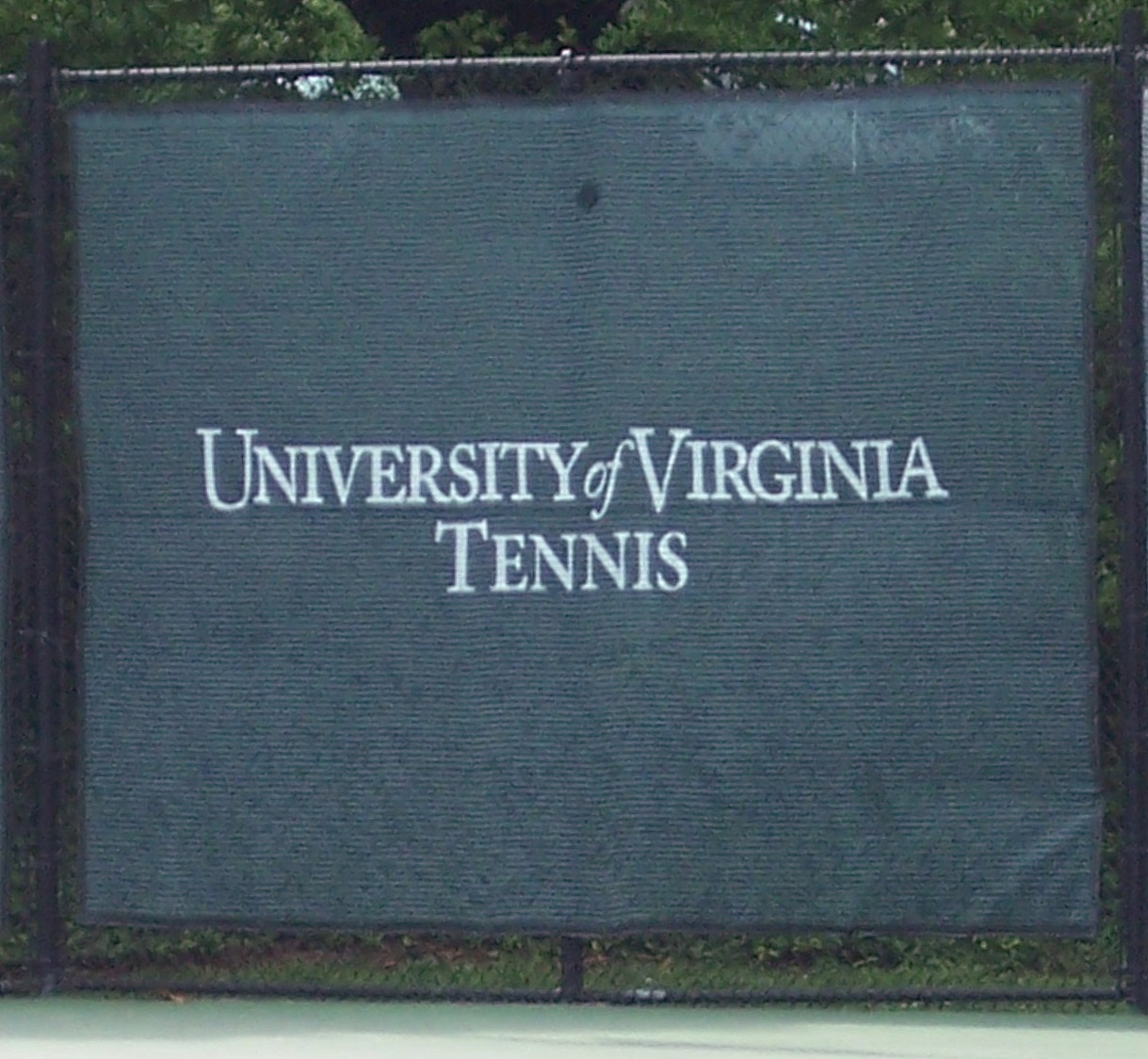

The Sheridan Snyder Tennis Center at the University of Virginia opened in 1997 right next to Memorial Gymnasium. The 13-court facility showcases Virginia's men's and women's tennis teams.

== Configuration ==
The complex has spectator areas built into the adjacent hillsides. Plans for the complex also include a tennis pavilion that will house instructional and meeting areas, tournament administration headquarters, and equipment storage space.

== Namesake ==
The tennis center is named after Sheridan Snyder, a 1958 University of Virginia graduate who founded the National Junior Tennis League. Snyder is also a board member of Friends of Virginia Tennis.

== Tennis in Charlottesville ==
Virginia's Sheridan Snyder Tennis Center not only provides a home for the Cavaliers, but also hosts institutions from the community and around the nation. In addition to University faculty and staff tournaments, clinics, and student classes, the courts accommodate community participants in the Dogwood Festival Tournament, and a number of Junior Tournaments.

== Past Facilities ==
Tennis facilities at Virginia date back to 1931 with the construction of the Lady Astor tennis courts. The school's first tennis center was made possible by a gift from Nancy Astor, a Virginia-born member of the British Parliament, who contributed her resources on the condition that others would take part in the venture.

== See also ==
- University of Virginia
- Virginia Cavaliers
