= Les Stocker =

English accountant and activist (1943-2016)

Les Stocker

Les Stocker MBE (31 January 1943 – 16 July 2016 ) was an English accountant and wildlife welfare activist who founded the Wildlife Hospital Trust in 1983. This was the United Kingdom's first hospital for wild animals and rescued so many hedgehogs that it is now known as Tiggywinkles.

Stocker has been credited with revolutionising the treatment of sick or injured wild animals in Britain through the practice of wildlife rehabilitation, which is now commonplace across the country. He received numerous honours for this work including the Rolex Awards for Enterprise, an appointment as a Member of the Most Excellent Order of the British Empire (MBE) and recognition as an honorary associate of the Royal College of Veterinary Surgeons.

== Biography ==
Stocker was born on 31 January 1943 in Battersea to Rose (née Weaving) Stocker, a civil servant, and Rob Stocker, a site manager. He attended Emanuel School in Battersea and became an accountant, and also had a spell running a company specialising in electrical engineering. He married Sue Gee in 1964 and moved to Buckinghamshire.

Les Stocker began his work of wildlife rehabilitation by rescuing and treating animals in a garden shed at his home. In 1983, he established the Wildlife Hospital Trust, the country's first wildlife hospital. A drought in 1984 brought a large number of distressed hedgehogs to the hospital as patients. In 1985, in response, Stocker set up a ward solely to treat the numerous hedgehogs. He named the ward St Tiggywinkles after The Tale of Mrs. Tiggy-Winkle by Beatrix Potter. The entire Wildlife Hospital Trust hospital gradually came to be known simply as "Tiggywinkles". In 1991, Stocker moved Tiggywinkles to its present location in Haddenham.

Under Stocker, Tiggywinkles pioneered new treatments for wild animals, ranging from birds of prey, like kestrels, to toads and badgers. About 30% of the approximately 10,000 animals treated at Tiggywinkles each year are hedgehogs, so Stocker and his staff developed new medical treatments specifically for hedgehogs and these are now used by rehabilitation centres throughout Britain. He also established a museum at Tiggywinkles, showcasing hedgehog-related artifacts from ancient Egypt to the present day.

Rolex honoured Stocker with its Rolex Award for Enterprise in 1990 and he was appointed an MBE in 1991 for his service to wildlife. In 2002, the Royal College of Veterinary Surgeons recognised Stocker, who had no formal veterinary training, as an honorary associate.

== Personal life ==
He published a memoir, Something in a Cardboard Box (1989), in which he encouraged others to give back and make a difference.

Stocker died unexpectedly on 16 July 2016 at the age of 73. He was survived by his wife, Sue, whom he married in 1964, their son, Colin, who currently manages the Wildlife Hospital Trust, and his granddaughters, Amelia and Alexia.
