= Come Outside =

British educational children's TV show

- Genre: Children's; Educational; Comedy
- Created by: Elizabeth Bennett; Ronald Smedley
- Directed by: Elizabeth Bennett; Peter Rose; Barbara Roddam
- Starring: Lynda Baron as Auntie Mabel; Pippin and Mr. Higgins as Pippin
- Composer: Jonathan Cohen
- Country of origin: United Kingdom
- Original language: English
- No. of series: 3
- No. of episodes: 40 (list of episodes)

Production
- Executive producers: Judy Whitfield; Stacey Adams; Anne Brogan
- Producer: Elizabeth Bennett
- Production locations: Greater London & Buckinghamshire
- Editors: David Austin; Jon Bignold
- Camera setup: Graham Latter; Lee Pulbrook; Jeremy Braben
- Running time: 14 minutes
- Production companies: Spelthorne Productions (Series 1); Tricorn Productions (Series 2–3)

Original release
- Network: BBC Two
- Release: 23 September 1993 – 18 March 1997

Come Outside is a British educational children's television series that ran from 23 September 1993 to 18 March 1997 on BBC Two and was on rerun on CBeebies from 2002 to 2012. The programme stars Lynda Baron as Auntie Mabel, who, accompanied by her dog Pippin, explores how everyday objects are made and how things work, often travelling by her spotty aeroplane to visit factories and other unique locations around the United Kingdom.

== Overview ==
The series aims to encourage young children to learn about the world around them. The starting point for each programme is something with which children may already be familiar, such as: wood, paper, boots, spiders, buses, soap and lampposts.

The two main characters are Auntie Mabel (played by Lynda Baron), and her dog Pippin, who was initially played by a female dog also called Pippin. A feature of Come Outside is Auntie Mabel's unusual mode of transport: a small aeroplane (a Slingsby T67 Firefly) with multi-coloured polka dots.

== Transmissions ==
Series	Episodes	Originally released	
Series	Episodes	First released	Last released
1	11	23 September 1993	2 December 1993
2	19	22 September 1994	9 March 1995
3	10	7 January 1997	18 March 1997

== Characters ==
- (Auntie) Mabel Featherstone (played by Lynda Baron) – The main character of the show, who lives with her dog, Pippin, and says "Hello, me dears" to the viewers at the start of every episode. In some episodes, a close up of Auntie Mabel's left hand can be seen, revealing a wedding ring. However, Auntie Mabel never talks of her spouse, but rather about her sister Edie.
- Pippin (played by both Pippin and Mr. Higgins in S1, and by Mr. Higgins only from S2 onwards) – Auntie Mabel's pet dog and the main animal character of the show. Pippin is often shown to be extremely intelligent and often has a comedy sub-plot during each episode, where she gets up to mischief without Mabel knowing. For example, in the episode "A Carton Drink", she eats the sausages from her lunchbox; in the episode "Soap", she hides the bar of soap to avoid having a bath; and the episode "A Woolly Jumper" ends with Pippin finding a jumper knitted by Auntie Mabel, and then pulling on it and causing it to unravel. The closing credits included the billing "Pippin trained by Ann Head".
- Edie Featherstone – Auntie Mabel's sister, who is often referred to but never seen on-screen. However, her voice was heard in the episode "A Woolly Jumper". She owns a pet rabbit called Bobby, who Auntie Mabel looks after in the episode "Rabbits".
- Jay – Auntie Mabel's nephew, a young boy who only appeared in "A Rainy Day".
- Great Aunt Edna – Auntie Mabel's great aunt, who was also never seen on screen, but is mentioned by Mabel in the episode "Toothpaste".

== Animals ==
Pippin was a mixed-breed dog, half Tibetan Terrier, half Bearded Collie, roughly third generation descended from the famous American acting dog Benji and was owned and trained by the award-winning animal trainer Ann Head. Pippin was quite old at the start of the first series in 1993 and so she performed the slower but more complex moves while her grandson, Mr. Higgins, performed any physically demanding actions.

Pippin retired at the end of Series 1 and Mr. Higgins took over the role of 'Pippin' entirely for Series 2 and 3. Mr. Higgins also starred as the Bakers dog for Bakers Complete pet food commercials and is still pictured on the products. He died in 2008 of old age, while Pippin died in the late 1990s.

Many other animals took part in Come Outside. Specially-shot footage included snails from London Zoo, frogs at Chester Zoo, geese at Folly Farm in Pembrokeshire, rabbits at Tilgate Nature Centre in West Sussex, butterflies in the Butterfly Centre, Eastbourne, hedgehogs supplied by St. Tiggywinkles Animal Hospital and spiders from a private collection. In addition, archive shots were provided by the BBC's Natural History Film Library in Bristol.

== Production details ==
Elizabeth Bennett created the format and characters, wrote the scripts, directed many of the programmes and produced all three series.

Two different production companies were involved. Series 1 was made by Spelthorne Productions, which has since closed; Series 2 and 3 were made by Elizabeth Bennett's production company Tricorn Associates.

Aerial views of the various locations visited by Auntie Mabel were shot by Jeremy Braben. A "Flying sequence" billing for Alan Cassidy, David Arkell and Jeremy Braben appeared on the closing credits for both seasons.

Series 1 was set in a cottage on the corner of Denham Airfield in Buckinghamshire, and was used to provide the exterior shots of Auntie Mabel's house. She would come out of the house, walk through the back garden and on to the airfield to climb into her aeroplane (a 1989 Slingsby T67C Firefly registered G-RAFG). The interiors were shot at Capital Studios in Wandsworth, South West London.

Series 2 was shot entirely on location, including the interior of Auntie Mabel's house — except the bathroom in the "Spiders" episode, which was shot in a studio. The cottage at Denham Airfield was now occupied, and so a new location had to be found. An empty cottage on a farmland in Harefield in Western Greater London was rented. To allow for the change of location to be incorporated into the show's continuity, a programme about moving house was shot to link the two locations, which makes the first series the third chronologically. The plane (now a 1988 Slingsby T67C Firefly registered G-BOCM) was kept in a field nearby.

Series 3 was commissioned two years later and was also shot at the cottage in Harefield. A much older plane (a 1983 Slingsby T67M Firefly registered G-SFTZ) was used, now featuring a spiralled propeller.

In every episode, Mabel ventures outside, with filming taking place at locations across the United Kingdom, including a pencil factory in Keswick, the manufacture of Wellington boots in Dumfries, a pottery in Stoke, bulb growing and the annual flower parade in Spalding, Lincolnshire, and brush-making in Portsmouth.

Sometimes Auntie Mabel's adventures stayed closer to home. For example, the episode "Buses" was filmed around the Ruislip area of North London. Scenes were also shot in Woodley, Berkshire, in the retail precinct and in the veterinary clinic.

In the episode "Marmalade", Auntie Mabel flies to Seville to visit an orange grove. Shooting was restricted to the one day on which the oranges were ready for harvesting. This was only known with very short notice and consequently arrangements to fly out were made at the last minute. It happened well outside the main production period, by which time Lynda Baron was committed to other acting work and unavailable to travel to Seville. To make it appear that Auntie Mabel had visited the orange grove, Baron was recorded in the studio against a blue-screen background while a body double was used for reverse angle shots of her in Spain.

Animation sequences for stories, songs and skits was done by Penny Holton, Touch Animation, Really Animated Pictures and Ealing Animation (occasionally).

== Awards and honours ==
The episode called "Bricks" won the Royal Television Society Educational Television Award 1997 in the Pre-school and Infants category.
