= Tiggywinkles =

British animal charity

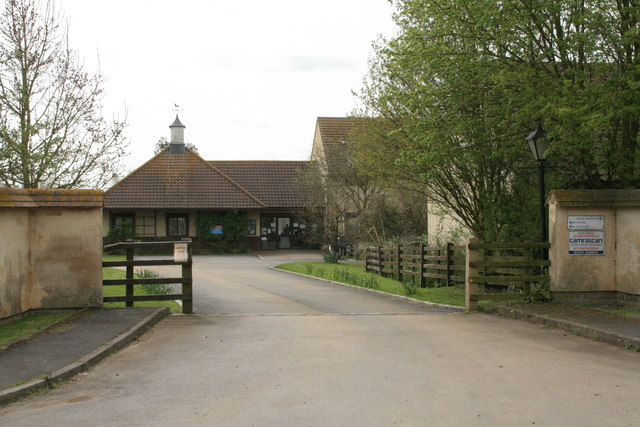
- Entrance to the Tiggywinkles Wildlife Hospital
- Named after: Mrs Tiggy-Winkle from The Tale of Mrs. Tiggy-Winkle
- Formation: 1983; 43 years ago
- Founder: Les Stocker, Sue Stocker, Colin Stocker
- Registration no.: 286447
- Legal status: Charity
- Purpose: Wildlife rehabilitation and education Veterinary education
- Website: www.sttiggywinkles.org.uk

Tiggywinkles is a British animal welfare charity and wildlife hospital, also known as St Tiggywinkles and The Wildlife Hospital Trust. Tiggywinkles, which specialises in the rescue and treatment of wild animals, was founded in 1983 as the Wildlife Hospital Trust by Les Stocker as the United Kingdom's first wildlife hospital. The name derives from the titular hedgehog character in Beatrix Potter's story The Tale of Mrs. Tiggy-Winkle.

It is based at Haddenham, Buckinghamshire, where it operates an animal hospital and visitor centre, and teaches wild animal practice to veterinary surgeons and veterinary nurses.

== History ==
The animal welfare hospital takes its name from the character in the children's story The Tale of Mrs. Tiggy-Winkle, by English writer and illustrator Beatrix Potter.

In 1978, Les and Sue Stocker and their son Colin started caring for injured wild animals. In the following years, their activities began to attract attention and led to increasing numbers of animals being brought into their home. The Stockers formally registered The Wildlife Hospital Trust as a charity in 1983.

Les Stocker was the recipient of a Rolex Award for Enterprise in 1990 for his work at the hospital. In 1991, he was made a Member of the Order of the British Empire for services to wildlife. Les Stocker died on 16 July 2016, after a short illness, aged 73.

In 2018–19, Tiggywinkles had an annual expenditure of £1,618,673.

In 2025, Tiggywinkles 'indefinitely' suspended Russell Brand as an ambassador for the charity, following his sexual harassment charges by the Metropolitan Police. CEO, Colin Stocker, told The Mirror: "With the news of the extremely serious charges announced last week, our senior team met and immediately suspended Mr Brand from his ambassador role at Tiggywinkles, indefinitely".

== Cultural impact ==
Les Stocker wrote a popular account of his work at the hospital, Something in a Cardboard Box: Tales from a Wildlife Hospital (1989) and a number of books based on the work of the hospital, including a veterinary manual, Practical Wildlife Care (2000).

Beginning in July 2008, Tiggywinkles was the setting for Wild Animal ER, a 20-part, half-hour documentary TV series presented by Kate Gerbeau, and shown on Channel Five in the UK.

It was also featured in the first episode of Come Outside called "Hedgehogs".

== See also ==
- Royal Society for the Prevention of Cruelty to Animals
- Wildlife rehabilitation
