= Sheridan Snyder =

American businessperson (1936–2022)

- Born: October 20, 1936; Long Island, New York, U.S.
- Died: December 12, 2022 (aged 86)
- Occupations: Chairman and CEO, BioCatalyst International

Sheridan Gray Snyder OBE (October 20, 1936 – December 12, 2022) was an American entrepreneur, venture capitalist, and philanthropist in the biotechnology industry. He is the founder and CEO of Biocatalyst, Genzyme and other companies.

Snyder died on December 12, 2022, at the age of 86.

== Beginnings ==
=== Education ===
Snyder graduated from The Lawrenceville School in New Jersey and is a 1958 graduate of The University of Virginia with a Bachelor of Arts in French & Romance Languages. At UVa, Snyder was a member of the SPE social fraternity. Snyder received an Honorary Doctorate of Law degree from the University of Dundee in 2002.

=== Cambridge Machine Corporation ===
Snyder founded Cambridge Machine Corporation, which initiated the development and invention of high-speed mailing/envelope inserting machines. By 1970 Snyder had sold Cambridge Machine Corporation to Pitney-Bowes, where he subsequently worked as National Sales Account manager.

=== Instapak ===
In 1971, Snyder founded a packaging company, Instapak, funded by venture capitalist, Ed Glassmeyer. Instapak markets "foam-in-place packaging" that creates a protective barrier for heavy, fragile instrumentation and computer systems. Instapak is now the largest division of Sealed Air Corporation (NYSE: SEE), with more than 5,500 employees and revenues of $1 billion.

== Biotechnology ==
=== Genzyme ===
In its earliest moments "Genzyme was just really the combination" of Snyder and Henry Blair, a technician at the New England Enzyme Center at Tufts Medical School, who had worked for Roscoe Brady at the National Institute of Health (NIH). According to Snyder, he and Blair "started developing a business on our own." Blair had a contract with the National Institutes of Health (NIH) to produce modified enzymes for the NIH and test it in clinical trials. Roscoe and his colleagues had been working on a treatment for Gaucher's disease for over a decade at that time. Snyder was transformed by the idea that entrepreneurs could "actually help people and save some lives."

Genzyme's first office was an old clothing warehouse adjacent to Tufts Medical School.

Snyder served as Genzyme's first Chairman, President and CEO until Henri Termeer was appointed as CEO in 1985. In 1988 Termeer took over as Genzyme's Chairman.

By 1983 Genzyme interviewed Baxter employee Henri Termeer, who had completed his MBA at Snyder's alma mater, the University of Virginia in 1973. By that time Genzyme had seventeen employees who worked in an old clothing warehouse adjacent to Tufts Medical School. Genzyme also had a small diagnostics operation in England.

Bio Information Associates (BIA)

By 1983 Genzyme developed close ties with a group of entrepreneurial professors from MIT and Harvard. These "well-known, full professors who had a lot of multidisciplinary post-docs" had formed a successful Boston-based business management consulting firm a Bio Information Associates (BIA) in 1980. As Termeer described it, "Genzyme was just these professors from MIT and myself and some venture capitalists."

One of these professors was a Harvard chemistry professor, George M. Whitesides who founded many companies. He is considered to be Genzyme's co-founder.

In 1986, Snyder initiated the first sale of Genzyme stock shares (Initial Public Offering).

"In the formative years of biotechnology, Genzyme was the industry’s Apple, blazing a pathway for creating protein-based treatments for rare diseases."

=== Upstate ===
In 1994 Snyder founded Argonex a small biotech start-up in Charlottesville, Virginia. In 1996, Snyder founded and served as chairman and chief executive officer of Upstate Biotechnology Incorporated, merging it with Argonex. Upstate Inc. develops cell signaling products, technology platforms and services. Upstate was sold to Serologicals Corporation in 2004 for $205 million.

== Awards ==
In 1999, the State of Virginia honored Snyder with its Biotechnology Lifetime Achievement Award.

In 2003, he was appointed to Scotland’s International Advisory Board and serves as an advisor to the Scottish government on the development of its biotech sector. In this capacity, Snyder played a role with the development of an 800,000-square-foot (74,000 m^{2}) bioscience translational center outside Edinburgh.

Snyder was honored OBE (Officer of the Order of the British Empire) in 2005 by HM Queen Elizabeth II of the United Kingdom on the advice of the British government.

== Board of directors ==
He is a member of the board of trustees of the Ivy Charitable Foundation, which was created in 2000 and has been a benefactor of the University of Virginia's biomedical programs. In 2005 the Ivy Charitable Foundation donated "$45 million to the University of Virginia Health System to expand laboratory space for biomedical research and to speed the translation of new discoveries into effective treatments and cures." This gift was used to construct a new Children's Hospital, the Emily Couric Cancer Center and the Sheridan G. Snyder Translational Research Center.

== Philanthropy ==
=== Tennis ===
Snyder funded and developed the National Junior Tennis League (NJTL), along with the encouragement and support of Arthur Ashe and Charles Pasarell. Snyder supported the NJTL for 15 years. This organization now operates, through the USTA, in 110 cities and reaches 250,000 inner-city youths.

In 1988, Snyder was the founder, chairman and CEO of Compuflo Inc., which developed a specialty high-end computer program used to analyze airflow to aid the design of aircraft and autos, a company donated to the University of Virginia to support its laboratories. Snyder also funded University Technology Corporation, where companies were formed with University of Virginia technology and the proceeds generated by these business ventures were donated back to the University.

In 1995 Snyder contributed to the construction of a new tennis center at the University of Virginia which was named the Sheridan Snyder Tennis Center.

In 2008 Snyder received the Intercollegiate Tennis Association Achievement Award for achievements outside the game of tennis.
