= Alexis Belonio =

Filipino professor, engineer, and scientist

Alexis T. Belonio
- Born: January 1, 1960 (age 66); Muñoz, Nueva Ecija, Philippines
- Education: Central Luzon State University
- Known for: Rice husk-powered gas stove
- Awards: Rolex Award for Enterprise (2008)
- Scientific career
- Fields: Agricultural engineering
- Workplaces: International Rice Research Institute; Central Philippine University

Alexis T. Belonio (born January 1, 1960) is a professor, engineer, scientist, innovator and inventor from the Philippines. He was "the first Filipino to receive the Rolex Award for Enterprise" in 2008 for his invention of a low-cost and environment friendly rice husk stove. Belonio was included by the Rolex watchmaking company on its list of 10 model innovators in November 2008. He serves as the incumbent chair of the Agricultural Engineering and Environmental Management department of Central Philippine University.

== Life and career ==
Belonio was born and raised in Muñoz, Nueva Ecija. He earned his bachelor's degree in agricultural engineering and Master of Science degree from Central Luzon State University. He was a researcher for the International Rice Research Institute before moving to Central Philippine University.

As an associate professor of agricultural engineering at the Central Philippine University, he received $50,000 and a chronometer from the Rolex company for being included in the five Associate Laureates of the Rolex Award for Enterprise. Belonio was 48 years old when he received the award, and said that he would use the money he received in promoting and disseminating his technology to other people without asking anything in return, by publishing information about the invention and establishing a Center for Rice Husk Technology in Iloilo, Philippines, the first of its kind in the country. The actual formal recognition of Belonio by Rolex as the first Filipino Associate Laureate of the Rolex Award was held at The Manila Peninsula in the City of Makati on January 21, 2009.

== Rice husk-powered gas stove ==
=== History ===
Belonio started work relating to rice husks in 2003, at a time when there were high fuel prices. As an expert, he had already designed thirty devices such as paddy dryers and water pumps which can be used by low-income Filipino farmers. Belonio concentrated on innovating the rice husk oven even though the concept was not a new one, because there was already the so-called Lo Trao from Vietnam. The difference was that Belonio's invention does not produce smoke and has a stable fire without a tar-like residue. Belonio used good engineering and ample ventilation for his stove, which is characterized by a small fan that is powered either by grid electricity or batteries, producing a more efficient burn of the rice husks.

Belonio's first ovens cost $100 (or around ₱5,000) each but, due to further development and research, he was able to lower the price to $25 (or around ₱1,250) each. The only expected expense for the user of the oven would be 20 cents per day for running the built-in fan inside the stove. The invention is currently being produced by companies in the Philippines, Indonesia, and Cambodia, all cooperating with Belonio's works. According to Belonio his stove would be able to save a family of rice farmers $150 per year in fuel expenses. He also added that a ton of rice husk contains energy equal to 415 liters of petroleum (or 378 liters of kerosene). Belonio's stove lessens toxic fumes and smoke that affect the environment and reduces greenhouse gases. The burnt remnants of the rice husks can later be used as soil fertilizers or in making small blocks of coal substitute.

=== Description ===
Belonio's rice husk stove is a small cylinder equipped with a fan in its base, which provides air during the conversion of rice hulls into gas. It was designed as an apparatus that can be easily operated. Fish can be fried in fifteen minutes using the stove. The stove consumes 2 kilograms of rice husks per hour. It does not produce any smoke and the burnt rice husks can still be used as coal and also as insulating cement for traditional stoves fueled by wood. Plans for the stove are available free of charge from the internet.
