= Rolex Awards for Enterprise =

Rolex - Awards for Enterprise

The Rolex Awards for Enterprise is an award from Rolex since 1976 to support exceptional individuals who take on major challenges, and projects to improve the world. Each winner receives 100,000 Swiss francs (about $104,000).

In 2010, the Rolex Awards introduced a programme for Young Laureates. Its goal was to foster innovation in the next generation by selecting five young enterprising individuals and providing them with funding and publicity for their projects. Each Young Laureate receives 50,000 Swiss francs (about $52,000).

== Recipients ==
=== 1978 ===
- Luc Jean-François Debecker, France. Explore prehistoric lifestyles and beliefs through the study of European cave paintings.
- Billy Lee Lasley, United States. Facilitate the breeding of endangered birds by developing a non-invasive method to identify their sex.
- Kenneth Lee Marten, Ethiopia. Save the Abyssinian wolf in Ethiopia by developing a conservation programme.
- Francine Patterson, United States. Test the ability of gorillas to learn and use human sign language.

=== 1981 ===
- Rodney M. Jackson, Nepal. Protect the endangered Himalayan snow leopard through radio-tracking and study.
- Eduardo Llerenas, Mexico. Trace and record Mexico’s traditional folk music to preserve the country’s rich musical heritage.
- Delia Owens and Mark Owens

=== 1984 ===
- Martine Fettweis-Viénot, Guatemala. Create the first complete catalogue of Mayan wall paintings to study their role in Mayan society.
- Kenneth W. Hankinson, Antarctica. Undertake the first over-winter stay in tents in Antarctica’s Brabant Island and make pioneering studies.
- Donald R. Perry, Costa Rica. Design an ‘aerial tram’ with a system of ropes and pulleys to open the tropical forest canopy to observation.
- Thean Soo Tee, Malaysia. Help prevent soil erosion and create a new cash crop by introducing asparagus to his country.
- Michel Terrasse, France. Reintroduce vultures to the Cévennes region of France to ensure their survival.

=== 1987 ===
- Jacques Luc Autran, Maldives. Bring medical and technical aid by ship to isolated communities on the islands of the Indian Ocean.
- Stephen W. Kress, United States. Develop new techniques for the successful conservation of endangered seabirds.
- Pierre Morvan, Nepal. Study ground beetles to improve understanding of what triggers evolutionary change.
- Nancy L. Nash, China. Broaden the understanding of conservation by researching and applying Buddhist precepts on nature.
- Johan Gjefsen Reinhard, Peru. Preserve the patrimony of the Andean people through high-altitude cultural anthropology and archaeology.

=== 1990 ===
- John F. Asmus, China. Pioneering use of lasers in art preservation.
- Suryo Wardhoyo Prawiroatmodjo, Indonesia. Establish Indonesia’s first environmental education centre and pioneer an innovative model for this field.
- Les Stocker, United Kingdom. Create Europe’s first-ever wildlife teaching hospital in England to care for injured wild animals.
- Anita Studer, Brazil. Develop a long-term reforestation and environmental education programme.

=== 1993 ===
- Nancy M. Abeiderrahmane-Jones, Mauritania. Develop the world’s first industrial production of camel cheese.
- Antonio De Vivo, Mexico. Explore the underground rivers and caves of the Rio La Venta Canyon in southern Mexico.
- Steven Lurie Garrett, United States. Develop a sound-powered, CFC-free refrigerator to help reduce depletion of the ozone layer.
- Aldo Lo Curto, Brazil. Produce a practical, illustrated health education manual for the Indians of the Brazilian Amazon.
- Forrest Marion Mims III, United States. Design and develop a device that monitors ultraviolet radiation and ozone levels.

=== 1996 ===
==== Laureates ====
- Gilbert A. Clark, United States. Enable students worldwide to access a network of professional telescopes and operate them by remote control.
- Sanoussi Diakité, Senegal. Invent a fonio-husking machine to revive cultivation of this healthy, inexpensive cereal in Africa.
- Royce O. Hall, Tanzania. Build an eye hospital in Tanzania and bring state-of-the-art surgery procedures to the African countryside.
- Georgina Herrmann, Turkmenistan. Explore the Silk Road caravan city of Merv.
- William Rosenblatt, United States. Transfer unused medical supplies to the developing world.

==== Associate Laureates ====
- Sabine Cotte, Bhutan. Produce a manual of simple conservation techniques for the monks at Bhutan’s fortified monasteries.
- Eric Gilli, France. Study traces of ancient earthquakes in caves to develop a new methodology for predicting earthquakes.
- Gorur R. Iyengar Gopinath, India. Expand ecological silk-farming in India to preserve the environment and improve living standards.
- Hans Hendrikse, South Africa. Produce a low-cost rolling water drum to allow efficient and easy water transport in developing countries.
- Norberto Luis Jácome, Argentina. Pioneer efforts to protect the Andean condor – store reproductive material of endangered species in a genetic bank.
- Nabil M. Lawandy, United States. Develop an inexpensive photodynamic treatment for certain forms of cancer.
- Mario Robles del Moral, Spain. Establish a national reforestation programme in Spain in light of a major soil-erosion problem.
- Jun’Ichi Shinozaki, Japan. Research the environment in the mountains of the Pacific Rim to determine pollution levels.
- George van Driem, Nepal. Record the disappearing languages of the Himalayan region.
- Frithjof Voss, China. Use satellites to control locust swarms in Africa.

=== 1998 ===
==== Laureates ====
- Cristina Bubba Zamora, Bolivia. Recover stolen Bolivian ceremonial weavings and return them to their original Andean communities.
- Wijaya Godakumbura, Sri Lanka. Replace makeshift kerosene-oil bottle lamps with safe lamps to prevent severe burns.
- Rafael Guarga, Uruguay. Protect crops from frost with an innovative, inexpensive cold-extracting chimney.
- Louis Liebenberg, South Africa. Develop a hand-held computer that modernizes ancient tracking skills and improves wildlife management.
- Jean-François Pernette, Argentina and Chile. Explore and map the Earth’s southernmost underground caves on remote islands of Patagonia.
- Amanda Vincent, Philippines. Protect seahorses in the Philippines and develop an alternative livelihood for fishing communities.

==== Associate Laureates ====
- Catherine Abadie-Reynal, Turkey. Excavate two ancient cities on Turkey’s Euphrates before the area is flooded by an artificial lake.
- Erna Alant, South Africa. Expand a programme of non-oral communication for the disabled in South Africa’s poor, rural areas.
- Irina Chebakova, Russia. Hold annual marches to boost public support to save Russia’s protected natural areas.
- Tomas Diagne, Senegal. Save Senegal’s endangered land tortoises, Africa’s biggest, through a breeding sanctuary.
- Peter Knights, China. End the consumption of products from endangered species through public awareness campaigns.
- Karel Kolomaznik, Czech Republic. Improve technology to recover and recycle potentially toxic wastes from the leather industry.
- Adli Qudsi, Syria. Preserve Aleppo’s Old City from decay and modern development.
- Valerio Sbordoni, Mexico. Explore the remote caves and potholes of southern Mexico to discover new species.
- Alexander Stannus, United Kingdom. Develop an interactive circumnavigation of the planet’s inland waterways.

=== 2000 ===
==== Laureates ====
- Elizabeth Nicholls, Canada. Extract the fossilized remains of a 220 million-year-old marine fossil.
- Mohammed Bah Abba, Nigeria. Supply an innovative food cooling system to impoverished Nigerians.
- Maria Eliza Manteca Oñate, Ecuador. Promote sustainable farming in the Andes.
- Laurent Pordié, France. Promote Tibetan medicine to communities in Ladakh.
- David Schweidenback, United States. Redistribute used bicycles to developing countries.

==== Associate Laureates ====
- Luc-Henri Fage, France. Save ancient cave paintings in the caves of eastern Kalimantan, Borneo.
- Bernard Francou, France. Study a glacier to find the key to El Niño and global warming.
- Anabel Ford, United States. Re-establish Maya “forest gardens” as a model for conservation.
- Rohan Pethiyagoda, Sri Lanka. Protect Sri Lanka's biodiversity by reclaiming tracts of land to support endangered species.
- Reuven Yosef, Israel. Establish a sanctuary along the world's greatest migratory bird highway

=== 2002 ===
==== Laureates ====
- Michel André, France. Create a system to protect whales from collisions with ships.
- José Márcio Ayres, Brazil. Combine the protection of the Amazon forest with the human need for sustainable income.
- Dave Irvine-Halliday, Canada. Supply low-cost LED lighting systems to people in developing countries with no electricity supply.
- Lindy Rodwell, South Africa. Create a pan-African network to protect blue and wattled cranes.
- Gordon H. Sato, United States. Foster the mangrove tree as the basis of sustainable development in Eritrea.

==== Associate Laureates ====
- Sebastian Chuwa, Tanzania. Lead a massive reforestation project with the African blackwood to preserve the natural environment.
- Ilse Köhler-Rollefson, India. Use traditional and modern knowledge to save camels in Rajasthan while protecting the Raika way of life.
- Makoto Murase, Japan and Bangladesh. Recycle rainfall to solve urban water shortages and provide a safe, sustainable supply of water.
- Martha Isabel Ruiz Corzo, Mexico. Pioneer efforts to combine conservation with economic development in the Sierra Gorda Mountains.
- Geoffrey Summers, Turkey. Apply innovative archaeological methods to map and explore the Iron-Age city of Kerkenes

=== 2004 ===
==== Laureates ====
- Lonnie Dupre, United States. Raise awareness of global warming through an Arctic crossing.
- Claudia Feh, Switzerland. Reintroduce the endangered Przewalski horses to their native habitat in Mongolia and improve life for the local nomadic people.
- David Lordkipanidze, Georgia. Transform thought on human evolution through archaeological discoveries.
- Teresa Manera Argentina. Save a unique collection of prehistoric animal footprints.
- Kikuo Morimoto, Japan. Revive silk production in war-ravaged Cambodia.

==== Associate Laureates ====
- Pisit Charnsnoh, Thailand. Prevent the endangered dugong from vanishing from Thai waters by preserving its habitat.
- Laury Cullen Jr., Brazil. Transform farmers into conservationists to save the Atlantic Forest and its fauna in eastern Brazil.
- Shekar Dattatri, India. Save wild India through films by raising public and policy-makers’ awareness of environmental issues.
- Dora Nipp, Canada. Use oral testimonies to reconcile Canada with its social history.
- Jo Thompson, Congo (RDC). Rebuild a war-ravaged field base in the Congo to continue community-based conservation of the bonobo.

=== 2006 ===
==== Laureates ====
- Alexandra Lavrillier, Siberia. Establish a travelling school to revive a vanishing culture.
- Brad Norman, Australia. Create a system of identification to protect the whale shark.
- Pilai Poonswad, Thailand. Save threatened hornbills and their habitat in Thailand.
- Chanda Shroff, India. Revive traditional hand embroidery to create a sustainable income for women.
- Rory Wilson, United Kingdom. Use mobile technology to track how wild animals use energy.

==== Associate Laureates ====
- Cristian Donoso, Patagonia. Gather vital new knowledge about the little-known western Patagonia region.
- Zenón Gomel Apaza, Peru. Transform Andean communities through traditional agriculture.
- Shafqat Hussain, Pakistan. Develop a livestock insurance and ecotourism in Pakistan.
- Runa Khan, Bangladesh. Develop a “living museum” of traditional boats to preserve this national craft.
- Julien Meyer, France. Revive whistled and drummed languages from remote areas.

=== 2008 ===
==== Laureates ====
- Talal Akasheh, Jordan. Help conserve ancient Petra from the ravages of time and tourism.
- Tim Bauer, The Philippines. Reduce pollution from motorized tricycles in Asian cities.
- Andrew McGonigle, Italy. Develop a way to predict volcanic eruptions using a remote-controlled helicopter.
- Andrew Muir, South Africa. Provide training and jobs to young people orphaned by AIDS.
- Elsa Zaldívar, Paraguay. Combine loofah and plastic waste to make low-cost housing.

==== Associate Laureates ====
- Alexis Belonio, The Philippines. Turn rice husks into cheap, clean energy for cooking.
- Arthur González, Mexico. Explore submerged caves to discover and study remains from the Ice Age.
- Rodrigo Medellín, Mexico. Save endangered bats through protection and education.
- Moji Riba, India. Safeguard the heritage of the people of Arunachal Pradesh.
- Romulus Whitaker, United Kingdom/India. Establish a network of rainforest research stations across India.

=== 2010 ===
==== Young Laureates ====
- Jacob Colker, United States. Enable smartphone users to become volunteers by donating spare minutes to charitable, scientific and community organizations.
- Reese Fernandez-Ruiz, The Philippines. Help impoverished women earn a decent wage by upcycling waste, turning it into high-value “eco-ethical, elegant” products.
- Nnaemeka Ikegwuonu, Nigeria. Improve the lives of farmers in Nigeria through the development of an interactive, rural radio service.
- Piyush Tewari, India. Train a network of police officers and volunteers to provide rapid medical care to road accident victims in Delhi.
- Bruktawit Tigabu, Ethiopia. Tackle the high child mortality rate in Ethiopia through a television series designed to teach children about health.

=== 2012 ===
==== Laureates ====
- Sergei Bereznuk, Russian Federation. Protect the last of the Siberian tigers in Russia's Far East.
- Barbara Block, United States. Track marine predators, such as tuna, and protect the oceans.
- Erika Cuéllar, Bolivia. Train local people in the Chaco region of South America to protect the biodiversity of this environment.
- Mark Kendall, Australia. Revolutionize vaccinations with a needle-free Nanopatch to save millions of lives.
- Aggrey Otieno, Kenya. Build a telemedicine centre in a slum to save the lives of mothers and babies.

==== Young Laureates ====
- Karina Atkinson, United Kingdom. Foster research and responsible tourism in a bio-diversity hotspot.
- Selene Biffi, Italy. Revive traditional storytelling to craft a new narrative for Afghanistan.
- Maritza Morales Casanova, Mexico. Build a park for environmental education in the Yucatán.
- Sumit Dagar, India. Develop a Braille smartphone to improve life for India's blind people.
- Arun Krishnamurthy, India. Restore urban lakes in India

=== 2014 ===
==== Young Laureates ====
- Neeti Kailas, India, Develop a system to carry out mass screenings of newborns in resource-poor settings to monitor hearing loss.
- Olivier Nsengimana, Rwanda, Save Rwanda's Grey Crowned Crane, which faces increasing threats, in order to conserve the country's biodiversity.
- Francesco Sauro, Italy, Lead a team to explore ancient caves in table-top mountains between Venezuela and Brazil and uncover the secrets of the planet's evolution.
- Arthur Zang, Cameroon, Invent Africa's first medical computer tablet to help diagnose people with heart disease.
- Hosam Zowawi, Saudi Arabia, Develop faster laboratory tests for superbugs and raise awareness of antibiotic resistance in the Gulf States through an education campaign.

=== 2016 ===
==== Laureates ====
- Andrew Bastawrous, Ireland. Transform eye care in sub-Saharan Africa using a smartphone-based, portable eye examination kit.
- Sonam Wangchuk, India. Assist farmers in Ladakh, the arid Himalayan highlands in India to overcome water shortages by tapping meltwaters to build artificial glaciers.
- Vreni Häussermann, Chile. Explore Chilean Patagonia's remote fjords to document unknown life at the bottom of the sea.
- Kerstin Forsberg, Peru. Protect threatened giant manta rays by working with local communities to promote awareness and appreciation of these gentle giants.
- Conor Walsh, Australia. Revolutionize how patients worldwide recover from traumas such as stroke and learn to walk again by marrying textile science with robotics.

==== Young Laureates ====
- Joseph Cook, United Kingdom. Explore and communicate how polar ice micro-organisms help shape our world.
- Oscar Ekponimo, Nigeria. Minimize food waste through an application that manages the end of shelf life, allowing food to be sold at a discount.
- Christine Keung, United States. Empower rural women to tackle rural pollution in northwest China with a system for disposing of toxic waste.
- Junto Ohki, Japan. Improve communication among deaf people by expanding a crowdsourced, online sign-language dictionary that will become a global platform.
- Sarah Toumi, Tunisia. Fight desertification caused by climate change and reduce poverty among farmers through reforestation.

=== 2019 ===
==== Laureates ====
- João Campos-Silva, Brazil. Recover giant arapaima populations and ensure sustainable development in the Amazon.
- Grégoire Courtine, France. Reverse paralysis in humans by re-establishing communication across spinal cord injury using an electronic bridge.
- Brian Gitta, Uganda. Develop a low-cost diagnostic test for malaria that does not require a blood sample.
- Krithi Karanth, India. Improve human-wildlife interactions by engaging communities and mitigating threats from wildlife.
- Miranda Wang, United States. Recycle the unrecyclable by producing useful by-products from plastic waste.

==== Associate Laureates ====
- Emma Camp, Australia. Pioneer new hope for the world’s fast-vanishing corals through reef recovery.
- Pablo García Borboroglu, Argentina. Conduct research, education and management activities to advance penguin conservation.
- Yves Moussallam, Melanesia. Explore how remote Pacific volcanoes affect the world's climate.
- Sara Saeed, Pakistan. Empower female doctors in Pakistan to digitally deliver healthcare to impoverished communities.
- Topher White, Ecuador. Use mobile technology to protect rainforests and fight climate change.

=== 2021 ===
==== Laureates ====
- Felix Brooks-church, Tanzania. Eradicate malnutrition through a ‘dosifier’ adding micronutrients to fortify staple foods.
- Hindou Oumarou Ibrahim, Chad. Use indigenous knowledge to map resources and prevent conflict around climate in the Sahel.
- Rinzin Phunjok Lama, Nepal. Promote local initiatives for biodiversity conservation in Nepal’s trans-Himalaya region.
- Gina Moseley, Greenland. Explore and study the world’s northern-most caves for new insights into climate change in the Arctic.
- Luiz Rocha, Maldives. Explore and protect the Indian Ocean’s deep coral reefs.

=== 2023 ===
==== Laureates ====
- Beth Koigi, Kenya. Extract water from the air with atmospheric water generators to alleviate drinking water shortages.
- Inza Koné, Côte d’Ivoire. Protecting Africa's forests with community-managed natural reserves.
- Liu Shaochuang, Mongolia and China. Monitoring critically-endangered wild camels herds in the Gobi Desert with satellite technology.
- Constantino Aucca Chutas, Peru. Community-led reforestation in the High Andes.
- Denica Riadini-Flesch, Indonesia. Traditionally crafted clothing from materials grown using regenerative agriculture.

== See also ==
- Rolex Mentor and Protégé Arts Initiative, a sister project
