= Central Philippine University =

Private university in Iloilo City, Philippines

- Pamantasang Sentral ng Pilipinas (Filipino)
- The university seal
- Former names: Jaro Industrial School (1905–1923); Central Philippine School (1923–1936); Central Philippine College (1936–1953)
- Motto: Scientia et Fides (Latin)
- Motto in English: Science and Faith
- Founder: William O. Valentine
- Benefactor: John D. Rockefeller
- Type: Private, non-profit, research, and coeducational basic and higher education institution
- Established: October 1, 1905; 121 years ago
- Religious affiliation: In concordat with the Convention of Philippine Baptist Churches but independent and non-sectarian
- Academic affiliations: ACUCA, UBCHEA, ACSCU, PAASCU, ATESEA, SEAMEO Schools Network
- Chairman: Matt P. Palabrica, Ph.D.
- President: Ernest Howard Dagohoy, M.Div., D.Min.
- Students: 15,093 (September 2024)
- Location: Jaro, Iloilo City, Iloilo, Philippines; 10°43′49″N 122°32′56″E
- Campus: • Main [Urban] (Jaro, Iloilo City) – 24 ha (59 acres); • Other External Campuses and Lands (total land area) – 168.13 ha (415.5 acres)^{[b]}; • CPU–Iloilo Mission Hospital [Medical Center] (Jaro, Iloilo City) – 3 ha (7.4 acres)
- Newspaper: The Central Echo
- Alma Mater song: Central, My Central
- Colors: Gold and Blue
- Nickname: CPU Golden Lions
- Sporting affiliations: PRISAA, UNIGAMES, WVRAA, ISSA
- Website: www.cpu.edu.ph
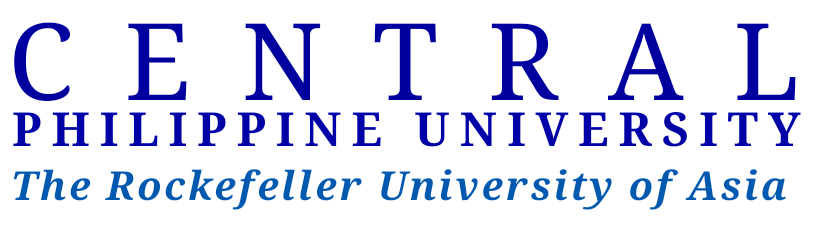

- Location in the Visayas Location in the Philippines

University rankings

Global – Overall
- THE World: 1501+ (2025) THE Impact Rankings 2025

Regional – Overall
- QS Asia: 851-900 (2025) 153 (2025) QS South Eastern Asia

National – Overall
- QS National: 14 (2025) 1 (2025) Western Visayas

Central Philippine University (also known as Central or CPU) is a private Protestant research university in Iloilo City, Philippines. Established in 1905 through a grant from the American industrialist and philanthropist John D. Rockefeller, as the Jaro Industrial School and Bible School under the supervision of the American Baptist Foreign Mission Society, it is "the first Baptist and the second American and Protestant-founded university in the Philippines and in Asia".

The university pioneered nursing education in the Philippines through the establishment of the Union Mission Hospital Training School for Nurses (now CPU College of Nursing) in 1906, the first nursing school in the Philippines. It also established the first student government in Southeast Asia, the CPU Republic (1906); the first government-recognized agricultural school outside of Luzon, the CPU College of Agriculture, Resources and Environmental Sciences; the first Baptist and second Protestant theological seminary in the country, the CPU College of Theology (1905), and the first Protestant and American hospital in the Philippines, the CPU–Iloilo Mission Hospital (1901).

The university has been granted full autonomy status by the Commission on Higher Education (Philippines), the same government agency that recognized its academic programs as National Centers of Excellence in Agriculture and Business Administration, and as National Centers of Development in Chemical Engineering, Electrical Engineering, Electronics Engineering, and Teacher Education. It is also an ISO Certified Institution.

Central has been recognized globally, ranking among the top universities in the Philippines and worldwide by two notable international university ranking agencies, Quacquarelli Symonds (QS) and Times Higher Education (THE). It has also been ranked by the World University Ranking for Innovations (WURI). In addition, AppliedHE recognized Central as one of the top private universities in Southeast Asia and Asia.

CPU's main campus is a Registered Cultural Property by the National Commission for Culture and the Arts and a Marked Historical Site by the National Historical Commission of the Philippines. The Hinilawod Epic Chant Recordings, housed at the university's Henry Luce III Library, has been inscribed in the UNESCO Memory of the World Register.

At present, the university is consist of eighteen schools and colleges offering academic programs from basic education up to baccalaureate and graduate studies. In tertiary education level, it offers courses in Agriculture and Environmental Sciencess, Accounting and Business Administration, Biology and Chemistry, Computer Studies, Engineering, Hospitality and Tourism Management, Law, Liberal Arts and Sciences, Library Science, Mass Communication, Medical Laboratory Science, Medicine, Nursing, Pharmacy, Political Science, Public Administration, Psychology, Teacher Education, and Theology.

The university administers the Fortress College in Kabankalan City, Negros Occidental and maintains overseas academic programs with Thai Nguyen University of Economics and Business Administration (TUEBA) in Vietnam.

Central's alumni include Filipino senators, congressmen, and legal luminaries; National Artists of the Philippines; laureates of notable awards like Ramon Magsaysay Award and Rolex Award for Enterprise; presidential cabinet members, military officials; provincial governors and city mayors; and business tycoons.

== History ==
=== Incorporation and founding ===
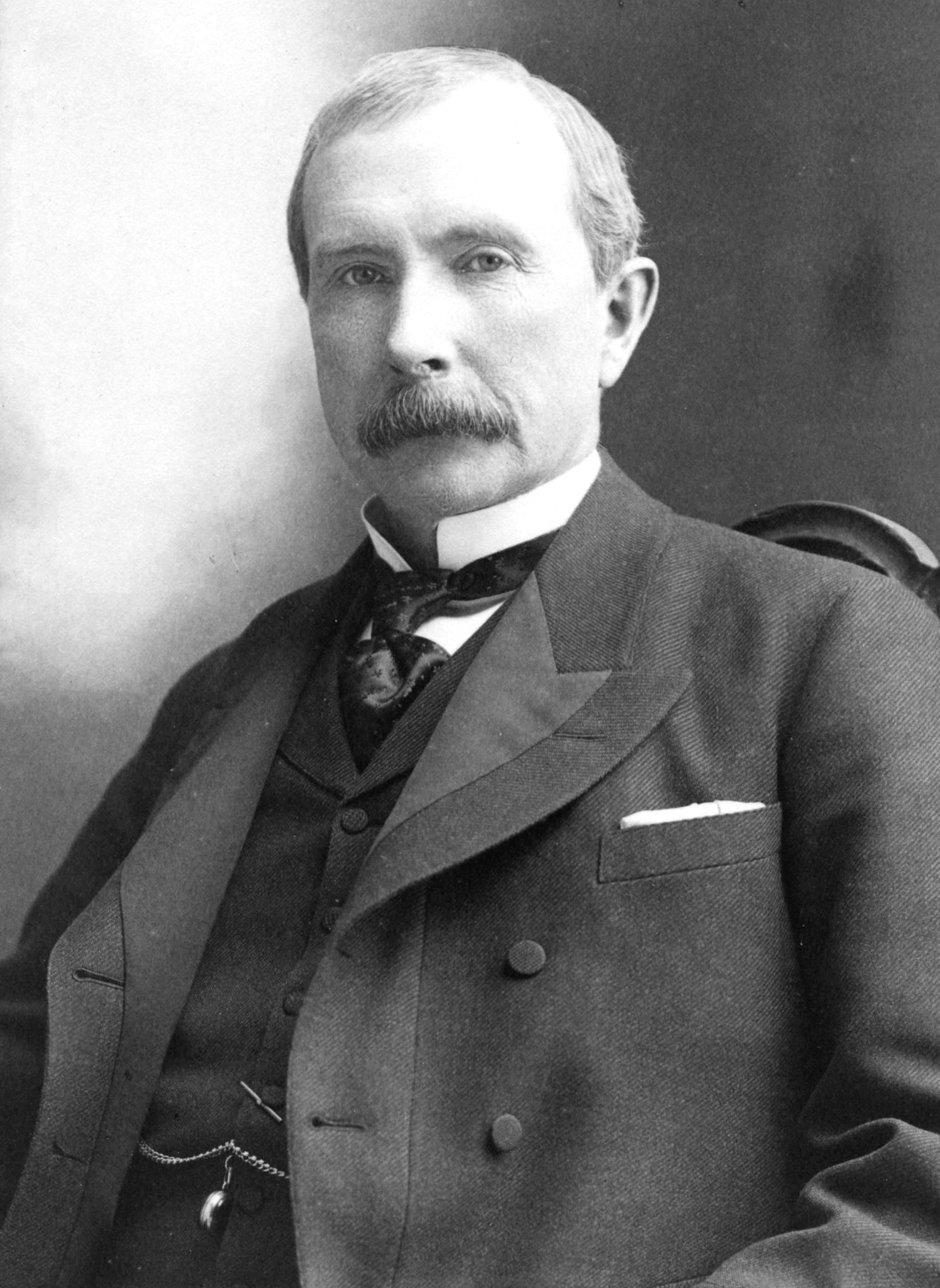
John D. Rockefeller, an American industrialist, philanthropist, and devout Baptist is Central's main benefactor. His benevolent grant to the American Baptist Foreign Mission Society for the purpose of establishing schools that will train ministers and other Christian workers and for boys in the Philippines, resulted to the founding of Central Philippine University.

In the early 20th century when the Philippines was opened to the American Protestant missionaries after the Philippines was ceded by Spain to the United States through the 1898 Treaty of Paris after the Spanish–American War, a comity agreement by the Protestant American churches was established that the Philippine islands will be divided into mission territories, thus the Western Visayan region went to the jurisdiction of the Baptists.

The origins of Central Philippine University dates back in 1901 when the American Northern Baptists, through its foreign mission board, the American Baptist Foreign Mission Society, laid a plan to establish mission schools following the comity agreement of the division of the islands for the evangelical mission and through a benevolent grant given by John D. Rockefeller, an American industrialist and philanthropist. Rockefeller himself was a devoted Northern Baptist with numerous church related philanthropy works throughout his life, that is why he gave a grant to the Northern Baptists that resulted in the establishment of Central.

On the other hand, in 1901 also, four years before the founding of Central in 1905, alongside when the American Baptists came in Iloilo, the Presbyterians came and they established the Union Mission Hospital (Sabine Haines Memorial Union Mission Hospital) (which Central, since its founding until this day is closely associated with as its university hospital) under the Presbyterian Church in the United States by Joseph Andrew Hall, it is the first Protestant and American hospital in the Philippines. Since the hospital's founding, Presbyterians worked closely with the Baptists for the operation of the hospital. Following the years since its founding, in 1925, its administration was eventually transferred to the Baptists who also bought the land in the City of Jaro (now part and a district of Iloilo City) where the hospital now stands. The hospital was later renamed to Iloilo Mission Hospital in 1932. The hospital predates the schools founding by four years. It also serves since then as the hospital of Central. The hospital pioneered the Nursing education in the Philippines when it established the Union Mission Hospital Training School for Nurses (the present Central Philippine University College of Nursing) in 1906. The school also produced the first graduate nurses in the country.

The Jaro Evangelical Church was founded in 1900 by American Baptist Missionaries as "the first Baptist church in the Philippines" and the "first Protestant church outside Manila". It has been closely associated with Central, acting as a catalyst for its founding in 1905. Before the creation of the CPU Church, the early students of the university would go to this church every Sunday to worship.

Then in 1903, there will be two schools that will be established by the mission: an industrial school for boys and a Bible school to train pastors and other Christian workers was incorporated. Later, it was voted on December 2, 1904, to finally establish the two schools. The task to found both schools was given to William O. Valentine, an American missionary, who became the first principal and president with the help of the other co-founders. Valentine was in the service of the American Baptist Foreign Mission Society, where he first ministered as a missionary in Burma, first in Rangoon, then in Mandalay, where he became the principal of the Baptist Mission High School for Boys in 1895. The new mission was given to him by the mission society in 1903. During his eighth year in Burma he suffered severe sunstroke and returned to America for treatment. There he met his future wife, nurse Ina Jane Van Allen. Valentine and Van Allen were married in 1903 and the couple left for his new appointment in Iloilo in the Philippines.

The establishment of the Baptist Missionary Training School and the Jaro Industrial School is associated with the first Baptist church in the Philippine Islands, the Jaro Evangelical Church, which was established on February 28, 1900, by the Northern American Baptists also, now the American Baptist Churches. On June 1, 1905, the Bible School opened in the home of the Valentines under the auspices of the American Baptist Foreign Mission Society from the United States along with other missionaries that are considered as co-founders. There were 12 pupils with some "Bible Women" who attended as auditors.

The benevolent grant given by the industrialist and oil magnate John D. Rockefeller was used to provide the school the facilities during the school's establishment along with the industrial school (which was later established in the fall of 1905) and to purchase a 24-hectare piece of land in the City of Jaro (now a part of Iloilo City) where Central's main campus is located at present.

In the fall of 1905, the Jaro Industrial School was opened as a free vocational boarding school for poor boys. The first class consisted of 20 boys who worked four hours a day to pay their tuition, room and board, and spent four hours in the classroom. One of the school's innovations was the adoption of student self-government, the first in the South East Asia, known today as Central Philippine University Republic, which is modeled on American civil government. Dr. William Orison Valentine, worked for its incorporation and recognition by the Philippine government.

A year later when Jaro Industrial School was established, one of the school's innovations was the adoption of student self-government which is modeled on American civil government, the Jaro Industrial School Republic. The Republic continues to this day as the Central Philippine University Republic. It still holds the distinction as the oldest student governing body in South East Asia. The original purpose of the founding of the industrial school for boys was quoted a century later in 2005 during the centennial celebrations of the university:

"The original purpose of the school (Jaro Industrial School) was to provide opportunity for poor Filipino boys to receive a good Christian education by working their way through school. Actual work experience and earnest study of the Bible were the core of the curriculum."

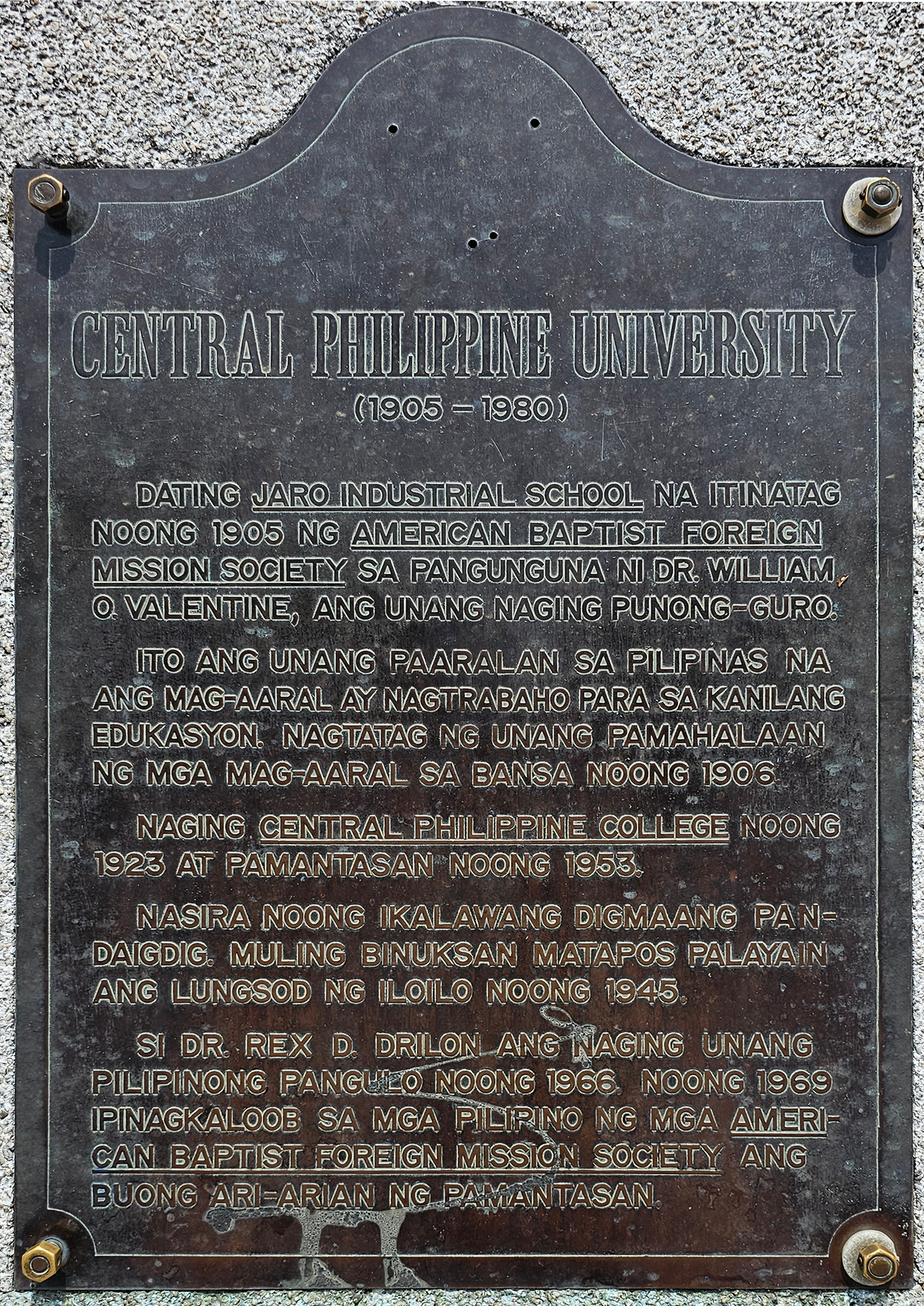
The National Historical Institute of the Philippines historical marker at Central's main campus installed in 1980.

Later, the leadership of the Bible School was turned over to the Reverend Henry Munger, who conducted classes off campus. In 1907, Reverend William Valentine became and tenured again as head of the Jaro Industrial School. By 1907 during his term, there were 300 boys working an active farm and in various trades. All of these students were required to live on campus. In 1907 also, the Bible School split off under a separate principal, Dr. Eric Lund. Classes were held at the Mission Press building where Lund was doing his Scripture translation work.

In 1910, independent student media at the Jaro Industrial School created the first official student publication, The Hoe (the present Central Echo). It is now one of the oldest student publications in the Philippines.

The Reverend William Valentine, the founder and first president of Central.

In 1912, Dr. Lund left the Baptist Missionary Training School and it was closed. Following that year, in 1913, Dr. Valentine's objectives were realized and in the same year the Jaro Industrial School also admitted its first female student; it was fully incorporated then by the Philippine government and enrolled 740 students. Then in 1915, Jaro Industrial School opened its first high school program, starting with first and second year classes, adding third and fourth year classes in 1920. As both two schools were founded by the Northern American Baptists from the American Baptist Churches, ordination for women is affirmed that resulted and eventually in 1917, the Jaro Industrial School elected its first female head and Principal, Mary J. Thomas, who tenured as a principal of the Jaro Industrial School from 1917 to 1918. The Baptist Missionary Training School later, however, was reopened in 1913 by Rev. Alton Bigelow. It was under Rev. Alton Bigelow's leadership that the Bible School began to have a definite direction in its development. In 1921, the following year after the Jaro Industrial School added fourth year high school classes, the school graduated its first high school batch.

The first Board of Trustees which was formed a year earlier before the founding of the two schools, is composed of five members from the mission conference which are selected by the mission conference in annual session. They remained American in composition until prior to the conversion of the Jaro Industrial School as a junior college. In the early years of the school's operation, building up qualified faculty and staff had been a great challenge. Some missionaries gave part-time service and Dr. David S. Hibbard, founder of the Silliman Institute, now Silliman University, also provided Filipino instructors who had trained at Silliman Institute.

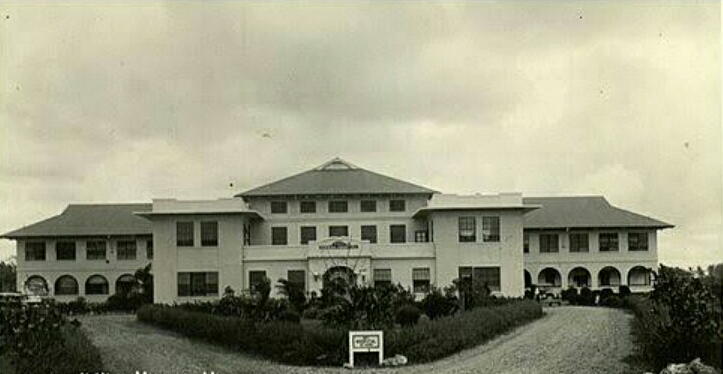
The Central Philippine University–Iloilo Mission Hospital Main Hall in its new location in 1931 in the City of Jaro (now a present district of Iloilo City). Founded in 1901 by Presbyterian missionary doctor Joseph Andrew Hall, it is the first American and Protestant hospital in the Philippines.

To accommodate the need for tertiary education in the area, a junior college was opened in 1923 and the name of the school was changed to Central Philippine College. In April of the following year, the Baptist Missionary Training School became an organic part of the junior college. The senior college opened in 1936 and by 1940 five degrees were offered: Bachelor of Arts, Bachelor of Science, Bachelor of Education, Bachelor of Theology and Bachelor of Religious Education.

When the junior college became a senior college in 1936, the College of Engineering was also established.

In 1938, Baptist Missionary Training School (BMST) for women which was established independently on October 20, 1905, became part of the theology department of the college. In the same year also, students and interested sectors of the school began to press for the opening of a law school. Finally, on March 18, 1939, the board of trustees voted to apply for a permit to offer the first two years of the law course. It opened in the school year 1939–1940.

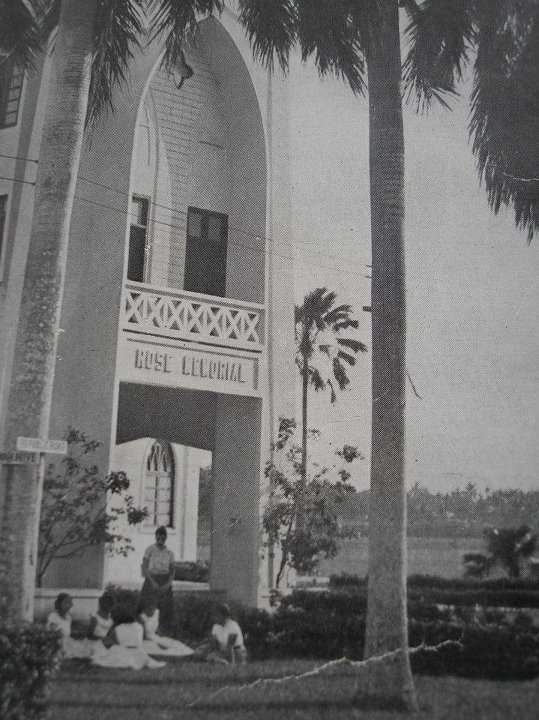
The old Rose Memorial Hall in 1965.

Attorney Pablo Oro, who had been one of the leaders in urging this move and in seeking patrons to help develop the law library, was given the responsibility for developing the program. Pablo Oro, a member of the Philippine Bar, was a graduate of Silliman University and of the University of Manila College of Law.

On September 19, 1931, the Union Mission Hospital started admitting and treating patients at its present location on Mission Road. The hospital plant occupied a lot of 29,283 meters or approximately 3 hectares in area. On October 21, 1931, became a joyous day. The new relocated hospital was dedicated with its founder, Dr. Joseph Andrew Hall came all the way from Tacloban City, Leyte, as the guest of honor on the said momentous occasion. Dr. Precy Grigg lost no time in developing the new hospital's buildings and its surroundings. On what used to be a deep rice field and swampy place was a green lawn and rose garden surrounding the new imposing and neat-looking concrete hospital. After office hours, Dr. Grigg loved to work on landscaping the surroundings with plants secured from the islands of Negros and Panay.

On March 5, 1932, Union Mission Hospital (UMH) became the Iloilo Mission Hospital (IMH). Likewise the training school was renamed Iloilo Mission Hospital Training School for Nurses (IMHTSN). The hospital onwards continued to grow. It drew students from many parts of the Philippine islands who came to apply for admission to the training school for nurses.

=== World War II ===
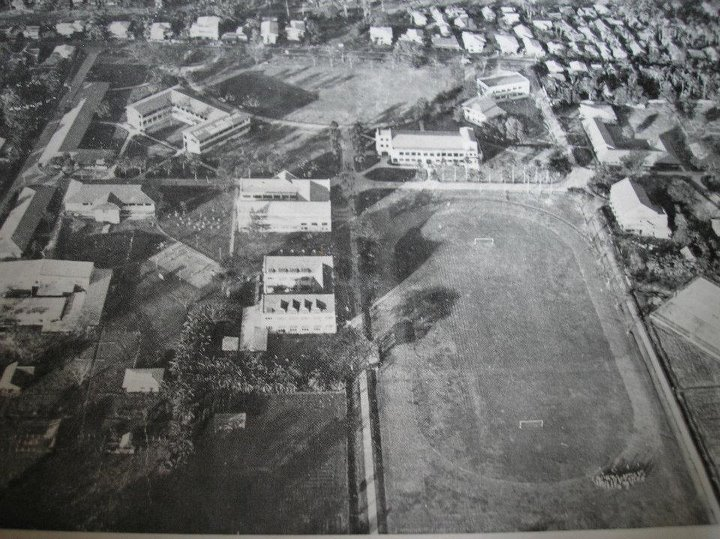
Aerial view of the part of Central's main campus in the north-eastern side in the early 1960s. During World War II, Central's entire properties, was heavily damaged.

Academic life in the campus was interrupted when invading Japanese forces landed in Iloilo. As a consequence of the invasion, missionaries assigned at Central fled and took refuge in the mountain barrios of Katipunan, Tapaz, Capiz. They hid in the forest they called "Hopevale" with the help of their Filipino friends. They were eventually captured by the Japanese troops on December 19, 1943. The missionaries begged them to free the Filipino captives and instead offered themselves as ransom. At the dawn of December 20, 1943, the missionaries asked to be allowed to pray and, an hour later, they told their Japanese captors they were ready to die. The adults were beheaded and the children were bayoneted.

The missionaries who died in the massacre are today called the Hopevale Martyrs. The martyrs are: Dr. Francis Howard Rose (former president and head of Central), Jeanie Clare Adams, Prof. James Howard Clovell, Charma Moore Clovell, Dorothy Antoinette Dowell, Signe Amelia Erikson, Dr. Frederick Willer-Meyer, Ruth Schatch Meyer, Gertrude Coombs Rose, Rev. Erle Frederich Rounds, Louise Cummings Rounds, and Erle Douglas. Despite the order that these Americans should go home because of the war, they refused to leave their mission and eventually sacrificed their lives.

On the day Pearl Harbor was bombed on in December 1941, the American Baptist Foreign Mission and its affiliate Woman's American Baptist Foreign Mission Society had 21 missionaries in the Philippine islands. The mission works of the American Baptists had been rocked during the height of the World War II. On December 15, 1941, the two mission hospitals run by the mission on Panay – Iloilo Mission Hospital and Capiz Emmanuel Hospital, began to work in full co-operation with the United States Armed Forces. By January 1942, Manila had fallen in the hands of the Japanese Imperial Army and had become clear that they would come to Panay. The two hospitals moved to separate inland areas, the Capiz Emmanuel Hospital to Dumalag, Capiz and the Iloilo Mission Hospital to Calinog, Iloilo where, April 1942, they continued to operate under their regular missionary and Filipino staffmen drawing more heavily on the armed forces for equipment and supplies.

=== Post-war years and reconstruction ===
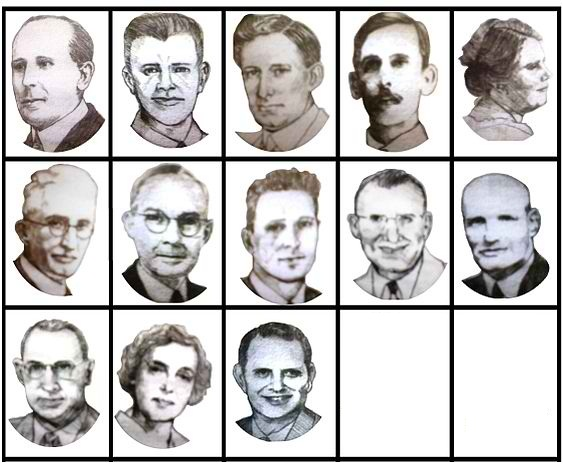
Principals and Presidents of Central Philippine University (which are all Americans) from its founding until 1966 when Rex D. Drilon became the first Filipino president.

After the war ended, the college was reopened by the remaining members of the faculty and by returning missionaries. When the Second World War broke out, the college's buildings were destroyed. Reconstruction was made possible through funds from friends at home and abroad.

The college's Graduate School was formally opened in 1951 with Dr. Linnea A. Nelson as dean. Dr. Nelson, holder of an Ed.D degree from the University of California, Berkeley, had been a missionary in China from 1935 to 1949. Since its founding, the graduate school has been chosen by the fund for Assistance to Private Education (FAPE) as a graduate center for MBA, MA in English and Master of Engineering for the following fields of specialization: civil engineering, chemical engineering, electrical engineering, and mechanical engineering.

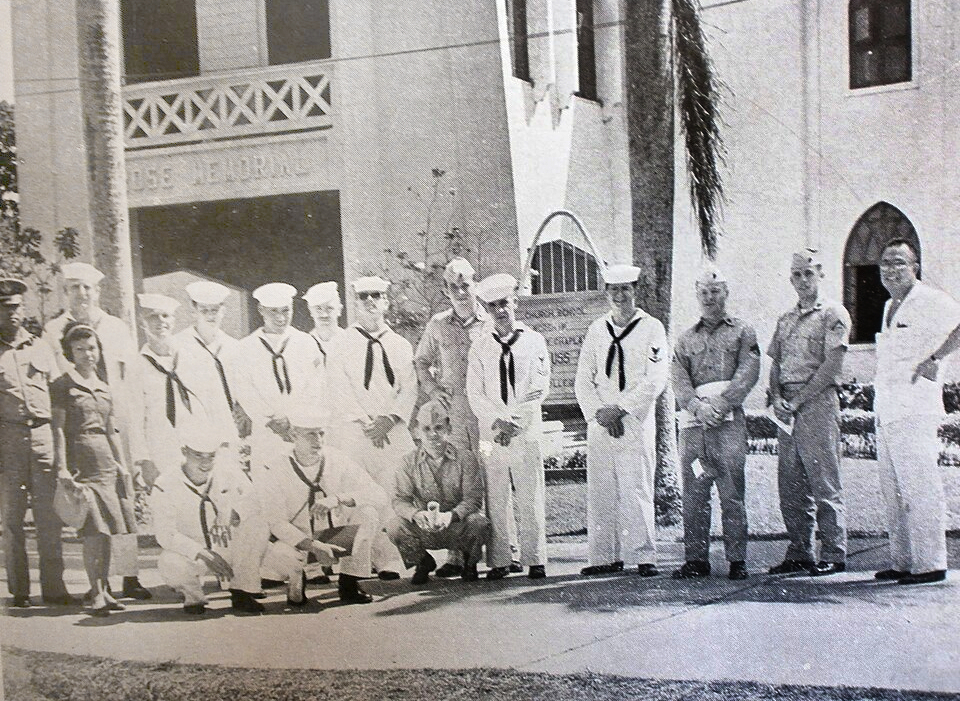
United States Navy personnel drop in at the main campus whenever a ship comes to the Port of Iloilo.

When the war ended, Dr. Henry S. Waters, the postwar director of Iloilo Mission Hospital and also principal of the Iloilo Mission Hospital School of Nursing in 1946–1947, pressed for the offering, with Central Philippine College (the forerunner of Central Philippine University), a collegiate course leading to the Bachelor of Science in Nursing degree. The director of the Bureau of Private Schools and the members of the board of examiners for nurses authorized the opening of the Bachelor of Science in Nursing four-year course in 1947 that resulted the school's operation transferred to the college.

Dr. Waters served as acting dean of the new College of Nursing at Central Philippine College (1947–1948). When he returned to the United States, Dr. Teofilo Marte served as the executive secretary (1948–1949). Loreto D. Tupaz, who finished her Bachelor of Science in Nursing degree at CPU, was the acting dean from 1949 to 1950 and served in this capacity until the arrival of Esther Salzman, Master of Science in Nursing and an American Baptist Foreign Mission Society missionary nurse, who held the deanship from 1950 to 1961. During her term, the college offered three curricular programs: the Bachelor of Science in Nursing four-year course, the GN-Bachelor of Science in Nursing Supplemental Course and the Bachelor of Science in Nursing five-year course.

Tupaz and Salzman worked together to develop Central Philippine College of Nursing (later the Central Philippine University College of Nursing) into a college of distinction, recognized both in the Philippines and abroad. Salzman served as dean until 1961 when she retired in the United States. Lily Plagata, MSN, was appointed to the deanship (1961–1974). When she resigned and went abroad, she was replaced by Carmen Centeno, Master of Science, for the remaining months of 1963. Centeno, however, also left for the United States, and Loreto D. Tupaz, who finished her MA degree at CPU, resumed the deanship (1963–1970), assisted by Maria Pablico, MSN (1969–1970). Pablico also resigned to work in the United States from 1963 to 1973. Tupaz continued to administer the three course programs of the college, the Bachelor of Science in Nursing five-year course, the CCT (Clinical Teaching) course, and the Bachelor of Science in Nursing Supplemental Course.

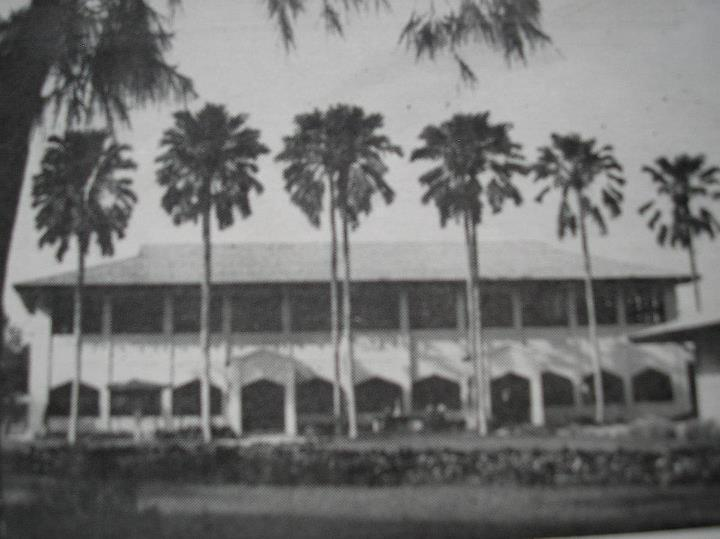
Eugenio Lopez Memorial Hall in the 1960s. The structure, donated by the Spanish Filipino business magnate and philanthropist Eugenio Lopez, Sr., used to be the main library of Central and is the first permanent building on the main campus.

Post world war pushed for the expansion of the university's programs including in the field of healthcare sciences. In 1947 saw the need for CPU to open a dentistry and pharmacy programs.

The plan for a College of Pharmacy was presented by Mr. Plagata in response, as he said, "to insistent demands from a number of students." He reported that an outlay of 9,000 pesos would cover the initial cost because some equipment was already available in the Chemistry Department. The board voted to apply for a permit for the first two years if the college administration found it feasible. The administration at once made formal application for the permit, and this was given by the Bureau. The third year in Pharmacy was opened in 1948, and by 1949 four years of Pharmacy was offered, with Carmelina Jalbuena as dean.

Mr. Plagata reported that Dr. Emilio Gatanela, a prominent practicing dentist, had encouraged the Faculty Council to propose a College of Dentistry in response to requests for its opening, after pointing out that such program would not necessitate considerable outlay. He stated that local dentists could be employed as instructors and they would lend their equipment. In it was voted to open the College of Dentistry. In early 1950s however due to the cost the university may cover for its expansion for a modern school of dentistry, it was formally closed.

On April 1, 1953, the college gained government recognition and was given a university charter, converting the college into what is now known as the Central Philippine University.

In July 1955, the Hon. Robert Simmons, the former chief justice of the Nebraska State Court, visited the campus and lectured to the students. He became very much interested in the former law school dean Atty. Pablo Oro and the College of Law. Justice Simmons gave generous support to the law school's library and encouraged his friends and colleagues to do the same.

In 1965, Central's College of Engineering offered a one-year sanitary engineering course with three graduates. One could only enroll in this course after completing the civil engineering course. However, this restriction was abolished later due to an insufficient number of enrollees. In 1956, after three years when the college received a university charter from the Philippine government, the first female president, Linnea A. Nelson, was elected.

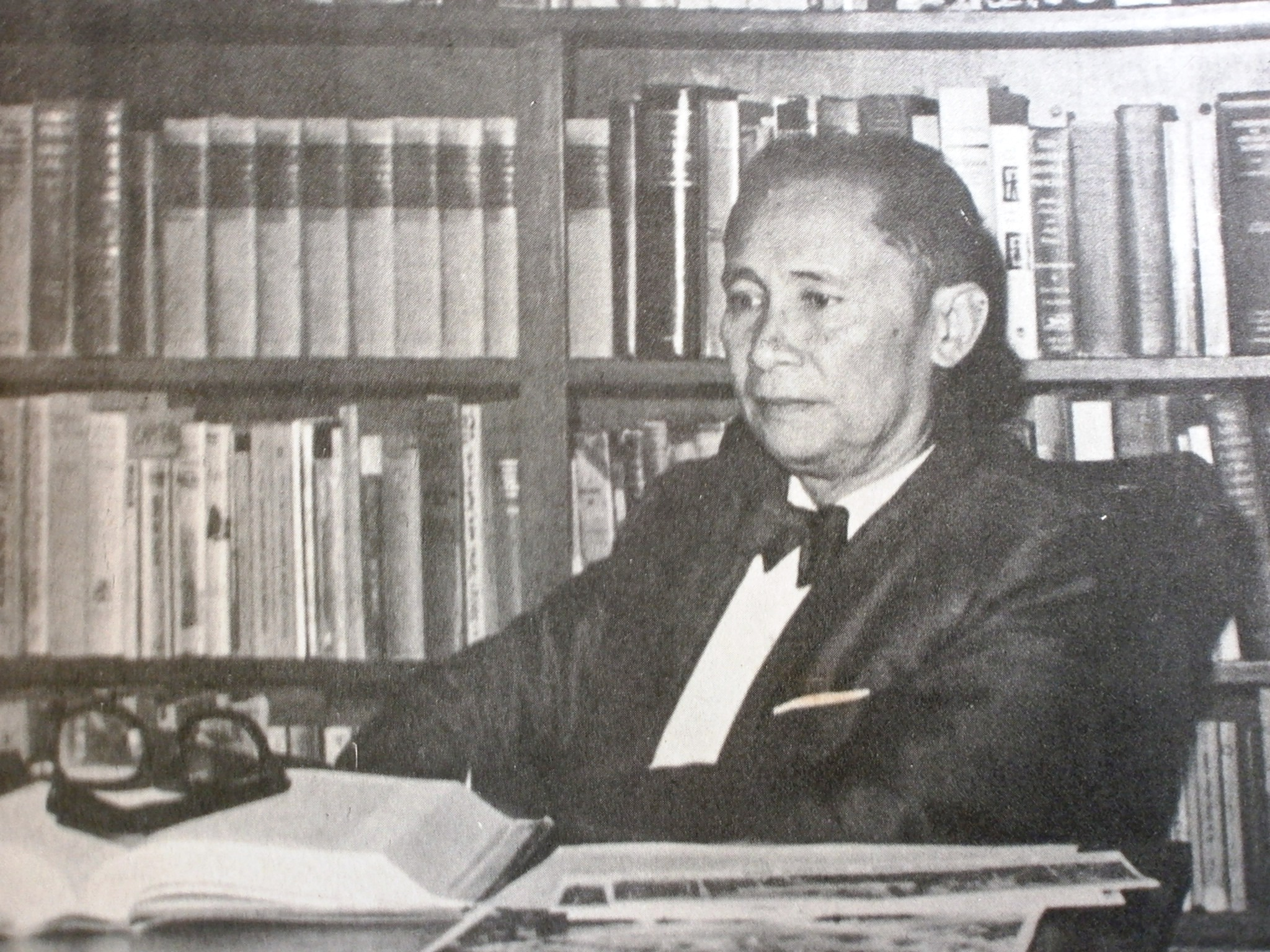
Rex D. Drilon, the first Filipino president of Central

On the other hand, Linnea Nelson became the first female university president, she was the person behind the establishment of the School of Graduate Studies back in 1951, where she was the first dean of the school. Nelson is an Ed.D degree holder from the University of California, Berkeley, and had been a missionary in China from 1935 to 1949. She served as the president of Central from 1956 to 1957 and was again re-elected in 1965–1966.

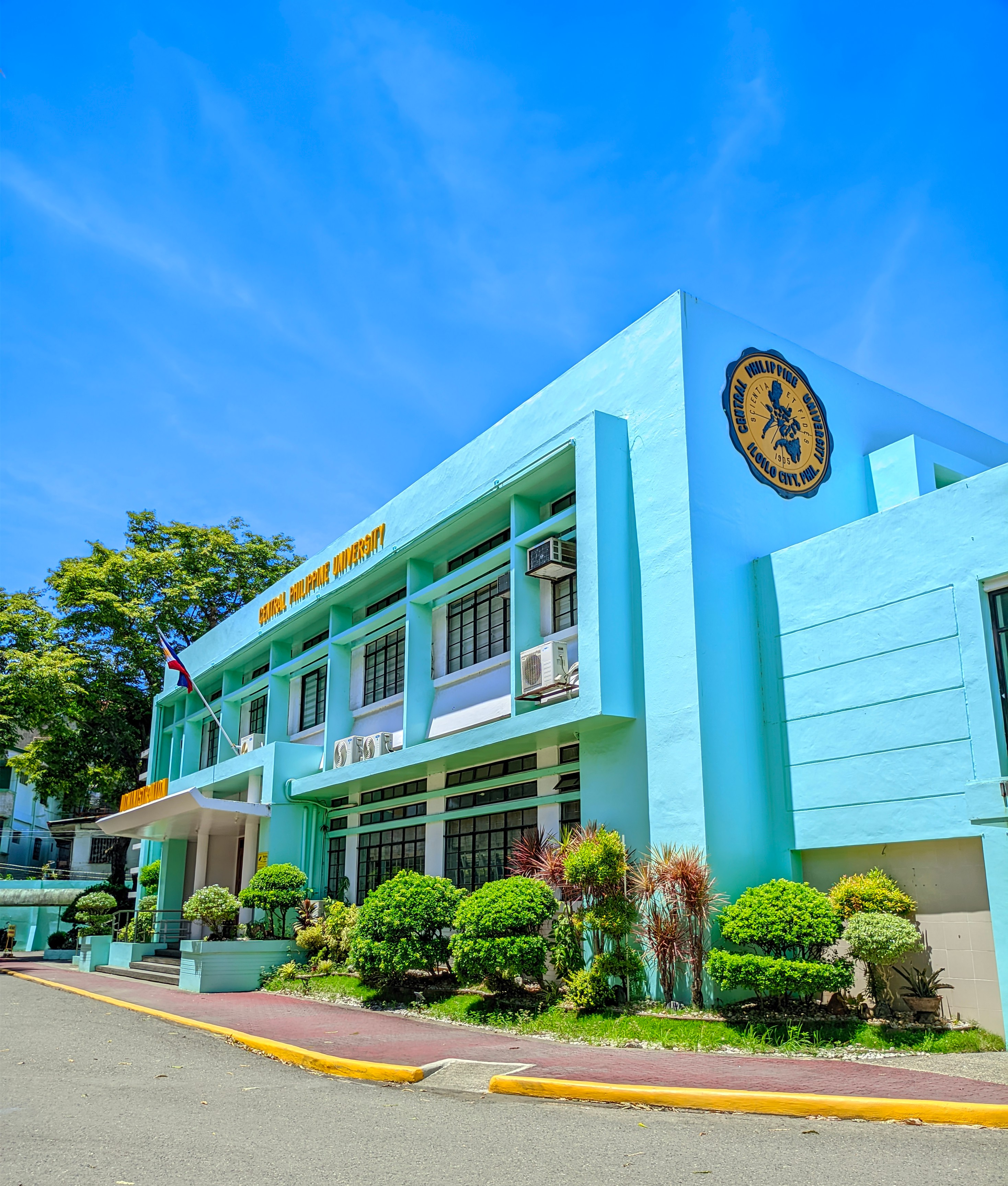
The Dr. Rex D. Drilon Hall (Administration Building) is one of the modern-style halls at CPU and is named after the university's first Filipino president, Rex Divinagracia Drilon.

From its founding, Filipinos were gradually given larger responsibilities in its administration. In 1966 the first Filipino president, Dr. Rex D. Drilon, a CPU alumnus and a political scientist from the University of the Philippines Diliman, was elected. Dr. Drilon began initiatives for the Filipinization of the university, and made a trip to the United States for the purpose. The American Baptist Foreign Mission Society consented to transfer the multi-million university properties to the Filipinos in consonance with the Foreign Mission policy of "Americans receding and Filipinos advancing". Thus, in 1968 the entire university property – land, buildings, and equipment – was turned over by the American Baptist Foreign Mission Society to the Filipino corporation of CPU. Since 1973, all members of the board of trustees and administrative officials of the university have been Filipinos.

=== 1990s to 2008 ===
In 1998 until 2008, the 3rd Filipino president of the university, Dr. Juanito Acanto term was dubbed as Years of Bliss: Years of Fulfillment, where academic and infrastructural developments flourished in the university, through help from the alumni. It was in his term also, when the university started a goal to raise 100 million Php and as planned, the campaign started in September 2001 until December 2005. The CPU Centennial Development Fund alone raised a total of 75,000,000 pesos from 182 Endowment programs. The helpful endeavor through other endowment fund programs, which started years back, was intensified and is still ongoing, with a total of 433 Endowment Funds, amounting to 127,500,000 pesos until May of his last year term as the university president in 2007; celebrated its centennial year in 2005, where thousands of alumni from the world came home. The university's centennial celebration and followed by the foundation day on October 1 owes a lot to the American founders and missionaries who founded and sacrificed for Central, especially to the Reverend William Valentine, the founding father of the institution.

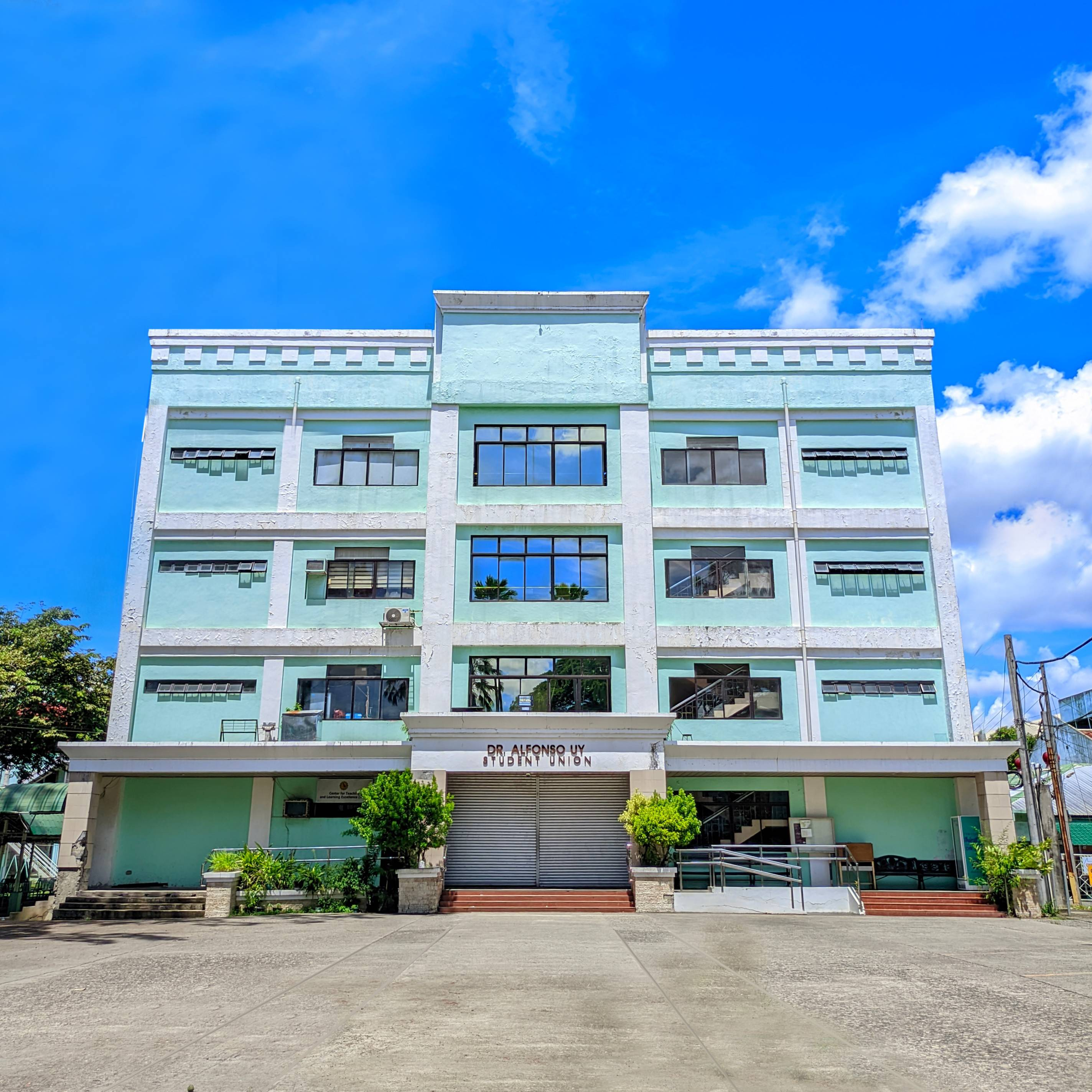
The Dr. Alfonso A. Uy – Student Union Building was donated by Alfonso A. Uy, the first president of the Filipino-Chinese Chamber of Commerce and Industry from Visayas and Mindanao.

CPU–Iloilo Mission Hospital, the university hospital of Central in 2001, celebrated its centennial, commemorating its century of existence and its contribution since its founding in 1901 to the Philippine and American colonial history in the Philippines and in Asia as it pioneered the Nursing education in the Philippines, as the first Protestant founded hospital in the country and the second American hospital in Asia. The centennial building was inaugurated in the hospital area proper and the hospital acquisition of the Philips MX8000 CT Scan machine, the first of its kind in South East Asia

Augmented amounts from the Centennial Development Fund and the help of various individuals, was used to build and expand the various structures on the main campus, such as the Dr. Alfonso A. Uy – Student Union Building, a four-storey commercial building built through the fund and by Dr. Alfonso A. Uy (an alumnus of the university) on the campus, to help augment its operational expenses, and to further raise its financial base; CPU Lifestyle Learning Center (prior to the students and the people who wanted to manage their fitness lifestyle); and the CPU Alumni Promenade and Concert Park, which is structurally attached to the also newly built CPU Alumni Center, CPU Alumni Affairs Office, Educational Media Center (where the CPU TV Channel and Radio broadcasts still to this day) and the CPU Dining Hall, and the CPU Excel Center.

The Board of International Ministries of the American Baptist Churches has awarded Central a School of Excellence award.

Also, in the school year 2000–2001, the Central Philippine University College of Engineering introduced the Bachelor of Science in Software Engineering. This has earned the college another place in Engineering History in the Philippines. It is the first engineering school in the country to offer the course. On August 15, 2001, also, Dr. Teodoro C. Robles (BSEE 1964) (then-university president) and a former Milwaukee School of Engineering professor conducted a national seminar on a digital logic software known as the Altera Max + Plus II which was attended by different engineering schools in the Philippines and hosted by the Electrical Engineering and Electronics and Communications Engineering department of Central Philippine University College of Engineering.

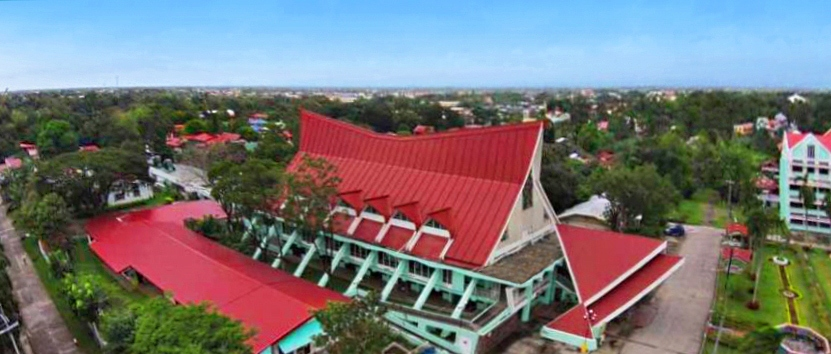
Aerial view of the CPU Church in which a canopy on the front of the church was added later during the 2005 centennial celebration of Central.

The College of Engineering hosted the first-ever National Congress on Civil Engineering. Then, a seminar workshop was held featuring Dr. Stephen Agunlana from Asian Institute of Technology as guest professor. This was followed by the two more Civil Engineering Seminars, this time featuring alumni, namely, Asian Institute of Technology based Engr. Henry Abiera (College Alumnus) on Geotechnical engineering, and Engr. Vicente Golveo (BSCE 1957) from the United States of America on Structural Engineering. Seminars on Instrumentation and Micro Controllers were undertaken with Dr. Teodoro Robles (College of Alumnus and present university president), also from the United States of America, as resource person.

One of the other prominent infrastructural developments during Dr. Juanito Acanto's term as a president, is the establishment of the university's own Television Channel, the CPU TV Channel. The television channel, launched in 2001 under its former names, EXCEL TV, then was changed to CPU Alumni Channel in 2005, and to CPU TV Channel, is the first university–based cable TV channel in Asia, is one big leap in upholding the university's standard in quality education through the use of mass media. There were various new real properties also that is owned by the university when he was in his term as the president. The 24 hectares San Rafael Agricultural Land and the 14-hectare (35-acre) Guimaras Agricultural Land

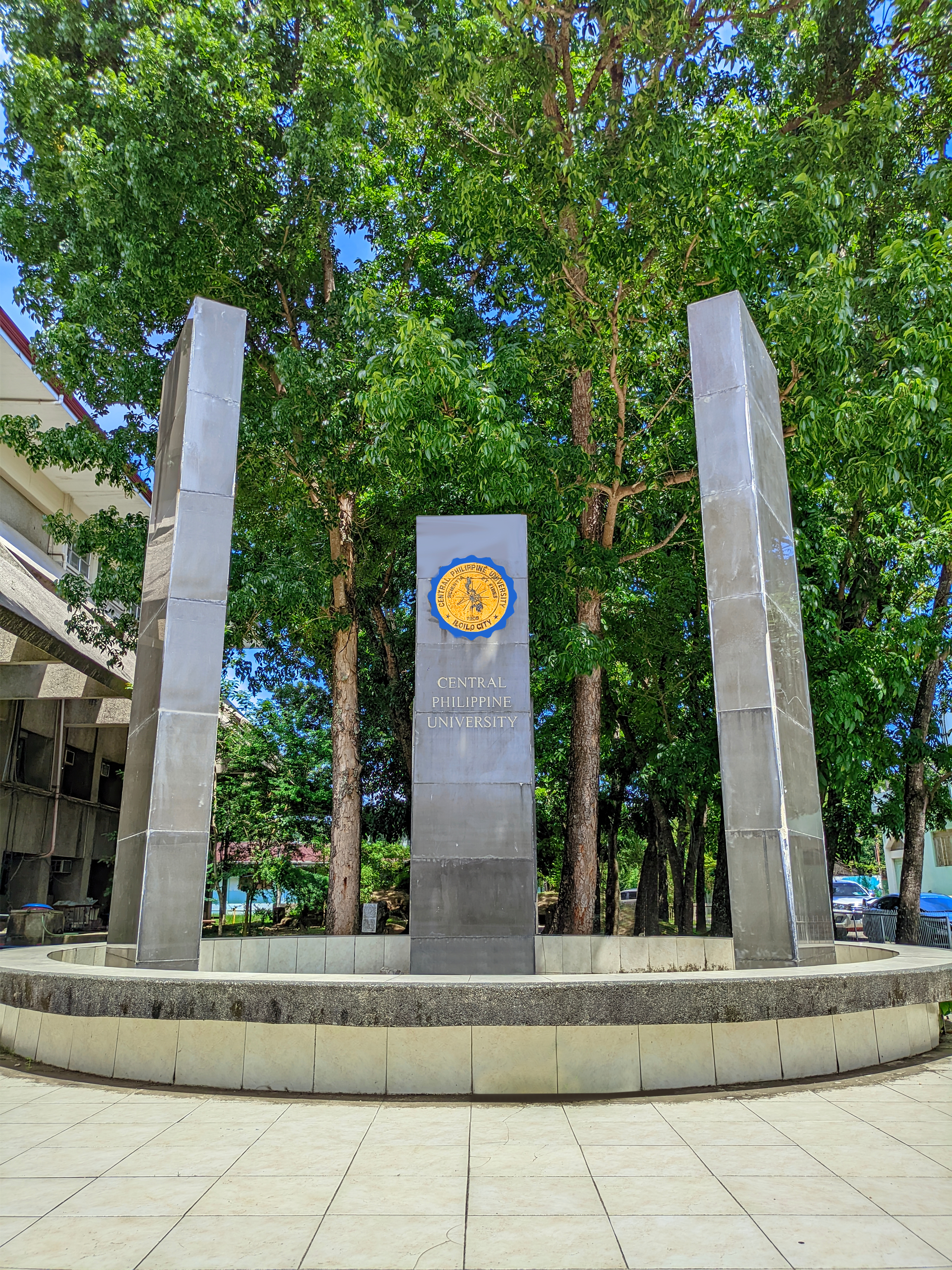
The Wall of Remembrance built before Central's centennial in 2005.

Central gained much attention and was lauded by various business and technology sectors in the field of Engineering, through its pioneer Packaging Engineering program and department in the College of Engineering, being the first such in the country and in Asia, organized and hosted the first National Conference in Transport Packaging in 2007 it was then followed also by the first Philippine International Packaging Conference, the Global Pack 2012. Thomas Schneider, President and CEO of the 51-member nation World Packaging Organization, is one of the delegates of the Global Pack 2012 event along with various people from other countries, government agencies and business sector. Along with the Global Pack 2012 conference, a packaging engineering testing center and laboratory and value-added facility of a UN-compliant and comprehensive was donated by US Packaging Hall of Famer and Department of Science and Technology (DOST-Philippines) Balik Scientist Dr. Lejo Brana, is also the first of its kind in the Southeast Asian region, the CPU Philippine Center for Packaging Engineering and Technology (CPU-PC PET). The center is backed by the Department of Science and Technology, the industry's Packaging Institute of the Philippines and a private sector's packaging advocate, Systemat-PackEDGE.

=== Recent history ===
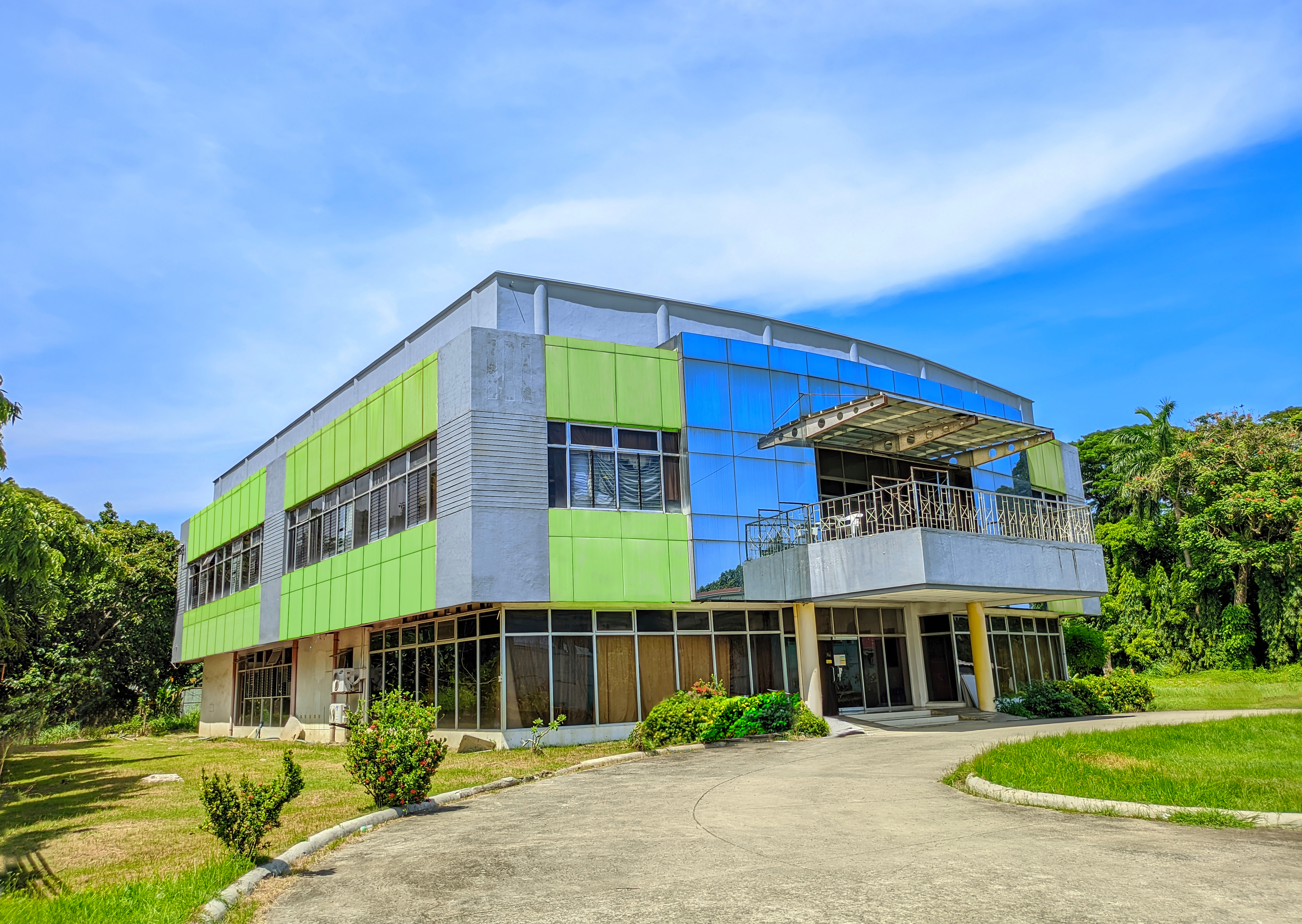
The CPU Lifestyle Learning Center built during the term of CPU President Juanito M. Acanto.

The university currently expanded its numbers of programs in business, agriculture, and medical and health sciences and the recent re-establishment of the pharmacy department. The International Organization for Standardization (ISO), prior to the university as an ISO Certified Institution, recently conducted an external audit and surveillance for the university's renewal of ISO certification, based on the new standard. The university last upgraded its certification last 2010. The said University's certification, covers educational and support which is up to year 2013. Recently, through international collaborations with other institutions has made CPU to offer undergraduate programs in Business Administration and Accountancy, graduate programs in Business Administration and Public Administration, and doctorate degree in Management program at Thai Nguyen University (TNU) and Thai Nguyen University of Economics and Business Administration (TUEBA) both in Vietnam.

The university acquired also a Level IV accreditation status (the highest level of accreditation that could be given to an individual academic program in the Philippines) from Association of Christian Schools, Colleges and Universities (ACSCU) in the programs of Business Administration, Accountancy and Education, among others, has made it the top university in the Western Visayan region with programs that has a said accreditation status and level. It ranks first in the Philippines in terms of tertiary academic programs with Level III level status. The university also ranks first among other universities based on Centers of Development and Excellence list in Western Visayas, where six of its programs designated by the Commission on Higher Education as Centers of Development and Center of Excellence, while the Department of Science and Technology designated its Civil Engineering program as Center for Civil Engineering Education. Central is one of the two leaders in the Visayas and Mindanao based on endowment funding, with 182 Endowment programs and a total of 433 Endowment funds in 2007 that is still on-going and expanding still to this day.

In 2019, it had 7,673 students.

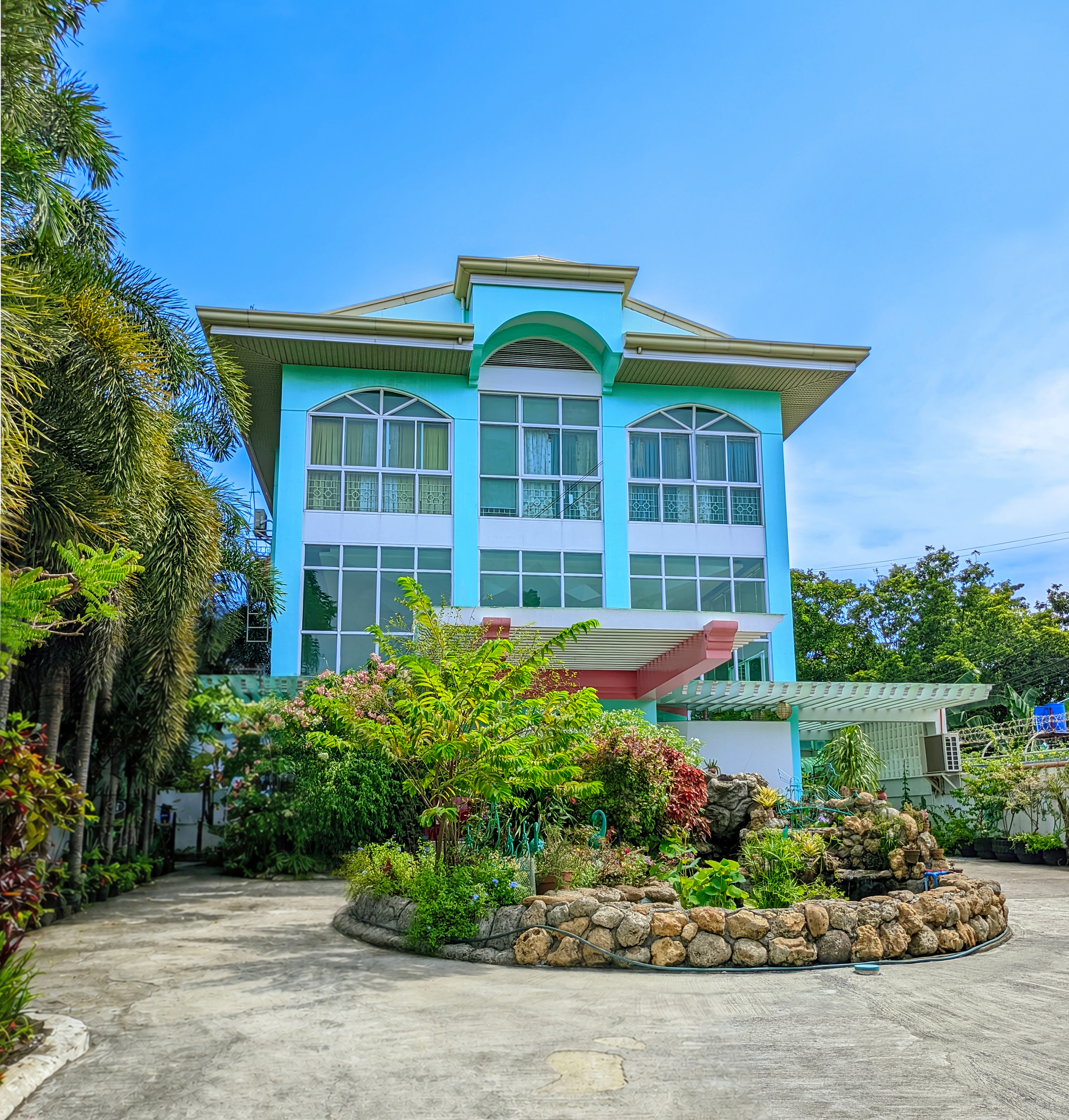
The three-storey Missionary Hall, donated by former CPU president, Teodoro Robles, was named in honor of the American Baptist Missionaries who became part of the university's history. It is now a residential commons.

In November 2020, the university's long continued run in academic excellence has resulted for it to be ranked by Quacquarelli Symonds in its list of Top Universities in Asia and the World for 2021, the first higher education institution to do so in the Western Visayas region. CPU placed in the 601+ bracket ranking (8th place in bracket ranking and 13th place in numbering in the Philippines) among other Asian universities in the list. Quacquarelli Symonds or QS is one of the big three world university ranking agencies along with Times Higher Education (THE) and Academic Ranking of World Universities (ARWU).

In 2023, it debuted in Times Higher Education Impact Rankings. It was followed by its inclusion in the AppliedHE Top Private Universities in Southeast Asia in 2024 to 2025, and ALL ASIA in 2026 (placing in 171-190 spot). In 2025, CPU debuted in the World University Rankings for Innovation list.

In December 2023, Central has also been admitted as a member institution of Southeast Asian Ministers of Education Organization Schools Network (SEAMEO Schools Network) to further enhance its research and academic capabilities in the international stage.

On February 24, 2023, Asian Christian Outreach, Inc. (ASCO) and Fortress College, Inc. in Kabankalan City, Negros Occidental, donated their properties through a memorandum of agreement with Central Philippine University, thus creating the first presence of the university outside Iloilo.

On March 26, 2026, the four-storey CPU Law and Medicine Building officially broke ground. The state-of-the-art facility, designed with architectural influences from heritage structures on campus such as Franklin Hall and Weston Hall, aims to address the increasing student population and provide dedicated facilities for the CPU College of Law and the CPU College of Medicine. The building will consist of two sections, each housing one college. It will feature moot courts, specialized laboratories, a theater, a mechanical elevator, and air-conditioned classrooms. The project forms part of the university's continuing commitment to the expansion and enhancement of its physical plant.

On June 22, 2026, the university hedl a dedication ceremony to mark the completion of an initiative to install air conditioning in all academic classrooms across its constituent schools and colleges. University officials stated that the project aligns with ongoing efforts to modernize campus facilities and improve the learning environment.

== Campus ==
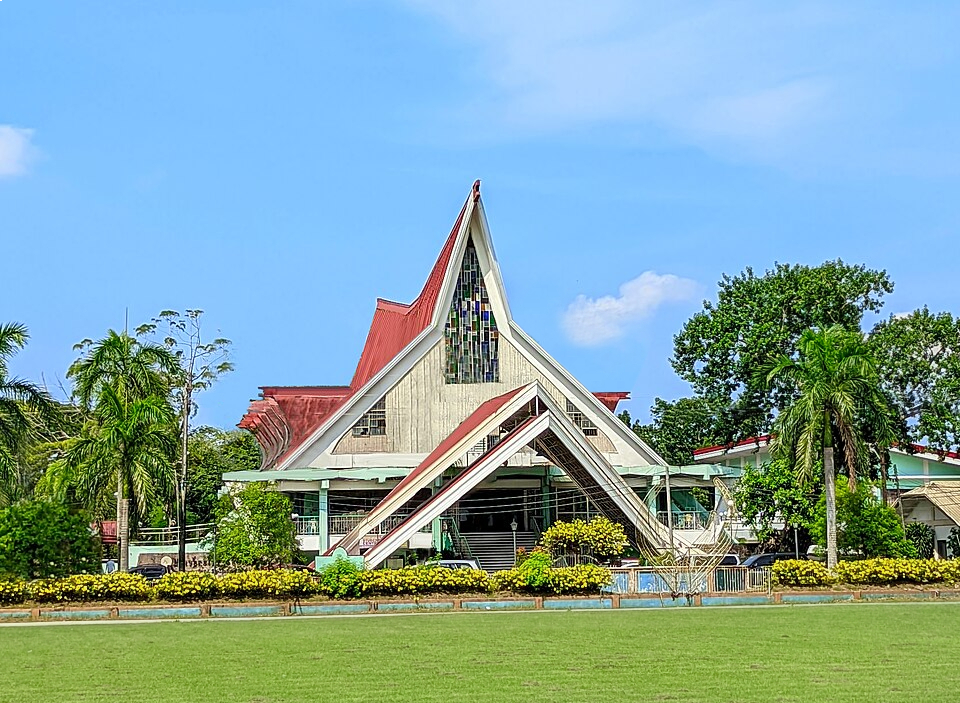
The Central Philippine University Church (University Church), built in the 1970s, is the central and dominant structure in the main campus by architectural order. Its design is resonant of a Malayan style of house built on palm leaves and bamboo.

Central has an overall total combined land area of 195.13 hectares (482.17 acres), which is composed of the main campus (24 hectares), CPU Hopevale Agricultural Extension Land (95.8 hectares), CPU Zarraga Farm and Research Campus (19.3 hectares), CPU Leon Experimental Farm and Research Campus (7 hectares), CPU Centennial Village (2.9 hectares), the CPU–Iloilo Mission Hospital (3 hectares), CPU-FA (Faculty Association) Heritage Ville Subdivision (4.7) San Rafael Land (24 hectares), and Guimaras Land (14 hectares), and CPU Fortress College in Kabankalan City, Negros Occidental (0.43 hectares).

The CPU's main campus sits on 24 hectares (59.30 acres) of land in Jaro, the largest district of Iloilo City, a city known for Spanish influence. It is set between the Tigum River and Dungon Creek and away from the city center.

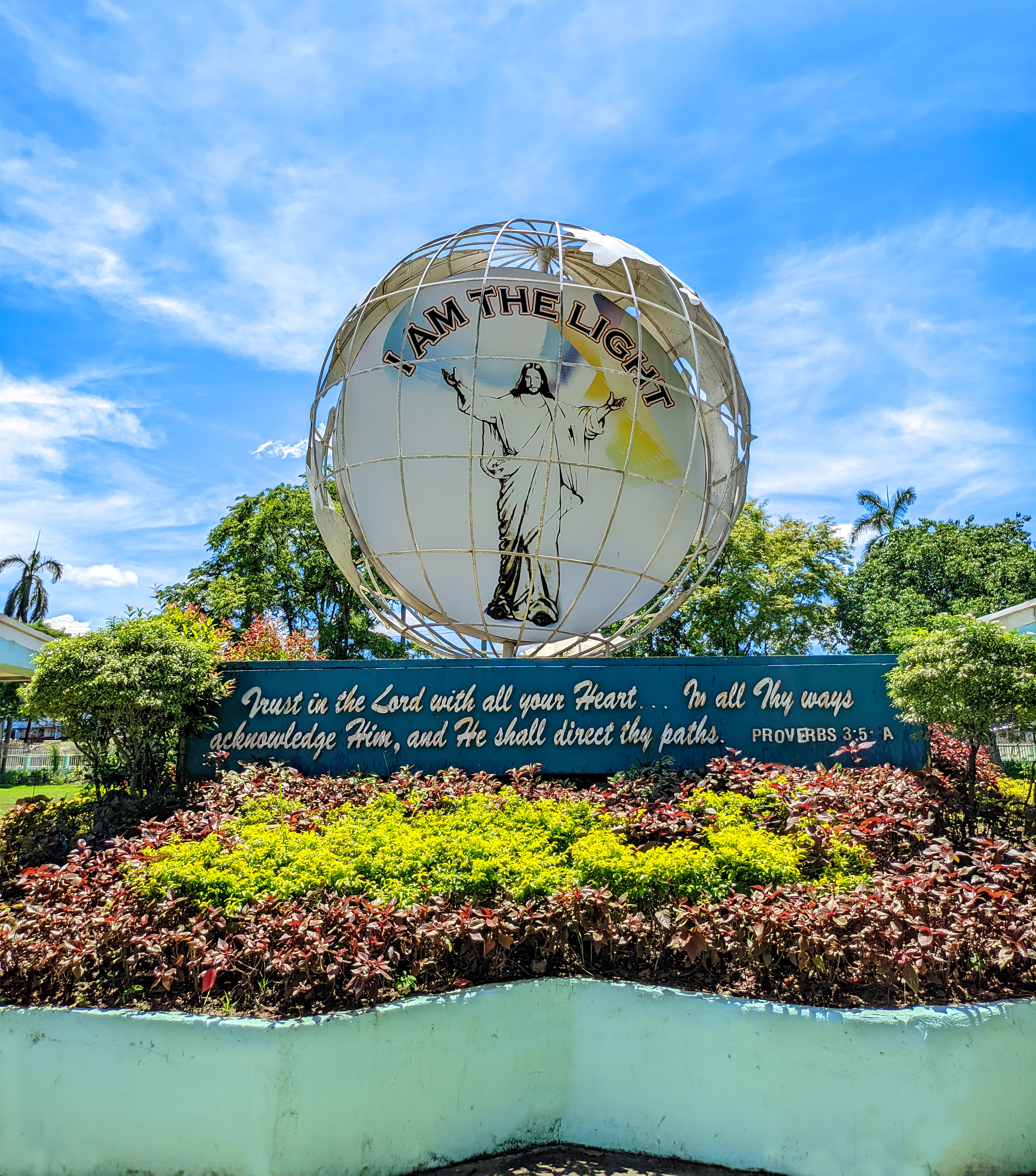
The Smile Hill denotes the university's foundation as a Christian institution established by Protestant Baptist American missionaries.

The main campus's land was bought by the American Baptist Foreign Mission Society through a grant of the American industrialist and philanthropist, John D. Rockefeller. More than thirty structures were built on what was originally swamp land. It is surrounded by different barrios and is dotted by tree species such as palm and acacia trees.

Some of the structures on the main campus which were built during the early American colonial period, possess designs influenced by colonizers from the United States. The main campus which follows a university campus plan modeled after the universities in the United States and in Europe, has a wide and big green open spaces or yards. A sample of which is the 'Big Field, which is bounded on both sides with heritage and modern-built edifices, a character unique to CPU that not only became a factor for the university being a haven conducive to learning, but also a place of interest for visiting tourists

Nine of the buildings on the main campus that were built in the 1900s especially during the American colonial period, were listed in the Philippine Registry of Heritage (PRH), which is also known as the “Talapamana ng Pilipinas”, under the National Commission for Culture and the Arts (NCCA). These buildings are the following: Franklin Hall (Bulwagang Franklin), Valentine Hall (Bulwagang Valentine), Mary Thomas Hall (Bulwagang Mary Thomas), Eugenio Lopez Memorial Hall (Bulwagang Eugenio Lopez), Roblee Science Hall (Bulwagang Pang-agham ng Roblee), University Church (Simbahan ng Pamantasan), Weston Hall (Bulwagang Weston), Stuart Hall (Bulwagang Stuart), and Johnson Hall (Bulwagang Johnson).

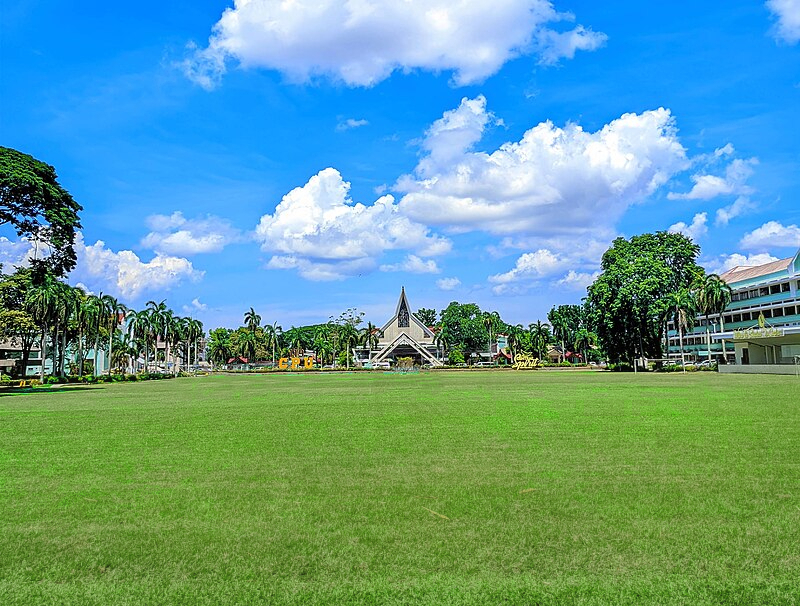
Big Field with the CPU Church at the background. CPU's sprawling 24-hectare main campus, a property bought through a benevolent grant by the American business magnate, John D. Rockefeller, has more than a dozen collection of century-old structures built during the colonial American era and is dotted with acacia and palm trees.

The campus is flanked by various gates. The second gate is the university's main entrance. It bears the university's motto, Scientia et Fides, which in English means "Science and Faith" (lit. Knowledge and Faith). Central has been designated as a Marked Historical Landmark or Site by the Philippine government cultural agency of National Historical Commission of the Philippines, and a Registered Cultural Property of the Philippines under the National Commission for Culture and the Arts. Central has been declared by the local government unit of Iloilo City as Tourist site and has been recommended in the Western Visayas region as a place of interest, attraction, and landmark to visit by travel site Trip Advisor. Central has been also hailed as the second of all the 18 beautiful college campuses in the Philippines by American internet media company BuzzFeed.

By architectural order on the main campus, the Central Philippine University University Church (University Church) stands as the tallest building, and is meant by the campus's planners as a "central and dominant feature" of the university. The CPU Church which is notable for its Malay architectural design, stained glass and dormer windows, façade canopy, and flying buttresses, is a famous landmark in Iloilo City. Henry Luce III Library is one of the largest libraries in the Philippines, with more than a quarter of a million volume holdings. Inside the Henry Luce III Library is the Meyer Asian Collection holdings of artifacts and other museum and art exhibitions.

Other buildings on the main campus include the Rose Memorial Auditorium or Rose. The Rose Memorial was built to replace the old Rose Memorial Hall that was burnt down by a fire in 1991. The Rose Memorial Auditorium is the largest theater in Western Visayas and has been a famous venue for international and local concerts, musicales, band concerts, and conventions in Iloilo. Rose became the first annual venue during the early years of the prestigious national Bombo Music Festival. The Cultural Center of the Philippines has designated the Rose Memorial Auditorium for a three-year memorandum of understanding as one of the first batch of nine Cultural Center of the Philippines Regional Art Centers or Kaisa sa Sining Regional Art Centers in 2014, the theater/auditorium to research such recognition in the Western Visayas region

The Rose Memorial Auditorium, the largest auditorium in Western Visayas.

Notable residential halls on the main campus include the Johnson Hall which houses the only residential-academic college in the university, the College of Theology; the Weston Hall, a dormitory for women; Franklin Hall, a residential hall for men; the Missionary Hall, a co-ed apartment type residence; and the Roselund Hall (Hostel). There are several residential houses and halls in the American Village which cater to foreign students who are studying at the university.

The Roblee Science Hall serves as a laboratory building for the science and laboratory experiment classes of the colleges and departments of Medical Laboratory Sciences, Pharmacy, and Chemistry (also, General subjects of other colleges held classes in Roblee Science Hall). Old Valentine Hall is a monument to Central's founder, William Valentine, a Baptist missionary. It now houses the Colleges of Education and Arts and Sciences of the university.

The main campus is a locally declared tourism site, and the university maintains a team of landscapers and gardeners. It is enhanced by parks, gazebos, gardens and open spaces, including the Big Field, Half Moon, Alumni Garden, Santos Park, Nuñez Centennial Garden, Caipang Tree Park, Rex A. Drilon Millenium Park, the Glen at the Catedral, the Prayer Garden, the CPU-CAS Butterfly Garden, and the University Botanical Garden.

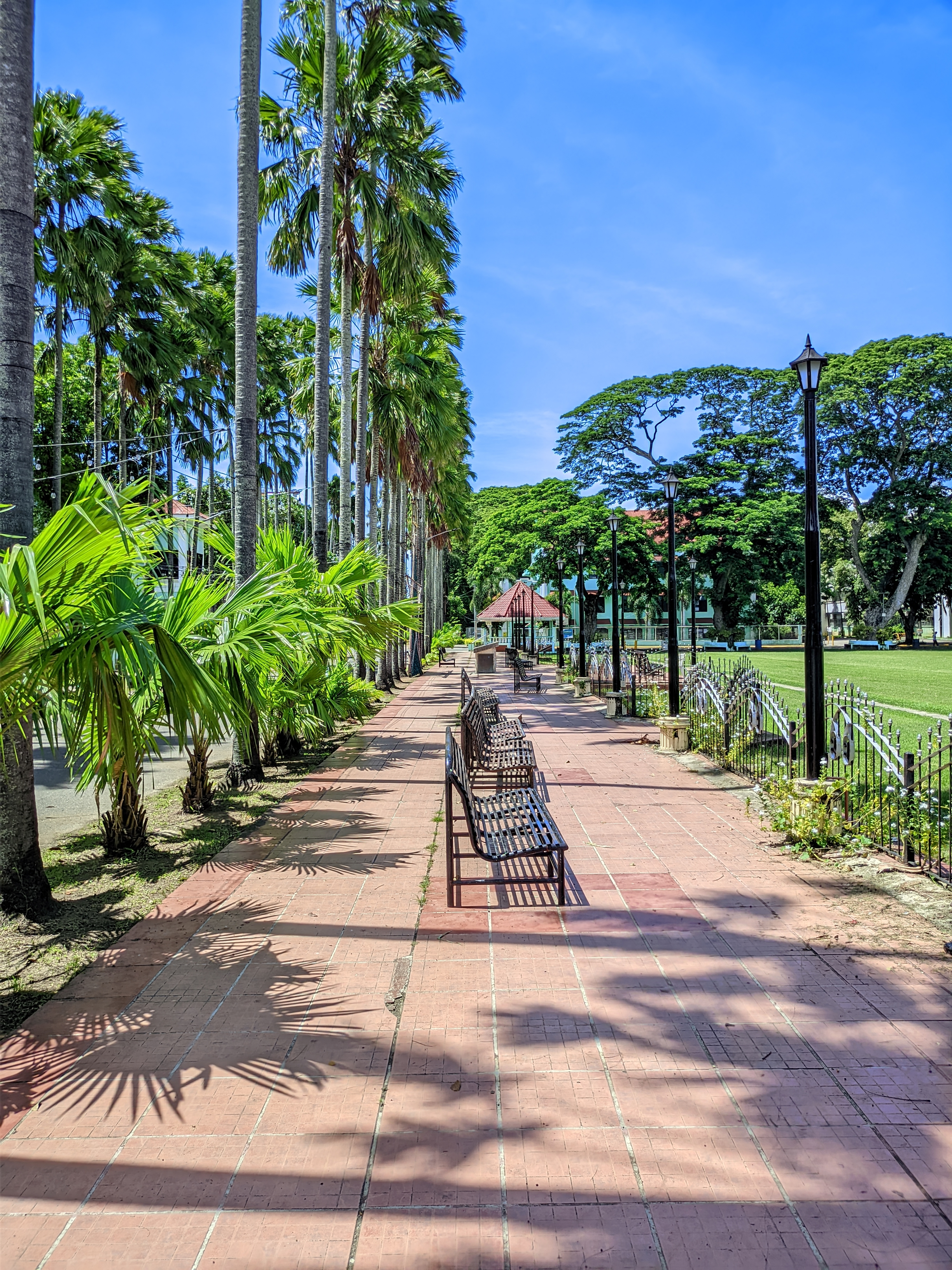
The Centennial Walkway.

Annually, the university showcases the Festival of Lights and Music at Central, a joint project of the university and the CPU Alumni Association. The event features lighted figurines, trees and buildings, nativity scenes, and colorful lanterns attracting thousands of local and foreign tourists during the Christmas season. The Opening of Lights (Festival of Lights and Music at Central) remains one of the notable features of the CPU campus. It opens in the first week of December and is highlighted with a fireworks display at the opening ceremony. Lighted trees, buildings and figurines, Pampanga, Capiz shells, and native lanterns placed along the major campus roads and nativity scenes add to its festive atmosphere.

The Central Philippine University–Iloilo Mission Hospital (CPU–Iloilo Mission Hospital), located more than a kilometer away south of the main campus in the district of Jaro, Iloilo City, sits on 3 hectares of land. A tertiary, teaching and academic hospital, it serves as the university hospital of Central for its medical care and laboratory and clinical training center for the university's medical and allied health sciences students.

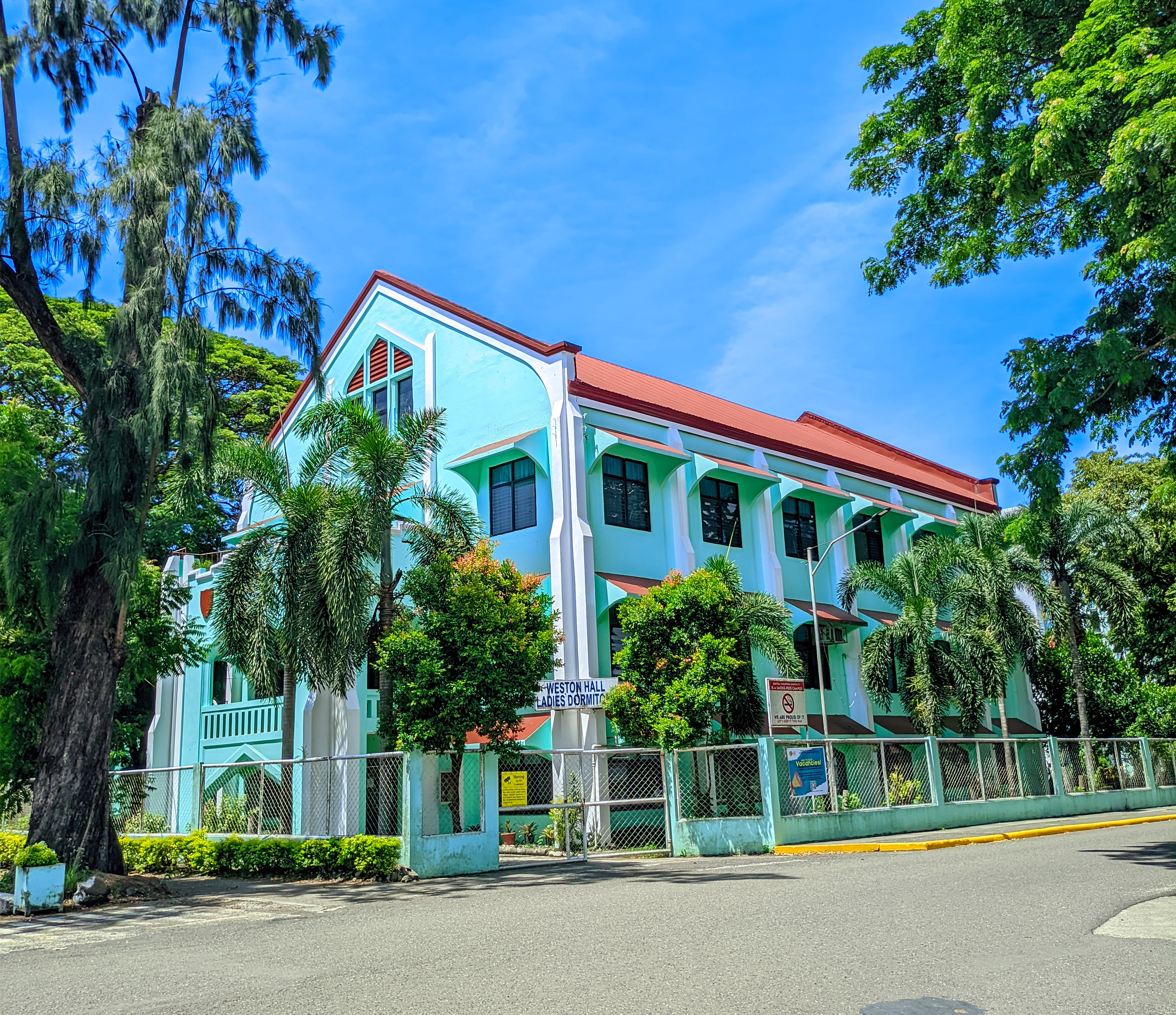
Weston Hall is one of the American-named edifices built during the early years of the university and one of the few American-built structures in Iloilo.

Further north, in Katipunan, Tapaz, in the province of Capiz, is the 95.8-hectare (237-acre) Hopevale land of the university being utilized and to be developed into instruction, research, and extension of the College of Agriculture, Resources and Environmental Sciences (CARES). The 19.3-hectare (48-acre) CPU Zarraga Farm (in the municipality of Zarraga, Iloilo) which is also under the said agricultural college and is separate from the university's main campus, hosts being an agricultural farm for research and extension. The CPU Crop Research Laboratory and other agricultural research facilities and equipment of the agricultural college are located in the CPU Zarraga Farm.

The CPU Experimental Farm in Leon, Iloilo, which is under the college also is the site of the CPU Center for Research, Technology Development and Commercial Production of Philippine Native Chicken (CPU CRTDCPPNC), the largest research center for Philippine Native Chicken in the Philippines is located. The university villages for faculties and administration members of Central, the 2.9-hectare (7.2-acre) CPU Centennial Village (Aganan, Pavia, Iloilo) and 4.7-hectare CPU-Faculty Association (FA) Heritage Ville Subdivision (Anilao, Pavia), are located also separately from the main campus which is both located in the municipality of Pavia, Iloilo, north of the main campus. CPU has also properties in San Rafael, Iloilo (24 hectares), and in Guimaras (14 hectares) serving as agricultural lands for the future expansion of the university.

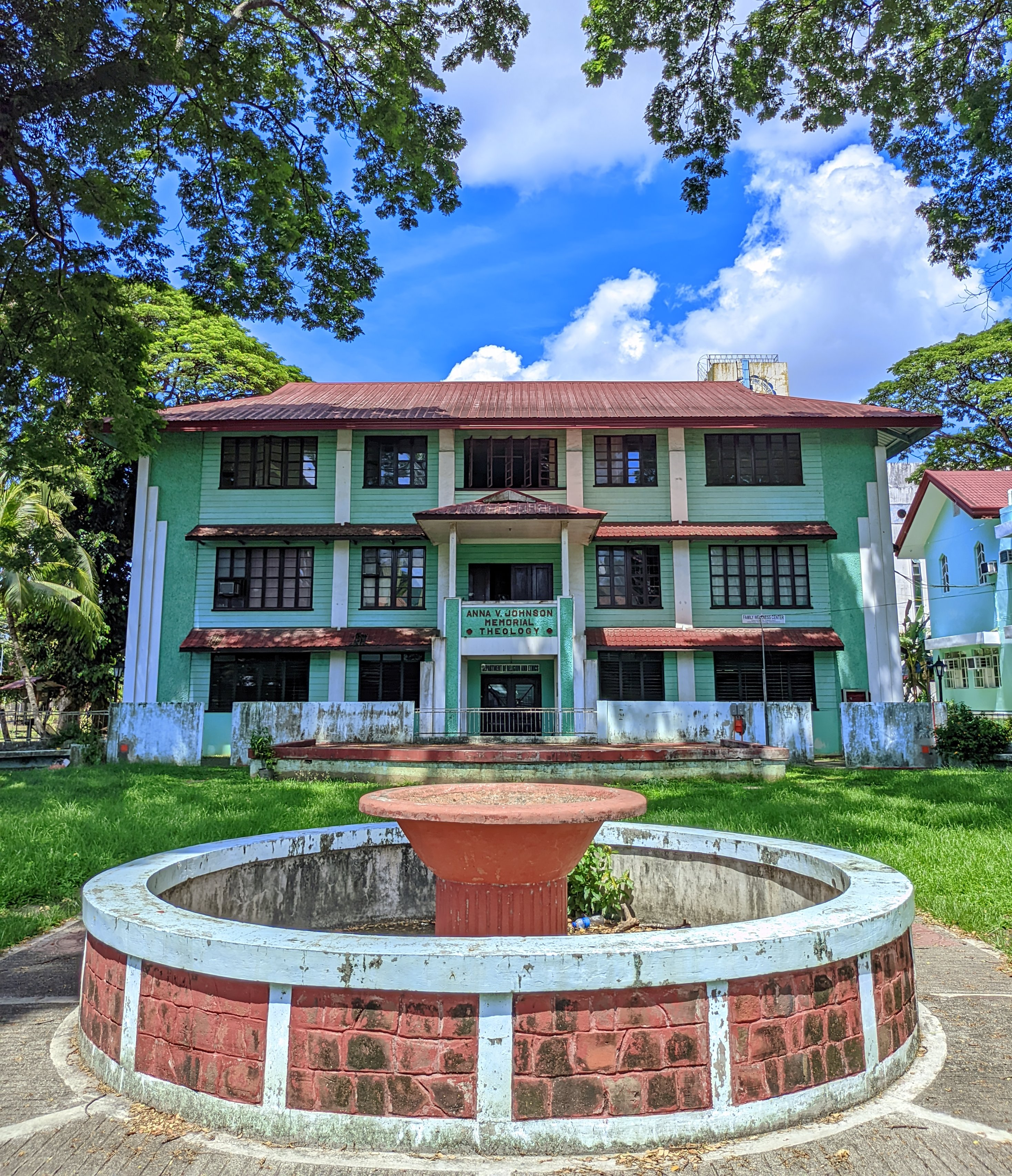
The Johnson Hall was built in honor of Anna V. Johnson, the founder of Baptist Missionary Training School for women in 1904.

In the 1930s, the Lopez family of Iloilo through Don Ramon Lopez, donated a piece of 30,000 square meters (3 hectares) of land west of Dungon Creek in Mandurriao for the establishment of the CPU College of Medicine. It was supposed to be named Ramon Lopez Campus but the establishment of the medical school did not materialize until 2003.

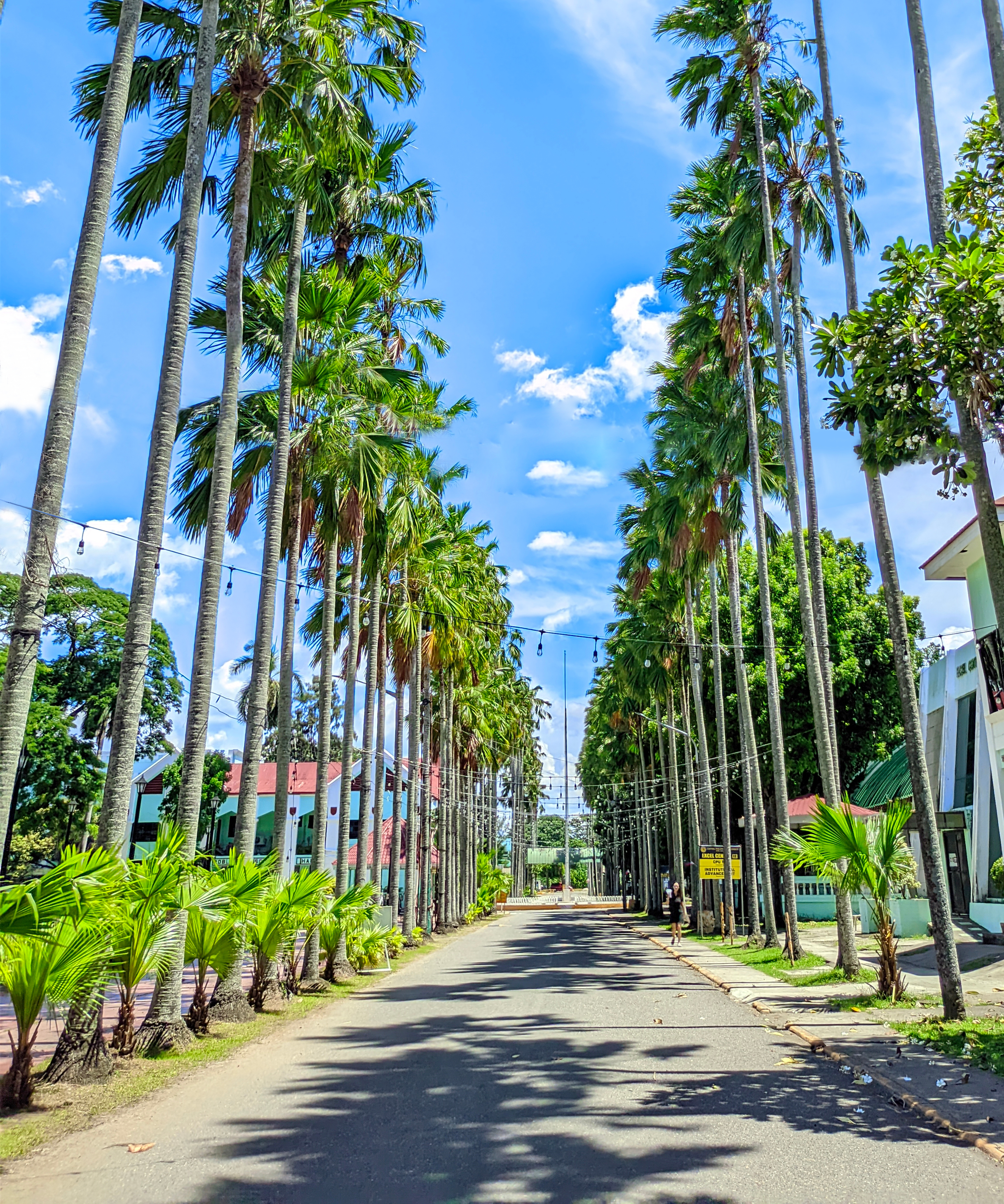
The Anahaw Road.

CPU's physical plant of campuses and properties are under the jurisdiction and management of the university. The three-hectare CPU-Iloilo Mission Hospital on the other hand which is separate from the main campus, has its own Board of Trustees and Corporation independent from Central Philippine University.

The main campus of Central Philippine University functions as both an academic institution and a site of historical and architectural interest in Iloilo City, featuring a combination of early American colonial-era buildings and modern academic and research facilities set within landscaped grounds. The campus is mixed of old and new structures which include the Henry Luce III Library, the Rose Memorial Auditorium, and the University Church, and is characterized by open green spaces and a variety of mature tree species. In addition to its educational role, the campus is occasionally noted for its cultural significance and serves as a venue for academic, religious, and community-related events.

=== Sustainability ===
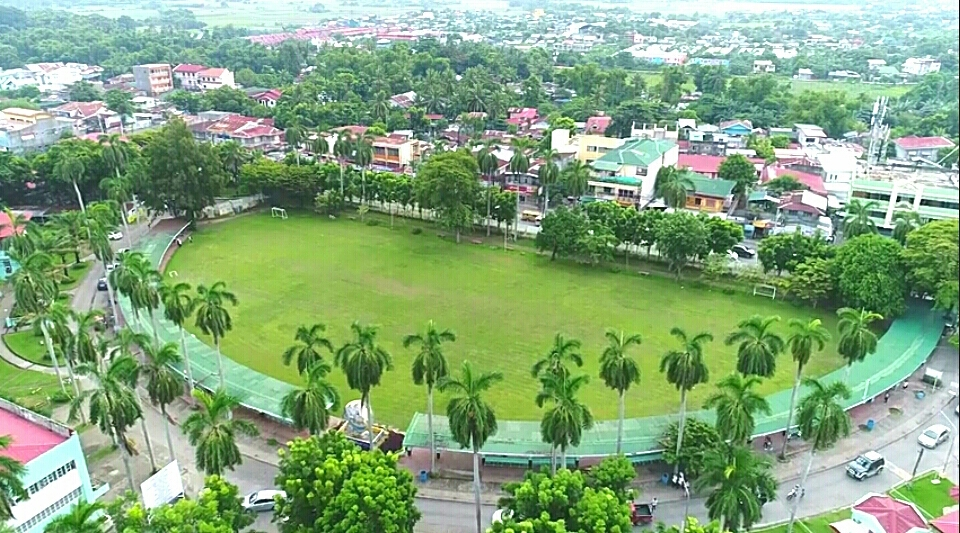
Halfmoon drive and field are one of the few open and big green spaces in the university. Several programs have been initiated and adopted by the university for sustainability on its main, external, and research campuses

CPU's main campus buildings are predominantly painted with eco-friendly lighter shade of green color for environmental consciousness and green campus initiative plans for sustainability. The university has laid in place an Air Quality Monitoring System unit, which monitors air quality and is the only unit that serves the City of Iloilo. The unit is operated jointly by the university with the Department of Environment and Natural Resources.

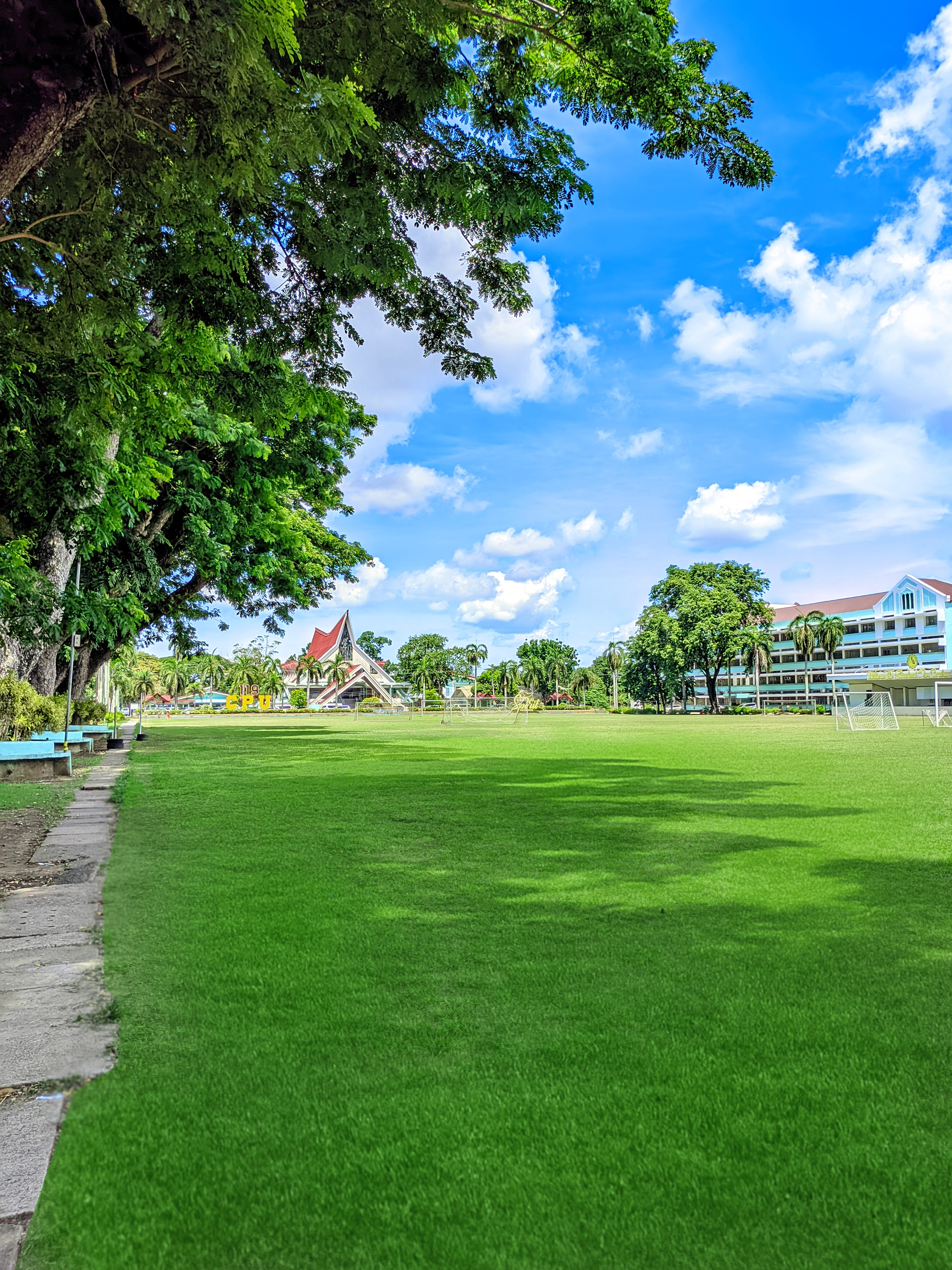
The view of the Big Field with the CPU Church and the Engineering Building in the background.

In 2011, the university's continued efforts in sustainability yielded when it won the Regional Tertiary Level of the National Search for Sustainable and Eco-friendly Schools of the Department of Environment and Natural Resources – Environmental Management Bureau. The said award paved the way for the university's nomination at the national level of the said prize. The award is given to schools, colleges, and universities that have shown excellence through the campus sustainability programs it has.

The whole stretch of CPU's main campus is dotted with centuries-old acacia, anahaw, and royal palm trees. Two large lush and green open spaces, the Big Field and Halfmoon are the university's green yards, equivalent to what some university campuses in Western countries have. The university campus beautification program oversees the maintenance of the university's gardens and park.

The other sustainability programs of the university on the campus include a wastewater treatment facility for the wastewater that is emitted then will be processed to a safer level before it will be dumped back into the environment by the main campus buildings. Back in 2005, the university also launched the CPU New Millennium Tree (CPU NMT) for Sustainable Development. The said program is designed to heighten environmental consciousness in the university, where it seeks to plant thousands of mahogany trees.

== Administration ==
Principals and Presidents of Central Philippine University
William Orison Valentine, 1905–1906, 1907–1914
Charles L. Maxfield, 1906–1907
Francis H. Rose, 1914–1916; 1938–1941
Henry W. Munger, 1916–1917
Mary J. Thomas, 1917–1918
Alton E. Bigelow, 1918–1922
Harland F. Stuart 1922–1938
R. Fred H. Chambers, 1941–1942
Joseph Morris R. Forbes, 1947–1950
Peter Hugh J. Lerrigo, 1950–1952
Almus O. Larsen, 1952–1956; 1957–1961
Linnea A. Nelson 1956–1957; 1965–1966
Joseph T. Howard, 1961–1965
Rex D. Drilon 1966–1971
Agustin A. Pulido 1971–1996
Juanito M. Acanto 1996–2008
Teodoro C. Robles 2008–2023
Ernest Howard B. Dagohoy 2023–present
References	^{[b]}

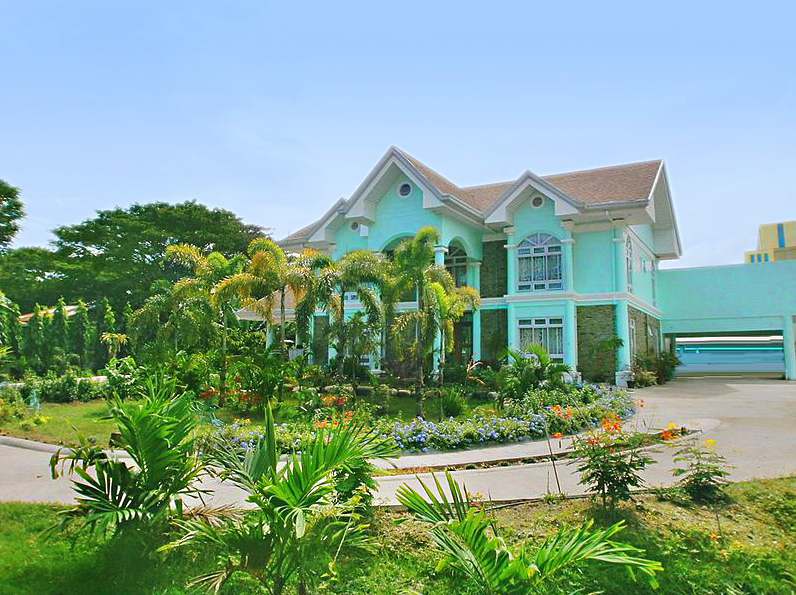
The Presidential House, the official residence of the university president.

The Central Philippine University is governed by a corporation under a non-stock and non-profit entity as Central Philippine University, Corporation. The university is administered by a Board of Trustees with members representing the Convention of Philippine Baptist Churches.

CPU–Iloilo Mission Hospital, the university's hospital, is also represented automatically in the university's corporation by its hospital director. Historically Protestant and maintaining an affiliation with the Convention of Philippine Baptist Churches and fraternal ties with the American Baptist Churches USA, Central is independent in governance and academically non-sectarian, imposing no religious requirement on the admission of students.

The CPU Board of Trustees' structure and the corporation is headed by a chairman and vice-chairman alongside the university president, the vice-president for administration and finance, the vice-president for student affairs, the vice-president for academic affairs, and the vice-president for research, development, and extension. The General Secretary of the Convention of Philippine Baptist Churches sits as an ex-officio member. The CPU Alumni Association, the faculty, and staff are likewise represented on the board. The president of the university's student government, the CPU Republic, sits as a representative of the students.

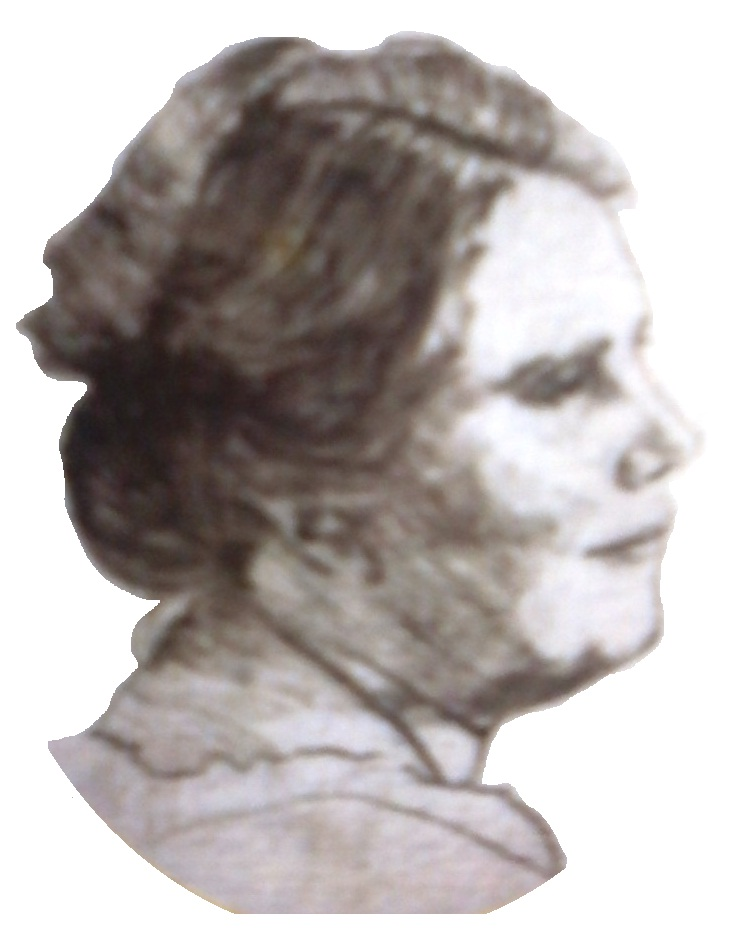
Mary J. Thomas, the first woman Principal of Jaro Industrial School, Central Philippine University's forerunner.

CPU–Iloilo Mission Hospital is a separate entity from the university. Its board of trustees is independent of CPU's corporation but largely composed of personnel from the university. Former CPU president, Juanito Maca Acanto, seats as the chairman of CPU–Iloilo Mission Hospital Corporation and Board of Trustees.

The former and 17th president (and also the 4th Filipino president) of the university is Teodoro C. Robles. An alumnus of the university, he studied engineering and graduated in 1964. Dr. Teodoro C. Robles also earned his M.S. and Doctor of Philosophy (Ph.D.) degrees in Electrical Engineering at Montana State University.

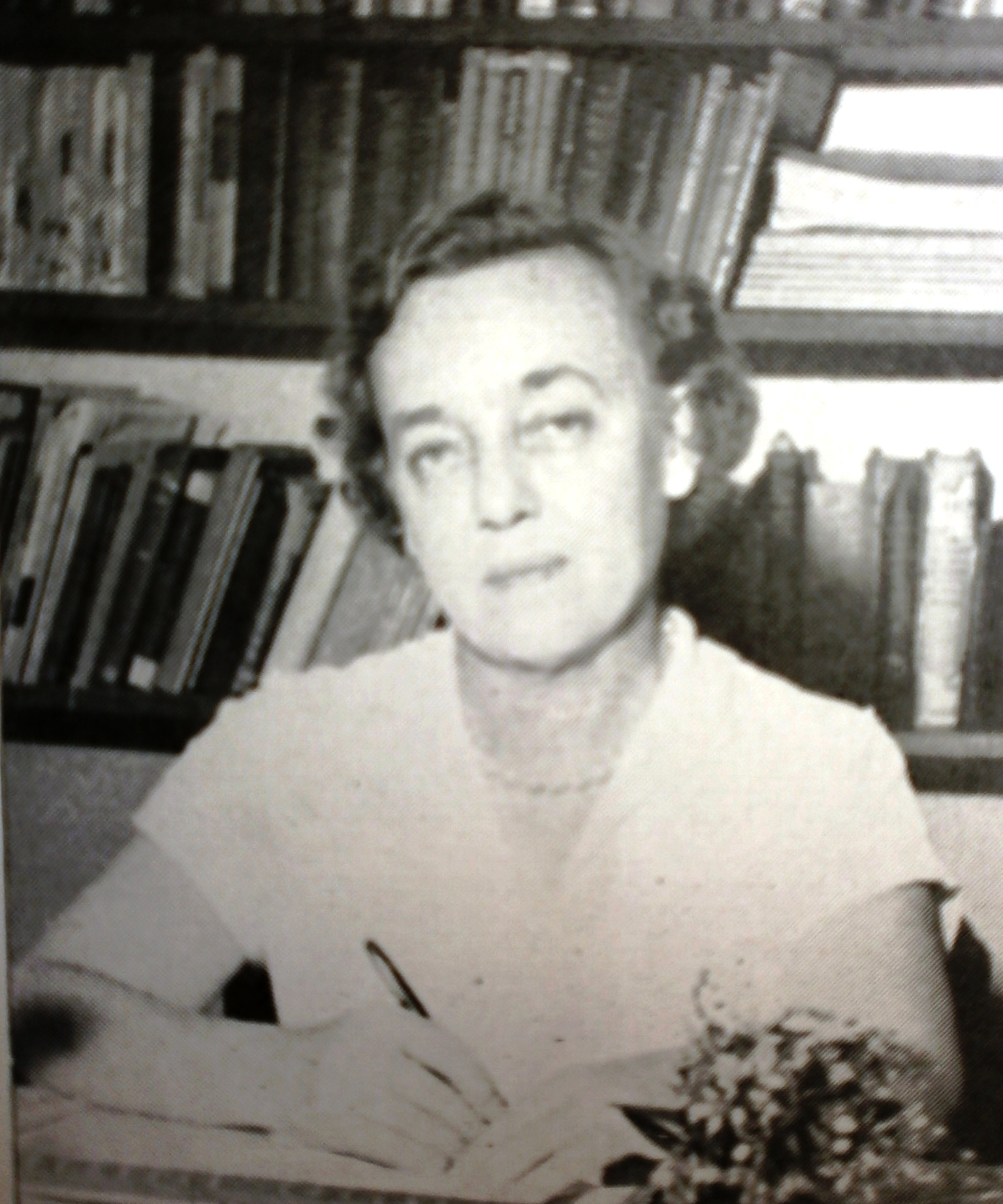
Linnea A. Nelson, the first woman President of Central Philippine University.

The board of trustees unanimously elected him on September 5, 2008, to be the new president and was confirmed by the CPU Corporation in a special meeting on September 18, 2008.

Ernest Howard B. Dagohoy currently serves as the incumbent and 18th president of Central Philippine University (CPU) and is also recognized as the 5th Filipino president of the university. An alumnus of CPU, he holds a bachelor's degree in Theology. During his college years, Dagohoy held leadership positions, including Governor of the CPU College of Theology and later as a Senator of the CPU Republic. He furthered his education, earning a Doctor of Ministry from The Billy Graham School of Missions, Evangelism, and Church Growth, as well as a Master of Divinity (M.Div.) from the Asian Theological Seminary. Notably, he graduated with honors from the CPU Development High School Class of 1978 and held prominent roles, such as Corps Commander of the Citizens Army Training Corps of Cadets.

On October 2, 2023, the board of trustees and Corporation of Central Philippine University (CPU) announced the election and confirmation of Rev. Dr. Ernest Howard B. Dagohoy as the new president.

Central Philippine University maintains ties as a sister school with Silliman University in Dumaguete, the first American and Protestant-founded university in the Philippines and in Asia.

== Rankings and reputation ==
University rankings

Global – Overall
- THE World: 1501+ (2025) THE Impact Rankings 2025

Regional – Overall
- QS Asia: 851-900 (2025) 153 (2025) QS South Eastern Asia

National – Overall
- QS National: 14 (2025) 1 (2025) Western Visayas

Central Philippine University (CPU) has consistently been ranked as one of the Asian and global universities by Quacquarelli Symonds (QS) since 2021. It was the first university from the Western Visayas region to be included in these rankings. In 2021, CPU was ranked 601, 651+ in 2022, 701–750 in 2023, and 851–900 in 2025. These rankings placed CPU in the 8th position among Philippine universities in the agency's 2022 and 2023 rankings. It is the third Visayan university to be included in these rankings, following Silliman University (CPU's sister school) and Cebu Technological University. This recognition signifies CPU's status as a world-class institution, known for its exemplary education in research, academics, diverse student and faculty populations, linkages, and designations. QS is one of the top three prestigious world university ranking agencies, along with Times Higher Education (THE) and Academic Ranking of World Universities (ARWU).

In the fifth edition of the Impact Rankings by Times Higher Education, published on June 1, 2023, Central Philippine University was included and ranked in the global position of 1001+ (5th in the Philippines). The Impact Rankings by Times Higher Education is the only global performance table that evaluates universities based on the United Nations' Sustainable Development Goals (SDGs). CPU submitted data for the following SDGs: SDG 1 (no poverty), SDG 2 (zero hunger), SDG 4 (quality education), and SDG 17 (partnerships for the goals). CPU's rankings for each SDG are as follows: SDG 1 – 601–800, SDG 2 – 401–600, SDG 4 – 1000+, SDG 17 – 1000+.

In 2024, Central Philippine University achieved a rank of 1501+ in the Times Higher Education Impact Rankings. The university secured 7 global placements in various categories: 801-1000 for Peace, Justice, and Strong Institutions; 601-800 for Sustainable Cities and Communities; 1501+ for Quality Education; 801-1000 for Good Health and Well-Being; 601-800 for Zero Hunger; 801-1000 for No Poverty; and 1501+ for Partnership for the Goals. In 2025, the university placed 1501+ in the 2025 Times Higher Education Impact Rankings with ranking in 8 categories.

Times Higher Education Impact Rankings (Global Rank)
Category	Ranking
Partnership for Goals	1001+ (2023), 1501+ (2024), & 1501+ (2025)
Quality Education	1001+ (2023), 801-1000 (2024), 1501+ (2025)
Zero Hunger	401–600 (2023), 601-800 (2024), & 601-800 (2025)
No Poverty	601–800 (2023), 801-1000 (2024), & 1001+ (2025)
Peace, Justice and Strong Institutions	801-1000 (2024) & 1001+ (2025)
Sustainable Cities and Communities	601-800 (2024) & 801-1000 (2025)
Good Health and Well-Being	801-1000 (2024) & 801-1000 (2025)
Life on Land	401-600 (2025)

In 2006, Central Philippine University ranked No. 1 in the Western Visayas region and No. 5 in the country in terms of high passing rates in various licensure examinations conducted by the Professional Regulation Commission. However, in 2007, a report by the PRC and CHED covering a five-year period (1994–1998) named CPU as the 8th top-performing school in the country based on PRC exams. CPU holds the distinction of being No. 1 in the Philippines in the number of tertiary academic programs accredited at Level III by the Federation of Accrediting Agencies of the Philippines. In the field of engineering, CPU's College of Engineering ranks 10th out of the top 25 engineering schools in the country. These rankings demonstrate the highest level of standards in instruction, research, and extension activities.

In 2009, the Commission on Higher Education of the Philippines released a report listing the Top 20 nursing schools in the country based on average passing rates in nursing board examinations. Central Philippine University ranked 6th, with an average passing rate of 86.72%.

According to data released by the Commission on Higher Education (Philippines) for engineering courses, CPU ranked 10th out of the top 25 engineering schools based on the Center of Excellence and Center of Development. This data further confirms CPU's commitment to maintaining the highest standards in instruction, research, and extension. Additionally, based on board exam passing rates from the Professional Regulation Commission (Philippines), the university's College of Engineering was listed and ranked 9th in the country.

uniRank has ranked Central Philippine University as the top university in Western Visayas and 24th out of the 232 top universities in the Philippines for 2021. uniRank serves as the official web portal of international colleges and universities. It functions as an international higher education search engine and directory, reviewing over 11,000 colleges and universities across 200 countries worldwide. Tertiary education institutions must be duly recognized, licensed, and accredited by national ministries of education or higher education accrediting organizations in order to qualify and be listed on uniRank.org. Additionally, the organization diligently maintains and updates the profiles of the schools included in its list to ensure the accuracy and quality of the information in its directory. It's important to note that uniRank is a non-academic ranking body and is not utilized to measure the academic standards of the institutions. Its purpose is to assist international students in identifying popular universities or colleges in a specific country based on the popularity of their websites, providing a reference for selecting a higher education institution.

== Academics ==
=== Recognitions ===
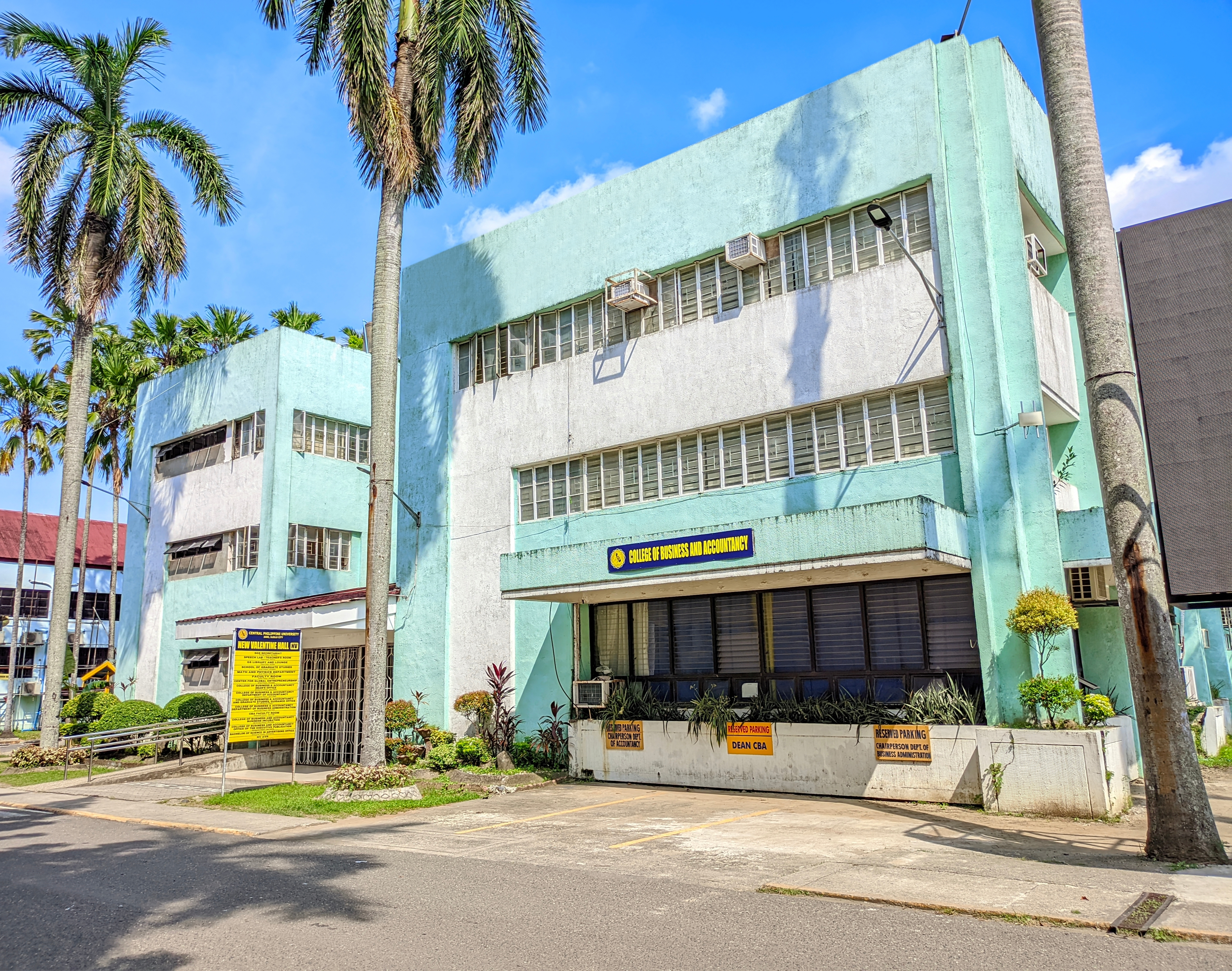
New Valentine Hall of the CPU College of Business and Accountancy.

In aspect of academic and non-academic designations, Central has been designated by various local, national, international and government agencies. The College of Engineering has been designated by the Department of Science and Technology as the only engineering School for Western Visayas while the College of Agriculture, Resources and Environmental as Commission on Higher Education (Philippines) – National Agriculture and Fisheries Education System (CHED-NAFES) as one of the Center of Excellence for Agricultural Education in the country. The basic education department of Junior High School is also designated as the sole Department of Science and Technology – Engineering and Science Education Program (DOST-ESEP) Division Leader School for Western Visayas region and likewise it is one of the 15 Network High Schools in the Philippines.

The Commission on Higher Education has also granted the university a full autonomy status (one of the few in the Philippines) and it is one of the few International Organization for Standardization (ISO) certified institutions in the country in which its academic programs, instruction, research and extension programs, and facilities are in accordance with or of international standards.

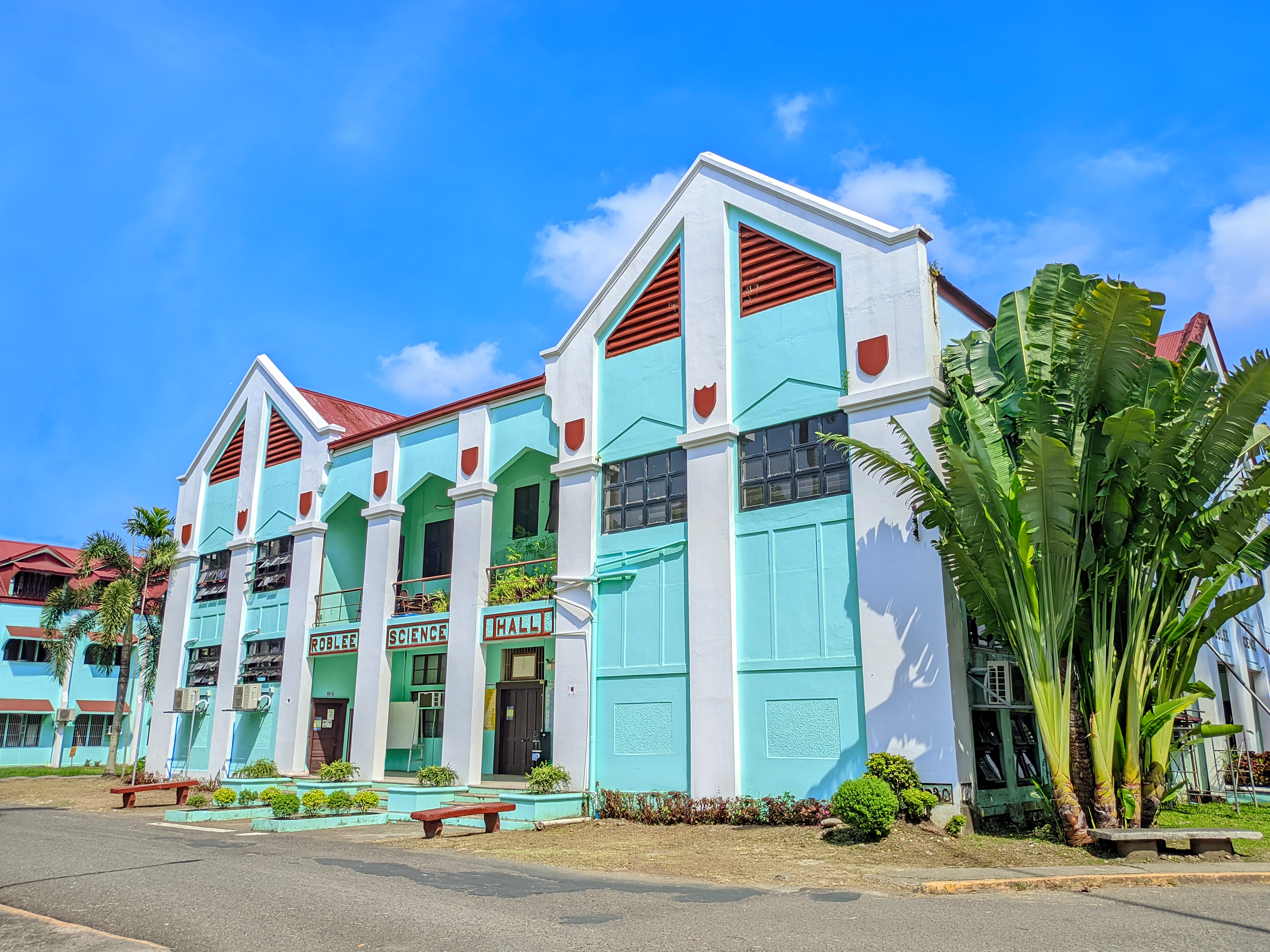
The Roblee Science Hall houses the biology and chemistry departments of the university.

Central has been accredited by various accreditation agencies like the Association of Christian Schools, Colleges and Universities (ACSCU) where it is a founding member also, the Philippine Accrediting Association of Schools, Colleges and Universities (PAASCU), and the Association of Christian Universities and Colleges in Asia (ACUCA), while the Association for Theological Education in South East Asia (ATESEA) solely for the university's College of Theology. In terms of accreditation status, the university ranks first in Western Visayas and third in the Philippines, with 15 of its programs designated as Level IV (the highest level of accreditation in the Philippines that can be granted to an individual program) in the programs of Accountancy, Business Administration, Social Sciences, Liberal Arts and Sciences, and Education.

Central has also designated by the Commission on Higher Education as National Centers of Excellence in Agricultural Education and Business Administration and National Centers of Development in Chemical Engineering, Electrical Engineering, Electronics Engineering and Teacher Education, where the university ranks first in the Western Visayas region (4th in the whole Visayas) in terms of the said number of designations. The Civil Engineering likewise on the other hand has also been designated by the Department of Science and Technology as Center for Civil Engineering Education for Western Visayas.

=== Schools and colleges ===
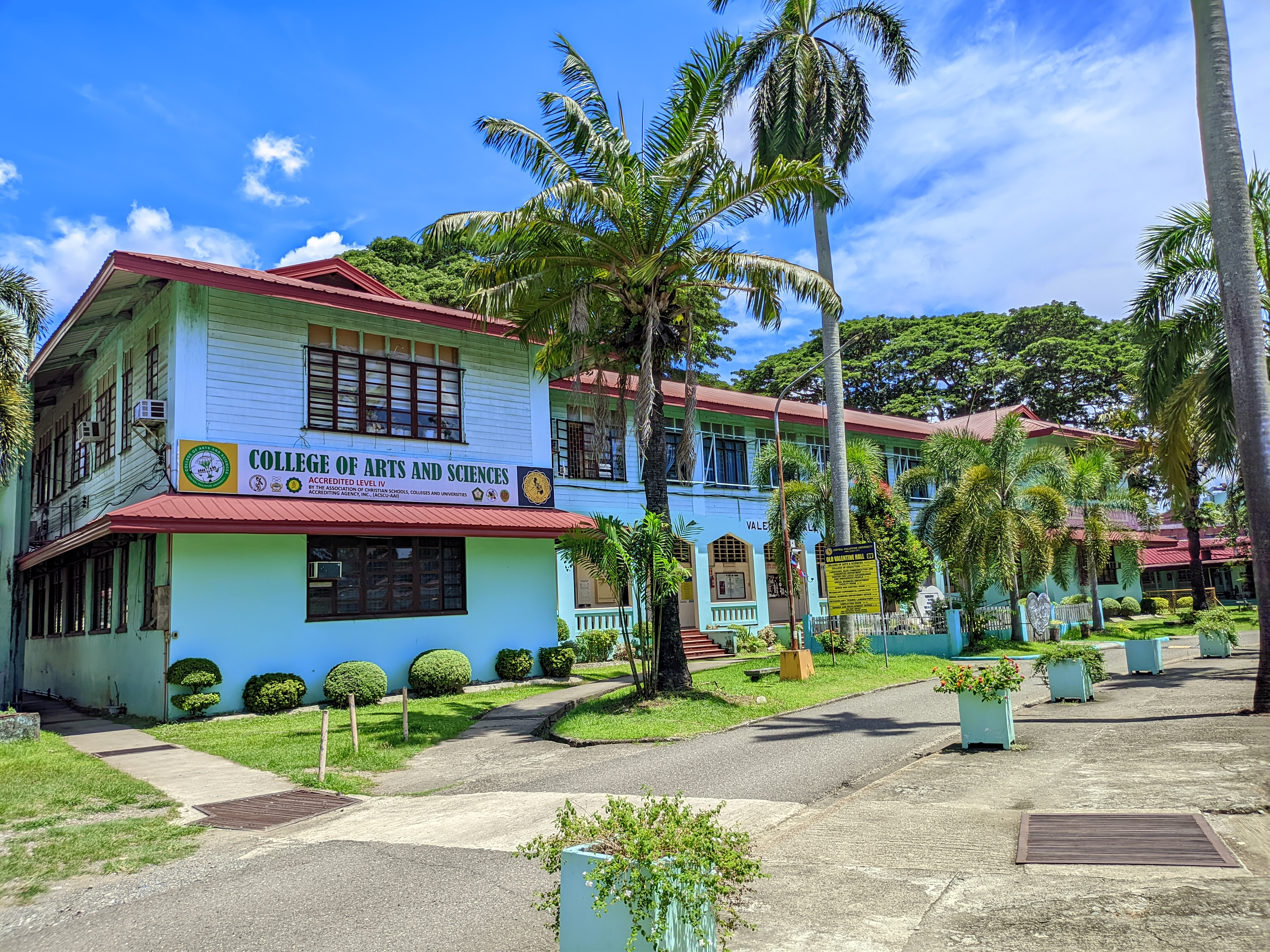
The Valentine Hall of the CPU College of Education and CPU College of Arts and Sciences.

Commission on Higher Education
(CHED) Philippines
National Centers of Excellence (COE)
Agriculture
Business Administration
National Centers of Development (COD)
Chemical Engineering
Electrical Engineering
Electronics Engineering
Teacher Education

Central's academic bodies consists of three graduate and professional schools/colleges, eleven undergraduate colleges, the CPU Review and Continuing Education Center (a review and continuing education center), and four basic education schools. CPU consist also a library system, Central Philippine University Press (CPU Press), four basic education schools, while the university's medical center, the Iloilo Mission Hospital, is separate from the main campus.

CPU is consist of eighteen academic units (schools and colleges) that provides instruction from basic education all the way up to the post-graduate levels. In the undergraduate and graduate levels, its disciplines include Accountancy and Allied Accounting Studies, Advertising, Agriculture, Arts, Biological Sciences, Business Administration, Chemistry, Computer Studies, Digital Media and Interactive Arts, Economics, Engineering Sciences, Entrepreneurship, Environmental Sciences, Hospitality Management, Law, Library Science, Mass Communication (Journalism), Medical Laboratory Science, Medicine, Nursing, Pharmacy, Lifestyle and Fitness Management, Political Science, Psychology, Public Administration, Real Estate Management, Rehabilitation Science, Religious Music, Social Work, Teacher Education, Theology and Tourism.

Central is one of the two leaders in the Visayas and Mindanao based on endowment fund with current endowment between Php 150–200 million, which is specifically for research, academic and other purposes. The university has more than 182 Endowment programs and with a total of 433 Endowment Funds that is still on-going.

Graduate/Professional Schools and Colleges
College of Dentistry (Defunct)
College of Law
College of Medicine
School of Graduate Studies
Undergraduate Schools and Colleges
College of Agriculture, Resources and Environmental Sciences
College of Arts and Sciences
College of Business and Accountancy
College of Computer Studies
College of Education
College of Engineering
College of Medical Laboratory Science
College of Nursing
College of Pharmacy
College of Theology
Lucio Tan College of Hospitality Management
(Dr. Lucio C. Tan College of Hospitality Management)

Central Philippine University is one of few private higher educational institutions in the Philippines that have been granted full autonomous status by the Commission on Higher Education (CHED), the same government agency that accredited some of its programs as Centers of Development. CPU is also one out of few ISO certified educational institutions in the Philippines. ISO (International Organization for Standardization) is a network of the national standards institutes of 153 countries, on the basis of one member per country. The Bureau of Product Standards has been the Philippines representative to ISO, of which the said institute, has accredited the university as an International Organization for Standardization (ISO) certified institution.

The university college academic programs operate on a semester system in which the academic year is divided into two terms (Including Summer [March or April–May]): July to October, and November to April. The school year typically begins in late June or early July and ends in mid-April. However, the two basic education schools of the university: Elementary School and High School, runs on a non-semester system, but has a summer term classes, offered by each basic education schools. The Senior High School on the other hand operates in 2 semesters just like the college.

Presently, the university confers bachelor's, master's, and doctoral degrees all accredited by either PAASCU (a member of FAAP), ACSCU-AAI, ACSC-AAI, ATESEA and assisted by EDPITAF in its 18 schools and colleges.

The university grants Bachelor of Arts and Bachelor of Science degrees in more than 30 academic majors and including minors, in nine undergraduate Colleges. Programs offered in the undergraduate level are Liberal Arts and Science, Hospitality Management, Tourism, Theology, Engineering, Business and Accountancy, Information Technology, Library and Information Science, Pharmacy, Medical Technology, Mass Communications, Public Administration and Political Science, Nursing, Teaching Education, Multimedia and Advertising, Agriculture and Environmental Sciences.

The Agriculture, Engineering, Business and Accountancy and Teacher Education programs are CHED Centers of Excellence and Centers of Development.

Central ranks first among other universities in Western Visayas in Commission on Higher Education (Philippines) Centers of Development and Centers of Excellence List with six of the university programs designated by the Commission on Higher Education (Philippines) as Centers of Development and Excellence.

Recently, through international collaborations with other institutions in different countries has made CPU to offer like undergraduate degree in Business Administration and Accountancy programs especially at the Thai Nguyen University of Economics and Business Administration in Vietnam.

==== Higher education ====
The baccalaureate academic studies are offered and undertaken in the undergraduate schools and colleges of the university. The professional, graduate and post-graduate studies on the other hand, are undertaken in the university's graduate and professional granting degree academic units which include a wide array of master's, diploma and doctorate academic degree programs – social sciences, business, education, library and information science, information technology, English studies & communication, liberal studies, nursing, psychology/counseling, agriculture and engineering. The College of Medicine which is a professional degree granting school which offers Doctor of Medicine program, has undergraduate academic degrees attached under its arm, the Respiratory Therapy and Health, Fitness and Lifestyle Management (HFLM). The Juris Doctor (J.D.) and Master of Laws are offered under the College of Law.

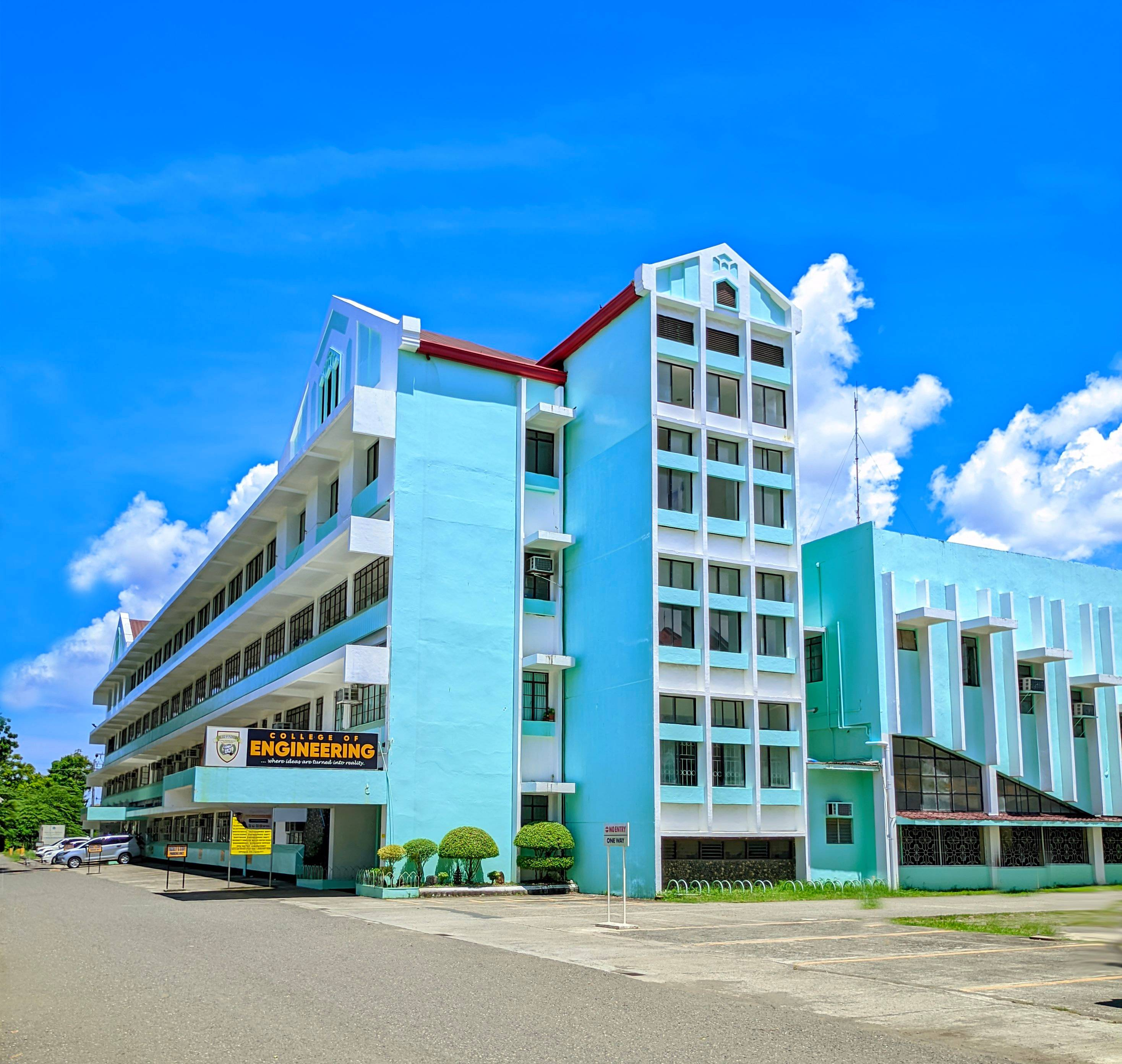
The Engineering Building was built through James Lester Knox, the former dean of the CPU College of Engineering. Part of the structure is the CPU Affiliated Renewable Energy Center and laboratories of all the undergraduate engineering programs including the pioneer programs of Software Engineering and Packaging Engineering (both firsts in the country).

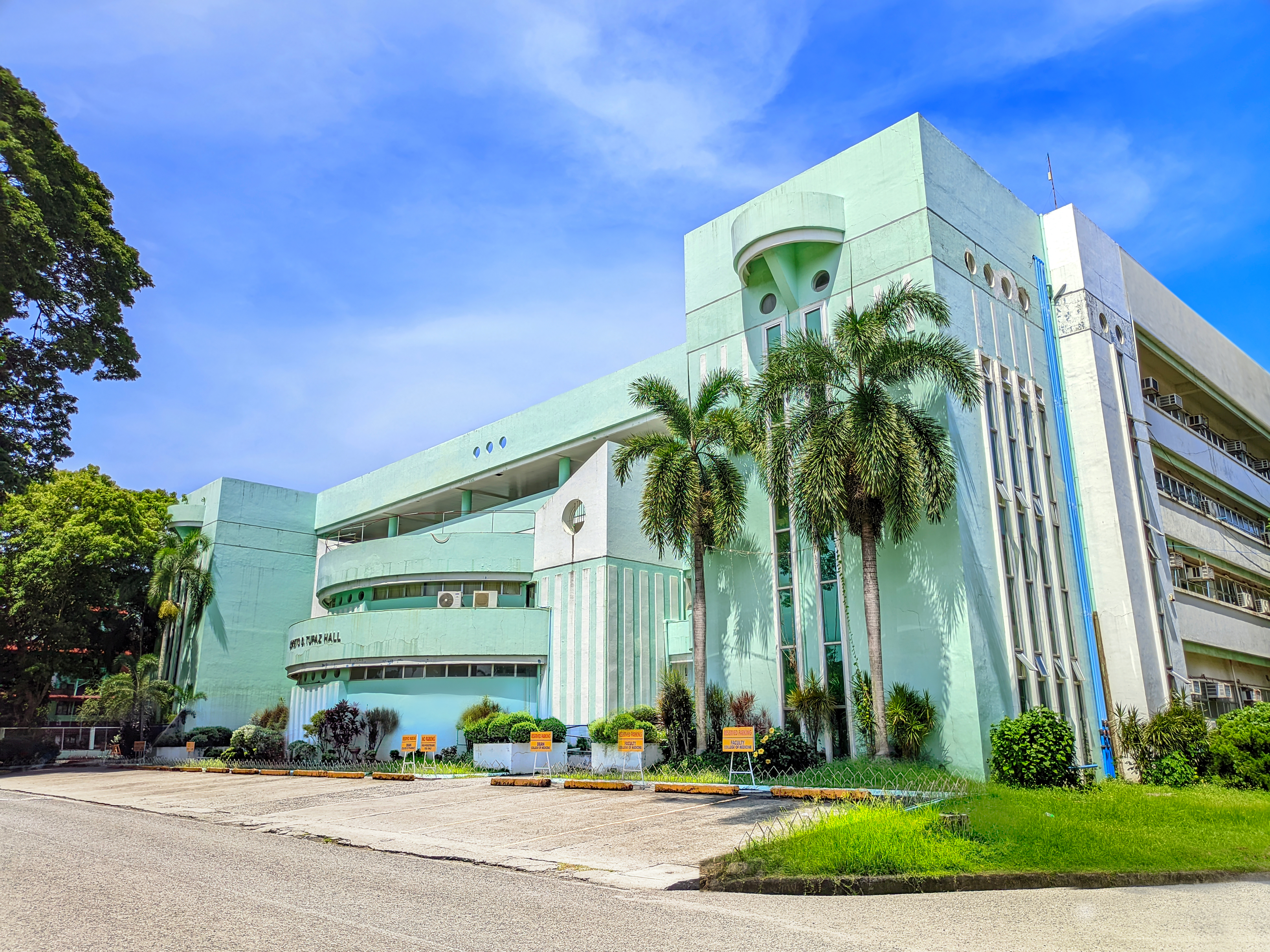
Loreto D. Tupaz Hall of the CPU College Nursing (the first nursing school in the Philippines established in 1906).

The College of Dentistry which was opened in 1948, is one of the professional degree granting schools of Central. Due to the cost the university may cover for its expansion for a modern dental school, it was closed on March 31, 1954.

The tertiary education schools and colleges of the university include:

- The College of Agriculture, Resources and Environmental Sciences – established by Burl Slocum, an American agriculturist. It is the first government recognized agricultural school outside Luzon. It offers undergraduate or Bachelor of Science degrees in agriculture, Agricultural and Biosystems Engineering and Environmental Management. Accredited by PAASCU (Philippine Accrediting Association of Schools, Colleges and Universities) as Level II and is also the first and only agricultural school designated by the Commission on Higher Education (Philippines) as Center of Excellence in Agriculture in Western Visayas region. The College of Agriculture, Resources and Environmental Sciences has been also designated as CHED-NAFES provincial agricultural center for Iloilo and Panay.

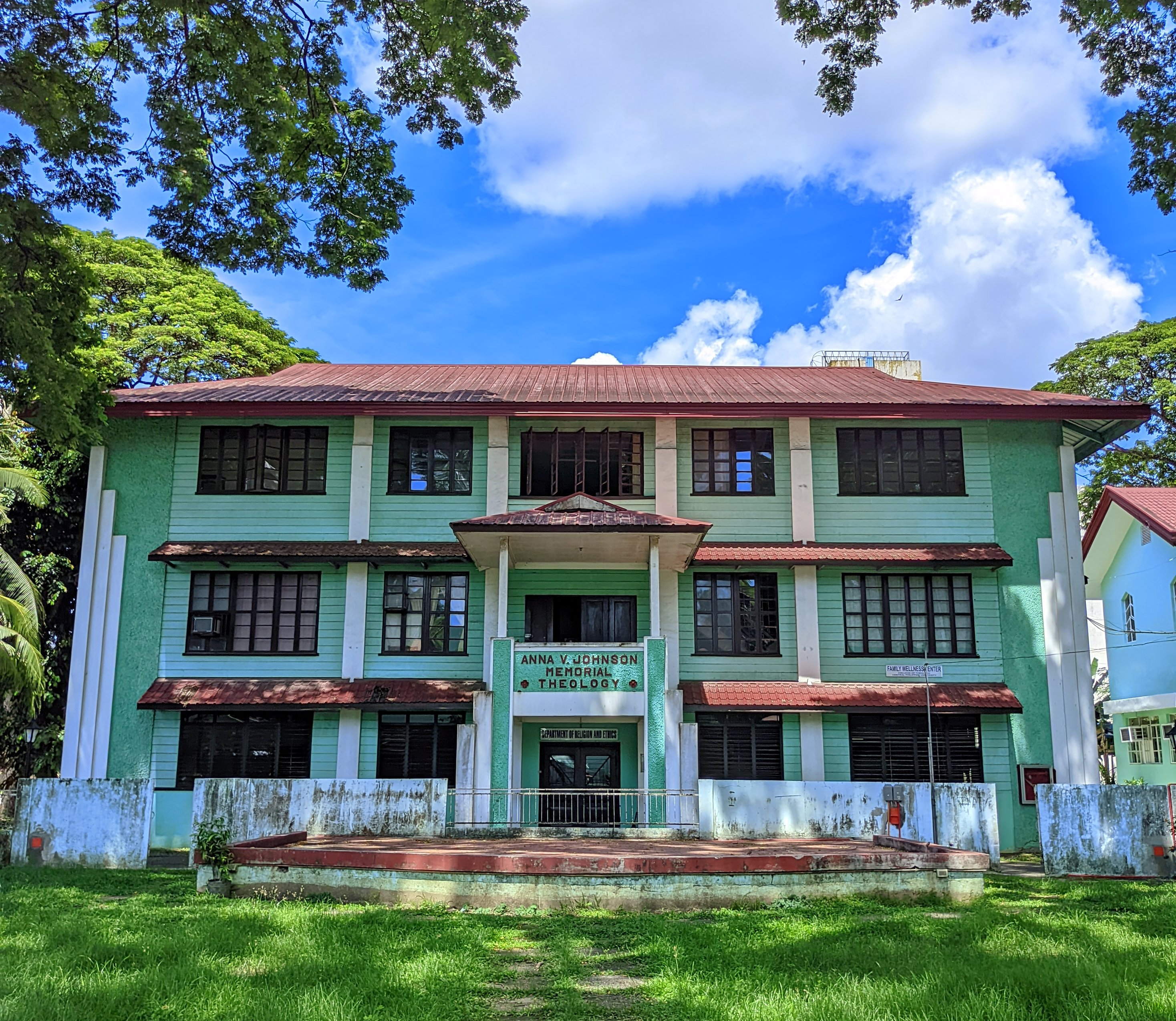
Johnson Hall houses the religion and ethics department and college dormitory of the CPU College of Theology.

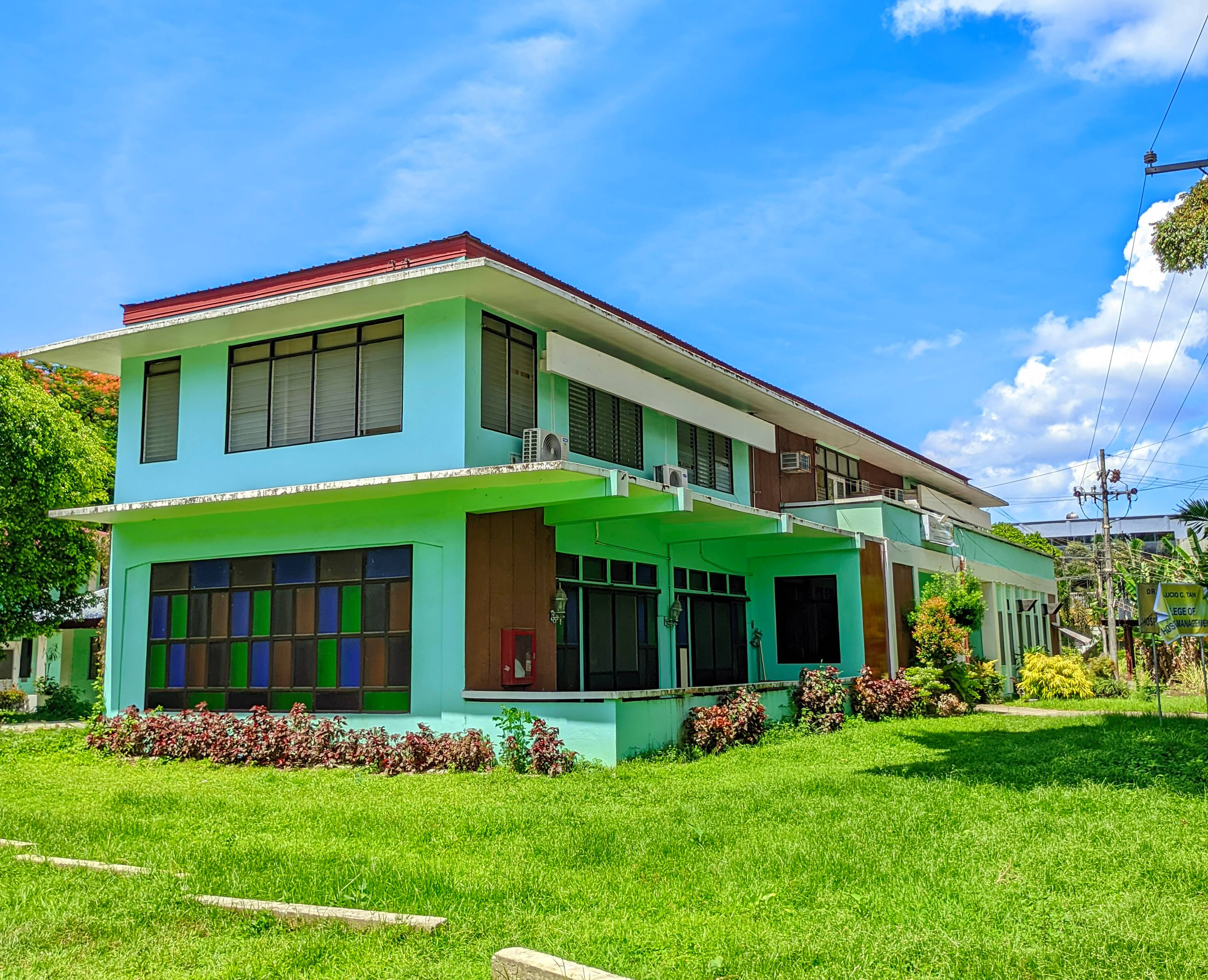
Lucio Tan Building of the CPU Lucio Tan College of Hospitality Management.

- The College of Arts and Sciences – the liberal arts and sciences college of the university established in 1925. It offers courses in Mathematics, Mass Communications, Biology, Micro-biology, Languages, Literature and Humanities. Some of its academic programs are designated by the Association of Christian Schools, Colleges and Universities Accrediting Agency Incorporated (ACSCU-AAI) as Level III and Level IV.
- The College of Business and Accountancy – established in the 1935 as one of the oldest American established business schools in the Philippines. Originally named as the College of Commerce, it was changed to its present name during the presidency of Juanito M. Acanto. It offers baccalaureate degrees in Accountancy, Accounting Technology, Advertising, Business Administration (majors in Business Management, Financial Management (Banking and Finance), Marketing Management and Entrepreneurship) and Real Estate Management. The school is also Level IV in accreditation in some of its programs by the Association of Christian Schools, Colleges and Universities (ACSCU-AAI). The College of Business and Accountancy is the only business school in the Western Visayas region that has been designated by the Commission on Higher Education (Philippines) as Center of Excellence in Business Administration. It is also the only business school with Level IV accredited (the highest level of accreditation for a program in the Philippines) programs in Panay.
- The College of Computer Studies – established in early 2000, it is a CISCO Networking Academy and ORACLE Academic Initiative Partner computer college, it offers computing science baccalaureate programs in Computer Science, Digital Media and Interactive Arts, Information Technology and Library and Information Science.
- The College of Education – a Center of Development in Teacher Education designated by the Commission on Higher Education (Philippines) and an Association of Christian Schools, Colleges and Universities (ACSCU-AAI) Level III & IV accredited teachers college, it offers programs in Early Childhood Education, Elementary Education, Physical Education and Secondary Education (majors in English, Filipino, Mathematics, Science, Special Needs Education, Bachelor in Sports Match Analysis
- The College of Engineering – founded by Harland Francis Chandler Stuart, the 7th president of Central in 1936, it is one of the oldest engineering schools established by the Americans in the Philippines. It offers baccalaureate academic degrees in Chemical Engineering, Civil Engineering, Electrical Engineering, Electronics Engineering, Mechanical Engineering, Packaging Engineering and Software Engineering. The Commission on Higher Education (Philippines) designated the college as a centers of development in Chemical Engineering, Electrical Engineering and Electronics Engineering (the only engineering school in the Western Visayas region and one of the few in the country with "center of development" designation). It is also named as Department of Science and Technology (DOST) Engineering school, Heat Transfer Facility and Center for Civil Engineering Education for Western Visayas region and is accredited by the Philippine Accrediting Association of Schools, Colleges and Universities. The college has various research and auxiliary centers under its umbrella which includes the CPU Affiliated Renewable Energy Center (serves the whole Western Visayas area which is funded jointly by the Department of Energy (Philippines)) and the CPU Philippine Center for Packaging Engineering and Technology, the first of its kind in the South East Asia (backed by the college's department of Packaging Engineering and the Department of Science and Technology (Philippines).) The college collaborates since 2012 in the fields of Transportation and Structural engineering research with De la Salle University. The college's programs of Bachelor of Science in Packaging Engineering and Bachelor of Science in Software are both firsts in the Philippines. The College of Engineering also ranks first among other engineering schools in the Western Visayas region based on licensure examinations and the only engineering with Commission on Higher Education (Philippines) Center of Development programs designation. It has been chosen by the Educational Development Projects Implementing Task Force (EDPITAF) as one of the ten resource-based schools of engineering in the country. The college also is one of the Priority Engineering Schools in Panay, a Department of Science and Technology (DOST) School, Center for Civil Engineering Education, and Heat Treatment Facility for Western Visayas. The college is Commission on Higher Education (Philippines) Centers of Development in Chemical Engineering, Electrical Engineering and Electronics Engineering.

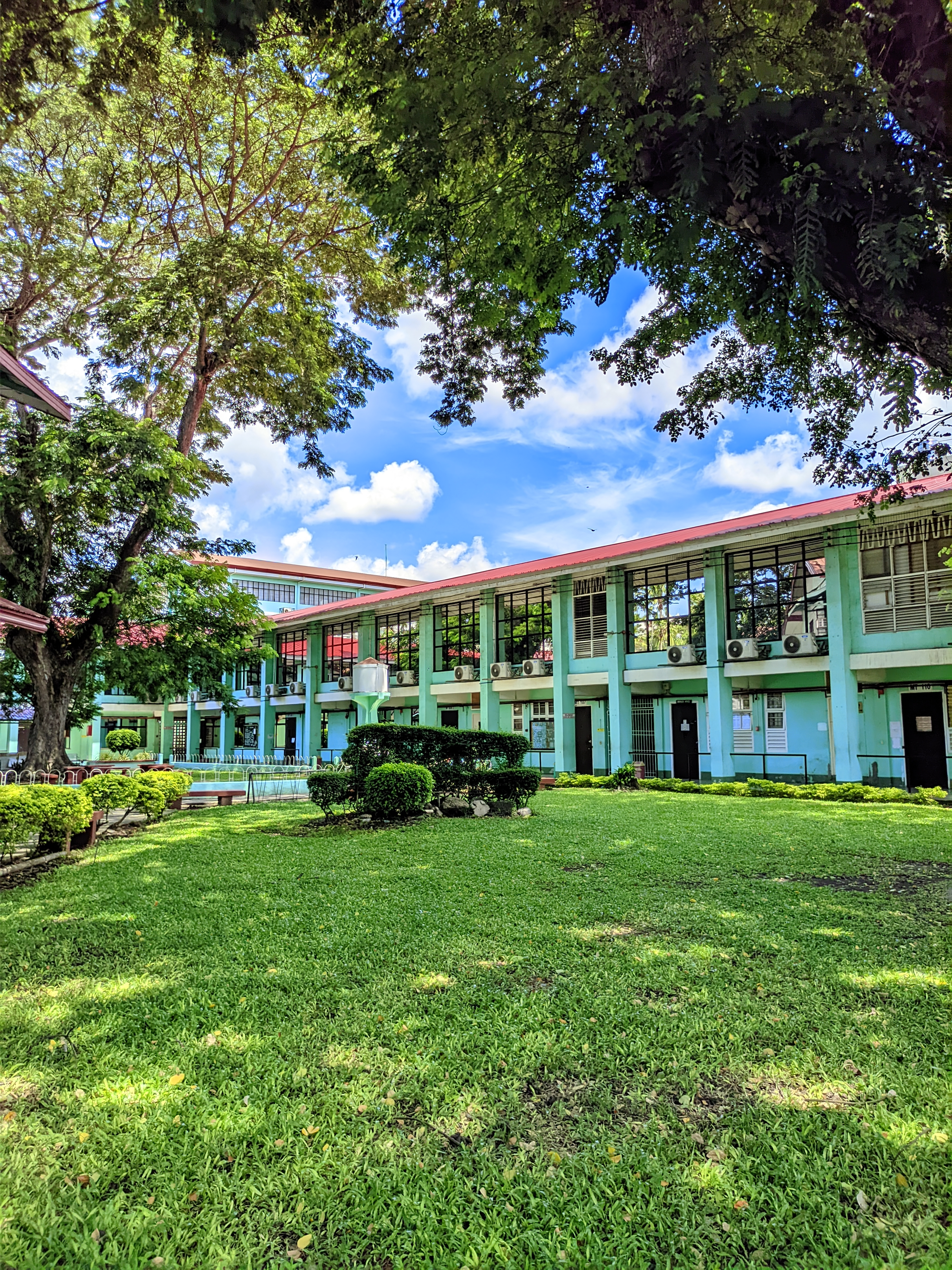
The Mary Thomas Hall of the CPU College of Computer Studies.

- The College of Law – established in the 1930s and confers the Bachelor of Laws (LLB) degree. In 2012 later, the college changed the Bachelor of Laws program to Juris Doctor (JD) program. The Juris Doctor (JD) program of the College of Law is the first Juris Doctor (JD) program in any Law schools in the Philippines approved by the Philippine Legal Education Board. The College of Law in collaboration with San Beda College of Law offers Master of Laws (LL.M. ).
- The College of Medical Laboratory Science – a newly established college in 2017 with one academic degree offered under it, the Bachelor of Science in Medical Laboratory Science, it dates back its establishment when the said academic program was founded under the College of Arts and Sciences in the 1960s. The academic course from the college was folded along with the university's pharmacy program into when the College of Nursing was reorganized in 2014 as College of Nursing and Allied Health Sciences. In 2017, the College of Nursing stemmed into three separate colleges resulting for the medical laboratory science program to establish as College of Medical Laboratory Science.
- The College of Medicine – established in 2003, is one of the youngest colleges and professional schools of the university. The Doctor of Medicine (M.D.) program was the sole academic program offered by the college but later the bachelor's programs of Respiratory Therapy and Health, Fitness and Lifestyle Management were added in the college.
- The College of Nursing – established in 1906 as the Union Mission Hospital Training School for Nurses by the American Presbyterian missionary and medical doctor Joseph A. Hall, the College of Nursing is the first nursing school in the Philippines. The school was incorporated from CPU–Iloilo Mission Hospital to the Central Philippine University after World War II and is thereafter up to the present, forming as one of the university's organic academic degree granting college. It offers baccalaureate degree in Nursing and graduate programs through the university's School of Graduate Studies. The school's milestones include producing the first three nursing graduates, the first topnotcher and the first nursing school to become the number one top-performing school all in the history of nursing profession, education and licensure examination in the Philippines. It was renamed to College of Nursing and Allied Health Sciences in 2014. It stemmed into three separate colleges in August 2017 namely the College of Medical Laboratory Science and the College of Pharmacy while the college left to revert its name to the College of Nursing.

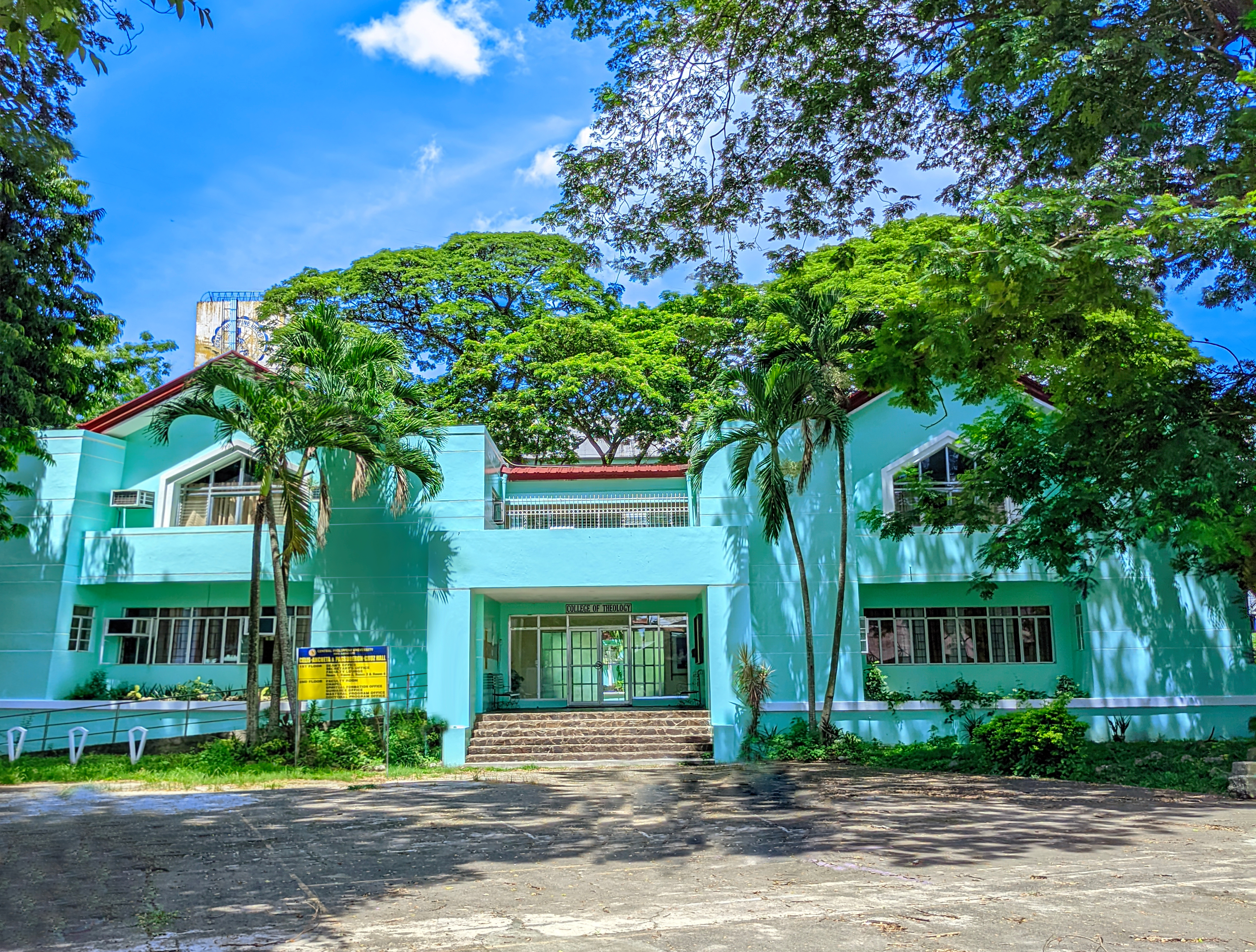
The Celiz-Ancheta and Pasugberon-Cruz Hall of the CPU College of Theology.

- The College of Pharmacy – a re-established college in 2017 after the College of Nursing and Allied Health Sciences was re-organized into 3 colleges, it dates back its founding years after the World War II. The college offers Bachelor of Science in Pharmacy degree.

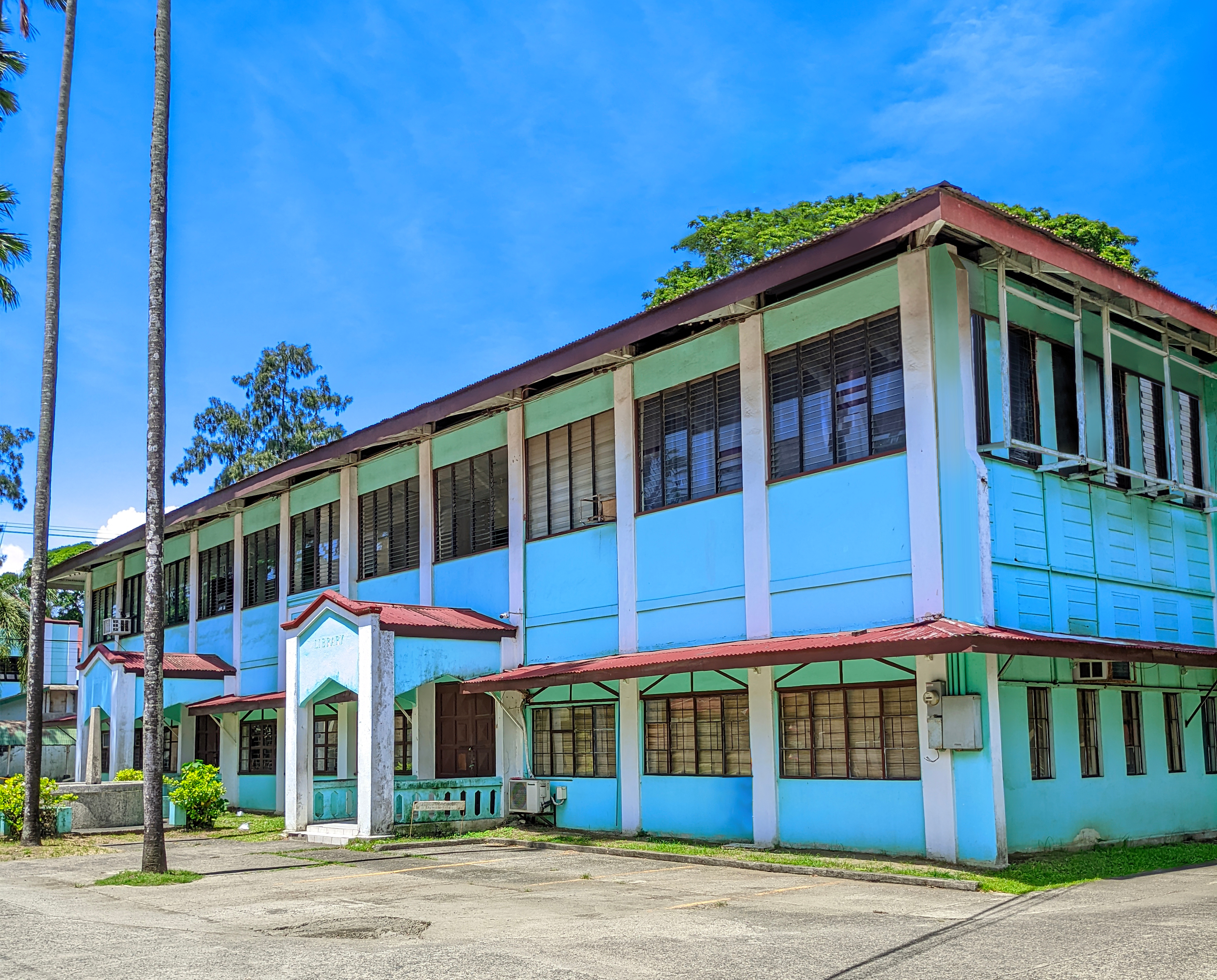
The Eugenio Lopez Memorial Hall (Eugenio Lopez Hall) formerly houses the CPU College of Law.

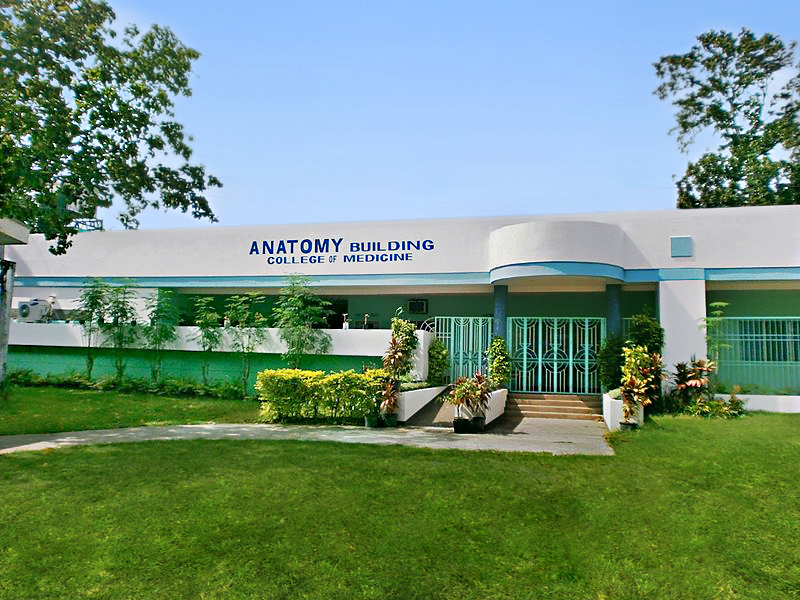
CPU College of Medicine Anatomy Building.

- The College of Theology – the university's seminary, it was founded four months before the formal founding of Central's precursor, the Jaro Industrial School, in October 1905, and is the oldest degree-granting unit of the university. It is also the first Baptist theological seminary in the Philippines. The College of Theology was later merged in 1924, a year after the Jaro Industrial School became a junior college in 1923. The college has two departments – Religion and Ethics and Music. It offers baccalaureate and certificate academic degrees in theology and sacred music while its graduate theological are offered through the School of Graduate Studies. The College of Theology is a member and accredited by the Association for Theological Education in South East Asia (ATESEA) and shares strong linkage with its sister theological seminary, the Silliman University Divinity School.
- The Lucio Tan College of Hospitality Management (Dr. Lucio C. Tan College of Hospitality Management) – the second youngest undergraduate and graduate academic degree granting college after the College of Medicine of Central. Forming as a part of College of Education, it separated and became Institute of HRM and Tourism in 2005. At present, it is named in honor of the famous Chinese-Filipino business tycoon Lucio C. Tan, whose endowment donation was responsible for the re-establishment of the college and expansion. Accredited by the Association of Christian Schools, Colleges and Universities, it offers undergraduate academic degrees in Hospitality Management and Tourism Management.
- The School of Graduate Studies – established during the presidency of Linnea Nelson, first woman president of Central Philippine University. It offers graduate and post-graduate studies in management (with majors in Public Management, Developmental Management, Business Management Tourism and Hospitality Management), Education (Doctorate, Master of Arts), Theology (Doctor of Ministry, Master of Divinity, Master of Ministry and Master of Theology), Public Administration, Master in Business Administration, Master in Business Administration major in Tourism and Hospitality Management, Master in Computer Science and Master of Science in computer science, Master of Science in Guidance and Counseling, Master in Library and Information Science, Master in Library and Information Science major in Theological Librarianship, Master in Education major in Filipino (Non-Thesis), Master of Engineering (majors in Civil Engineering, Chemical Engineering, Electronics Engineering and Mechanical Engineering), Master in Engineering (majors in Engineering Education with specialization in Chemical Engineering, Civil Engineering and Mechanical Engineering) and Master of Arts in nursing. The school is also accredited by the Association of Christian Schools, Colleges and Universities where some its programs as either in LEVEL III or IV designations. The graduate and post-graduate degrees offered are in partnership with their respective undergraduate colleges where they're specially designated.

==== Overseas academic programs ====
CPU through a joint collaborative academic linkages with foreign institutions abroad, has earmarked the university to offer and established overseas academic programs in its partner universities in Vietnam. The first successful collaboration of Central for its establishment of academic programs abroad is with the universities of Thai Nguyen University of Economics and Business Administration (TUEBA) in Vietnam. Undergraduate and graduate academic programs jointly offered by CPU with both institutions include Business Administration and Public Administration (Doctorate in Management). Upon the graduation of the students of the said academic programs, they receive Central Philippine University and joint partner institutions academic diplomas and are automatically inducted as members of the CPU Alumni Association and the respective partner universities.

==== Basic education ====
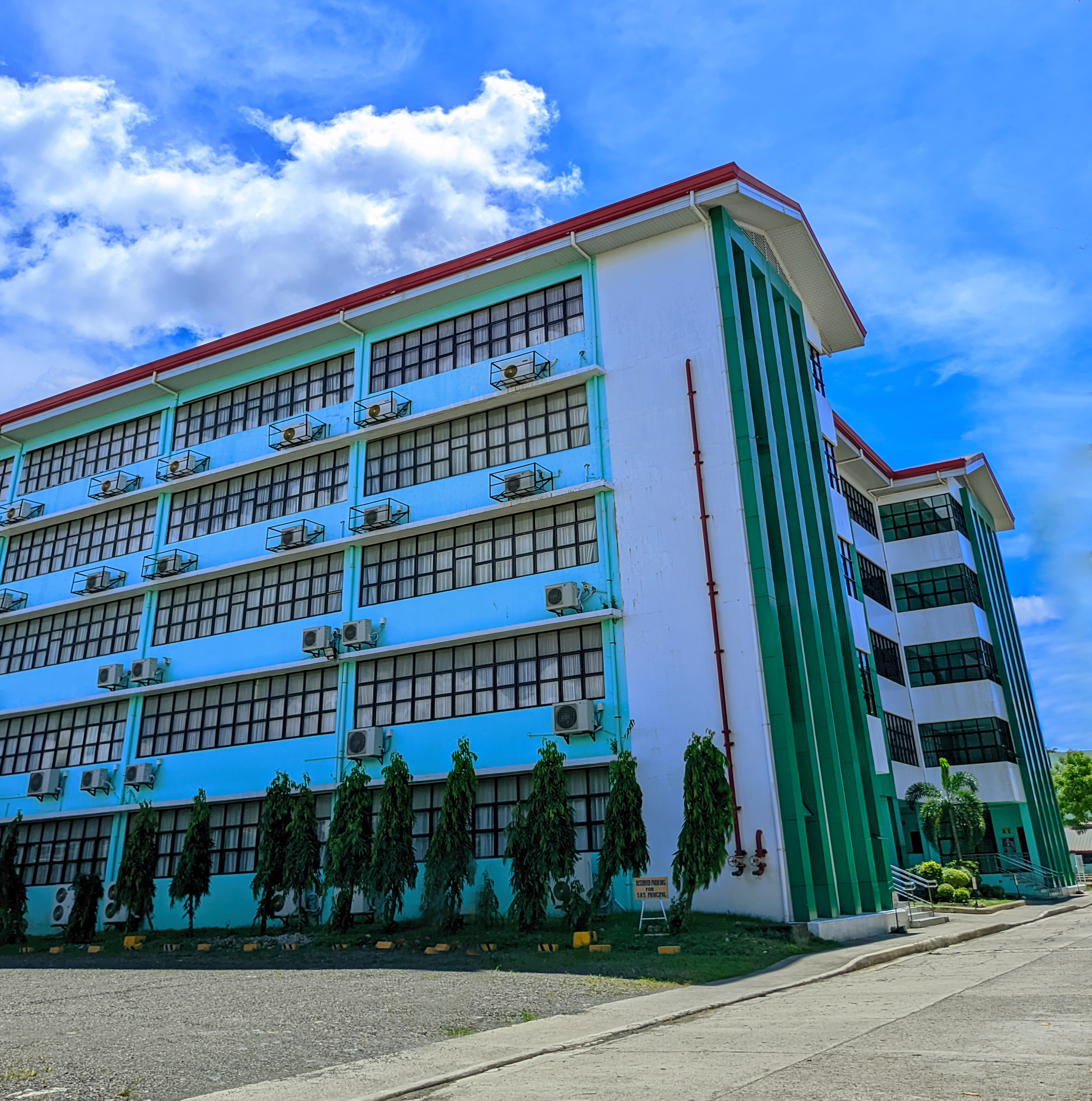
The CPU Senior High School Building.

Central Philippine University offers basic academic programs in Kindergarten, Elementary School, Junior High School and Senior High School. The university's two basic education departments, the Kindergarten and Elementary are both accredited by ACSCU-AAI as Level II while the Junior High School as Level III.

The junior high school department of the university, except that it is Accredited by ACSCU-AAI as Level III, it is the only EDPITAF-assisted and DOST/ESEP Division Leader School by the Department of Science and Technology for Western Visayas.

The Junior High School was also chosen as one of the few 15 Network High Schools in the Philippines.

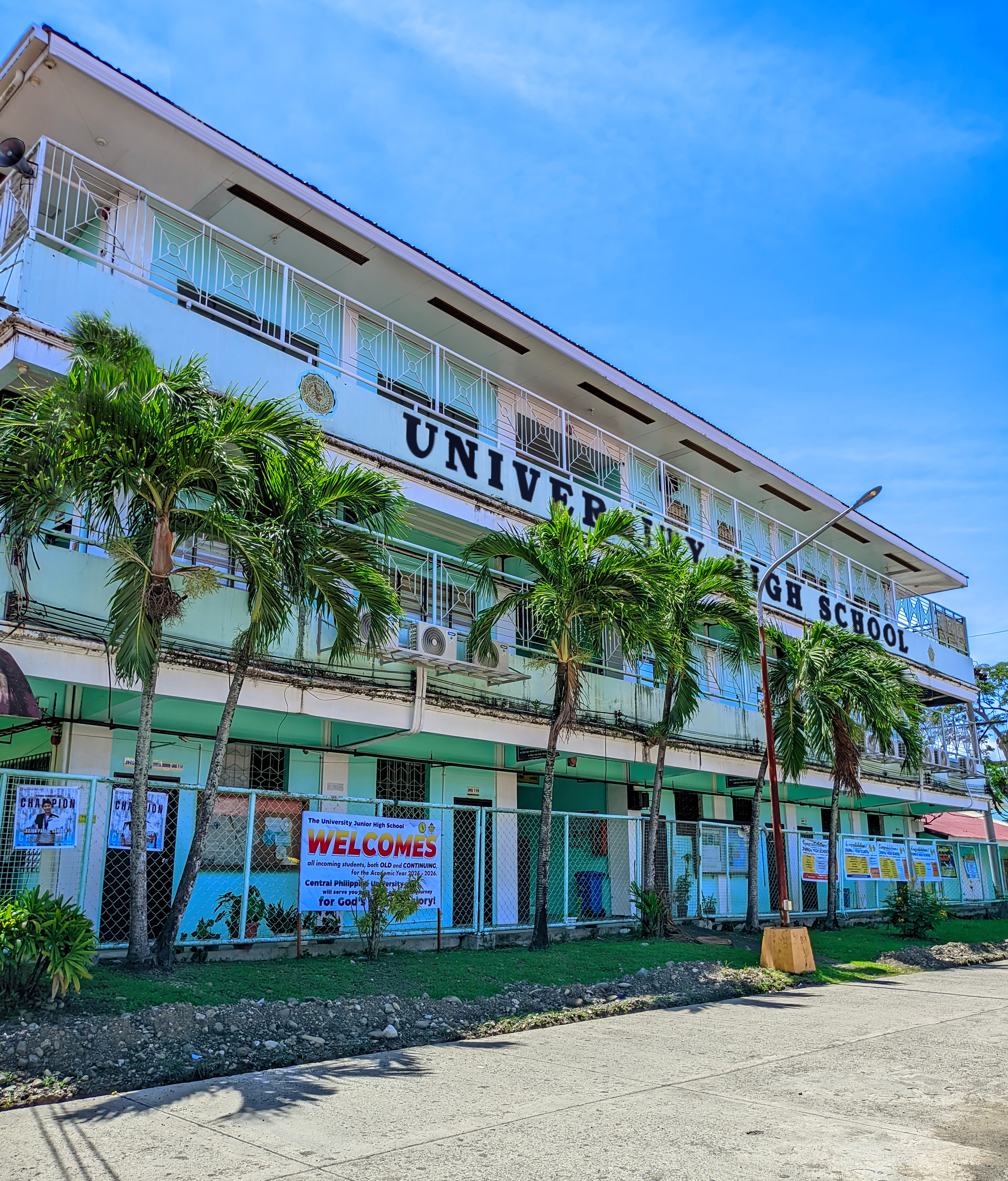
The CPU Junior High School Building.

The CPU Elementary School dates back its founding as precursor of Central in 1905. Same with the CPU Junior High School which was established in 1913, it was also served with William Orison Valentine as the founder and first principal. The elementary school offers complete elementary course from grade 1–6 while the junior high school grade 7–10 (both in regular and special science classes).

Basic Education Schools
Kindergarten
Elementary School
Junior High School
Senior High School

The university in accordance with new Kindergarten to 12 Basic Education program (K+12) by the Philippine government, which aligns and establishing the country par with the educational systems abroad like in the United States, Europe and other countries established the Senior High School department in 2016.

The Senior High School offers General Academic Strand (GAS) under the Academic track of the new Philippine K+12 (Kindergarten to 12 Basic Education program).

=== Library system ===
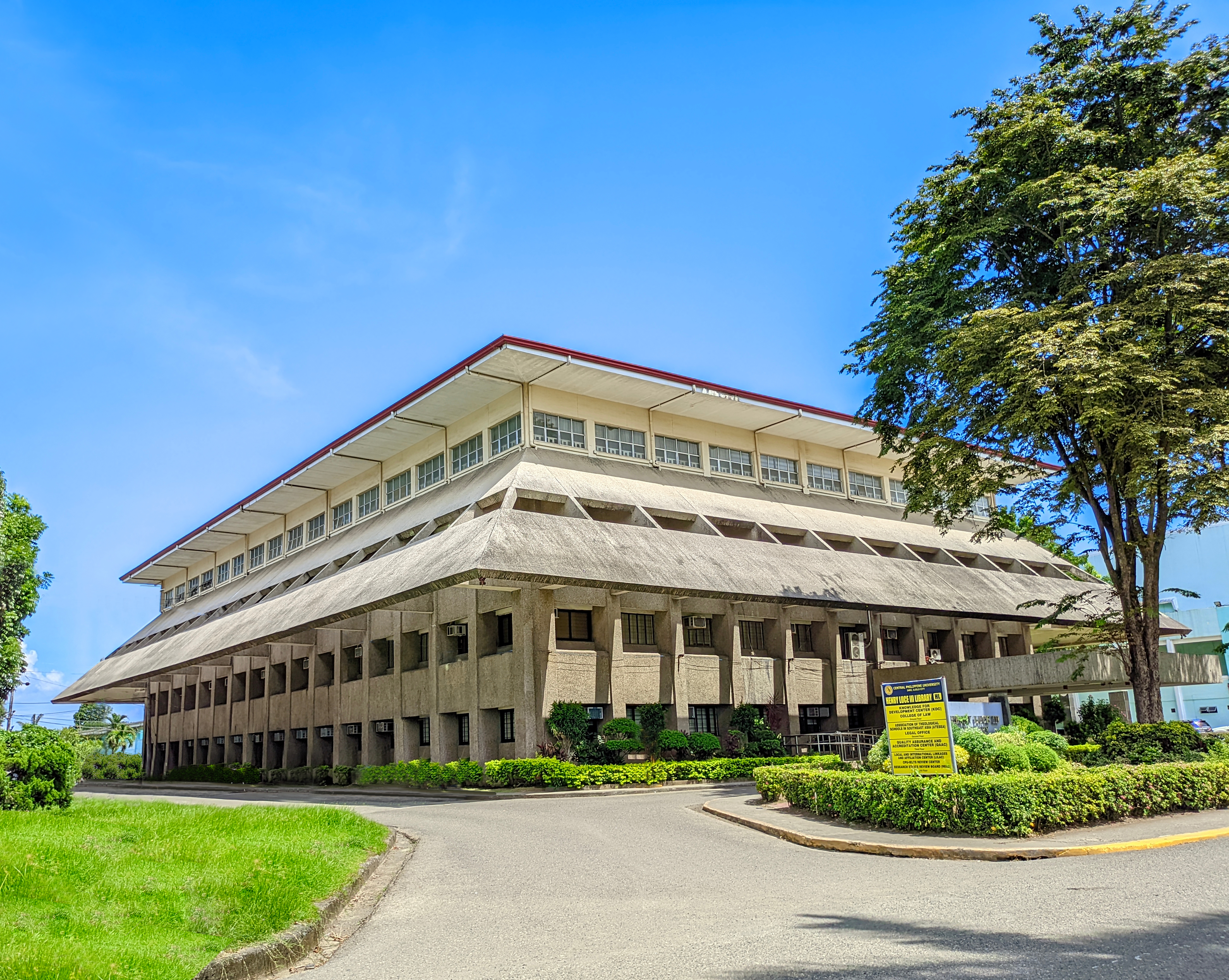
Henry Luce III Library, the main library of Central which encompasses the CPU Library System libraries.

Central's main library, the Henry Luce III Library encompasses the university's library system, which is composed of departmental and college libraries of Theology, Business and Law, Graduate Studies, High School and the Elementary school. Currently, the Henry Luce III Library holds more than 200,000+ volumes including holdings of special collections like the 40,000 United Nations Documents, World War II Documents, American Studies Resource Center, Meyer-Asian Collection, Food and Agriculture Organization and Elizabeth Knox Sacred Music Collection. At present, the Central Philippine University Library is the biggest library in Western Visayas (one of the largest in the Philippines) in terms of volumes and holdings.

The Hinilawod Epic Chant Recordings, housed at the main library, have been inscribed in UNESCO's Memory of the World Register. This is the second inscription for Iloilo City (after it was designated as the first UNESCO Creative City of Gastronomy in the Philippines) and the first documentary heritage to receive such recognition outside of Manila.

The Henry Luce III Library's (main library) structure was built by virtue of a grant given by Henry Luce III, a known philanthropist, and elder son of the founder and editor-in-chief of Time Inc., through the Henry Luce Foundation. It has been designated by the Philippine National Statistics Office on April 20, 1997, as National Statistics Office (NSO) Information Center for Western Visayan region. Consortium with the Silliman University library and the Trinity University of Asia through ACCORD Library Interconnection started in 2000. CPU Library's formal linkage in December 2002 was started with LIBRARY LINK, based at the Filipinas Heritage Library (in Makati), on Filipiniana materials.

Through linkages, Central Philippine University Library is a depository of the United Nations and the Food and Agriculture Organization (FAO). The library is a regular recipient of library materials from international and local organizations and centers such as the United Nations Educational, Scientific and Cultural Organization (UNESCO), Population Council in New York, National Library of the Philippines in Manila, Australian Centre for Publication Acquired for Development (ACPAD), Population Information Network, and the International Rice Research Institute (in Los Baños, Laguna, Philippines). Through the library system's American Studies Resource Center (ASRC), the only for Western Visayas and one of the few in the Philippines, which is located in the main library (Henry Luce III Library), is also a regular recipient from the: Thomas Jefferson Information Center (where the library has the said and one of the only 13 such centers in the Philippines) in Manila, and the United States Information Service. The American Studies Resource Center (ASRC) helps/assists students who want to study in the United States through its Educational Advising Program. A Knowledge for Development Center, donated by the World Bank in consortium with the university was launched in 2008 The CPU World Bank – Knowledge for Development Center is one of the few such centers which are hubs for dialogue and research on development issues established by the World Bank in key cities around the country in partnership with leading state and private universities. The main library is also the Philippine Institute for Development Studies (PIDS) repository for Western Visayas.

=== Medical centers ===
CPU–Iloilo Mission Hospital serves as the university hospital of Central. The hospital is separate and distinct as an entity that operates independently from the university with its own board of trustees and corporation. Although serving as a community hospital in general, CPU–Iloilo Mission Hospital serves as a training, teaching, and as laboratory facility for various medical-related internships; off-campus classes programs of the university colleges and departments of Nursing, Medicine, Medical Laboratory Sciences, Pharmacy and other allied health sciences, while the College of Theology (for its chaplaincy program); and supports the whole medical needs of the whole university. The former president of the university, Juanito Maca Acanto, serves as the CPU–Iloilo Mission Hospital's chairman.

There is also the CPU Birthing Center which is located on the main campus that operates with medical and healthcare staff both from the university and CPU–Iloilo Mission Hospital. The CPU Birthing Center was built to serve the surrounding community exclusively for pregnant women. Central Philippine University also through its College of Nursing maintains a linkage with the Capiz Emmanuel Hospital in Roxas City, Capiz. The hospital was also founded by Baptist American missionaries in 1913 which serves at present as the university hospital of the Filamer Christian University.

Two other auxiliary medical/healthcare institutions of the university include the CPU Clinical Laboratory and CPU Kabalaka Reproductive Health Clinic also on the university's main campus (just like the CPU Birthing Center, both are staffed by healthcare workers serving the surrounding community).

CPU–Iloilo Mission Hospital sits on 7.56 acres (3.0 hectares) of land in Jaro, Iloilo City. The 230–300 bed hospital's location is separate from the main campus of the university. It offers a wide array of comprehensive medical and allied health services available to the university's students and to the community in general. It was established in 1901 by Joseph Andrew Hall, a Physician, and missionary under the Presbyterian Foreign Mission Board, to serve as a venue for the treatment of health care to the very poor, and has the distinction today as the first Protestant and American hospital in the Philippines.

The hospital transferred locations many times since its founding. First at Ledesma Street (Calle Amparo) as a small dispensary and at Iznart Street where the present Young Men Christian Association (YMCA) is currently located. The third and present site where the hospital stands is a property bought by the American Baptist Foreign Mission Society in Jaro District in 1931.

The hospital pioneered nursing education in the country through the establishment of its Union Mission Training School for Nurses in 1906, the first nursing school in the Philippines. After World War II, the school for nurses was transferred to Central Philippine University and eventually renamed Central Philippine University College of Nursing. It also produced the first three nursing graduates, and the first topnotcher and board passer in the history nursing education, licensure examination and profession in the Philippines.

The recent expansion of the hospital includes a two-story CPU-IMH Medical Education Training Center (CPU-IMH METC) for CPU's College of Medicine, four-story modern (IMH) Iloilo Mission Hospital Medical Arts Building, and the seven-story modernly designed Iloilo Mission Hospital Medical Center (IMH Medical Center).

== Research and extension ==
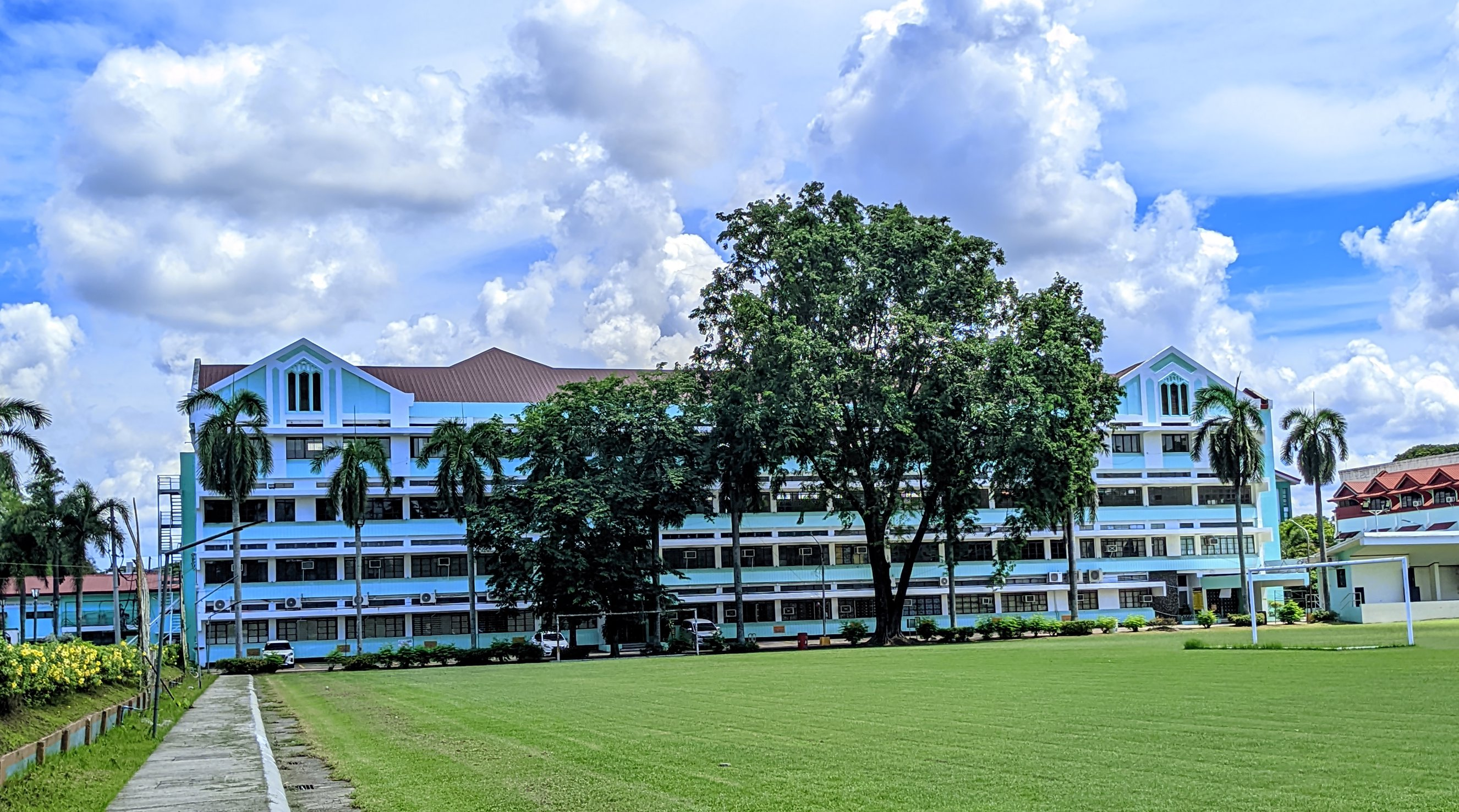
The Engineering Building houses research and extension centers which include the CPU-Affiliated Renewable Energy Center (CPU-AREC) for Western Visayas (jointly funded by the Department of Energy), CPUGAD Technology Business Incubator (CPUGAD TBI) (established jointly with CHED, and the Department of Science and Technology Heat Transfer Facility for the Western Visayas region. The college collaborates since 2012 also with the De la Salle University for Structural engineering and Transportation research.

Research units and activities are supervised under the umbrella of the newly established Office of University Vice-president for Research, Development, and Extension on August 1, 2025.

The university, has an active research and extension program that cover various researchers and extension activities. Central collaborates since then with various national and local government agencies, non-profit organizations, international and local industries and institutions for research in different fields.

The university annually holds a Research and Development Week. In 2006, the Philippine Commission on Higher Education (Philippines) (CHED) awarded CPU Research Center research program as one of the 2006 Best Higher Education Institution (HEI) Research Program in the country and the lone awardee from Region 6. In 2011 also, the university received the Best Higher Education Institution Research Program Award and a Plaque of Recognition as 1st Regional Qualifier for Best Higher Education Institution Research Program (BHEIRP) by the said Philippine government agency for higher education, the Commission on Higher Education. The university is also identified and designated by Commission on Higher Education-National Agriculture and Fisheries Education System (CHED-NAFES) through its College of Agriculture, Resources and Environmental Sciences as the Iloilo-Provincial Institute for Agriculture, where being the host of the annual Regional CPU-Department of Agriculture (Philippines) Agri Research Fair and Exhibits.

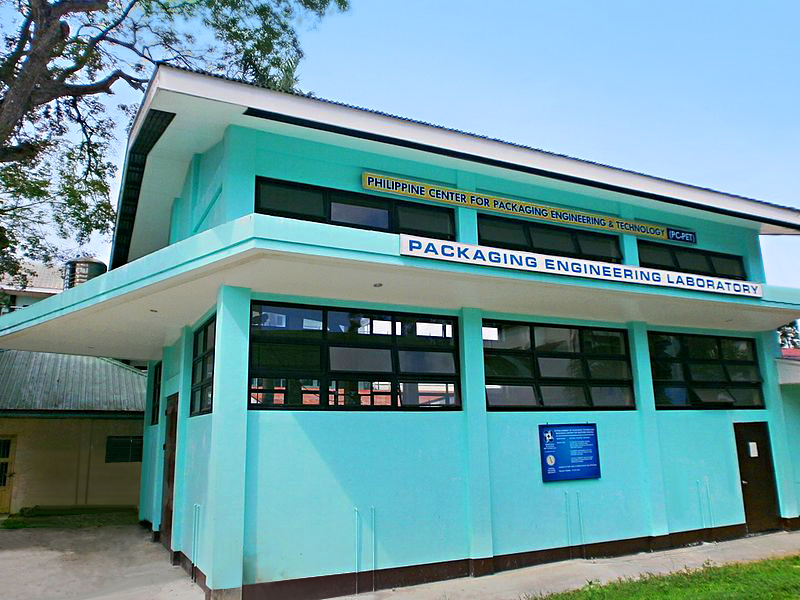
The CPU Philippine Center for Packaging Engineering and Technology (PC-PET) is the first of its kind in the South East Asian Region. The center is a combination of the College of Engineering's Packaging Engineering department and the facilities of the Packaging Testing Laboratory and the Packaging Technology Resource Center (PTRC). It is backed by the Department of Science and Technology and the Packaging Institute of the Philippines.

Originally the CPU Research Center lodged as an integral part of the CPU Outreach Center. In 1998, it was separated with the CPU Outreach Center. It was established to coordinate the research activities of the different colleges and units of the university and to convene and facilitate the affairs of the University Research Committee (URESCOM). Since its inception in 1998, CPU Research Center was able to enhance the competency of students, faculty and staff members in conducting research and in applying and disseminating information and findings for the benefit of its constituency and the community. The university's Institutional Research Program (IRP), through the CPU Research Center, which provides undergraduate and graduate students, faculty and staff with research opportunities for personal and intellectual growth yielded 119 bounded research reports, 53 ongoing institutional researches, and more than 100 faculty and staff were involved in research projects in 2005–2008, and still expanding to this day. The capability building programs that were regularly conducted increased faculty involvement in research. One major indication that the CPU Research Center and CPU links with the industry and business sector has grown stronger was the signing of a memorandum of agreement between the CPU Research Center (URC) and the Iloilo Chamber of Commerce in 2003. The agreement was about CPU Research Center's role as the sole consultant, researcher or trainer for the Iloilo Chamber of Commerce.

Under the CPU Research Center, the university published two research journals – the Scientia et Fides and Patubas and one research newsletter – the CPU Research Newsletter. The Scientia et Fides: Journal of Multidisciplinary Research and Review is the official journal of Higher Education Publication of the university and is internationally refereed and publishes semi-annually in print and online platform through the university's website. Patubas research journal is a refereed multidisciplinary research journal that aims to provide a source of information in the areas of agriculture, natural resources and the environment; social sciences, humanities and the arts; physical and biological sciences; business and management; engineering, information and communications technology; education; health, nursing and medical education; alternative medicine; theology and biblical studies; institutional system and process management; and community baseline impact studies. The objective of the journal is to help education professionals and decision-makers disseminate information and learn from each other's work.

Patubas is an Ilonggo word for "product" or "fruit", a fitting description for this multidisciplinary research journal which is indeed, a product or fruit of labors of researchers or the "seekers" of the truth in its varied dimensions. Patubas is published once a year under the auspices CPU Research Center.

In 2008, Rolex Award for Enterprise awarded the university alumni, professor, inventor and agricultural engineer Alexis Belonio due to his creation of a low-cost and environment friendly invention of the rice husk stove. Engr. Belonio is the first Filipino awardee of Rolex Award for Enterprise that has resulted the establishment of the Center for Rice Husk Energy Technology (CRHET) (Iloilo Rice Husk Center) at Central. The research center is attached to the College of Resources and Environmental Sciences and since it was established, it focuses on various technologies that will be developed and the utilization of rice husks as fuel and clean energy for cooking. The CPU Center for Rice Husk Energy Technology (CRHET) obtained funding from the Rolex Awards for Enterprise 2008.

Research and Extension Centers
CPU Appropriate Technology Center (CPU-APPROTECH)
CPU Affiliated Renewable Energy Center (CPU-AREC)
CPU Center for Local Governance and
Indigenous Peoples Studies (CPU-CLGIPS)
CPU Center for Mangroves and Marine Biodiversity Conservation (CPU-CMMBC)
CPU Center for Research, Technology Development
and Commercial Production of Philippine Native Chicken
(CPU-CRTDCPPNC)
CPU Center for Rice Husk Energy Technology (CPU-CRHET)
CPU Center for Teaching and Learning Excellence (CPU-CTLE)
CPU Crop Research Laboratory (Center)
CPU Philippine Center for Packaging Engineering and
Technology (CPU-PCPET)
CPU – Department of Science and Technology – PCIEERD
Wind Energy Research and Development Facility
CPU Research Center for Product Development (CPU-RCPD)
CPU Research Center (CPU-URC)
CPU Research and Developmental Learning Center
CPU Social Science Research Institute (CPU-SSRI)
DOST - CPUGAD Technology Business Incubator (CPUGAD TBI)
CPU World Bank Knowledge Development Center (CPU-World Bank KDC)

CPU is also the Department of Energy (Philippines) Affiliated Renewable Energy Center (CPU-AREC) for Western Visayas. The center is one of the most active among the 14 such in the whole Philippines and is funded by the Philippine Department of Energy and the university where it aims to provide research, extension, education for renewable energy with outreach programs and projects to electrify isolated and non-isolated places in Western Visayas region.

The university also has a Rockefeller Endowed Soils Analysis and Testing Laboratory. The university is also the sole Department of Science and Technology heat transfer facility for Western Visayas and collaborates since 2012 with De la Salle University in the fields of transportation and structural engineering research through the Central Philippine University College of Engineering.

Through the College of Engineering also, the CPU Philippine Center for Packaging Engineering (CPU PC-PET), a packaging testing center and laboratory facility which is the first of its kind in the Southeast Asian region was established in 2012, in which Central gain attention in the fields of science and technology and breakthrough for Packaging Engineering research and development in the country and South East Asia. The center is backed by the Department of Science and Technology, the Packaging Institute of the Philippines and a private sector's packaging advocate, Systemat-PackEDGE.

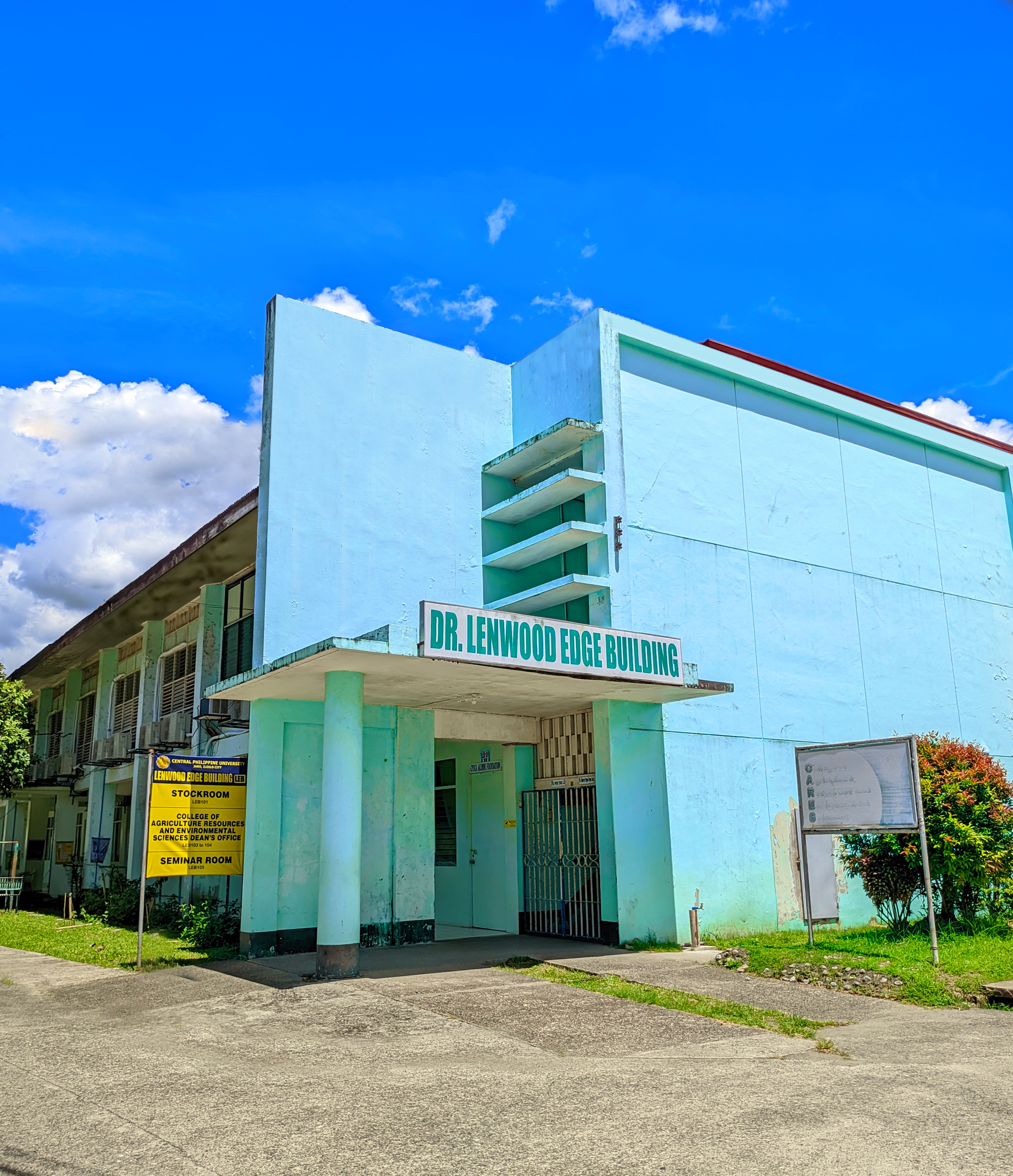
The Dr. Lenwood Edge Building of the College of Agriculture, Resources and Environmental Sciences. It has been designated by Commission on Higher Education (Philippines) as Center of Excellence in Agriculture and as Provincial Institute of Agriculture by the said agency under its National Agriculture and Fisheries Education System (CHED-NAFES). Research and extension centers under its hood include the CPU Appropriate Technology Center, CPU Center for Rice Husk Energy Technology (CPU-CRHET) and the CPU Center for Research, Technology Development and Commercial Production of Philippine Native Chicken (CPU – CRTDCPPNC) (the largest center for Philippine Native Chicken research in the Philippines).

As the Western Visayas region is the leading producer of Native Chickens in 2011 in the Philippines, the university's created a partnership with the Philippine Department of Agriculture along with its College of Agriculture, Resources and Environmental Sciences for the research and development of Philippine Native Chicken in the country through the establishment of the CPU Center for Research, Technology Development and Commercial Production of Philippine Native Chicken. The research facility or center is the largest research station for Philippine Native Chicken in the Philippines, it is located separately from the main campus and occupies the entire 7 hectare CPU Experimental Farm in the town of Leon, Iloilo. The center is facilitated by the Western Visayas Agriculture and Resources Research and Development Consortium (WESVARRDEC) and funded by the said government agency (Department of Agriculture) and the Philippine Council for Agriculture, Aquatic, Forestry and Natural Resources Research and Development (PCAARRD).

The endeavor of the research and development of the Philippine Native Chicken through the CPU-CARES Research Station for Philippine Native Chicken made Dr. Jaime Cabarles, the CPU College of Agriculture, Resources and Environmental Sciences dean and head of the research facility the 2014 Commission on Higher Education (Philippines) Republica Award National Winner in Natural Sciences and Agriculture category, due to his significant contribution as researcher (Research and Development of Philippine Native Chicken) to Natural Sciences and Agricultural research in the Philippine society.

Other research and auxiliary centers and extension programs of the university includes the CPU Center for Ideation, Realization and Commercialization (CPU CIRAC or CPU TechHub) which is now replaced by the CPUGAD Technology Business Incubator (CPUGAD TBI), a Department of Science and Technology backed technology business incubator center, CPU Research and Developmental Learning Center (Building), CPU Center for Local Governance and Indigenous Peoples Studies; CPU-World Bank Knowledge Development Center (CPU WB-KDC); CPU Appropriate Technology Center (CPU-APPROTECH); CPU Crop Research Laboratory; and the CPU – Social Science Research Institute.

On February 12, 2025, the university through a partnership with Department of Science and Technology (DOST) established the CPUGAD Technology Business Incubator (DOST-CPUGAD Technology Business Incubator), a business incubator hub supporting business startups and innovators who will expand and make their innovations a reality. CPUGAD Technology Business Incubator replaced the CPU-CIRAC or Center for Ideation, Realization, and Commercialization.

On September 15, 2025, the university through a partnership with the Iloilo Provincial Government, signed a memorandum of understanding which created the CPU Center for Mangroves and Marine Biodiversity Conservation. The university will adopt mangrove sites located in Sitio Panuso-on, Brgy. Nabitasan, Leganes, Brgy. Dangula-an, Anilao, and Brgy. Culasi in Ajuy, Iloilo. These sites will be utilized for instruction, research, and extension initiatives, with the primary goals of protecting the environment, conserving marine biodiversity, and ensuring food security for coastal communities.

== Cultures and traditions ==
=== Scientia et Fides ===
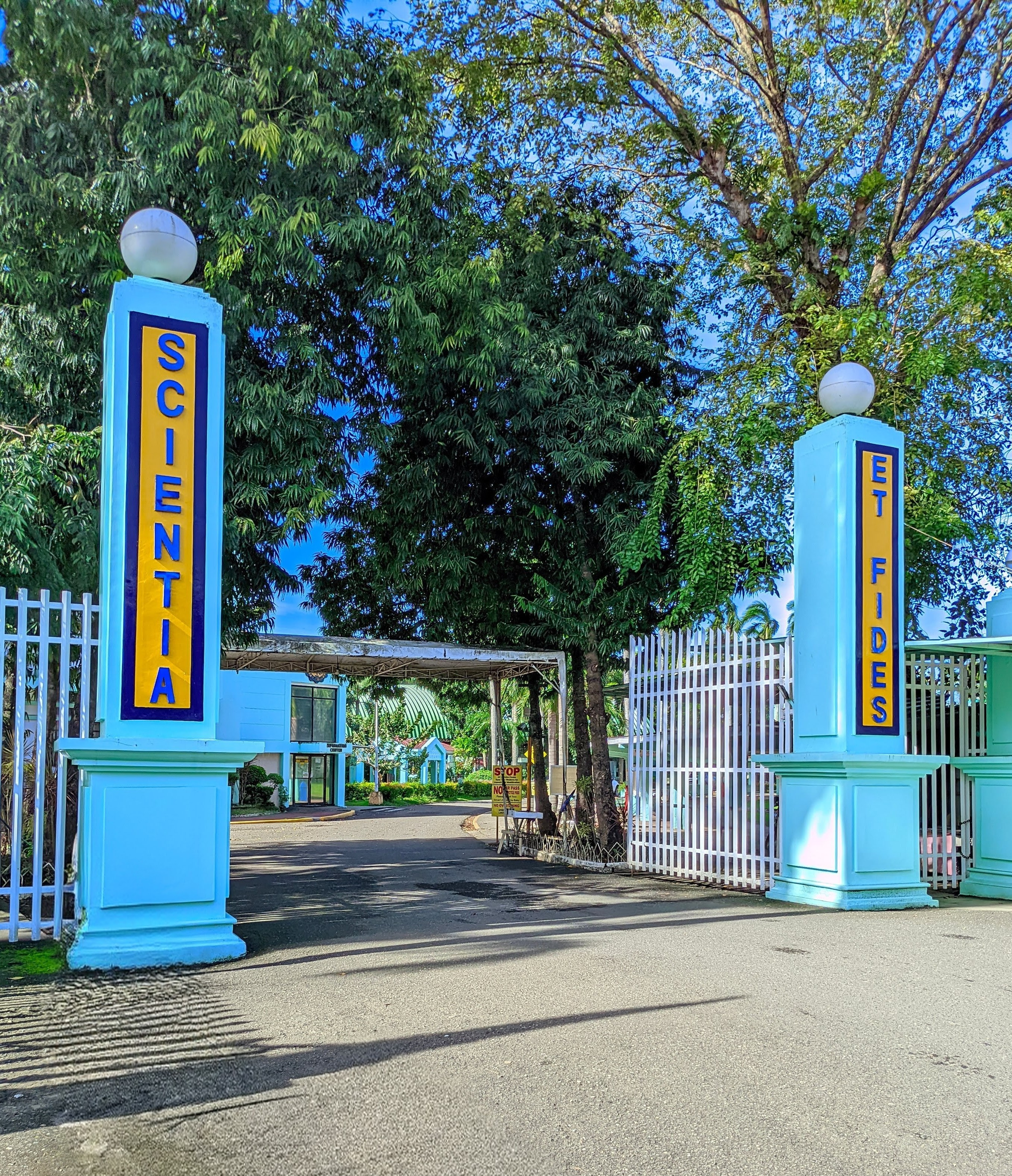
The Main Gate or second gate bears the university's Latin motto, "Scientia et Fides", which means Knowledge and Faith in English.

Central's motto, Scientia et Fides (Latin for “Knowledge and Faith”), was adopted under the leadership of its third president, American clergyman Dr. Francis Howard Rose. The motto is reflected in the university's logo and main gate (second gate). This motto reflects and reinforces the institution's Protestant Christian foundation, established by the American Baptist missionaries with its founding father, Rev. William Orison Valentine.

The term Scientia (“Knowledge”) signifies the pursuit of science and learning from a Christian perspective. It recognizes God as the creator and sustainer of all things. This view emphasizes that scientific inquiry helps individuals understand and appreciate God's creation while using its potential for the benefit of humanity.

The term Fides (“Faith”) refers to faith as a gift that finds purpose within God's sovereign plan. This faith is active and transformative. It continually seeks understanding and manifests in actions aimed at glorifying God and inspiring positive change.

=== Central Spirit ===
The term "Central Spirit" refers to the friendship, unity, and shared identity among students, alumni, and faculty of Central Philippine University. Often seen as a type of social glue, it represents the collective memories of school days, campus life, and traditions that symbolize the lasting bond among Centralians. While it differs from the original missionary vision that formed the foundation of the university over a century ago, Central Spirit reflects the changing culture of the institution. A song called Central Spirit, composed by former university president Dr. Francis H. Rose, reinforces this cultural identity and serves as a symbolic expression of the Centralian community.

=== Central, My Central ===
“Central, my Central,” the Alma Mater song of Central, was written by Rev. Dr. Homobono Aguiling, the first Filipino pastor of the Central Philippine College Church. He was also one of the first Filipino college instructors at the school in the 1920s. The song is played during convocations, academic events, and commencement ceremonies at the university.

=== Gold and Blue ===
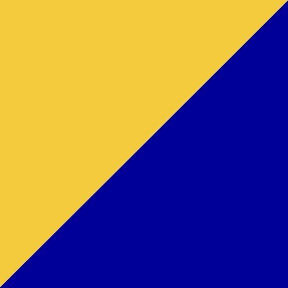
Gold and Blue, the official and traditional colors of Central.

Gold and blue are both official and athletic colors of Central since it became a Junior College in the early 1920s. Gold regards to its "Scientia" motto as "Excellence" and contrast to the Biblical standpoint along with blue for "Spirituality" (from its "Fides" motto) when chosen as the official colors of Central in the 1920s. Both reference Biblical texts from the books and chapters of 1 Corinthians 3:12–13 and Ephesians 2:20 (for gold) and Numbers 4:6–7, 9,11, 12; 15:38–40 and Exodus 25:4; 26:1, 31, 36; 28:28, 31 (for blue).

=== CPU Derecho ===
The CPU Derecho, specifically the "Jaro CPU" and "Jaro CPU Ungka UI" jeepney routes, has provided a transportation link between Iloilo City Proper and the Central Philippine University campus for many years. These routes have been part of the university's identity since its early years and reflect its cultural presence in the city. More than just a way to travel, the CPU Derecho shows the university's active role in the community. It symbolizes how the university is part of the daily life in Jaro and the broader Iloilo area.

=== Central Compass ===
Central Compass, officially known as the Centralian Compass, is an annual orientation event at Central Philippine University. This tradition welcomes and guides freshmen and new college students during the first week of classes in the fall semester.

The event offers a structured tour of the university's main campus. It helps students get familiar with the layout, services, and heritage of the institution. Participants visit major campus landmarks, including the Administration Building, Henry Luce III Library, CPU Church, Johnson Hall, Weston Hall, Stuart Hall, Roblee Science Hall, Franklin Hall, Loreto D. Tupaz Hall, and various academic colleges and student facilities.

Besides the physical orientation, Central Compass introduces students to CPU's Christian foundation, values, and history. The program usually features interactive sessions, briefings from faculty and student leaders, and activities that encourage campus engagement and community building.

Central Compass plays a vital role in supporting students as they transition into university life. It is regarded as one of the key traditions of the institution and helps shape the Centralian identity among new enrollees.

=== Festival of Lights and Music at Central ===
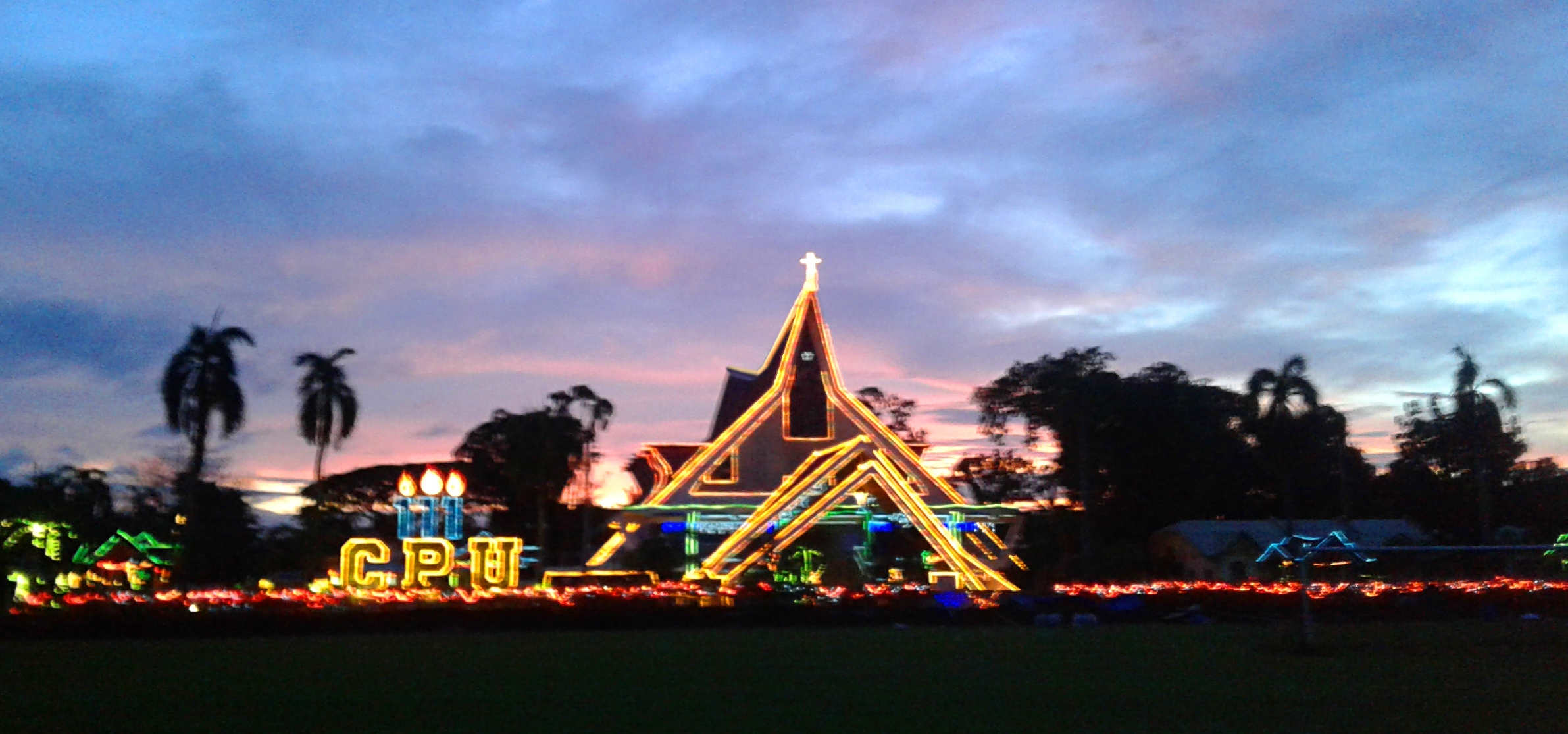
The Festival of Lights and Music at Central 2016 with the CPU Church in the background.

The Festival of Lights and Music at Central is a month-long Christmas celebration that Central Philippine University has held every year since 1998. It is a major holiday attraction in Iloilo City and has been a tradition for Centralian families for more than a decade. The festival usually kicks off in the first week of December and attracts large crowds, especially on opening night. This night includes a Christmas variety show with performances from university dance groups and colleges, a fireworks display, and music from the CPU Symphonic Band.

The festival runs until the Feast of the Epiphany on January 6. During this time, the university's main streets, trees, and buildings are decorated with beautiful Christmas lights. Events include a Christmas cantata at the CPU Church performed by different chorale groups. There are also Christmas-themed musicals, "battle of the bands" competitions, and other performances held at places like the Big Field and the CPU Alumni Promenade and Concert Park. The celebration features Kantahan sa CPU, a Christmas singing contest open to both university members and the local community.

=== The Marker Water Tradition ===
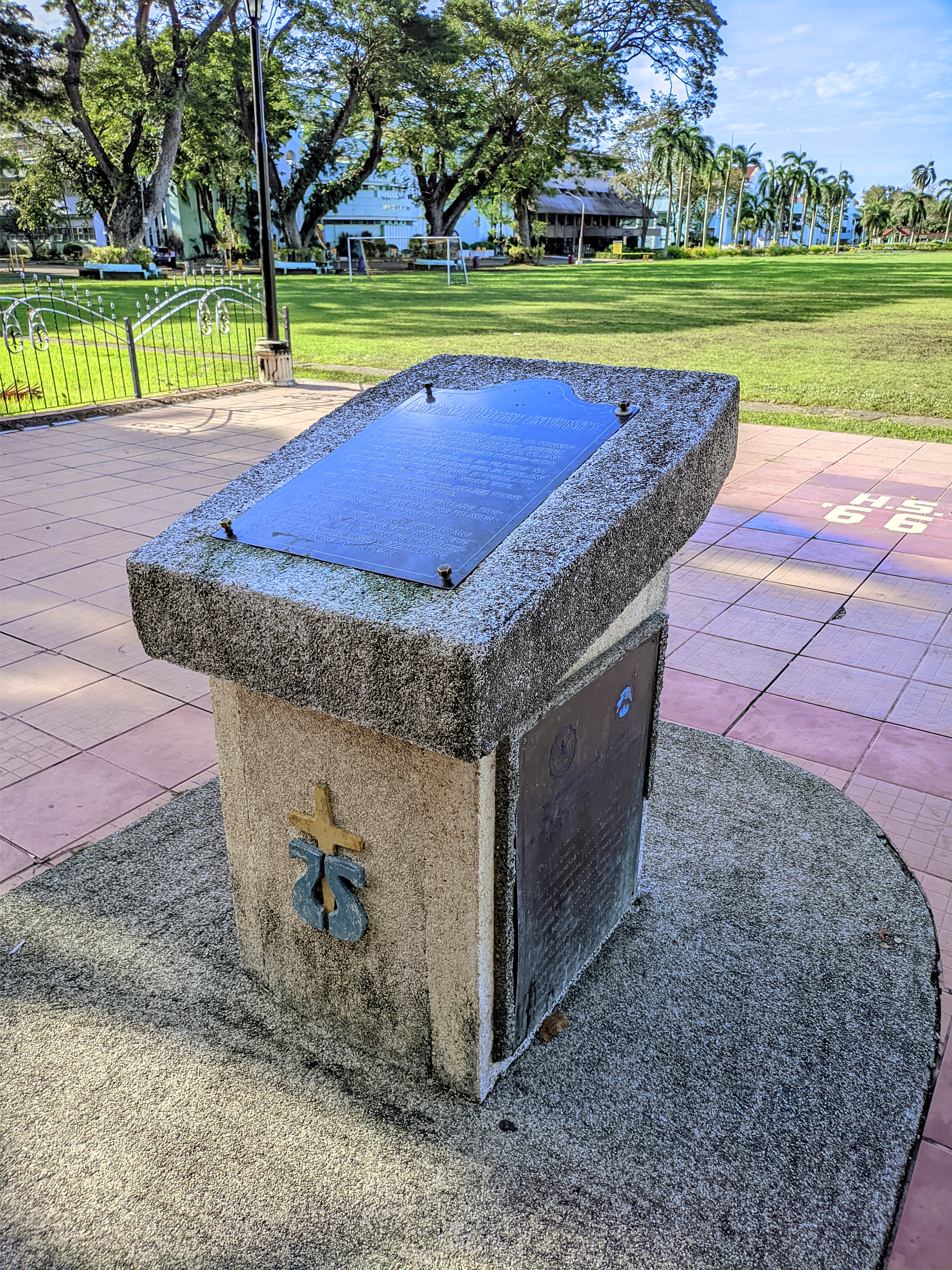
The Marker Water Tradition is a tradition for new students held at the Heritage Marker at the Centennial Walkway.

The Marker Water Tradition is a well-known campus custom and informal rite of passage for freshmen and new students at Central Philippine University (CPU). The practice centers on the National Historical Institute (NHI) marker located along the university's Centennial Walkway. As a lighthearted initiation, upperclassmen playfully trick incoming students into believing that the sound of running or dripping water can be heard from inside the historical plaque.

To hear it, the freshmen are told to press their ears flat against the metal while lightly tapping the surface. This creates a distinct acoustic echo that actually sounds remarkably like fluid moving inside, convincing the unsuspecting students that the story is true. While the tradition is ultimately a harmless campus prank, it serves as a practical introduction to the university's historical landmarks. By gathering at the walkway, newcomers are active participants in a shared joke that has been passed down through generations of Centralians. Over the decades, this playful deception has cemented itself as a staple of CPU student life, welcoming new classes into the university culture through shared humor and campus lore.

=== Hopevale ===
Hopevale honors the martyrdom of eleven American Baptist missionaries and three children in December 1943 during World War II. This event is an important part of Central Philippine University's culture and tradition. The missionaries included Francis Howard Rose, his wife Gertrude Rose, Prof. James Howard Covell, Charma Moore Covell, Rev. Erle Frederick Rounds, Ruth Violet Meyer, Louise Cummings Rounds, Jennie Clare Adams, Dorothy Antoinette Dowell, Signe Amelia Erickson, and Dr. Frederick Willer Meyer. They were executed by Japanese forces after hiding for months in a remote mountain refuge they called “Hopevale” in Katipunan, Tapaz, Capiz. CPU keeps their legacy alive with annual memorial services, pilgrimages to the Hopevale site, and artistic presentations like the Hopevale Musicale. On campus, their memory is honored with a memorial marker, the rebuilt “Cathedral in the Glen” chapel located between the Henry Luce III Library and the Rose Memorial Auditorium, and the auditorium itself, named after Reverend Doctor Francis Howard Rose. This auditorium is one of the largest venues in Western Visayas and serves as a lasting tribute to the martyrs’ faith and sacrifice.

=== Christ Emphasis Week ===
Christ Emphasis Week is a week-long religious observance that takes place twice a year at Central Philippine University. This celebration occurs once every semester and is an important part of CPU's culture and campus life. It includes worship services, fellowship gatherings, live gospel music from gospel bands, Praise Jam sessions, and other activities focused on faith.

=== University Week Centralian Fest ===
In 2015, the University Day celebration, which had been held in August for many years, was moved and combined with Foundation Day which is also held every October 1. In 2025, to align the combined celebrations, it has been named as University Week Central Fest (UWCF). This event starts in September and continues into the first week of October. The celebration includes intramural games between colleges and schools, which begin in September. It also features the popular Mr. and Ms. CPU pageant, a university picnic, foot parade, and concerts at the Promenade (Alumni Promenade and Concert Park). The last days of the celebration lead up to Foundation Day, which is held every October 1. On this day, the university remembers its founding by American missionaries, starting as a Bible School and Jaro Industrial School, the two forerunner schools of Central in 1905. The event includes a civic parade, a memorial service for the founding father of Central, William Orison Valentine, and his co-founders. The traditional singing of the Star Spangled Banner takes place, along with the raising of the flags of the United States and the Philippines.

=== Nursing Pinning, Capping and Candle Lighting ceremonies ===
The Nursing Capping and Candle Lighting Ceremony is a special tradition started by the College of Nursing. This tradition was later adopted by other nursing schools in the Philippines. It dates back to the college's founding in 1906 as the Union Mission Hospital Training School for Nurses, which was the first nursing school in the country. The ceremony takes place at the end of the junior year for nursing students at the Rose Memorial Auditorium. During this event, students wear their CPU—Iloilo Mission Hospital nursing uniforms, light candles, and receive a nursing cap.

The Pinning Ceremony, on the other hand, occurs before graduation for nursing students. During this ceremony, the graduating student nurses receive a Centralian Nurse Pin. This pin represents the completion of their training and signifies that they are ready to begin their careers as professional nurses. The Directors of Nursing Services from various affiliated hospitals, including the university's hospital, CPU-Iloilo Mission Hospital, along with college faculty, present the pin.

== Athletics ==
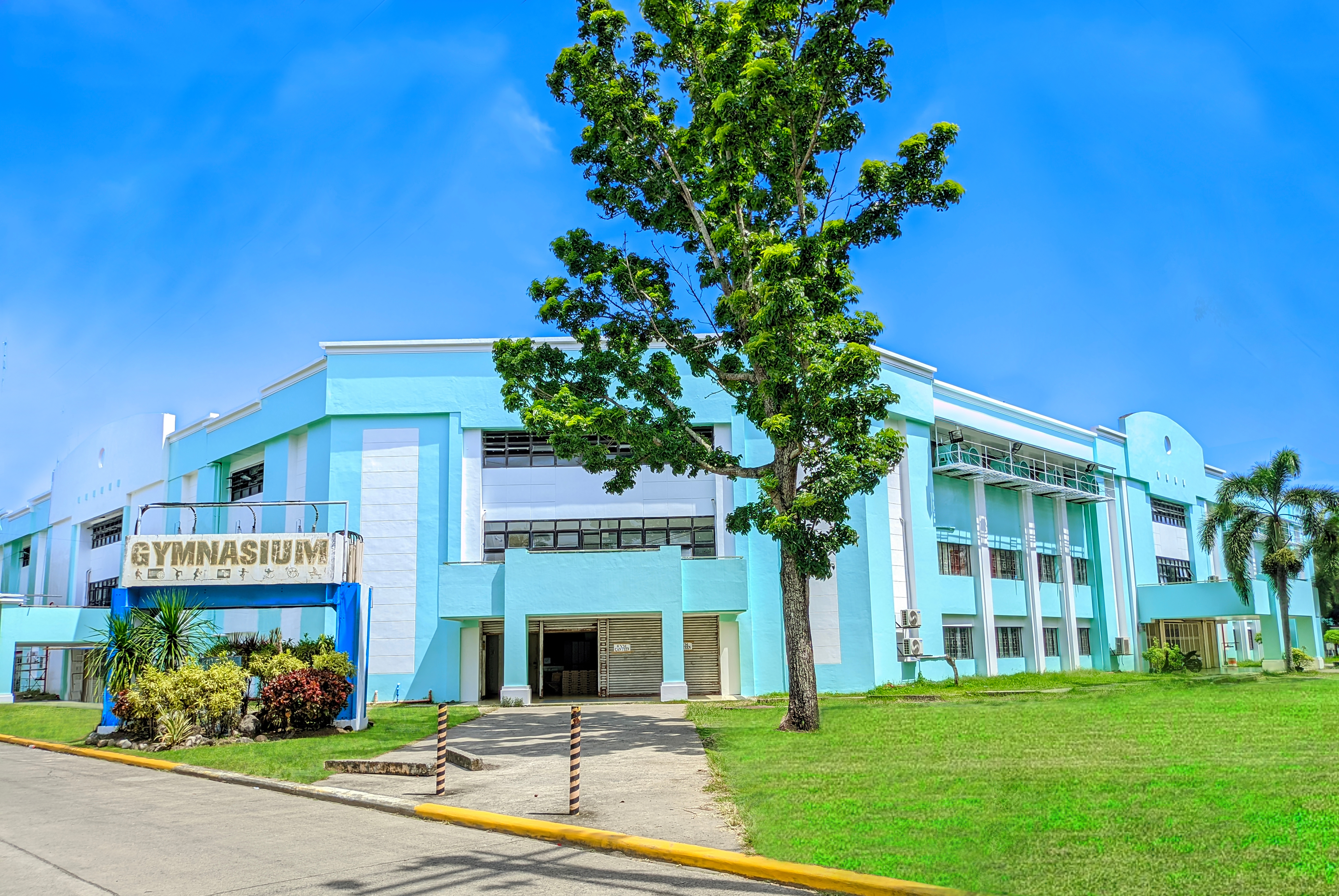
The CPU Gymnasium is home to the CPU Golden Lions, the varsity team of Central Philippine University. It is the largest university gymnasium in Western Visayas.

Central is member of the Private Schools Athletic Association (PRISAA) and the Philippine University Games (UniGames). The university's athletic nickname, Golden Lions represents the university in athletic games.

The Golden Lions which was adopted as the varsity teams monicker through a proposal by the Reverend Francis Neil G. Jalando-on, Coach of the College Table Tennis Teams and Associate Pastor of the University Church, is based on the following Bible verses in contrast as the university was founded by the American Baptist missionaries: (Proverbs 28:1) "The godly are as bold as lions", (Proverbs 30:30) "The lion, mighty among beasts, does not retreat from anyone", (2 Samuel) 17:10 "The bravest are those whose heart is like the heart of a lion", (Revelation 5:5) "The Lion of the tribe of Judah, the Root of David, has triumphed" — JESUS is the Lion of Judah.

Central has adequate playgrounds and facilities for sports and athletic activities.

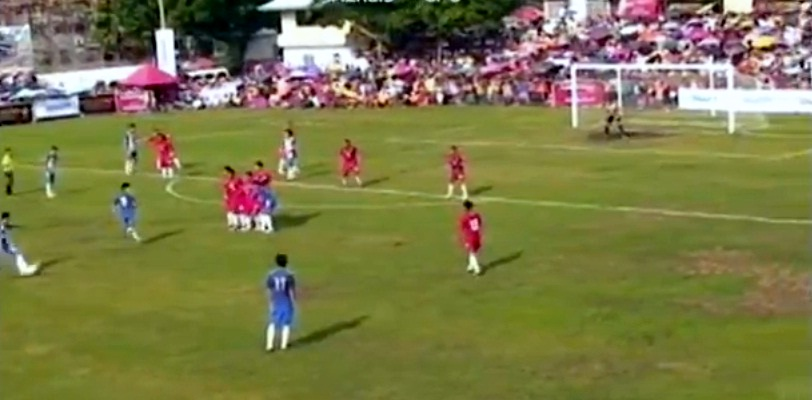
CPU International Football Team vs. Philippine Football Federation (AZKALS) Friendly match in 2010 held in Barotac Nuevo, Iloilo.

The CPU Gymnasium (Central Philippine University Gymnasium) is the largest university and athletic gymnasium in Western Visayas and can serve as a venue for the following sports: basketball, sepak takraw, badminton, table tennis, lawn tennis, and volleyball. CPU Gymnasium has also can host musical, live and band concerts. The CPU Gymnasium been the official home of the official athletics team of Central and is called The Lion's Den, the CPU Golden Lions. Outdoor sports such as soccer and softball can be played at the football grounds, CPU Softball Field and the ground situated at the Half-moon Drive.

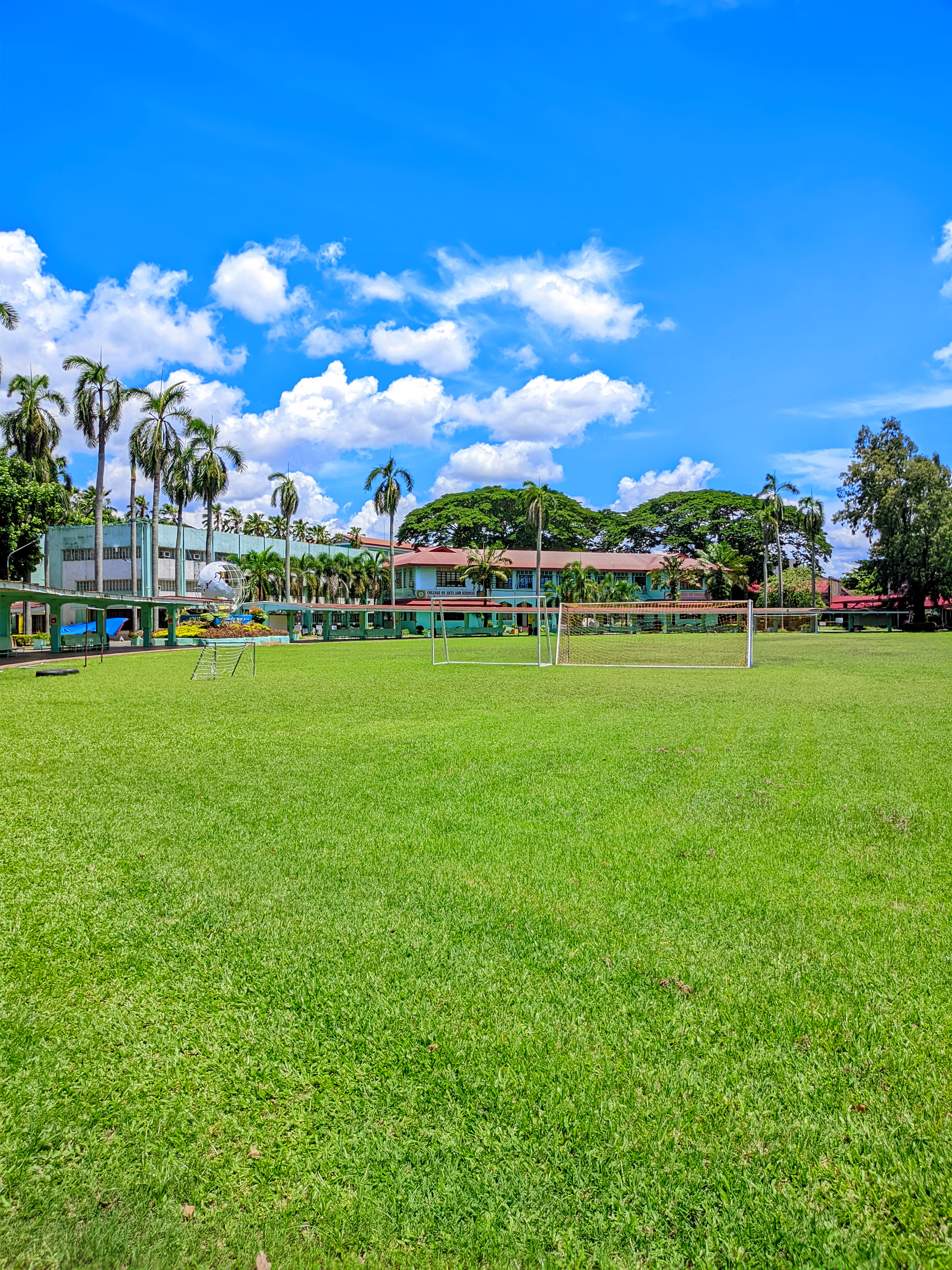
The CPU Halfmoon Football Field.

The university hosted the 14th Philippine University Games (UniGames). There is also an Olympic size CPU swimming pool for swimming competitions. The university main campus can accommodate Triathlon sports event. The University Tennis Courts is also available for use by students and tennis enthusiasts. CPU's Olympic-sized swimming pool is the most modern and biggest school-based pool in Western Visayas. It provides a very convenient swimming poll for PE students, athletes, alumni and friends of CPU. Central Philippine University is famed for its football games.

The CPU International Football Team, composed of foreign students who are studying at Central played against the Philippine Football Federation team (Azkals) in 2010 in Barotac Nuevo, Iloilo. Most football players of Central are under the roster of Stallion F.C., a club that plays for the United Football League (UFL) and is also affiliated with Iloilo F.A. (IFA). CPU also hosted the PFF Smart Club Championship-Group B on August 9–13, 2011 which was facilitated by Iloilo Football Association wherein the university is one of the hosts venue.

In April 2012, the Western Visayas (PRISAA) Private Schools Athletic Association – Softball team, composed wholly and represented by Central's Softball team, defeated the regional teams including the last contingent (Region 10) and wins second time since 2011 with the gold medal in the 59th National PRISAA Championship. The 59th National PRISAA was held in Cebu City in 2012.

== Student life ==
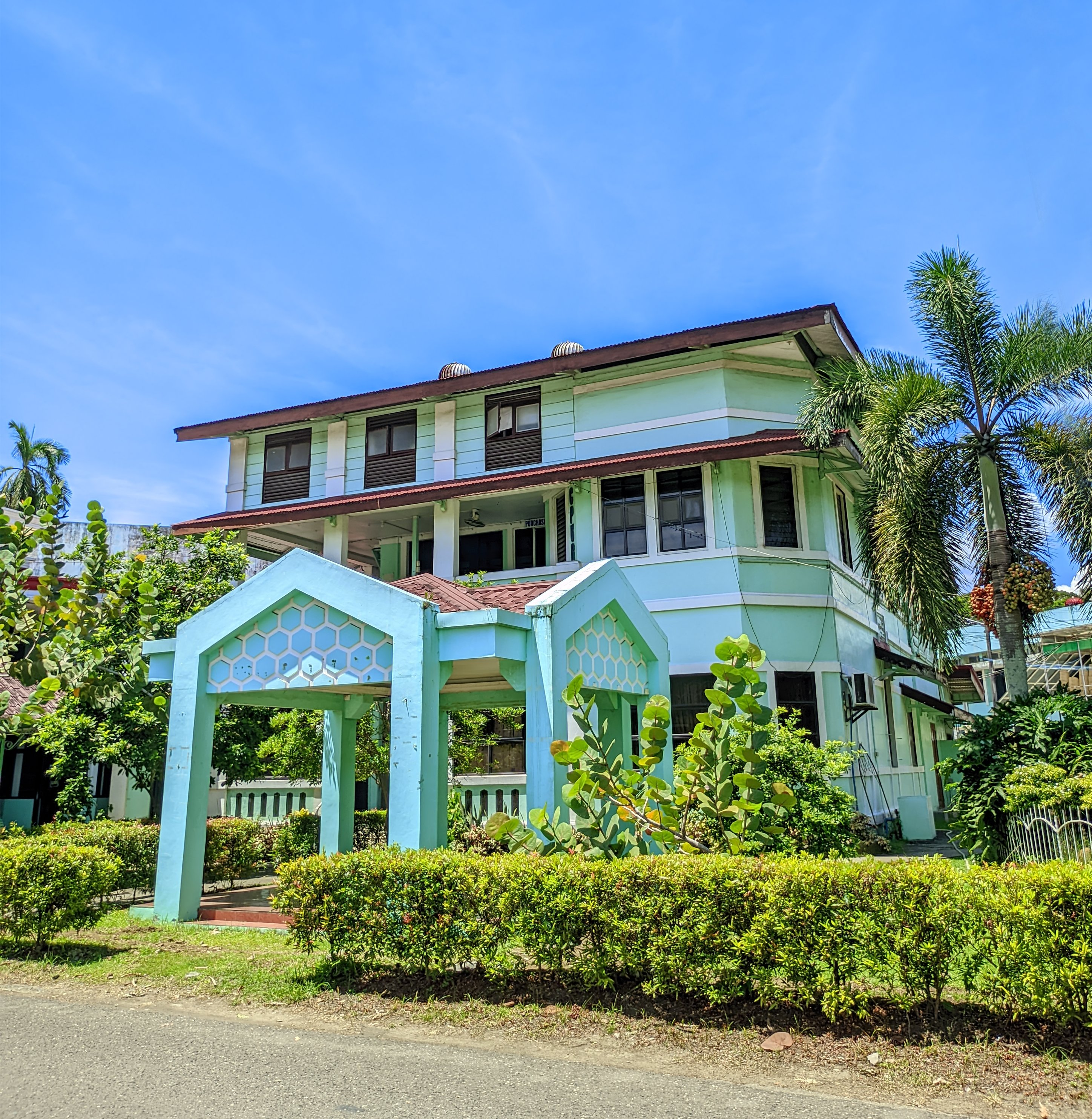
The Stuart Hall, named after the late President of the university, Harland F. Stuart, houses the Student Service Enterprise at the ground floor and the CPU Republic in the top floor.

=== Student organizations ===
Students are encouraged to form groups that enhance their desire for study. The Student Organization Committee (SOC) acts as the regulatory body for all student campus organizations. It approves the registration and supervises the activities of student campus organizations. These include religious and cultural groups, academic and athletic clubs and groups. Notable organizations are: Central Philippine University Republic (CPU Republic), official student governing body of the university (the first student government in the Philippines); CPU Parliamentarian Society; the Central Echo; CPU Bahandi Singers; CPU Handbell Choir (the first and only 5-octave handbell choir in the country); and CPU Mountaineering Society. There is also a Foreign Students' Organization that assists the university to invite more foreign students to attend Central.

=== Fraternities and sororities ===
There are more than 10 fraternities and six sororities that are local, international or founded in the university that maintains their chapters at Central, as well as fraternity for those who are taking a Juris Doctor (J.D.) course, the Order of Kalantiao, and Phi Beta Epsilon for the students of the College of Engineering.

=== Student and faculty housing ===
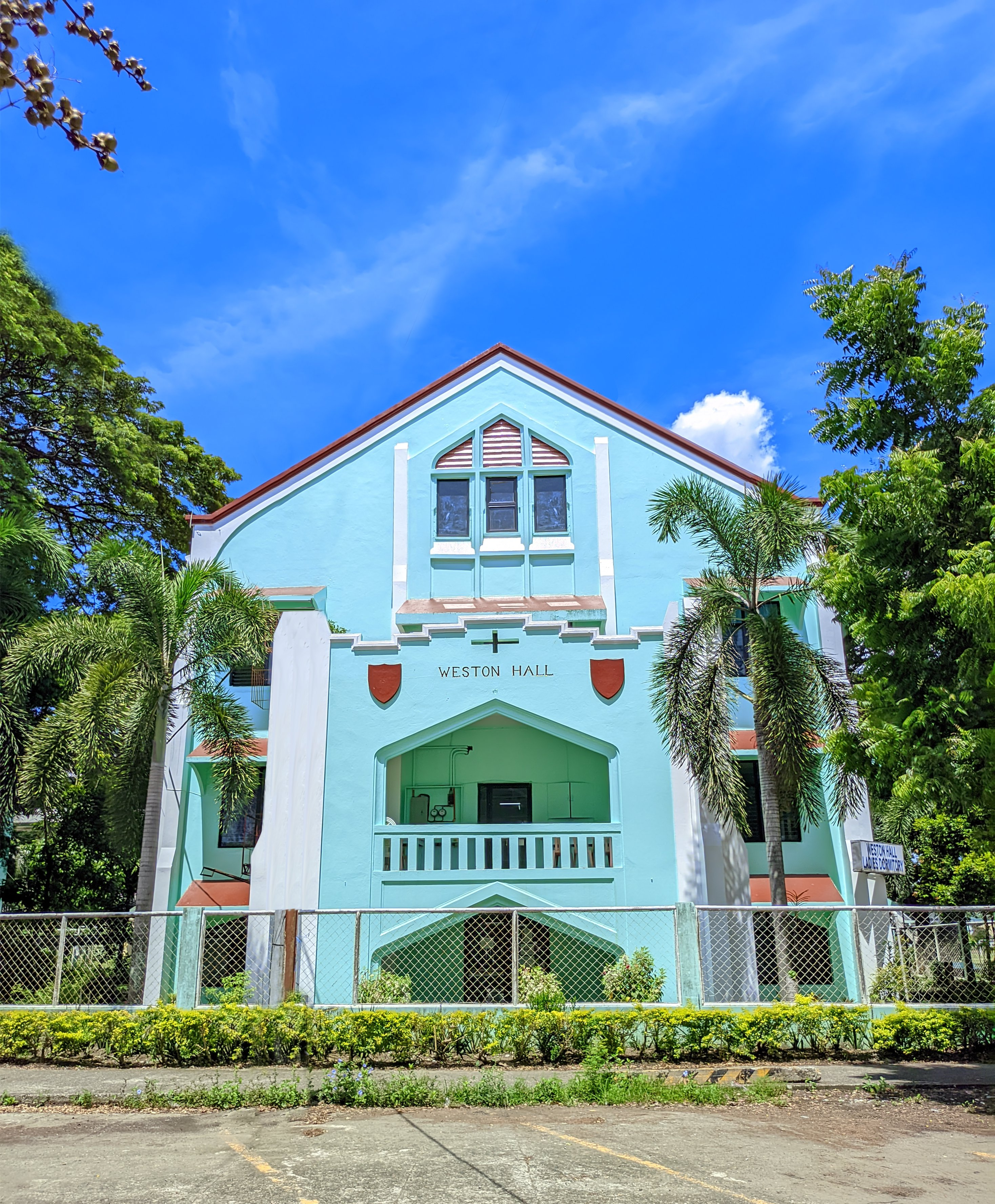
Weston Hall (Women's Dormitory).

Various apartment facilities, such as dormitories and housing commons, are located on the university's main campus that could provide living accommodations to students. The Franklin Hall (men's dormitory) and Weston Hall (women's dormitory) are the two known residential commons that can accommodate a total capacity of 300–400 students. The Anna V. Johnson Hall (Johnson Hall), a former edifice which houses the College of Theology, is now a residential commons exclusively for the students of the said seminary. Other residential halls for Central students include the Roselund Hall (Roselund Hostel), the Gonzaga Hall (Gonzaga Mansion), the Executive House, and the Missionary Hall. The Missionary Hall is the latest addition to the university's expansion of building residential commons on the main campus to cater its growing number of students.

The American Village, a residential village located within the premises of the university's campus, has also renovated halls and housing units catering to the growing demand of foreign students who are studying at Central. The village has also residential units for the university faculty and staff.

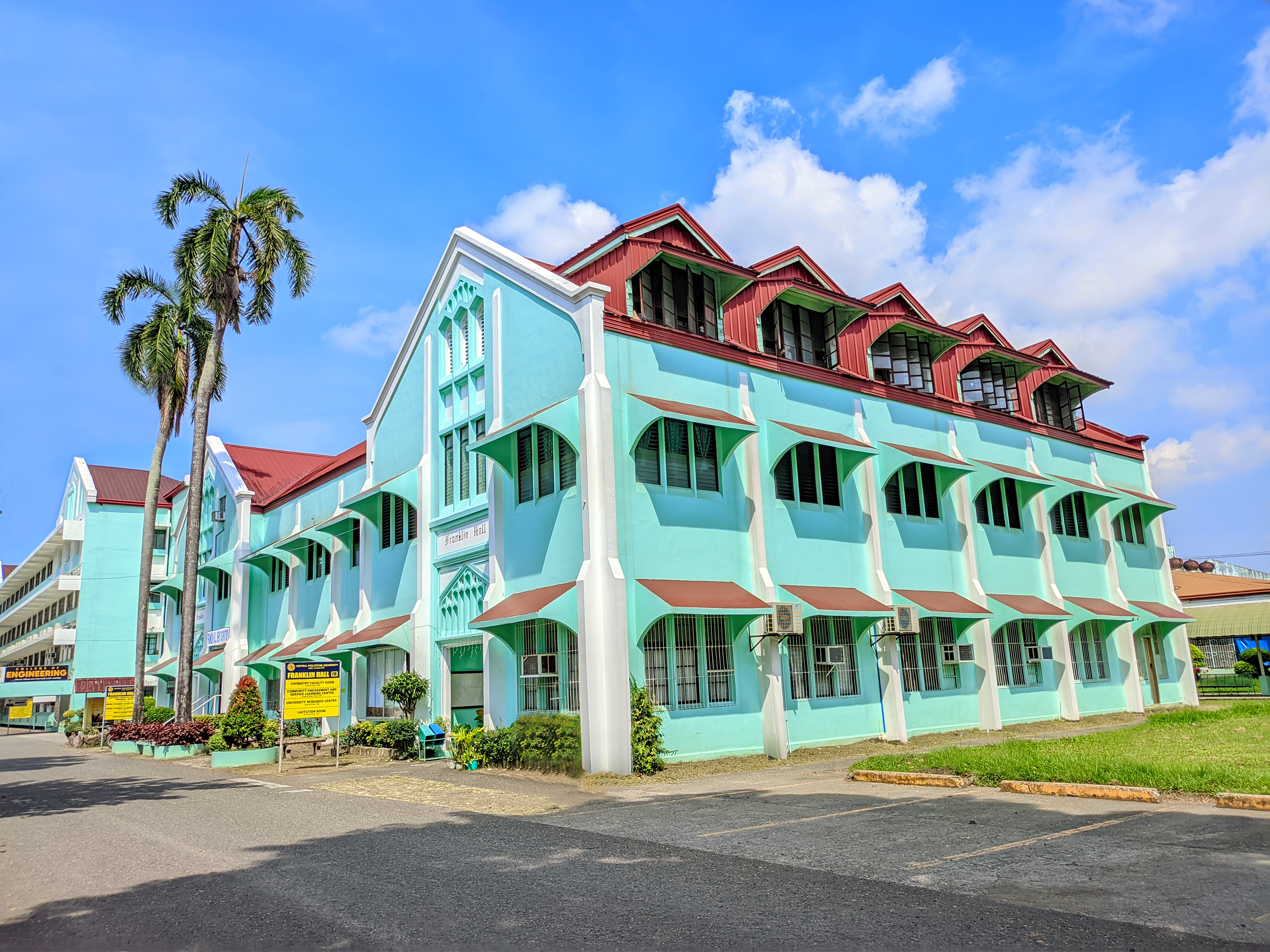
Franklin Hall (a male residence dormitory.)

There's also two residential villages located separately from the university's main campus in Jaro – The CPU Centennial Village, a 2.9-hectare (7.2-acre) residential village for the university's faculty and staff members has 185 saleable units with 6 types of housing models; and the CPU FA Heritage Ville Subdivision/CPU Heritage Subdivision, another residential subdivision of the university located few kilometers away east of the CPU Centennial Village in Anilao, Pavia, Iloilo, which just like the latter, also provides residential housing units with community amenities for the faculty and administrative staff of the university.

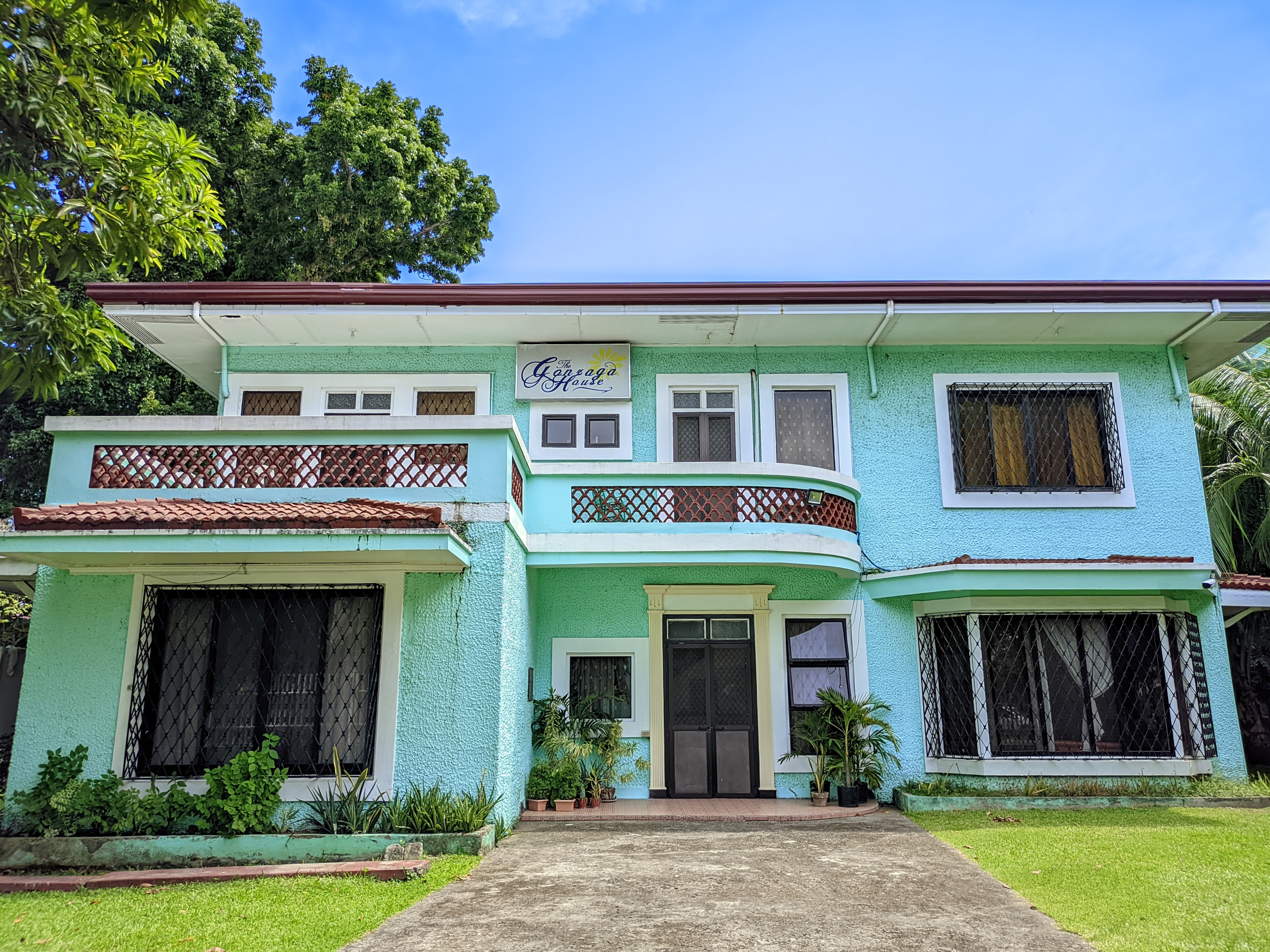
The Gonzaga House.

Living in the dormitories and villages is considered a privilege that is granted to the students and faculties who comply with the rules and regulations of the university. Formal admission procedures is followed before admitting anyone to the dormitories. For university villages, the housing units are given by the university to the faculty members and staff.

=== Publications ===
The Central Echo (CE) is the official student publication of CPU. It was founded in 1910, five years after Jaro Industrial School opened. Established originally as The Hoe, The Central Echo evolved to be one of the best college student publications in the Western Visayas region: It has been recognized as Second Best Magazine and Fifth Best Newspaper by the Philippine Information Agency-Region 6 in 2009. Central Echo publishes and circulates newspaper twice in a regular semester, it publishes magazine also, an art portfolio (Paraw) and a summer literary folio every summer. Other publications of the university include The Centralite, the official yearbook; The Central Post, the official publication of the office of the university president; and the Central High Echo, the official publication of the High School Department.

Every college in the university has its own publication. Some of the student writers are associate members of the Iloilo Press Club and the College Editors Guild of the Philippines.

== Notable alumni ==
People associated or affiliated such as students, faculty members, administrators, honorary degree holders, or other people with Central are called Centralians. The university maintains an alumni association with various chapters throughout the country and abroad.

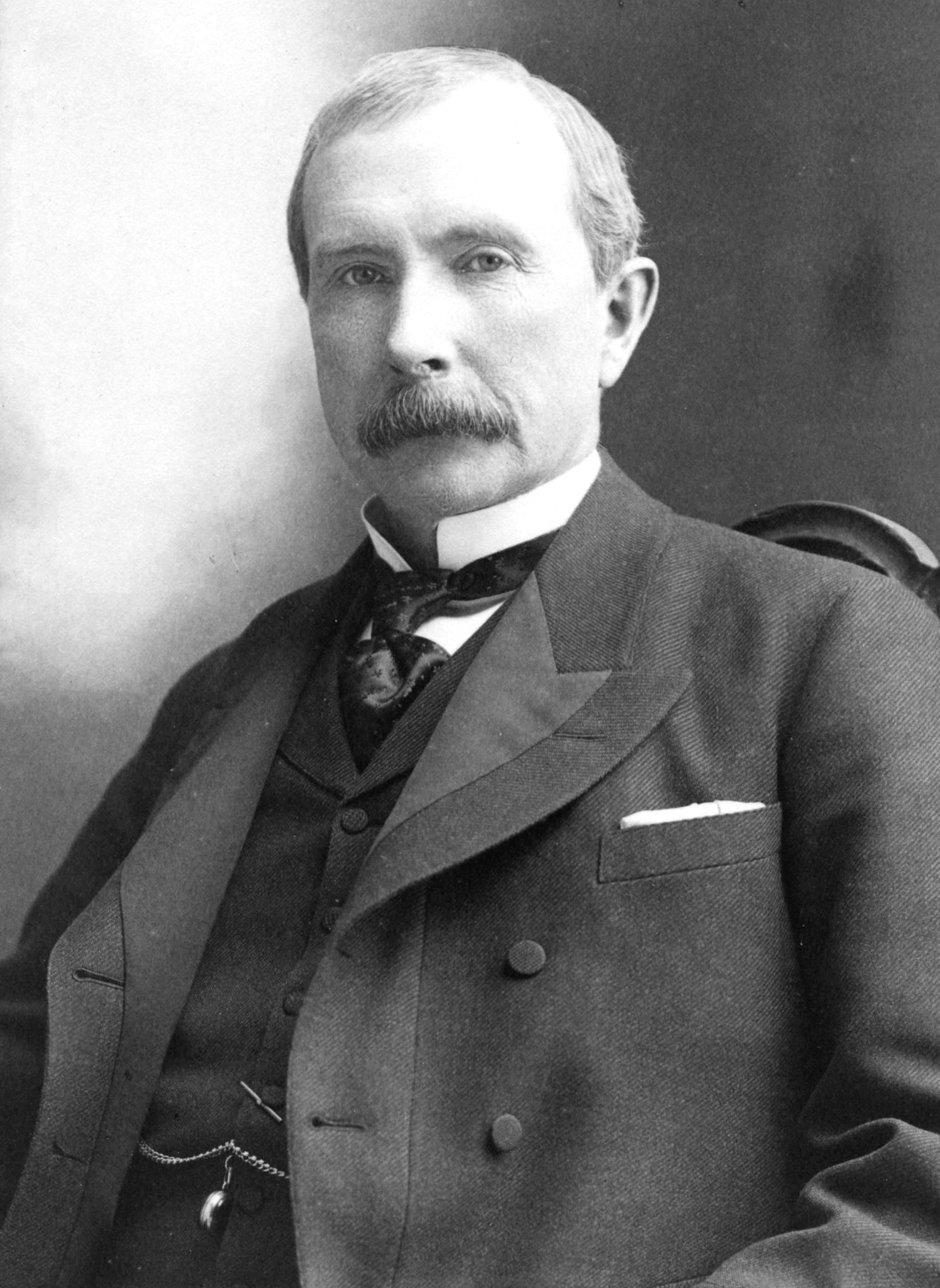
John D. Rockefeller, American industrialist, philanthropist, and main benefactor of Central. He is widely considered as the richest man in the history of the United States.

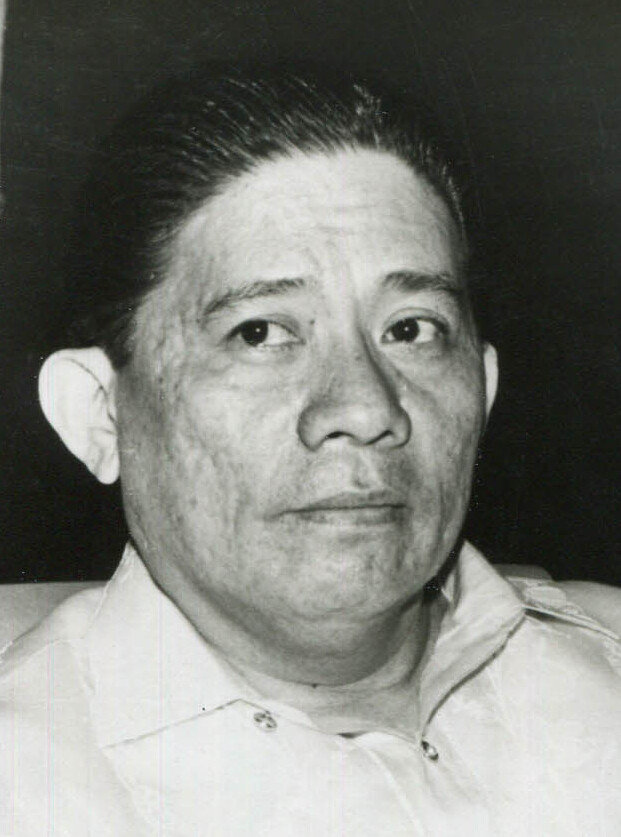
Rodolfo "Roding" Ganzon, first popularly elected Mayor of Iloilo City and Senator of the Philippines.

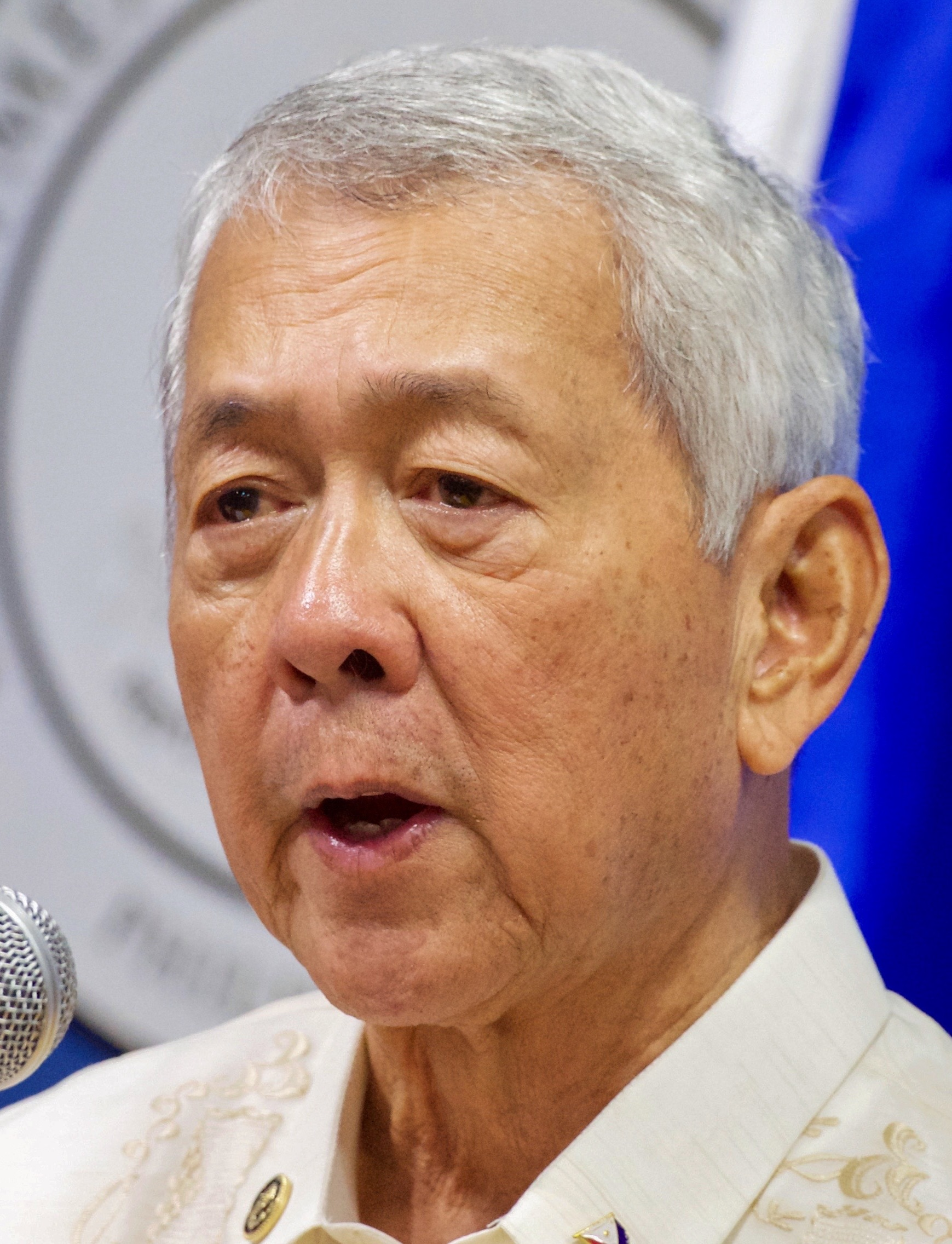
Perfecto Yasay Jr., Secretary of Foreign Affairs of the Philippines and 2010 Philippine elections vice-presidential bet.

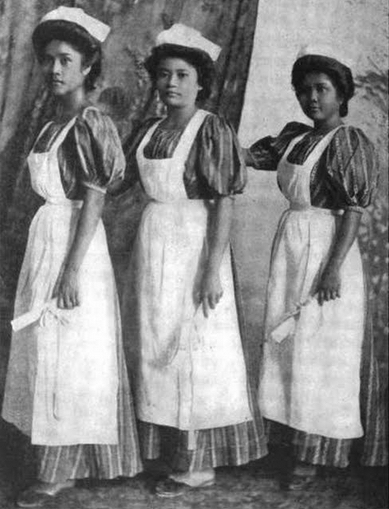
Nicasia Cada, Felipa de la Peña, and Dorotea Caldito, the first graduate nurses of the Philippines.

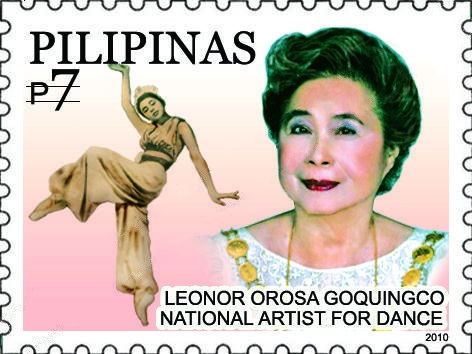
Leonor Orosa-Goquingco, National Artist of the Philippines for Dance.

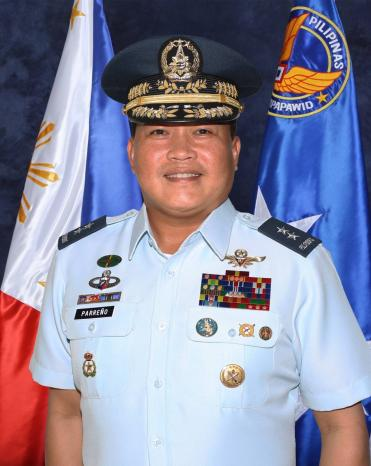
Major General Stephen P. Parreño, Commanding General of the Philippine Air Force under President Bongbong Marcos

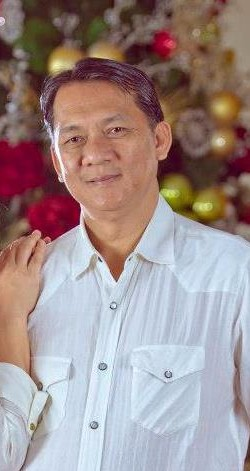
Felix Tiu, Chinese-Filipino hotel and resort business magnate. Founder of EON Group of Companies, developer of EON Hotels and Resorts and Waterworld Cebu and Iloilo.

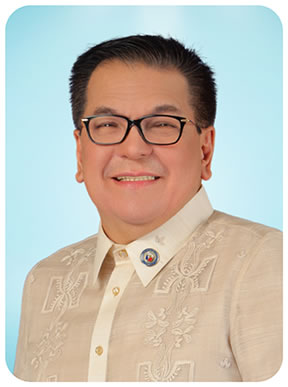
Ferjenel Biron, Iloilo fourth district congressman and author of the cheaper medicines bill.

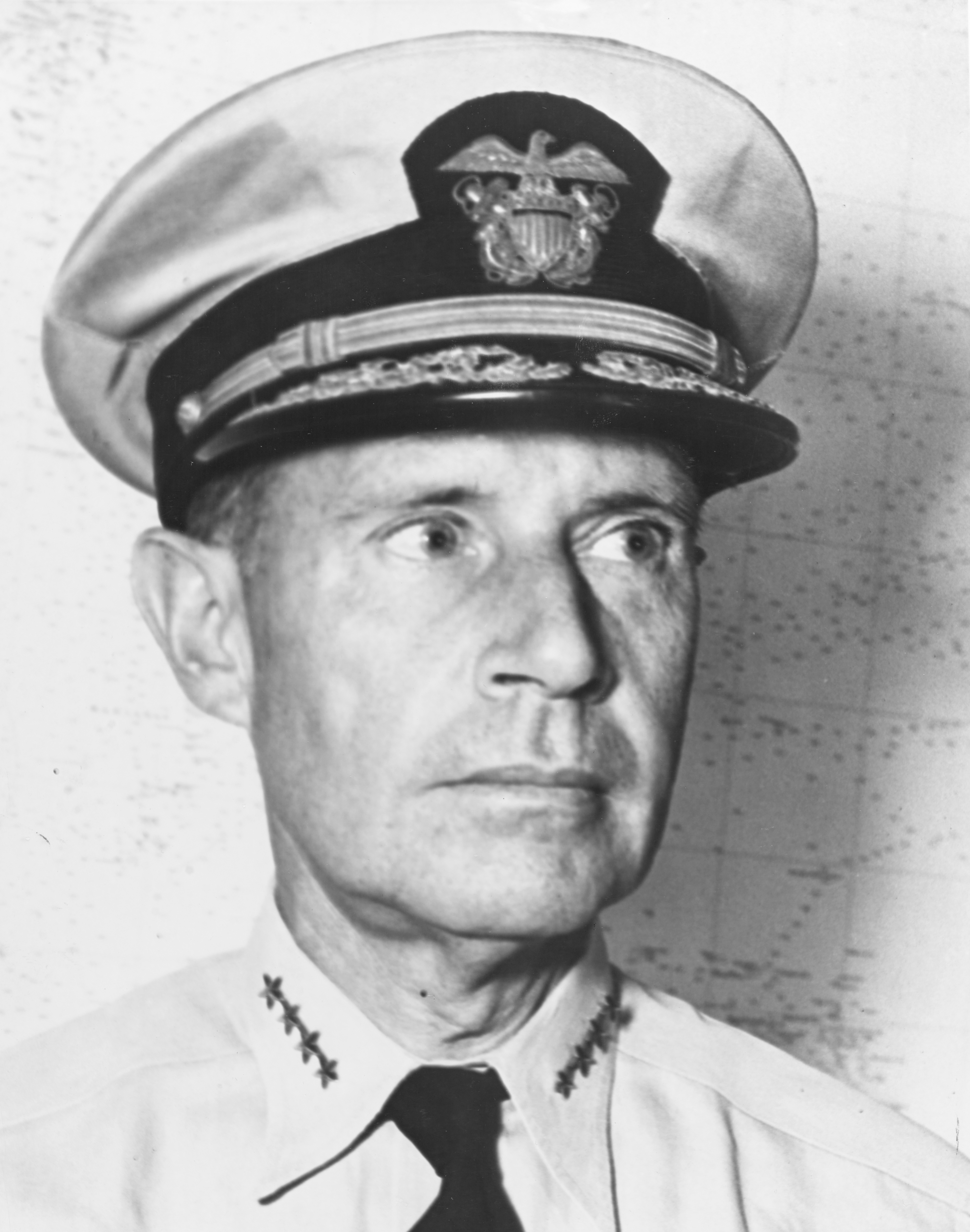
Raymond A. Spruance, United States navy admiral and American ambassador to the Philippines.

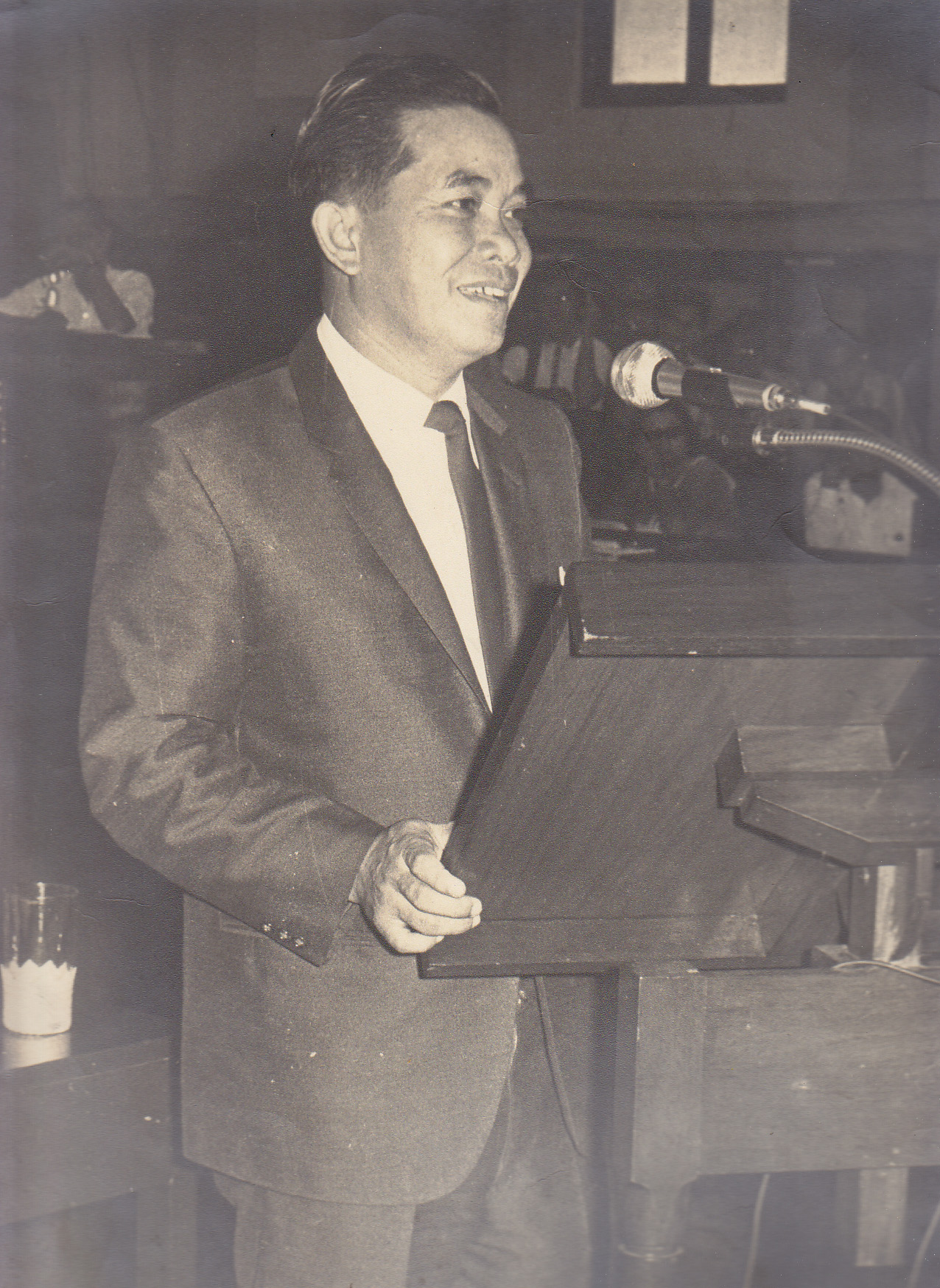
Jovito Salonga, Filipino statesman and lawyer and 14th President of the Senate of the Philippines.

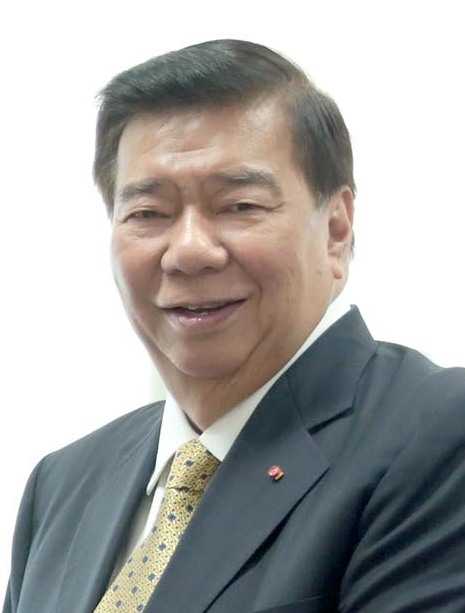
Franklin Drilon, Filipino politician (senator) and Senate President of the Senate of the Philippines.

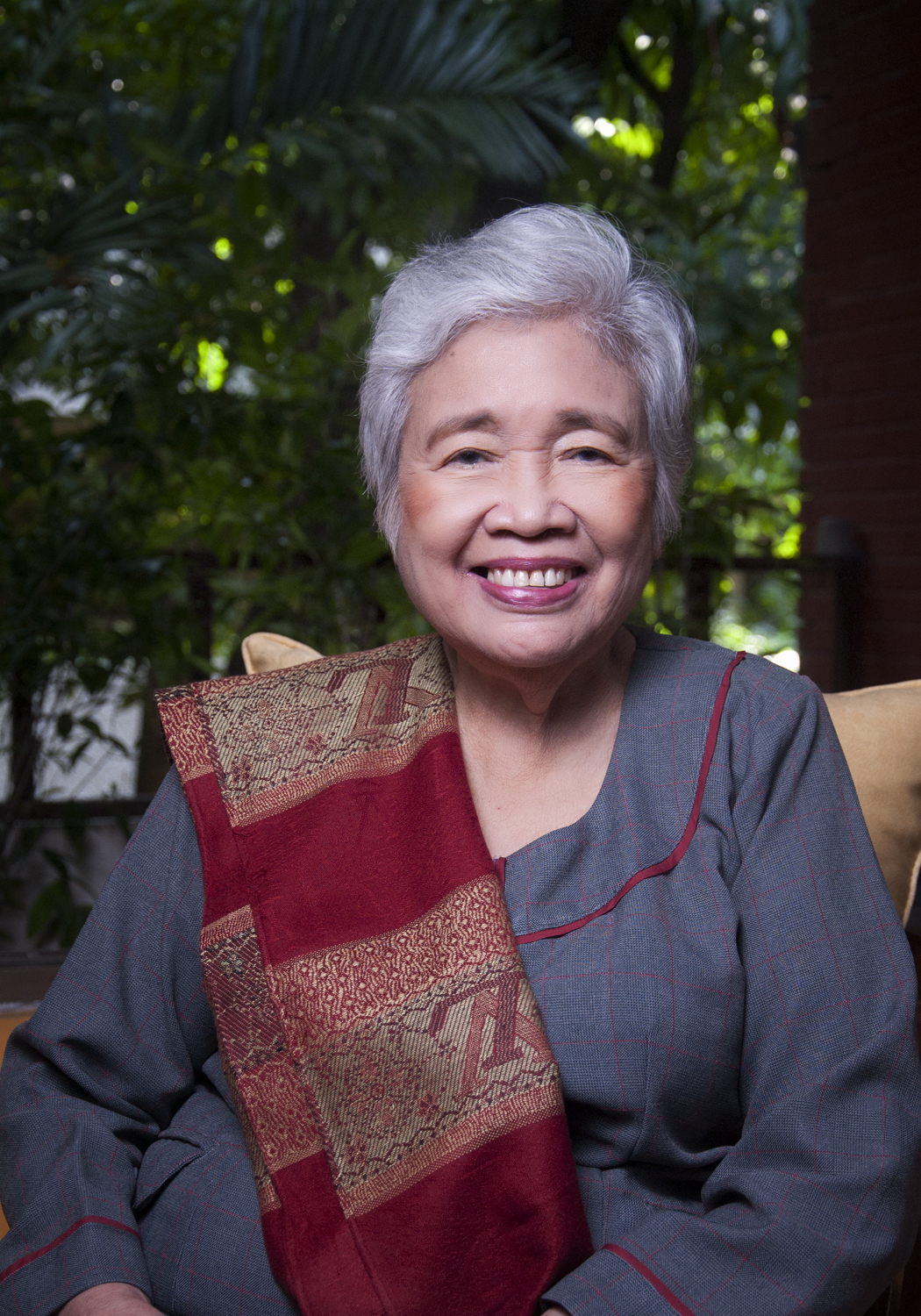
Leonor Briones, Secretary of the Department of Education of the Republic of the Philippines under President Rodrigo Duterte.

Central has produced or is associated with notable people as its alumni who became distinguished in their respective fields. This includes Ferdinand Marcos (the 10th President of the Philippines), Rodolfo Ganzon (the first popularly elected Mayor of Iloilo City and former Philippine Senator) Jovito Salonga (Filipino Senator), Franklin Drilon (Filipino Senator who also served as the President of the Senate of the Philippines), and Claro M. Recto (former Filipino Senator).

Legal luminaries in the national Philippine judiciary include Calixto Zaldivar (former Associate Justice of the Supreme Court of the Philippines, Congressman, Governor of Antique province and executive secretary of the President of the Philippines), Renato C. Dacudao (Associate Justice of the Court of Appeals of the Philippines), Lily V. Biton (Associate Justice of the Court of Appeals of the Philippines), and Reynato Puno (22nd Chief Justice of the Supreme Court of the Philippines).

In the field of business and industry, John D. Rockefeller (main benefactor of Central Philippine University and American business magnate and philanthropist widely considered as the richest person in US history and the richest person in modern history), Lucio C. Tan (Chinese-Filipino business tycoon), Alfonso A. Uy (Chinese-Filipino businessman, former and first President of Federation of Filipino Chinese Chambers of Commerce & Industry from the Visayas and Mindanao, and recipient and awardee of the Dr. Jose Rizal Award for Excellence in Business and Commerce), Felix Tiu (Chinese-Filipino hotel and resorts business magnate), and Jose Mari Chan (a Chinese-Filipino singer, songwriter, businessman, and TV presenter. He is a renowned balladeer and composer, known as the "King of Philippine Christmas Carols"), are included as alumni of Central.

Distinguished alumni as presidential cabinet members or secretaries of national government agencies include Perfecto R. Yasay, Jr. (Foreign Affairs Secretary of the Philippines; SEC chairman of the Philippines, 1995–2000; and 2010 Philippine vice-presidential candidate), Leonor Briones (National Treasurer and Secretary of the Department of Education (Philippines) under the administration of Philippine President Rodrigo Duterte), Gregorio Licaros (fourth Governor of the Central Bank of the Philippines from 1970 to 1981), Rene Cartera Villa (former acting chairman of Local Water Utilities Administration of the Philippines), Nielex Tupas (public servant, politician and Chief Operating Officer and executive director of the National Youth Commission of the Philippines)), Peter Irving C. Corvera (Department of the Interior and Local Government (DILG) – Philippines Undersecretary for Public Safety and Presidential Medal of Merit (Philippines) awardee), Hansel Didulo (Assistant Secretary of the Department of Agriculture (Philippines)), Edward Dy Buco (Deputy Commissioner of the Bureau of Customs (Philippines)), Hope Hervilla (Assistant Secretary of the Department of Social Welfare and Development), and Rex Estoperez (Spokesperson for the National Food Authority).

In the national legislation and local governance, it includes Estrellita B. Suansing (Nueva Ecija 1st District congresswoman), Arthur Defensor, Sr. (Governor of Iloilo province), Ferjenel Biron (former Congressman of Iloilo's Fourth District and author of the cheaper medicines bill), Pablo Nava III (Congressman (Append Partylist)), Hernan Biron, Jr. (Iloilo fourth district), Richard Garin Jr. (Iloilo first district congressman and former Vice-governor of Iloilo Province), Daisy Avance-Fuentes (former assemblywoman and present Governor of South Cotabato), Salvacion Z. Perez (former congresswoman candidate and Governor of Antique Province), Edgar T. Espinosa Jr. (Congressman representing the province of Guimaras), Horacio Palma Suansing (Sultan Kudarat 2nd District congressman), Conrado Norada (Governor of Iloilo Province), Ramon Duremdes (Vice Governor of Iloilo Province), Christine Garin (Vice Governor of Iloilo Province), Joshua Alim (Iloilo City councilor and 2019 Philippine Elections Iloilo City congressman political bettor), Jed Patrick Locsin Escalante-Mabilog (former mayor of Iloilo City and World Mayor Award finalist from the Philippines), and Jerry P. Treñas (former congressman and mayor of Iloilo City).

Notable alumni in foreign service as diplomats include Leo Tito Ausan Jr. (Philippine Ambassador to Bangladesh, Sri Lanka and the Maldives, Assistant Secretary for Legal Affairs of the Department of Foreign Affairs (Philippines), and former Philippine Consul General to Germany and Saudi Arabia) and Enrique Zaldivar (former congressman and Philippine Ambassador to Brunei).

The university's presence in the academia, science and technology, and renowned award giving institutions such as Ramon Magsaysay Award (Asian Nobel Prize), is widely known with its alumni as laureates, fellow or awardees. It includes Jose V. Aguilar (the first Filipino recipient of the Ramon Magsaysay Award (Asian equivalent of Nobel Prize) and also first awardee of the said award (Ramon Magsaysay Award) for Government Service category for his work as the "Father of the Community School Movement". He served also as a consultant on Elementary education and later to the UNESCO Consultative Mission to the Philippines), Gilopez Kabayao (Ramon Magsaysay Award laureate (Asian equivalent of Nobel Prize), renowned musician (international violin virtuoso), and patriarch and member of the musical family, The Kabayaos in the Philippines), Alexis Belonio (Filipino inventor, engineer, scientist and the first Filipino Rolex Award for Enterprise awardee. He was included also by the Rolex watchmaking company on its list of 10 model innovators in November 2008. He is also one of the first seven modern day Filipino heroes awardees and recipient of the first ever Yahoo! Philippines Pitong Pinoy Awards in 2011 and part of the 25 Heroes for Better during the 25th anniversary of the Western Union Philippines), Felipe Landa Jocano (historian and dubbed as the first and foremost Filipino Anthropologist), and John Elmer Loretizo (inventor and 2017 grand winner of National Geographic's "Everyday Genius").

Fulbright scholars and professors-in-residence includes Betty Triño Polido (Nursing educator and Fulbright scholar), Edwin Helwig (Fulbright professor (1950–1951)), Robert Jelliffe (Fulbright professor (1950–1951)), Earl Glenn (Fulbright professor (1952–1953)), Morris Fender (Fulbright professor (1959–1960)), Howard Sengbusch (Fulbright professor (1962–1963)), Irving Boekelheide (Fulbright professor (1964–1965)), Robert Hopkins (Fulbright professor (1966–1967)), Deforest Palmited (Fulbright professor (1967–1968)), and Chester Hunt (Fulbright professor (1975–1976)).

Alumni as National Artists of the Philippines includes Ramon Muzones (Hiligaynon fictionist and writer. 2018 National Artist of the Philippines for Literature awardee (first Hiligaynon writer awarded as National Artist for Literature)) and Leonor Orosa-Goquingco (National Artist of the Philippines for Dance, Mother of Philippine Theater Dance and Dean of Filipino Performing Arts Critics. She was the first Filipina and the only dancer sent on the first-ever cultural mission to Japan (1939) and the first Philippine folkloric ballerina or ballet dancer).

Prominent Centralians in military service include Major General Stephen P. Parreño (Commanding General of the Philippine Air Force under President Bongbong Marcos); Alexander Pama (retired Vice-Admiral of the Philippine Navy and Undersecretary of the National Disaster Risk Reduction and Management Council (NDRRMC) of the Philippines), Hector Tarrazona (former colonel of the Philippine Air Force, founding member of the Reform the Armed Forces Movement, 2010 senatorial candidate under Ang Kapatiran Party, and consultant/chief of the Airmen Examination Board at the Civil Aviation Authority of the Philippines), Ezra James Enriquez (former Chief of Staff of the United Nations Disengagement Observer Force (UNDOF) during the Golan Heights standoff in Middle East), Custodio Parcon Jr. (Philippine Navy Lieutenant Colonel and one of less than 20 graduates of the Philippine Military Academy to have awarded the prestigious Philippine Medal of Valor by the President of the Philippines), Elvegia Ruiz Mendoza ("first female General in the Armed Forces of the Philippines" and Florence Nightingale Awardee from the International Red Cross), and Ramona Palabrica-Go (United Nations Consul General and the first female General in the Philippine Army. Other than such position and distinction that she held, Go was also the first female military pilot, first female line officer, and the first female battalion commander in the Philippines).

In literature, journalism, and media, Danny Fajardo (the president and founder of the Philippine leading newspaper Panay News), Rosendo Mejica (renowned Ilonggo and Visayan journalist, educator, and labor leader who is considered as the Dean of Visayan Journalists and also established the longest Ilonggo existing newspaper in 1913, the Hiligaynon), Benigno Hinolan (writer of the first biography article of the Philippine national hero, Graciano López Jaena in 1923), Almatita Tayo (writer and Carlos Palanca Memorial Award for Literature awardee), and Cherry Palma (news anchor-woman of TV Patrol Panay, a regional news show of ABS-CBN), are esteemed alumni of Central.

In pageantry, Louise Aurelio Vail (first Binibining Pilipinas winner to place as a semi-finalist (top 15) in the Miss Universe pageant in 1965. She is also included in the magic five of the said pageant (Miss Universe) in the said year also (1965)), and Maria Daziella Gange (Filipina beauty pageant, second winner of the Miss Filipinas Heritage and the second representative of the Philippines to the international pageant search Miss Heritage. She is also hailed as the first winner of the Miss Filipinas Heritage who came from Visayas and Mindanao), both hailed as graduates of Central.

In the field of performing arts and entertainment, it includes Alienette Coldfire (Katchry Jewel Golbin) (third-place winner of the 11th season of La France a un incroyable talent (France's Got Talent)), Otoniel Gonzaga (internationally known music virtuoso and tenor singer), JM Bales (singer behind the hit-song "Magandang Dilag" and Tawag ng Tanghalan sa It's Showtime contestant), and Kaki Ramirez (Filipino actor).

Alumni as trailblazers in the medical and allied and health sciences include Phebe L. Pendon (first Filipino fellow of the American Association of Cardiovascular and Pulmonary Rehabilitation), Loreto D. Tupaz (considered as the pioneer and pillar of the nursing profession in the Philippines and hailed as the Florence Nightingale of the Philippines), Nicasia Cada (one of the first three graduate nurses of the Philippines who graduated in 1909), Dorotea Caldito (one of the first three graduate nurses of the Philippines who graduated in 1909), and Felipa De la Pena (Gumabong) (one of the first three nursing graduates of the country from Union Mission Hospital Training School for Nurses, now Central Philippine University College of Nursing, the first and oldest nursing school in the Philippines),

Prominent figures in sports and athletics include Jovelyn Gonzaga (Filipina volleyball athlete, member athlete and team captain of Philippines women's national volleyball team who played during the 2015 Southeast Asian Games in Singapore and Philippine Army Lady Troopers as an opposite hitter. She was named in 2013 as the Shakey's V-League Open Conference Most Valuable Player).

Other known Central alumni that created significance in various fields include Juan C. Orendain (first press secretary of Manuel Roxas, President of the Philippines), Lejo Braña (first Filipino Certified Professional in Packaging and the first Filipino and Asian to receive a prestigious award in the packaging community in the United States and worldwide in his election to the US Packaging Hall of Fame), Isabelo de los Reyes Jr. (Honoris Causa; fourth Supreme Bishop of the Philippine Independent Church, known as the "Father of Ecumenism in the Philippines"), and Pedro E.Y. Rio (the first Filipino Doctor of Education degree holder).

== Notes and references ==
=== Notes ===
a. The Baptist Training School was established in June 1905 while the Jaro Industrial School for boys was established on October 1, 1905. The Jaro Industrial School for boys later became a junior college in 1923 and was renamed Central Philippine College, and in 1924, the Baptist Training School merged and became part of the Central Philippine College. In April 1953, Central Philippine College attained university status and became Central Philippine University.

b. Excluding the main campus which is 24 hectares (59 acres), the university has a total combined external land area of 171.13 hectares (422.87 acres). It includes the CPU Hopevale Agricultural Extension Land (95.8 hectares), CPU Zarraga Farm and Research Campus (19.3 hectares), CPU Leon Experimental Farm and Research Campus (7 hectares), CPU Centennial Village (2.9 hectares), the CPU–Iloilo Mission Hospital (3 hectares), CPU-FA (Faculty Association) Heritage Ville Subdivision (4.7) San Rafael Land (24 hectares), and Guimaras Land (14 hectares), and CPU Fortress College in Kabankalan City, Negros Occidental (0.43 hectares).

=== Further reading ===
- Nelson, Linnea, A.; Herradura, Elma (1981), Scientia et Fides: The Story of Central Philippine University, Central Philippine University
- Valentine, Ina Van Allen, An Oral History, (Recorded in 1969 and printed by Alpine Vista Press, Longmont, Colorado, 2000).
- Peterson, Marilyn E., Forshee's Legacy to the Philippines, (Prescott Pr., Lafayette, Louisiana, 1995)
- Lobaton, Angel F. (1981), The Beautiful American, Bacolod
- Nolido, Reinaldo M., History of the Church, in Bacolod Evangelical Church Book of Remembrance 1902–2002 (Bacolod, 2002)
