= Nursing in the Philippines =

Nursing in the Philippines is provided by professionally trained nurses, who also provide a quarter of the world's overseas nurses. Every year, some 20,000 nurses work in other countries. Nurses in the Philippines are licensed by the Professional Regulatory Commission. The advance of nursing in the Philippines as a career was pioneered by a culture of care that is intrinsic in the Filipino people. This began before Spanish colonization.

== History ==
Only a limited number of Filipino women received primary education in charitable institutions established by Spaniards, this trend continued during the Spanish colonial era. During the Philippine revolution, Filipino women also became the providers of care for wounded revolutionaries. During the American period in the Philippines, Filipino women were given the chance to become educated as nurses, guided by their American nurse and missionary mentors, until nursing became a full-pledged profession in the Philippines, a professional career not only for modern-day women in the country but also for men in the Philippines (as male nurses).

=== Early Philippines ===
Early beliefs of health and illness in the Philippines were in conjunction with beliefs of mysticism and superstitions. The cause of a disease was believed to be either another person, who was an enemy, or a witch, or evil spirits. Filipinos were careful not to upset other people or the evil spirits for the good of their health. These evil spirits could be driven away by people with the power to banish demons: priests or herb doctors. Filipinos who became sick were usually cared for by their female family members or friends in the home.

People thought health was directly related to many superstitions and legends. Back then, there were no medical professionals but men known to practice magic and the supernatural. These herb men were known as “herbicheros.” Victims who suffered from unidentified illnesses were thought to be cursed by witches and wizards known as “mangkukulam/mangagaway.” Dangerous birthing and “pamao” were thought to come from “nunos”. While in labor, the “mabuting hilot” (good midwife) was usually present. If the birth became too dangerous, bad omens and evil sorcerers were thought to be the cause. Exploding gunpowder from a bamboo cane near the head of the person going through the suffering would usually get rid of the bad omen.

=== Spanish colonial rule ===
During Spain's colonial rule (1521–1898) the Philippine education system offered distinct and unequal opportunities for Filipinos based on gender. An example of this sexism was allowing only limited numbers of women to receive primary education in Spanish charitable institutions. Without an education women were unable to gain much knowledge or power. The knowledge of caring for others came from family members and personal experience with the sick. Nursing other individuals was seen as a task, not a job or a profession. During the Spanish regime many specialized hospitals were established to care for the Spanish king's soldiers and civilians. To many elite Filipinos, the Spanish colonial hospitals were places where those who were not so fortunate to have homes, spent their last days until death.

=== Philippine Revolution ===
At the time of the Philippine Revolution many women transformed their homes into quarters to nurse Filipino soldiers and revolutionaries. One of these women was Melchora Aquino, also known as the "mother of the Philippine Revolution". In her old age of about 80, Aquino was a supporter of the revolution by providing food and shelter to the revolutionists. She provided care for those who became sick or wounded. However, a few days after the revolution began, she was arrested by the Spaniards for providing care to the rebels. Because she did not reveal any information to the Spanish about the location of the rebel leader, Aquino was deported to Guam in the Marianas. After six years of exile, she was able to return in 1903, when the Philippines finally gained independence from the Americans. Aquino's work caring for the ill and the wounded during the revolution has brought comparisons to the British Florence Nightingale. Both these women cared for soldiers during war and paved the way for nursing practice.

=== American colonial rule ===
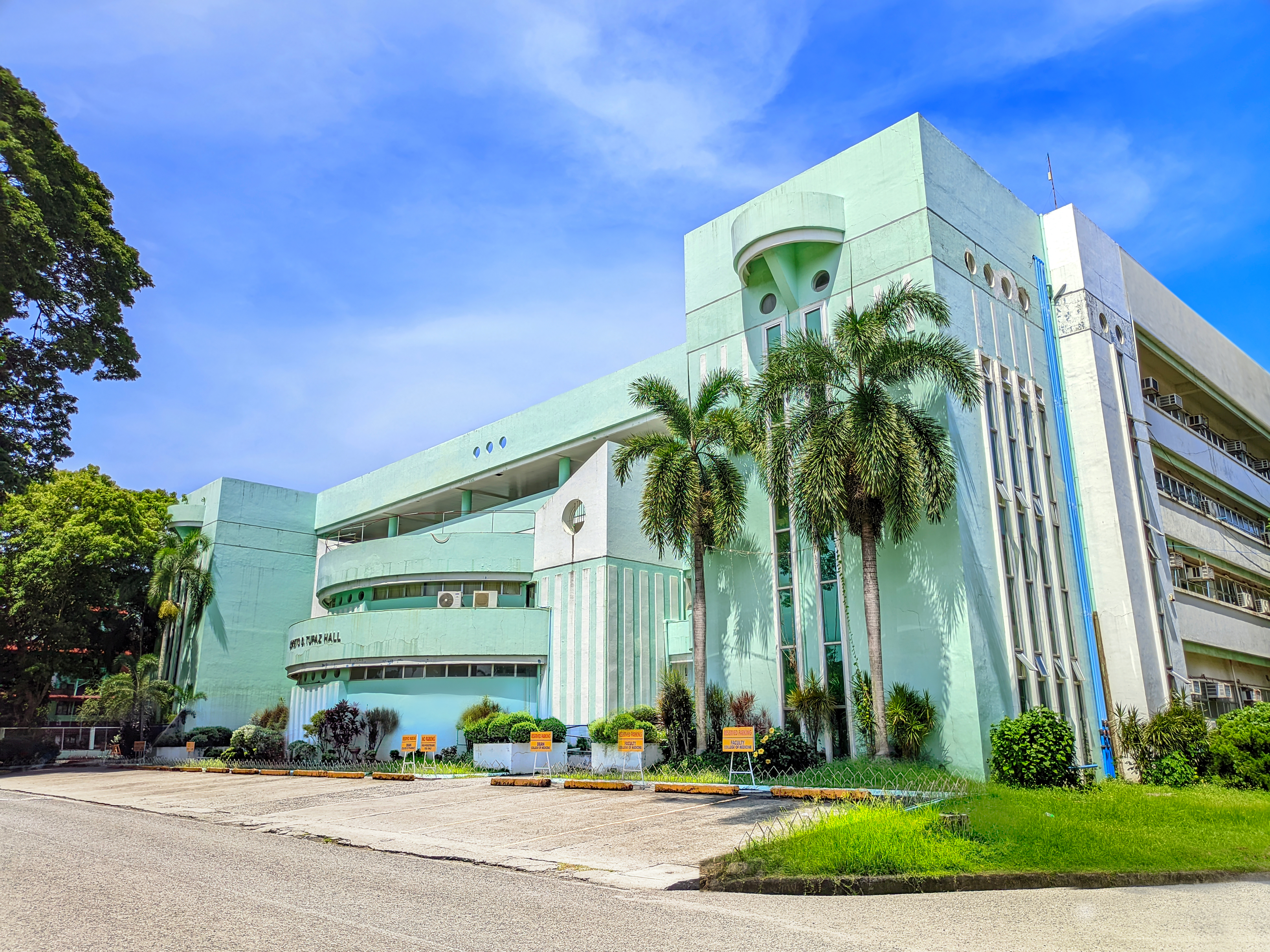
The Union Mission Hospital Training School for Nurses (Now Central Philippine University College of Nursing) which was established in 1906, is the first and oldest running nursing school and college in the Philippines.

Although the Philippines had gained independence from Spain, the United States began to instill their power upon the islands, and a conflict broke out between the Filipinos and the Americans. This was the start of the Philippine–American War. The presence of Americans played a vital role in influencing the development of nursing into a profession. Nurses and missionaries from the United States came to act as nurse mentors for the Filipina women. Nursing education, like teaching and missionary work in the Philippines, provided white American women with a sense of purpose in the colony. This influence then continued with the building of many hospitals where American nurses took charge and Filipino women began to learn under careful eyes.

An example of this was the development of the Iloilo Mission Hospital. In 1901, through the efforts of Dr. and Mrs. Joseph A. Hall, missionaries of the Presbyterian Foreign Mission Board from the United States, a temporary bamboo clinic was erected at Calle Amparo (now Ledesma Street), Iloilo City, to serve as a venue for the treatment of health care to the very poor. This was made possible because Joseph Hall was a doctor and his wife was a nurse. Like other professions, nursing in the Philippines evolved only from the apprenticeship system.

This system laid the foundation upon which the Union Mission Hospital Training School for Nurses (now Central Philippine University College of Nursing) was built in 1906. Between the time that this school was built and the time that the Philippines gained their independence from US colonial rule in 1946, the nursing profession continued to grow with the development of more nursing schools and more Filipina women seeking to become nurses. While taking advantage of these learning opportunities Filipinos began to learn more about the United States and the opportunities that the country could hold for them, such as extending their education and increased pay. This began the migration of nurses to the US. As individuals began travelling to and from the US, the stories they brought home began to spark the interest of others to follow.

=== Post-colonial Philippines ===
After World War II, when Manuel Roxas assumed the presidency of the Republic of the Philippines on July 4, 1946, it officially marked the end of the colonialism between the US and the Philippines. Like much of the rest of the world, the Philippine islands were in ruins and Roxas was determined to rebuild his country. He made it clear to his constituents that the new government was still going to rely heavily on US financial support in order to rehabilitate its national economy. Roxas’ first attempts to balance the Philippines' budget included collecting unpaid taxes, reducing expenses and promoting foreign trade, which would include the exportation of Filipino nurses. Already trained by Americans, Filipino nurses were the perfect candidates to assist the US and other countries experiencing post-World War II shortages. At the time in the Philippines there were also rumors of a nursing shortage; however, this was questionable, due to the expanding health programs, inefficient use of nurses' time and skills, and loss of qualified nurses to other countries. By the mid-1960s, Filipino nurses were entering the US by the thousands. The benefit to the travelling nurses was that they were able to make nearly 20 times as much as they had earned back home. Part of this money would be sent back to their families as remittance, which would boost the Philippine economy. A negative effect of the high exportation rate was that the nurses were adding to their own country's nursing shortage problem. The Philippines also faced losing one of its greatest sources of social capital: educated workers. The negative effects were also seen in the US, as American salaries decreased because Philippine nurses who newly arrive would work the same job at a lower wage.

=== Early 1900s ===
Many US states passed reforms in licensure for nurses. Decreased training mandates were created, as well as stricter adequacies for getting into a nursing institution. For instance, one prerequisite was at least one year of high school education. The idea of having students work in a more active role prior to seeing patients was a new idea that was beginning to pay off.

In the Philippines, it was also the early 1900s when the first school for nursing was established. The program of study was still shattered and unclear. Only a few students were enrolled informally in this kind of education. A legislation or law was needed at the time, contributing to the establishment of the "First True Nursing Law" in 1919. The Filipino Nurses Association was founded on September 2, 1922, which was later renamed to Filipino Nurses Association in 1966.

=== Today ===
The Philippines is the leader in exporting nurses to meet the demands of the United States and other developed nations. It has been argued, however, that the Philippines' persistent production of nurses for the global market is a state strategy to develop an export industry for economic development. Things such as immigration services and nursing licensing authorities encourage the production of nurses for export.

== Brief profile of healthcare ==
Of all registered health practitioners, nurses are among the largest group, even though there are very few nursing positions or jobs available to them. Only 15-25% of jobs in the Philippines are provided for the nursing population. The remainder of the work force go on to seek out other professional career opportunities outside the country. Per year, the national government has approximately 18,000 nursing positions with an eventual turnover of 1,000 careers. The increase of Filipino nurses overseas has attracted the curiosity of other countries to better understand nursing in the Philippines and what makes Filipino nurses accommodating.

== Education ==
The first two years of general education is grounded on liberal arts that strengthen the values and character of the person as a caregiver. The language of instruction in all local institutions is English. This prepares the student for licensure both locally and internationally. This also gives the nurses access to ever-growing literature in the health sciences. The community skills, competence and confidence in the use of English certainly contribute to healthcare in any setting. The curriculum also strengthens the students' capabilities to participate in research in nursing and other health sciences, provides flexibility in the openness to the use of new teaching approaches, and encourages active involvement in extension work that reaches out to the other sectors. All registered nurses in the Philippines are required to have a bachelor's degree in nursing.

The first pursuit to constitute the nursing practice was made by the Director of Health in 1913, but was not officially enacted upon by the Filipino legislature. In 1915, Act No. 2493 was made known; this amended Gov Ph Act 310 so nursing could be practiced. This law allowed "for the registration of graduate nurses under the Bureau of Health" (Philippines). Pre-qualifications were not mandatory in order to become an RN since nurses simply signed up. Each candidate, however, needed to be at least 20 years of age at the time of sign up, and be of adequate health and upstanding character. A law that allowed the practice of nursing was reformed in April 1919. Act 2808, also known as "the First True Nursing Law", established the Board of Examiners for Nurses. The first board exam for nurses was given in 1920.

Today, nurses must acquire their degrees through a combination of competency-based and community-oriented courses. The Philippine curriculum has several advantages compared with those of other Asia Pacific Economic Cooperation (APEC) institutions. This kind of education offers much more than a solely skill-based curriculum can (Rogado 229). The four-year requirement to earn a bachelor's degree in nursing meets the minimum entry requirement for professional nursing practice.

== Legal regulation ==
The Professional Regulation Commission (PRC) oversees the licensing of registered nurses as authorized by the Philippine Nursing Act of 2002.

The Professional Regulatory Nursing Board implements and enforces the Nursing Act. The board is composed of a chairperson and six additional members, all of whom are nurses with at least a master's degree and ten years of nursing experience. The board inspects nursing schools, conducts licensure examinations, issues and monitors certificates of licensure, promulgates a code of ethics, participates in recognizing nursing specialty organizations, and prescribes guidelines and regulations governing the profession under the Nursing Act.

In 2009, the Commission on Higher Education of the Philippines released a report showing the top 20 nursing schools in the country, based on the average passing rates on nursing board examinations. The top 20 nursing schools in the Philippines with 1000 or more examinees are the following:

1. Silliman University, 96.57%
2. Saint Louis University, 95.42%
3. Trinity University of Asia, 95.06%
4. University of Santo Tomas, 95.06%
5. Cebu Doctors' University, 91.89%
6. Saint Paul University, 89.79%
7. Central Philippine University, 86.72%
8. De La Salle University - Health Sciences campus, 85.26%
9. Saint Mary's University, 84.10%
10. San Pedro College, 83. 10%
11. Manila Doctors College, 82.56%
12. Centro Escolar University-Manila, 81.50%
13. Angeles University Foundation, 76.37%
14. Mariano Marcos University, 75.55%
15. University of San Agustin, 73.25%
16. University of Cebu, 70.99%
17. Metropolitan Hospital College of Nursing, 70.54%
18. Ateneo de Davao University, 70.20%
19. San Juan De Dios Education Foundation, 69.91%
20. University of St. La Salle, 67.55%

For schools with 100 to 999 exam takers, the following are the top 20 nursing schools in the Philippines

1. University of the Philippines Manila, 99.41%
2. Xavier University - Ateneo de Cagayan, 97.82%
3. West Visayas State University, 96.75%
4. St. Paul University-Iloilo, 96.16%
5. University of the East Ramon Magsaysay Memorial Medical Center, 95.80%
6. Cebu Normal University, 94.64%
7. Pamantasan ng Lungsod ng Maynila, 93.14%
8. St. Paul University-Dumaguete, 92.29%
9. Mindanao State University, 92.15%
10. Palawan State University, 92.05%
11. Philippine Christian University, 91.35%
12. Velez College, 90.92%
13. Colegio de Sta. Lourdes of Leyte Foundation, 88.55%
14. Chinese General Hospital College of Nursing and Liberal Arts, 87.60%
15. St. Paul University-Manila, 85.31%
16. Easter College, 85.26%
17. Southville International School and Colleges, 84.77%
18. St. Paul University-Quezon City, 83.87%
19. Adamson University, 83.57%
20. University of Makati, 82.20%

Only three schools had a 100% passing rate (with 10 or more examinees) from November 2009 to July 2011: University of the Philippines Manila, Philippine Christian University, and Negros Oriental State University.

== See also ==
- History of medicine in the Philippines
- Philippine Nurses Association
- Philippine Nurses Association of United Kingdom
- Overseas Filipino Worker
