= Central Philippine University College of Medicine =

Medical school at Central Philippine University

- The Central Philippine University College of Medicine Seal
- Motto: Scientia et Fides
- Motto in English: Knowledge and Faith
- Type: Private medical school
- Established: October 12, 2002 (established); 2003 (opened)
- Affiliations: Association of Philippine Medical Colleges
- President: Rev. Dr. Ernest Howard B. Dagohoy, D.Min., M.Div. (18th President of Central Philippine University)
- Dean: Henry Gonzales, M.D.
- Associate Dean: Diadem Pearl S. Equiña, M.D.
- Academic staff: ~50
- Administrative staff: 5
- Students: ~200
- Location: Lopez-Jaena St., Jaro, Iloilo City, Philippines
- Campus: *Main Campus; Central Philippine University (Lopez-Jaena St., Jaro, Iloilo City); Base Hospital; CPU–Iloilo Mission Hospital (Mission Rd., Jaro, Iloilo City)
- Nickname: Griffins
- Website: cpu.edu.ph/college-of-medicine
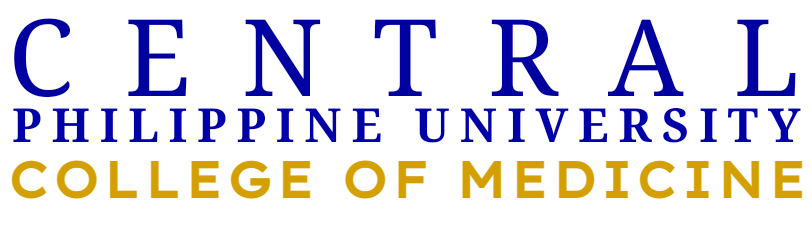

The Central Philippine University College of Medicine, also referred to as CPU COM, CPU College of Medicine, CPU ColMed or CPU Medicine, is the medical school of Central Philippine University, a private university in Iloilo City, Philippines. Established in 2002 and opened in 2003 with its first dean, Dr. Glenn A. M. Catedral, it is one of the youngest colleges and academic units of the university.

The college offers undergraduate Bachelor of Science degrees in Respiratory Therapy and Lifestyle and Fitness management (a program of which the college pioneered and the only one that offers in the Philippines) and the (professional) degree of Doctor of Medicine (MD). Although the medical school was founded in 2003, the idea of establishing a medical school at Central Philippine University was conceived in the 1930s. The CPU–Iloilo Mission Hospital serves as the base hospital and partner institution of the college for its students clinical training.

The medical school produced its first topnotcher since its founding in 2003 when its graduate Jomari Rieza Biñas ranked number three in the March 2016 Physician Licensure Examination in whole Philippines. The college's Bachelor of Science in Physical Therapy program with pioneer graduates in 2019, also produced its first topnotchers in September 2019 - Ahlia Jeshanie Eusoya Demayo (rank number 2) and Precious Ira Canlas Diamante (rank number 10).

Currently, the college temporarily sits at the fourth floor of the Loreto D. Tupaz Hall, with a separate Anatomy Building behind the CPU Church or University Church and the Fine Arts Building of Central.

== Academic programs ==
The CPU College of Medicine confers undergraduate degrees in Bachelor of Science in Respiratory Therapy (BSRT) and Bachelor of Science and Health, Fitness and Lifestyle Management (BSHFLM), the first of its kind in the Philippines.

In the level of professional studies, it offers the Doctor of Medicine (M.D.) degree modeled on a traditional medicine with Christian curriculum academic program, the only of its kind in Panay island.

Part of the college's curriculum in all of its academic offerings, is the clinical training at the university's hospital, the CPU-Iloilo Mission Hospital.

== Rankings and licensure exams performances ==
The CPU College of Medicine ranks among the top medical schools in the Philippines on licensure examinations in the academic programs under its umbrella - Doctor of Medicine and Bachelor of Science in Respiratory Therapy. In the field of medicine, it got in the 19th place as the best medical school. In respiratory therapy program, the college placed 4th in the country as the best school for respiratory therapy course.

In terms of the breakdown of Physician Licensure Examination, the CPU Medicine (ColMed) produced its first topnotcher since it was founded in 2003, Rieza Biñas, who placed at the 3rd rank in the March 2016 Physician Licensure Examination in the country. It was then followed by Dominique Ariel Bingcang Tomampos in March 2017 which rank number 10 in the said licensure examination for Physicians.

The Respiratory Therapy program under the CPU College of Medicine which was established in 2015 and had its pioneer graduates in 2019, has produced two topnotchers in the respiratory therapy licensure examination in September 2019 - Ahlia Jeshanie Eusoya Demayo (rank number 2) and Precious Ira Canlas Diamante (rank number 10).

== Facilities ==
The CPU College of Medicine is temporarily based in the Loreto D. Tupaz Hall of the Central Philippine University College of Nursing with a separate Anatomy Building at the back of the CPU Church.

Off campus, the 3 hectare CPU–Iloilo Mission Hospital, the university hospital of CPU, has an adequate medical facilities for the clinical training immersion of the college's students. The hospital has a two-storey CPU–IMH Medical Education Training Center (CPU–IMH METC) built by the CPU–Iloilo Mission Hospital management for the further advance clinical medical education of CPU College of Medicine's Doctor of Medicine students.

To meet the demand of the college's growing student population, a plan is also in the pipeline of Central Philippine University administration, to build a 7 storey edifice that will house the CPU College of Medicine and the CPU Research Center for Medicine, Food Security and Agriculture.

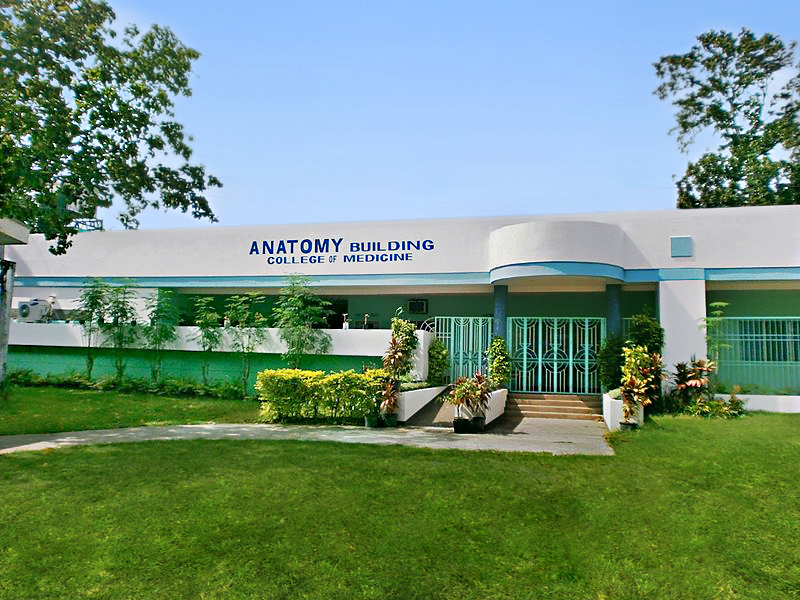
CPU College of Medicine Anatomy Building.

== Footnotes ==
=== Further reading ===
- Nelson, Linnea, A.; Herradura, Elma (1981), Scientia et Fides: The Story of Central Philippine University, Central Philippine University
