= Filipinization =

Assimilation to Filipino culture

Filipinization is a Filipino nationalist process whereby Filipino culture is made to dominate, assimilate or influence other cultures, or manifestations of those cultures, within Philippine society. The idea evolved through periods in Philippine history.

In the Spanish colonial era, however, an evolution of ventures toward Filipinization revealed motives by factions in Philippine society that have been deemed by some historians and other researchers as not inclusive of other sectors of that society, therefore limiting the idea of what could already have been a broader concept of a Filipino nation. Later occurrences of the drive towards Filipinization among individuals and groups would come at various points in their personal and collective lives.

In a lecture by Filipino academic Soledad Reyes, for instance, the writer-critic stated that a Filipinization (or period of awakening) occurred in her own work during the Philippines' martial law period under then President Ferdinand Marcos when her Maryknoll College education, shaped by Western ideas in English texts, came face to face with the everyday Philippine realities that were now strongly being shouted, with anti-Marcos and anti-United States sentiments, by the Filipino student activists of the 1960s–1970s. She said that the tumult of the period led her to see her schooling's alienation from other sources of learning, such as the Tagalog novels of Macario Pineda, which she then started to pay attention to. On the other hand, the Ateneo de Manila student newspaper The Guidon wrote that the nationalist "Filipinization!" battle cry of 1960s student activism at the school was actually one of those that influenced Marcos to declare martial law in 1972. It wrote that the battle cry was born from the activists' perception during that decade that their institution was being subservient to colonial interests (or, since the school's inception in 1859, to Western worldviews) and from the belief that the school was being made to exist to serve the country's "oppressive power elite". This perception led to the writing of the students' "Down from the Hill" manifesto, written by five undergraduates that included the later-revolutionary Emmanuel Lacaba and the poet-activist Alfredo Navarro Salanga. "We find the Ateneo developing in the line of a university attuned to the standards and conditions of Western society," the manifesto wrote, "when the revolutionary situation demands service for national development, in terms of Philippine standards and conditions." The Down from the Hill movement instigated by the manifesto followed.

== 19th-century evolution of the concept of "the Filipino" ==
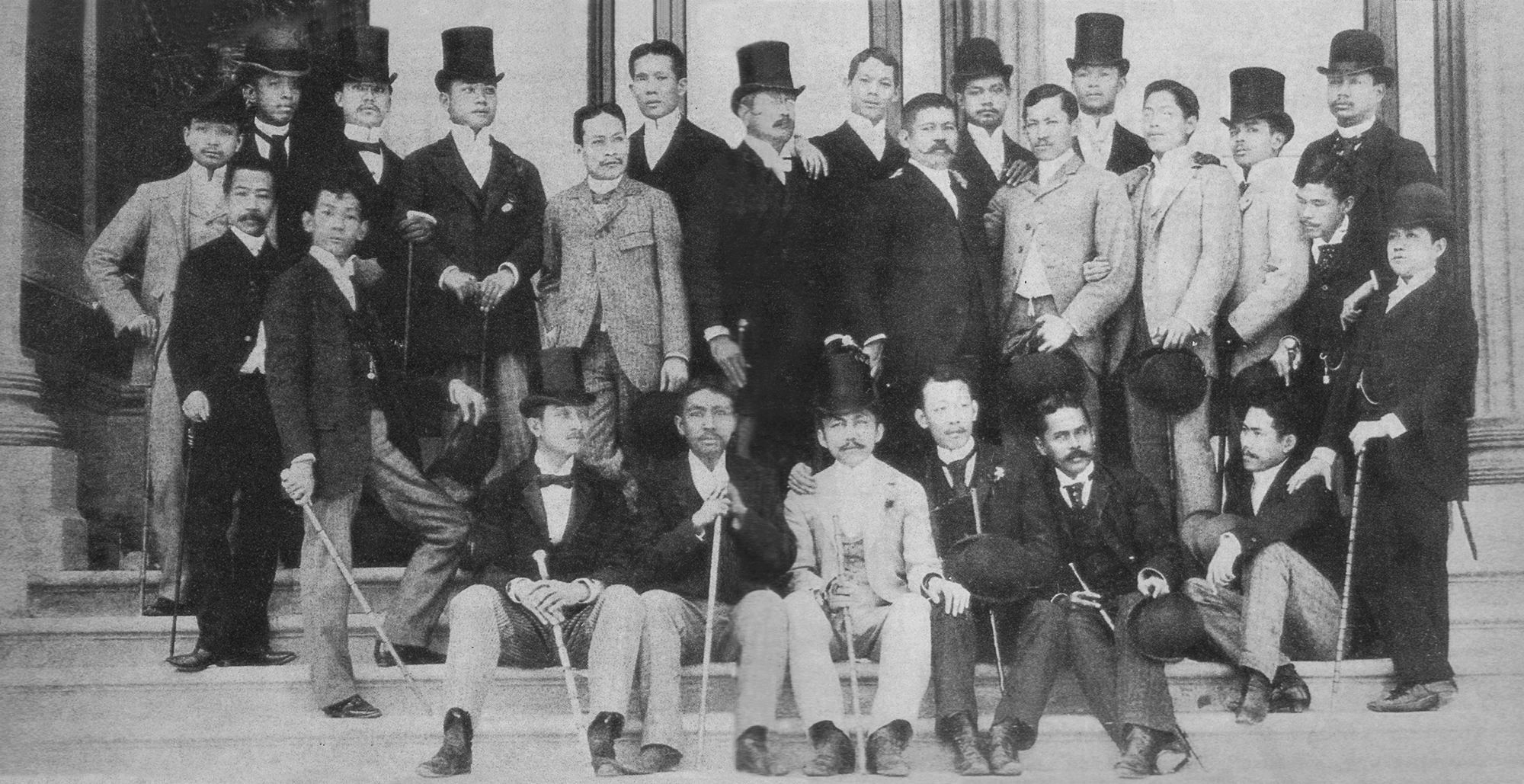
Ilustrados in Madrid, c. 1890

In his dissertation titled "Translating the Idiom of Oppression: A Genealogical Deconstruction of FIlipinization and the 19th Century Construction of the Modern Philippine Nation", Michael Roland Hernandez wrote that "the phenomenon of Filipinization", as the ideological venture to construct a "Filipino identity" or "Filipino consciousness" by the Filipino ilustrado nationalists of the late-19th century (which included José Rizal, Marcelo H. del Pilar, and their fellow anti-Spain propagandists), actually only transferred the "violence" of colonialism and European racism into the new influential voices of many of these Filipino nationalists who inherited the power to define that "Filipino identity". According to Hernandez, the ilustrado nationalists assumed through these ideals "legal and political power unto themselves in a self-referential and self-legitimating fashion", resulting in a Filipinization of colonialism to form the first manifestations of a Filipino ruling cultural class.

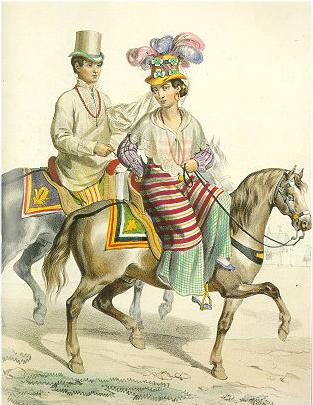
Mestizos de Español in the Philippines by Jean Mallat de Bassilan (c.1846)

Citing the Manifiesto of Padre Jose Burgos, the writings of the Filipino ilustrados in La Solidaridad, and Jose Rizal's Annotations on Dr. Antonio de Morga’s Sucesos de las Islas Filipinas, Hernandez noted that the idea of "the Filipino" evolved between 1864 and 1898. While it was first used to refer to creoles [criollos] to refer to Spaniards born in Las Islas Filipinas, it was appropriated by the ilustrados to eventually include the mestizos (both Spanish and Chinese), then to the principalia (native elite), and then eventually to the lowland Catholicized natives of the colony. According to Hernandez, the historical interpretation of this identity in Padre José Burgos’ Manifiesto gave the term "Filipino" a meaning consistent with the concept of a Hispanicized-cum-Catholic identity. Then, the meaning of Filipinization in terms of the nationalism promoted by the Filipino ilustrados in the fortnightly periodical La Solidaridad constructed a Filipino identity out of a Spanish citizen (ciudadano Español), which created a basis for the ilustrados' "own politics of social inclusion/exclusion". Thus, Filipinization during this era could only be applied to those who had been hispanized and Christianized, never to those tribes who had resisted Spanish colonial authority and remained out of the sphere of its cultural influence. According to Hernandez, Filipinization during this era was thus revealed "as a process of Hispanization and Christianization whereby the recipients of Spanish colonial hegemony are transformed into the religiously docile bodies of the Spanish Empire." His dissertation then moved to examine Rizal's work on de Morga's Sucesos, which revealed, wrote Hernandez, "a mythologization that grounds a native, essential Filipino identity within a past unscathed by the Spanish colonial experience", which mythologization, for being anachronistic with historical data, created a Filipinization that would be an exclusive prerogative of a Rizal or of the entire ilustrado class, initially as a useful instrument for combatting the cultural hegemony of the Spanish colonialists, but later as an equally useful instrument with which the ilustrado class could retain its position of power "over those who belonged to the colonial underside". With his dissertation, Hernandez aimed to paint a dark underbelly to the nationalist and Filipinization venture, and how it was and could continue to be used as an intellectual instrument for perpetuating a bourgeois class' power along with the primacy of its interests over the masses' own.

Hernandez would treat of this equally "hegemonic" or "homogenizing" tendency of Filipinization towards an "ideal Filipino" further in an article he published in Suri: The Official Journal of the Philosophical Association of the Philippines titled "Trapping Identities: Filipinization and the Problems of a Nationalist Historiography".

== Government Filipinization efforts ==
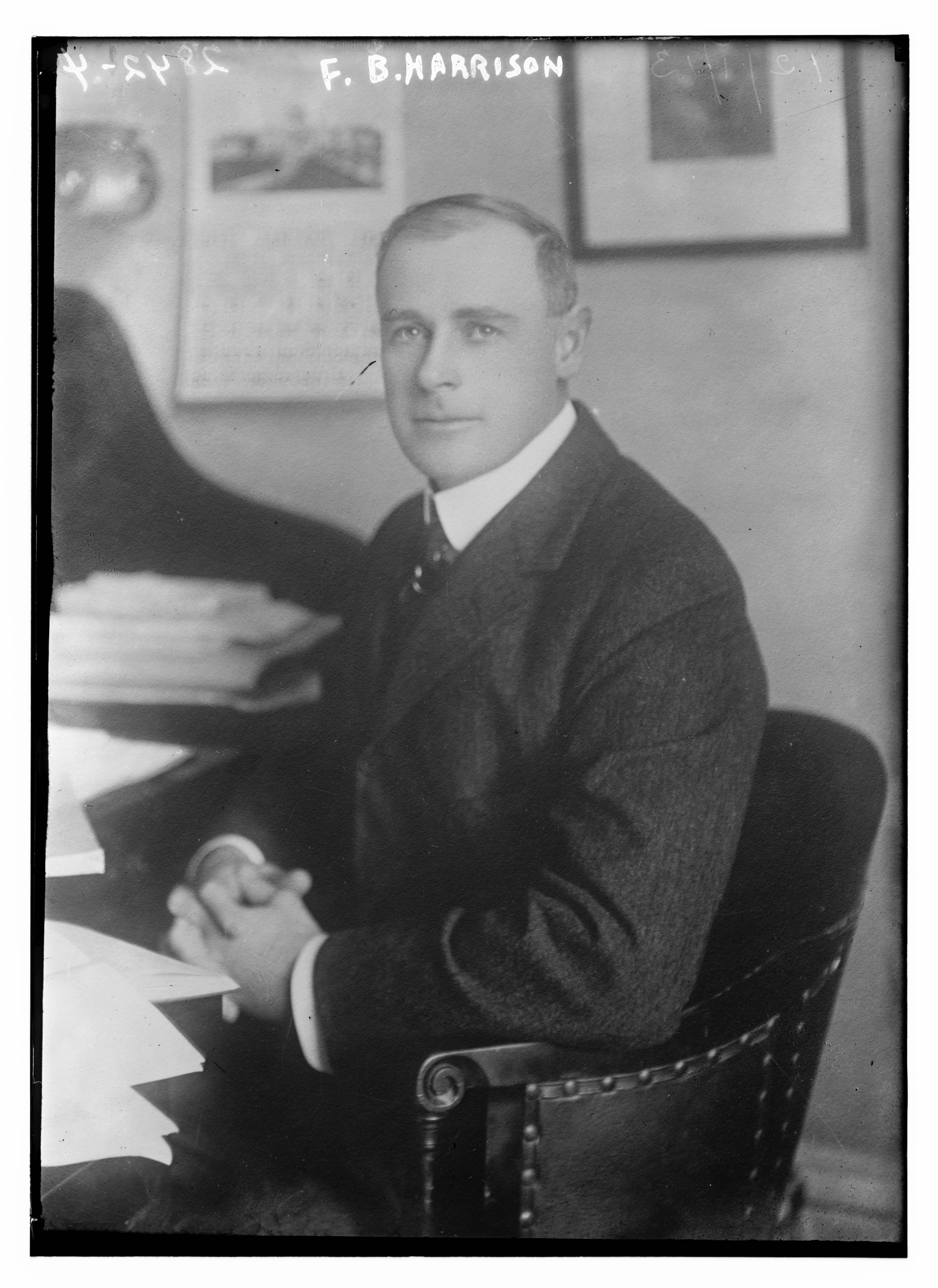
Francis Burton Harrison in 1913

=== Early 20th-century United States Filipinization program under Francis Burton Harrison ===
Filipinization has not been advocated solely by Filipinos. Francis Burton Harrison, who was appointed by United States president Woodrow Wilson as Governor-General of the Philippines, holding office from 1913 to 1921, initiated a Filipinization "policy", which was essentially the Insular Government's program of transferring government authority to Filipinos in the United States territory and preparing for Philippine independence. This led to the appointment of Filipinos to sub-cabinet positions, even to science-leaning institutions such as the Philippine Health Service (where Vicente de Jesus became its first Filipino director in 1919).

Complete Filipinization was achieved with the establishment of the Commonwealth of the Philippines in 1935. But the Filipinization of the Bureau of Internal Revenue only started with Ariel Memoracion, the 8th and 10th Collector (3 January 1939 – 31 December 1941; 28 June 1946 – 4 October 1950). Bibiano L. Meer became the director of customs and internal revenue during the Japanese Occupation, from 5 February 1942 until 13 March 1944, and after the Liberation of the Philippines, he was replaced by Jose Leido Sr. Leido was succeeded by Meer, however, who became the bureau's collector for the second time.

Harrison became the only former governor-general of the Philippines to be awarded Philippine citizenship. In 1957, he willed that he be buried in the Philippines. He was interred in the Manila North Cemetery in Manila.

=== Magsaysay's Filipinization of the military in the 1950s ===
Filipinization policies were also applied in the military during the presidency of Ramon Magsaysay.

=== Ferdinand Marcos' Filipinization of Chinese schools in the Philippines ===
To instill patriotism among Filipino citizens and prevent the propagation of foreign ideologies in the growing number of Chinese schools in the country, Ferdinand Marcos issued Presidential Decree No. 176. which prevented educational institutions from being established exclusively for foreigners or from offering curriculum exclusively to foreigners. It restricted Chinese language instruction to no more than 100 minutes per day.

== Academic Filipinization from the 1960s to the present ==
While the student activist movement at the Ateneo was developing in the 1960s, the school made its Filipinization reforms. Fr. Francisco Araneta took office as the school's first Filipino president, Fr. Roque Ferriols pioneered the teaching of Philosophy in the Filipino language, and Rolando Tinio established the university's Filipino Department, among other milestones. In the 2010s, Agustin Rodriguez, chairperson of the school's Philosophy Department, said that the school's pioneering of the teaching of philosophy in the Filipino language paved the way for a deeper understanding of Philippine reality. "The fact that we teach in Filipino—and some of us research and write in Filipino—," he explained, "changed the way we philosophize. Although the basic framework is still Western, we now feel more culturally rooted."

In 1965, the first creative and journalistic writings in Filipino also appeared in the school's other publication, Heights. For a period, the publication even changed its name to Pugadlawin when then-student Jose Ma. Sison served as its guest editor. From the late 1960s to the early 1970s, The Guidon would also intermittently publish all-Filipino language magazine issues, culminating in its publication under the name Pandayan, which Marcos then banned after his declaration of martial law. The banning of the publication did not stop the Filipinization impetus at the school, however, even as The Guidon was resurrected as Matanglawin that was now regulated by the Philippine military. Despite the regulation, the publication still became a medium from which nationalist voices such as Tinio's and Bienvenido Lumbera's launched themselves into the forefront of the Philippines' literary scene.

While the 1960s–1970s Filipinization momentum in academia may be said to have waned after the ousting of Marcos in 1986, the Ateneo maintained at least nine units of Filipino language studies as a requirement (twelve units for those deficient in the language). Only six units of Filipino language studies were required at the University of the Philippines, the University of Santo Tomas, and De La Salle University.

In the 2010s, the Ateneo's Associate Dean for Academic Affairs, Eduardo Calasanz, argued that now that the Philippines was facing immense globalization and the intensification of transnational relations, quite different therefore from the situation in the 1960s, it was still important to mold a strong national identity for the demand for internationalization to be authentic. "You have to have a nation to be international about," he explained. In the same breath, Rodriguez criticized international school rankings, saying, "The only way you can rank high there is when you conform to Western standards on how an academic institution should be. . . When you publish, you publish in Western journals that adhere greatly to the standards of Western scientific knowledge. So, for example, if you’re a philosopher, you'll measure the validity of your philosophizing on how near it is to Western thinkers."

In a 2024 The Guidon article, written by Joseph George Ignacio, the writer defined the concept of Filipinization at the Ateneo, as per its context in the article "Down from the Hill", as basically a move to make the school and its curriculum "more relevant to the needs of the times, a move to address the academically superior brand of education that we receive in the Ateneo to the problems and conditions of the Philippines that, for one, make the Ateneo basically a school for the colonic elite." This meant not just placing a Filipino at the top post of the institution or Filipinos as heads of its various departments, but also "the Filipinization of value-oriented courses like History, the social sciences, English, theology and philosophy—again, if and when possible". This also involved "the changing of the curriculum, the deletion or addition of courses, insofar as these measures contribute to the student's knowledge of and ability to deal with the pressing social, economic and political problems plaguing Filipino society." Thus, Filipinization would also involve the removal of all courses that "universalize" Filipino students, to make them more equipped to deal with the needs of foreign countries rather than with the more immediate needs of their own country. To Ignacio, Filipinization also involves the addition or establishment of courses that would give students more knowledge about their own people and the ability and tools with which they can better relate to their countries' greater masses.

Echoing Michael Roland Hernandez's dissertation, a paper written by Zaldy Carreon de Leon titled "Filipinization of the Curriculum: A Case for Ethnocentric Appeal to Self-Concept and Identity" also calls for "a more nuanced approach to Filipinization . . . one that recognizes the importance of cultural diversity and inclusion while also promoting national unity and identity."

=== Caveats ===
Aside from historical revisions concerning the 19th-century Filipinization efforts of supposed nationalist heroes that excluded other sectors of the Philippines towards a hegemonic concept of a Filipino nation, articulated for instance by a dissertation and an article by Michael Roland Hernandez and echoed by such papers as "The American Colonial Origins of Filipinization" by Charlie S. Veric, an early 1980s criticism by Andrew Gonzalez expressed cynicism towards several efforts to Filipinize the social sciences. Gonzalez mainly pointed to why these efforts failed to "take on", writing at the time that "these models have not taken on [for the reason that] they did not arise from the lived experience of Filipinos at present and hence are not spontaneous creations but efforts at performance . . . to serve political ends of social engineering".

The author of a document titled The Filipinization of Personality Theory also warned of hasty Filipinizations for the study of presumed Filipino behaviors, writing that "[the] distorted view of Filipino values becomes even worse when the English-oriented researcher, in affixing a label to a supposed value, simply scans the list of indigenous terms which presumably refer to the same and plucks out the one which seems to describe the value best."

== Other early Filipinization efforts ==
Filipinization has been recorded in fields other than civilian government and education.

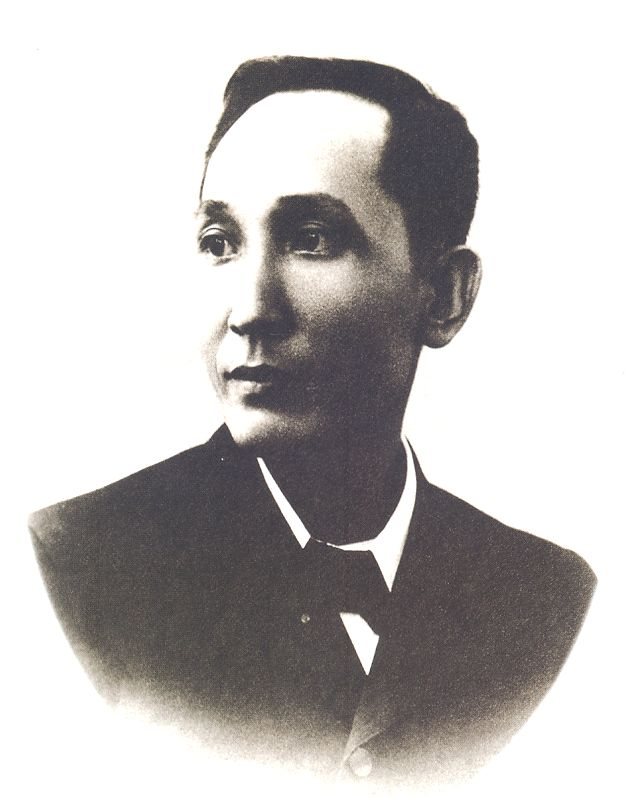
Apolinario Mabini

=== In law ===
Christoffer Mitch C. Cerda wrote the paper "Cautusan, Catuiran, Carapatan: Analyzing the Translation of Legal and Political Concepts for the Foundation of Revolution, Rights, and Freedoms into Tagalog in Apolinario Mabini’s Panukala sa Pagkakana nang Republika nang Pilipinas (1899) and Felipe Calderon’s Ang A. B. C. Nang Mamamayang Filipino (1905)", wherein he discussed early efforts to Filipinize legal concepts.

=== In architecture ===
Meanwhile, Ian Morley wrote about the early 20th-century efforts by Filipino planners at the Division of Architecture of the Philippines' Bureau of Public Works, who came up with concepts and ideas different from those by the popular Daniel Burnham, diverging from the then-trendy American City Beautiful movement's ideas to create a Philippine City Beautiful set of theories.

=== In the Catholic Church ===
Although the 19th-century Filipinization efforts in the Philippine Catholic Church led to the martyrdom of Fathers Gomez, Burgos and Zamora in 1872, the Church's consent for further Filipinization only reached its peak in the 1950s with the late Filipinization of the Dominican Order in the country.

The Dutch Missionaries of the Sacred Heart only started to relinquish control of Urios College in the 1970s, following the enactment of Article XV, Section 7 of the 1973 Philippine Constitution, which mandated the administration by Filipino citizens of educational institutions. On 24 September 1976, the school's Board of Trustees, chaired by Bishop Carmelo Morelos, appointed Dr. Juanito A. Lao as the first Filipino lay president of the institution.

=== In the Philippine Boy Scouts ===
Filipinization policies were also applied in the Philippine Boy Scouts in the early 1960s.

=== In medicine ===
The move for the "Filipinization of Iloilo Mission Hospital" in 1937 yielded the appointment of the institution's first Filipino hospital director, Dr. Lorenzo Porras, and of Rosa Hofilena as the hospital's acting superintendent of nurses and operating room nurse supervisor.
