= Anastacia Giron-Tupas =

Bust and NHI historical marker for Giron-Tupas in her hometown of Laoag

Anastacia Giron-Tupas (1890–1972) was a Filipino nurse and the founder of the Philippine Nurses Association. She was the first Filipino nurse to hold the position of Chief Nurse Superintendent (1890–1972).
