= Silliman University Medical Center =

Private hospital in Negros Oriental, Philippines

- The University Hospital of Silliman University
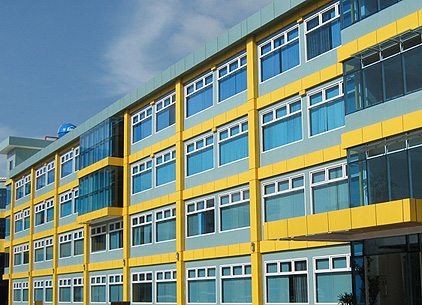
- Silliman University Medical Center Medical Arts Building

- Location within Visayas Location within Philippines

Geography
- Location: Aldecoa Drive, Dumaguete, Negros Oriental, Philippines
- Coordinates: 9°18′46″N 123°18′24″E

Organization
- Care system: Private
- Type: Tertiary, academic and teaching hospital
- Affiliated university: Silliman University

Services
- Standards: Level III tertiary care
- Emergency department: Yes
- Beds: 300

History
- Former name: Dumaguete Mission Hospital
- Founded: 1903; 117 years ago

Links
- Website: www.sumcfi.org

The Silliman University Medical Center, also known as Silliman Medical Center or simply referred to as SU Medical Center or SUMC, is a private tertiary, teaching and academic hospital in Dumaguete, Philippines. Established in 1903 as the Dumaguete Mission Hospital under the auspices of the Presbyterian Foreign Mission Board from the United States by the American missionary doctor Henry Langheim, it is the second oldest American and Protestant founded hospital in the country after CPU–Iloilo Mission Hospital (founded 1901) in Iloilo City, the university hospital of Silliman's sister school, Central Philippine University.

A Level III tertiary private and licensed hospital by the Department of Health, it serves mainly the surrounding community and as the academic, teaching and training hospital and facility of Silliman University in the medical fields and healthcare academic programs of Medical Laboratory Science (Medical Technology), Medical Social Work, Medicine, Nursing, Nutrition and Dietetics, Pharmacy and Rehabilitation Sciences. The hospital's chaplaincy program is served on the other hand by the Silliman University Divinity School.

At present, although owned by the Silliman University, the hospital is managed and administered by a board of trustees and corporation separate from the university, under the Silliman University Medical Center Foundation, Inc.

As originally founded by the Presbyterian missionaries, SU Medical Center is subsequently affiliated with the United Church of Christ in the Philippines but is independent and non-sectarian. SU Medical Center maintains collaborative ties with St. Luke's Medical Center.

== History ==
The Dumaguete Mission Hospital (or Silliman University Mission Hospital) which was established as early as 1901 as a small infirmary, is the forerunner of the present-day Silliman University Medical Center. It was not until later in 1903 that a hospital was formally built in replace of it, by the American missionary doctor, Henry Langheim together with his wife who was also a medical practitioner as founders. The Langheims were the pioneers of Missionary Medical Work in Negros Oriental during when the Philippines was opened to Protestant missions. Henry Langheim and his wife took care of the general day-to-day operations in the hospital. On February 26, 1916, Katipunan Hall on the main campus of Silliman University was inaugurated as the home of Dumaguete Mission Hospital.

During the onset of World War II, it resulted for some of the hospital's facilities and operations being minimized.

In 1942, the Dumaguete Mission Hospital staff agreed to divide their forces, so as to continue to serve both the people who remained in Dumaguete and those who had fled to the hills. Dr Roman Ponce de Leon remained at the hospital in Dumaguete, while Dr. Jose Garcia established an evacuation hospital at Pamplona, Negros Oriental. As Japanese activity stepped up, the evacuation hospital had to close, and Dr Garcia joined the resistance in the interior mountains of Negros island where American missionaries and their families, SU faculty staff, and students operated throughout the duration of the war. After the Philippines was liberated in 1946 the hospital was re-opened.

Since its founding in 1903, Henry Langheim did not only dedicated his service to the mission hospital but to the whole province of Negros Oriental as well. He taught at Silliman University and served as the institution's member of the board of trustees. In 1947, the Board approved the plan for the hospital to become part of a medical union with the insistence that it retain its name and institutional identity. Thus it became part of a bigger organization under a Hospital Advisory Committee and continued to serve and operate under the watchful eyes of medical professionals until it earned recognition for their concern and regard toward the health and medical conditions of the general public.

In the years that passed by, it was replaced by Silliman University Medical Center. In 1974, a cornerstone for the present hospital's location on Aldecoa Drive, was laid down to commence the building of a four-storey modern healthcare facility with passenger elevators, the first in Negros Oriental.

SU Medical Center made a milestone in 1979 when its Van Houweling Research Laboratory discovered and produced a dog vaccine that gave a three-year immunity from rabies. The said development was later used by some countries on their fight against rabies, in collaboration with the World Health Organization.

In the early 2000s, saw the need for the hospital's expansion to server the surrounding community, thus resulting for its management to upgrade its facilities with the addition of newly built structures - the SU Medical Center Specialty Building (4 storey) and the SU Medical Center Medical Arts Building (also a 4-storey structure).

The SU Medical Center maintains collaborative ties with St. Luke's Medical Center.

== Facilities ==
The Silliman University Medical Center has adequate healthcare facilities catering the community in general. It also serves as a base hospital and medical care provider for the faculty and staff members, personnel, students and alumni of Silliman University.

- The Main Building - a 4-storey modern structure which was built in 1974, houses the emergency, pharmacy, out-patient, admin-offices, and clinical laboratories of the hospital. It has the first elevator system in Dumaguete and Negros Oriental.
- The Rev. Dr. Edmundo A. Pantejo Garden Chapel is Silliman University Medical Center's chapel. It is a venue for religious convocations and events of the hospital.
- The latest two addition to the recent expansion hospital has, the SUMC Medical Specialty Building and SUMC Medical Arts Building, are built to cope with the demands the community and the university needs. The structures are both connected or attached with the main hall. The SUMC Medical Arts Building, a 4-storey edifice, has clinics leased and occupied by a plethora of medical doctors of various expertise. The SUMC Medical Specialty Building, also a 4-storey structure, has the same quasi function as the Medical Arts Building and Main Hall.

Notable hospital's healthcare units housed at the SUMC Medical Specialty Building include the SUMC Heart Center Cardiac Diagnostic Unit, SUMC Heart Institute and SUMC Respiratory Center, while at the SUMC Medical Arts Building is the SUMC Nuclear Medicine Center.

== See also ==
- CPU–Iloilo Mission Hospital (the first American and Protestant founded hospital in the Philippines serving as the university hospital of Central Philippine University, the sister school of Silliman University).
