= Roque Ferriols =

Filipino philosopher and Jesuit (1924–2021)

Rev. Fr. Roque J. Ferriols, SJ full name Roque Angel Jamias Ferriols, (August 16, 1924 – August 15, 2021) was a Filipino Jesuit priest and philosopher known for pioneering the use of Tagalog in philosophizing.

Ferriols' efforts are intimately linked to the broader Filipinization movement of the late 1960s to 1970s, a period marked by a shift toward the indigenization of knowledge production. His body of work is also influential to the development of phenomenological thought in the Philippines, in particular, in its interest in philosophizing lived experience.

Among his works is a collection of essays and translations on selected philosophical literature in Magpakatao: Ilang Babasahing Pilosopiko, first published in 1979; an introduction to metaphysics Pambungad sa Metapisika (1991) in which he discussed the meron (often translated as "being"); and a treatise on philosophy of religion Pilosopiya ng Relihiyon (2014) drawing from the Christian existentialist philosophy of Gabriel Marcel, the latter two of which have been canonized in the teaching of philosophy at the Jesuit-run Ateneo de Manila University.

A classicist, having been brought up in the Græco-Roman tradition, Ferriols is also noted for his translations in Filipino from the original Greek, of selected texts from the Pre-Socratics to Aristotle, compiled in his Mga Sinaunang Griyego (The Ancient Greeks).

In 2016, he published the first volume of his memoirs Sulyap sa Aking Pinanggalingan (Glimpses Into My Beginnings) detailing his early life and his experience of the Second World War.

== Early life ==
Ferriols was born in Sampaloc, Manila (North Sampaloc), of Ilocano ancestry, and learned to speak in what he referred to as "North Sampalokese," a variant of Tagalog mixed with Ilocano. He recounts:

At home, the grown-ups talked to each other in Ilocano or Spanish. To the children they talked—condescendingly, I felt—something they called Tagalog. In the grassy roadways children of former farmers and of comers from elsewhere played together and talked to each other in something we called Tagalog.

He continues:

Then it was time to go to school. Trying to make friends in the playground, I talked to my peers in something I thought was Tagalog and was laughed at. In North Sampaloc nobody felt superior to you if you spoke a different accent or mixed Ilocanisms with your Tagalog. Not three kilometers away, the little sons and daughters of the Tagalese were enforcing elitist norms. Slowly I came to know that my language is not Tagalog but North Sampalokese.

His experience of speaking in the peculiar North Sampalokese shaped his thinking on the nature of language and its relevance in pagmumuni-muni (reflection) and pamimilosopiya (philosophizing). In reflecting on the language of his youth decades later, and after a chance encounter with an old neighbor who spoke the same, he thought: "In six years, one comes to know that, for human thinking, North Sampalokese is better than Plato's Greek."

== Religious life and education ==
Ferriols entered the Society of Jesus as a novice in 1941, having entered the Sacred Heart Novitiate in Novaliches at the age of 17. After surviving the war, he studied theology in Woodstock, Maryland and was ordained a priest on June 19, 1954. He later earned his Ph.D. at Fordham University, New York with a dissertation on the philosophy of Sri Aurobindo. At Fordham University, German Catholic philosopher Dietrich von Hildebrand became one of his professors.

Ferriols taught at the defunct Berchmans College in Cebu City before he moved to Loyola School of Theology.

== Philosophizing in Filipino ==
Ferriols began his teaching of philosophy in Filipino in 1969 at the Ateneo de Manila University and early on faced much skepticism from the administration. At present, the university has kept the tradition with about half of classes in philosophy taught in Filipino.

In a short essay "A Memoir of Six Years," he writes:

It was the beginning of school year 1969-1970 and it occurred to a certain character that it was time the Ateneo college offered the entire philosophy core curriculum with Pilipino as the medium of instruction. That character is me. It is now April of '75.

Tagalog was beginning to be very much in the air in the late sixties. One attended public functions at which luminaries of church and/or state spoke bad Tagalog or fumbingly read prepared Tagalog statements. There was a desire to be with Tagalog. There was the usual strong wind for England (and/or America?): speak English, speak to the world, educational, scientific, literary, civilized, und so weiter. The Tagalog ground swell was noiseless, invisible, but tangy enough to cause tremors in the delicate nostrils of both civil and ecclesiastical politicians—those connoisseurs of hidden currents. When respectable people can talk Tagalog in public as badly as I do and be applauded for it, it must be high time for such as me to speak Tagalog in public without having to fear the censorious eyes of some pure Bulakanese.

There were difficulties to begin with. After the lord highs had allowed the experimental [sic] classes (I tried to explain: my classes are not experiments, they are for real, my students are usually human beings, never laboratory rats; but the classes were still called experimental), the scheduler failed to schedule them. "To give you a chance to pick the best times," with a sinister twitch of the eyelids. As a result we had classes during meal times: 7:00 to 8:00 A.M., 12:00 to 1:30 P.M., 6:00 to 7:00 P.M. We were tolerated in private, boasted of in public while we made such rules as: one may eat and drink during class, just so he does it quietly—no chicharon or popcorn, no breaking of bottles—for as the soul regales itself it is not just that the body be left out in the cold. Class members were volunteers. The members of that first year were very game indeed (215-16).

For Ferriols, in philosophizing in Filipino or in other native language, one is awakened into a particular mode of thinking and living. He contends that "each language is a way of being alive that is irreducible...has unrepeatable potentials for seeing and feeling, its very own genius, its own nuance." In so doing, Ferriols invites the speaker/knower to creatively explore the potential of one's language to express their deepest experience.

Critics of the approach point to the practice as unnecessary considering that most educated Filipinos who might be interested in philosophy or in philosophizing spoke, wrote, and read in English. There were also concerns surrounding the method for being potentially confusing arising from difficulties in translation.

== Death ==
Ferriols died on August 15, 2021, at the age of 96, a day short of his 97th birthday.
