= Central Philippine University – College of Nursing =

Nursing school at Central Philippine University

Central Philippine University College of Nursing
- The First Nursing School in the Philippines
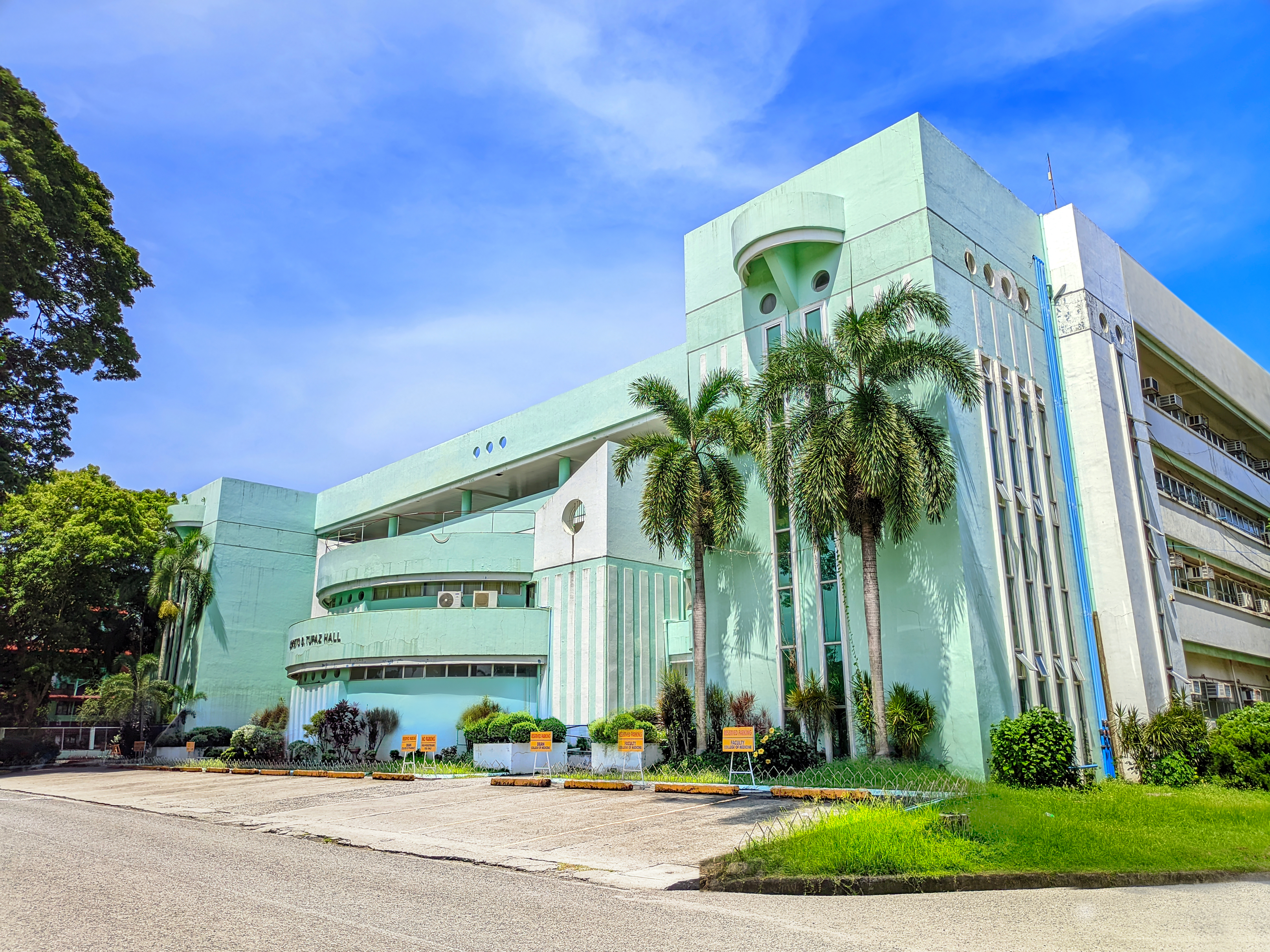
- Loreto D. Tupaz Hall of the CPU College of Nursing
- Former names: June 1906 (Union Mission Hospital Training School for Nurses); March 5, 1932 (Iloilo Mission Hospital Training School for Nurses); 1946 (Central Philippine College – College of Nursing); April 1, 1953 (Central Philippine University College of Nursing); 2014 (Central Philippine University College of Nursing and Allied Health Sciences)
- Motto: Scientia et Fides
- Motto in English: Knowledge and Faith
- Type: Private nursing school
- Established: June 1906 (First School of Nursing in the Philippines)
- President: Rev. Dr. Ernest Howard B. Dagohoy, D.Min., M.Div. (18th President of Central Philippine University)
- Dean: Melba C. Sale, B.S.N, M.A.N
- Location: Jaro, Iloilo City, Iloilo, Philippines; 10°43′49″N 122°32′56″E
- Campus: *Main Campus; Central Philippine University (Lopez-Jaena St., Jaro, Iloilo City) 59.30 acres (24.00 ha); Base Hospital; CPU–Iloilo Mission Hospital (Mission Rd., Jaro, Iloilo City)
- Nickname: CPU CON Nightingales
- Website: cpu.edu.ph/college-of-nursing
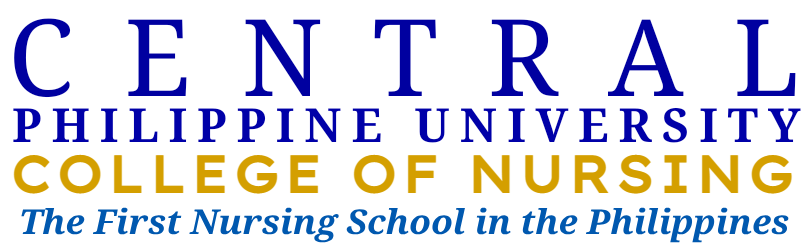

The Central Philippine University College of Nursing, also known as CPU CON or CPU College of Nursing, is a constituent of Central Philippine University, a private Protestant research university in Iloilo City, Philippines. It was established in 1906 as the Union Mission Hospital Training School for Nurses as the first nursing school in the Philippines.

In 1932, it was renamed as the Iloilo Mission Hospital Training School for Nurses when the Union Mission Hospital changed its name. After World War II, the school merged with Central Philippine University and became the Central Philippine University College of Nursing. In 2014, it underwent reorganization and absorbed the Pharmacy and Medical Laboratory Science programs of the College of Arts and Sciences, becoming the College of Nursing and Allied Health Sciences.

In August 2017, the Medical Laboratory Science program separated and became the College of Medical Laboratory Science. This was followed by the Pharmacy program which became the College of Pharmacy. This lead for the college reverting its name back to the College of Nursing.

Currently, the CPU College of Nursing offers an undergraduate nursing program, while graduate studies programs are offer through the CPU School of Graduate Studies. The college is recognized as one of the top nursing schools in the country, ranking seventh in the Philippine Nursing Licensure Examination. It consistently produces topnotchers in this board exam.

The College of Nursing maintains its affiliation with CPU–Iloilo Mission Hospital, which serves as its base hospital for the students' clinical training program and off-campus academic classes.

== History ==
=== Foundation ===
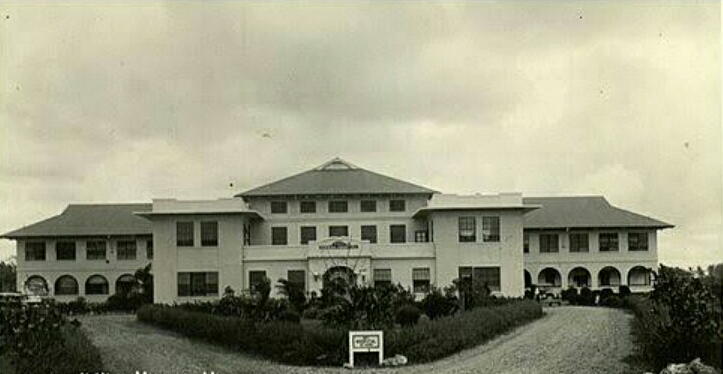
Iloilo Mission Hospital (Union Mission Hospital) founded the Union Mission Hospital Training School for Nurses in 1906, the predecessor of Central Philippine University College of Nursing. (Photo above is the main hall of the hospital in 1931 in its new location in Jaro, Iloilo City)

When the Philippines was opened to the Protestant missionaries after the islands was ceded to the United States by Spain through the Treaty of Paris (1898), one of the early Protestant sects to come to the Philippine islands were the Presbyterians. Iloilo is one of the first places where the said sect started a mission. Thereafter, a comity agreement was made that the Philippine islands would be divided into different Protestant denominations for missions to avoid future conflicts. Thus, the Western Visayas region came to the Baptists yet some Protestant sects were allowed like Presbyterians to do a mission also.

In 1906, five years when Iloilo Mission Hospital was founded by the Protestant Presbyterian American missionaries Dr. Joseph Andrew Hall and his wife in 1901, the Union Mission Hospital Training School for Nurses was established. It was Union Mission Hospital which set the stage for nursing as a profession in the Philippines. Like other professions, nursing in the Philippines evolved from the apprenticeship system. This system laid the foundation upon which the Union Mission Hospital Training School for Nurses (now Central Philippine University College of Nursing and Allied Health Sciences) was built and after which other schools of nursing were later patterned.

Later, the Union Mission Hospital changed its name to Union Hospital and later to Iloilo Mission Hospital where the school changed its name to Iloilo Mission Hospital School of Nursing. The Protestant Baptists are in association with the Presbyterians through the years since the hospital is operating and due to that, the hospital expanded where a piece of land was bought in Jaro City (now a district of Iloilo City to cater more patients.

=== World War II and reconstruction ===
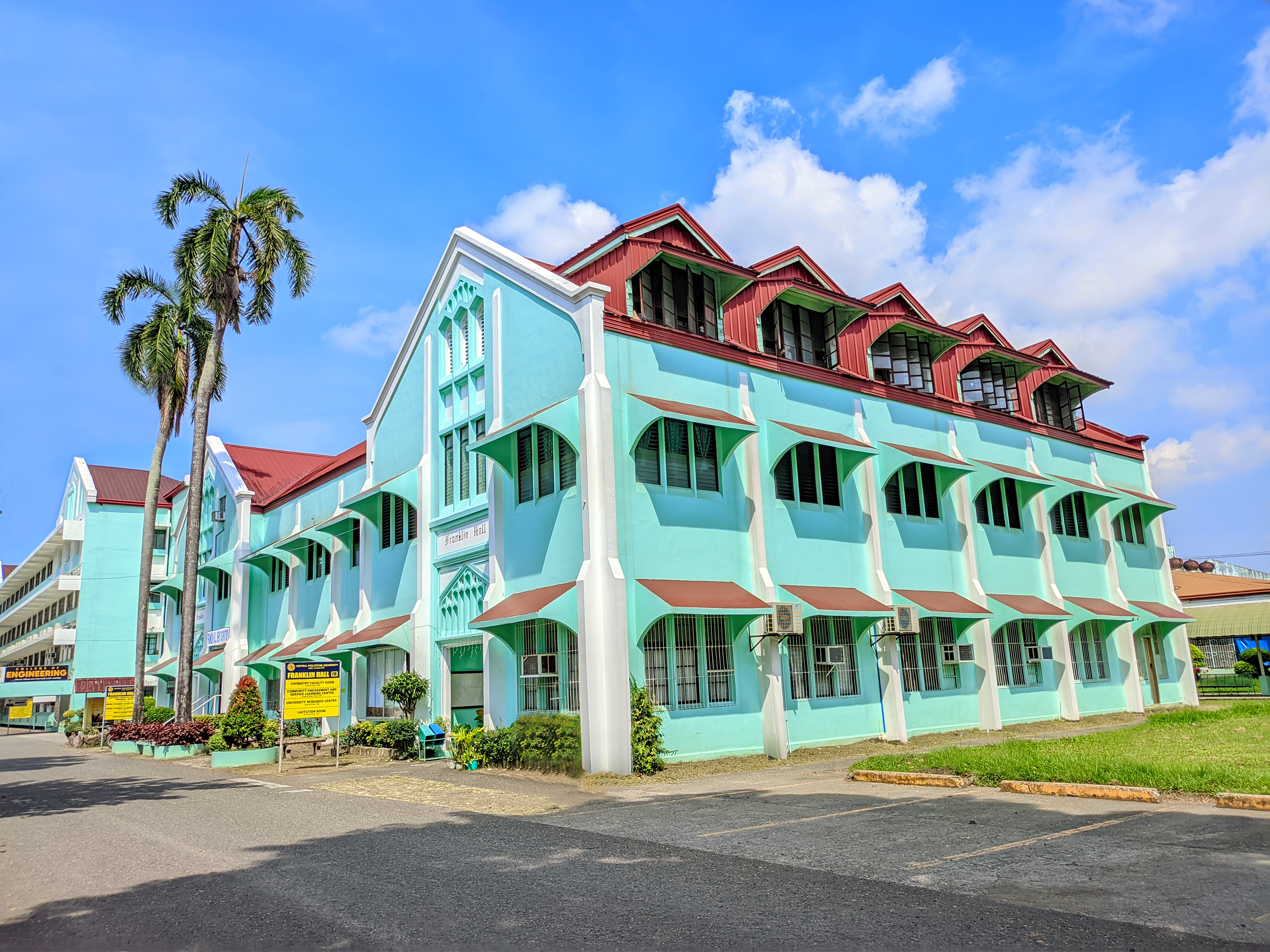
The Franklin Hall, which is now one of the dormitories of Central Philippine University, is where formerly the college was housed, until a newer structure was built where it presently sits.

Thereafter, World War II started which some of the hospital facilities was destroyed. Soon after the war ended, the opening of the school of nursing was initiated by Miss Loreto D. Tupaz. Dr. Henry S. Waters, the postwar director of Iloilo Mission Hospital and also the principal of the Iloilo Mission Hospital School of Nursing in 1946–1947, pressed for the offering, with Central Philippine College (2nd precursor of Central Philippine University), a collegiate course leading to the Bachelor of Science in Nursing degree. The director of the Bureau of Private Schools and the members of the board of examiners for nurses authorized the opening of the Bachelor of Science in Nursing four-year course in 1947. Dr. Henry S. Waters served as acting dean of the new College of Nursing at Central Philippine College (1947–1948). When Dr. Waters returned to the United States, Dr. Teofilo Marte served as the executive secretary (1948–1949); and Miss Loreto D. Tupaz who finished the Bachelor of Science in Nursing degree at CPU, was the acting dean from 1949 to 1950 and served in this capacity until the arrival of Miss Esther Salzman (a Master of Science in Nursing degree holder) and an American Baptist Foreign Mission Society missionary nurse, who held the deanship from 1950 to 1961. During her term, the college offered three curricular programs: the Bachelor of Science in Nursing four-year course, the GN-Bachelor of Science in Nursing Supplemental Course and the Bachelor of Science in Nursing five-year course.

Miss Tupaz and Miss Salzman worked together to develop Central Philippine College of Nursing (later-the Central Philippine University College of Nursing) into a college of distinction, recognized both in the Philippines and abroad. Miss Salzman served as dean until 1961 when she retired in the United States. Miss Lily Plagata, MSN, was appointed to the deanship (1961–1974). When the latter resigned and went abroad, she was replaced by Miss Carmen Centeno, MS, during the remaining months of 1963. Miss Centeno, however, also left for the United States and Miss Loreto D. Tupaz, who finished her MA degree at CPU, resumed the deanship (1963–1970), assisted by Miss Maria Pablico, MSN (1969–1970). Miss Pablico also resigned to work in the U.S. From 1963 to 1973 Miss Tupaz continued to administer the three course programs of the college---the BSN five-year course, the CCT (Clinical Teaching) course, and the BSN Supplemental Course.

Principals and Deans of Central Philippine University College of Nursing
Elizabeth Brinton, 1906–1916
Teodora Sumbalon, 1916
Rose Nicolet, 1916–1923
Hazel Mann, 1923–1931
Flora G. Ernst, 1931–1932; 1934–1942
Dorothy Stevens, 1932–1934
Henry S. Waters, 1947–1948
Esther Salzman, 1950–1961
Carmen Centeno, 1963
Loreto D. Tupaz, 1949–1950; 1963–1970
Lily Plagata, 1961–1974
Natividad Caipang, 1974–1989
Betty Polido, 1990–2000
Lily Lynn V. Somo, 2000–2009
Faith Leila Querol, 2009–Present
References	^{[b]}

On May 1, 1972, Mrs. Natividad C. Caipang, GN, BSN, MA, (CPU); CPH (UP), was appointed assistant dean in preparation for the retirement of Miss Tupaz in 1974. In 1973, Mrs. Caipang went on the Exchange Visitor's Study Tour Program in the United States and Southeast Asia to visit nursing schools. This tour was jointly sponsored by the American Baptist Foreign Mission Society and CPU. Miss Tupaz was appointed as nursing consultant to Mrs. Caipang until her retirement in February 1974.

Mrs. Caipang served as dean from 1973 to 1989. Under her administration, the college curricula underwent several changes in response to the trends in the nursing education at the national level. It was also during her term that the college was accredited with Level II deregulated status (MECS Order No. 36 s. 1984) and later with Level III (DECS Order No. 32s. 1987).

After 16 years of deanship, Mrs. Caipang retired in May, 1989. During the search for a qualified educational leader for the college, an administrative committee chaired by Mrs. Wilma S. Punzalan with Mrs. Lydia F. Robles and Mrs. Genera S. Maglaya as members, was appointed to administer the college until May 1990.

=== 1990s to present ===
On May 1, 1990, upon her return from the United States as a recipient of a doctoral enrichment program in nursing education at the George Mason University in Virginia, U.S., Dr. Betty T. Polido (BSN, MA Ed, MAN, Ed D) was appointed Dean, a position she held until May, 2000. During her nine-year stint as a dean, she accomplished the following: Implementation of Associate in Health Science Education as a preparatory course in Nursing (AHSE); Level III Re-accreditation granted in 1994 and 1999 each for five years; transcultural Nursing Program with Truman State University; inclusion of the college among the Outstanding Schools with Highest Performance in the Nurses’ Licensure Examination; the strengthening of the outreach program of the College of Nursing with the setting up of the KABALAKA Reproductive Health Center as training institution, implementer of various health programs and services and recipients of grants and funds from local and international support agencies; and upgrading of the New Level 2 Skills Laboratory.

On June 1, 2000, Mrs. Lily Lynn V. Somo (a Master of Arts in Nursing degree holder) was appointed Officer-In Charge of the College of Nursing for school year 2000-2001 and has served as the Dean of the college until 2009. During her term, the college has grown to become one of the biggest college in the university with more than 2000 student nurses enrolled. In spite the increase in the population, the college has high passing percentage in the nursing licensure examination. As a proof of this, the Commission on Higher Education acknowledged the college as one of top performing nursing schools in the Philippines ranking seventh (7th) among schools with 1000+ examinees. It was also during her tenure that the college transferred to its present location the Loreto D. Tupaz building.

Last June 2009, Prof. Faith Leila Querol (a Master of Arts in Nursing degree holder) was appointed Officer-In-Charge of the college of nursing. Starting that month, the college implemented the new Bachelor of Science in Nursing curriculum.

At present, the college still maintains its status as one of the top nursing schools in the Philippines along with its Level III accreditation (The second highest level of accreditation that could be granted to an individual program in the Philippines). Recently, the college absorb some of the allied health sciences programs from other colleges of Central Philippine University which is the reason why the college was renamed to Central Philippine University College of Nursing and Allied Health Sciences.

The Clinical Laboratory science (Med Tech) department separated from college in August 2017 and became College of Medical Laboratory Science. The Pharmacy program on the other hand of the college separated also thereafter and became College of Pharmacy.

The separation of the 2 academic programs paved the way for the renaming of college back to the College of Nursing.

== Facilities ==
The CPU College of Nursing offers various facilities for academic classes and clinical training on the main campus of Central Philippine University and CPU–Iloilo Mission Hospital. The structures that are part occupied along with the facilities of the college include:

=== Loreto D. Tupaz Hall ===
A modern piece of architecture, the Loreto D. Tupaz Hall houses the College of Nursing (the College of Medicine) is also temporarily housed in this building) and other medical facilities. As early as 1936, Dr. Henry Waters was head of the College of Nursing based in CPU–Iloilo Mission Hospital there was a dream already to put up a separate school of nursing with a building of its own. This was reiterated in the late 1980s, but the reconstruction of the Henry Luce III library was given focus hence it was set aside then. During that time, the College of Nursing was occupying the ground floor of the Franklin Hall (one of the dormitories and housing facilities of Central Philippine University).

Groundbreaking for the new home of the college of nursing was held on January 19, 2002, and was dedicated the following year. The original name Centennial Nursing Building was later changed to Loreto Tupaz Building on 21 May 2006 and later to Loreto D. Tupaz Hall in memory of Dean Loreto D. Tupaz, pioneer and pillar of the nursing profession in CPU and even in the Philippines. A single glass elevator was later installed in 2015 through a donation of the college's nursing alumni.

Some general sciences subjects of the college on the other hand, is held at the Roblee Science Hall.

=== CPU–Iloilo Mission Hospital ===
Founded in 1901 as Union Mission Hospital that holds the distinction up to this day as the first Protestant founded and American hospital in the Philippines by Joseph Andrew Hall and his wife Jean Russell Hall, who are both American missionaries under the auspices of the Presbyterian church in the United States. The hospital has various facilities for the clinical training and off-campus classes of the college for nursing, pharmacy, medical technology and respiratory therapy programs of the college. In general, the CPU–Iloilo Mission Hospital which serves the community, but also as the university hospital of Central Philippine University. It is independent from the university with its own separate board of trustees and corporation, but its members are largely composed of persons from the Central Philippine University's board of trustees and corporation.

=== Other facilities ===
Other facilities of the CPU College of Nursing for its clinical and academic training include the CPU Birthing Center (Birthing Medical Center) and the CPU Kabakalaka Health Center, a community outreach unit of the college. Both centers are found on CPU's main campus.

== Cultures and traditions ==
=== Capping and Candle Lighting Ceremony ===
Traditionally held at the Rose Memorial Auditorium before a fourth year nursing student who will have their clinical training at the CPU–Iloilo Mission Hospital, the CPU College of Nursing is the first to pioneer such kind of tradition that was later adopted by some nursing schools in the Philippines. The traditional ceremony involves students don their CPU-IMH nursing uniforms, the lighting up of candles and the placement of a nursing cap on the heads of women nursing students.

=== The Logo and Centralian Nurse Pin ===
The Centralian Nurse Pin designates and identifies the wearer as a graduate of Central Philippine University College of Nursing. The design of the pin bears the logo of the college. The pin is a circle enclosed in laurel leaves which symbolizes excellence and the university's vision of Exemplary Christian Education for Life (EXCEL). Each Centralian nurse is called to serve the profession with excellence and to embody the Christian ideals taught by the Alma Mater. The upper half of the other circle burst the word "Iloilo Mission Hospital" to signify the roots of the college - the Union Mission Hospital (Iloilo Mission Hospital) Training School for Nurses, the first nursing school in the Philippines. The lower half of the circle bursts the word "Nursing" to signify the profession. The inner circle has the acronym CPU which stands for Central Philippine University, the Alma Mater. The pin is made in gold and with the letters, CPU, in blue, the two being the colors of the university.

Upon graduation, the Centralian Nurse Pin is bestowed upon the graduating student nurses in a Pinning Ceremony. This symbolizes that the student nurse has satisfactorily completed her training and is now ready to work as a professional nurse. The Directors of the Nursing Service of the different affiliated hospitals as well as the college's faculty members present the pin to the graduating nurses.

== Notable alumni ==
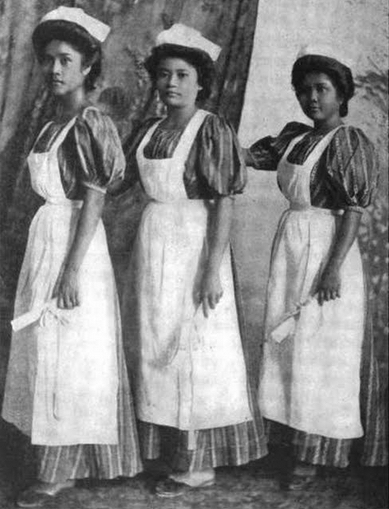
Nicasia Cada, Felipa de la Peña, and Dorotea Caldito, first graduate nurses of the Philippines, from a 1910 publication.

The college's nursing alumni association is a composition through association with the Capiz Emmanuel Hospital and Iloilo Mission Hospital and organized as Central Philippine University-Capiz Emmanuel Hospital and Iloilo Mission Hospital Nurses Alumni Association (CCINAA). It was established in 1925 as Union Mission Hospital Nurses Alumnae Association and later on November 9, 1935, it was renamed to Iloilo Mission Hospital Nurses Alumnae Association. Finally in 1960, the association adopted its present name.

The nurses alumni association sponsors the annual Loreto D. Tupaz Memorial Lecture and association's ball held which is held traditionally in the last week of March. The association is composed of nursing graduates from the said institutions and maintains various chapters throughout the country, United States and other countries outside the Philippines.

The college is the first nursing school in the Philippines and since its founding in 1906, it has produced and associated with notable alumni and other people. The notable people of the college include:

- Nicasia Cada - One of the first three graduate nurses of the Philippines who graduated in 1909.
- Dorotea Caldito - One of the first three graduate nurses of the Philippines who graduated in 1909.
- Felipa De la Pena (Gumabong) - One of the first three graduate nurses of the Philippines who graduated in 1909.
- Loreto D. Tupaz - 1976 Anastacia Giron Tupaz Awardee (highest award for the nursing profession in the Philippines).
- Raquel O. Castillo - 1992 Anastacia Giron Tupaz Awardee (highest award for the nursing profession in the Philippines).
- Natividad Caipang (Class 1954) - 1997 Anastacia Giron Tupaz Awardee (highest award for the nursing profession in the Philippines).
- Lily Ann Baldago- 2002 Anastacia Giron Tupaz Awardee (highest award for the nursing profession in the Philippines) and Professional Regulation Commission Region 6 Director
- Ann Catedrilla-Seisa (Class 1977) - Nursing and Healthcare Facilities Management (Distinguished Centralian Awardee).
- Emelda Frange–Valcarcel - 2000 Awardee in Nursing and Healthcare Administration (Distinguished Centralian Awardee).
- Eden Cadiang-Gopal (Class 1992) - 2007 Outstanding Nurse of the Year by the Philippine Nurses Association of Metropolitan Houston, 2006 Nurse of the Year by the Texas Children Hospital.
- Retired Brigadier General Elvegia Ruiz Mendoza (Class 1956) - First Woman Nurse General Armed Forces of the Philippines .
- Perla Zulueta - Iloilo City Councilor.
- Jonathan Anotado Gapilango (Class 1993) - 2009 Nurse Administrator of the Year PNANJ C.A.R.E. Awards (Outstanding Nurse Awardee).
