= Philippine Nurses Association of United Kingdom =

The PNA-UK logo

The Philippine Nurses Association of United Kingdom (PNA-UK) is the only professional nursing organization of Filipino nurses in the United Kingdom, accredited by the Philippine Nurses Association National Head Office in Manila, Philippines.

The Philippine Nurses Association of United Kingdom (PNA-UK) is a non-profit professional organization of Filipino nurses currently in the United Kingdom. The association was created in response to the growing number of Filipino nurses in the UK.

The Philippine Nursing Association of United Kingdom has laid out a set of vision, mission, and goals, as well as a statement of core values, strategic directions and key outcomes in accordance with the PNA National Office in Manila, Philippines. These statements serve as the Association's foundation for setting priorities and making decisions.

PNA-UK is managed and governed by Filipino nurses in the United Kingdom who are elected by the General Members. The administrative functions are delegated among the members as duly approved and appointed by the elected set of officers, governors and a board of directors.

The Philippine Nurses Association of United Kingdom is the official professional nursing association of Filipino nurses in the United Kingdom, managed and run by Filipino nurses, for Filipino nurses in the United Kingdom.

== Constitution and bylaws ==
The Association is governed by legal and guiding documents, including charitable constitutional documents, a constitution, and by-laws.

== See also ==
- Category:Filipino nurses
- National Health Service
- Nurse
- Nursing and Midwifery Council
- Royal College of Nursing

== See also ==
- History of medicine in the Philippines
