= Iloilo Mission Hospital =

Private hospital in Iloilo City, Philippines

- Central Philippine University–Iloilo Mission Hospital
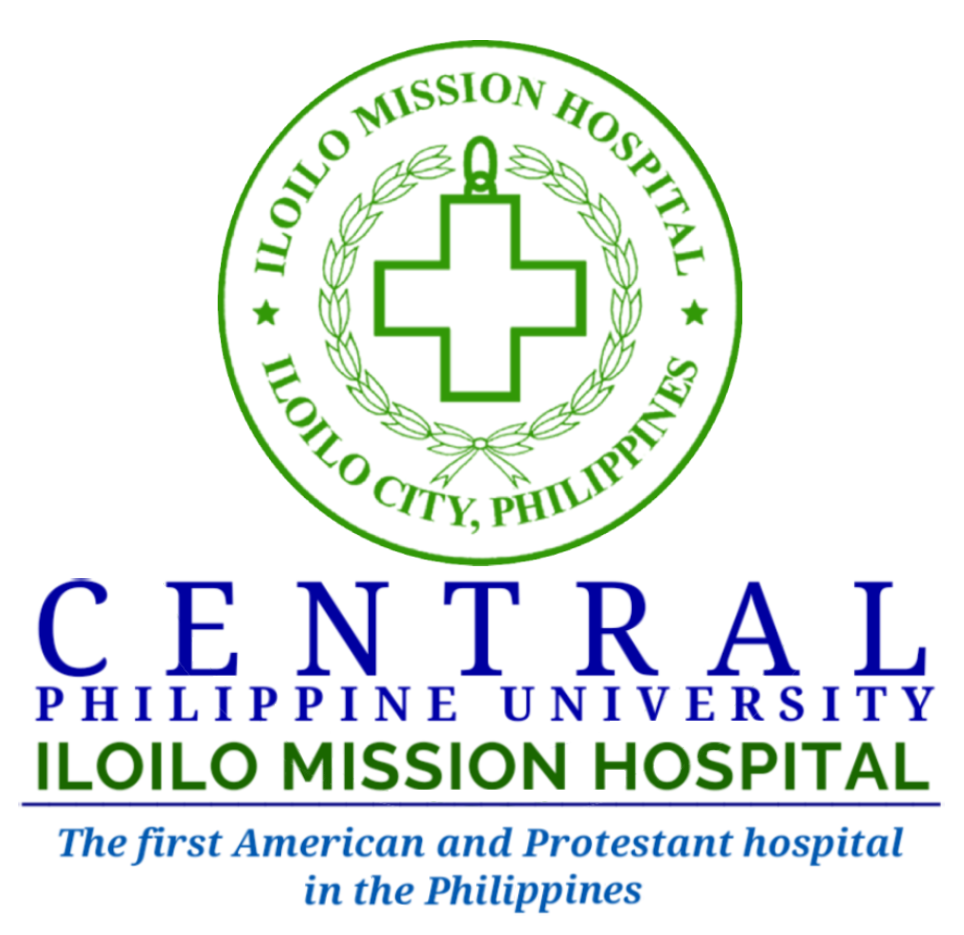

Geography
- Location: Mission Road; Jaro, Iloilo City, Iloilo, Western Visayas, Philippines
- Coordinates: 10°42′51″N 122°33′37″E

Organization
- Care system: Non-profit
- Type: Private tertiary, academic, and teaching hospital
- Religious affiliation: In covenant with the Convention of Philippine Baptist Churches but independent
- Affiliated university: Central Philippine University

Services
- Standards: Level III tertiary care
- Emergency department: Yes

History
- Former name: Union Mission Hospital
- Opened: February 21, 1901; 125 years ago

Links
- Website: Official Website of Iloilo Mission Hospital

The Iloilo Mission Hospital (formally Central Philippine University–Iloilo Mission Hospital), also known as CPU–Iloilo Mission Hospital, CPU–IMH, IMH, or Mission, is a private tertiary, academic, teaching hospital in Jaro, Iloilo City, Philippines. It is managed and operated as the university hospital of Central Philippine University. Established on February 21, 1901 as Union Mission Hospital by the American missionary doctor Joseph Andrew Hall, it is "the first Protestant and American-founded hospital in the Philippines".

It became the first hospital for soldiers and constabulary during the American regime in the Philippines. The Baptists and Presbyterians operated the hospital jointly. Its administration was later ceded to the American Baptist Foreign Mission Society in 1925, becoming the Iloilo Mission Hospital in 1932.

The hospital pioneered nursing education in the Philippines by establishing the Union Mission Hospital Training School for Nurses in 1906, which later became part of Central Philippine University and is now known as the Central Philippine University College of Nursing. The nursing school achieved significant milestones, including producing the first nursing graduates and top-ranking nursing board exam taker, and the first top-performing school in the history of nursing in the Philippines.

While operating as the healthcare institution of Central Philippine University (CPU), the Iloilo Mission Hospital is independent and is administered by a separate board. It is a Level III accredited and licensed tertiary private hospital, providing healthcare services to the community and serving as a teaching and training facility for the university in various medical fields and healthcare programs. Iloilo Mission Hospital predates the CPU's founding (founded in 1905) by four years.

In 2001, the hospital celebrated its centennial and marked its contribution to Philippine and American colonial history, especially in pioneering nursing education. As part of the centennial commemoration, the IMH Centennial Building was constructed, and the hospital acquired the first Philips MX8000 CT Scan machine in Southeast Asia. In May 2019, the hospital acquired the first Siemens Healthineers ACUSON SEQUOIA Ultra-Premium Ultrasound Machine in the Philippines and Southeast Asia.

Iloilo Mission Hospital is accredited for residency training programs in internal medicine, pediatrics, obstetrics and gynecology, family medicine, and surgery. While originally founded by the Presbyterians, it is currently affiliated with the Convention of Philippine Baptist Churches but maintains its independence.

== History ==
=== Arrival of Protestantism and founding of the hospital (1900-1909) ===
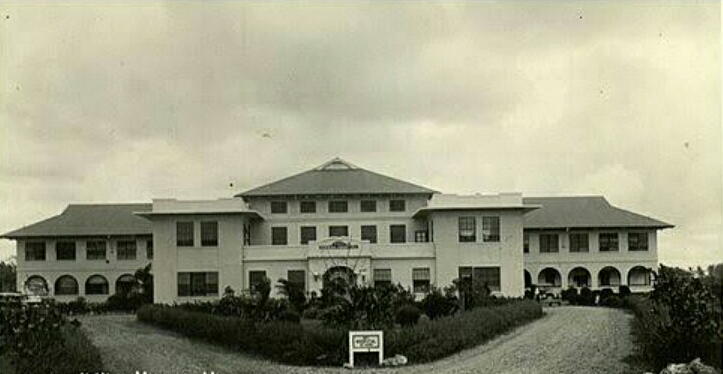
Iloilo Mission Hospital Main Hall in the hospital's new location in Jaro, Iloilo City. The structure which was built in 1929 was finished in 1931.

When the Philippines was ceded by Spain in 1898 to the United States thought the Treaty of Paris (1898), the country was opened to Protestantism, a new faith brought by the Americans. One of the early Protestant sects that came to the Philippines islands were the Presbyterians. When the Presbyterian Americans came to the Philippines, they were allowed to enter various locations in the islands to do their mission works. Iloilo became the very first place where they set foot because of its prominence, being the second most important city after Manilla in the socio-economic sector as a result of the sugar industry boom when its port was opened to the international trade and commerce.

On February 13, 1900, the Philippine islands opened up to the American Protestant missions. Joseph Andrew Hall, an American missionary doctor with his wife Jean Russell Hall, working under auspices of the Presbyterian Church in the United States, saw the need for opening a mission hospital in Iloilo. In 1901, they erected a temporary eight-bed nipa and bamboo structure clinic at Calle Amparo (now Ledesma Street). The clinic-dispensary hospital served as a venue for health care to the very poor in the surrounding community under the help of the Presbyterian Foreign Mission Board in the United States. During the same year, a chapel was also built through the benevolent funds from the Church of Yonkers in the United States; it was named after Dr. George Pentecost, a donating clergyman of said church.

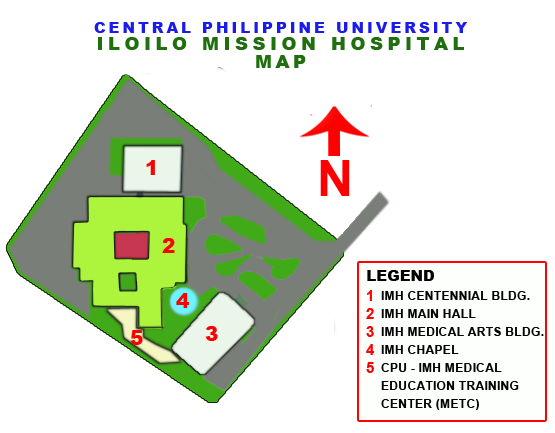
Iloilo Mission Hospital (IMH) Map with (1) IMH Centennial Building, (2) IMH Main Hall, (3) IMH Medical Arts Building, (4) IMH Chapel, and (5) CPU-IMH Medical Education Training Center (IMH METC).

In 1906, due to the growing demand of hospital space for the expanding healthcare needs of the community, the Halls purchased a lot on Iznart Street in Iloilo City (the present day Young Men's Christian Association (YMCA) Iloilo) near the Casa Real de Iloilo (Royal House of Iloilo), the old Iloilo provincial capital. They built a 25-bed hospital made of bamboo and wood with the help of carpenters and an American ex-soldier, Mr. Renfrew.

With the hospital's expansion there came the need for a training program for nurses. The search for young Filipino girls to train as nurses was difficult given that many of them had never heard the word “nurse” before, nor seen one at work. However, through their church connections, Reverend Paulino Solarte, a Presbyterian pastor, helped to recruit two of his sisters to undergo the training for two months. Jean Russell Hall (who was not a nurse) commenced the task of teaching the girls the basics of reading and writing English as well as arithmetic, while Dr. Joseph A. Hall taught them to understand common medical terms, identify surgical instruments, make medical supplies, and take the patient's vital signs such as temperature, pulse, and respiration. Classes were held every afternoon at the house of the Halls. Unfortunately, the Solarte sisters became disheartened by the conduct of the patients who treated them in demeaning ways as if they were housemaids; this led to their decision to leave the training program. Nevertheless, the Halls continued searching for young Filipino women to be trained as nurses, with only "willingness to work" as the entrance requirement.

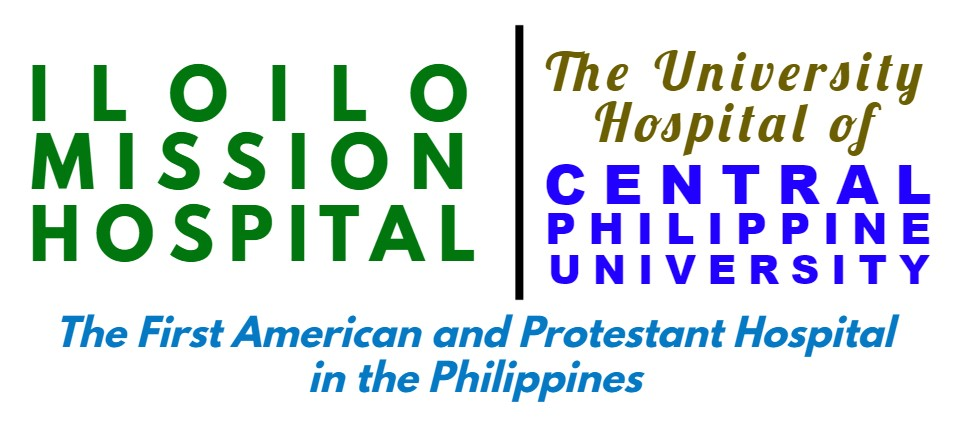
CPU-Iloilo Mission Hospital banner.

After quite some time, two young sisters from Iloilo who were laundry staff for the Union Mission Hospital agreed to help Elizabeth Brinton, an American missionary nurse who arrived on June 3, 1906. Brinton was assigned to take charge of the nursing service as well as the training program for nurses. Thereafter, Nicasia Cada from Oton, Iloilo and Felipe de la Pena from Hippodromo, Iloilo City agreed to join the nursing program. Felipa's mother, Petra de la Pena, was a very sick patient of Dr. Joseph Andrew Hall. After her recovery, she persuaded her daughter to join the training, so Felipa stayed on. These four young women, who were just beginning to learn to read and write, comprised the first group of nursing students who started their training in 1906 and finished in 1909. During the training, the girls were required to wear a red calico uniform with full sleeves gathered to a band just above the elbow and a white cap to keep their hair in place.

=== Establishment of the nurse training school ===
In June 1906, Dr. Joseph Andrew Hall officially opened the Union Mission Hospital Training School for Nurses, the first school of nursing in the Philippines. Jean R. Hall was a valuable helper to Dr. Hall. She helped in the training of the young trainees in addition to her other duties in the hospital. Shortly after the opening of the training school, however, there were difficulties in the organizational set-up of the newly opened hospital and school because of the scheduled furlough of the Halls. To tackle this problem, Dr. Hall requested the Foreign Mission Society to send a reliever. Another missionary doctor, Dr. Mackel, who was scheduled to go to China, took over temporarily. When he left, Dr. Creel, from the government quarantine office, took over briefly. Shortly, Dr. Raphael C. Thomas of the American Baptist Foreign Mission Society (ABFMS) willingly accepted to fill in for Dr. Joseph A. Hall until his return from furlough. Dr. Hall also arranged to get help in the person of Amelia Klein, an American government nurse stationed in Manila, who came on for salary for six months to help Brinton with the nursing service and training program.

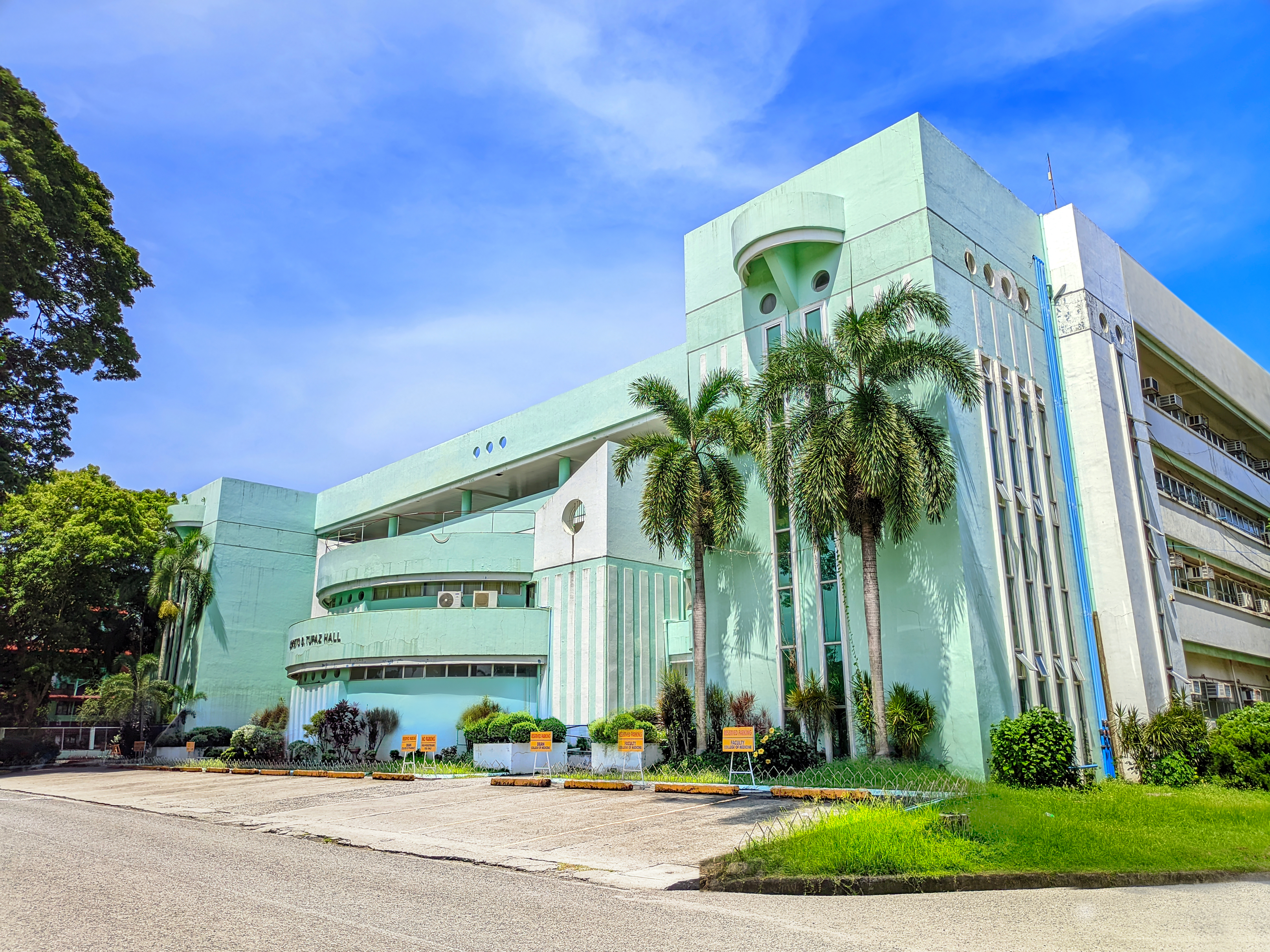
The Loreto D. Tupaz Hall which houses the Central Philippine University College of Nursing (formerly Union Mission Hospital Training School for Nurses), is the first school of nursing in the Philippines.

Since the hospital's founding in 1901, the Protestant Presbyterian and the Protestant Baptist missionaries were very supportive of the medical work of the Union Mission Hospital and its training school for nurses (Union Mission Hospital Training School for Nurses). Both mission agencies saw the need for a united effort in order to provide good quality services to the region, which led to the official unity of the Presbyterian Mission and the American Baptist Mission in 1907, with the Union Mission Hospital as the center for their medical work in the Visayas region.

Unexpectedly, Basilia Caldito dropped out of the training program, which left the three remaining students Dorotea Caldito, Nicasia Cada, and Felipe de la Peña to finish the course. During the training of the three remaining young women, enrichment of their learning experiences was supplied by American educators who were assigned as supervising teachers in Iloilo. The first was George Swank, a Harvard University graduate who taught the nursing students English in night classes with two lessons in a week for over two years. When he returned home to the United States, another English teacher, Richard Bough, took over and taught them for another year. Bough was impressed with the three young women's ability to learn quickly and speak fluently. Follow-up classes were also conducted by Brinton. She taught the three remaining students arithmetic to enable them to obtain the correct proportion of the drugs prescribed by physicians. Though a busy one in her work in the hospital and the training school for nurses, Brinton married businessman John Broadman, an American businessman in Iloilo, in the latter part of 1907. She served the training school for nurses as a principal from June 1906 to 1907. After marrying, she returned to the United States with her husband.

In the latter part of 1907, Christine Benedict took over as the second superintendent of nurses at Union Mission Hospital and as principal of Union Mission Hospital Training School for Nurses. The training of the three nurses continued under the able guidance of Benedict with the assistance of Amelia Klein who, after her six months work earlier with Brinton in 1906, decided to return as a Baptist missionary nurse in 1907.

In 1909, the first graduation was held successfully with the three nursing student graduates Dorotea Caldito, Nicasia Cada, and Felipe de la Peña after they finished their training. The commencement exercises took place at the Pentecost Chapel. One of the special features of the program was the violin music rendered by Don Gil Lopez, assisted by his three daughters; Benita, Marcela and Honey. The music became consistently offered by the Lopezes during every graduation program of the training school for nurses until Don Gil Lopez's death on July 16, 1946. This musical gesture of support and Christian testimony of Lopez family was remembered with gratitude and love by the institution and everyone who had witnessed the ceremonies. The first three nursing graduates of the nursing school in the Philippines were given gold pins inscribed with the name of the school "UMHTSN". Their diploma showed that they had completed the three-year Graduate Nurse (GN) course from school year 1906 to 1909 and were called "Qualified Surgical and Medical Nurses". These graduates of the first school were reminded that they were the results of the hospital and training school whose mission and vision stated thus:

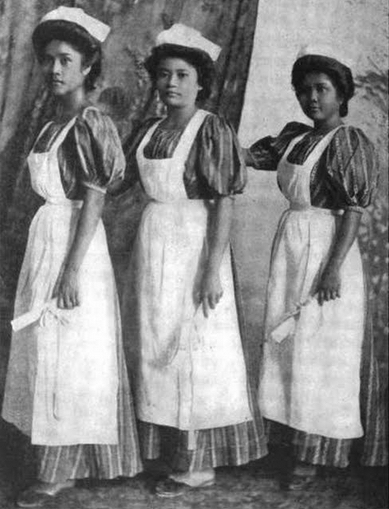
Nicasia Cada, Felipa de la Peña, and Dorotea Caldito, first graduate nurses of the Philippines, from a 1910 publication.

"The purpose of the hospital and training school for nurses was to train young women to care for the sick and become intelligent Christian workers in all matters pertinent to health in the community, giving emphasis to the raising of the health standards of the homes, child care and sanitation which are the foundation for a healthier and stronger Philippines."

The mission and vision of the school have been maintained despite changes over the years. Some forty years later, the work of the Presbyterian and American Baptist Foreign Mission Society in establishing the nursing school gained recognition as the "first training school for nurses in the academe" in the Philippines, which caught attention from some of the leading nursing educators in the country. Among them were Dean Julita Sotejo of the University of the Philippines College of Nursing and Mary Vita Beltran Jackson, who in their published book titled Development of Nursing Education in the Philippines, Learning Nursing at the Bedside in 1965, had an account of an interview with Felipa de la Peña, the only living survivor of the three nursing graduates, about the school of nursing.

Some of the milestones of the nursing school include being the first rank number one top-performing school that had a 100% passing rate and the first nursing school to produce rank number one topnotcher in the first Philippine nursing licensure examination in 1920. The Union Mission Hospital Training School for Nurses and the hospital likewise established the first nurses' alumni association in the Philippines.

The 1920 graduates who took the first ever Philippine Nursing Board Examination performed very well. Christine B. Pratt, who took the exam, became the first topnotcher in the history of nursing education and profession in the Philippines. The Union Mission Hospital Training School for Nurses Alumni Association, spearheaded by Rose Nicolet, was established on May 12, 1925 and is the first of its kind in the Philippines. Its founding date coincided with the global celebration of Florence Nightingale Day in honor of Florence Nightingale, known as the mother of modern nursing.

Other notable achievements of the hospital and the nursing school during the period of 1920 to 1925 included its expansion to a 70-bed hospital, its incorporation and recognition by the Philippine government (with corporation papers legalized by a notary public on November 18, 1920) with incorporators Anna L. Dahlgreen (Registered Nurse), Eleuteria Cortes (Registered Nurse), Presentacion Jaranilla (Registered Nurse), Rose Nicolet (Registered Nurse) and Raphael C. Thomas (Physician), and the first nursing school to send graduates abroad for further studies. This program was possible through the representation of Alice Fitzgerald in the office of the governor general. The graduates included Catalina Demetillo (Jaleco), who was sent to Peking Medical College, Beijing, China under the sponsorship of the Rockefeller Foundation on the advanced studies on child care and infant feeding, Presentacion Jaranilla (Franco), who was sent to Massachusetts General Hospital in Boston, Massachusetts, USA through a sponsorship by Christine Benedict Pratt on the studies of specialization on operating room techniques and general surgery, and Ida McLeroy (Macasa), who went to Columbia University in New York City through a sponsorship from the American Baptist Foreign Mission Society to receive a bachelor's degree in arts.

=== Presbyterian-Baptist mission societies agreement (1925) to 1931 ===
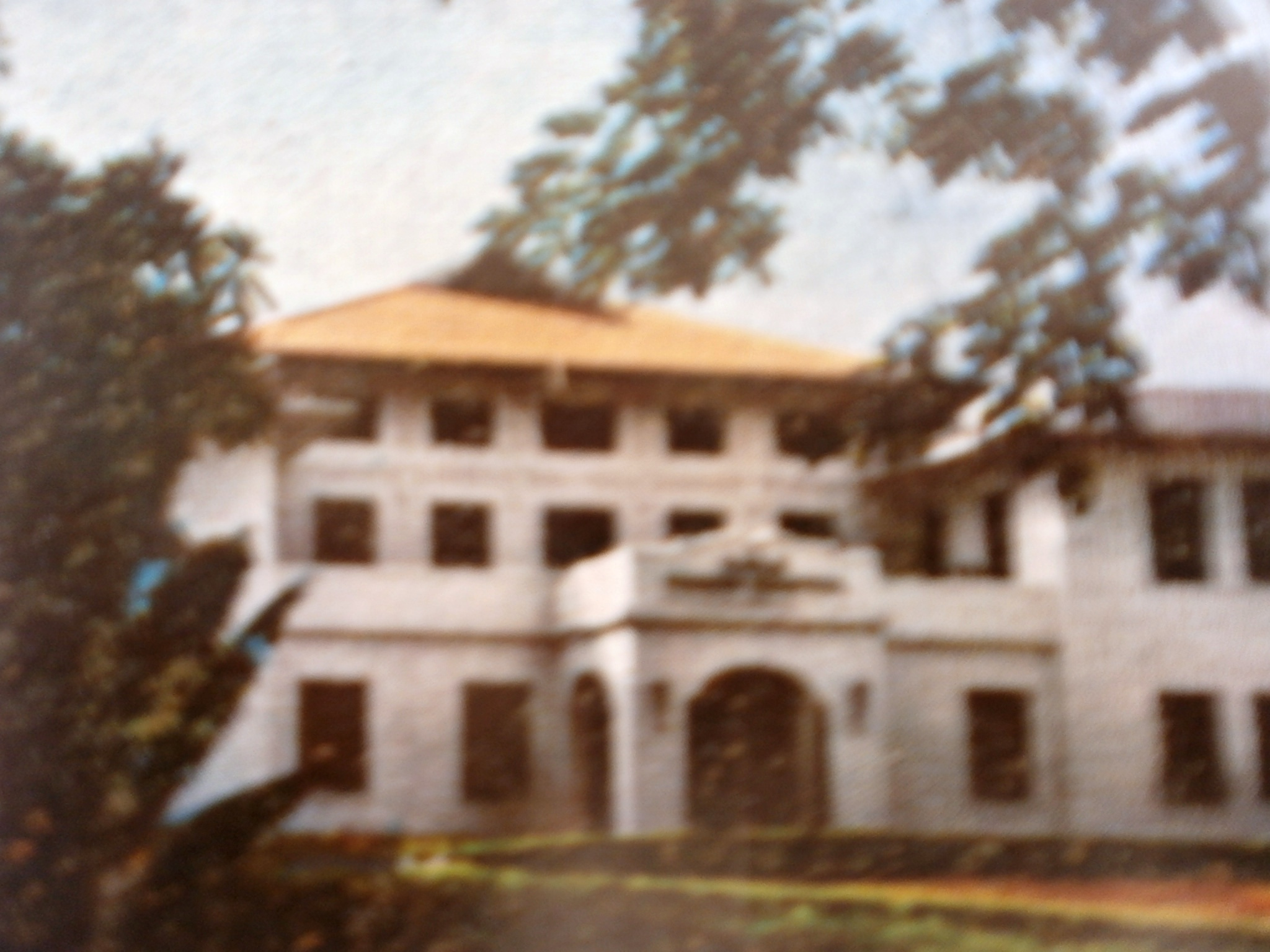
The Iloilo Mission Hospital Main Hall in its new location in 1931 in the City of Jaro (now a present district of Iloilo City).

In 1925, an agreement was reached between the Presbyterian mission and the Baptist mission with the regard to the focus of their mission outreaches. The Presbyterian mission was to focus on the Eastern Visayan region while the Baptists stayed to carry on the work in Western Visayas. The Baptist Mission Society then purchased the share of the Presbyterian Mission's property in Iloilo. With the Baptists long association with the Presbyterians in the running of the hospital, the latter (Presbyterians) turned over the entire medical work to the Baptist Mission Society through Dr. Raphael Thomas. Dr. Joseph Andrew Hall was relocated after the said succession by the Presbyterian Mission to establish the Bethany Hospital and Training School in Tacloban City, Leyte.

In the same year after the hospital was turned over to the Baptists, they continued running the hospital and the ministries that were already ongoing after the Presbyterians left to focus for their outreach in Eastern Visayas. In 1926, Rose Nicolet retired as superintendent of nurses and principal of the nursing school. Her said held positions were later replaced by Hazel O. Mann, a Canadian missionary nurse with the Baptist Mission, while Flora G. Ernst who came from the American Baptist Mission Society, USA, came as her assistant. It was their exceptional executive ability that the training school for nurses expanded as years went by. No school fees were charged on students during Hazel Mann's principalship while they were given books, uniforms and a nurses obstetrical kit after graduation. By 1929, nursing became an accepted profession. Students no longer had to be forced to join. As many students wanted to become nurses, entrance requirements were imposed. Those who completed high school were preferred. From this time to the 1940s the students paid only 40.00 Philippine peso for their textbooks and for the three-year training period.

A new foundation of the Union Mission Hospital was set in 1929. The hospital needed for a new site and a bigger hospital became evident. Dr. Dwight L. Johnson, the Canadian director of the hospital at that time, started a fund campaign to meet this need. The plan gained support from civic-spirited notable Ilonggos in the community of Iloilo like Julian Go and the Lopez family, the hospital and nursing staff, and the American Baptist Foreign Mission Society, which raised an amount needed for the hospital's new site and building. In the same year, the foundation for the 120-bed, concrete hospital was laid in the property the hospital bought at Mission Road (City of Jaro), a present-day district of Iloilo City). Dr. Dwight Johnson was given credit for the planning and construction of Union Mission Hospital's new site and structure.

On September 19, 1931, the Union Mission Hospital started admitting and treating patients in its present location on Mission Road. The hospital plant occupied a lot 29,283 meters or approximately 3 hectares in area. On October 21, 1931 became a joyous day. The new relocated hospital was dedicated with its founder, Dr. Joseph Andrew Hall came all the way from Tacloban City, Leyte, as the guest of honor on the said momentous occasion. Dr. Precy Grigg lost no time in developing the new hospital's buildings and its surroundings. On what used to be a deep rice field and swampy place was a green lawn and rose garden surrounding the new imposing and neat-looking concrete hospital. After office hours, Dr. Grigg loved to work on landscaping the surroundings with plants secured from the islands of Negros and Panay.

=== Renaming of hospital, expansion and filipinization (1932-1937) ===
On March 5, 1932, Union Mission Hospital (UMH) became the Iloilo Mission Hospital (IMH). Likewise the training school was renamed Iloilo Mission Hospital Training School for Nurses (IMHTSN). The hospital onwards continued to grow. It drew students from many parts of the Philippine islands who came to apply for admission to the training school for nurses.

American Directors of Iloilo Mission Hospital
Joseph Andrew Hall, M.D., 1900-1925
Raphael Thomas, M.D., 1907–1926
Dwight L. Johnson, M.D., 1926-1931
Percy Chandler Grigg, M.D., 1930–1934
Henry S. Waters, M.D., 1934-1948
Dorothy Kinny Chambers, M.D., 1940-1941
References	^{[b]}

On March 22, 1932, Loreto D. Tupaz, together with her eight other classmates graduated while her as a class valedictorian. She was awarded the "Alumni Efficiency Medal". As a student she had demonstrated leadership and the hospital promptly employed her as clinic nurse and supervisor. During the latter part of 1932, Flora Ernst was reassigned to the Capiz Emmanuel Hospital in Roxas City, Capiz to replace Jennie Adams, a registered nurse, who went on a furlough for a year. Dorothy Stevens became the acting superintendent and principal of the Iloilo Mission Hospital Training School for Nurses. Loreto Tupaz became a full-time classroom instructor at the training school.

In 1934 many changers took place in the organizational set-up of the new hospital. Dr. Grigg married Pauline Holland, the niece of C.N. Hodges, a prominent American business tycoon in city of Iloilo during that time. The couple moved back to the United States after their wedding. Dr. Grigg's departure meant a vacancy in the hospital and Dr. Cornelio T. Blancaflor had to manage the hospital as acting hospital director and also as chairman for Board of Control. For six months, Dr. Frederic W. Meyer, who was a director of Capiz Emmanuel Hospital in Capiz, came to Iloilo every week to see and treat patients at the Iloilo Mission Hospital. He want home to Capiz on weekends to be with his family. In October 1934, Dr. and Mrs. Henry W. Waters arrived in Iloilo City. The couple won the hearts of many patients and friends in the hospital and the community. Mrs. Anna Waters, being a nurse, helped in the teaching program of the school and at the same time took an active part in the Hospital Ladies Auxiliary activities.

A noteworthy addition to the services of the Iloilo Mission Hospital by that time was the Tuberculosis Pavilion in March 1935. The building begun with funds raised in 1910. The funds generally grew until it was large enough to put up a cottage suitable for the needs of TB patients. This additional service department augmented the learning experiences of the nursing students. It was also in the same year, according to the Iloilo Mission Hospital Training School for Nurses school records, that high school graduates with an average of 80% were given preference for admission to the said school.

In 1937, the move for the Filipinization of Iloilo Mission Hospital yielded for the institution to appoint its first Filipino hospital director, Dr. Lorenzo Porras while Rosa Hofilena became the acting superintendent of nurses and at the same time as an operating room nurse supervisor. Flora Ernst was given the post Technical Adviser of Nursing Services. Dr. Henry Waters and another medical missionary doctor, Dorothy K. Chambers were given the titles Associate Physicians. In the early part of 1939, Rosa Hofilena resigned, and Flora Ernst was recalled to become superintendent of nurses again. In 1937 Loreto Tupaz was appointed full-time principal of the training school. With Flora Ernst as full-time superintendent of nurses in the hospital and Tupaz in the training school for nurses, the running of both hospital and training school was in capable and dedicated hands.

The hospital was run by the American Protestants from its foundation in 1906 until the late 1940s. The last American director of the hospital was Henry S. Waters from 1934 to 1948.

=== World War II and post-war reconstruction ===
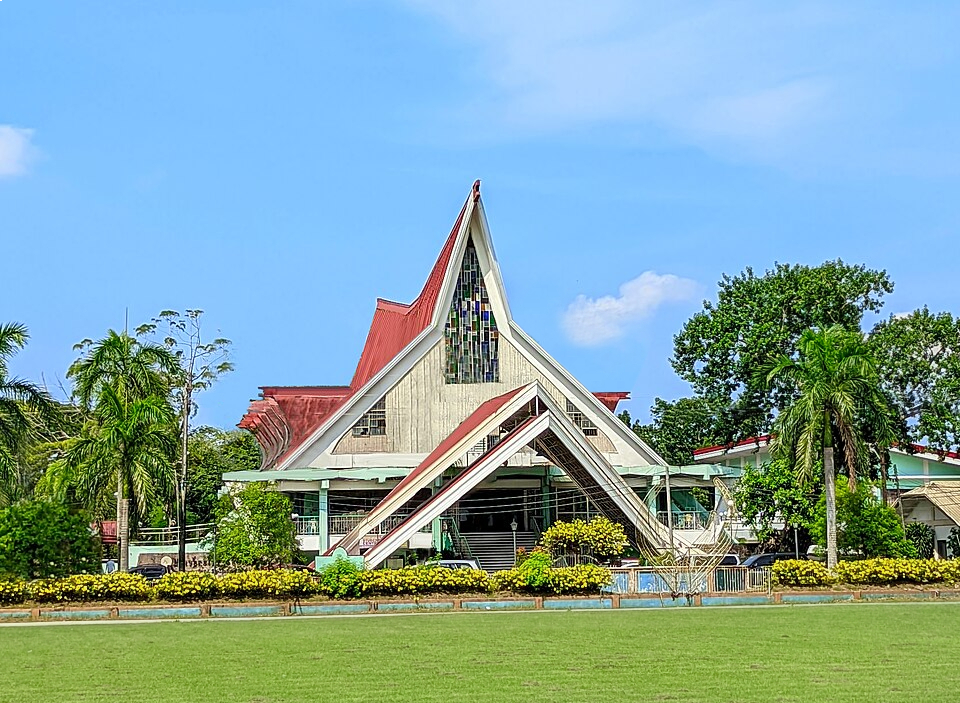
The Central Philippine University, founded through a benevolent grant by the American business magnate John D. Rockefeller as the first Baptist and second American founded university in the Philippines and in Asia, is Iloilo Mission Hospital's affiliated university.

World War II broke out with much damage in the hospital facilities but later when the war ended in 1946–47, Dr. Henry S. Waters, the postwar director of Hospital and also principal of the Iloilo Mission Hospital School of Nursing in 1946–1947, pressed for the offering, with Central Philippine College (the forerunner of Central Philippine University), a collegiate course leading to the Bachelor of Science in Nursing degree.

The director of the Bureau of Private Schools and the members of the board of examiners for nurses authorized the opening of the Bachelor of Science in Nursing four-year course in 1947 that resulted the school's operation transferred to the college. Waters served as acting dean of the new College of Nursing at Central Philippine College (1947–1948). When he returned to the United States, Dr. Teofilo Marte served as the executive secretary (1948–1949).

Loreto D. Tupaz was the acting dean from 1949 to 1950 and served in this capacity until the arrival of Esther Salzman who held the deanship from 1950 to 1961. During her term, the college offered three curricular programs: the Bachelor of Science in Nursing four-year course, the GN-Bachelor of Science in Nursing Supplemental Course and the Bachelor of Science in Nursing five-year course.

Tupaz and Salzman worked together to develop Central Philippine University College of Nursing into a college of distinction, recognized both in the Philippines and abroad. Salzman served as dean until 1961 when she retired in the United States. Lily Plagata was appointed to the deanship in 1961, but resigned and went abroad in 1963. Carmen Centeno replaced Plagata as dean for the rest of 1963, but she also eventually left for the United States. Tupaz resumed the deanship from 1963 until 1970, but also continued to administer the three course programs of the college, the Bachelor of Science in Nursing five-year course, the CCT (Clinical Teaching) course, and the Bachelor of Science in Nursing Supplemental Course.

=== Centennial and recent history ===
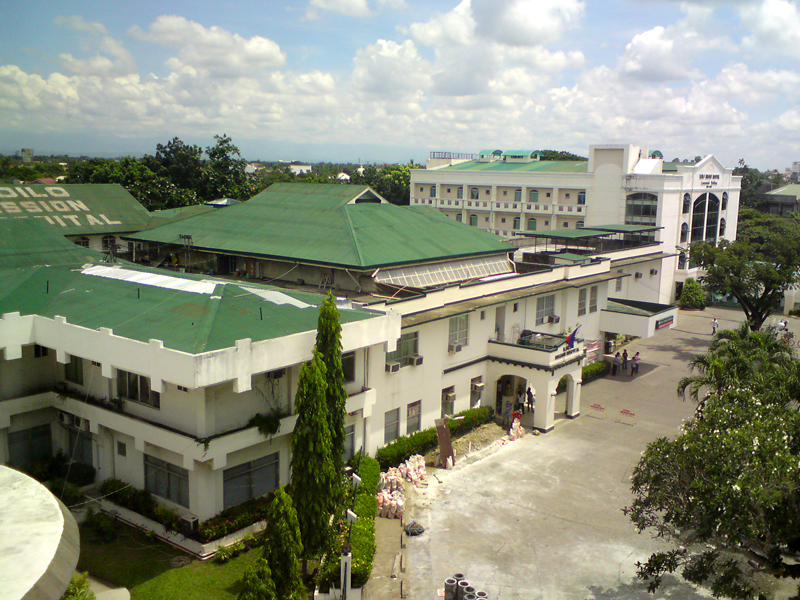
The Main Hall and Centennial Building's (at the far right) view from the IMH Medical Arts Building.

In 2001, the hospital celebrated its centennial with year long activities. A four-story Centennial Building was also inaugurated that year. in 2004, Iloilo Mission Hospital acquired the Philips MX8000 CT Scan machine, the first of its kind in South East Asia.

In 2006, the Central Philippine University College of Nursing celebrated also its centennial as the first nursing school in the Philippines with its history that spans for a century of its existence since it was founded or established by the Protestant Presbyterian Americans as the Union Mission Hospital Training School for Nurses.

In 2007, the old Nurses' Home was demolished to give way to the new Medical Arts Building. The building was completed and inaugurated in 2009. Recent expansion plans include a 7-storey modern designed Iloilo Mission Hospital Medical Center (IMH Medical Center) equipped with state-of-the-art facilities. At present, Iloilo Mission Hospital maintains an affiliation and linkage with the Convention of Philippine Baptist Churches but it is independent and non-sectarian. It also serves as the affiliated university medical center and healthcare provider of Central Philippine University, in which its board of trustees and administration are largely composed of members from the university's board of trustees and corporation.

== Historic firsts ==
- First and oldest American and Protestant hospital in the Philippines

CPU–Iloilo Mission Hospital has the distinction of being the first and oldest American and Protestant founded hospital in the Philippines. As established by the American missionary doctor Joseph Andrew Hall and his wife Jean Russell Hall in 1901 as Sabine Haines Memorial Union Mission Hospital, it started as a dispensary hospital. Its original founding name was in honor of Charles Haines's son, the donor responsible for the establishment of the hospital.

- First hospital for constabulary and soldiers

During the extent of the American colonial period in the Philippines, Iloilo Mission Hospital is the first hospital for the Philippine Constabulary (predecessor of Philippine National Police) and the soldiers.

- First nursing school in the Philippines

Another distinction of the hospital is its legacy of establishing the Union Mission Hospital Training School for Nurses in 1906, the first nursing school in the Philippines. It was folded during post World War 2 into Central Philippine University and became its organic academic granting unit, and was renamed to Central Philippine University College of Nursing.

- Pioneer nursing graduates and licensure examinations milestones

The hospital's establishment of its nursing school in 1906 has yielded three nursing graduates in 1909, who after completion of their education and training at Iloilo Mission Hospital, has the distinction of being the first three nursing education and clinical training graduates in the Philippines. In the history of nursing education and licensure examination, the nursing school produced the first rank number 1 topnotcher in the first ever Philippine Nursing Licensure Examination in 1920. The school garnered a 100% passing rate as the first number 1 top performing nursing school in the said board exam also.

- Modern medical equipment

The hospital's continued expansion and upgrading of its facilities include acquisitions of modern equipment and machines for medical care. In 2001 during its centennial celebration, the CPU–Iloilo Mission Hospital management purchased the Philips MX8000 CT Scan machine, the first of its kind in Southeast Asia. Thereafter in 2019, it was followed again through the acquisition of the Siemens Healthineers ACUSON SEQUOIA Ultra-Premium Ultrasound Machine, also which is same with the Philips MX8000 machine, is the first in the Philippines and in Southeast Asia.

== Administration ==
The CPU–Iloilo Mission Hospital, which serves as the university hospital of Central Philippine University (CPU), is an independent entity and is administered and managed by a separate Board of Trustees and Corporation from the said university (CPU). The hospital's administration is currently chaired by Elmer Pedregosa.

Its corporate management and board of trustees are composed largely of personnel from Central Philippine University.

Dr. Elmer Pedregosa (MD, MPH, MHA, and FPCHA), the administrator/director of Iloilo Mission Hospital, also serves as the chairman of the board of corporation and trustees of Central Philippine University. CPU-Iloilo Mission Hospital is currently chaired by Atty. Juanito M. Acanto (LLB). Attorney Acanto also served as the President of Central Philippine University from 1996-2008. After his tenure as a university president in 2008, he was appointed as the chairman of Iloilo Mission Hospital.

In September 2026, Dr. Florentino Alerta II, a CPU College of Medicine faculty staff and a member of the Central Philippine University Corporation, became the Medical Director of Iloilo Mission Hospital.

Subsequently, the hospital, which is affiliated with the Convention of Philippine Baptist Churches (CPBC), is non-sectarian and independent in governance.

== Facilities ==
CPU–Iloilo Mission Hospital has adequate medical and health facilities to cater to the community and the general public. Throughout the years since its founding in 1901, new structures have been built to cope with its continuing expansion in healthcare services.

Formerly located in Ledesma and Iznart Streets in City Proper during its precursor years as a small dispensary and hospital in 1901, Iloilo Mission Hospital has grown exponentially that made its administration to purchase a 3-hectare piece of land in the former City of Jaro (now a district of Iloilo City) where it now stands at the present.

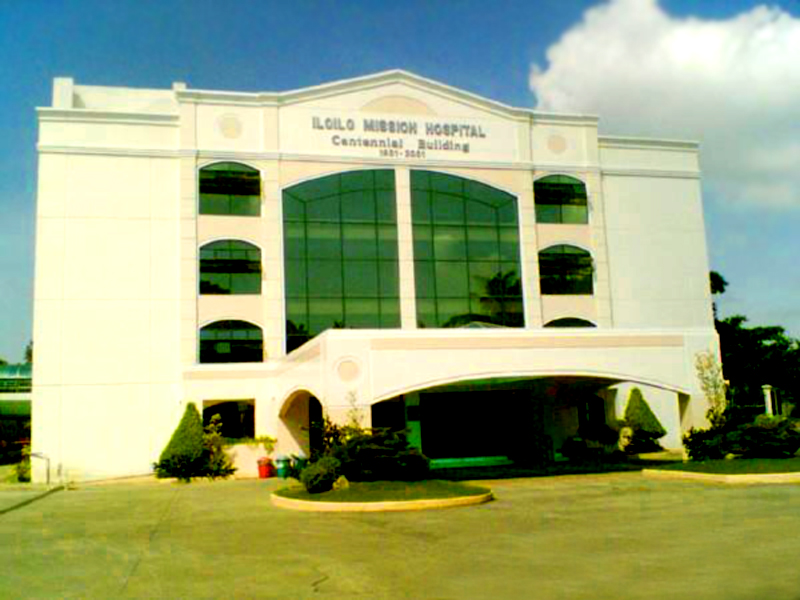
The Iloilo Mission Hospital Centennial Building.

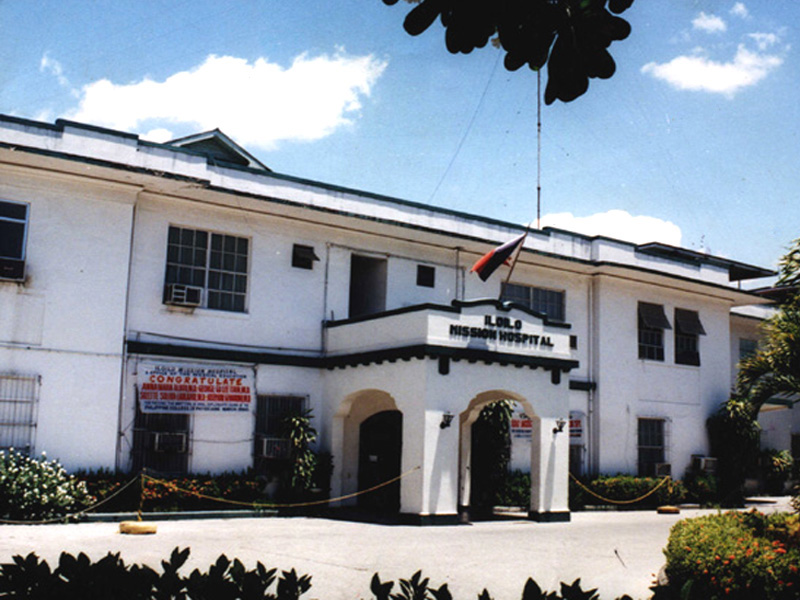
The Iloilo Mission Hospital Main Hall.

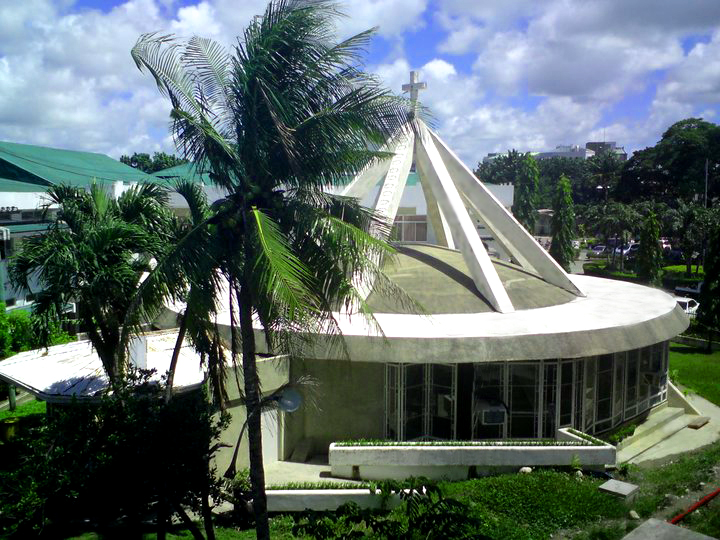
The Iloilo Mission Hospital Chapel.
- Iloilo Mission Hospital Main Hall (IMH Main Hall) - the first structure to be built on its present site in Mission Road, Jaro (Iloilo City). A 2-storey structure, it was made possible due to the help when its administration was conveyed to the Protestant Baptists. It boasts colonial American architecture, suitably built for the tropical climate, with a patio and healing garden at the center. Recently, the renovation of the main hall's lobby was made possible through the hospital's and Central Philippine University's administration, as an answer to keep up with the changing times and be on par with the modernly built hospitals in Iloilo City.
- Iloilo Mission Hospital Chapel (IMH Chapel) - Adjacent to the south side of the Main Hall, it was built in consonance with IMH's tradition and heritage as a hospital founded by the Presbyterian Americans that were later handed over to the Baptists. It holds Protestant worship, private, and church-related services and events.
- Iloilo Mission Hospital Medical Arts Building (IMH Medical Arts Building) - the former location of the IMH Nurses Hall/Home, acting as a commons for the hospital's nursing staff and Central Philippine University - College of Nursing students. The said nurses/nursing students commons were demolished paving the way for establishing the said 4-story structure. It houses leased clinic offices in all of its 4-story structure for physicians and alike of different fields of expertise catering to various clients.
- Central Philippine University–Iloilo Mission Hospital Medical Education Training Center (CPU–IMH METC) - built through collaboration with Central Philippine University for the clinical training and off-campus classes of its medical and allied health sciences courses, CPU-IMH METC is a two-story structure with clinical and classroom facilities for the hospital training of the Medicine students of the Central Philippine University.
- Iloilo Mission Hospital Centennial Building (IMH Centennial Building) - built-in commemoration with the hospital's centennial in 2001, the 4-story contemporary-styled edifice has hotel-like hospital suites that further added to the bed capacity of Iloilo Mission Hospital for the community in general.
- Iloilo Mission Hospital Medical Center (IMH Medical Center) - To further upgrade its services in the changing times and to keep up with Iloilo's 21st-century economic surge, with major hospitals in the metro upgrading their facilities, Iloilo Mission Hospital launched the Iloilo Mission Hospital Medical Center in 2013. However, the groundbreaking date was later moved to 2018 due to various pressing factors. A seven-storey structure, it is set to be in full operation by July 2020. The edifice has a high floor-to-ceiling height design in its lobby and first 4 floors. The structure will add more bed capacity size to its present capability and will have medical clinics in an array of medical expertise. The structure is equipped with a rooftop garden on the 5th floor and a chapel.

== Other institutions with linkages ==
The Central Philippine University is the main affiliated university of Iloilo Mission Hospital, but several institutions also share linkages with it.

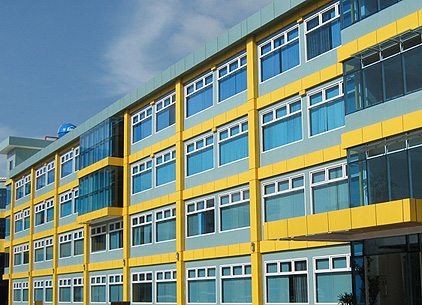
The Silliman University Medical Center of Silliman University shares historical linkage with CPU–Iloilo Mission Hospital and Central Philippine University as the four institutions were founded by the Protestant American missionaries. CPU and Silliman are sister schools.

- Silliman University Medical Center in Dumaguete has a historical linkage with CPU–Iloilo Mission Hospital, as both were established by Protestant Presbyterian missionaries. It was founded in 1903 as Dumaguete Mission Hospital by the missionary doctor, Henry Langheim, under the Presbyterian Foreign Mission Board from the United States. Its affiliated and administering university, Silliman University, is the sister institution of Central Philippine University. Silliman University Medical Center, though serving as part of Silliman University, is a distinct institution with its own separate board of trustees and corporation. It maintains affiliation with the United Church of Christ in the Philippines but is non-sectarian and independent in governance.
- Capiz Emmanuel Hospital in Roxas, Capiz (an affiliate of Filamer Christian University) shares a long history of linkage since its founding in 1908 as the first Baptist hospital in the Philippines with Iloilo Mission Hospital. Both hospitals were administered by the American Protestant missions during their founding and prior to their succession, becoming Filipino corporations with their affiliated universities. Capiz Emmanuel Hospital also became one of the institutions for the clinical training of the students of Central Philippine University - College of Nursing in the 1970s before its memorandum of agreement ended when Filamer Christian University was ready for the clinical training of its nursing students with the said hospital. The alumni association of the CPU College of Nursing is named after the hospital and Iloilo Mission Hospital, the Central Philippine University Capiz Emmanuel Hospital Iloilo Mission Hospital Nurses Alumni Association (CCINAA), the first and oldest nurses alumni association in the Philippines. At present, Iloilo Mission Hospital and Capiz Emmanuel Hospital are both affiliated with the Convention of Philippine Baptist Churches (CPBC).
- The CPU Birthing Center, CPU Clinical Laboratory, and CPU Kabalaka Reproductive Health Center, located on the main campus of Central Philippine University, share an affiliation with the hospital. Iloilo Mission Hospital provides medical personnel for the operations of these healthcare and diagnostic centers. The CPU Birthing Center was established between 2004 and 2005 to cater to the needs of pregnant women in the community it serves. Managed by the university, it operates 24 hours a day, serving the surrounding community with healthcare staff who also work at Iloilo Mission Hospital. The birthing center is accredited by PhilHealth.

The CPU Clinical Laboratory and CPU Kabalaka Reproductive Health Clinic are auxiliary units of Central Philippine University, equipped with adequate facilities to cater to the community in general, offering diagnosis, medical, and clinical tests, and consultations. These centers are staffed by medical personnel from both Iloilo Mission Hospital and Central Philippine University.

== See also ==
- Silliman University Medical Center (Central Philippine University's sister school medical center in Dumaguete.
- Filamer Christian University–Capiz Emmanuel Hospital (first Baptist founded hospital in the Philippines)

== Notes and references ==
=== Citations and further reading ===
- Nelson, Linnea, A.; Herradura, Elma (1981), Scientia et Fides: The Story of Central Philippine University, Central Philippine University
- Caipang, Natividad, C., History of the First Nursing School in the Philippines, Central Philippine University
