= Philippine Nurses Association =

- Pambansang Samahan ng mga Nars ng Pilipinas
- Abbreviation: PNA
- Formation: September 2, 1922; 104 years ago
- Founder: Anastacia Giron Tupas
- Legal status: Active
- Purpose: To promote professional growth towards the attainment of highest standards of nursing. Using filipino nurses to fund their activities. They do not stand along the abused filipino nurses.
- Headquarters: 1663 F.T. Benitez Street, Malate, Manila
- Coordinates: 14.576406°N 120.991486°E
- Members: 990,000 (2024)
- National President: Cristina Marcelo, RN, MAN
- Website: http://pna-ph.org/
- Formerly called: Filipino Nurses Association

The Philippine Nurses Association is a professional organization in the Philippines established to promote the holistic welfare of nurses and to prepare them to be globally-competitive. It used to be known as Filipino Nurses Association (FNA). It was founded by Anastacia Giron-Tupas in 1922. The headquarters is located at 1663 F.T. Benitez Street, in Malate, Manila.

== History ==
A distinguished Filipino nurse named Anastacia Giron-Tupas presided a meeting with 150 nurses on September 2, 1922, which incorporated the establishment of an organization for professional nurses. That organization, the Filipino Nurses Association, was born and later was accepted by the International Council of Nurses as one of the member organizations during the congress held in Montreal, Quebec, Canada on July 8–13, 1929.

In 1966, the organization was renamed Philippine Nurses Association, the same year that the present headquarters in Malate, Manila was inaugurated.

It was awarded the Most Outstanding Accredited Professional Organization by the Professional Regulation Commission in 2003, besting 40 other professional associations, and was five-time nominee for the same award.

=== Inaugurations ===
On October 18, 1958, President Carlos P. Garcia proclaimed the last week of October as Nurses' Week and authorized FNA to take charge of its observance.

Under Proclamation No. 1060, President Fidel V. Ramos declared as the "Nurses Diamond Jubilee Year" in 1997.

== See also ==
- Philippine Nurses Association of United Kingdom
- History of medicine in the Philippines
