= Central Philippine University Junior High School =

Private high school in Iloilo City, Philippines

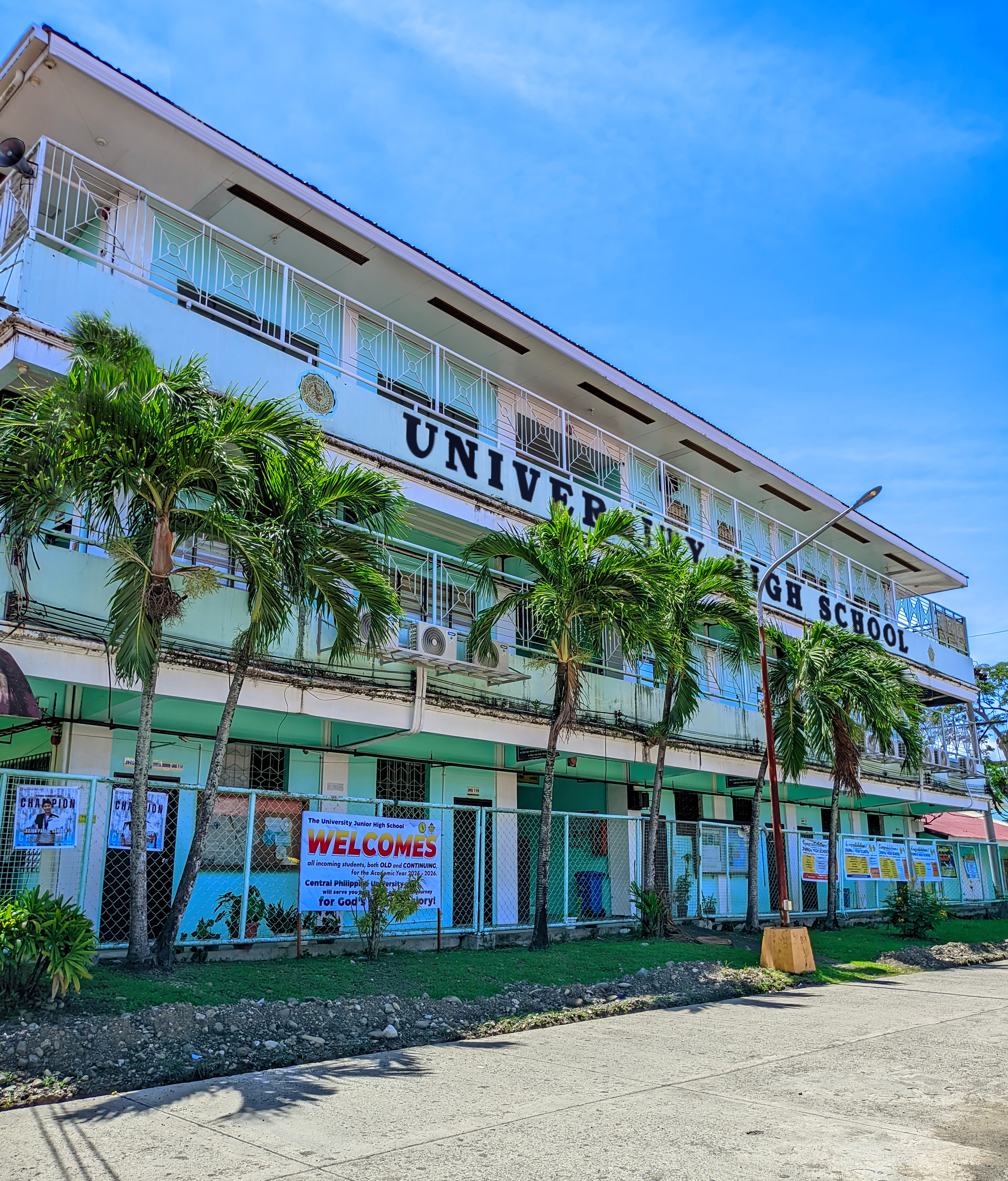

Location
- Jaro, Iloilo City, Iloilo; Philippines; 10°43′49″N 122°32′56″E

Information
- Type: Private Christian (Protestant) Coeducational Junior High School
- Motto: Scientia et Fides (Latin); Knowledge and Faith (English)
- Established: 1913
- Founder: William Orison Valentine
- President: Rev. Dr. Ernest Howard B. Dagohoy,D.Min., M.Div.
- Principal: Charlett B. Dianala, B.Th., M.Div.
- Faculty: ~ 100
- Grades: 7 to 10
- Enrollment: 1, 296
- Campus: Barangay Road, Central Philippine University, Jaro, Iloilo City
- Colors: Orange; White
- Athletics: PRISAA, ISSA and UNIGAMES
- Nickname: CPUJHS Jaguars
- Accreditation: PAASCU, ACSCU
- Newspaper: Central High Echo
- Affiliation: In covenant with the Convention of Philippine Baptist Churches (CPBCI) but independent and non-sectarian
- Varsity Team: CPU JHS Jaguars
- Website: cpu.edu.ph/junior-high-school

Central Philippine University Junior High School (formerly Central Philippine University Development High School and Central Philippine University High School), also referred to as CPU Junior High School or CPU JHS, is a private high school located in Jaro, Iloilo City, Philippines, constituting as one of the academic units of Central Philippine University.

Central Philippine Junior High School at present maintains its Level III accreditation status, the first high school in the Western Visayas to attain the said level of accreditation and one of the first three high schools in the Philippines to do so. The school is also one of the fifteen Network High Schools in the Philippines serving as a division leader school of the Engineering and Science Education Project to implement instructional leadership in science education in Western Visayas region. The high school offers 2 classes: the special science class and the regular class.

The university's establishment of Senior High School department in accordance with the K-12 program of the national government led to the CPU High School being renamed as CPU Junior High School in 2016.

== History ==
The University Junior High School was established in 1913 eight years after the Jaro Industrial School, the Central Philippine University's precursor established, by William Orison Valentine, an American missionary working under the auspices of the American Baptist Foreign Mission Society.

== Academic programs ==
Concurrently, the CPU Junior High School offers a complete grade 7 to 10 junior secondary basic education levels in regular and special science classes.

- 7 to 10 (Regular Class)
- 7 to 10 (Special Science Class)

Furthermore, CPUJHS offers a 9 subject curriculum of Filipino, English, Mathematics, Science, Araling Panlipunan, TLE, MAPEH, Values Education, and Computer. All subjects are conducted four times a week with the exception of Mathematics (being 5 times a week) and Computer (only 2 times a week).

All subjects have a designated Subject Area Coordinator who manages the subject, its events, and its faculty members.

CPUJHS also has the unique feature of offering the subject of Araling Panlipunan in English rather than in Filipino.

== Facilities ==
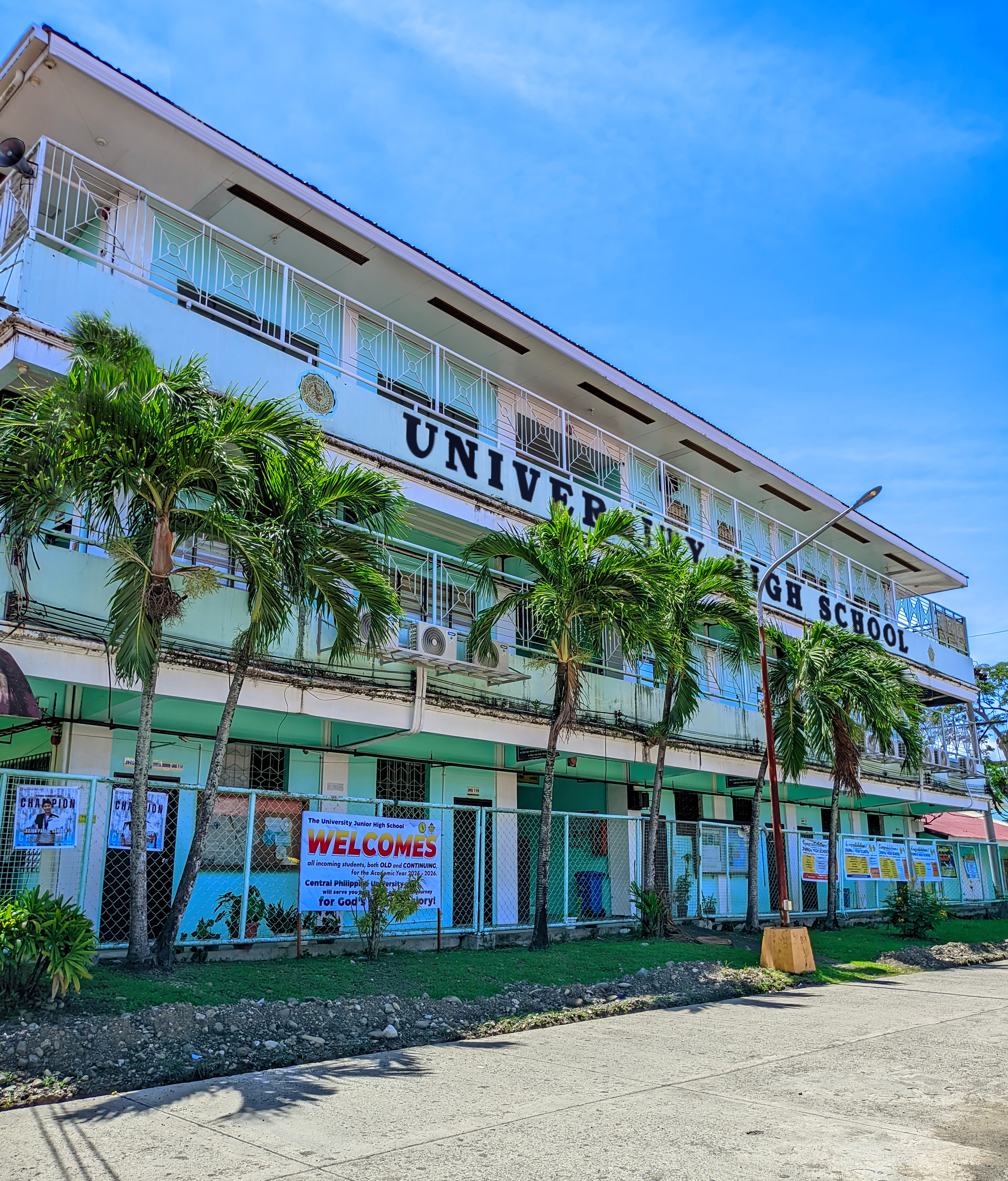
The New Junior High School Building donated by the High School 1953.

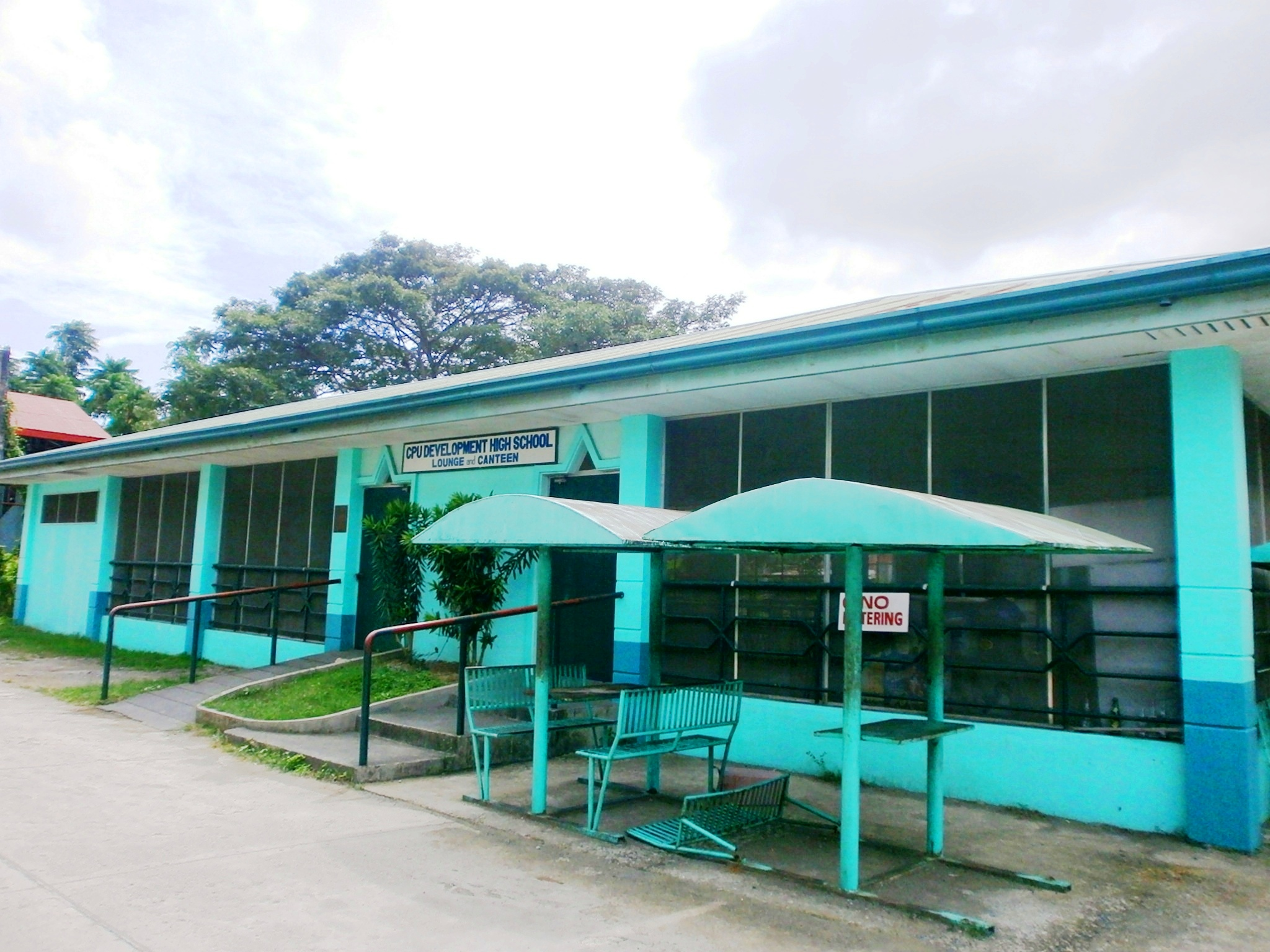
The CPU Junior High School canteen and lounge.

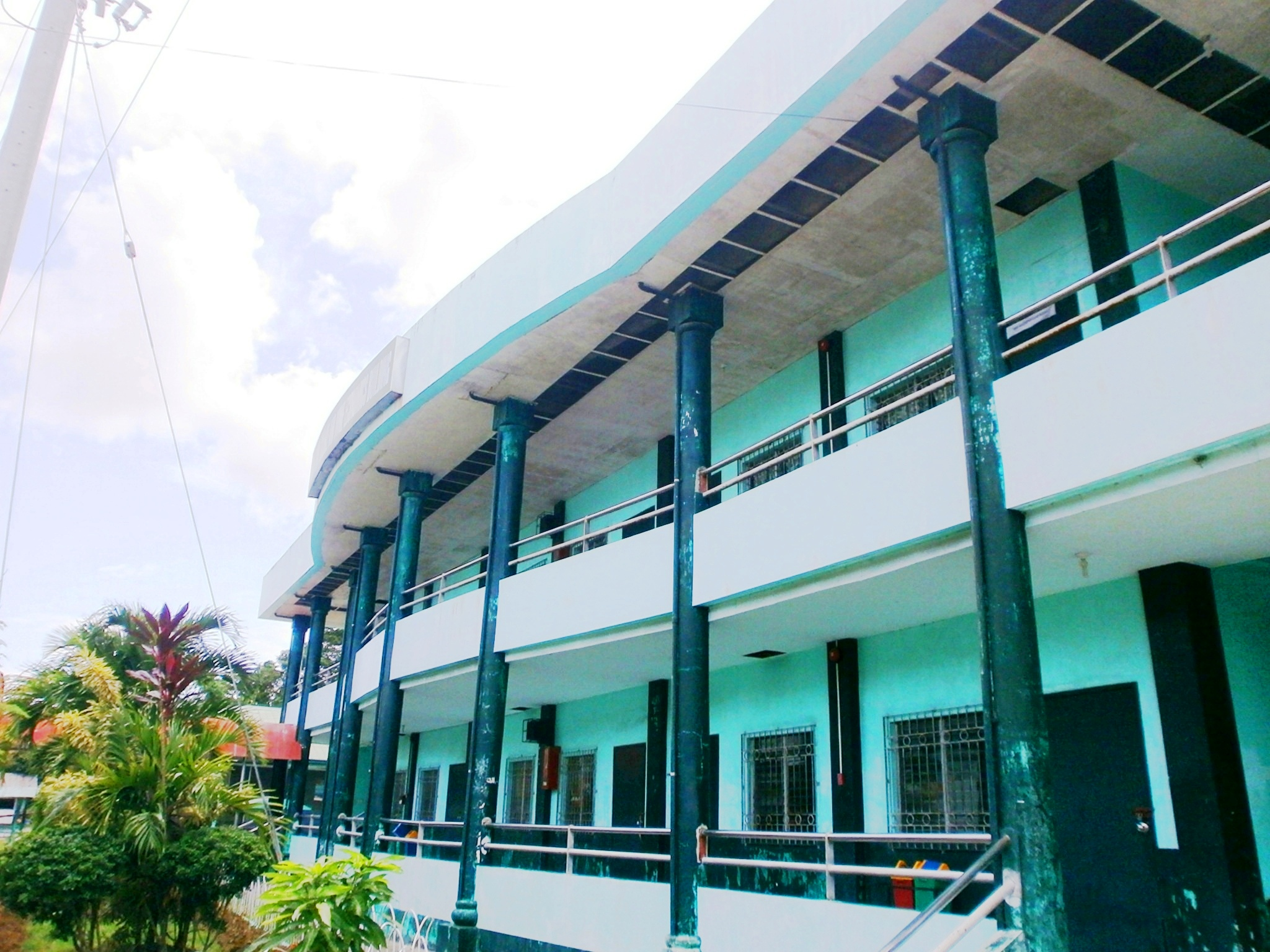
The Junior High School Science Building completed in 2005.

The CPU Junior High School has an adequate educational facilities in accordance with its continued vision as a modern junior secondary education school grounded on Christian and scientific teachings.

The present junior high school compound in the property in the main campus the old CPU Shop stands, is a donation of the CPU High School Class 1953 as an answer to the school's growing students population demand that resulted for the university to have a new location for its expansion. CPU High School was previously located at Mary J. Thomas Hall which is now occupied by the CPU College of Computer Studies.

The junior high school compound is composed of the 3 storey CPUJHS Main Building interconnected to a two and one storey structures which houses primarily the school's lecture rooms for Physical Education, Social Sciences, Mathematics, Filipino, English, Statistics, and Values Education. Part of the structure includes the principal's office, faculty rooms, junior high school speech laboratory, computer laboratory and the Junior High School Library, the CPUJHS Guidance and Counseling Center, the junior secondary education departmental library of the CPU Library System; the two storey CPUJHS Science Building (formerly CPUHS Science and H.E. Building); the CPUJHS Gymnasium; the CPUJHS Shop Building in the school's main compound proper houses lecture halls for technology education under the Technology and Livelihood Education subject; the CPUJHS Music and Physical Education Building; the one storey CPUJHS Home Economics Building; and the CPUJHS Canteen and Lounge, the cafeteria of the school. Students lockers are organized and found in hallways and the locker shed built by the CPU Junior High School Parents and Teachers Association.

== Notable alumni ==
The CPU Junior High School has a duly established alumni association subsequent to the CPU Alumni Association. The school has produced thousands of graduates since it was established in 1913 as an organics secondary education unit of the university. It has produced alumni who became notable in their fields of service which include:

- Felix Tiu - Chinese-Filipino entrepreneur and business magnate.
- Ferjenel Biron - Congressman and author of Cheaper Medicines Bill
- Jovelyn Gonzaga - Volleyball player who played during the SEA GAMES
- Custodio J. Parcon Jr. - Brigadier General

== Footnotes ==
=== Further reading ===
- Nelson, Linnea, A.; Herradura, Elma (1981), Scientia et Fides: The Story of Central Philippine University, Central Philippine University
