= Central Philippine University – College of Business and Accountancy =

Business school at Central Philippine University

Central Philippine University College of Business and Accountancy
- Pamantasang Sentral ng Pilipinas Kolehiyo ng Negosyo at Akawntansya
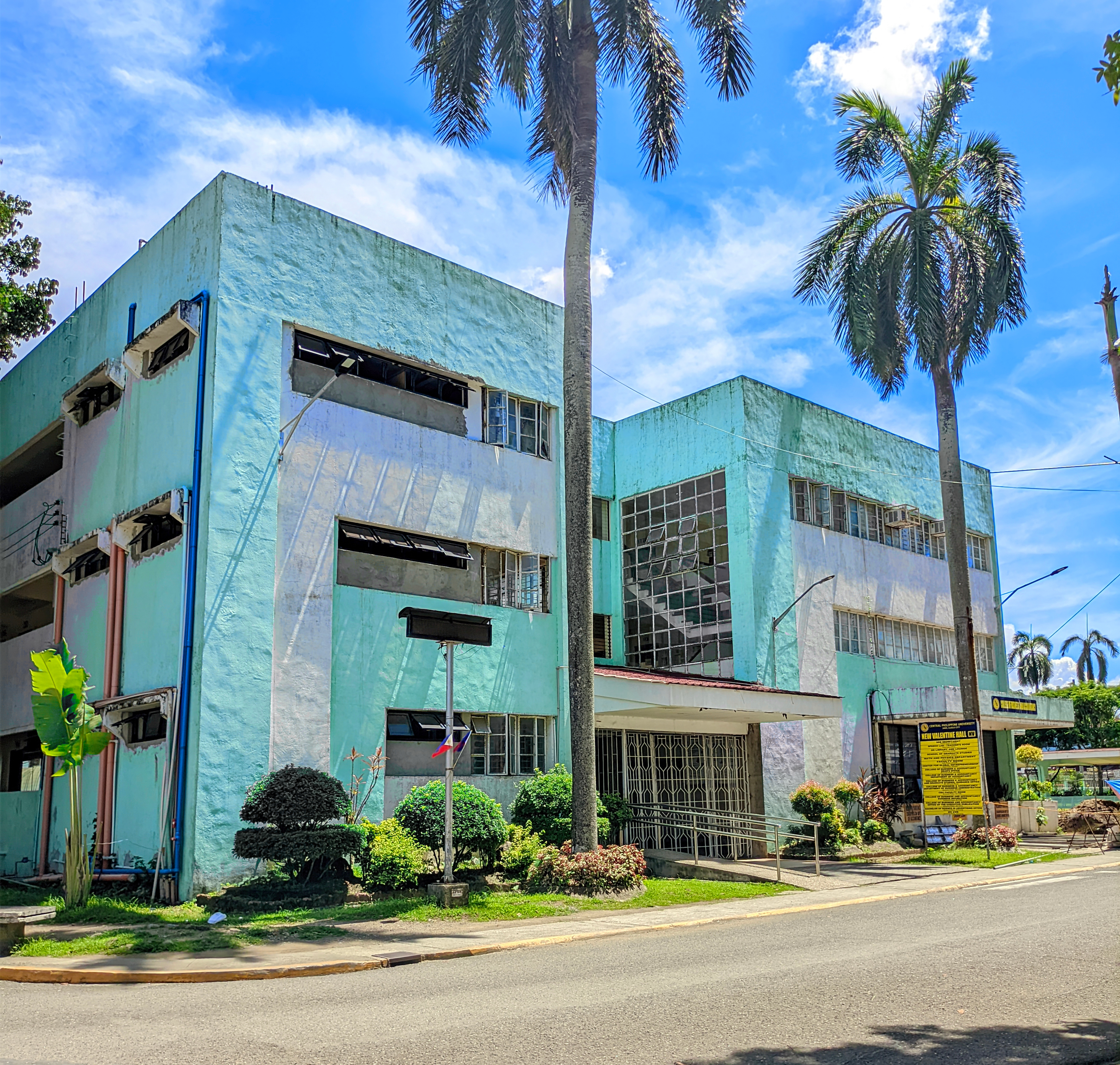
- New Valentine Hall of the CPU College of Business and Accountancy
- Former names: Central Philippine College – College of Commerce; Central Philippine University College of Commerce
- Motto: Scientia et Fides
- Motto in English: Knowledge and Faith
- Type: Private research business school
- Established: March 1935
- Academic affiliations: ACSCU-ACI
- President: Ernest Howard B. Dagohoy, D.Min., M.Div. (18th President of Central Philippine University)
- Dean: Lorna T. Grande, CPA, Ph.D.
- Location: Jaro, Iloilo City, Iloilo, Philippines; 10°43′49″N 122°32′56″E
- Campus: 59.30 acres (24.00 ha)
- Nickname: CPU CBA Phoenix
- Website: cba.cpu.edu.ph
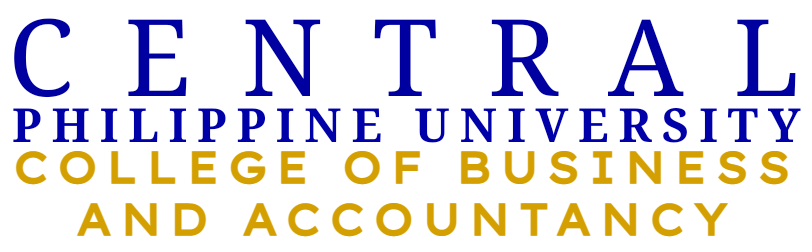

The Central Philippine University College of Business and Accountancy (also referred to as CPU CBA, CPU College of Business and Accountancy or CPU Business and Accountancy), is one of the academic units of Central Philippine University, a private university in Iloilo City, Philippines.

Established in 1935, it became CPU College of Commerce in 1953. Between 2004 and 2006, it became CPU College of Business and Accountancy.

The CPU College of Business and Accountancy offers baccalaureate programs in Accountancy, Accounting Technology, Advertising, Business Management, Financial Management, Human Resource Management, Marketing Management, Entrepreneurial Management, Management Accounting, and Real Estate Management. In the graduate and post-graduate levels, it offers Master of Business Administration and Doctor of Management programs through collaboration with the CPU School of Graduate Studies.

The CPU College of Business and Accountancy is the only business school in Western Visayas designated by the Commission on Higher Education (Philippines) as National Center of Excellence in Business Administration. Likewise it has also been accredited Level IV by the Association of Christian Schools, Colleges, and Universities (ACSCU).

== History ==
Founded in 1935 as the College of Commerce, it is one of the leading business schools in the country on the national performance of accountancy, real estate and civil service board exams; designations; accreditations; and notable alumni it produces.

The CPU College of Business and Accountancy has been designated by the Commission on Higher Education (Philippines) as National Center of Excellence in Business Administration.

An undergraduate degree granting school, the academic programs it offers include Accountancy, Accounting Technology, Advertising, Business Administration, Entrepreneurship, and Real Estate Management.

The school's programs has been accredited Level III and IV by the Association of Christian Schools, Colleges and Universities (ACSCU-ACI). The school likewise offer post-graduate professional business programs through the CPU School of Graduate Studies. Its Master of Business Administration (MBA) program has been adjudged as one of the best MBA programs in the Philippines.

The college maintains overseas academic programs jointly being offered in the universities and colleges in China and Vietnam the university has partnerships with. The Vietnamese higher learning institution of Thai Nguyen University of Economics and Business Administration is a fine example that has produced graduates abroad in the undergraduate programs of Accountancy and Business Administration.

== Academic programs ==
The CPU College of Business and Accountancy confers baccalaureate and post-graduate academic programs in accounting and business studies. A National Center of Excellence in Business Administration by the Commission on Higher Education (Philippines) for Western Visayas, some of its academic programs has been designated LEVEL IV by notable accrediting agencies, the highest level of accreditation that can be granted to individual programs in the Philippines. All of its undergraduate programs are offered in a four-year baccalaureate curriculum, while the post-graduate studies are offered through the CPU School of Graduate Studies.

=== Undergraduate studies ===
- Bachelor of Science in Accountancy
- Bachelor of Science in Accounting Technology
- Bachelor of Science in Advertising
- Bachelor of Science in Business Administration with majors in:
  - Business Management
  - Financial Management
  - Human Resource Management
  - Marketing Management
- Bachelor of Science in Economics (defunct)
- Bachelor of Science in Entrepreneurship
- Bachelor of Science in Real Estatement Management

=== Graduate studies ===
The professional/post-graduate programs of the CPU College of Business and Accountancy are offered under the umbrella of the CPU School of Graduate Studies.

- Master in Business Administration (MBA) (non-thesis and thesis)
- Doctor of Management

== Facilities ==
The CPU College of Business and Accountancy (CPU CBA) is housed with its dean and college's offices at the New Valentine Hall, a 3-story structure. Several plans for the college to have its own building, called the CBA Building, has been conceived by its administration and alumni.

The library of the college which it share with the Central Philippine University College of Law, the CPU Law and Business Library, is now housed at the Henry Luce III Library, the main library of Central.

Athletic facilities for CPU-CBA's Physical Education subjects and sports team training of the CPU-CBA Phoenix, is held at the CPU Gymnasium, the CPU Swimming Pool, the CPU Track and Field and Big Field, CPU Tennis Courts, CPU Student Center (for Table Tennis), CPU Baseball Field, CPU Halfmoon Field, and CPU Basketball and Sepak Takraw courts.

The university's dining halls and student union halls, are where the dining and lounging facilities of the college are located, in which CPU-CBA shares with other CPU's schools and colleges.

== Notable alumni ==
- Peter Irving Corvera, Undersecretary of Department of the Interior and Local Government.
- Kaki Ramirez, Filipino actor.
- Horacio Suansing, Deputy Commissioner of Bureau of Customs (Philippines) and Sultan Kudarat 2nd District congressman.
- Estrellita B. Suansing, Nueva Ecija 1st District congresswoman.
- Louise Aurelio Vail, first winner of the Binibining Pilipinas pageant to place at Miss Universe in 1965 (a semi-finalist of the latter).
