= Central Philippine University – College of Computer Studies =

Computer school at Central Philippine University

Central Philippine University Computer Studies
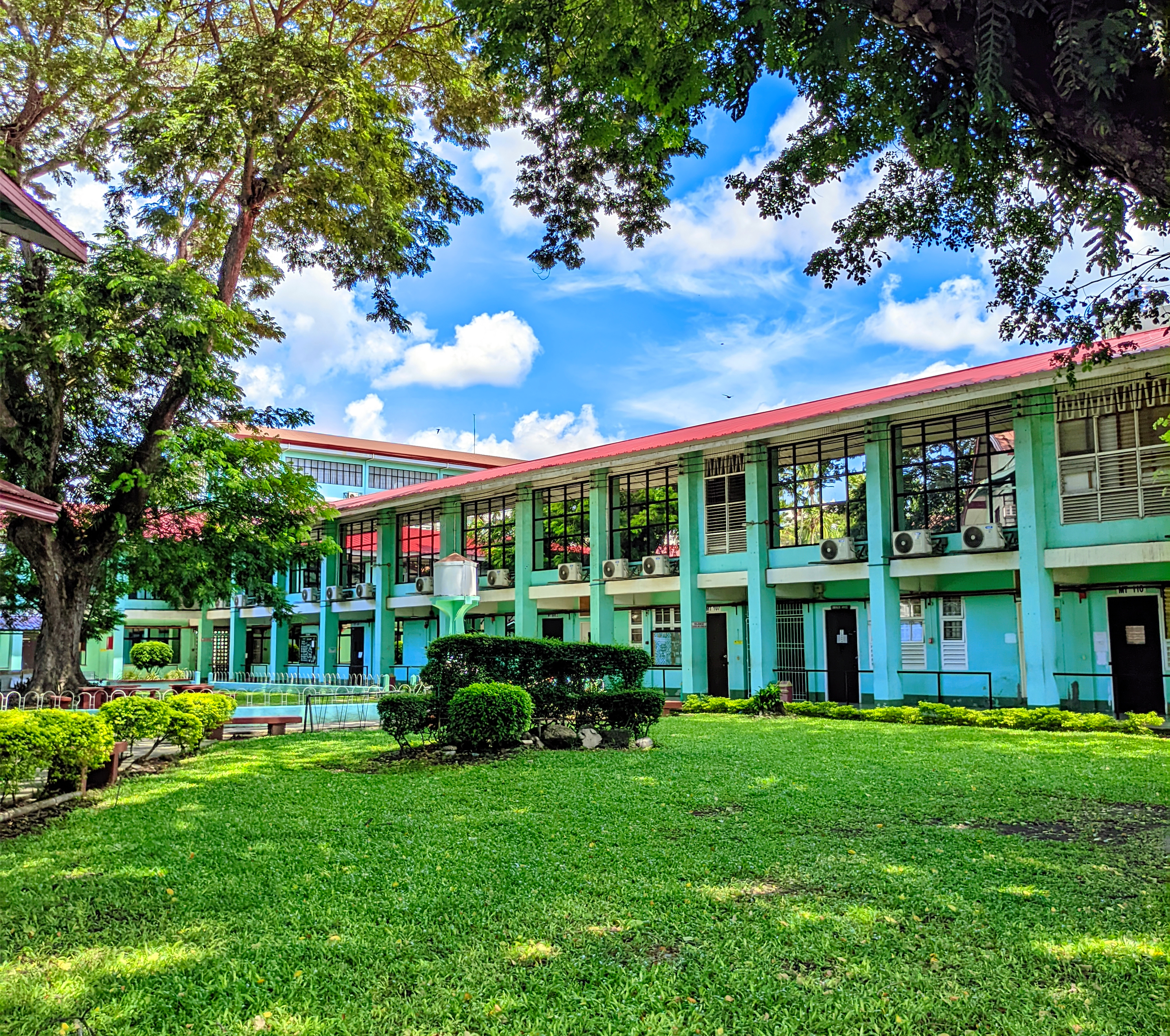
- Mary Thomas Hall of CPU College of Computer Studies
- Type: Private research computer school
- Established: 1995 (department under the College of Commerce (now College of Business and Accountancy); 2003 (college)
- Academic affiliations: PAASCU
- President: Rev. Dr. Ernest Howard B. Dagohoy, D.Min., M.Div. (President of Central Philippine University)
- Dean: Ma. Christina Qujano, B.S.C.S., M.S.C.S
- Location: Lopez-Jaena St., Jaro, Iloilo City, Iloilo, Philippines; 10°43′49″N 122°32′56″E
- Nickname: CPU CCS Warriors
- Website: www.cpu.edu.ph/college-of-computer-studies
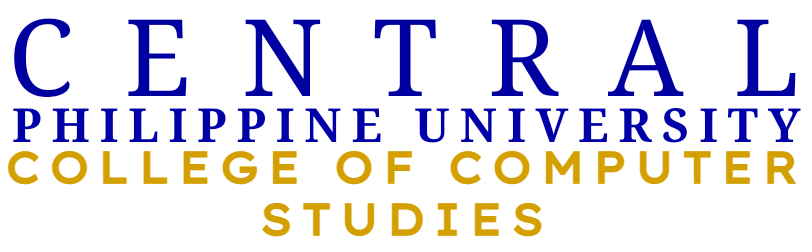

The Central Philippine University College of Computer Studies, also referred to as CPU CCS, CPU College of Computer Studies or CPU Computer Studies, is an academic unit of Central Philippine University, a private university in Iloilo City, Philippines. Founded as a department under the Central Philippine University - College of Business and Accountancy (College of Commerce) in 1995 and a separate college in 2003, the college confers four undergraduate degrees and one graduate degree. CPU College of Computer Studies has been accredited Level II by Philippine Accrediting Association of Schools, Colleges and Universities (PAASCU) in the academic programs of Computer Science, Information Systems, and Information Technology.

== Academic programs ==
The CPU College of Computer Studies is accredited with the Philippine Accrediting Association of Schools, Colleges and Universities. At present, the college confers four undergraduate degrees and one graduate degree. The Bachelor of Science in Information Technology (BSIT) program of the college is a ladderized program regulated under the Commission on Higher Education (Philippines) and Technical Education and Skills Development Authority (Philippines) (TESDA).

=== Undergraduate programs ===
- B.S. in Computer science
- B.S. in Digital media and interactive arts
- B.S. in Information technology
- B.S. in Information systems (defunct)
- B.S. in Library and information science

=== Graduate programs ===
The CPU College of Computer Studies offers masteral degrees under the CPU School of Graduate Studies.

- M.S. in Computer science

== Facilities ==
The CPU College of Computer Studies is housed in the two-storey Mary Thomas Hall. Its facilities include air-conditioned classrooms and computer laboratories.

To reinforce the college's course offerings, Central Philippine University formed partnerships with CISCO and ORACLE. The CISCO Networking Academy designation offers elective and certification courses for information technology skills for students and professionals. The college's consortium with the ORACLE Academic Initiative Partner involves the same program and initiatives on information technology it has with CISCO.

For library facilities, the Central Philippine University Library with Henry Luce III Library as the main library, acts as the college's bibliothèque. The university's athletic facilities on the other hand, serves as the institution's needs for its students Physical Education subject classes and training of its athletic team, the CPU-CCS Warriors.
