= President of Central Philippine University =

The following is a list of presidents of Central Philippine University from its founding in 1905 up to the present. The president is required by the university to be of the Baptist or any Protestant denomination:

	President	Life	Tenure	Events
1.	Reverend William Valentine	1862–1928	1905–1906; 1907–1914	Established a Bible School in the City of Iloilo (June 1905) and later the Jaro Industrial School (1905). Women were admitted to the Jaro Industrial School (1913). Both schools were founded after the succession of the Philippines from Spain to the United States through the Treaty of Paris (1898).
2.	Charles L. Maxfield	-	1906–1907	
3.	Francis Howard Rose	-	1914–1916; 1938–1941	
4.	Henry Weston Munger	-	1916–1917	
5.	Mary Jane Thomas	-	1917–1918	First female head (Principal) of Central.
6.	Alton Ezra Bigelow	-	1918–1922	
7.	Harland Francis Chandler Stuart	-	1922–1938	The Jaro Industrial School merged with the Bible School and became a junior college (Central Philippine College) (1923). Central Philippine College became a senior college (1936).
8.	R. Fred Hertling Chambers	-	1941–1942	
9.	Joseph Morris Rickey Forbes	-	1947–1950	
10.	Peter Hugh James Lerrigo	-	1950–1952	
11.	Almus Oliver Larsen	-	1952–1956; 1957–1961	Central Philippine College was given a university charter from the Philippine government (1953).
12.	Linnea Agnes Nelson	-	1956-1957; 1965-1966	The first female president of Central.
13.	Joseph Turner Howard	-	1961–1965	The last long line of Baptist missionary, white (European) and American presidents.
14.	Rex Divinagracia Drilon	-	1966–1971	The first Filipino and alum to be president (1966). The Filipinization of Central where the university properties was turned over by the American Baptist Foreign Mission Society to the Filipinos (1968)
15.	Agustin Aguilar Pulido	-	1971–1996	The first president associated with the Presbyterian Church. He became also the president of Silliman University.
16.	Juanito Maca Acanto	-	1996–2008	The first lawyer by profession president.
17.	Teodoro Canillas Robles	-	2008–2023	First President by Electrical Engineering profession and Fourth Filipino President.
18.	Ernest Howard Dagohoy	-	2023–Present	First Pastor President and Fifth Filipino President.

Note: Postwar (1945-1947) heads - Urbano F. Nequin (Postwar Reopening Managing Committee: Chairman, Registrar) and May A. Coggins (Faculty Council: Chairman) are not included.
