= Central Philippine University Library =

Library system of the Central Philippine University

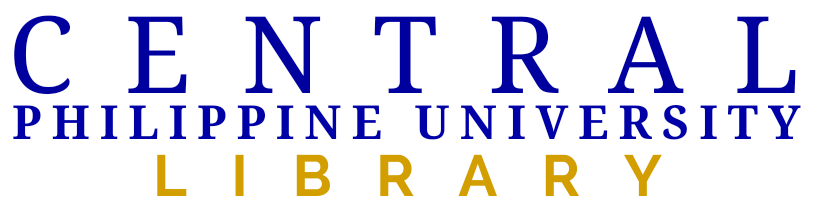

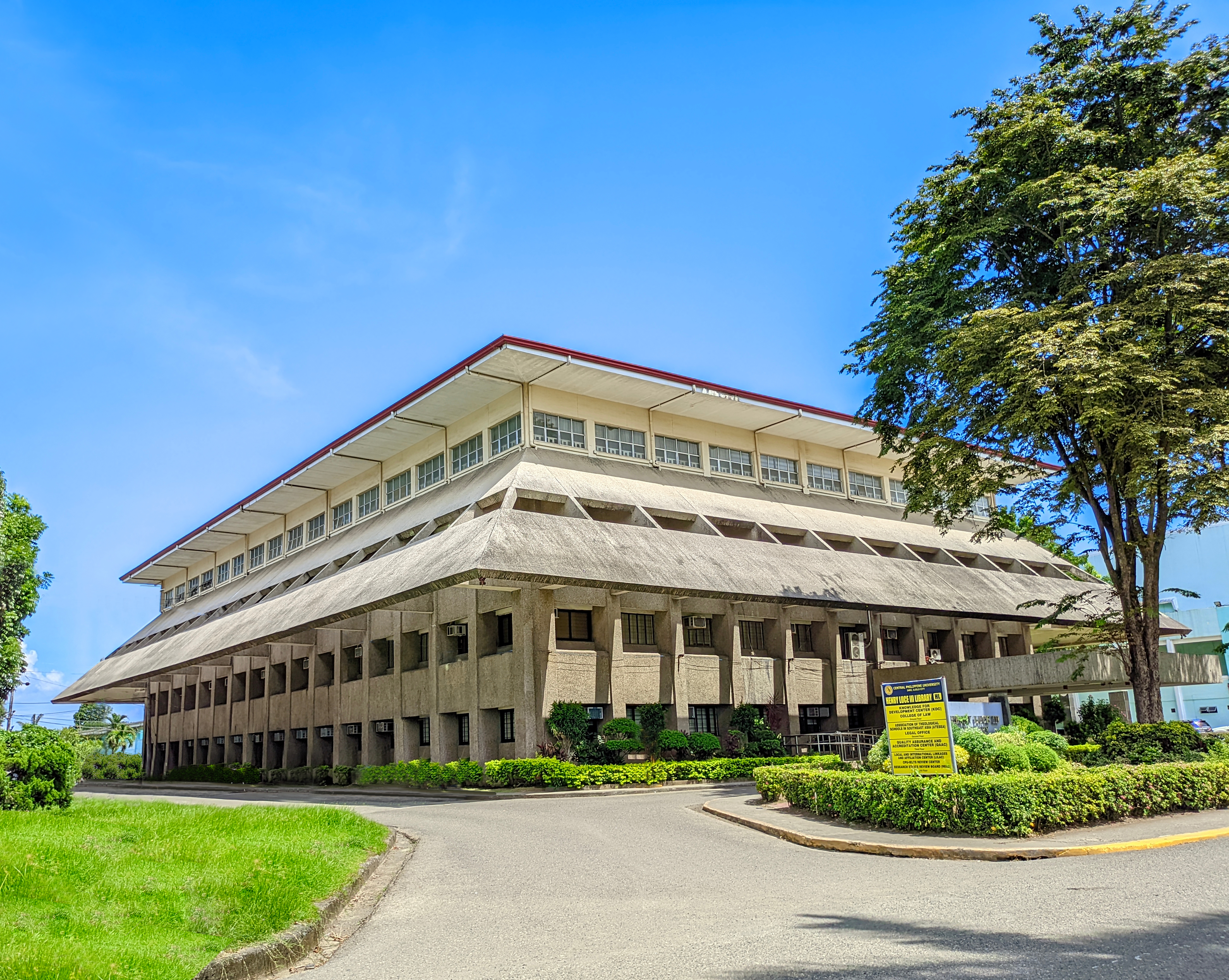
- Henry Luce III Library (Main Library)
- 10°43′49″N 122°32′56″E
- Location: Central Philippine University, Jaro, Iloilo City, Philippines, Philippines
- Type: Library system, Academic library
- Established: 1910

Collection
- Items collected: books, journals, newspapers, magazines, maps, rare books, atlases, microforms, United Nations and Second World War documents, sacred music and archaeological artifacts collections
- Size: 250,000+ volumes

Other information
- Website: library.cpu.edu.ph

The Central Philippine University Library (commonly referred to as CPU Library) is the library system of the Central Philippine University in Iloilo City, Philippines. Established in 1910, it is one of the largest academic and research libraries in the Philippines (largest library in Western Visayas) at present with more than 250,000 volumes or holdings, including special collections categorized into sections which include 40,000+ United Nations Documents, American Studies Resource Center (American Corner), Meyer-Asian Collection, Food and Agriculture Organization and Elizabeth Knox Sacred Music Collection. Rare collections of Second World War documents and Asian archaeological artifacts are also found in the collection of the main library.

The Henry Luce III Library, the main library which encompasses the library system's departmental libraries, was constructed in 1991 through the Henry Luce Foundation in honor of Henry Luce III, the elder son of the founder and editor-in-chief of Time Inc.

The Central Philippine University Library has been designated by the Philippine National Statistics Office as National Statistics Office (Philippines) (NSO) Information Center for Western Visayan region, and a depository of the United Nations and the Food and Agriculture Organization (FAO). The library is also a regular recipient of library materials from international and local organizations and centers such as the United Nations Educational, Scientific and Cultural Organization (UNESCO), Population Council in New York, National Library of the Philippines in Manila, Australian Centre for Publication Acquired for Development (ACPAD), Population Information Network, and the International Rice Research Institute (in Los Baños, Laguna, Philippines).

Through the library system’s American Studies Resource Center (ASRC) or American Corner, the first of its kind in Visayas which is located in the main library (Henry Luce III Library), is also a regular recipient from the: Thomas Jefferson Information Center in Manila (one of the 13 such centers in the Philippines), and the United States Information Service. The Henry Luce III Library's American Studies Resource Center (ASRC) helps/assists students who want to study in the United States through its Educational Advising Program.

A Knowledge for Development Center for Western Visayas, donated by the World Bank in consortium with the university was launched in 2008. The CPU–World Bank Knowledge for Development Center is one of such centers which are hubs for dialogue and research on development issues established by the World Bank in key cities around the country in partnership with leading state and private universities.

The library system at present, maintains accord with the libraries of Silliman University, the sister institution of Central Philippine University, and the Trinity University of Asia.

The Hinilawod Epic Chant Recordings, listed in the UNESCO Memory of the World Register and housed at the Henry Luce III Library, are the first documentary heritage to receive such recognition outside Manila.

== Library System ==
The Central Philippine University Library System is composed of the Henry Luce III Library (Main Library) and the local libraries of the College of Law, Junior High School, Senior High School and the Elementary School. The libraries for College of Theology and the School of Graduate Studies, formerly housed at Johnson Hall and the Alumni Building, respectively, are now housed at the Henry Luce III Library. The main library building has a seating capacity of 1,000 persons, High School Library 150; the Elementary Library, 125, and the College of Law, 42. The total seating capacity of the University Libraries at present is 1,320. At present, the University Libraries have a total holding of about 236,307 (250,000+) pieces of print materials distributed at the different sections of the three storey Main Library and the departmental libraries. The library system's maintains accord with the Silliman University and the Trinity University of Asia libraries.

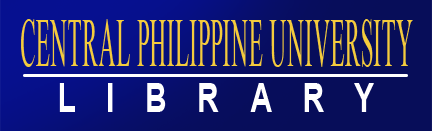
The Central Philippine University Library Banner.

=== Holdings ===
The main library holding volumes include the Graduate Studies, Theology and the Special Collections. The Elementary Library has 30,071 volumes, the High School library has 20,024, and the College of Law Library, 6,108 accessioned volumes.

Periodicals. The Library maintains subscriptions to both local and foreign print periodicals as well as subscription to ONLINE journals (OVID Medline), 8 local newspapers and more than 1,200 irregular titles or serials acquired through/from library linkages. In addition, the library receives 1,315 titles through exchanges and through gifts from local and foreign institutions. Other titles come as free mails, from here and abroad, although these are irregular. All in all, the library receives a total of 1,191 periodical titles excluding the Theology Library holdings. The Theology Library maintains and subscribes to 38 foreign and local publications. 25 titles come as gifts from Baptist World Alliance, World Council of Churches and friends of the Library.

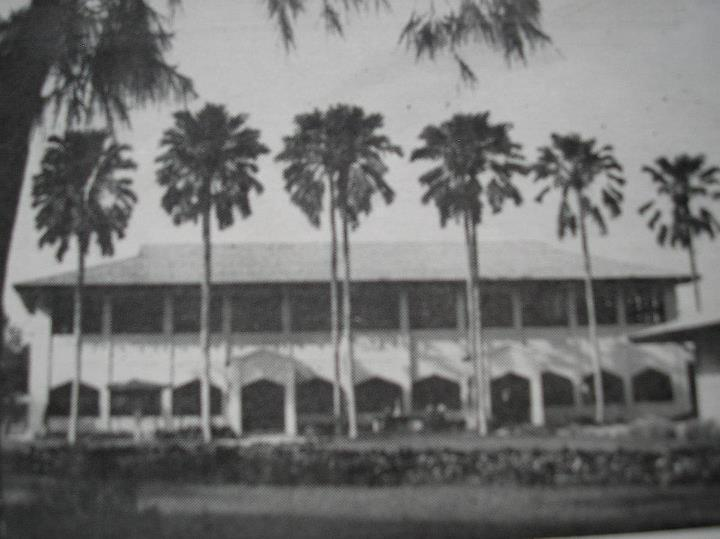
The Eugenio Lopez Hall serves as the old main library of the University until a new modern structure, the Henry Luce III Library was built to replace it. It now houses the university's College of Law. (Photo taken in 1960s)

The Henry Luce III Library follows the Library of Congress Classification and the subject headings are based on the Library of Congress Subject Headings. The Junior High School and Elementary Library follows the Dewey Decimal Classification. The library holdings may be searched online through the Online Public Access Catalog (OPAC), Destiny Online Catalog.

=== Linkages ===
The CPU Library is a depository of United Nations and the Food and Agriculture Organization (FAO) of the United Nations; a recipient of library materials from the United Nations Educational, Scientific and Cultural Organization (UNESCO); the Population Council in New York City; the National Library of the Philippines in Manila, and Australian Center for Publication Acquired for Development (ACPAD), Population Information Network, and the International Rice Research Institute, Los Baños, Laguna, Philippines; The Thomas Jefferson Information Center in Manila, and the United States Information Agency are regular library donors for the CPU - American Studies Resource Center (ASRC). The American Studies Center through its Educational Advising Program help/assist students who want to study in the U.S. Individual donors and alumni continue to assist in the development of library collection.

Starting April 29, 1997, the National Statistics Office (Philippines) (NSO), Region VI designated Central Philippine University Library as National Statistics Office (Philippines) (NSO) Information Center. The Graduate Studies Library houses the National Statistics Office (NSO) publications.

Library Link, Based in the Filipinas Heritage Library, Makati, Metro Manila, is an electronic union catalogue of the Filipiniana Libraries of different schools and institution in the Philippines. It makes it possible for researchers to look for materials and identify their location using only one search facility. Membership of CPU took place on May 9, 2002.

In February 1998. Central Philippine University signed a Memorandum of Agreement with Southeast Asian Ministers of Education Organization (SEAMEO)/Science and Education for Agriculture and Development (SEARCA) or Southeast Asian Regional Center for Graduate Study and Research in Agriculture as one of the centers for information. In May 2000, the University started the library interconnection with Silliman University and Trinity University of Asia, and launched its Web-Online Public Access Catalog (Web-OPAC).

The Academic Libraries Book Acquisition System Association, Inc. (ALBASA) facilitates information on new books by conducting Books Fairs & Seminar Workshops. It also facilitates orders for library supplies of member schools at lower prices. The CPU Library as one of the incorporating members, has been with ALBASA since the early 1970s.

=== Library Staff ===
At present the University Libraries are managed by the Director of Libraries, with professional librarians, Computer Technician and library secretary and more than 148 student assistants under the University Work-Study Services Program.

=== Library Services ===
The University Libraries serve its academic clientele through the Main Library and its departmental libraries. The three-storey Main Library houses the general circulation books, theology materials, serials, and the special collections. The Library maintains the following Special Collections: Filipiniana Collection, Meyer-Asian, Government Publications, United Nations, and FAO publications, World War II Panay Guerrilla Documents, American Studies Resource Center, Microforms, the Music Collection and University Archives (Centraliana) in the Henry Luce III Library; the Children's Literature and the curriculum Collection at the Women's Studies Collection and Seminar Extension in the Theology library; Elementary Library; and the Braille and the Vocational Collection at the High School Library.

Access to INTERNET is available in the Cyber Library and CD-ROMs at the General Reference and Graduate Studies Section. The Library also offers Electronic mail (E-mail) services and online access to Health Research and Development Information Network (HERDIN), PCHRD, Department of Science and Technology, in Taguig, Metro Manila and SEAMEO in Los Baños, Laguna. Starting January 24, 2000 the Library users use the Online Public Access Catalog (OPAC) to search for 1980-1999 publications and in November 2000, library holdings below 1980's become accessible through OPAC.

The University Libraries maintain its inter-library services with the school and the academic libraries in the region as well as with the other libraries in the country. It also maintains formal consortium on science materials with three universities in the city of Iloilo and on medical sciences with CPU–Iloilo Mission Hospital, the university hospital of CPU.

In August 2020, the library launched its online virtual assistant BERTHA, to cater its clients including university personnels, staffs, faculties, students and non-CPU alumni or guests.

=== World Bank-Knowledge Development Center Partnership ===
The World Bank launched its 11th Knowledge for Development Center in the campus of Central Philippine University (CPU) in Jaro, Iloilo City on September 26, 2008.

The Knowledge for Development Centers (KDCs) are hubs for dialogue and research on development issues established by the World Bank in key cities around the country in partnership with leading state and private universities.

The ten other Knowledge for Development Centers (KDCs) are located in Mindanao (University of Southeastern Philippines in Davao, the Western Mindanao State University in Zamboanga, and the Notre Dame University in Cotabato), the Visayas (Silliman University in Dumaguete City and University of San Carlos in Cebu City), and Luzon (Saint Paul University Philippines in Tuguegarao, Asian Institute of Management in Makati, Ateneo de Naga University in Naga, Palawan State University in Puerto Princesa, and at the World Bank Office in Pasig).

Housed on the ground floor of CPU’s Henry Luce III Library, the Knowledge for Development Center offers the following services for free:

- Participation in forums, discussions, and programs on development issues;
- Access to development-related publications by well-known academic and development institutions;
- Room use and online access to World Bank project documents, publications and reports;
- Internet access to development and research sites;
- Webcam and videoconferencing;
- A special collection of Compact Discs and videotapes on development issues;
- Online access to the Global Jolis catalogue system that allows users to download some of the collections of around 60 World Bank Public Information Centers around the world;
- Online access to the World Bank's e-Library, a subscription-based portal of over 3,000 World Bank publications and research papers;
- Copies of selected World Bank publications in the Philippines.

Also held at Central Philippine University on September 26 was a forum on building partnerships in the community and the World Bank’s regional consultation on its next Country Assistance Strategy (CAS).

Consultations for the Country Assistance Strategy (CAS) are conducted by the World Bank all over the country in order to obtain a wide range of perspectives and recommendations from government and other stakeholders, on the critical development challenges and the policy options and programs the Bank should pursue to address these challenges. The one-day workshop in Iloilo was attended by national and local government officials and representatives from non-government organizations (NGOs), peoples' organizations (POs), the academe, trade unions and the business sector from nearby areas in Western Visayas.

The World Bank prepares a Country Assistance Strategy (CAS) document for the Philippines every three or four years. The current Country Assistance Strategy (CAS) for the Philippines, with the theme Supporting Islands of Good Governance, originally covered the period 2006-2008 but was extended up to June 2009.

The next Country Assistance Strategy (CAS), which will govern the Bank's lending and non-lending programs and services for the period July 2009 to June 2012, will be submitted to the WB Board of Executive Directors early in 2009 for discussion.
