= William Valentine =

American educator

1st President of Central Philippine University
- In office 1905-1906 (First Term), 1907 – 1914 (Last Term)
- Succeeded by: Charles L. Maxfield

Personal details
- Born: William Orison Valentine; May 9, 1862 Spencer, New York
- Died: February 2, 1928 (aged 65) Bacolod, Philippines
- Resting place: The Philippine American Cemetery; Jaro, Iloilo City, Iloilo, P.H.
- Spouse: Ina Van Allen Valentine
- Education: University of Chicago; Valparaiso University; Colgate University
- Profession: University president Educator; Minister; Missionary
- Known for: Founder of the Central Philippine University (CPU)

Academic work
- Discipline: Chemistry, physics, geology

William Orison Brown Valentine (May 9, 1862– February 2, 1928) was an educator and missionary in service of the American Baptist Foreign Mission Society who established and served as the first president of Jaro Industrial School, now Central Philippine University. He ministered for some thirty years in Asia, first in Burma starting in 1895 and in the Philippines from 1904 until his death in 1928 at the age of 65.

== Biography ==
=== Early life ===
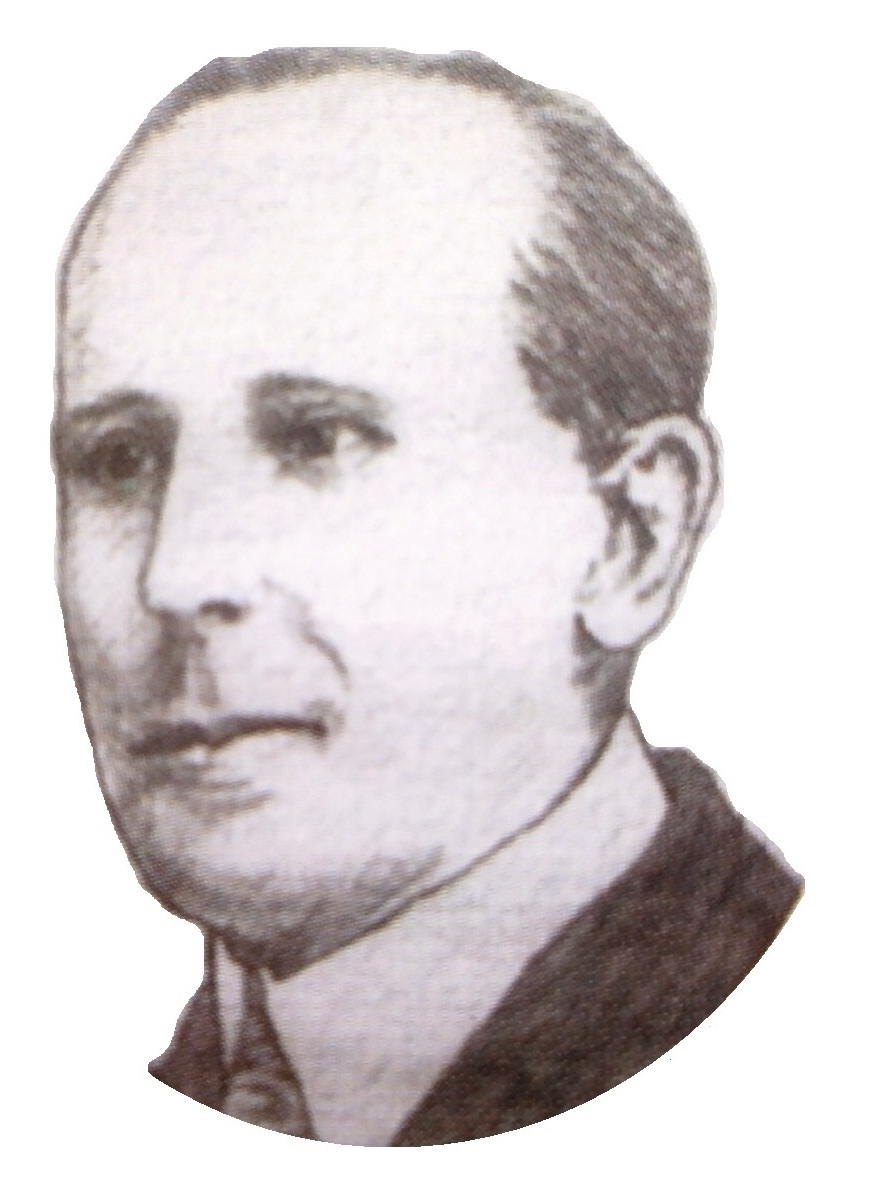
William Valentine sketched portrait.

Valentine was born in Spencer, New York on May 9, 1862, the son of William Valentine, a farmer and horse breeder and Electa Brown Valentine. After taking the normal course at Mansfield Normal School in Pennsylvania, he taught school for four years and then enrolled at the Colgate Theological Seminary. After completing his studies, he joined the American Baptist Foreign Mission Society and was sent to Burma – first in 1895 to Rangoon, then to Mandalay where he became principal of the Baptist Mission High School for Boys. During his eighth year in Burma he suffered severe sunstroke and returned to America for treatment. It was during his treatment that he met his future wife, nurse Ina Jane Van Allen.

== Missionary work in the Philippines ==
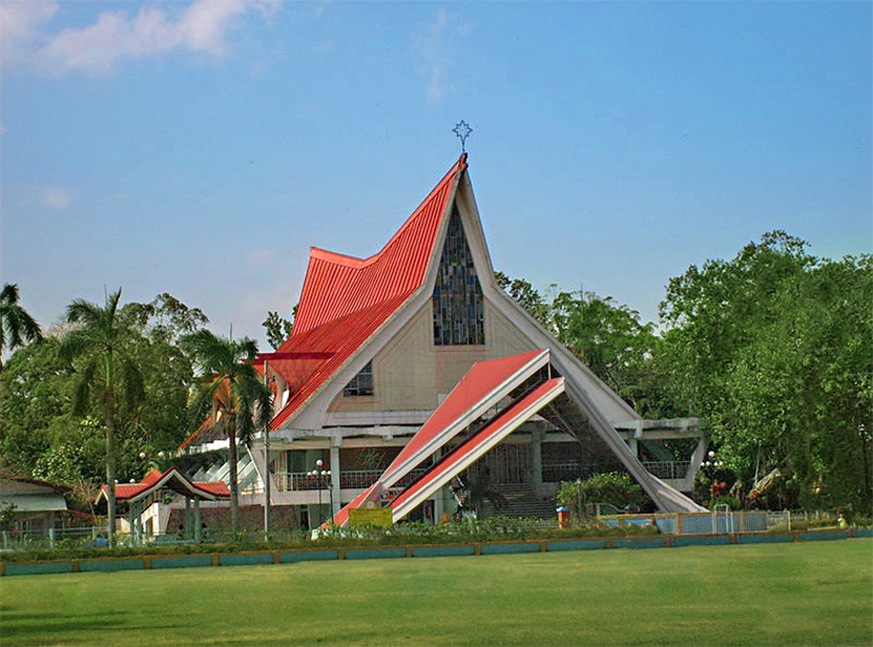
The Central Philippine University was founded by William Valentine along with his other co-founders through the grant that was given by the American philanthropist, oil magnate and industrialist, John D. Rockefeller.

=== Iloilo province ===
Valentine and Miss Van Allen were married in 1903 and the couple left for his new appointment in Iloilo in the Philippines, few years after when the country was opened to Protestant American missions in 1898. The American Baptist Mission Union had received a grant from American industrialist and philanthropist John D. Rockefeller to begin educational work in the Philippines, and the Philippine Baptist Conference voted in December 1904 to establish two schools, an industrial school for boys and a Bible school to train ministers and other Christian workers under the administration of Valentine. In the fall of 1905 the Jaro Industrial School was opened as a free vocational boarding school for boys at Jaro, in Iloilo City. The first class consisted of 20 boys who worked four hours a day to pay their tuition, room and board, and spent four hours in the classroom. One of the school's innovations was the adoption of student self-government (the first in the Philippines) known as the Jaro Industrial School Republic modeled on American civil government. The Republic continues to this day at Central Philippine University which evolved from the Industrial School over the years. By 1907 there were 300 boys working an active farm and in various trades, and the Bible school had been split off under a separate principal. Mrs. Valentine was active in school affairs and taught some courses. She also cared for the three Valentine children born in Iloilo between 1904 and 1913. In 1913 the school opened its doors to girls; it was fully incorporated by the Philippine government and enrolled 740 students. From the beginning it served poor students who could not afford schooling otherwise.

In 1914, Valentine returned to America with his family to further his studies. In America he studied at Valparaiso University, where he received a degree in education, and at the University of Chicago, where he presented a master's thesis in the department of practical theology. His thesis, Moral and Religious Values of Industrial Education, recounted the success of work-study schooling at Jaro and other schools in Burma, South Africa and India which had developed a similar philosophy of institutional self-support through the work of students.

Meanwhile, Jaro Industrial School continued to grow, and in 1953 it became Central Philippine University. In 2005, Central, had enrolled over 13,000 students at all academic levels. It currently has more than 50 academic programs and holds business and accountancy classes in Vietnam.

=== Negros Occidental province ===
With the completion of his studies in 1916, Valentine received a new appointment as Provincial Missionary for Negros Occidental, an island neighboring Iloilo in the Philippines. He and his family went to Bacolod, the capital of the province, where he assumed the pastorship of the Bacolod mission church. He built a new mission house to replace the small chapel and encouraged Filipino lay ministers to preach at Sunday services. There were also dormitories for both boys and girls who attended public schools and received a Christian education at the mission. Valentine set about to open new churches and private schools in Bacolod and throughout the province. Mrs. Valentine taught kindergarten in the Bacolod school, and both education and the ministry thrived during the eleven years that Valentine served there.

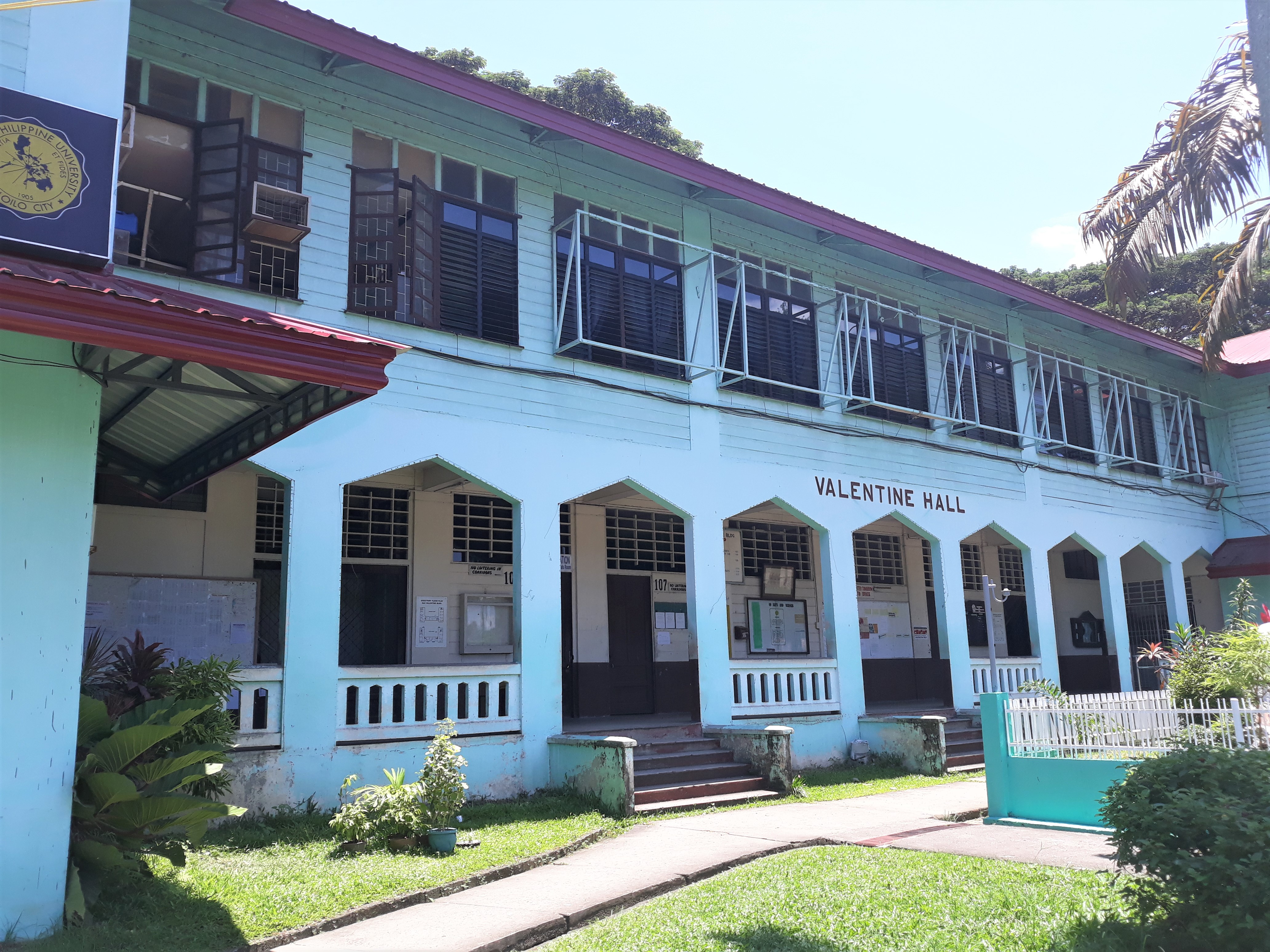
The Valentine Hall on the campus of Central Philippine University is a monument built and dedicated in memory of William Valentine.

== Death ==
On February 2, 1928, Valentine died in Bacolod of malaria complicated by heart disease and was buried at the Philippine American Cemetery in Jaro, Iloilo City. Mrs. Valentine returned to America, and bought a home offered by the Baptist Mission Society in Granville, Ohio, across the street from Denison University where all three Valentine children studied. She died on March 27, 1979, aged 100.

== Legacy ==
Filipinos remember Valentine's vital role in fostering Christian education in the Visayas. In 1969 he received a posthumous Honorary Doctorate in Pedagogy from the Central Philippine University in Iloilo City. The university honored him further on October 1, 2005, when Central Philippine University celebrated its Founder's Day with the unveiling of a bronze bust of Valentine at Old Valentine Hall. In Negros, the Bacolod Evangelical Church and the Bacolod Christian College as well as schools and missions throughout the province are outgrowths of Valentine's work.

== See also ==
- List of presidents of Central Philippine University
