= Central Philippine University College of Law =

Law school at Central Philippine University

- Pamantasang Sentral ng Pilipinas; Kolehiyo ng Batas
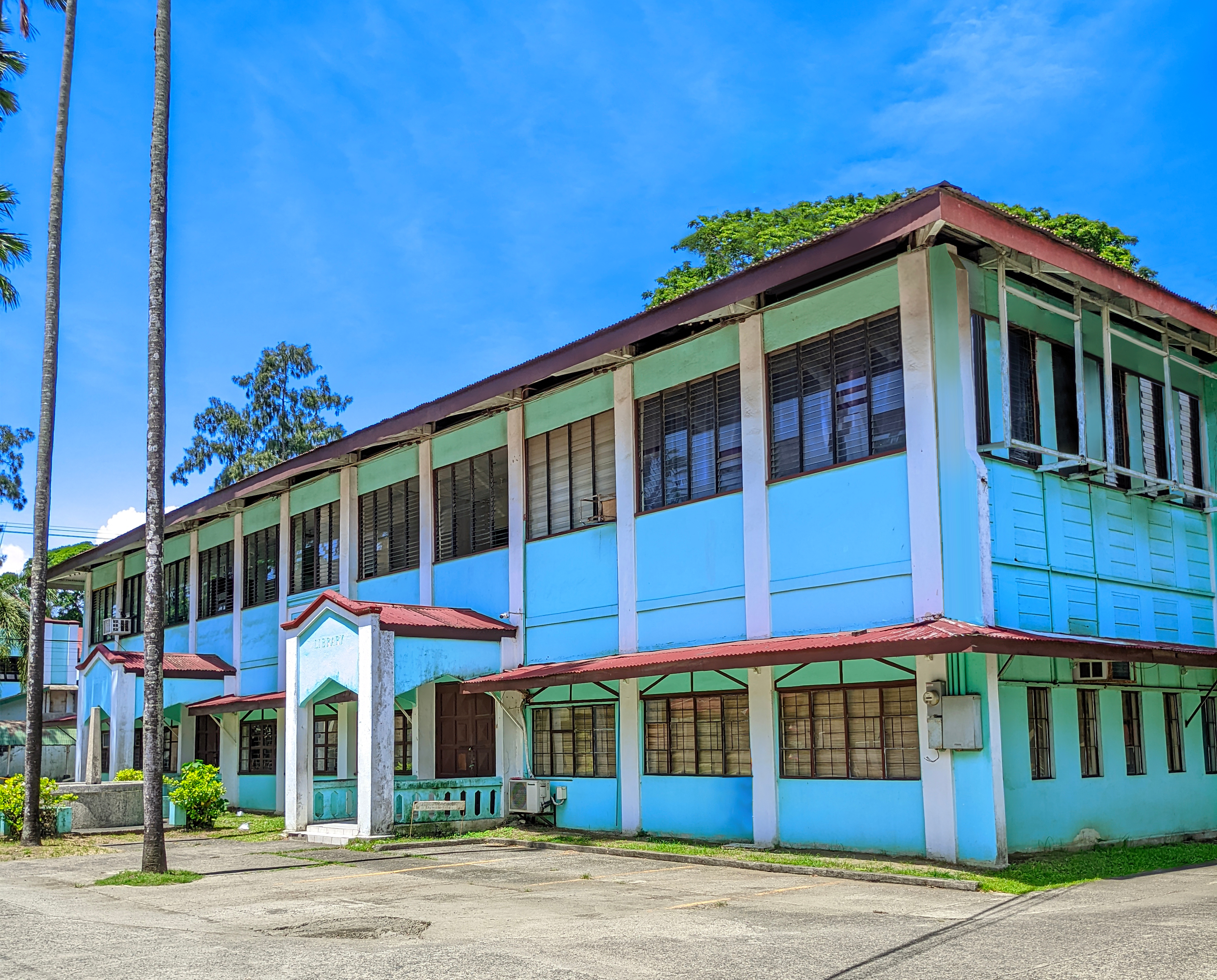
- The Eugenio Lopez Hall, one of the buildings housing the CPU College of Law.
- Other names: CPU Law Legis (CPU COL Legis)
- Motto: Scientia et Fides
- Motto in English: Knowledge and Faith
- Type: Private law school
- Established: 1939
- Academic affiliations: Philippine Association of Law Schools (PALS)
- President: Rev. Dr. Ernest Howard B. Dagohoy, D.Min., M.Div.
- Dean: Aila Rae Endonila, LL.B., LL.M.
- Location: Lopez-Jaena St., Jaro, Iloilo City, Philippines; 10°43′49″N 122°32′56″E
- Campus: 59.30 acres (24.00 ha); Central Philippine University
- Website: cpu.edu.ph/college-of-law
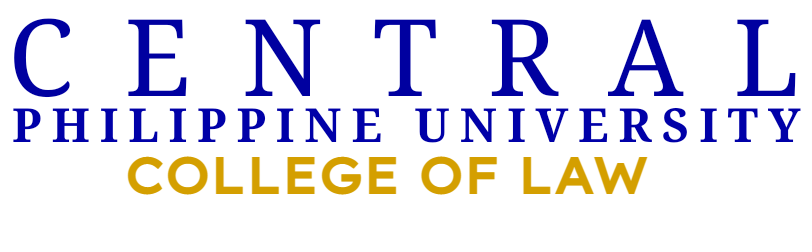

The Central Philippine University College of Law, also referred to as CPU COL, CPU College of Law or CPU Law, is the law school and one of the academic units of Central Philippine University, a private university in Iloilo City, Philippines. Established in 1939, the CPU College of Law is one of the leading law schools in the country in terms of bar exam performance, alumni it produces and linkages. In 2012, the Juris Doctor (JD) replaced the Bachelor of Laws (LLB), making it as the first law school to offer such program approved by legal education board of the Philippines.

The college entered a consortium with San Beda University - College of Law for the offering of Master of Laws (LLM) Program, the first in Western Visayas region. Graduates of the said program upon full graduation rites, don San Beda's red satin commencement exercises vestments and receives San Beda University diplomas, giving them automatic entitlement as alumni of both CPU and San Beda.

== Facilities ==
The CPU College of Law which is formerly housed at the Eugenio Lopez Hall with its office at the New Valentine Hall, temporarily sits in Henry Luce III Library.

The university's plan to put up a four to five story edifice for the College of Law is in the pipeline.

== Academic programs ==
The college offers academic programs in the field of legal studies: the Juris Doctor Program (J.D.) in lieu of the Bachelor of Laws (LLB) program and the Master of Laws (LLM) through partnership with San Beda University for those who will take continuing law education after the Juris Doctor (JD) Program.

== Notable alumni ==
- Ramon Muzones (LLB 1952) – former Iloilo City Councilor, Hiligaynon writer and National Artist of the Philippines for Literature (first Hiligaynon National Artist writer).
- Arthur Defensor Sr. (Faculty) – former Undersecretary of the Department of Education, Culture and Sports, Commissioner of the Presidential Commission on Good Government (PCGG), Congressman, and Governor of Iloilo Province.

== Footnotes ==
=== Further reading ===
- Nelson, Linnea, A.; Herradura, Elma (1981), Scientia et Fides: The Story of Central Philippine University, Central Philippine University
