= Association of Christian Schools, Colleges and Universities =

- Founded: 1946
- Type: educational, non-profit
- Region served: Philippines
- Members: 118
- Website: www.acscu.net
- Formerly called: Association of Christian Schools and Colleges

The Association of Christian Schools, Colleges and Universities (ACSCU) was established in 1946.

The members are non-stock and non-profit Protestant founded schools or institutions in the Philippines which are affiliated with Christian churches or denominations. Each includes the teaching of the Holy Bible as part of its curricula, particularly teaching that Jesus Christ is the only Incarnate Son of God. All revenues and grants received are utilized for educational services to the students.

ACSCU is a founding member of the Coordinating Council of Private Educational Associations (COCOPEA). It cooperates with the COCOPEA member associations, namely: the Catholic Educational Association of the Philippines (CEAP), the Philippine Association of Colleges and Universities (PACU), the Philippine Association of Private Schools, Colleges and Universities (PAPSCU), and the Technical-Vocational Schools Association of the Philippines (TEVSAPHIL).

ACSCU is still a growing association. At present it consists only of one hundred eighteen (118) member schools spread in 16 regions of the Philippines: six universities, three seminaries, 40 colleges, and 69 basic education schools.

== Representation ==
There are eleven (11) denominations represented in ACSCU, namely:

1. Convention of Philippine Baptist Churches
2. Episcopal Church in the Philippines
3. First Church of God
4. Independent Baptist Church
5. Interdenominational Church
6. Philippine Baptist Church
7. Philippine Independent Church
8. Seventh-day Adventist Church
9. United Church of Christ in the Philippines
10. United Evangelical Church
11. United Methodist Church
