= Ilejay =

Ilejay is a surname. Notable people with the surname include:

- Arin Ilejay, former drummer for Avenged Sevenfold
- Beatrice Ilejay Laus (born 2000), British musician known professionally as Beabadoobee
- Kathrina Ilejay-Tan, television personality at DXBC-TV
- Samantha Ilejay, former Prime Minister of Central Philippine University Republic
