= Central Philippine University Republic =

Primary governing entity of CPU's student body

- Motto: Non Sibi Sed Aliis (Latin); Not for self, but others (English)
- Institution: Central Philippine University
- Location: Jaro, Iloilo City, Philippines
- Established: 1906
- Colours: Gold and Blue
- Website: www.facebook.com/CPURepublic/

The Central Philippine University Republic (CPUR), often referred to as CPU Republic, is the student government of Central Philippine University in Iloilo City. Established in 1906 a year after Jaro Industrial School (the forerunner of Central Philippine University) opened, it is the first and oldest student council (student governing body) in South East Asia. CPU Republic is modeled on the Federal government of the United States and consists of three branches: executive, legislative and judicial.

In 2005, a new constitution was ratified that changed the form of government to a federal parliamentary style, drawing inspirations from various types of government structures like the Philippines, France, the United Kingdom, and the United States.

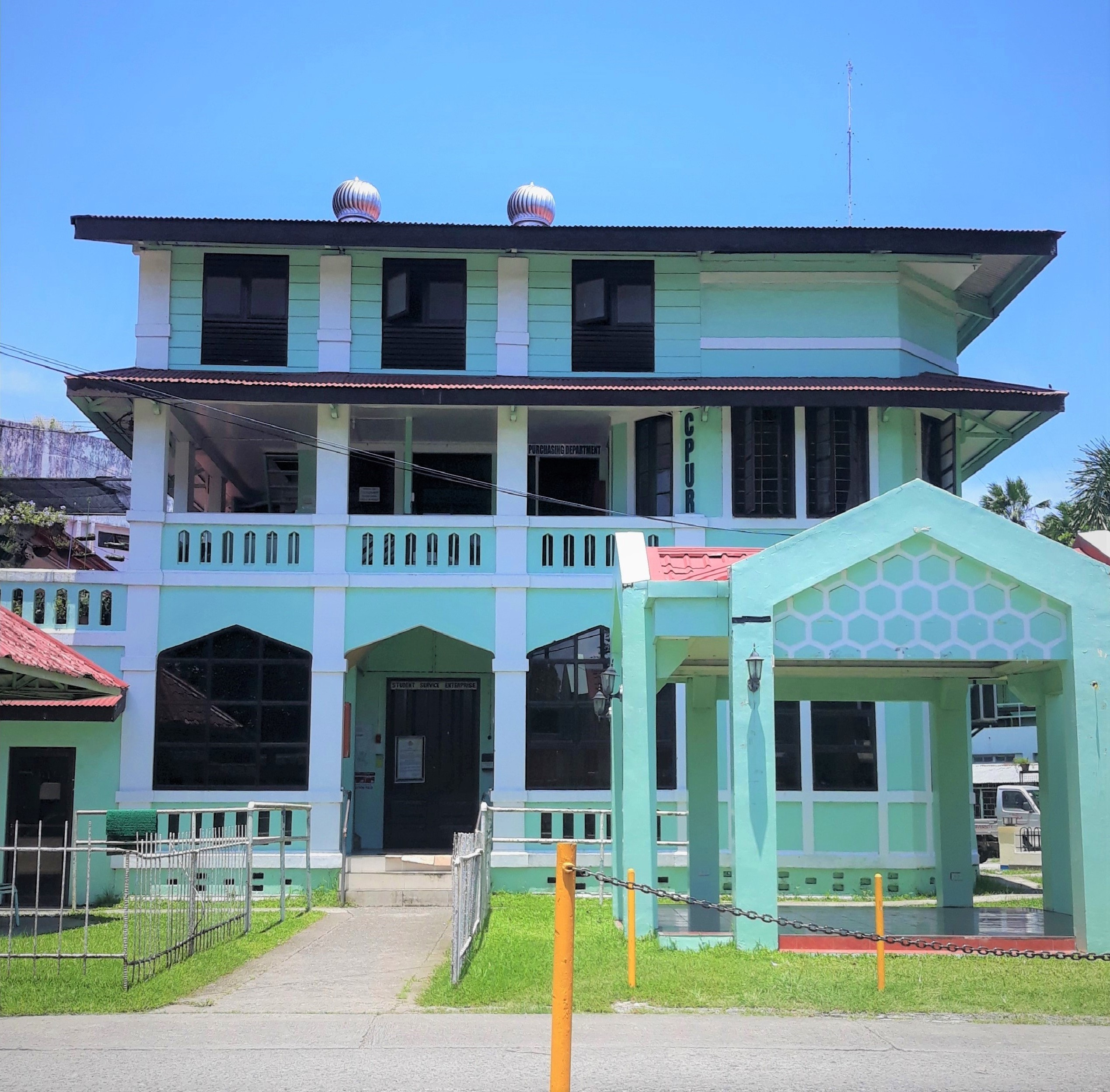
The Stuart Hall, named after the late President of the University, Harland F. Stuart, houses the Student Service Enterprise at the ground floor and the CPU Republic at the top floor.

== Structure ==
CPUR is unique among its counterparts in other universities as it operates like a real government would. It has an executive, legislative, and judicial branches.

In the current constitution, CPUR is structured in a federal parliamentary form that is composed of 16 provinces from the 16 colleges of CPU.

=== The Legislative ===
The legislative branch is bestowed upon a unicameral Parliament consisting of eight (8) senators elected at-large, and 1 representative from each province. As of today, there are 24 members of parliament (MPs): 8 senators and 16 representatives.

Only parliament has the power to create resolutions, enact laws, and approve any partnerships and major business the Republic has to undertake. Most of the issues it tries to solve are those that affects the whole Republic.

The Vice President of the Republic acts as the speaker of the house or the presiding officer every session and he/she may assign a deputy speaker chosen among the MPs.

=== The Executive ===
The executive branch consists of the Prime Minister and its cabinet. The Prime Minister, almost exclusively always chosen from the senators, is the leader of his/her political party and is chosen by the majority of the members of Parliament. He is the highest chief executive of the Republic tasked to handle its day to day operations.

The cabinet is composed of ministers, deputy ministers, and committees assigned by the Prime Minister. According to the 2017 amendments to the constitution, there should be 8 standing ministries which are: Ministry of Finance, Ministry of Local Government Units, Ministry of Scholars and Work Students, Ministry of Organizations and Fraternities, Ministry of Information, Ministry of Internal Affairs, Ministry of External Affairs and Ministry of Sports. The constitution also provides that Parliament have the discretion to add interim ministries as they deem fit for the academic year. Senators are the only MPs to become ministers.

=== The Judiciary ===
The judicial branch is bestowed upon the Supreme Court of the Republic which is composed of a Chief Justice and four (4) Associate Justices. Appointments to the Supreme Court, like the Philippine process, are made by having the Court open an application and subsequently submit a shortlist to the President for appointment to be approved by a majority of MPs.

The powers of the Supreme Court are as follows:

1. To exercise original jurisdiction over cases involving Republic officials on probation mandamus and quo warranto.
2. To render final judgment on the question of legality of the conduct of any agency or instrumentality of the Republic.
3. To formulate the Rules of Procedure concerning all judicial proceedings.

Traditionally, most Supreme Court cases are about election related cases.

=== The President ===
The President is the highest directly elected official of the Republic and serves as the representative of the Republic in the CPU Board of Trustees, as an ex-officio member. He/she has a ceremonial role and had powers not entrusted by the constitution to the Prime Minister. The President is also the one who works closely with the Administration serving as its bridge especially on policy issues. He/she is also the one who nominates student representatives (almost all comes from MPs) to the University's standing/ad-hoc committees in which he/she serves as an ex-officio in all of those committees.

=== The Vice President ===
The Vice President is the second highest directly elected official of the Republic. He/she serves as the speaker of the house in Parliament and is the presiding officer in every legislative session. A deputy speaker is also appointed by the Vice President to serve in his/her absence. In case the President dies, injured, incapacitated, or unable to perform his/her duties the Vice President shall assume the role and office of the President.

=== The Independent Commissions ===
The Republic has two (2) independent commissions as set up by the constitution. These are the Commission on Elections and the Commission on Audit.

==== The Commission on Elections ====
The Commission on Elections is composed of a Chairman and four (4) Commissioners. The following are their powers and functions.

1. Enforce and administer all laws and regulations relative to the conduct of an election, referendum and plebiscite.
2. Exercise exclusive original jurisdiction over all contests relating to the elections, returns and qualifications of all elective national and provincial CPUR officials.
3. Decide, except those involving the right to vote, all questions affecting elections, including the determination of the number and location of polling places, and appointment of election officials and inspectors.
4. Register political parties, organizations or coalitions which, in addition to other requirements, must present their platform or program of government; and accredit citizens’ arm of the Commission on Elections. Group or organizations which seek to adhere to this Constitution or the rules and regulations of this University shall be refused registration.
5. Deputize persons for the exclusive purpose of ensuring free, orderly, honest, peaceful, and credible elections.
6. Investigate and, where appropriate, prosecute cases of violations of election laws, including acts of omissions constituting election fraud, offenses, and malpractice.
7. Recommend to the Parliament effective measures to minimize election spending, including limitation of places where propaganda materials shall be posted, and to prevent and penalize all forms of election fraud, offenses, malpractices, and nuisance candidacies.
8. A free and open party system shall be allowed to evolve according to free choice of the people, subject to the provisions of this article.
9. Submit to the President and the Parliament a comprehensive report on the conduct of each election, plebiscite and referendum.

==== The Commission on Audit ====
The Commission on Audit is composed of a Chairperson and two (2) Commissioners. The Commission shall have the power, authority and duty to examine, audit and settle all accounts pertaining to the revenue and receipts of and expenditures and uses of funds and property owned by the Republic or any of its subdivisions.

=== The Local Government Units ===
The Republic is composed of its 16 provinces. Each province is composed of their own local government units headed by a Governor, with its own Vice Governor and a Provincial Board composed of eight (8) Board Members, and an array of appointed officials and staffs. As a federal state, the LGUs are guaranteed by the constitution to have their own local autonomy.

== List of CPUR Presidents, Vice Presidents, and Prime Ministers ==
Since 2005, the Republic is led by its three highest officials: the President, the Vice President, and the Prime Minister. It was recently referred to by the then former Prime Minister (17th Parliament, 2021-2022) and President (18th Parliament, 2022-2023) Danz Rasheed Reynald Quimba as a triumvirate, drawing inspiration from the two Roman triumvirates that held power twice during the late Roman Republic.

List of CPUR Presidents, Vice Presidents and Prime Ministers
| Parliament | Academic Year | President | Vice President | Prime Minister |
|---|---|---|---|---|
| Pre-Federal Parliamentary Period | 2004 - 2005 | Melissa Joan Robite (R) | Rodney Rubinos (R) | Position Not Established |
| 1st Parliament | 2005 - 2006 | Christian Cataluña (K) | Doriedelle Losañes (K) | Erwin Taleon (R) - 1st Semester Unknown - 2nd Semester |
| 2nd Parliament | 2006 - 2007 | Marvin Segura (K) | Doriedelle Losañes (K) | Unknown - 1st Semester Olufunso Oke (K) - 2nd Semester |
| 3rd Parliament | 2007 - 2008 | Karen Rey (K) | Darnel Forro (K) | Wharson Arguelles (R) - 1st Semester Joshua Misajon (R) - 2nd Semester |
| 4th Parliament | 2008 - 2009 | Joshua Misajon (R) | Wharson Arguelles (R) | Milo Ceralvo (K) |
| 5th Parliament | 2009 - 2010 | Cara Jeanne Sullano (K) | Joan Brodit (R) | Jason Gregorio (R) - 1st Semester Sierralyn Jaranilla (R) - 2nd Semester |
| 6th Parliament | 2010 - 2011 | Edgar Biñas (R) | Jason Jamora (R) | Reymar Gallego (R) - 1st Semester JD Chris Dofeliz (R) - 2nd Semester |
| 7th Parliament | 2011 - 2012 | JD Chris Dofeliz (R) | Shiela Olid (R) | Edgar Biñas (R) |
| 8th Parliament | 2012 - 2013 | Albert Jan Matthew Java (K) | Mary Grace Verga (R) | Brian Eric Cerebo (K) - 1st Semester Allen Dave Fuego (R) - 2nd Semester, Nov - Jan Marc Bedona (K) - 2nd Semester, Feb - Mar |
| 9th Parliament | 2013 - 2014 | Marc Bedona (K) | Angelo Listano (R) | Christian Stephen Legayada (R) |
| 10th Parliament | 2014 - 2015 | Brian Eric Cerebo (K) | Emily Oke (K) | Dojie Gumata (K) |
| 11th Parliament | 2015 - 2016 | Rex Marcus Sarabia (R) | Dojie Gumata (K) | Riego Ferrer Garcia (R) |
| 12th Parliament | 2016 - 2017 | Arthur Gonzalez (K) | JD Chris Dofeliz (R) | Blessed Bea Plondaya (K) |
| 13th Parliament | 2017 - 2018 | Jan Christian Española (K) | Sidrik Gotico (K) | Charles Arthel Rey (K) |
| 14th Parliament | 2018 - 2019 | John Michael Suelo (R) | Anthony Niguas (R) | Samantha Ilejay (K) |
| 15th Parliament | 2019 - 2020 | Riego Ferrer Garcia (R) | Rey Peregrino (K) | Richard Manolo (R) |
| 16th Parliament | 2020 - 2021 | Ro-anne Lozada (K) | Christian Paul Racca (K) | John Erland Pudadera (R) |
| 17th Parliament | 2021 - 2022 | Gabriel Mico Bondoc (K) | Lander Dean Alcorano (R) | Danz Rasheed Reynald Quimba (R) |
| 18th Parliament | 2022 - 2023 | Danz Rasheed Reynald Quimba (R) | Kriss Kringle Inge Bancolo (R) | Ron Xavier Caldito (R) |
| 19th Parliament | 2023 - 2024 | Mitzi Ruth Delector (R) | C-sar Mart Aguirre (R) | Emman Rey Saquibal (R) |
| 20th Parliament | 2024 - 2025 | Ron Xavier Caldito (R) | C-sar Mart Aguirre (R) | Crisfe Vergara (R) |
| 21st Parliament | 2025 - 2026 | Jellian Precious Ganda (R) | Collyn Maxie Rose Moscoso (R) | Jaylord Lampa (R) |
| 22nd Parliament | 2026-2027 | Reanna Gabrielle Guanzon (R) | Lyndon John Coronado (K) | John Lloyd Panizales (R) |
