= Central Philippine University Symphonic Band =

Marching and pep band

- School: Central Philippine University
- Location: Jaro, Iloilo City, Philippines
- Director: instructor-operated
- Assistant Director: student-operated
- Members: 60-70

The Central Philippine University Symphonic Band (Commonly referred to as CPU Symphonic Band) serves as the marching band and pep band of Central Philippine University.
