= Jaro, Iloilo City =

District of Iloilo City, Philippines

Jaro
- District of Iloilo City
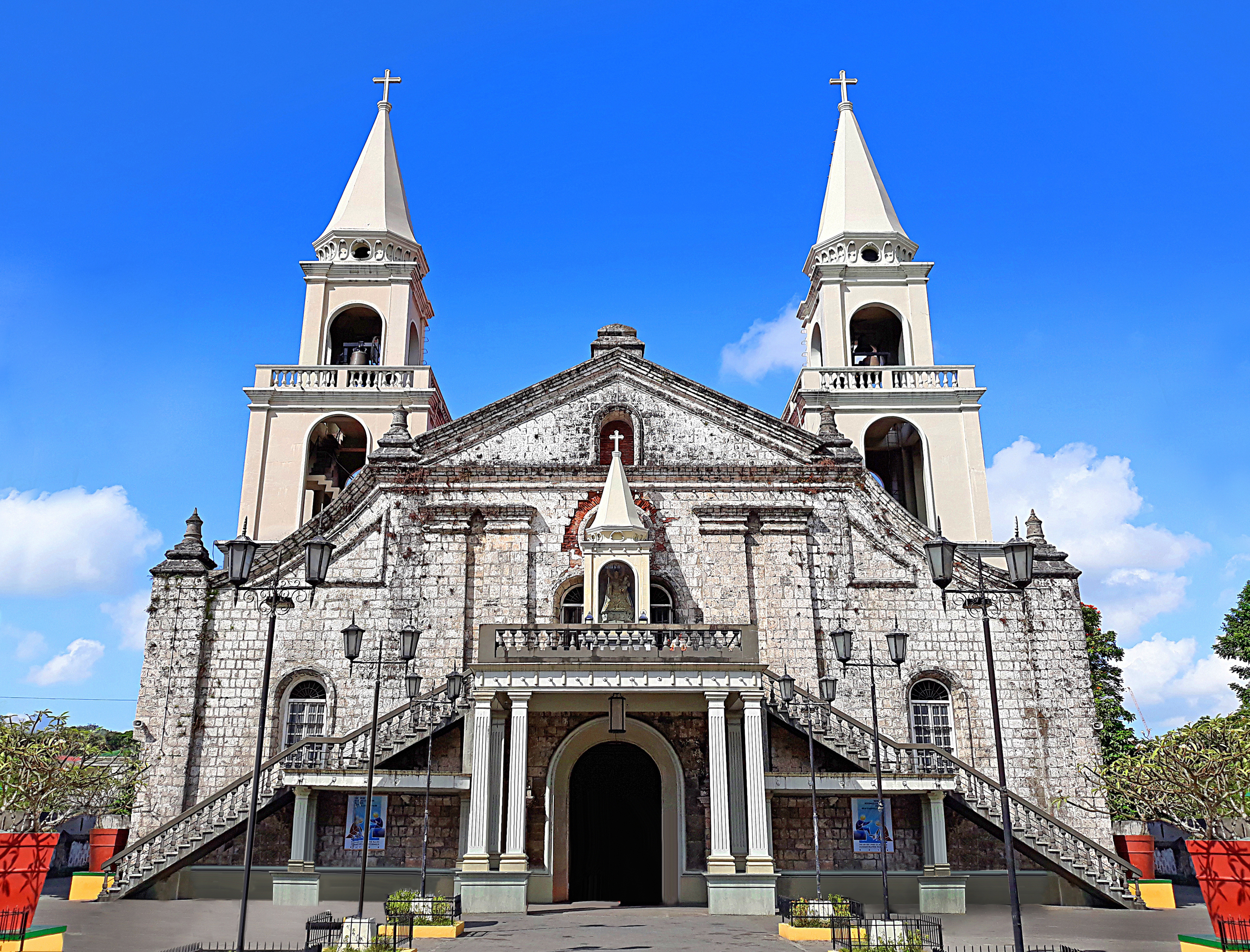
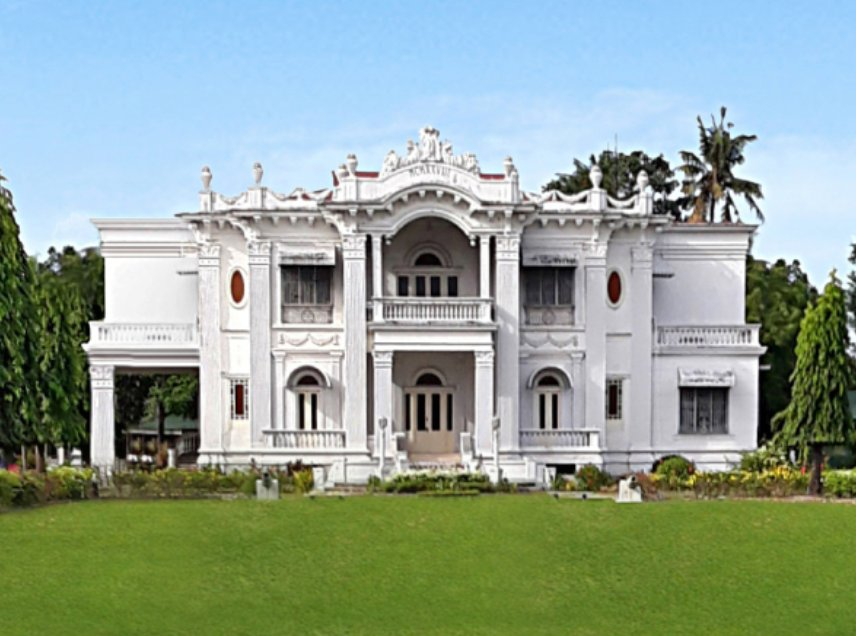
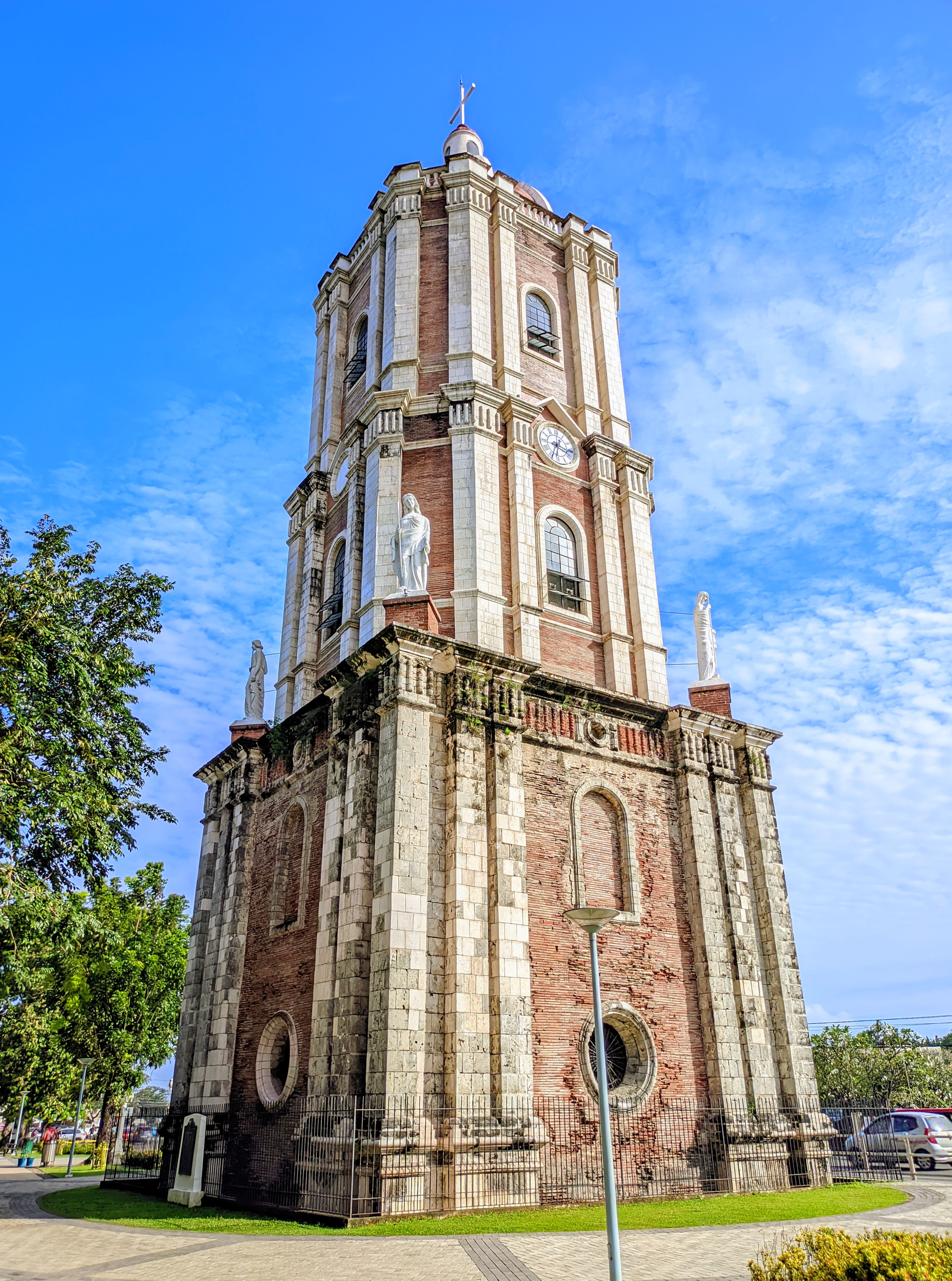
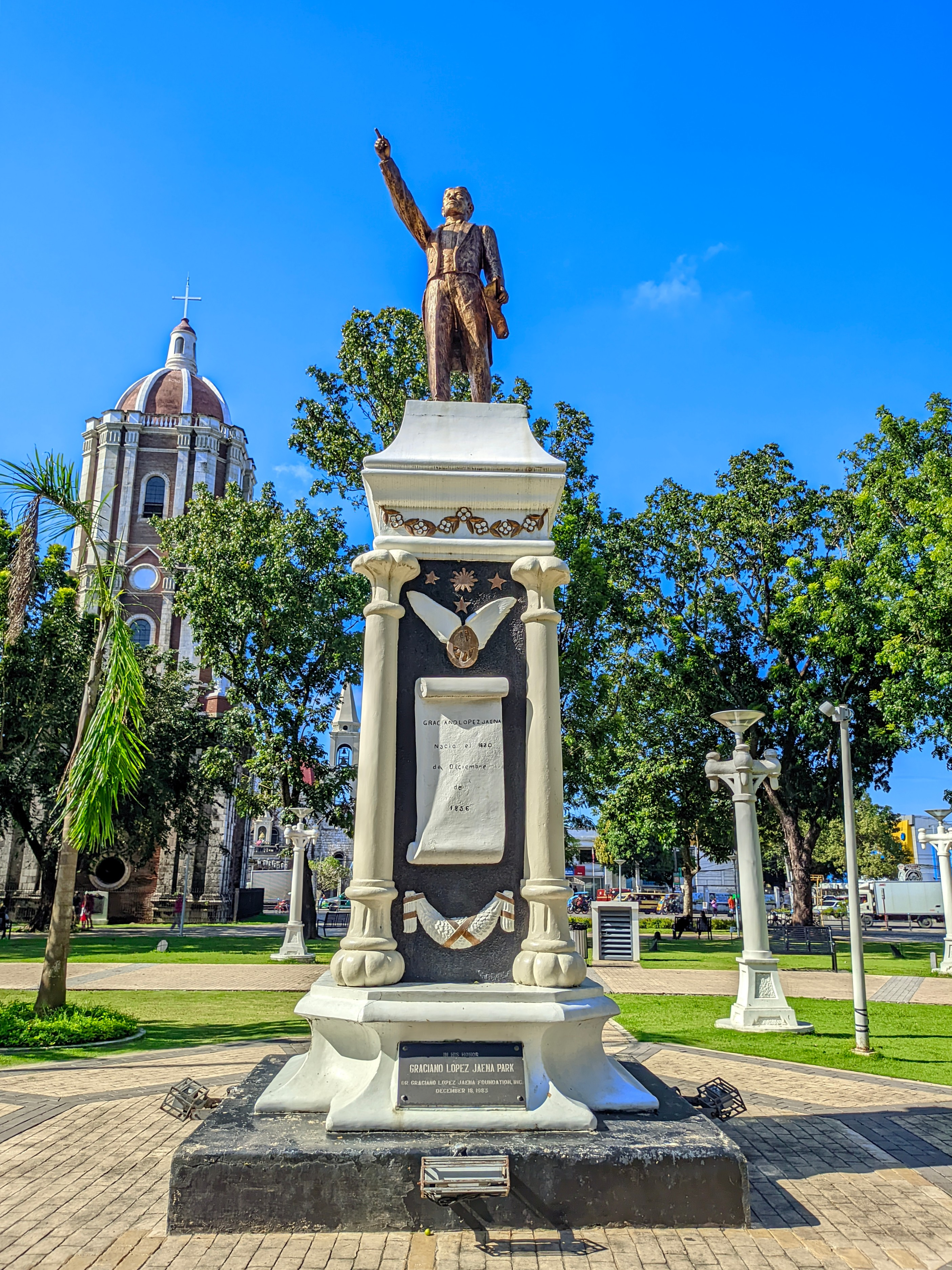
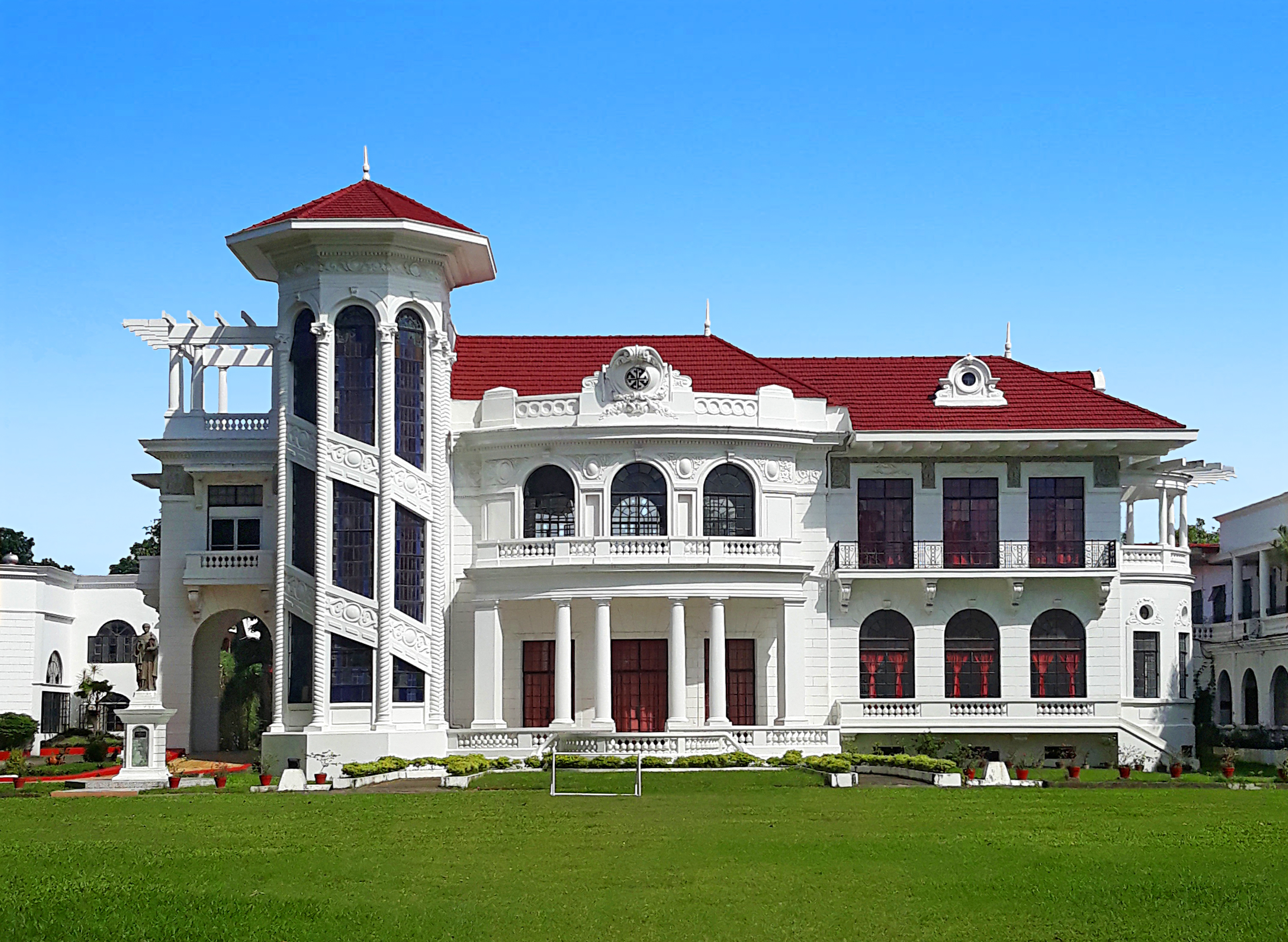
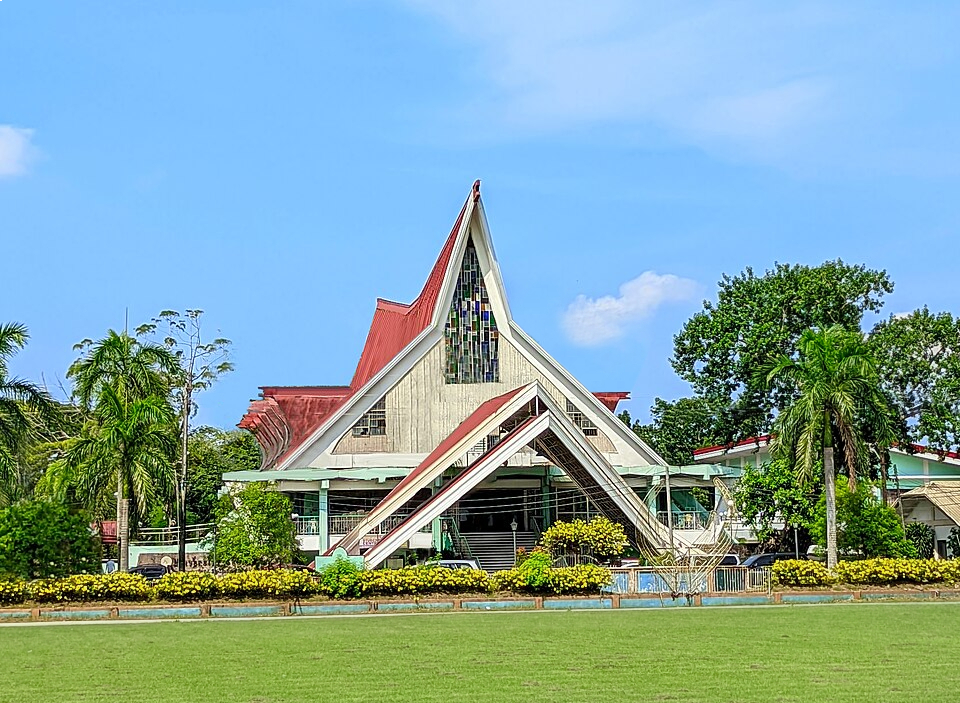
- From top, left-right: Aerial view; Jaro Cathedral; Lopez Heritage House; Jaro Belfry; Graciano Lopez Jaena statue; Jaro Evangelical Church; Lizares Mansion; CPU Church
- Nicknames: City Within a City, The Mestizo Town of Iloilo, Seat of Catholicism in Western Visayas, Center of Candelaria Devotion in the Philippines
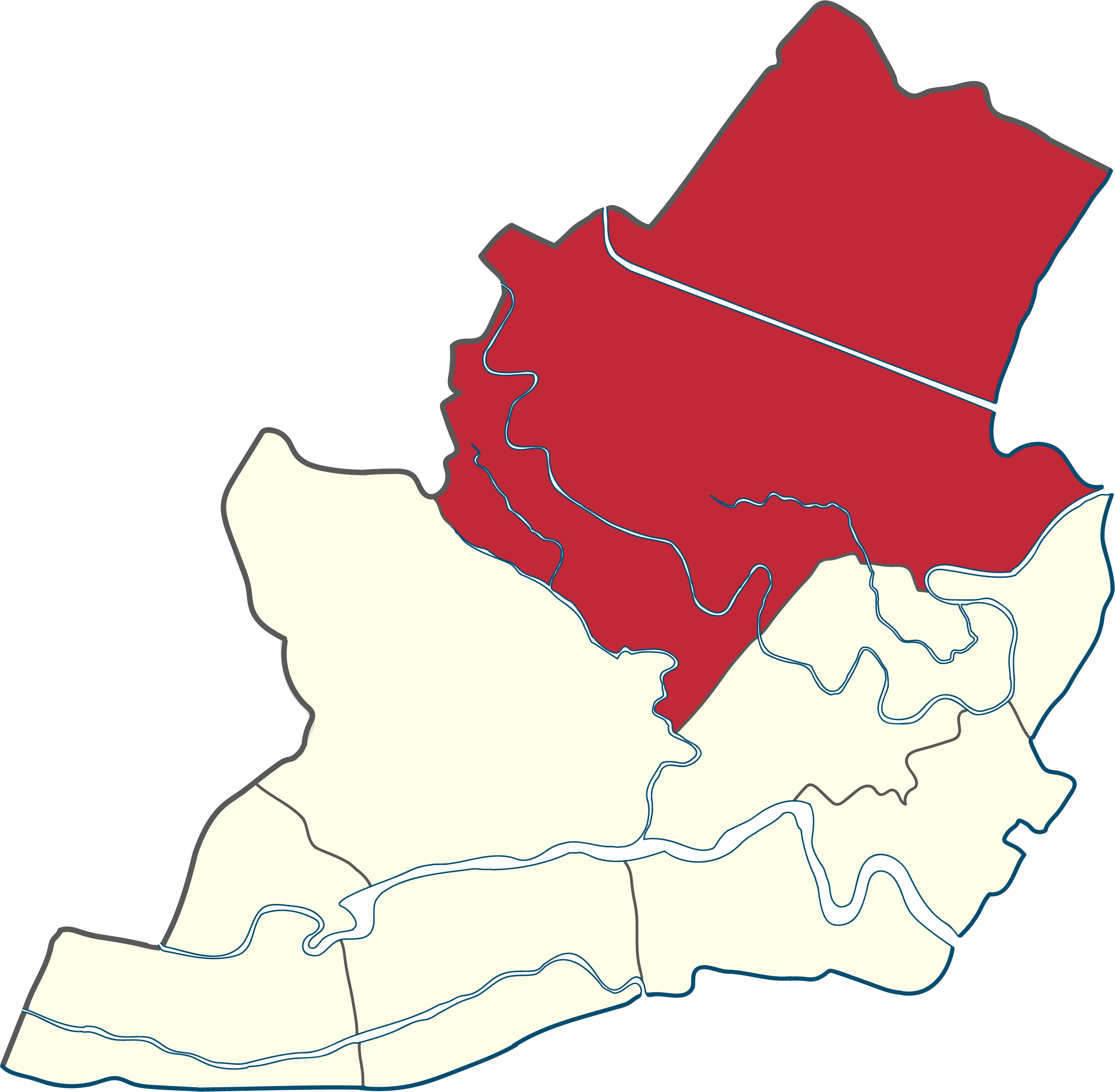
- Location within Iloilo City

- Location in the Philippines Jaro (Philippines)
- Coordinates: 10°44′41″N 122°34′0″E
- Country: Philippines
- Region: Western Visayas (Region VI)
- Province: Iloilo (geographically only)
- City: Iloilo City
- Congressional District: Lone district of Iloilo City
- Founded: 1575 (as a visita of Oton)
- Cityhood: 1891
- Merged into city: January 16, 1941
- Barangays: 42 (see Barangays)

Government
  - District ABC President: Rodel Mamon

Area
  - Total: 27.48 km^{2} (10.61 sq mi)
- Elevation: −2 to 6 m (−6.6 to 19.7 ft)

Population (2024 census)
  - Total: 136,274
  - Density: 4,959/km^{2} (12,840/sq mi)
- Demonym: Jareño
- Time zone: UTC+8 (Philippine Standard Time)
- ZIP code: 5000
- Area code: 33
- Patron saint: Nuestra Señora de la Candelaria de Jaro (Our Lady of the Candles) — Catholic Patron Saint of Western Visayas and Romblon; Saint Elizabeth of Hungary
- Feast day: February 2
- Native languages: Hiligaynon

Jaro (Tagalog: [ˈhaɾo], Spanish: [ˈxaɾo]) is a district in Iloilo City, Philippines. It is the largest district in terms of both geographical area and population, with 136,274 people according to the 2024 census. It is the seat of the Archdiocese of Jaro, which encompasses the provinces of Iloilo, Guimaras, Antique, and Negros Occidental, as well as the center of the Candelaria devotion in the Philippines.

Jaro is renowned for the annual Fiesta Candelaria, held every February 2 in honor of Nuestra Señora de la Candelaria de Jaro (Our Lady of the Candles), the patroness of Western Visayas, Negros Occidental, and Romblon. Her image, perched atop the façade of Jaro Cathedral, was personally crowned by Pope Saint John Paul II in 1981, making it the first Marian image in the Philippines and in Asia to receive such recognition. The district is also known as the Mestizo Town of Iloilo due to its association with prominent Spanish Filipino and affluent Ilonggo families.

As a major religious center, Jaro hosts numerous institutions such as the Seminario de San Vicente Ferrer, Jaro Cathedral (National Shrine of Our Lady of Candles), CPU-Iloilo Mission Hospital, Jaro Evangelical Church, Jaro Adventist Center, and the Convention of Philippine Baptist Churches. It is home to Central Philippine University, a top-ranked university founded by Protestant Baptist Americans.

== History ==
=== Spanish colonial era ===
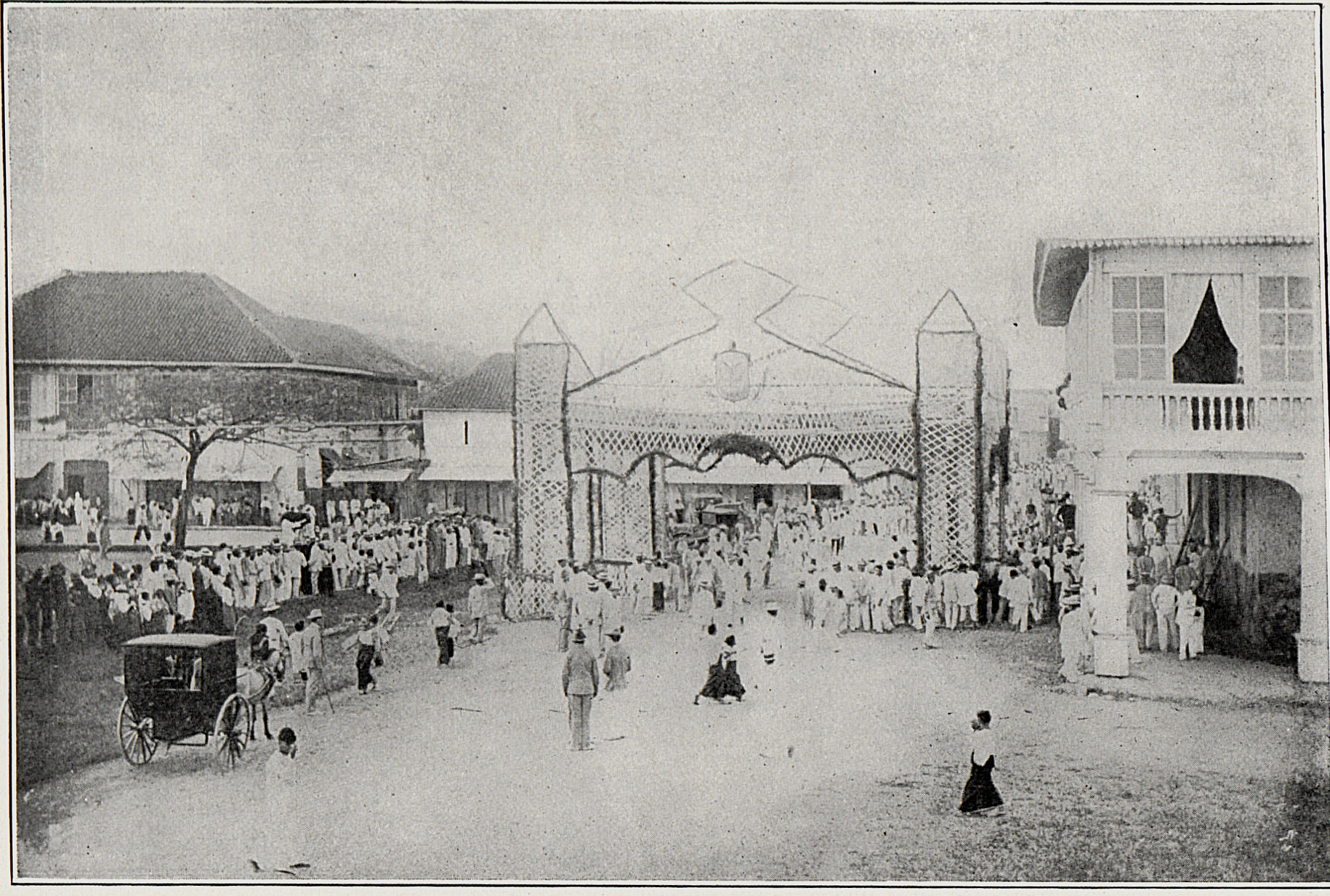
Preparations for the arrival of Governor General William H. Taft, 1900s

Originally named Salog or Saro, it was also referred to as "Ilaya" or "mountain/dry land" together with La Paz which was referred to as "Ilawod" or "sea/wet land". It had been one of the richer areas of Iloilo City even during the Spanish colonial period (1521–1898) and probably the richest town of the entire colony. Historical artifacts indicate that it had once conducted trade with China and Siam (Thailand) due to its port along the navigable river that ran through the town. It was also the center of religious and economic power in the Visayas during the Spanish rule. Although there were no pure Spaniards living in Jaro in the early Spanish period as they mostly lived in the nearby cities of: Oton, Villa de Arevalo, Iloilo City, Dumangas, and Molo, there were still 470 Spanish-Filipino mestizo families; as well as 11 pure Chinese-Filipino families and 665 Chinese-Filipino mestizo families that were scattered all across the province of Iloilo, of which Jaro belongs to it, and that large amounts of Spanish-Filipino mestizos and Chinese-Filipino mestizos had lived in Jaro.

==== Cityhood ====
Jaro officially became a city in 1891. La Paz, which was a former part of Jaro, became independent. Jaro, along with the neighboring towns of La Paz, Mandurriao, and Molo, was incorporated into the then-municipality of Iloilo by virtue of Act No. 719 of 1903. By Executive Order No. 64 of December 24, 1907, the former municipalities of Jaro and Pavia (which was incorporated into Iloilo municipality by virtue of Act No. 1333 of April 19, 1905) were separated from the municipality of Iloilo and constituted as its own municipality of Jaro with effect on February 15, 1908. By Executive Order No. 1 of 1921, Pavia was separated from Jaro and made its own municipality.

=== American colonial era ===
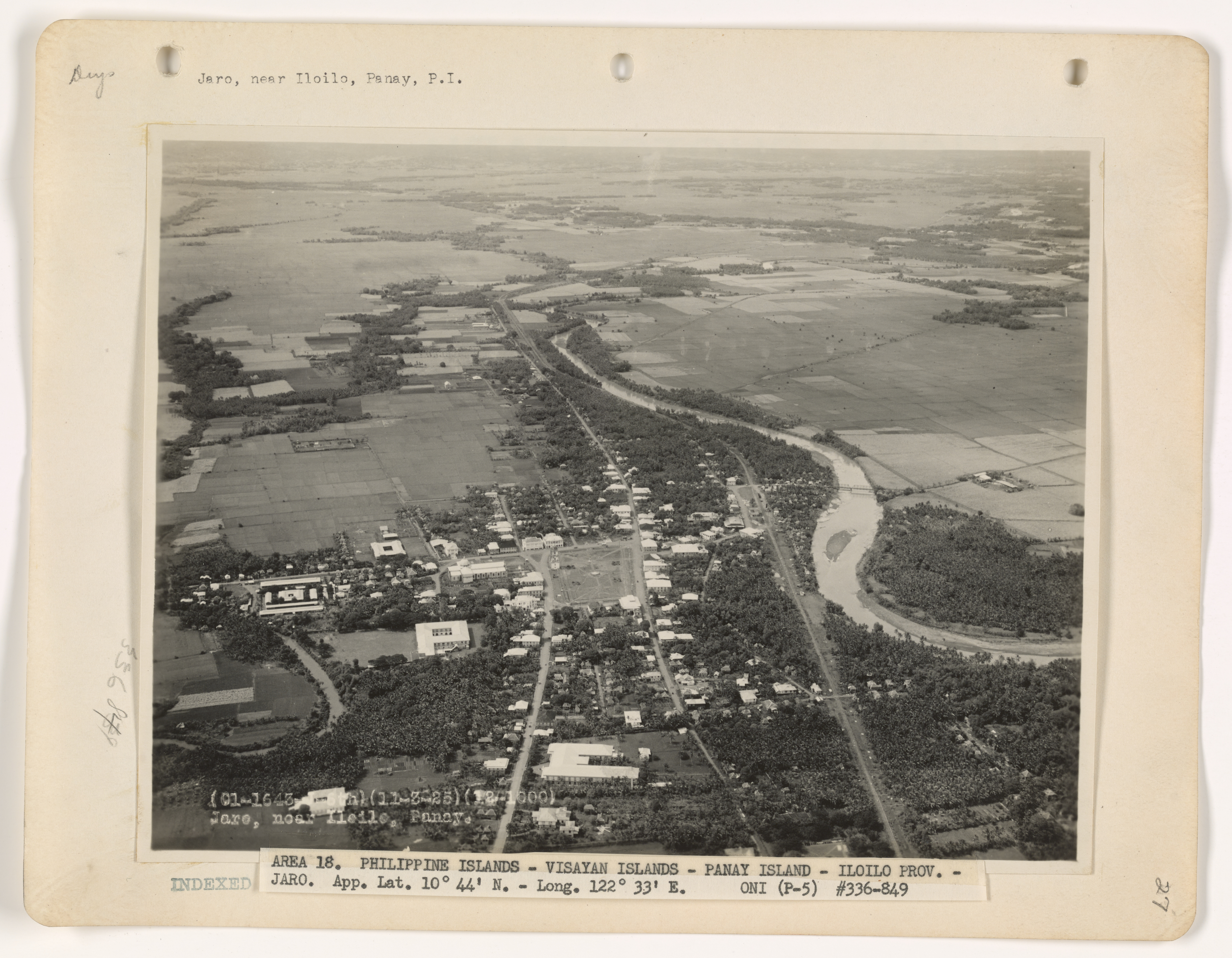
Aerial view of Jaro, circa early 1900s.

By Executive Order No. 97 of December 6, 1915 of the American government, Leganes was removed from the municipality of Santa Barbara and made a part of Jaro with effect on January 1, 1916. (Note: Leganes was made a part of the municipality of Santa Barbara by virtue of Act No. 719 of 1903;) Leganes was separated from the municipality of Jaro and made its own municipality with effect on January 1, 1940, by virtue of Executive Order No. 241 of December 23, 1939.

In the 1930s, the neighboring towns of La Paz and Villa de Arevalo were incorporated into Iloilo City, at a time when all economic activities shifted to the port of Iloilo; and Jaro, on the other hand, followed suit to be absorbed into Iloilo City on January 7, 1941.

The present independent Iloilo municipalities of Leganes and Pavia were also formerly under the jurisdiction of Jaro at some points in their history.

By Commonwealth Act No. 604 of August 22, 1940, the Iloilo City charter was amended and the municipality of Jaro was declared to be incorporated into Iloilo City "on the date that the President of the Philippines may set by proclamation". To that effect, President Manuel L. Quezon issued Proclamation No. 663 on January 7, 1941, giving January 16 as the date of Jaro's incorporation into Iloilo City.

Jaro's location between Dungon Creek and the Tigum River fulfills an ideal design for establishing communities during the Spanish colonial era: a site between two rivers, with a church and plaza in the center, and homes of affluent families in the vicinity. The church is the famous Parish of Our Lady of Candles, also known as the Jaro Metropolitan Cathedral, the headquarters of the Archdiocese of Jaro and the site of a believed to be miraculous statue of the Virgin Mary, which is a statue that has supposedly been growing in size ever since its discovery. Legends also state that among misty days, the Virgin Mary had disappeared from its original nook near the apex of the cathedral and bathed her child in the stream that used to well-forth from Jaro Plaza or that in Moro incursions, the Virgin had assisted in frightening off the raiders. The Marian image perched atop the facade of the cathedral was canonically crowned by Pope John Paul II during his visit on February 21, 1981 (the first Marian image or statue in the Philippines crowned by a Pope and Saint).

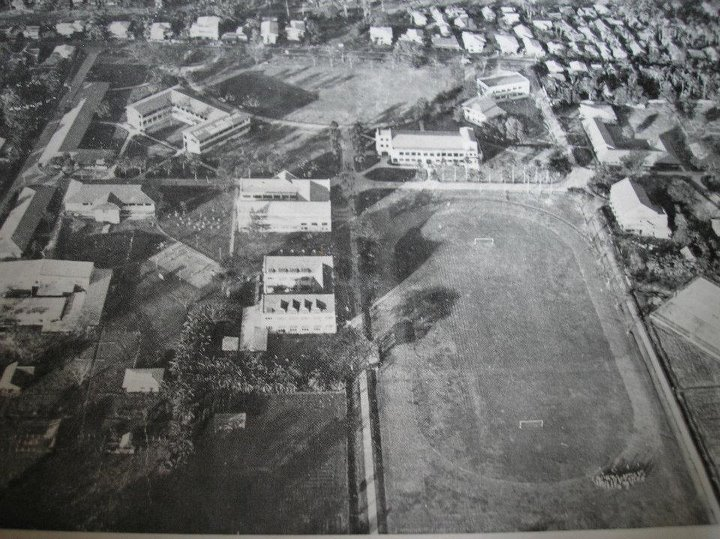
Aerial view Central Philippine University in the 1960s. The university's main campus was heavily destroyed during World War II. Post war reconstruction resulted to a well laid and organized campus plan.

The coming of the Americans in the early 20th century when the Philippines was ceded by Spain to the United States through the 1898 Treaty of Paris brought with them the Protestant religion and Iloilo is one of the first places where they came and started a mission in the Philippines. During the American occupation, the Philippine islands were divided into different Protestant missions and Western Visayas came to the jurisdiction of the Baptists. Baptist missionaries came although other Protestant sects also came especially the Presbyterians and they established numerous institutions. The Presbyterians established the Iloilo Mission Hospital in 1901, the first Protestant and American founded hospital in the country while the Baptists established the Jaro Evangelical Church, the first Baptist church in the islands, and the Central Philippine University in 1905, which was founded by William Valentine through a grant given by the American industrialist, oil magnate and philanthropist John D. Rockefeller as the first university in the City of Jaro and also the first Baptist founded and second American university in Asia.

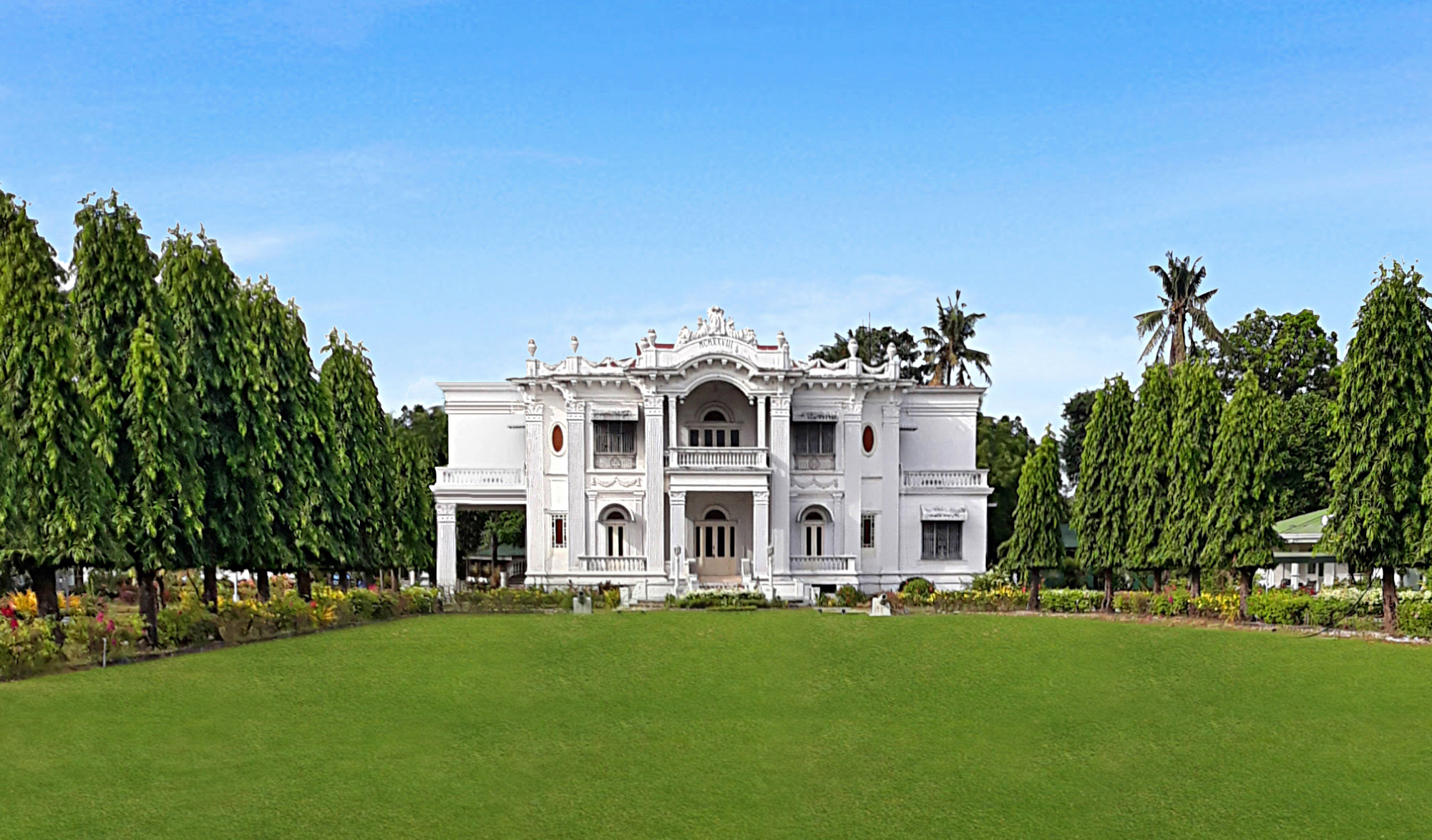
Mansion de Lopez or Lopez Heritage House (Nelly's Garden) which is regaled as Queen of all heritage houses in Iloilo and Panay.

Jaro's celebration of the feast of Nuestra Señora de la Candelaria (Our Lady of the Candles) every February 2 is well known in the Philippines. The fiesta features pageantry with a fiesta queen from one of the prominent Spanish Filipino families of the place, and a cockfight at the Iloilo Coliseum, where cockfighting aficionados from all over the Philippines converge.

The district is notable for its large amount of nineteenth-century architecture. Straddling the main plaza is the antique Jaro Cathedral and the Palasyo, the Archbishop's residence. Early 20th-century colonial American architecture can be found also in American established institutions and structures especially on the main campus of Central Philippine University; the Jaro Evangelical Church, the first Baptist church in the Philippines; and the Jaro City Hall.

The majority of the mestizo families from Iloilo came from this town as it was a center of trade and the main port in the region during the Spanish period; many Spanish traders married natives and settled on the island.

=== 21st century ===
At present, Jaro holds the distinction of being the largest of all the seven districts comprising Iloilo City by land area and population. It still also known for being called as the cradle of Christian faith in Western Visayas or as seat of Catholicism and Protestantism in Western Visayas with pioneer and renowned religious institutions founded in the district.

The recent economic boom in Iloilo ushered unprecedented growth with new malls, condominiums, hospitals, banks, hotels and townships by real estate developers either to be built or already opened in the district. Newly opened malls include the CityMall – Tagbak, Jaro of DoubleDragon Properties, the Robinsons Place Jaro of Robinsons Land, Puregold – Jaro, to name a few. On the other hand, projects that are in the pipeline of some of the known Philippine real estate developers include the Sta. Lucia Land's Green Meadows East township in Tacas, Jaro and the SM Prime's 48 hectare land in Balabago, Jaro for their upcoming mall, the SM Prime Iloilo or SM City Iloilo – Jaro.

== Geography ==
Jaro is the largest district in Iloilo City, spanning 27.48 square kilometres (10.61 sq mi) of total land area. It is about 3.86 kilometres (2.40 mi) from Iloilo City Proper. Jaro borders the districts of Mandurriao to the southwest and La Paz to the southeast. It also connects with the municipalities of Pavia to the northwest and Leganes to the north. The district is crossed by the Jaro River and Dungon Creek, and it faces the Iloilo Strait and Buenavista, Guimaras to the east. Jaro is the only district in Iloilo City without access to the Iloilo River.

=== Barangays ===
The district of Jaro has the second-most barangays in the city, with a total of 42.

- Arguelles
- Balabago
- Balantang
- Benedicto
- Bito-on
- Buhang
- Buntatala
- Calubihan
- Camalig
- Claudio Castilla El-98
- Cuartero
- Cubay
- Democracia
- Desamparados
- Dungon A
- Dungon B
- Fajardo
- Javellana
- Lanit
- Libertad Santa Isabel
- Lopez Jaena
- Luna
- M.H. del Pilar
- M.V. Hechanova
- Ma. Cristina
- Montinola
- Our Lady of Fatima
- Our Lady of Lourdes
- Quintin Salas
- Sambag
- San Isidro
- San Jose
- San Pedro
- San Roque
- San Vicente
- Seminario
- Simon Ledesma
- Tabuc Suba
- Tacas
- Tagbac
- Taytay Zone II
- Ungka

== Demographics ==
=== Population ===
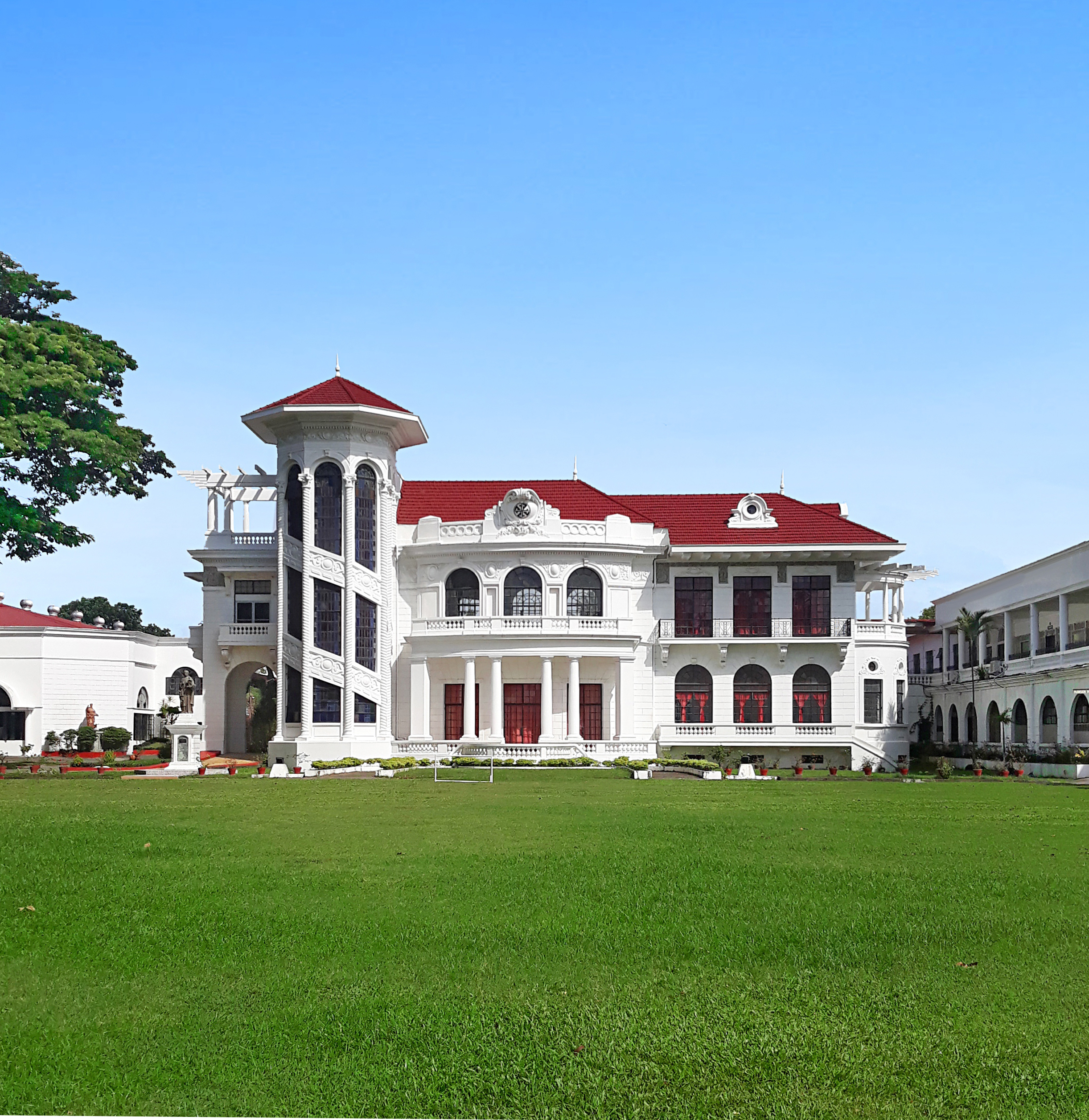
Lizares Mansion or Villa Lizares (Angelicum School Iloilo) is one of the notable mansions built by the old mestizo and old-rich Ilonggo families in Jaro.

Historically, Jaro holds a high-concentration of many ancestral mansions of old Visayan families mainly of Chinese mestizo descent, and sometimes of Spanish descent. Family mansions such as those owned by the Lopez, Montinola, Sansón, Ruiz de Luzuriaga (of Negros Island), de la Rama (also of Negros Island), de Araneta, etc. families line the streets of this historic district.

The French traveler Gabriel Lafond de Lurcy wrote of the place as such in his travelogues:

French: "Haro est beaucoup plus considérable que Ilo-Ilo: c'est un lieu opulent, des métis y possèdent de fort grandes fortunes. Le gou- verneur de l'île ou l'alcade mayor habite Ilo-Ilo, où sont les ma- gasins du gouvernement, les chantiers de construction et le fort. Le peuple de Haro est beaucoup plus civilisé que celui des deux autres villes voisines; son teint est plus blanc, conséquence d'un plus grand mélange du sang européen; on y parle mieux l'espagnol que dans aucun autre lieu de la colonie, la capitale exceptée; les femmes y sont fort belles, et je puis assurer que m'étant trouvé avec plusieurs d'entre elles, j'en ai vu dont la grâce, la taille et les traits eussent été remarqués en Europe; le goût préside à leur toilette, qui est riche et élégante, et comme toutes les créoles, elles ont généralement de l'esprit."

English: "Jaro is much bigger in size than Iloilo (now Iloilo City Proper); it is a rich town, of mestizos who own great fortunes... the people of Haro are more civilized than those of the other neighboring towns (Molo and Iloilo). The color of their skin is whiter, consequence of a great mixture of European blood; and Spanish is spoken better there than in any place in the colony, the Capital excepted; the women are very beautiful and I can give assurance of this, having had the pleasure of being amongst them, that they have grace and figure and the features, which would call attention even in Europe. They show taste in their dress, which is rich and elegant and, like all mestizas, they show a lot of spirit."

—

At present, Jaro which holds the distinction as being the largest by land area of all the seven districts of Iloilo City, also is the most populous. The economic boom in Iloilo City from 2010 to 2020, resulted to an urban sprawl converting the once grass fields in the areas of barangays or barrios of Sambag, Tacas, Balabago and Bitoon (Coastal Road), McArthur (from Tabuc Suba to Buntatala) sprouted with subdivisions, retail centers and stores, malls, car showrooms and other establishments, which doubled the district's number of households and population.

=== Religion ===
Jaro Evangelical Church, the first Baptist Church in the Philippines (the first Protestant Church outside Manila).

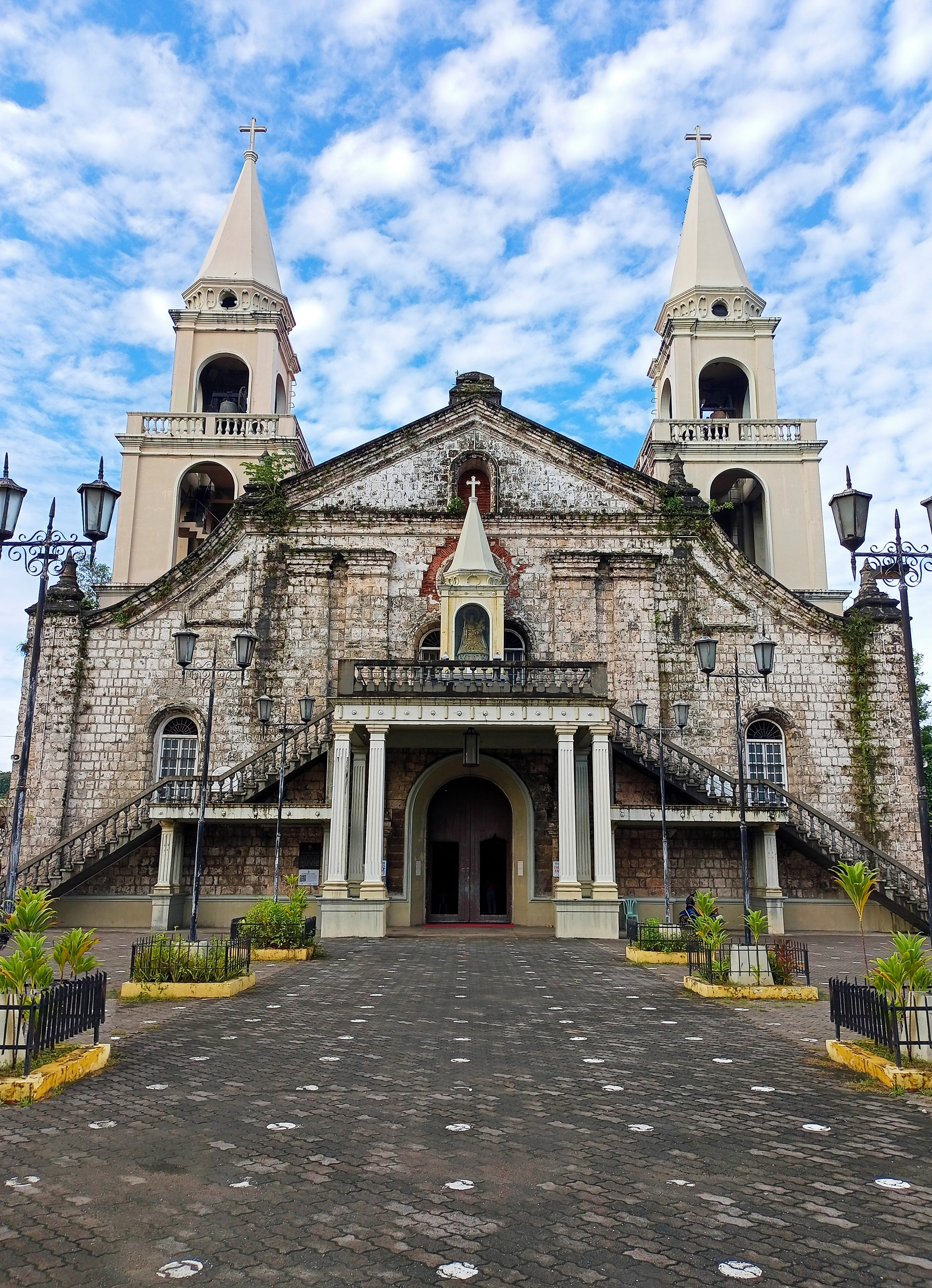
The Jaro Cathedral or National Shrine of Our Lady of Candles, the seat of Catholicism in the Western Visayas region.

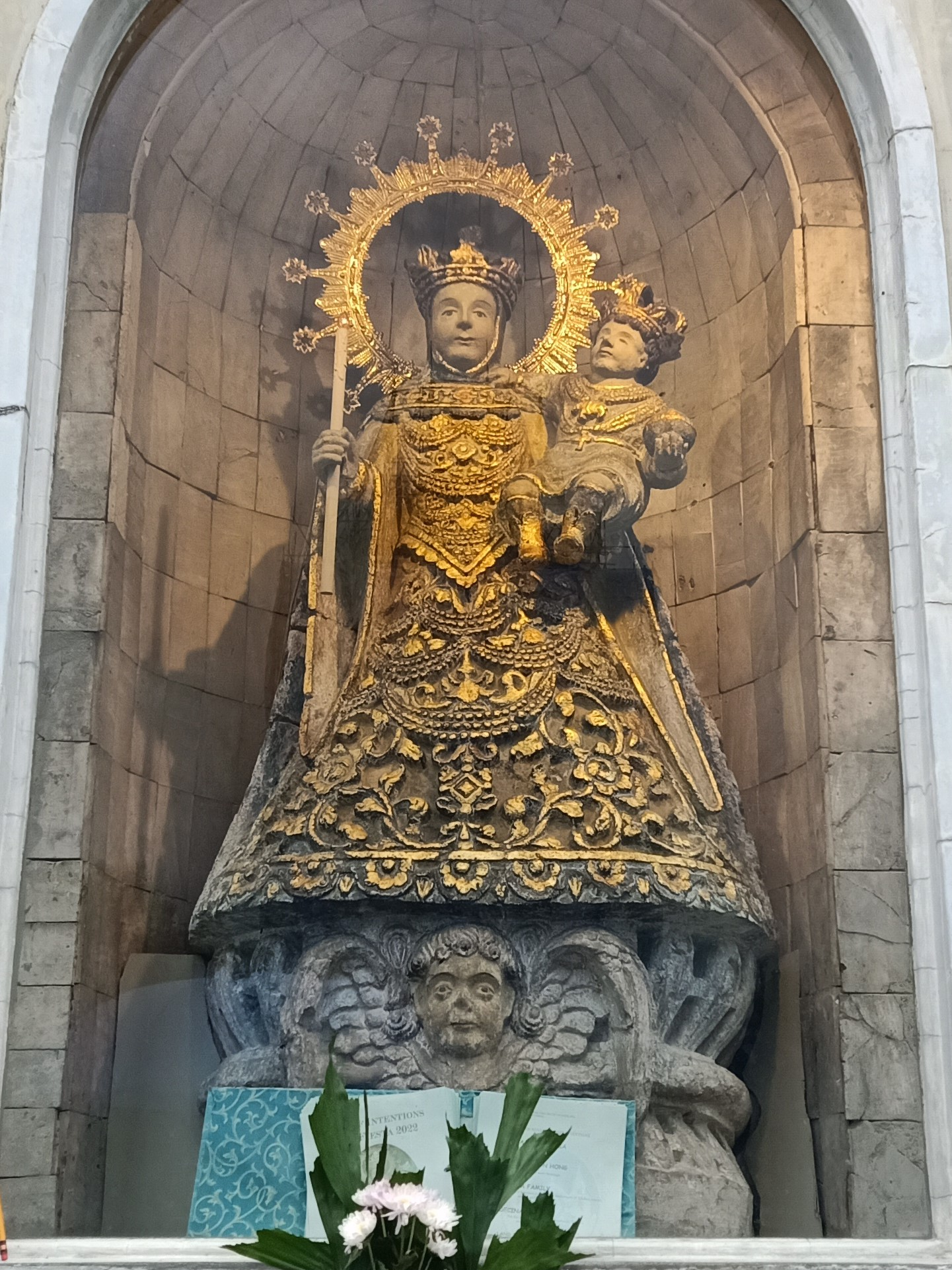
The image of Nuestra Señora de la Candelaria de Jaro (Candelaria) perched atop the facade of Jaro Cathedral, the Catholic patron of Western Visayas.

Jaro is the cradle of Christian faith in Iloilo and Western Visayas. It is the seat of Catholicism in the region. Some notable religious institutions were built by either the Spanish and American missionaries. The Jaro Cathedral is the seat of the Archdiocese of Jaro which covers the provinces of Iloilo, Antique, Guimaras and Negros Occidental.

It is one of the oldest and largest archdioceses in the country which dates back its founding in 1500s. The provinces of Negros Oriental, Palawan, Zamboanga, Romblon, Capiz and Mindoro were some of the former parts of the archdiocese but became independent and subsequently under their new respective archdioceses.

The Jaro Cathedral has also been elevated as a National Shrine by the Catholic Bishops Conference of the Philippines (CPBC), the second national shrine in Visayas (first marian dedicated church/cathedral national shrine in Visayas and Mindanao). The cathedral is known for its widely venerated image of the Nuestra Señora de la Candelaria (Our Lady of the Candles) which was brought by the Spanish Catholics, the official patroness of Western Visayas and Romblon. It is the first marian image crowned personally without a papal legate by a pope and saint in the Philippines and Asia, Pope John Paul II.

Besides the Archdiocese of Jaro and the Jaro Cathedral, the Americans which brought the Protestantism, resulted for the establishment of some of the notable institutions that are found in the district – the headquarters of the Convention of Philippine Baptist Churches, the first and oldest Baptist churches union (founded in 1900); the Jaro Adventist Center, the first organized Seventh-day Adventist church in the Philippines (founded in 1914); the Jaro Evangelical Church, the CPU-Iloilo Mission Hospital, the first American and Protestant hospital in the Philippines (founded in 1901), the first Baptist church in the Philippines or the first Protestant church outside Manila (founded in 1900); and the first Baptist and second American university in Asia, the Central Philippine University (founded in 1905).

There are also congregations that established their presence in the district which gains a number of adherents – the Jehovah's Witnesses, Church of Christ of Latter Day Saints, and the Iglesia ni Cristo, to name a few.

== Economy ==
Aerial view of Jaro Plaza area

Since the Spanish colonial era, Jaro has been well known for being the turn-table of land transportation to northern, western, central and eastern Panay, thus delivery of goods made way in the town as a transit area. The sugar boom made riches that earmarked the rise of affluent old-rich mestizo Jareño families – Ledesma, Locsín, Lopéz (of Lopez Holdings Corporation), Hofileña, Jalandoni, Guadarrama, Mirasol, Huervana, Jaen, Javellana, Javellosa, Jalbuena, Lizares, Montinola (of Bank of the Philippine Islands), and Villanueva, to name a few.

The 21st economic boom of Iloilo City after the Iloilo International Airport was transferred to the town of Sta. Barbara, ushered for big real estate, hospitals, banks, and retail developers to launch or open malls and townships in the town. WaterWorld Iloilo, the largest water park in Western Visayas, also opened in Alta Tierra Village in Jaro.

=== Townships and mixed-use residential and commercial communities ===
Some of the developments in Jaro include the Sta. Lucia Land has the 10+ hectare Green Meadows East Township with an upscale mall (first outside Luzon), condominiums, hotel and other facilities; the SM Prime's 48-hectare property in Barangay Balabago, Jaro for the upcoming SM City Jaro complex; the Robinsons Place Jaro (the second Robinsons mall in Iloilo); and the CityMall – Tagbak, Jaro of the DoubleDragon Properties.

- SM City Jaro – 48-hectare complex composed of an SM Supermall, 11-tower SMDC Glade Residences condo project, a Waterfront Hotel, and a Shangri-La Hotel – Iloilo. Located in Barangay Balabago, Jaro, Iloilo City.
- Green Meadows East – 14 hectare township of Sta. Lucia Land, Inc. in Barangay Tacas, Jaro composed of a mall, office towers, and condominiums.
- Green Meadows – Iloilo's first lake-based residential township located adjacent to the north of Green Meadows East township.

=== Shopping malls ===
- SM City Jaro – upcoming mall in the 48 hectare property of SM Prime Holdings in Barangay Balabago, Jaro, Iloilo City.
- Sta. Lucia Mall Iloilo – upcoming mall in Green Meadows East township, a 172-hectare property of Sta. Lucia Land, Inc. in Barangay Tacas, Jaro, Iloilo City.
- CityMall Tagbak, Jaro – a community mall type opened on October 10, 2015, it is the 2nd CityMall in Panay and 1st in Iloilo City and province. It is owned by DoubleDragon Properties Corp.
- Robinsons Place Jaro – opened on September 8, 2016, it is the 2nd Robinsons mall in Iloilo City. A three-level with lower ground upscale mall, it has cinema theaters, boutique and retail stores, and Robinson's brand establishments.
- Jaro Town Square – a community mall owned by SM Prime Holdings located at MacArthur Highway, Barangay Quintin Salas, Jaro, Iloilo City.

== Culture ==
Spanish culture is heavily imprinted in Jareños way of life – the celebrations of patronal fiestas, language, people, education and cuisine. The Christian faith brought by the Spaniards left a remarkable and significant religious influence found everywhere in Jaro. Throughout the year, annual patronal barrio fiestas are held within the barangays/barrios in Jaro. In cuisine, several Jareño dishes are either heavily Hispanic derived or influenced. American colonizers also created an impact in Jaro's cultural sphere through the introduction of their culture and the Protestant faith which they brought.

=== Museums and art galleries ===
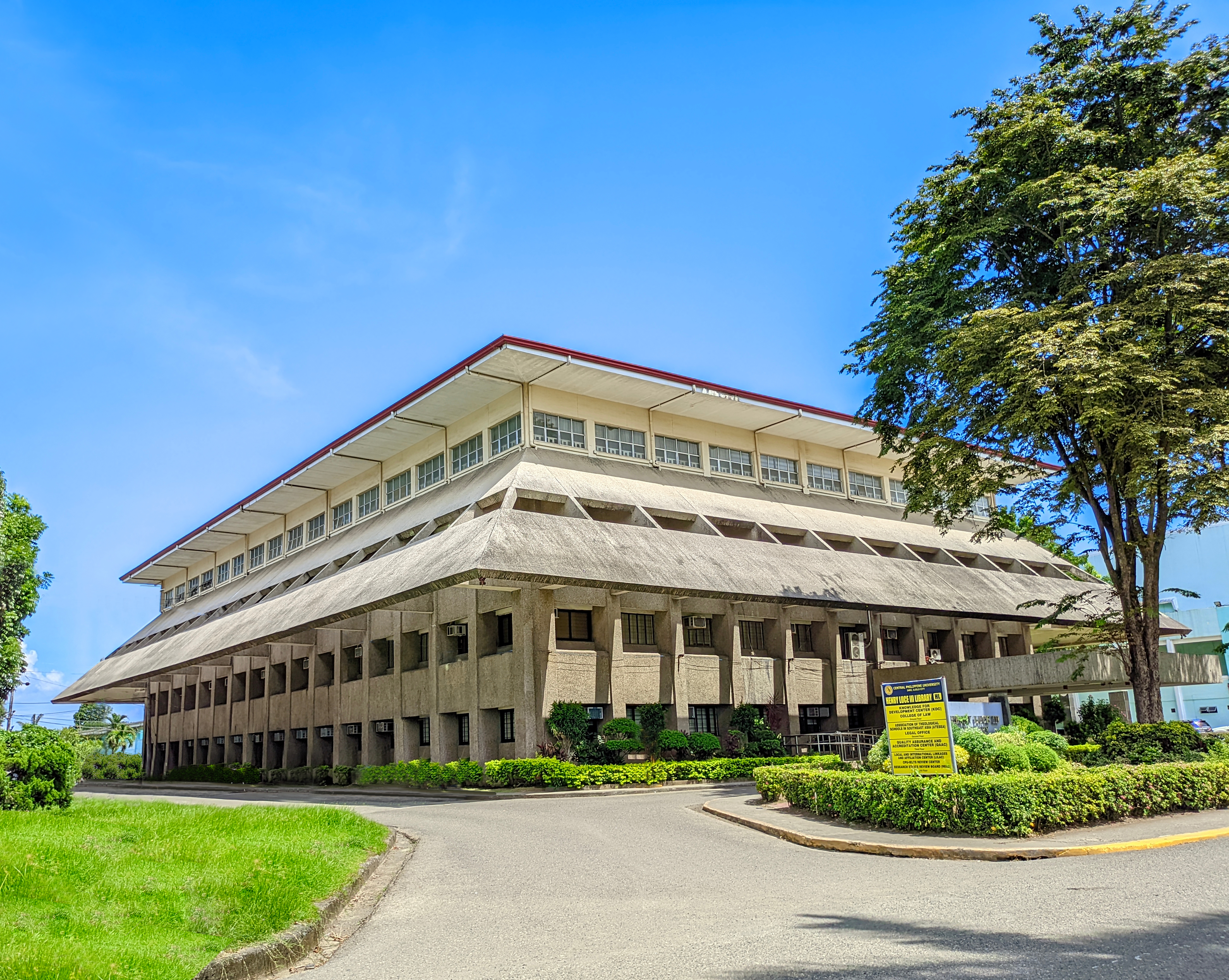
The Henry Luce III (Museum and Library) of Central Philippine University, is the largest library/museum in Western Visayas with museum and special collections ranging from Sacred Music, Asian Arts and Artifacts, World War II and American-Philippine History.

Museums are repositories of Jareños, or Ilonggos as a whole, way of life during pre-colonial, colonial and post colonial and modern periods. A plethora of art galleries and museums showcasing exhibits of fossils and historical artifacts and artworks from both local and international artists are found in Jaro.

The Henry Luce III (Museum and Library) of Central Philippine University is the largest library in Western Visayas with a volume or holdings of 250,000+ books, magazines and bibliotech documents. Its Meyer Asian Collection are artworks and artifacts from all over the various regions of Asia. Other collections of Henry Luce include World War II documents, the Centraliana collection/section and the Filipiniana collection.

The Raul Gonzales Museum was built in honor of the late former Department of Justice Secretary, Raul M. Gonzalez. It has exhibits showcasing the family and Justice Secretary's life as a public servant.

The National Commission on Culture and the Arts Regional and Cultural Hub is the first of its kind in the Philippines housed in the art-deco designed Municipio de Jaro (Jaro Municipal Hall), the Old City Hall of Jaro. The structure which formerly housed the National Museum Regional Office has been turned over to the Iloilo City Government and then to the National Commission on Culture and the Arts.

The Dr. Graciano Lopez-Jaena Museum and Library is an edifice built in honor of the notable Philippine Revolution figure and Ilonggo national hero, Graciano Lopez-Jaena, in its home along Fajardo Street in Jaro. It stands as a Memorial museum and library.

The Agatona 1927 Museum and Café which is located beside Plaza Jaro, houses religious relics, arts, and a café restaurant.

Several other museum and arts galleries in Jaro include – Patrocinio Gamboa Museum or Jaro Museum, the Angelicum Art Gallery at Angelicum School Iloilo, the Libreria Candelaria at Jaro Cathedral and the Museo del Palacio Arzobispal (Archbishop's Palace Museum).

=== Performing and visual arts ===
The Rose Memorial Auditorium, the largest university auditorium in Western Visayas.

In performing and visual arts, cultural and musical shows are largely held by institutions such as universities in Jaro. The Rose Memorial Auditorium at Central Philippine University, is the largest theater in Western Visayas notable for being the host venue for known music concerts from famous personas in Philippine music industry. It has a full seating capacity of 4000 persons, and various local, national and international symposiums and music concerts are held in the said auditorium.

Rose Memorial Auditorium was built in honor of the university's former American President Francis Howard Rose, also one of the Hopevale Martyrs during World War II. Concerts held at Rose include performances of the band MYMP, Sharon Cuneta, Sarah Geronimo, The Platters, The Carpenters, Hale (band), Christian Bautista, among others. Notable speeches and symposiums held at the auditorium include famous personalities – Gina Lopez and Gloria Arroyo. Rose was the first annual venue of the prestigious national Bombo Music Festival when during its early years since it was established. Recently, the Cultural Center of the Philippines has designated the Rose Memorial Auditorium for three-year Memorandum of Understanding, as one of the first batch of nine Cultural Center of the Philippines Regional Art Centers or Kaisa sa Sining Regional Art Centers in 2014, which is the only one in Western Visayas region.

=== Festivals ===
As Jaro is the seat of Catholicism in Western Visayas, some of its festivals are religious celebrated. The Fiesta Candelaria or Feast of the Our Lady of the Candles, commonly known as Fiesta de Jaro (Jaro Fiesta) held every February 2, is one of the largest and known religious feast in honor of Virgin Mary in the Philippines. It's a celebration in honor of Western Visayas's official patron, Nuestra Señora de la Candelaria (Our Lady of the Candles). It was brought by the Spaniards where it is also widely venerated in the Canary Islands as Virgin of Candelaria.

The feast is a month long celebration which includes an agro-industrial fair with carnival rides and a pageantry with a Reyna del Fiesta (Fiesta Queen) selected annually among the daughters of affluent and old-rich Jareño families – Locsin, Javellana, Lopéz, Hofileña, Jalandoni, Guadarrama, Villar, Ledesma, Cocjin, Jaranilla, and Javelosa. A cockfighting is also held few days before or on the day of fiesta. On Bisperas, a religious procession is held with the coronation of the image of Our Lady of Candles. On the feast day, a traditional banquet is held in every household around the town's square with various religious masses being celebrated in Jaro Cathedral from dawn to dusk.

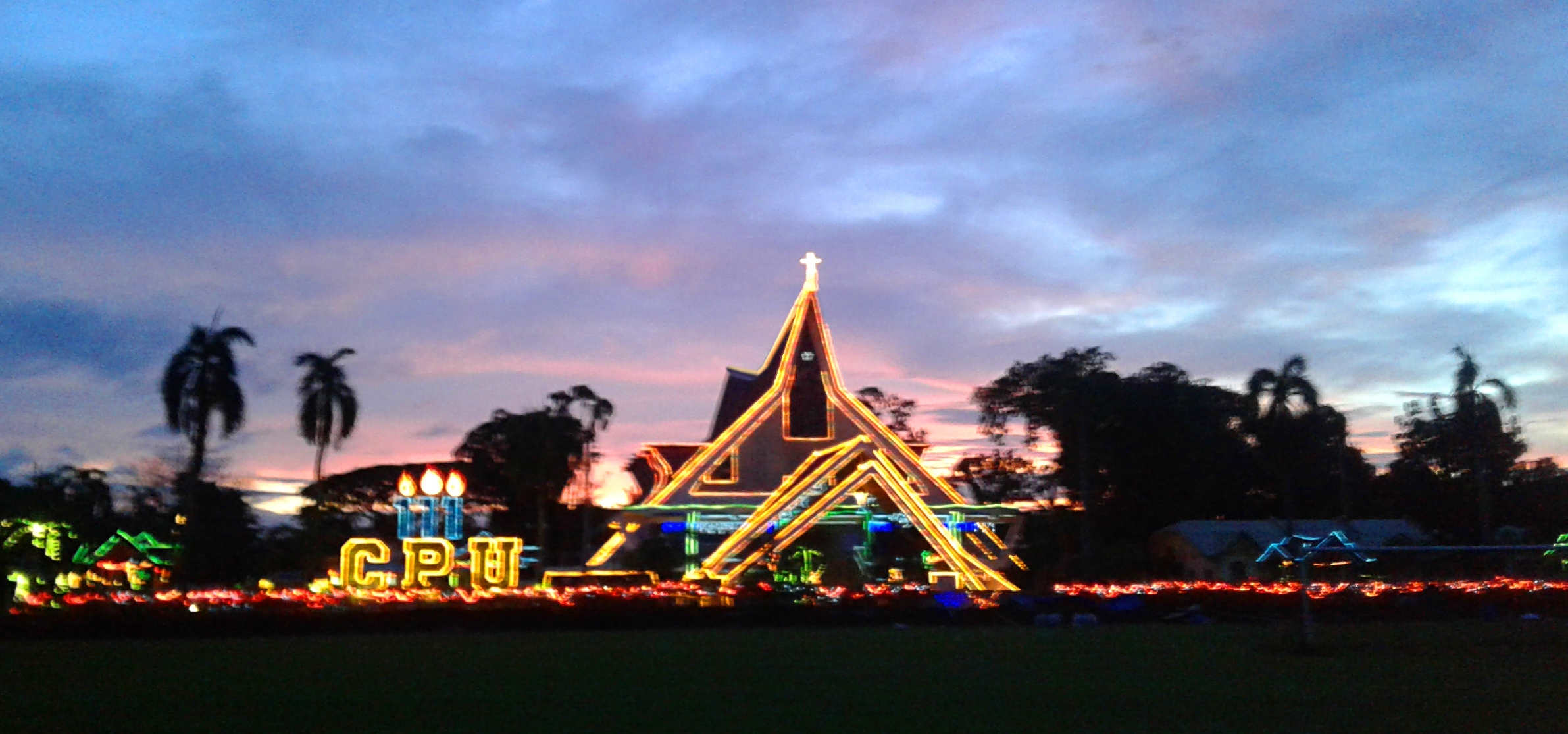
The Festival of Lights and Music at Central 2016 of Central Philippine University.

Another religious celebration brought by the Spanish colonists, the Semana Santa, is also celebrated either it falls in March or April every year. A week long Catholic celebration commemorating the life of Jesus Christ until his crucifixion and resurrection, religious masses and biblical portrayals and plays are held throughout the said celebration.

During yuletide season every year, the Festival of Lights and Music at Central is a known and flocked by tourists Christmas lights display and music festival held at Central Philippine University. It started in 1998 and is considered as the longest running and largest university based Christmas festival of lights in Western Visayas.

A fireworks display and the traditional switching on of Christmas lights accompanied by orchestra music from the CPU Symphonic Band is held on the opening night with known invited personas like Senators, Congressmen, Mayors and Governors are present as guests. The festival has also food kiosk carnival rides in the half moon drive and field. Several nightly cultural celebrations including battle of the bands within the university's colleges are showcased. A Christmas concert is also held a week or so before the Christmas Day at the CPU Church.

=== Architecture and historical landmarks ===
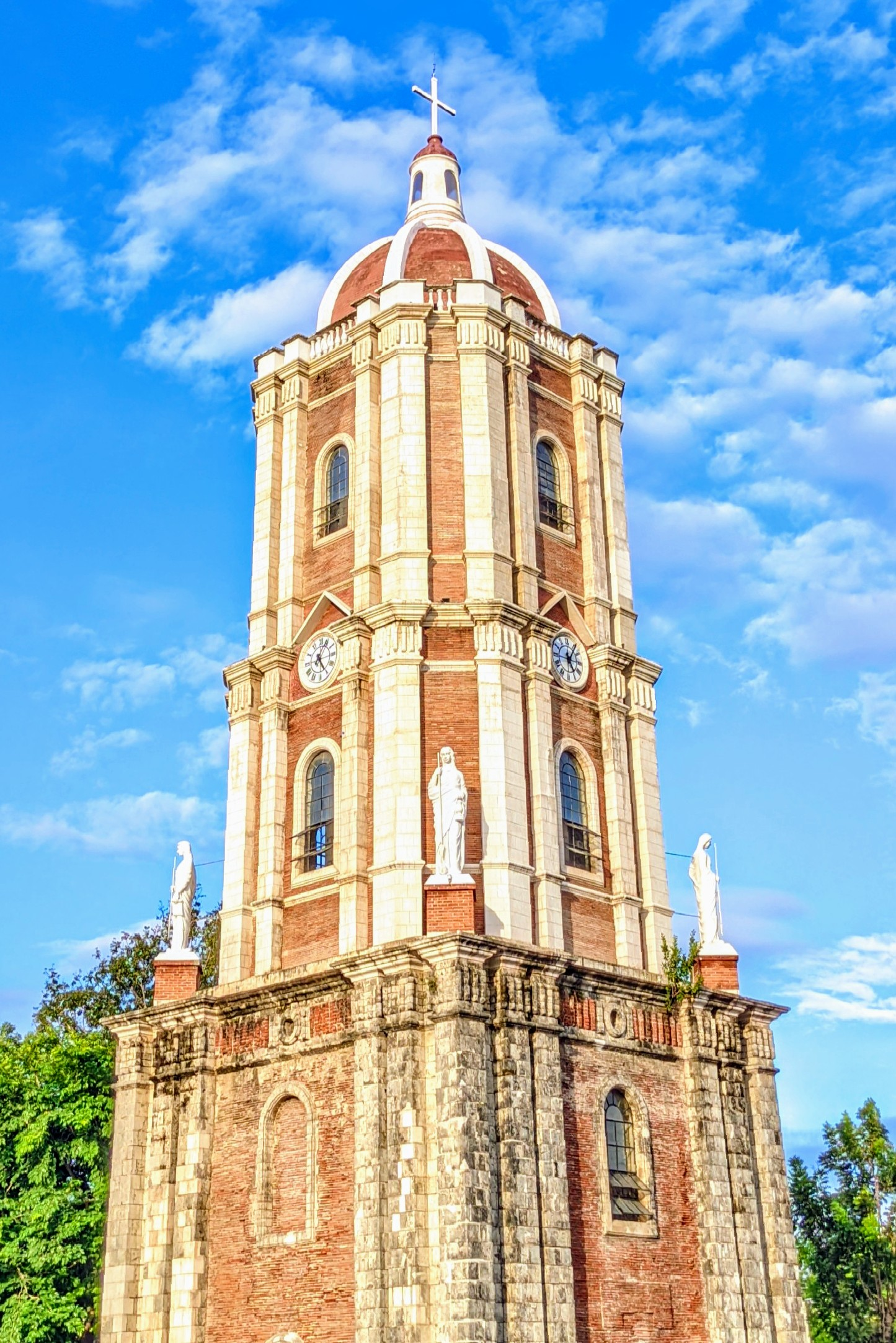
The Jaro Belfry (Campanario de Jaro)

Jaro has notable landmarks that attest to its heritage and affluent bygone eras. The sugar boom during the Spanish and early American colonial periods became a factor for old rich Jareño families to build abodes that became testament to it that still stands to this day. Religion became a guiding force for Spanish Catholic missionaries to construct ecclesiastical buildings, including the Jaro Cathedral Campanario de Jaro, one of the few free-standing bell towers in the Philippine islands, and Jaro Cathedral. The Americans who brought Protestantism established the Central Philippine University which holds structures built during the American colonial era.

A fine example of Spanish influence for and organized town center in Jaro is the Plaza Jaro (Jaro Square) which is bounded in all sides by government institutions, a church, schools and the archbishop's palace; a typical layout town plan and civic center found in all Spanish colonies and even in Spain.

The Campanario de Jaro or Jaro Belfry which was built in 1744 by the Spaniards, is one of the few belfries in the country that stood apart from the church where it belonged. It has served both as a religious structure and as a military watchtower during the Spanish Colonial Period. This three-storey tower, which stands 29 meters high, is currently made mainly of bricks and hewn limestone blocks and follows the Baroque-style architecture. The Campanario has suffered destruction from earthquakes that struck the region. The first among these was on July 17, 1787, wherein it has caused major damage to the structure. It was later rebuilt in 1833 under the supervision of the Augustinian friar Fr. Jesse Alvarez. Another earthquake sometime between 1833 and 1881 however caused damages once again to the belfry, which was later restored by the first Bishop of Jaro Msgr. Mariano Cuartero in 1881. The latest was on January 25, 1948, which only suffered minor damages. This was restored by the Iloilo city government and with the supervision of the National Historical Commission of the Philippines (formerly National Historical Institute) in the 1990s. The Jaro Belfry was declared a National Historical Landmark in 1984.

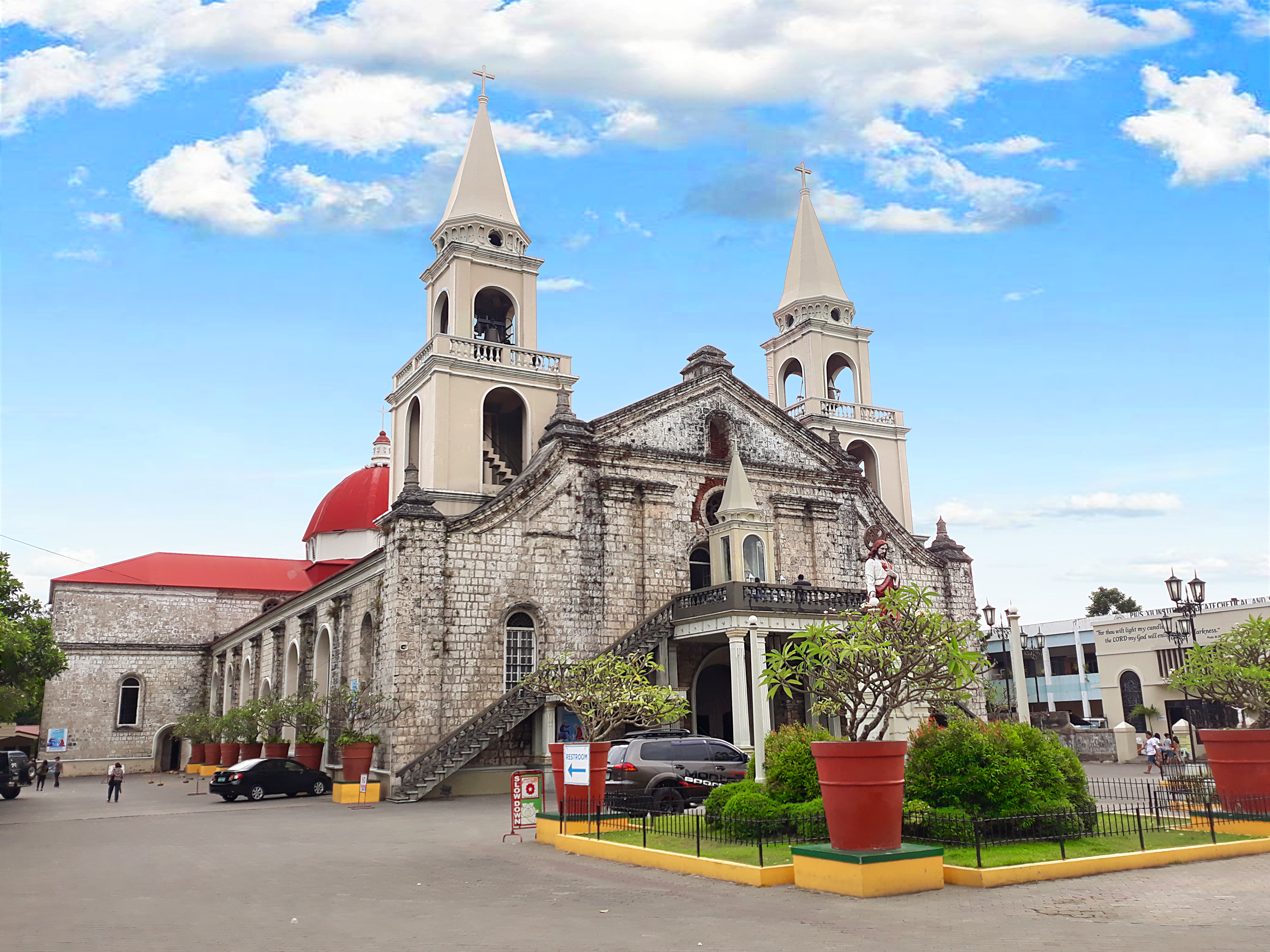
The Jaro Cathedral (National Shrine of Our Lady of Candles)

The Plaza Jaro which is now called the Graciano Lopez Jaena Park, the Plaza Jaro is the center of activity in the district and is surrounded by the Jaro Cathedral, the Campanario de Jaro (Jaro Belfry), several old mansions, the Jaro Evangelical Church, the former Jaro City Hall and the Palacio Arzobispal (Archbishop's Palace).

The notable of the institutions which the Spaniards left in Iloilo is the Jaro Cathedral or Catedral de Jaro. Known as the Church of St. Elizabeth of Hungary or the Jaro Cathedral, the present structure was built in and finished in 1864, the year the district was named a diocese by Pope Pius IX through the order of Mariano Cuartero, the first bishop of Jaro. It was destroyed during the Lady of Caycay earthquake of January 1948 and restored by order of Jose Ma. Cuenco, the first archbishop of Jaro in 1956. The cathedral's style is basically Baroque, with the addition of Gothic elements over many renovations. This has been approved by the CBCP as the National Shrine of Our Lady of Candles, the first Marian dedicated church to have such status outside Luzon. Considered as one of the iconic art deco structures in the country, Municipio de Jaro or Jaro Municipal Hall was built in the 1930s as the City of Jaro's municipal government center. The Jaro Municipal Hall (Municipio de Jaro) is an Art Deco building designed by the Philippine National Artist for Architecture Juan Arellano and was embellished in the facade by an Italian sculptor Francesco Monti. The municipio was previously used as the station of the Philippine National Police in Jaro district.

The National Museum of the Philippines has also declared the Municipio de Jaro as an important cultural property or a National Cultural Treasure. The declaration further implies the structure having "an exceptional art deco design"

The present Municipio de Jaro has been restored and turned into the regional headquarters of the National Museum of the Philippines for Iloilo and Western Visayas.

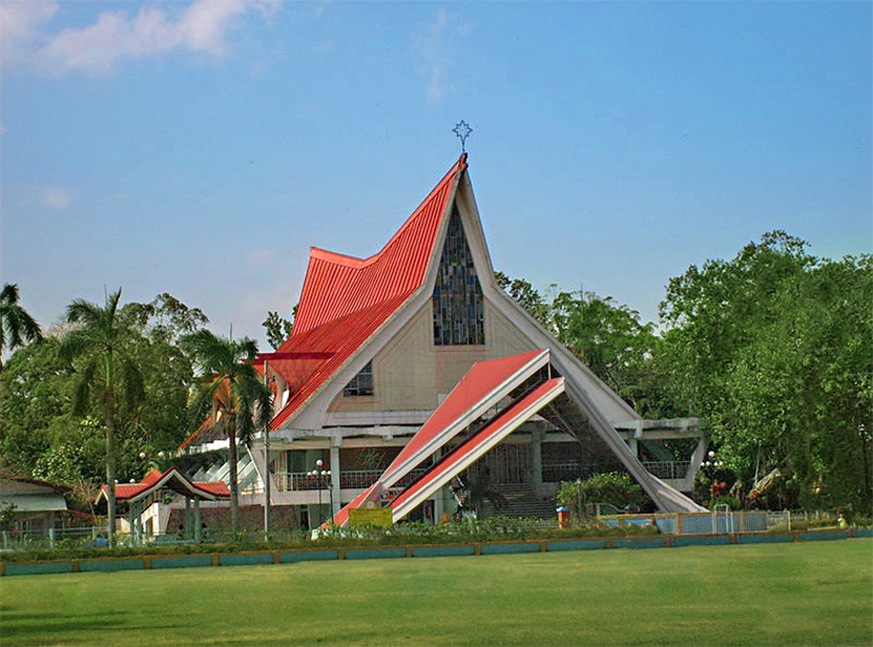
Central Philippine University, founded in 1905 during the early years of American colonization by the American Protestants, is the first Baptist and second American university in the Philippines and in Asia.

The arrival of the Americans in the early 1900s brought with them the Protestant brand of faith, and Central Philippine University is one of the several known institutions built by them. It was founded in 1905 through a grant given by the American industrialist, oil magnate and philanthropist John D. Rockefeller by the American Baptist missionary William Valentine. Central Philippine University is the First university in the City of Jaro and the first Baptist founded and second American university in Asia. The university has more than 40 buildings with some that dates back to the early 20th century possessing American colonial architecture.

The university pioneered the work-study program which was later patterned and followed by other institutions; established the oldest student governing body in Asia, the Central Philippine University Republic; and has established the first nursing school in the Philippines, the Union Mission Hospital Training School for Nurses, the present day Central Philippine University College of Nursing. It has the biggest library collection in Western Visayas and it is also the first university in the Western Visayas that has been declared as a National Landmark/Historical Landmark by the National Historical Commission of the Philippines.

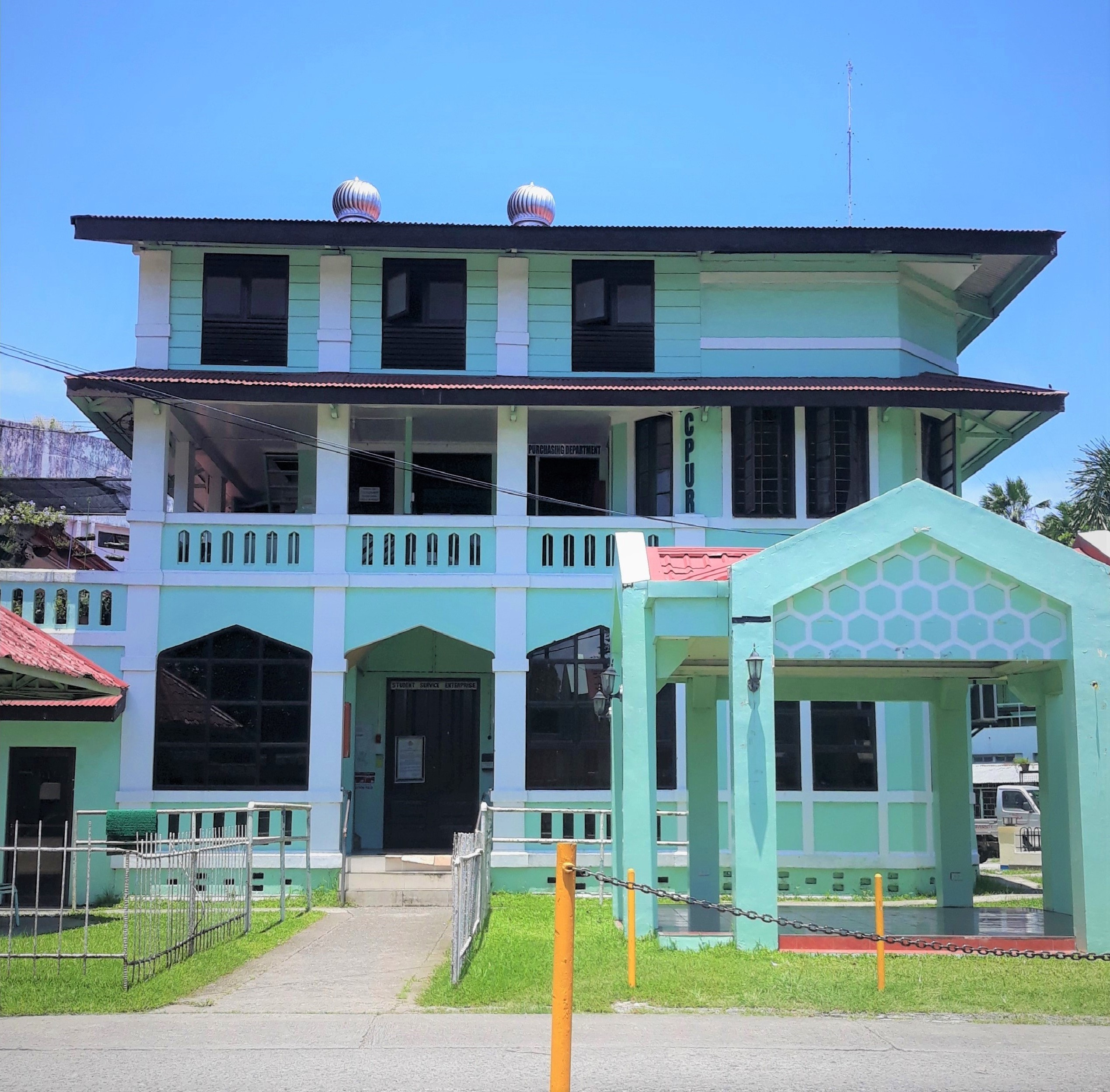
The CPU Republic which houses at the Stuart Hall on the main campus of Central Philippine University is the first and oldest student government in South East Asia.

Some of the heritage structures found within the radius of the Plaza Jaro include:

The Palacio Arzobispal (Archbishop's Palace). The residence of the Archbishop of Jaro, it is located southwest of the Jaro Cathedral and southeast of the Plaza Jaro.

The establishment of church affiliated schools during the Spanish colonial era resulted to the founding of Seminario de San Vicente Ferrer, the first institution of higher learning in Western Visayas and Negros Island. It is located at the back of Ledesma Mansion in Calle Seminario.

Few blocks away from Plaza Jaro is the Mansión de Lopez (Lopez Mansion), also known as Nelly Garden, is regaled as the Queen of all heritage houses and mansions in Iloilo and Panay. One of the known iconic structures of Iloilo, it is one of the colonial mansions found in Jaro built by the Lopez family of Iloilo that founded the broadcasting giant ABS-CBN Corporation.

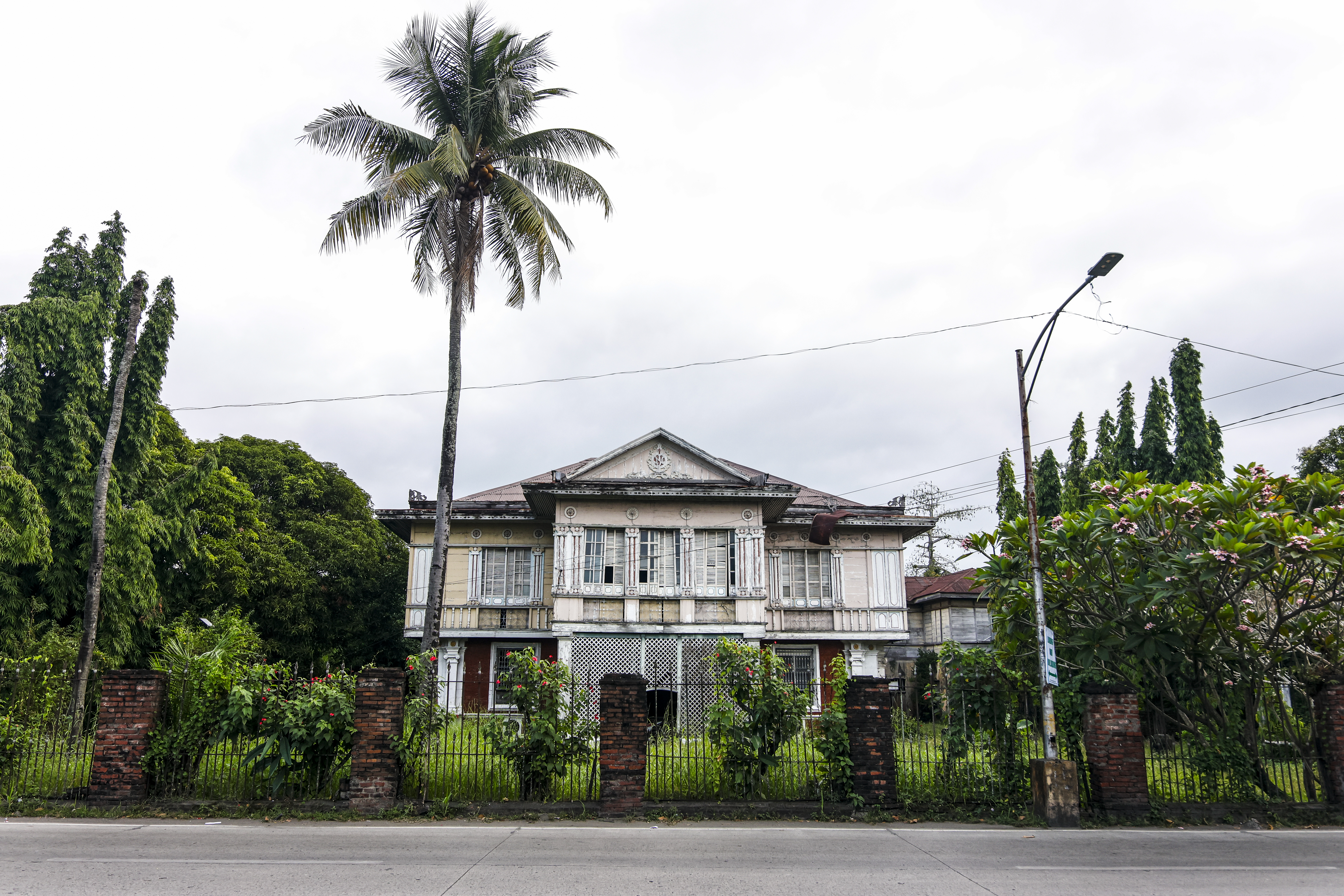
Sanson-Montinola Ancestral House in Jaro, Iloilo City)

The Casa Montinola y Sanson of the Montinolas of Bank of the Philippine Islands located also along the stretch of the E. Lopez Street (the Philippines' first millionaires lane), is a reminiscent of the Gaston house in Silay City, Negros Occidental.

Another notable mansion, the Lizares Mansion, know houses the Angelicum School Iloilo. Built in beaux-arts design, it was once the mansion of the Lizares family but is now turned with all of all of property the mansion stands, into a school by the Dominicans or Order of Preachers. The University of Santo Tomas rolled out a plan to convert it into its Iloilo campus, a move to integrate all UST-Dominican Order run institutions in the Philippines.

Another notable legacy institution built by the Americans is the CPU–Iloilo Mission Hospital. Founded in 1901 as the Sabine Haines Memorial Union Mission Hospital by the Protestant Presbyterian Americans, it is the first and oldest Protestant founded and American hospital in the Philippines. It has established the first Nursing school in the Philippines in 1906, the Union Mission Hospital Training School for Nurses which is the present Central Philippine University College of Nursing.

Some ancestral houses in Jaro

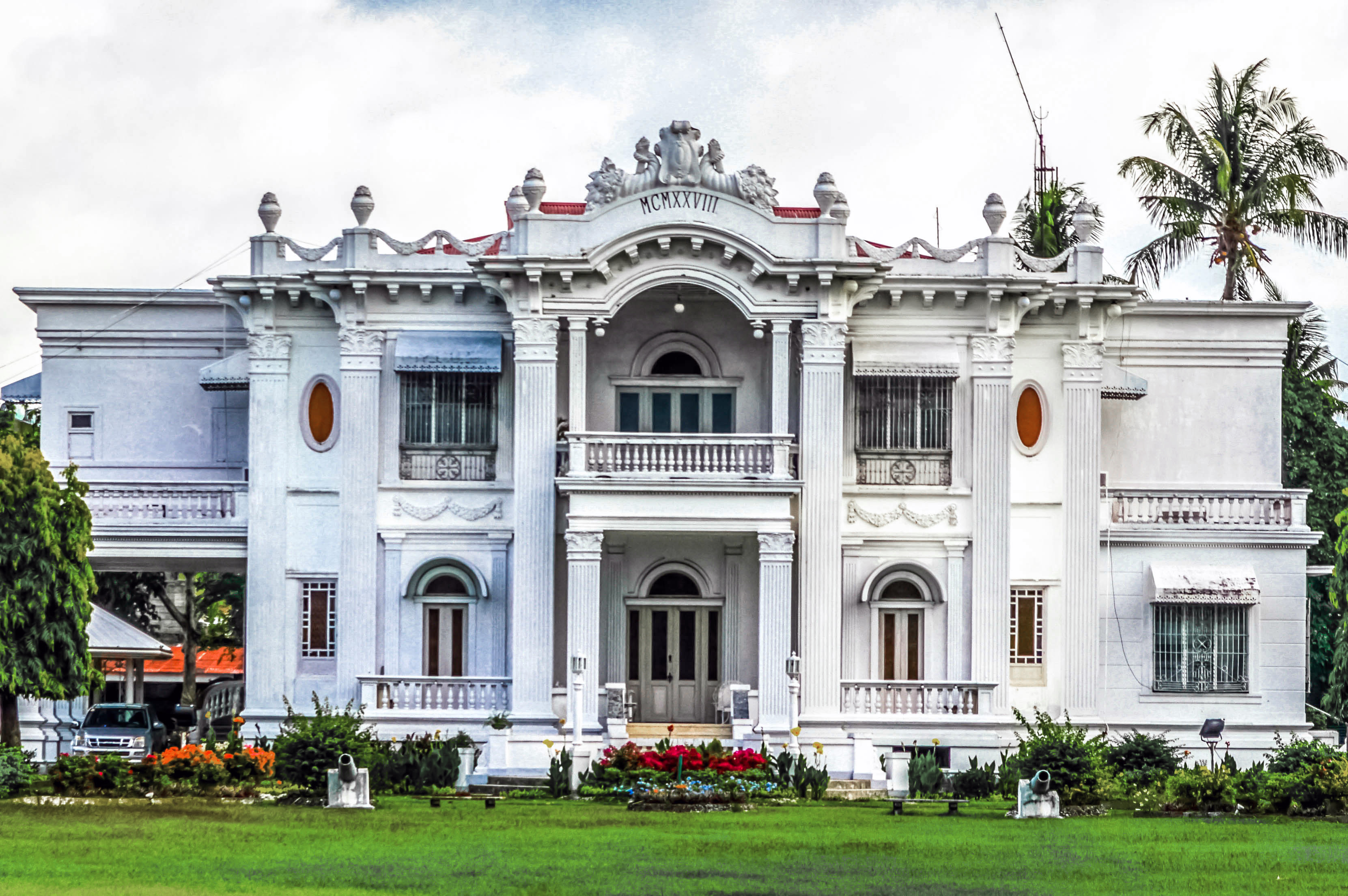
Lopez Mansion (Nelly's Garden)

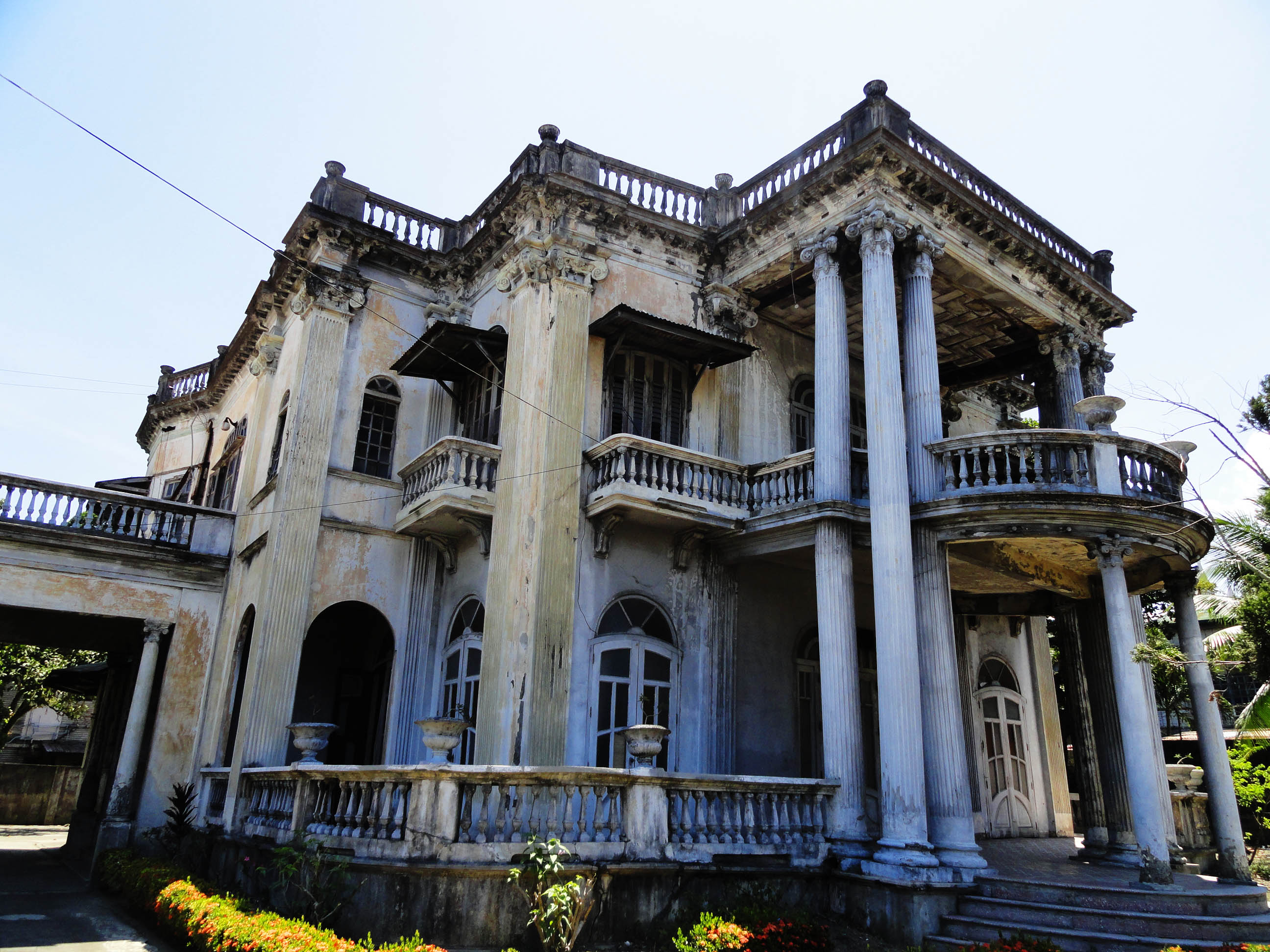
Ledesma Mansion

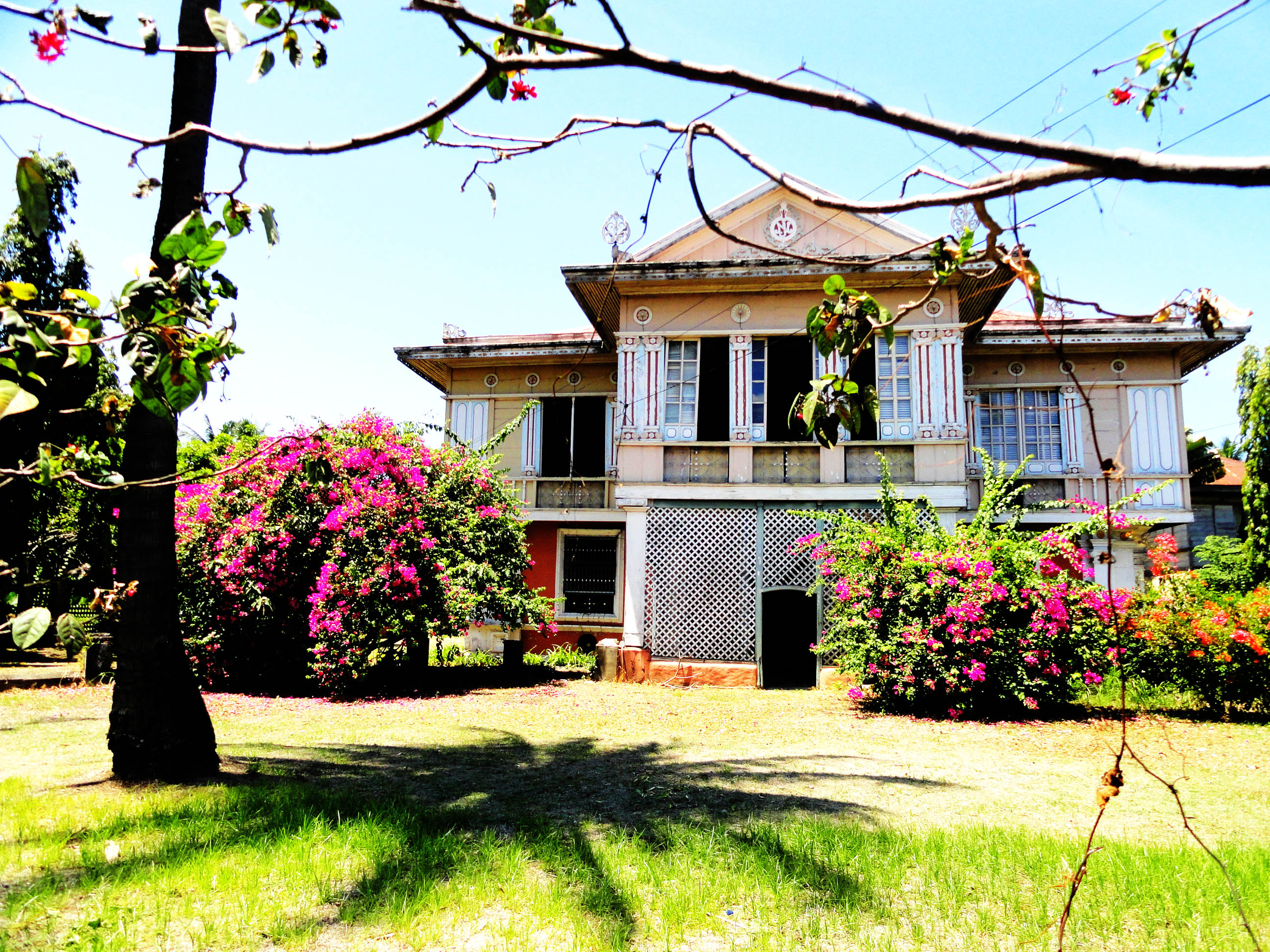
Sanson-Montinola Ancestral House

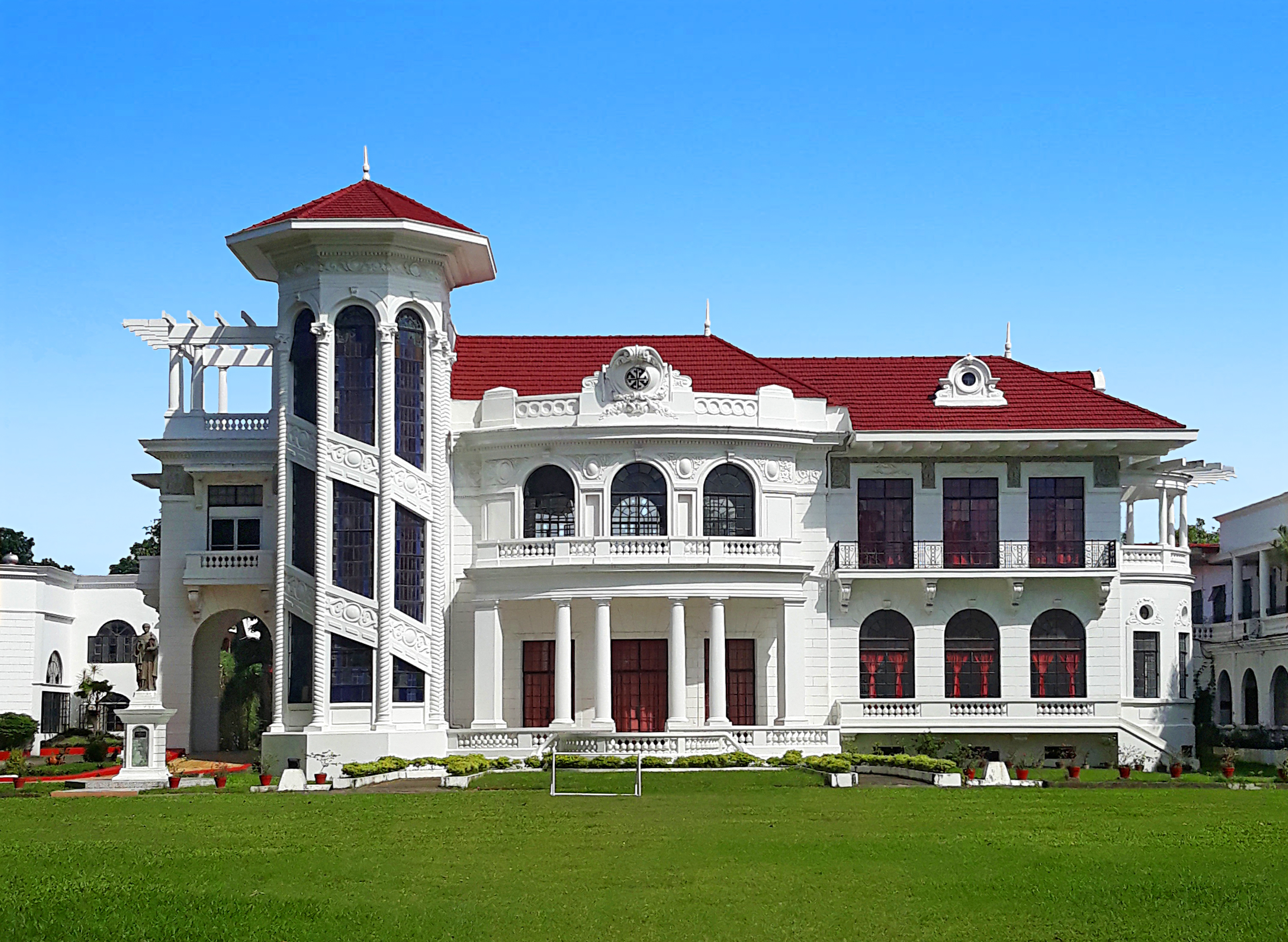
Lizares Mansion

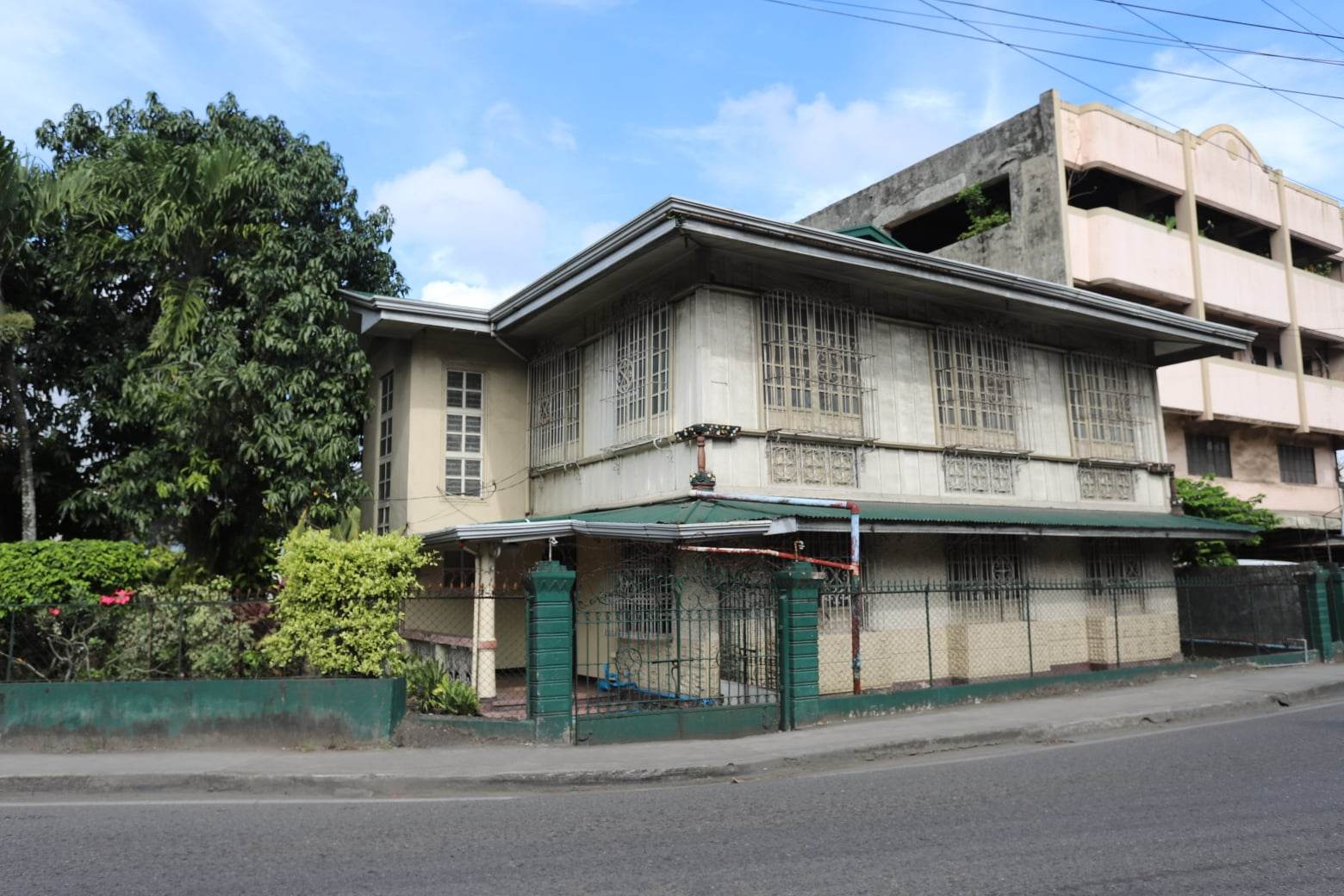
Ledesma Ancestral House

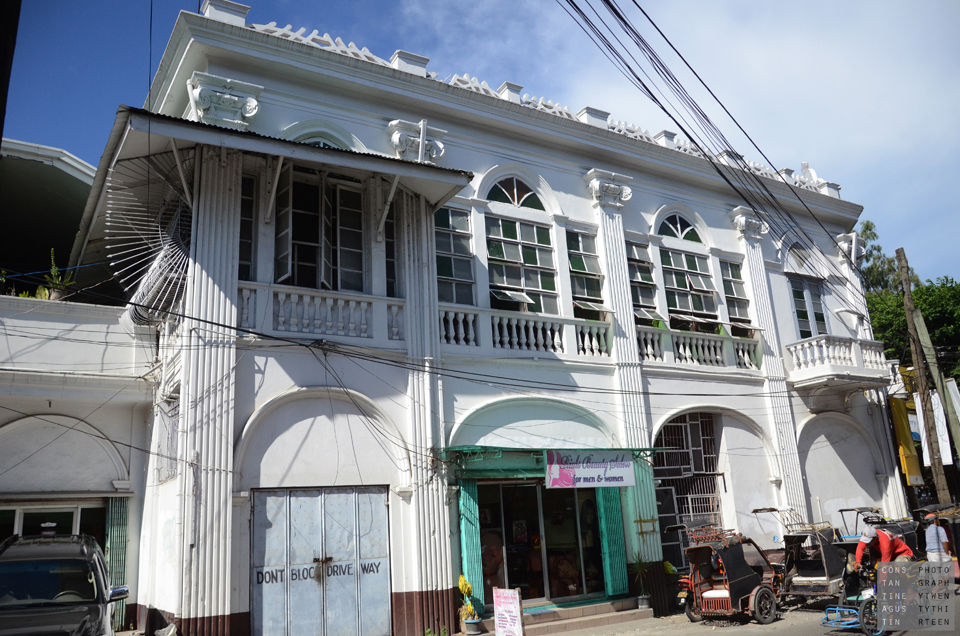
Jalandoni-Montinola House

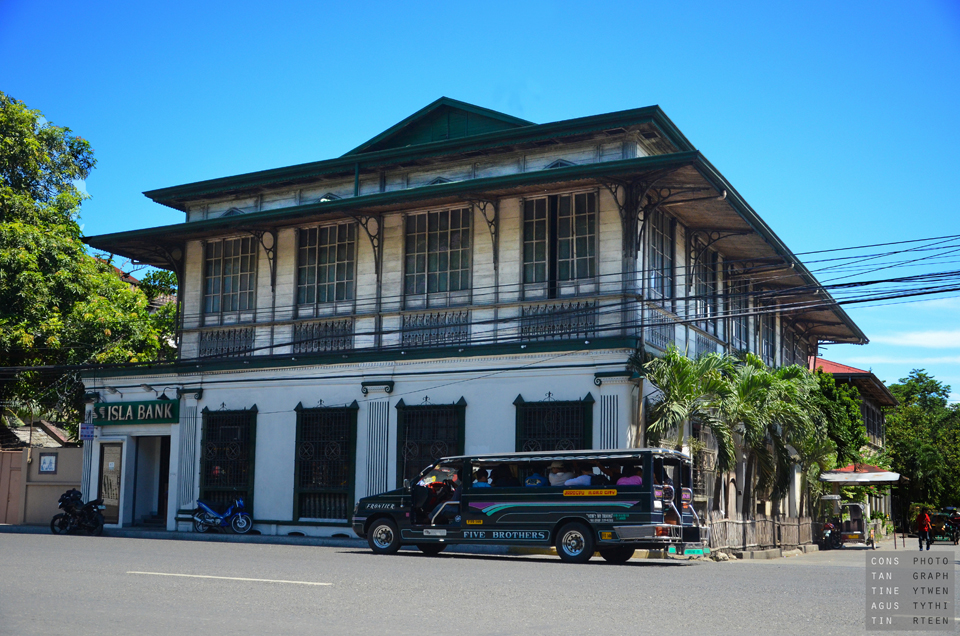
Rafael Lopez-Vito Mansion

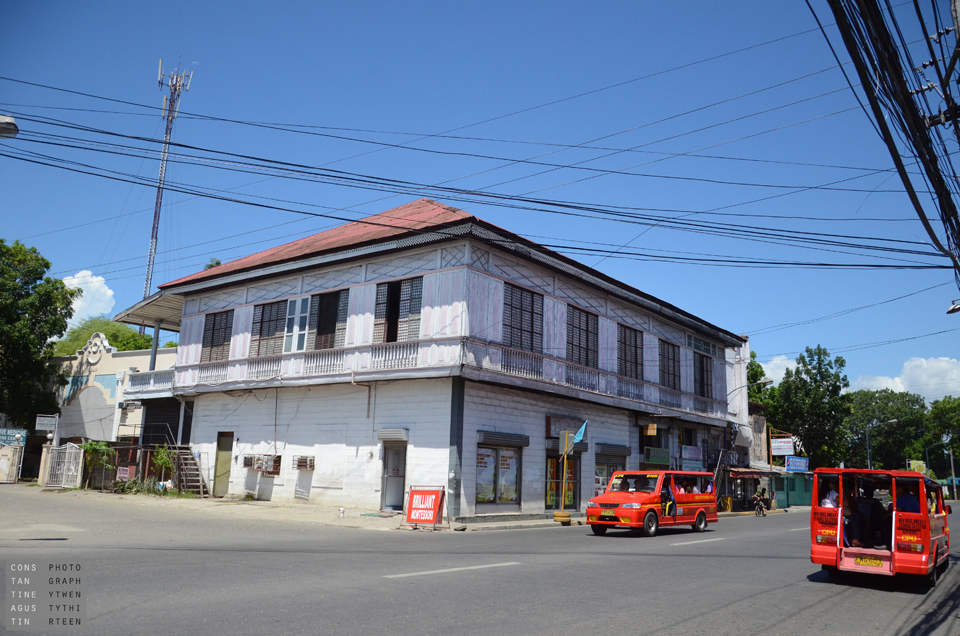
Ramon Villanueva-Lopez Mansion

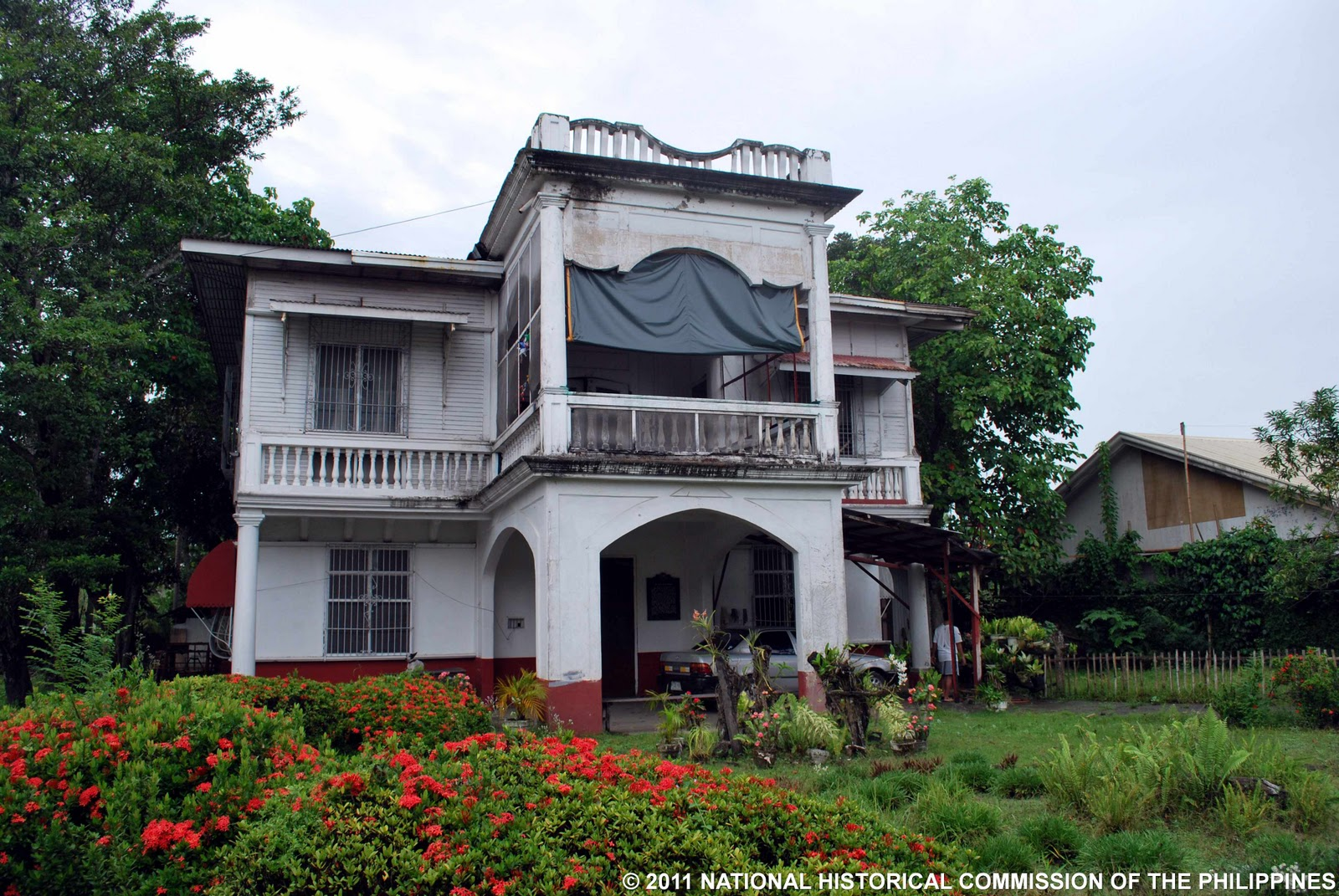
Hechanova Ancestral House

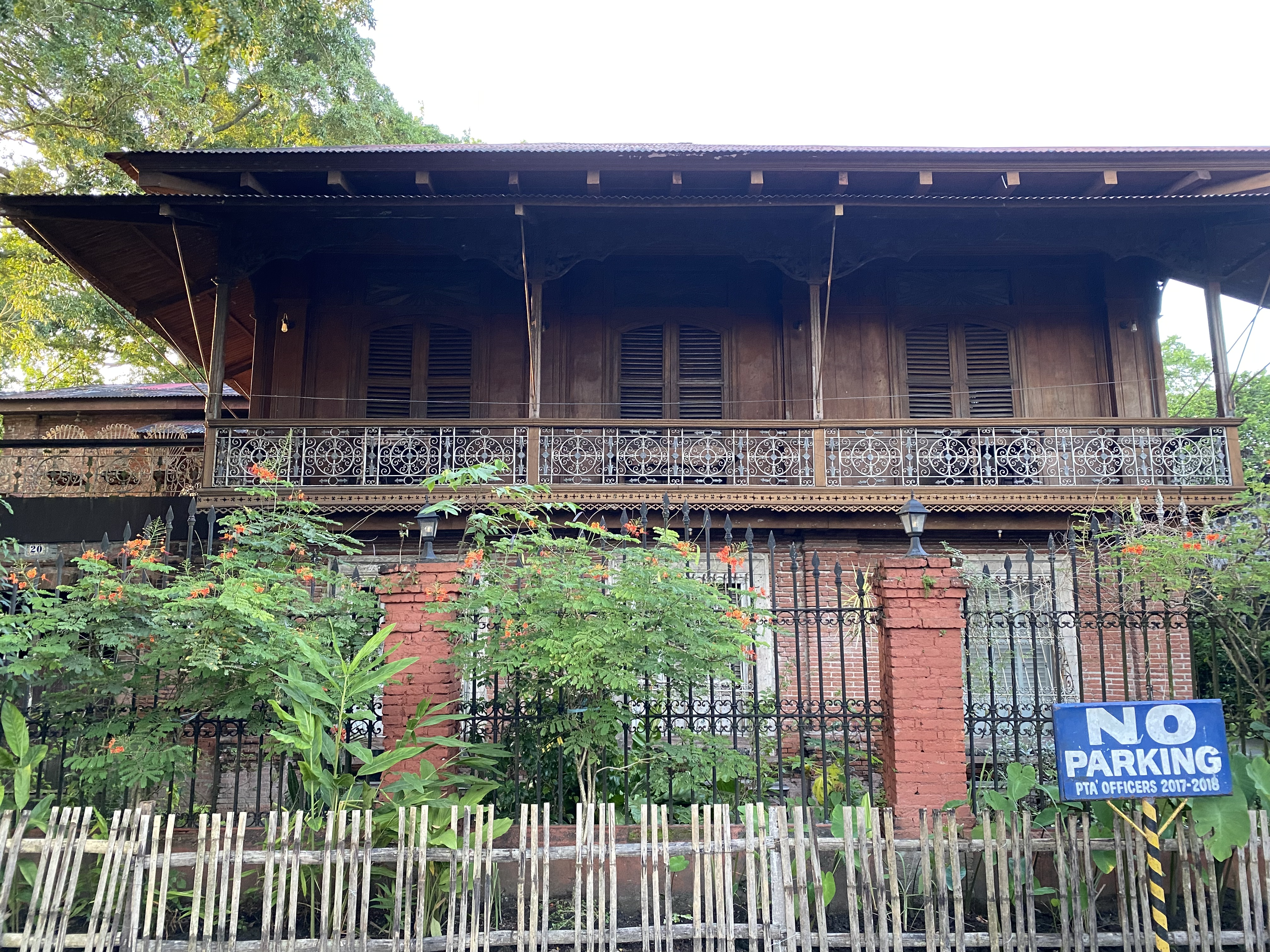
Casa Mariquit

== Education ==
Jaro is home to some of Iloilo's known universities and academic institutions. Notable ones are private founded by the Spanish Catholic and American Protestant missionaries.

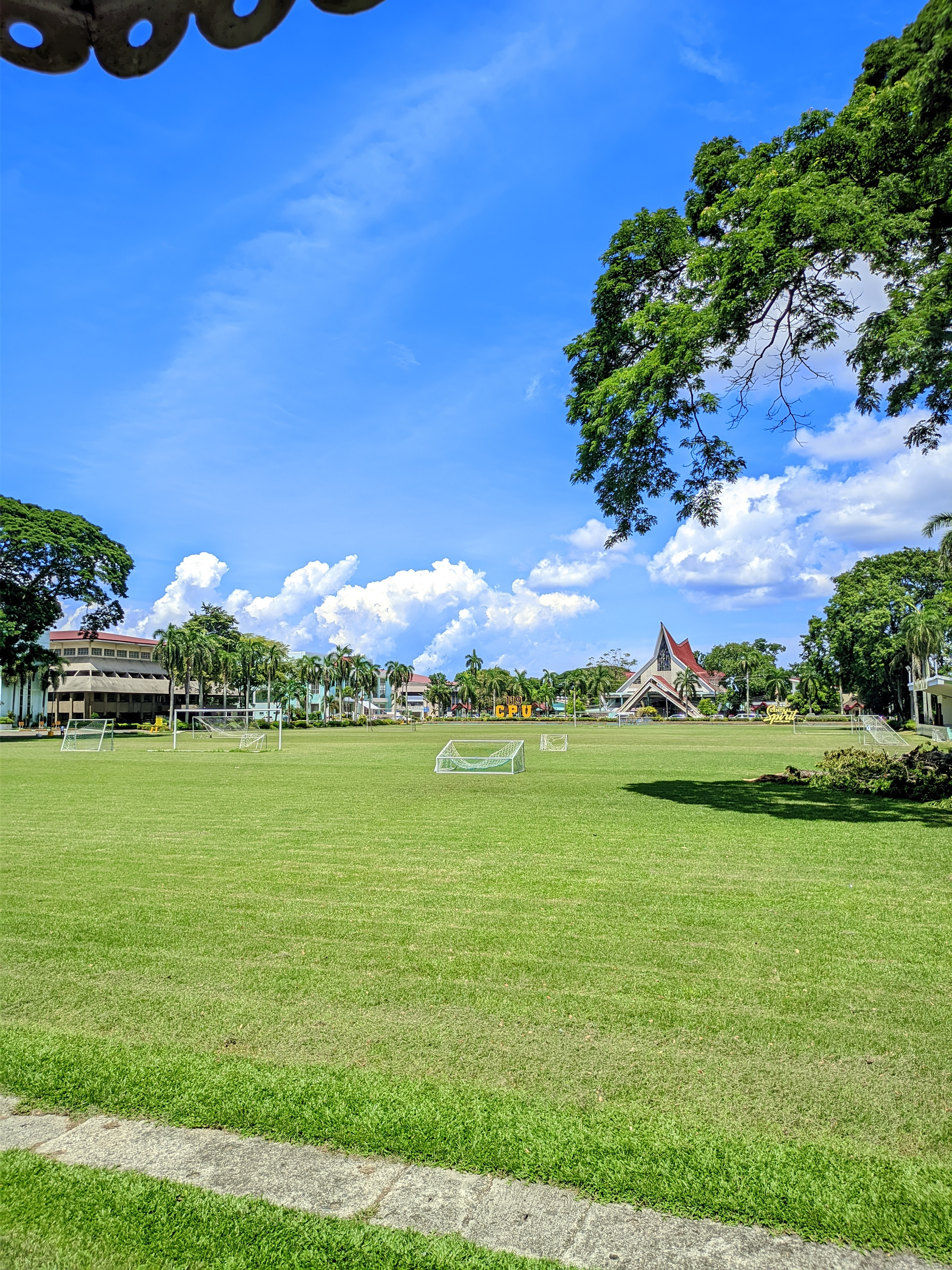
Central Philippine University which was founded as legacy institution of the American titan John D. Rockefeller, is the first Baptist and second American founded university in the Philippines and in Asia. It is the first university in the Western Visayas region to be ranked as one of the best in Asia and the world by Quacquarelli Symonds, one of the renowned and big 3 international university ranking agencies.

Higher education institutions in Jaro include:

- Central Philippine University (founded 1905) – the first Baptist and second American university in the Philippines and Asia founded through a grant given by the American titan oil magnate, John D. Rockefeller.
- Seminario de San Vicente Ferrer (founded 1865) – the oldest institution of higher education in Western Visayas.
- Colegio de San Jose (founded 1872) – The first school for girls in Western Visayas.

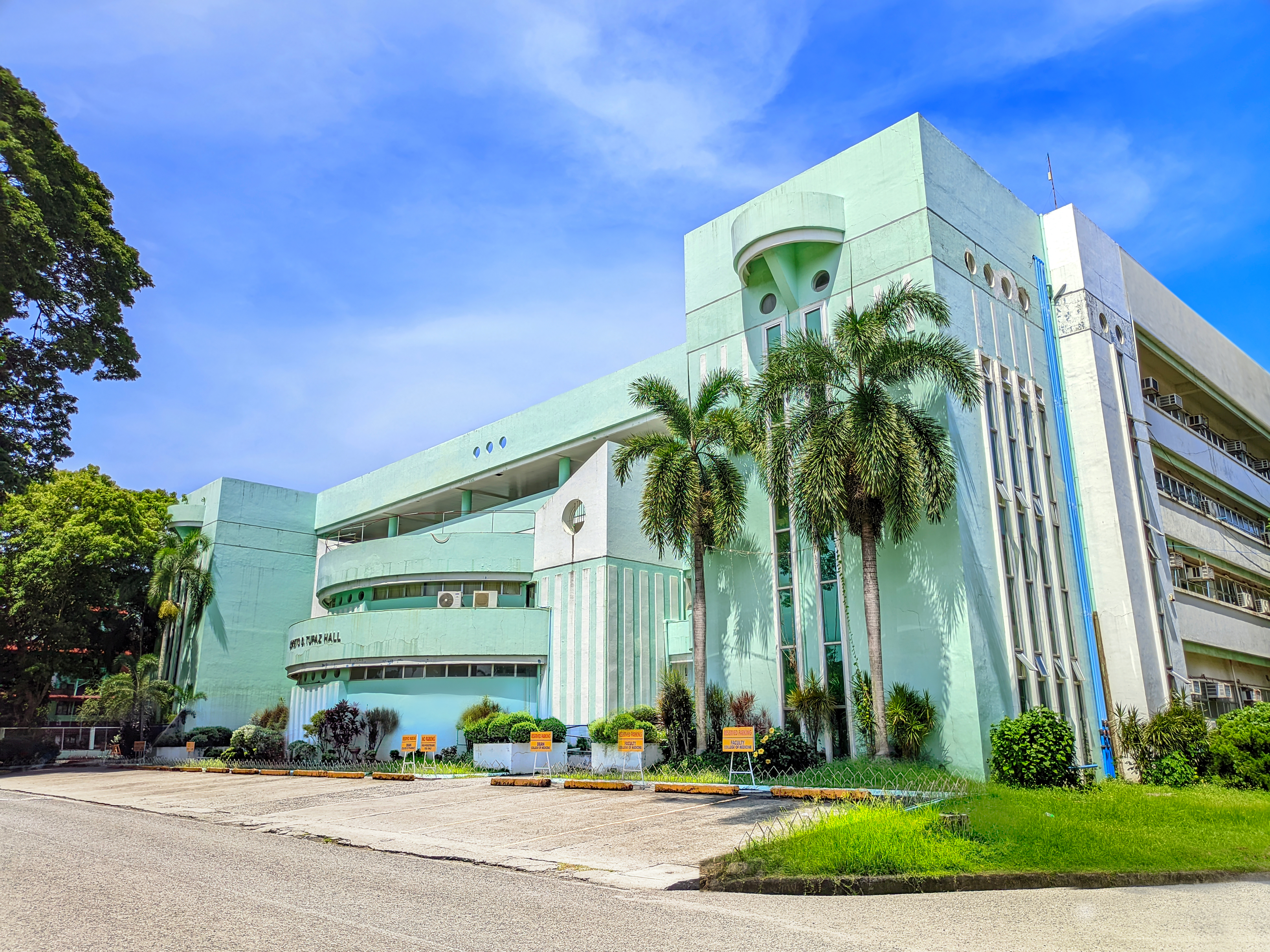
Central Philippine University College of Nursing, the first nursing school in the Philippines established in 1906.

- St. Roberts International College – a quasi basic and higher educational institution.
- Pius XII College Iloilo – the first catechetical school in the Philippines.
- FAST Academy – an aviation school.
- Asian College of Aeronautics (ACA) – an aviation school.

The University of Iloilo – Ungka Campus has been bought a property developer and turned it into a small township with a mall – GT Town Center Iloilo. The De Paul College on the other hand, became defunct and its entire property was bought by the Robinsons Land and turned it into a mall, the Robinsons Place Jaro. A part of De Paul's remaining school building and property has been bought and now occupies the St. Robert's International Academy campus.

Also found in the district is the St. Joseph Regional Seminary, in Cubay. It is a theology seminary, as St. Vincent Seminary is a juniorate and philosophy seminary.

The Department of Education (Philippines) supervises public and private basic education in Jaro under the Iloilo City Schools Division.

Private basic educational institutions include:

- University of San Agustin – Sambag Campus (Founded 1904) – Basic Education Department Campus of the University of San Agustin.
- Central Philippine University Kindergarten, Central Philippine University Elementary School, Junior High School and Central Philippine University Senior High School.
- Angelicum School Iloilo (founded 1978) – Plans of Dominican Province of the Philippines in merging Dominican founded schools will make Angelicum School a University of Santo Tomas – Iloilo campus offering tertiary courses.
- Great International School.
- Mary and Joseph Academy.
- Hua Siong College of Iloilo – Ledesco Campus – first Chinese school outside of Manila.

Public basic educational institutions include the Philippine Science High School Western Visayas Campus (founded 1992), Jaro National High School, RJ Hechanova National High School, Luis Mirasol Memorial School, Jaro I Elementary School, Jaro II Elementary School, Balantang Elementary School, Bitoon Elementary School, and Tacas Elementary School, among others.

== Healthcare ==
The town of Jaro has sufficient healthcare institutions equipped with medical facilities to serve the community. The Iloilo City Health Office operates satellite district and barangay clinics throughout the town, offering various immunization and medical programs for Jaro's residents.

Most of Jaro's healthcare institutions are either owned by churches or are privately operated corporations. Private hospitals in the area include CPU–Iloilo Mission Hospital, Asia Pacific Medical Center – Iloilo (formerly ACE Medical Center – Iloilo), Metro Iloilo Hospital and Medical Center, and CPU Birthing Center.

CPU–Iloilo Mission Hospital, founded in 1901 by Protestant Americans as the Sabine Haines Memorial Union Mission Hospital, holds the distinction of being the oldest functioning hospital in Western Visayas. It is also the country's first American and Protestant hospital. The hospital established the initial nursing school in the Philippines in 1906, which evolved into the present-day Central Philippine University College of Nursing. During the American colonial period, it served as the first hospital for soldiers and constabulary in the Philippines. With around 500 beds, CPU–Iloilo Mission Hospital is a Level III tertiary hospital, encompassing structures like the 2-story Main Hall, the 4-story IMH Medical Arts Building, the 2-story CPU–IMH Medical Education Training Center, the 4-story IMH Centennial Building, and the 7-story IMH Medical Center tower.

Newly constructed private hospitals in Jaro are Asia Pacific Medical Center – Iloilo (formerly ACE Medical Center – Iloilo) and Metro Iloilo Hospital and Medical Center.

The WVSU Medical Center stands as the solitary government-run hospital in Jaro. It operates independently under the administration of West Visayas State University. The Department of Health of the Philippines established and completed an auxiliary healthcare unit for the hospital, known as the WVSU Cancer Center for Western Visayas. Moreover, plans are underway for the construction of the 10-story WVSU Lung, Kidney, and Heart Center for Western Visayas within the hospital premises, overseen by the mentioned government agency.

== Transportation ==
=== Integrated transport terminals ===
Jaro has been a turn-table of civil land transportation in Panay island. The largest enter-city provincial transport terminals in Iloilo City are in Jaro. The Iloilo City Tagbak-Jaro Provincial Perimeter Boundary Terminal (Tagbak Terminal) which serves the routes to and from northern Iloilo and provinces of Capiz and Aklan is the largest. The terminal caters primarily to buses and vans plying various routes in said provinces and area of the province. Few kilometers away is the Jaro-Iloilo Ceres Terminal in Camalig, Jaro, the largest terminal of the bus giant company, Vallacar Transit (Ceres), in Panay.

The Central Iloilo Provincial Perimeter Boundary Terminal (Christ the King/Ungka-Jaro Terminal), serves routes for Central Iloilo – municipalities of Leon, Santa Barbara, New Lucena, Cabatuan, Janiuay, Lambunao, Maasin, Iloilo, Calinog, and province of Capiz municipalities of Tapaz and Jamindan.

=== Public transportation ===
The primary mode of public transportation in Jaro are PUJs or Public Utility Jeepneys. The largest and famous jeepney routes in Iloilo City are the Jaro CPU and Jaro CPU Ungka UI which serves the Ungka/Pavia Terminal to Parola (City Proper) via Central Philippine University.

The city's government in concordat with the jeepney modernization plan in phasing out old jeepneys in the country of the Philippine government, has adopted the program by initially rolling-out a number of modern public jeepneys plying the Jaro CPU Iloilo City and Jaro CPU Ungka UI (Robinsons Place Pavia) routes.

There are also taxis in the district served by private operators.

=== Bicycling ===
Iloilo City is dubbed as the Bike Capital of the Philippines. A network of protected bike lanes of the long stretch of Diversion Road which traverses in the Jaro areas of Barangay Dungon A, back of Central Philippine University, Dungon B, Sambag and Ungka (Jaro), is one of the longest roads with bicycle lane in the country. It stretches up to the district of Mandurriao in the Iloilo Esplanade 1 and 3.

The Iloilo City bicycle lane network is further expanded in some areas in Jaro including the district's part of Circumferential Road (C1) and Plaza Jaro to Casa Real de Iloilo (Provincial Capitol).

=== Airport and seaport ===
Jaro which is part of Iloilo City is also served by a seaport and airport. The Port of Iloilo serves domestic shipping and cargo routes to/from Manila, Cebu, Puerto Princesa, Bacolod, Cagayan de Oro, Zamboanga City, Davao and General Santos. The Iloilo International Cargo Port in Loboc, Lapuz district, is a port of call for foreign cargo vessels. The Iloilo International Airport in the northern town of Cabatuan, Iloilo, is the primary airport serving Metro Iloilo and Guimaras. It serves domestic air routes to Manila, Clark, Cebu, Cuyo Island, Puerto Princesa, Sipalay, Cagayan de Oro, General Santos and Davao City. It is also served by international routes to and from Singapore and Hong Kong.

== Notable people ==
Jaro has produced or is associated with people who became prominent and distinguished in their fields of services. Associated Jareños are the town's people who are not citizens by birth or who stayed in Jaro either as professors, staff or studied in its academic institutions; took a residence for a short or long period of time in the district; and other factors. Few of the notable Jareños include:

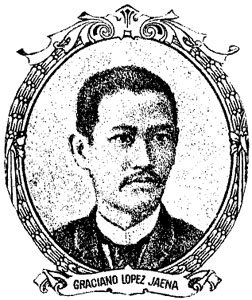
Graciano López Jaena, Filipino journalist, orator, reformist and national hero who is well known for his newspaper, La Solidaridad .

- Graciano López Jaena – Philippine national hero, orator, writer, and propagandist, who is well known in publishing the La Solidaridad.
- Fernando López – former vice-president of the Philippines and brother of Eugenio Lopez Sr.
- Eugenio Lopez Sr. – former Chairman of the Lopez Group of Companies.
- Eugenio Lopez Jr. – former Chairman Emeritus of ABS-CBN.
- Eugenio Lopez III – present Chairman of ABS-CBN.
- Grace Poe – Filipino Senator.
- Raul M. Gonzalez – former Secretary of Justice of the Philippines.
- William Valentine – founder of Central Philippine University, the first Baptist and second American university in the Philippines and Asia.
- Magdalena Jalandoni – Hiligaynon poet.
- Jaime Cardinal Sin – former Archbishop of Jaro and Archbishop of Manila. One of the most iconic persona during EDSA People Power that ousted the former Philippine President Ferdinand Marcos which ended the Martial Law in the Philippines in 1986.
- Miriam Defensor-Santiago – Filipino senator and the first Asian to be elected as a member of International Criminal Court.
- Franklin Drilon – Senator.
- Francis Jardeleza – Associate Justice, Supreme Court of the Philippines; former Solicitor General.
- Alexis Belonio – Scientist and inventor. First Filipino laureate or awardee of the prestigious Rolex Award for Enterprise.
- Leonor Orosa-Goquingco – National Artist for Dance.
- Perfecto Yasay – Foreign Affairs Secretary.
- Patrocinio Gamboa – Filipina revolutionary during the Philippine revolution against the Spanish rule. Involved in the historical first hoisting of Philippine flag outside Luzon in Santa Barbara, Iloilo.
- Manuel Araneta Jr. – Filipino basketball player who competed in the 1948 Summer Olympics; father of Liza Araneta-Marcos, First Lady of the Philippines.

== See also ==
- Jaro Cathedral
- Archdiocese of Jaro
- Nuestra Señora de la Candelaria de Jaro
- López family of Iloilo
