= Gamboa (name) =

Gamboa is a surname of Basque origin. Notable people with the surname include:

== Art and entertainment ==
- Diane Gamboa (born 1957), American artist
- Erlantz Gamboa (born 1946), Basque writer
- Harry Gamboa Jr. (born 1951), Mexican-American writer and artist
- Helen Gamboa (born 1945), Filipino actress and singer
- Hernán Gamboa (1946–2016), Venezuelan musician
- Isaías Gamboa (1872–1904), Colombian poet
- Isaias Gamboa (music producer) (born 1963), Costa Rican-American music producer and author
- Joross Gamboa (born 1984), Filipino actor and model
- Juan Pablo Gamboa (born 1966), Colombian actor
- Oscar Perdomo Gamboa (born 1974), Colombian writer
- Santiago Gamboa (born 1965), Colombian writer

== Crime ==
- Gregorio Sauceda-Gamboa (born ca. 1965), Mexican drug trafficker
- Héctor Manuel Sauceda Gamboa (died 2009), Mexican mob boss

== Exploration ==
- Martín Ruiz de Gamboa (1533–1590), Spanish Basque conquistador
- Pedro Sarmiento de Gamboa (1532–1592), Spanish explorer, historian, and scientist

== Politics ==
- Emilio Gamboa Patrón (born 1950), Mexican politician
- Joaquín Gamboa Pascoe, Mexican politician and union leader
- Lizbeth Gamboa Song (born 1981), Mexican politician
- Pablo Gamboa Miner (born 1986), Mexican politician
- Raúl Ríos Gamboa (born 1973), Mexican politician
- Roberto Colín Gamboa (born 1956), Mexican politician

== Sports ==
=== Baseball ===
- Alec Gamboa (born 1997), American baseball player
- Eddie Gamboa (born 1984), American baseball player
- Tom Gamboa (born 1948), American baseball coach and manager

=== Boxing ===
- Julio Gamboa (born 1971), Nicaraguan boxer
- Yuriorkis Gamboa (born 1981), Cuban boxer

=== Football (soccer) ===
- Cristian Gamboa (born 1989), Costa Rican footballer
- Delio Gamboa (1936–2018), Colombian footballer
- Fernando Gamboa (born 1970), Argentine footballer
- Francisco Gamboa (footballer) (born 1985), Mexican footballer
- Francisco Castro Gamboa (born 1990), Chilean footballer
- João Gamboa (born 1996), Portuguese footballer
- Ludovic Gamboa (born 1986), French footballer
- Miguel Ángel Gamboa (born 1951), Chilean footballer

=== Other sports ===
- Anibal Gamboa (1948–2020), Venezuelan chess master
- Jorge Gamboa, Chilean cyclist
- Laura Gamboa (born 2008), Brazilian rhythmic gymnast

== Other ==
- Francisco Javier Carrillo Gamboa, Mexican academic
- Graciano Ricalde Gamboa (1873–1942), Mexican mathematician
- Patrocinio Gamboa (1865–1953), Filipino revolutionary
- Pearlasia Gamboa, Filipino-American businesswoman

== See also ==
- Gambone, surname
- Gamboa (disambiguation)
- Gambo (disambiguation)
