= Garibay =

Garibay is a surname of Basque origin. It is the Castillianization of the Basque Garibai.

== Origins ==
Like many Basque surnames, Garibai is descriptive of the original family house. Gari means "wheat" while "hibai" means river. So the house was proximal to a river where wheat grew. Indeed, Garibai is a neighborhood north of Oñati. The coat of arms of the town of Oñati reflects the families that have had historical relevance. It is divided into three parts. In the upper two are represented, on the left an eagle as a symbol of the Gamboine family of the Garibai, the Eagles; In the right a deer is represented in the attitude of running, as a symbol of the Oroñina family of the Murguía, the Deer. The lower quarter is occupied by a wounded deer on a wheat field and on it an eagle with its claws and beak eating at the heart. This symbolizes a medieval battle that was lost by the Oñacinos, in which the Murguía were exterminated. Formerly it had the legend " Zara bay. - Zeren bay? - "Gari bay " ("Pledge yourself! - To who? - The wheat"). This shield was of the family of Garibay and was adopted by the town in 1775 to replace another one that had Saint Michael striking down the devil.

Blason of the Garibay (Gipuzkoa) family

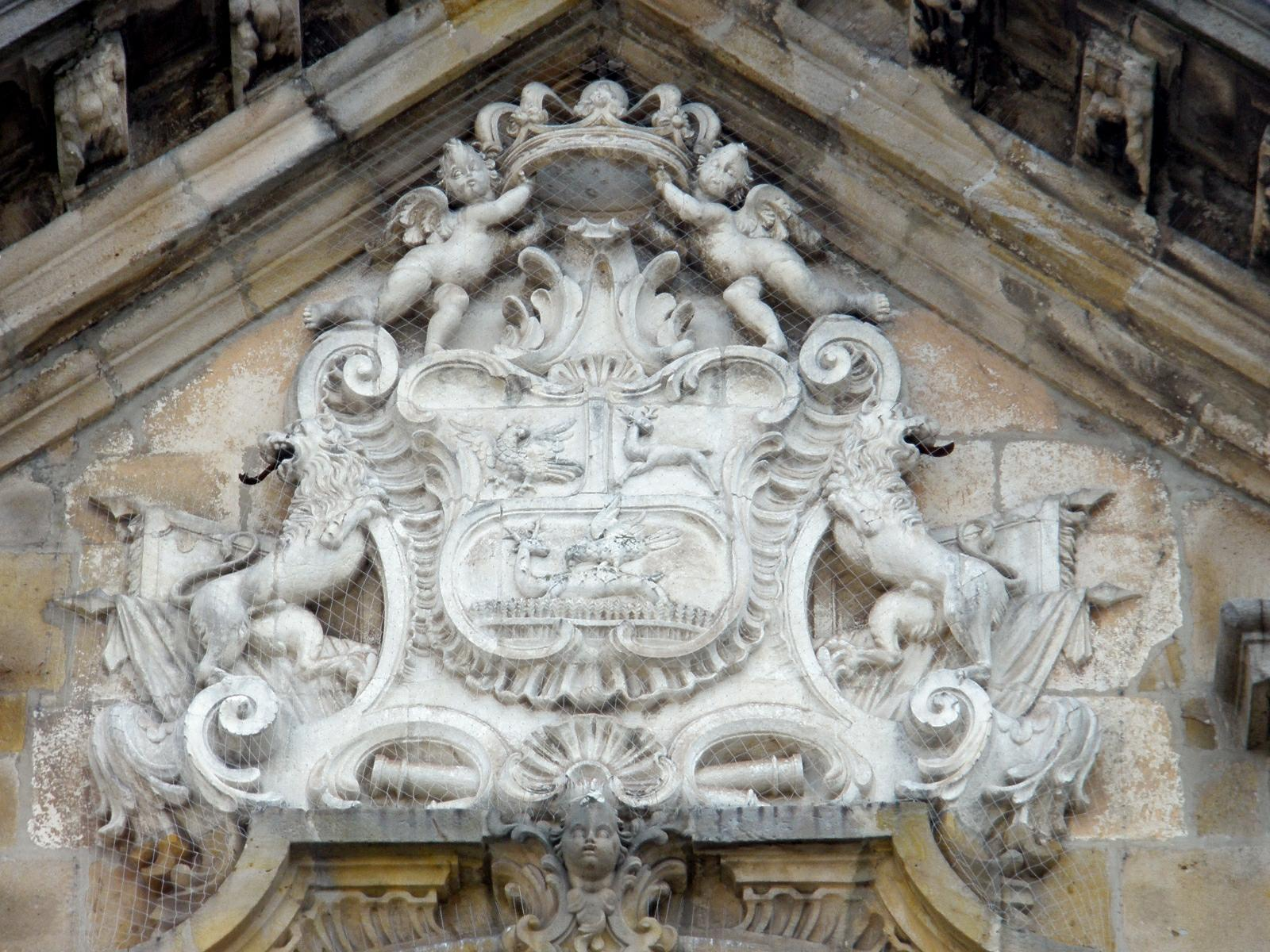
Oñate - Ayuntamiento 4

== Notable people ==
- Ángel María Garibay K. (1892–1967), Mexican Roman Catholic priest, philologist, linguist, historian, scholar of pre-Columbian Mesoamerican cultures
- Daniel Garibay (born 1973), Mexican Major League Baseball player
- Danny Garibay, American record producer
- Emmanuel Garibay (born 1962), Filipino figurative artist
- Esteban de Garibay (1533–1600), writer, historian of the Spanish court
- Fernando Garibay, American music producer, DJ, and songwriter
- Jonathan Garibay (born 1999), American football player
- Pedro de Garibay (1729–1815), Spanish military officer and viceroy of New Spain
- Ricardo Garibay (1923–1999), Mexican writer and journalist
- Victor Estrada Garibay (born 1971), Mexican taekwondo practitioner and Olympic medalist

== See also ==
- Gariépy
