= Gamboa =

Gamboa may refer to:

== People ==
- Gamboa (name), a list of people with the surname

== Places ==
- Gamboa Airport, Castro, Chile
- Gamboa, Panama, a town in Colón Province, Panama
- Gamboa, Praia, a neighborhood in Praia, Cape Verde
- Gamboa, Rio de Janeiro, a neighborhood
- Gamboa (crater), a crater on Mars

== See also ==
- Ullíbarri-Gamboa, a hamlet in the Basque Country, Spain
