= Jaro Plaza =

Public plaza in Jaro, Iloilo City

Graciano Lopez Jaena Park
- Jaro Plaza; Plaza Jaro (Spanish)
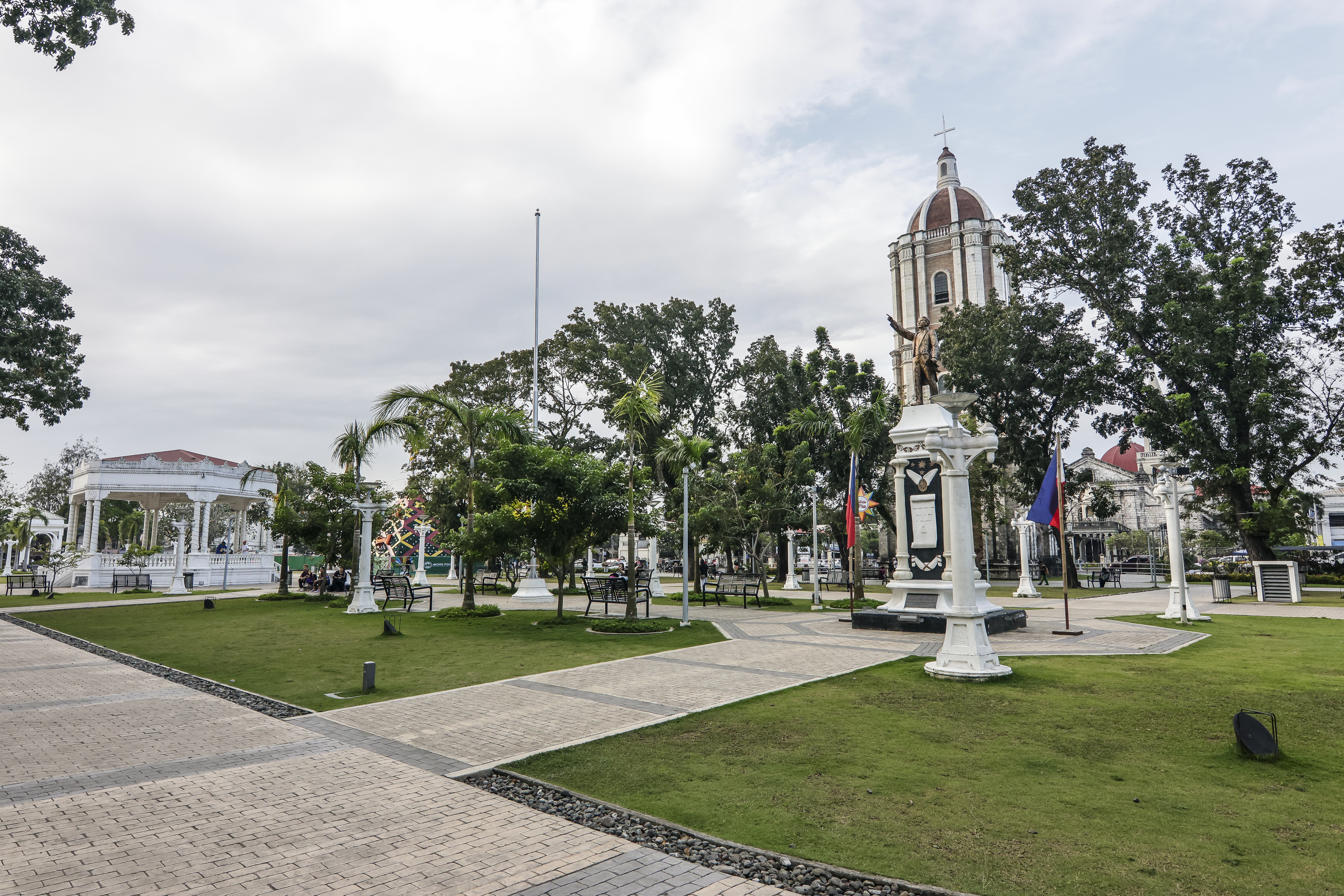
- Jaro Plaza with the statue of Graciano Lopez Jaena, the Jaro Belfry on the right side, and the Plaza Bandstand on the left
- Interactive map of Graciano Lopez Jaena Park
- Type: Urban park, town square
- Location: Plaza Rizal St., Jaro, Iloilo City, Philippines
- Coordinates: 10°43′27.72″N 122°33′26.38″E
- Area: 2.1 hectares (5.2 acres)
- Etymology: Graciano Lopez Jaena
- Operator: Iloilo City Government

Graciano Lopez Jaena Park, also known as Jaro Plaza or Plaza Jaro in Spanish or local, is an urban park and town square located in the district of Jaro in Iloilo City, Panay Island, Philippines.

== History ==
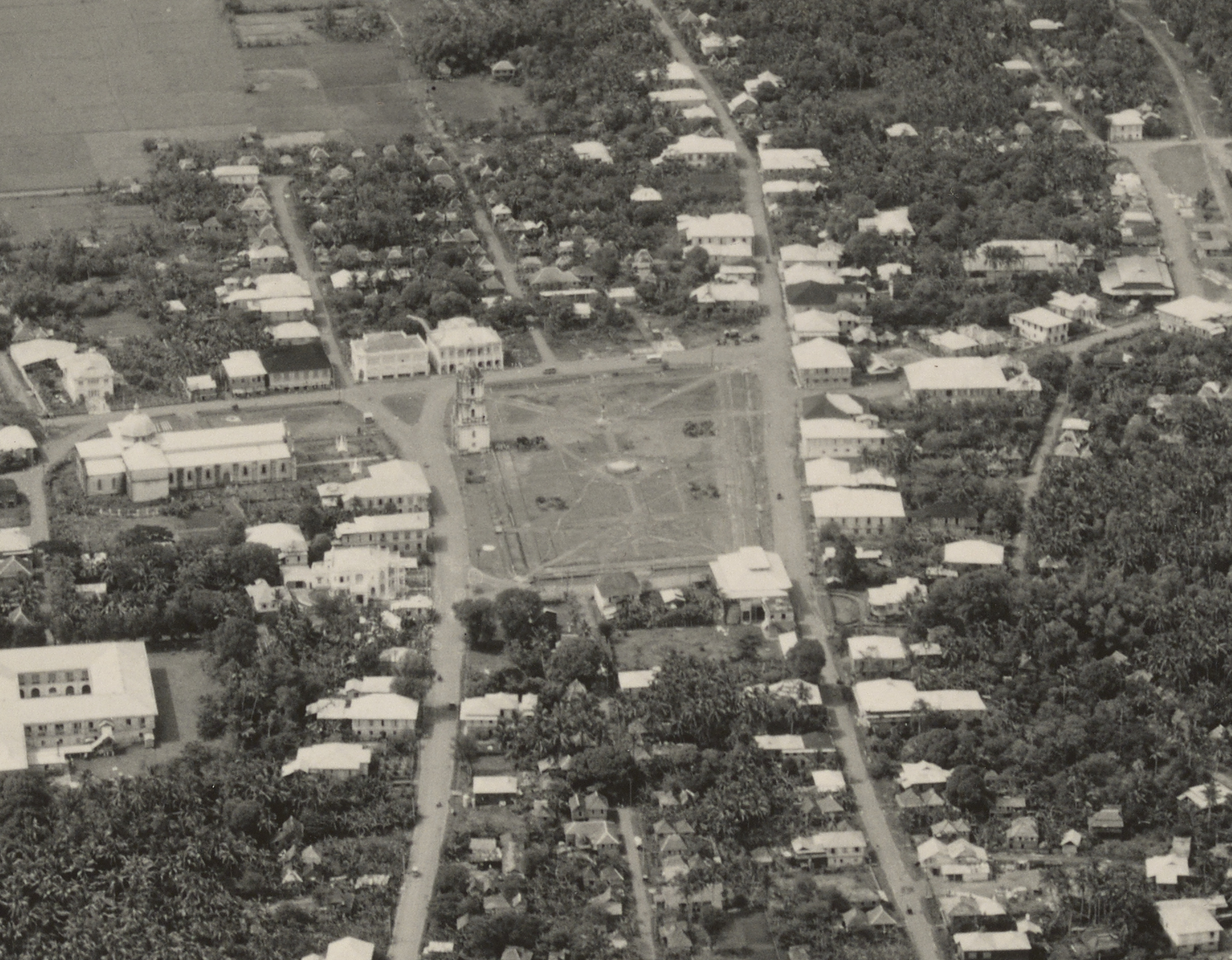
Aerial view of Jaro Plaza, circa 1940s

Jaro Plaza was designed by Father Juan Aguado, with construction overseen by Demetrio Ledesma, who later became Presidente Municipal. In the 1930s, the plaza earned the reputation of being one of the most beautiful plazas on Panay Island, featuring an arch, hedges, bandstand, and benches that added to its appeal.

Conservation efforts, including those initiated by the government under the Heritage Law (Republic Act 10555), have been undertaken to restore the historical landmarks of Iloilo City, including Jaro Plaza. Republic Act No. 10555, authored by Mayor Jerry Treñas during his tenure as a congressman, with support from former Senator Frank Drilon, declared Jaro Plaza as one of the Cultural Heritage Tourism Zones, alongside Jaro Cathedral, Molo Church, Fort San Pedro, Molo Plaza, Plaza Libertad, and the Iloilo City Old Central Business District.

== Restoration and beautification ==
In the 2020s, a comprehensive beautification and restoration project was launched for Jaro Plaza, with a budget of P20 million. The restoration efforts aimed to revive the park's former charm and historical significance. The National Historical Commission was involved in overseeing the restoration project.

As part of the restoration, the 29-meter free-standing Jaro Belfry, a prominent feature of Jaro Plaza, underwent significant repairs. On November 27, 2022, the National Historical Commission officially turned over the Jaro Belfry to the Archdiocese of Jaro and the city government, marking a significant milestone in the restoration process.

The park now showcases the monument to Ilonggo veterans from World War II and the well-preserved bandstand, both of which contribute to its historical appeal.

Additionally, a new shrine of Patrocinio Gamboa was installed in the plaza. Known as the "Heroine of Jaro," Patrocinio Gamboa played a pivotal role in delivering the Philippine flag, the first outside of Luzon, to the Santa Barbara headquarters of General Martin Delgado, just in time for the revolutionary government's inauguration.

Monuments and memorials

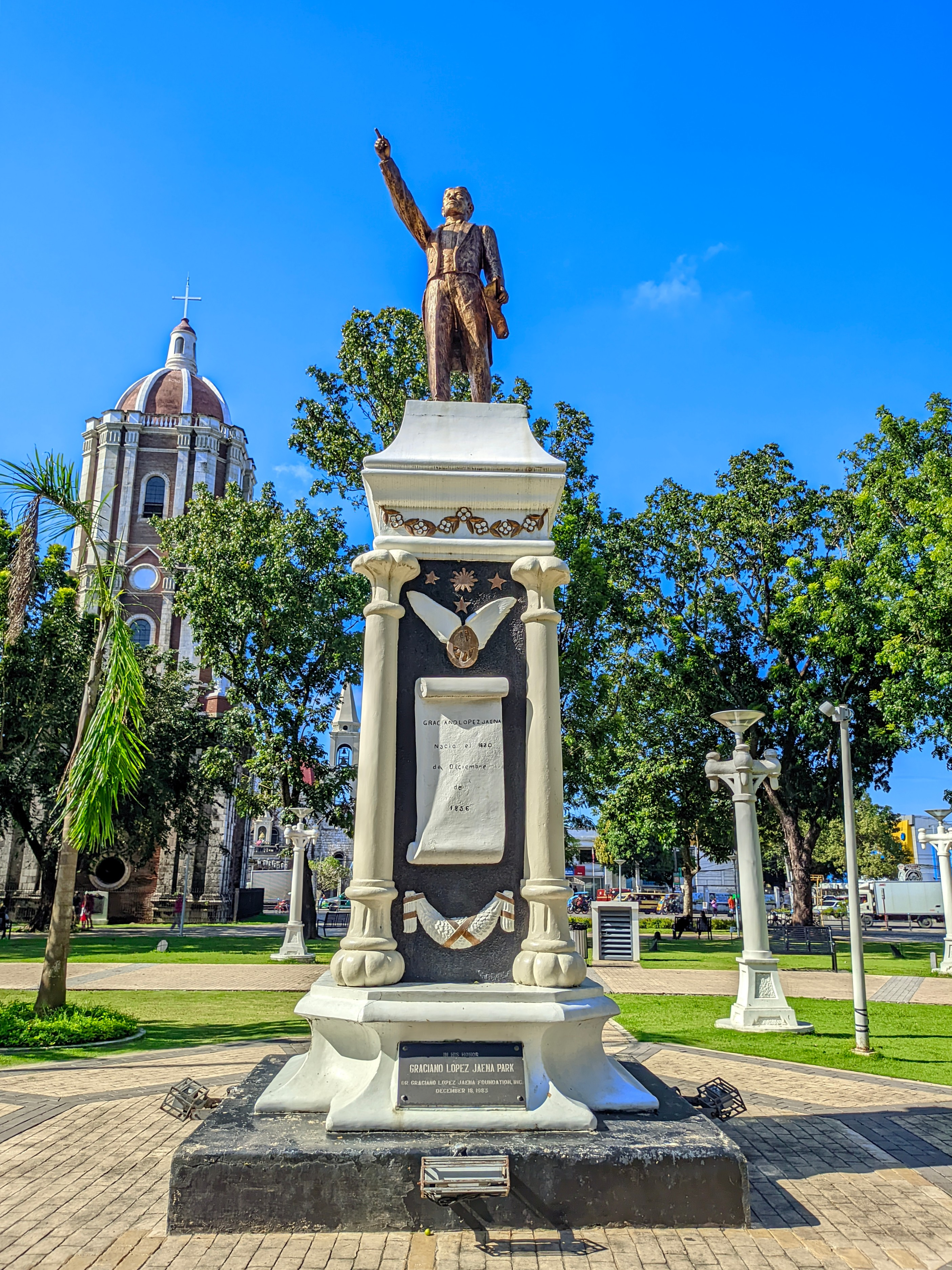
Graciano Lopez Jaena Monument

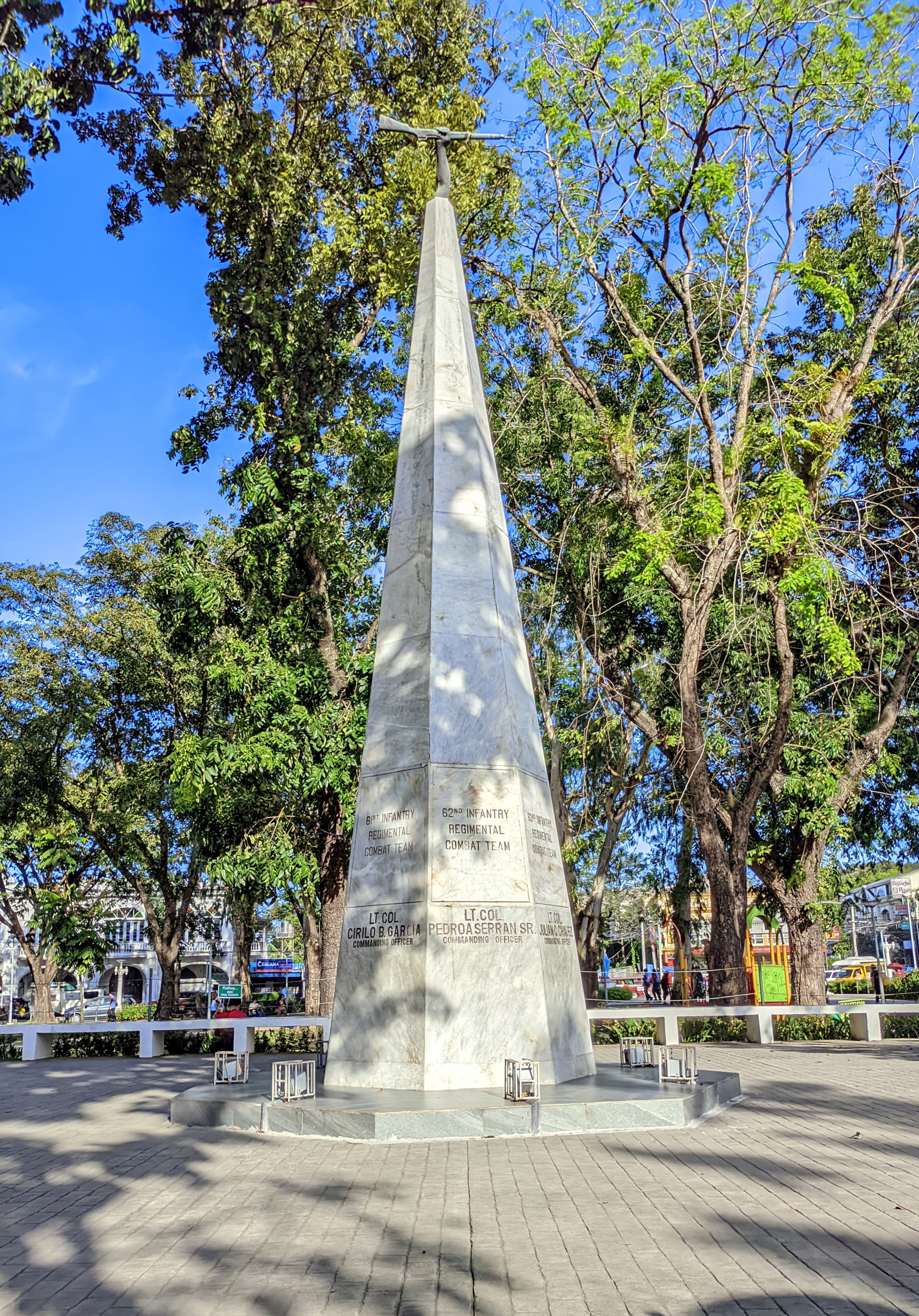
World War II Memorial Monument

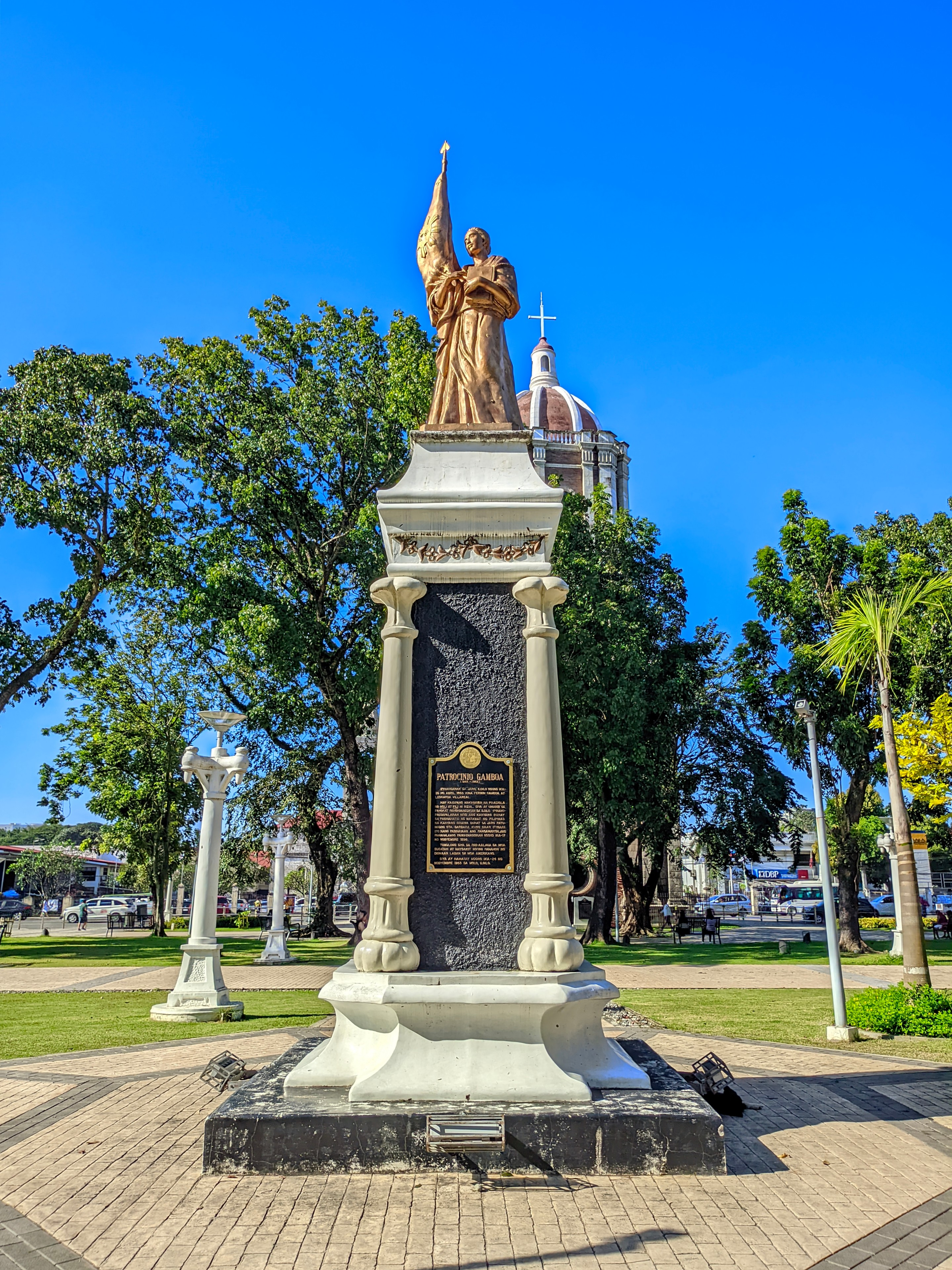
Patrocinio Gamboa Monument

== Graciano Lopez Jaena Park ==
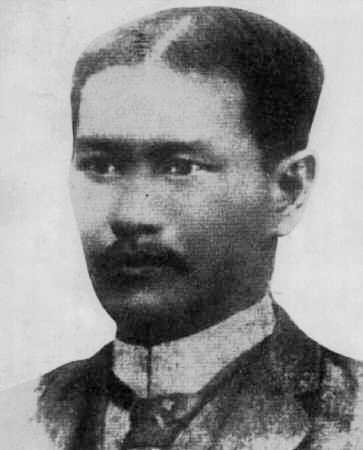
Graciano López Jaena

The renaming of Jaro Plaza to "Graciano Lopez Jaena Park" is a tribute to the notable Jaro-born journalist, reformist, and founder of La Solidaridad, Graciano Lopez Jaena. It also commemorates the friendship between Lopez Jaena and General Martin Delgado, who were both students at the nearby San Vicente de Ferrer Seminary and were known to frequent the plaza during their youth.

== Gallery ==
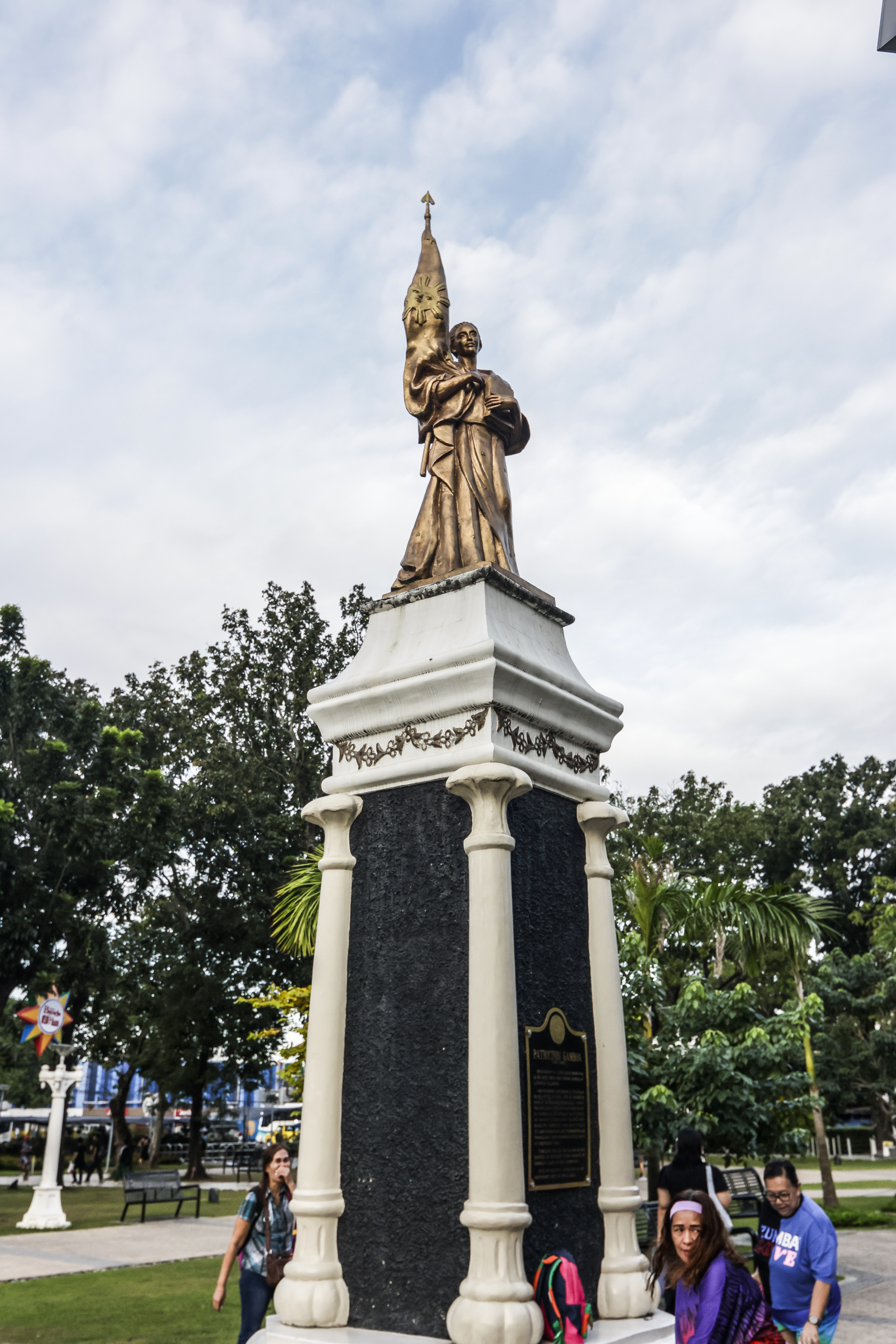

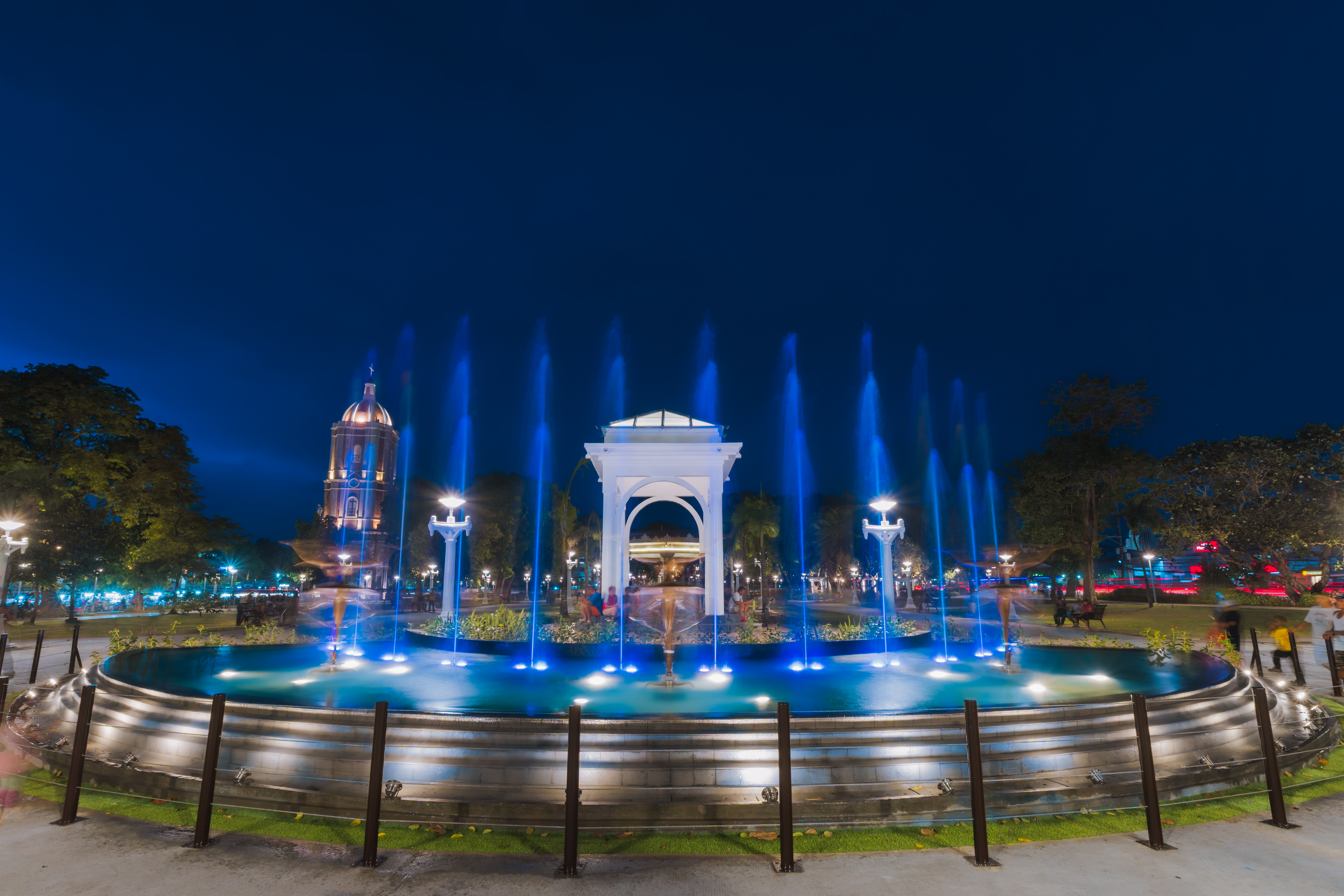

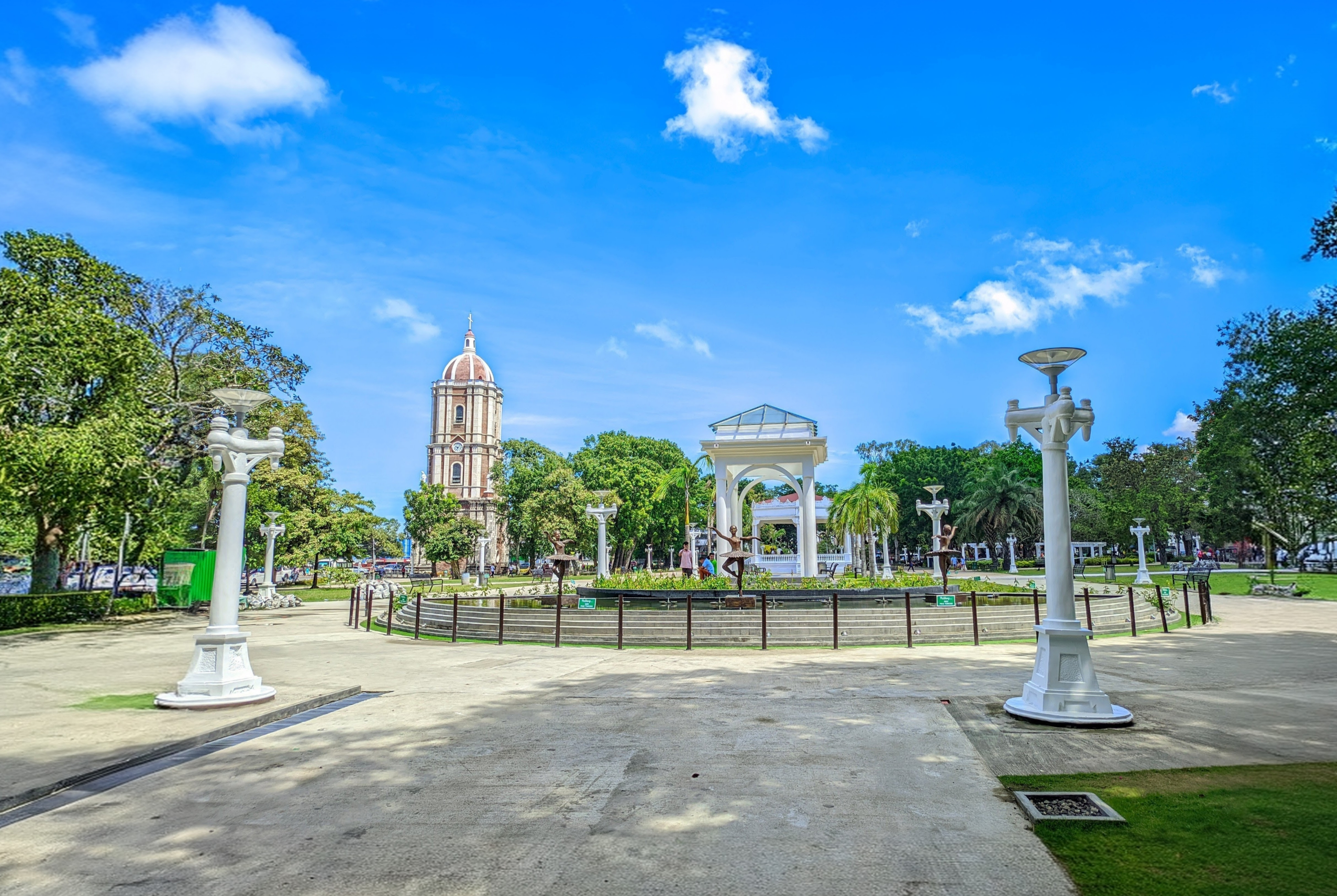

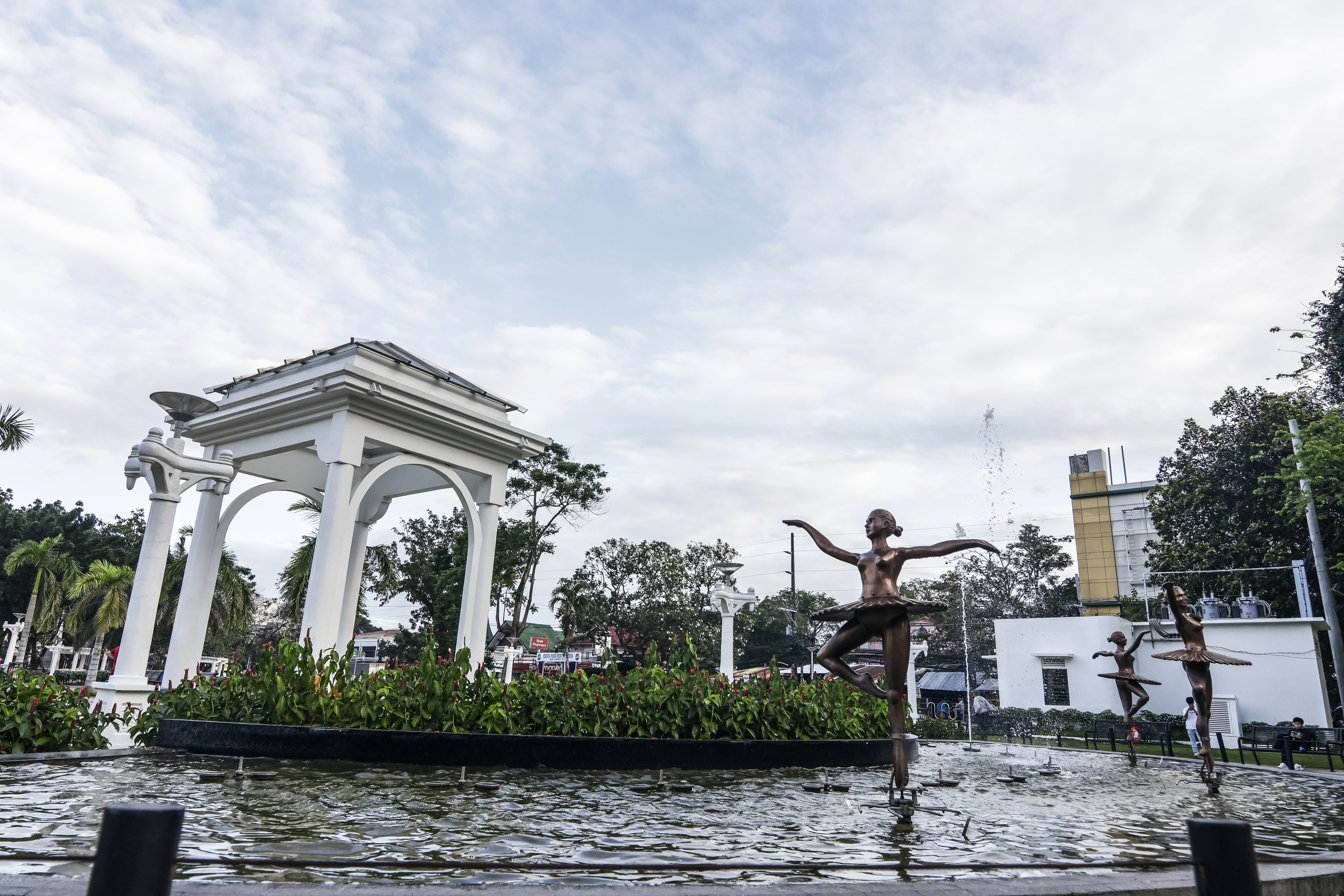

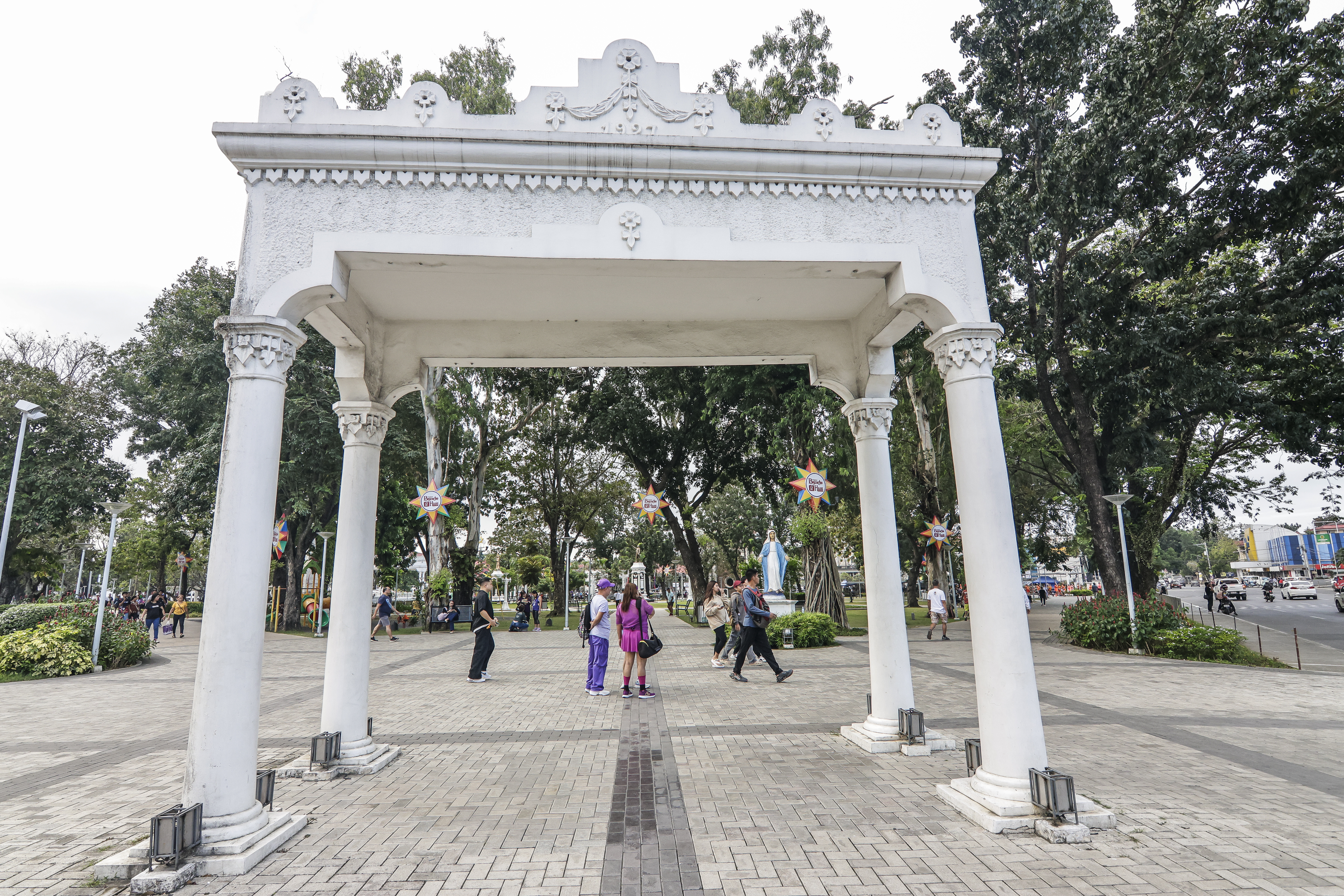

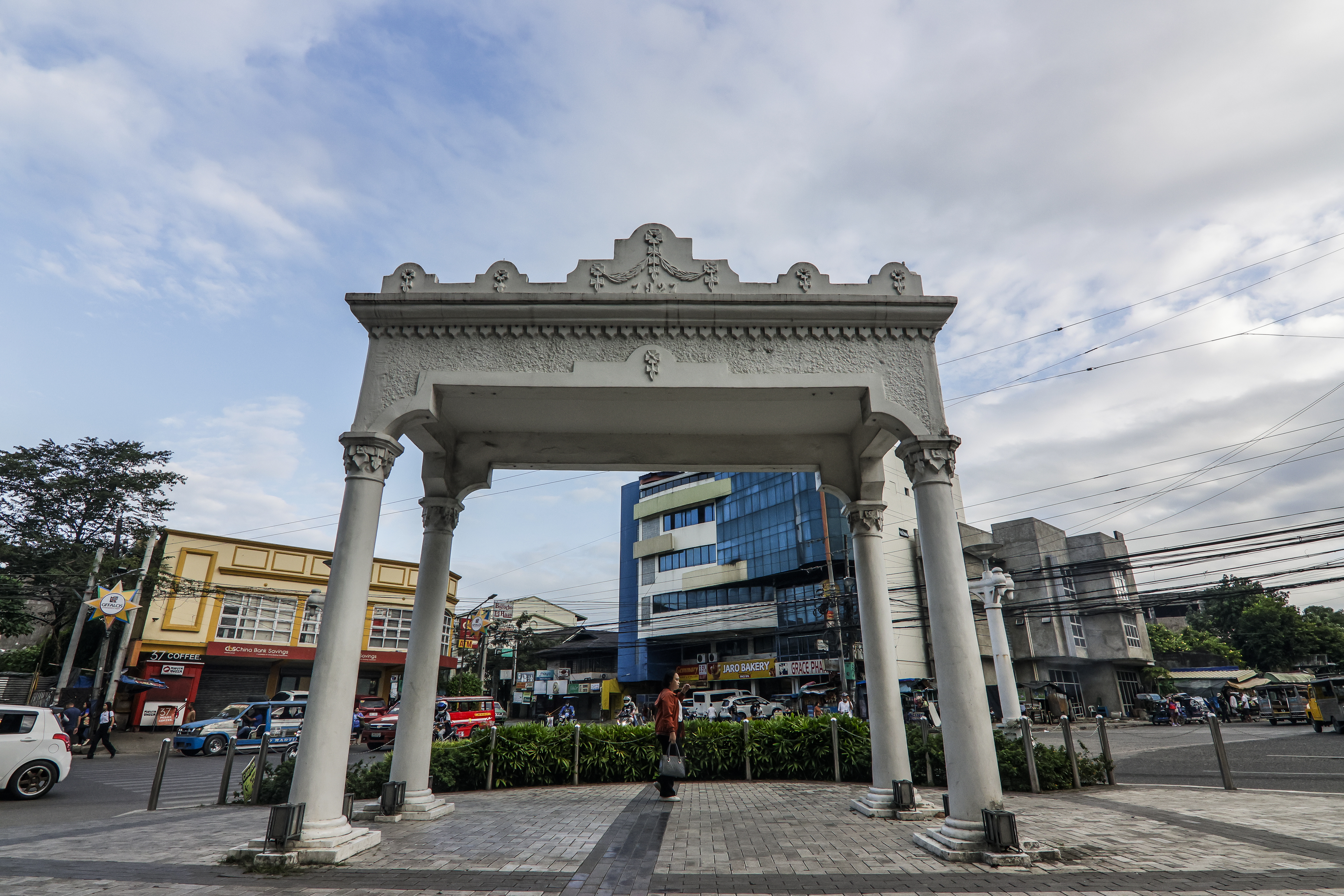

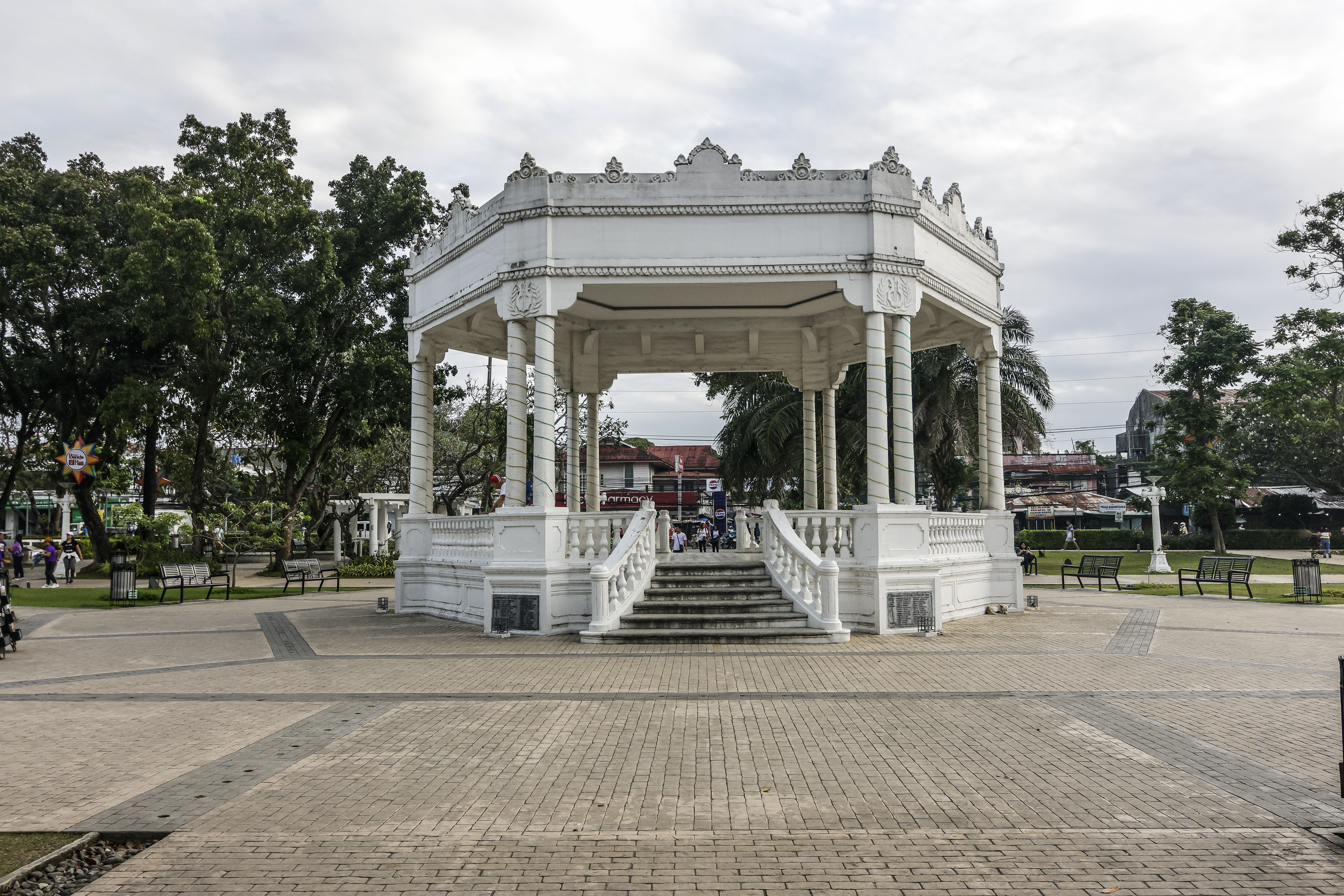
