= Jaro Belfry =

- Campanario de Jaro
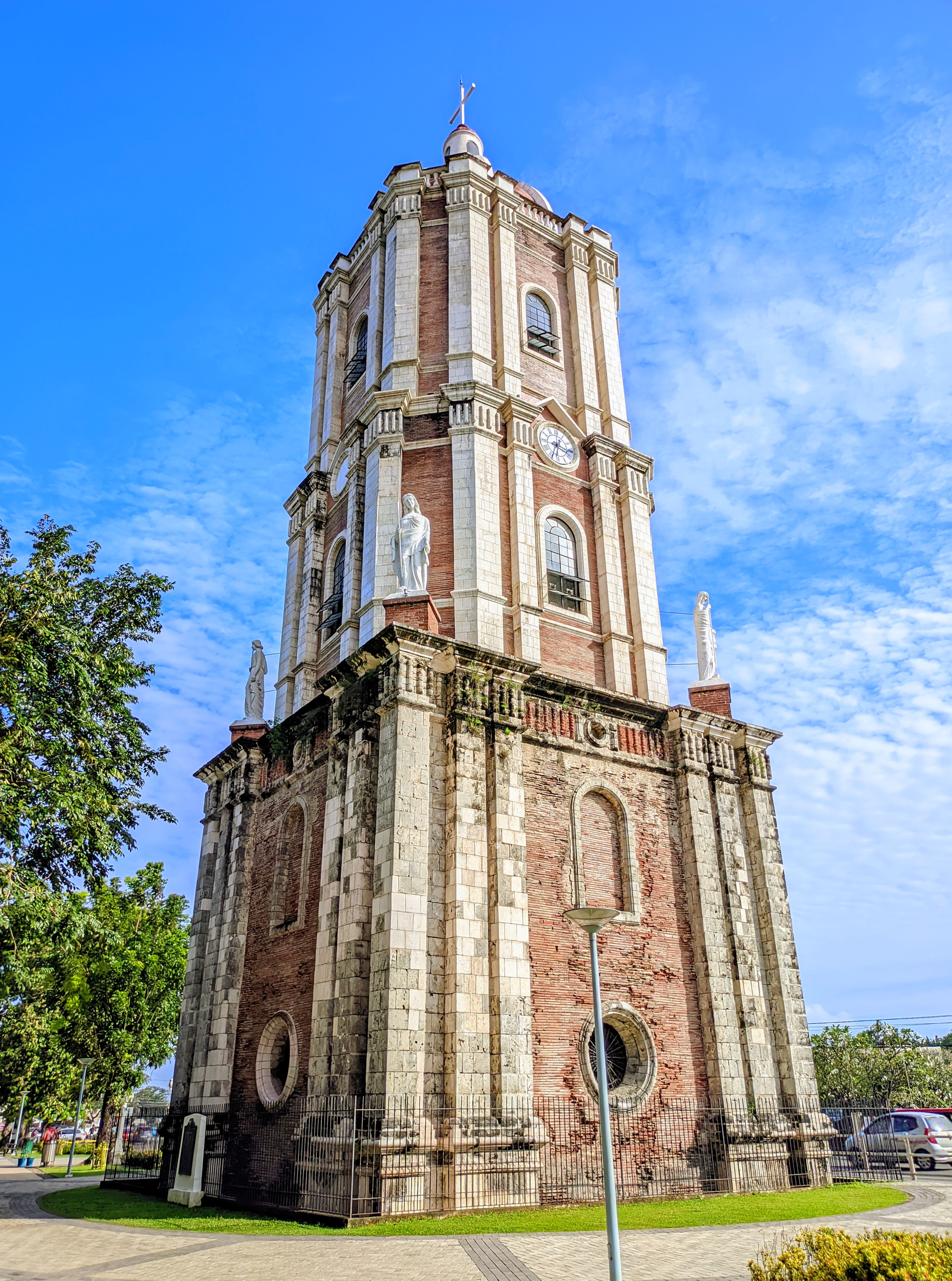
- The belfry in September 2025.

General information
- Type: Bell tower
- Architectural style: Baroque, neoclassical
- Location: Jaro, Iloilo City, Philippines
- Coordinates: 10°43′27″N 122°33′25″E
- Completed: 1744; 282 years ago
- Renovated: 2022; 4 years ago

Height
- Height: 29 metres (95 ft)

Technical details
- Floor count: 3

National Historical Landmarks
- Official name: Jaro Belfry
- Designated: May 29, 1984

Jaro Belfry, also known as Campanario de Jaro, is a Baroque and neoclassical free-standing bell tower located in front of the Jaro Metropolitan Cathedral in Jaro, Iloilo City, Philippines. It is the oldest bell tower in the Visayas and one of the few belfries in the country that stands separately from the church it is associated with.

== History ==
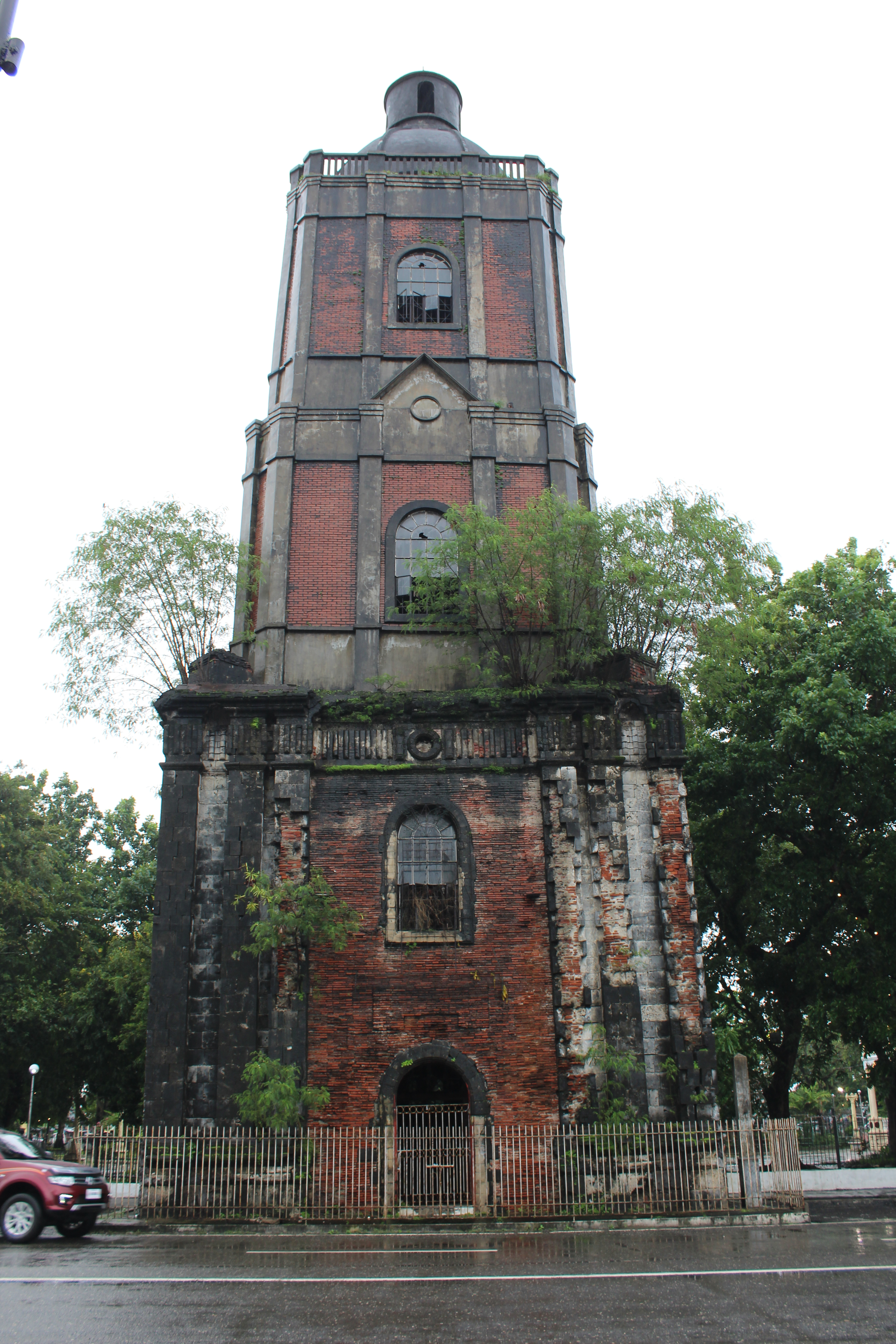
Jaro Belfry before the restoration, 2018.

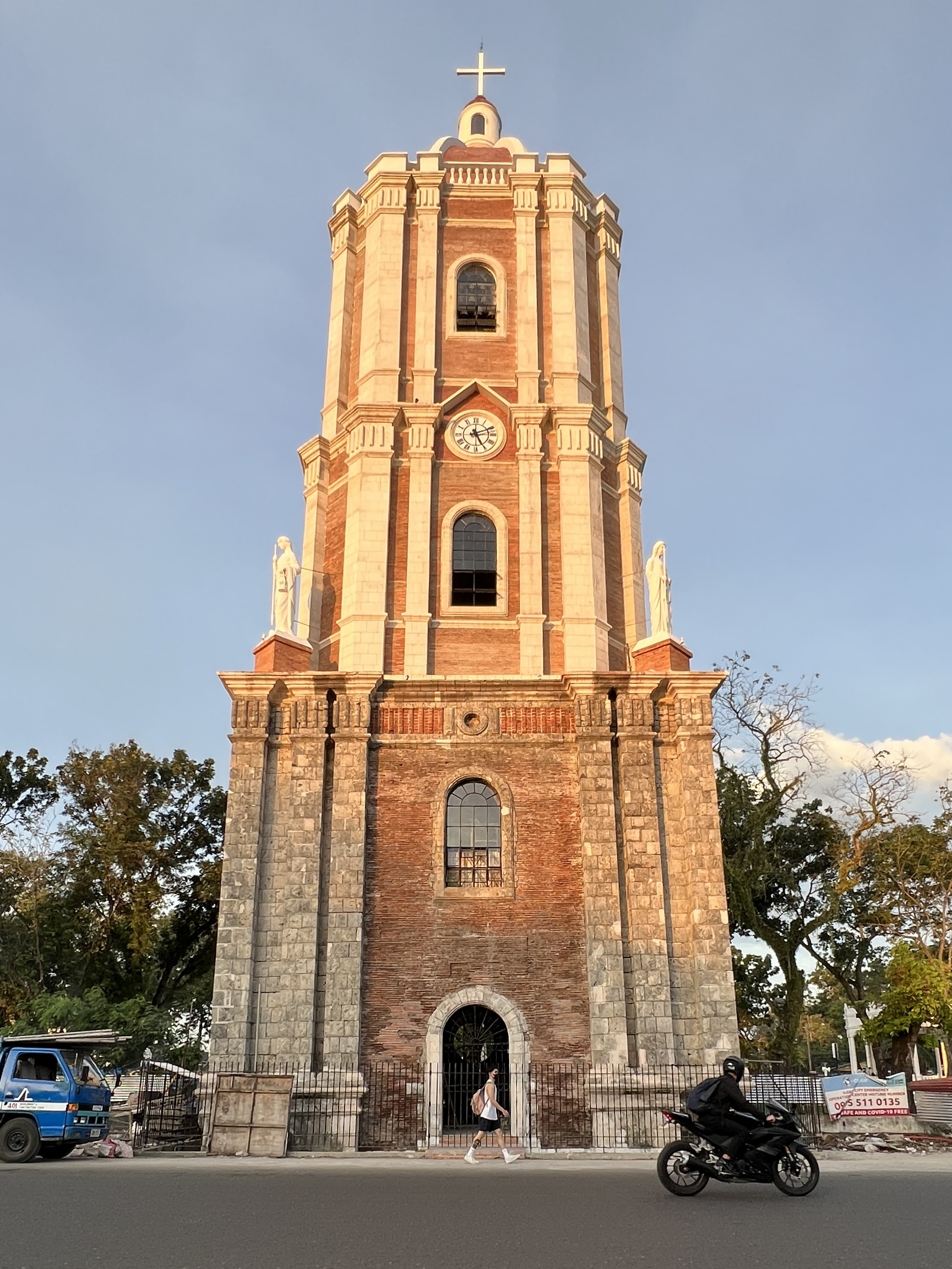
Jaro Belfry after the restoration, 2022.

Jaro Belfry was built in 1744 and made of bricks and limestone blocks. It served both as a religious structure and as a military watchtower against invaders, including the Moros, during the Spanish colonial period. On July 17, 1787, the belfry was heavily damaged by a strong earthquake. Reconstruction only began in 1833 under the supervision of an Augustinian friar, Fr. Jesse Alvarez. On June 29, 1868, another earthquake damaged the belfry. Msgr. Mariano Cuartero, the first bishop of Jaro, had this completely restored in 1881. On January 25, 1948, the belfry suffered again, in its third major destruction, when the earthquake named Lady Caycay swept through the entire Panay region. The second and third floors of the belfry collapsed, which left only the first floor as the original structure until these days.

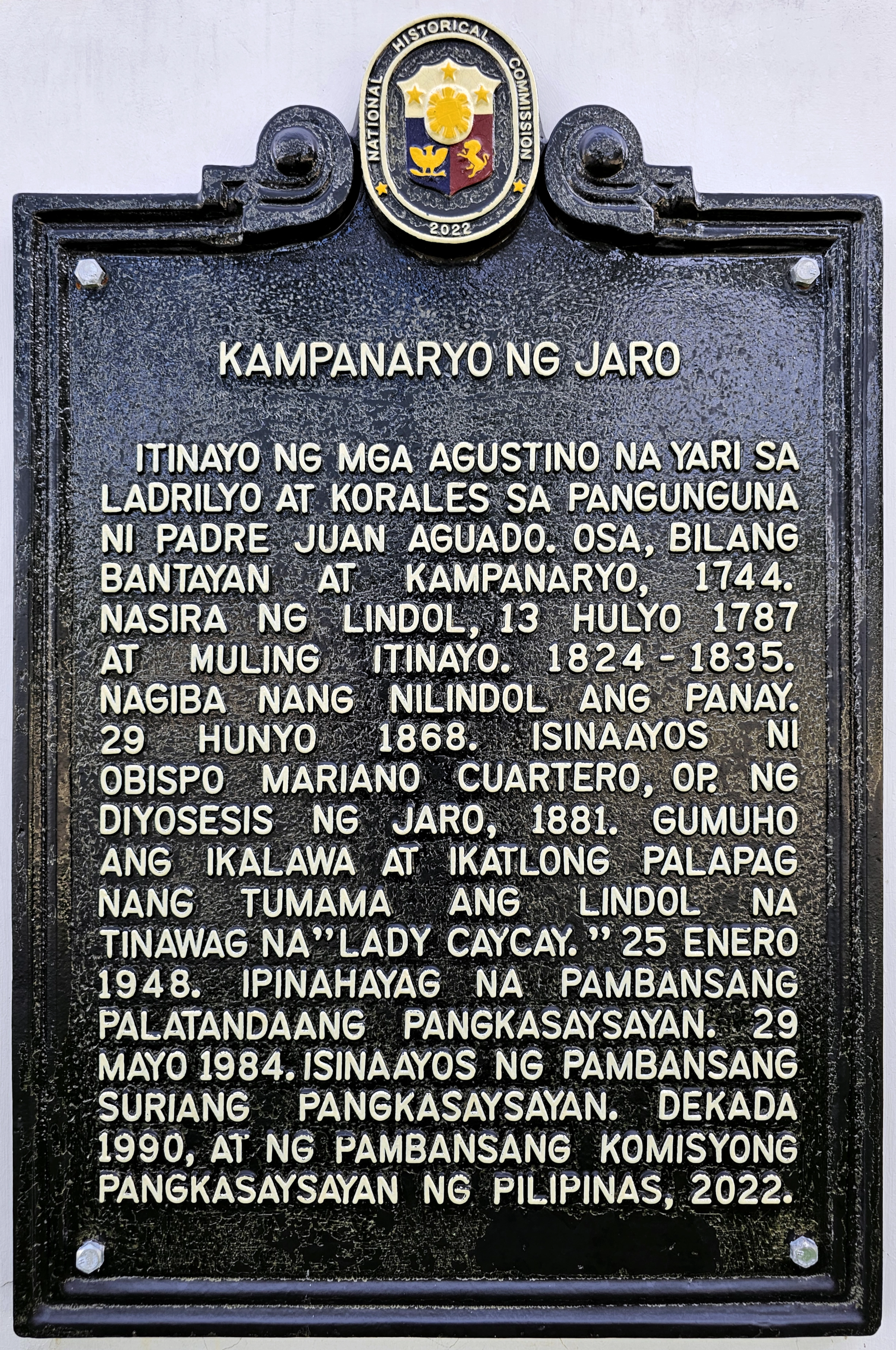
NHCP historical marker

On May 29, 1984, Jaro Belfry was declared a National Historical Landmark by the National Historical Institute (NHI), now known as the National Historical Commission of the Philippines (NHCP). Under the supervision of the agency, the reconstruction of the Jaro Belfry began in the 1990s. It was intended as a viewing deck and tourist center but was never made to work as planned due to a conflict with the Archdiocese of Jaro.

In February 2022, it was again under restoration under the same agency, NHCP. It includes the restoration of its original design with four cardinal virtue statues on the four corners of the structure, which had been missing for years. The turnover ceremony, including the unveiling of its historical marker, took place on November 27, 2022, when it also rang its bells again for the first time in 74 years.

== Architecture ==
The Jaro Belfry is a four-tier octagonal tower constructed from bricks and limestone blocks. The lower levels are made of limestone blocks, while the upper tiers are built with bricks. The tower features arched windows and niches, typical of the Baroque and neoclassical architectural style. At the top, the tower is capped with a conical roof and a cupola, originally designed to house the bells.

The belfry also features four clocks, one on each side of the tower, which were part of the original design but were damaged in the 1948 earthquake. During its restoration in 2022, the clocks were restored, and along with the four statues, which were also part of the original design, these were placed at each corner of the tower at the top of the podium, representing the four cardinal virtues: temperance, prudence, fortitude, and justice. The restoration preserved the tower's original materials and reinforced its structural stability.

== Gallery ==
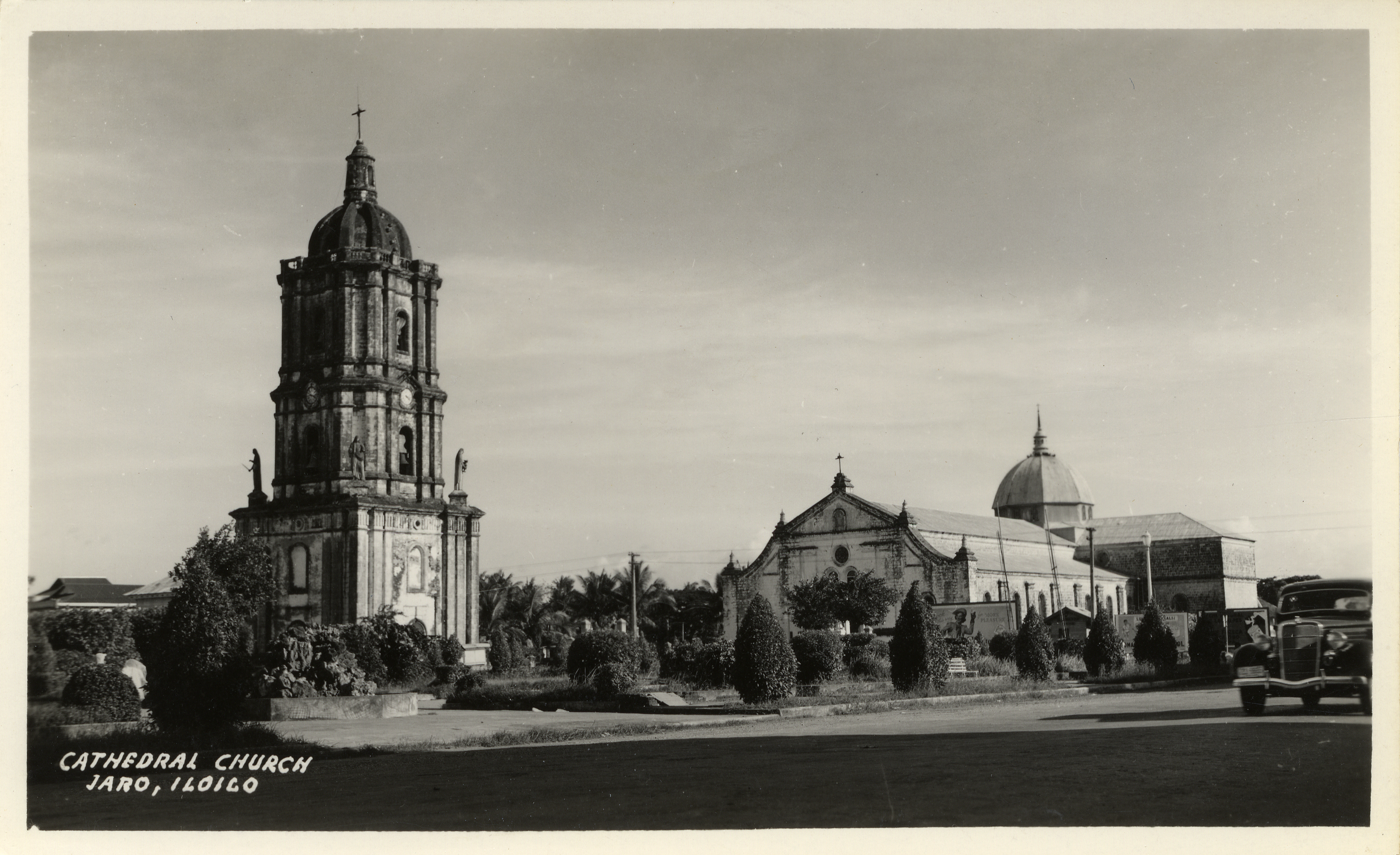
The belfry and cathedral in the 1920s

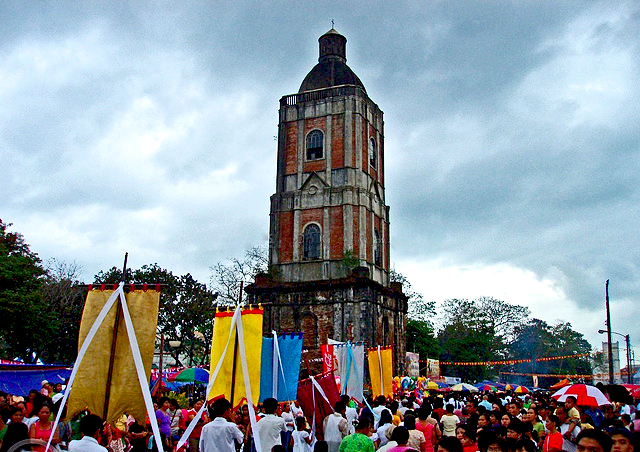
The belfry in 2008, during the Jaro Fiesta

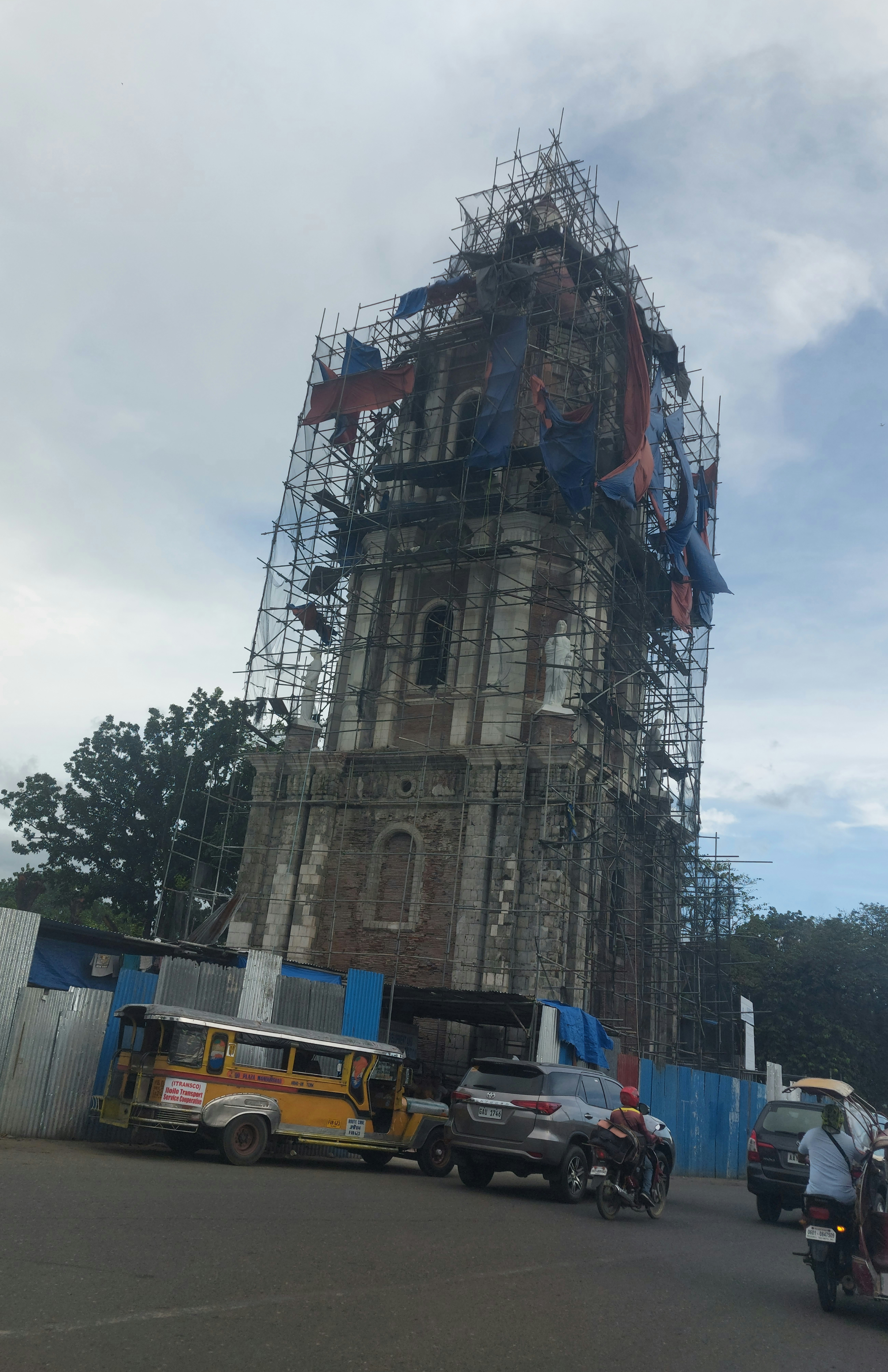
Under renovation in 2022

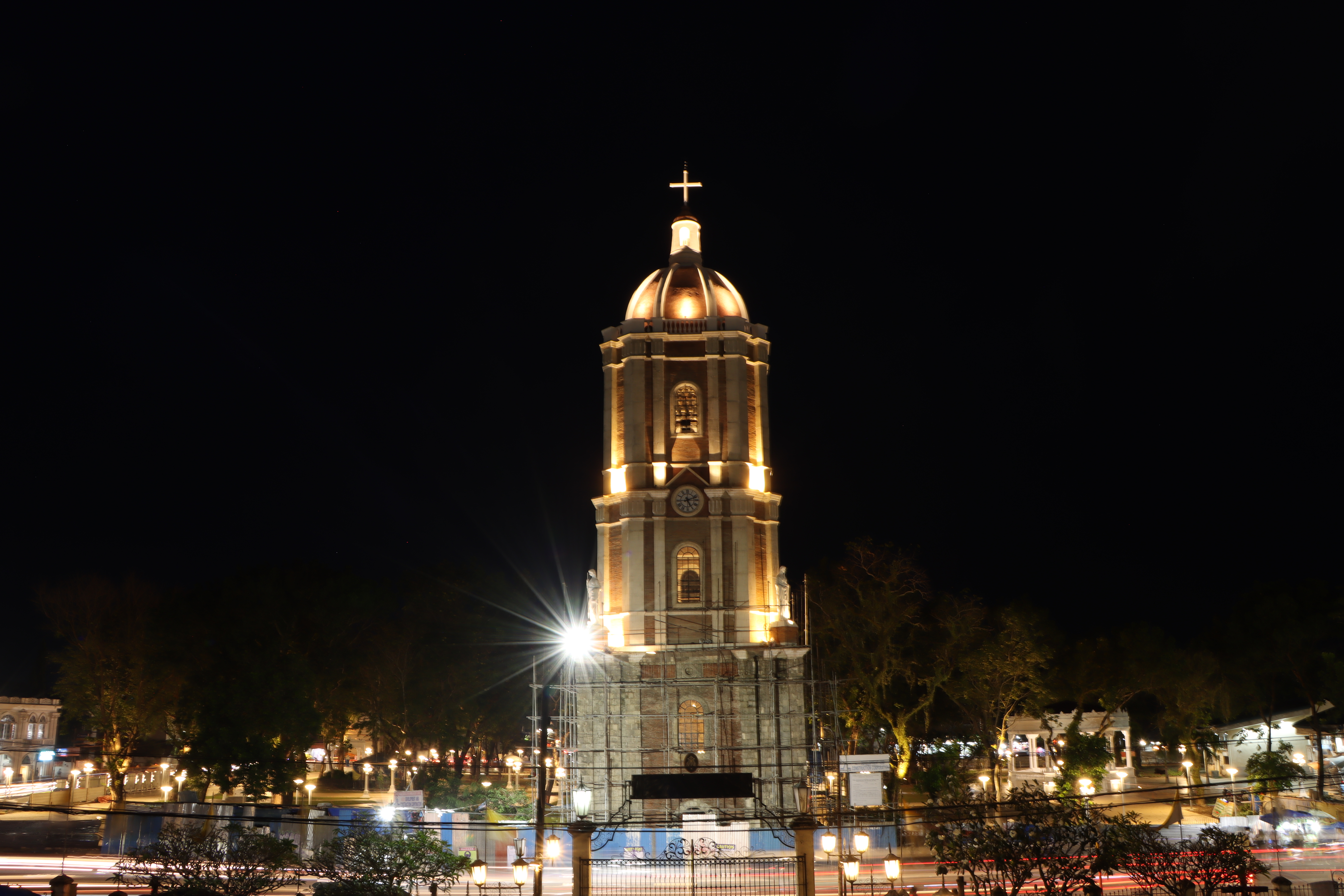
Lit up at night

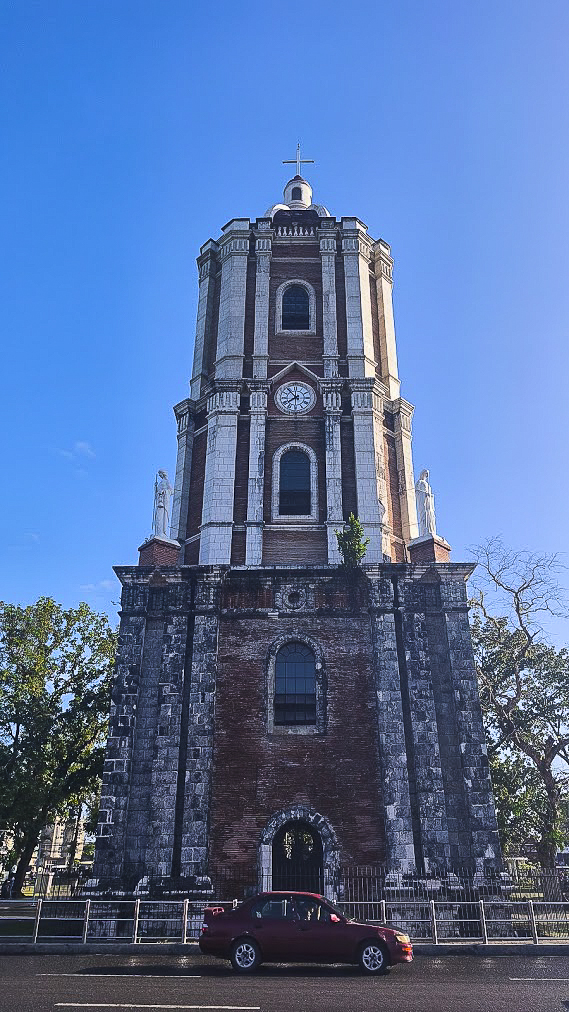

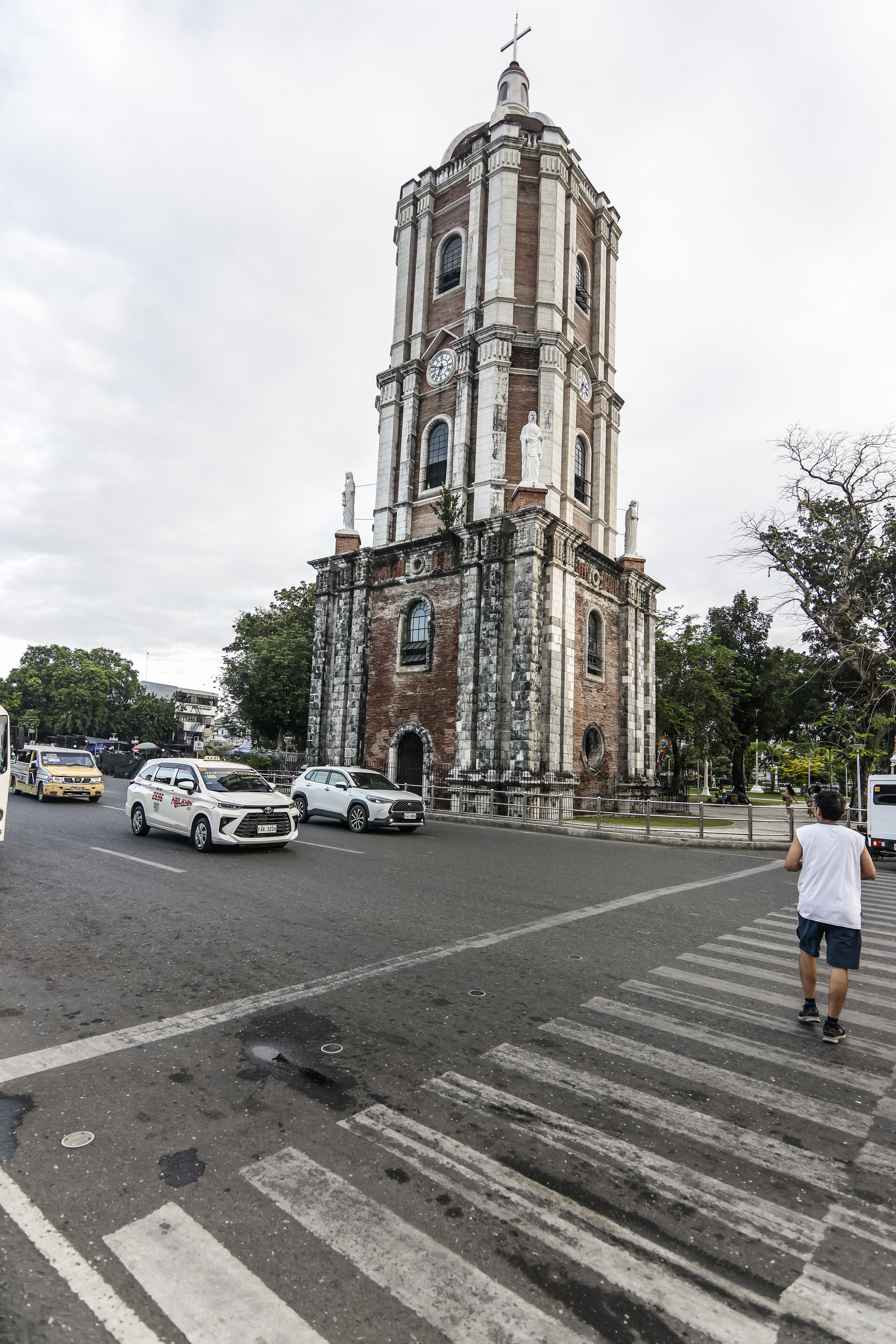

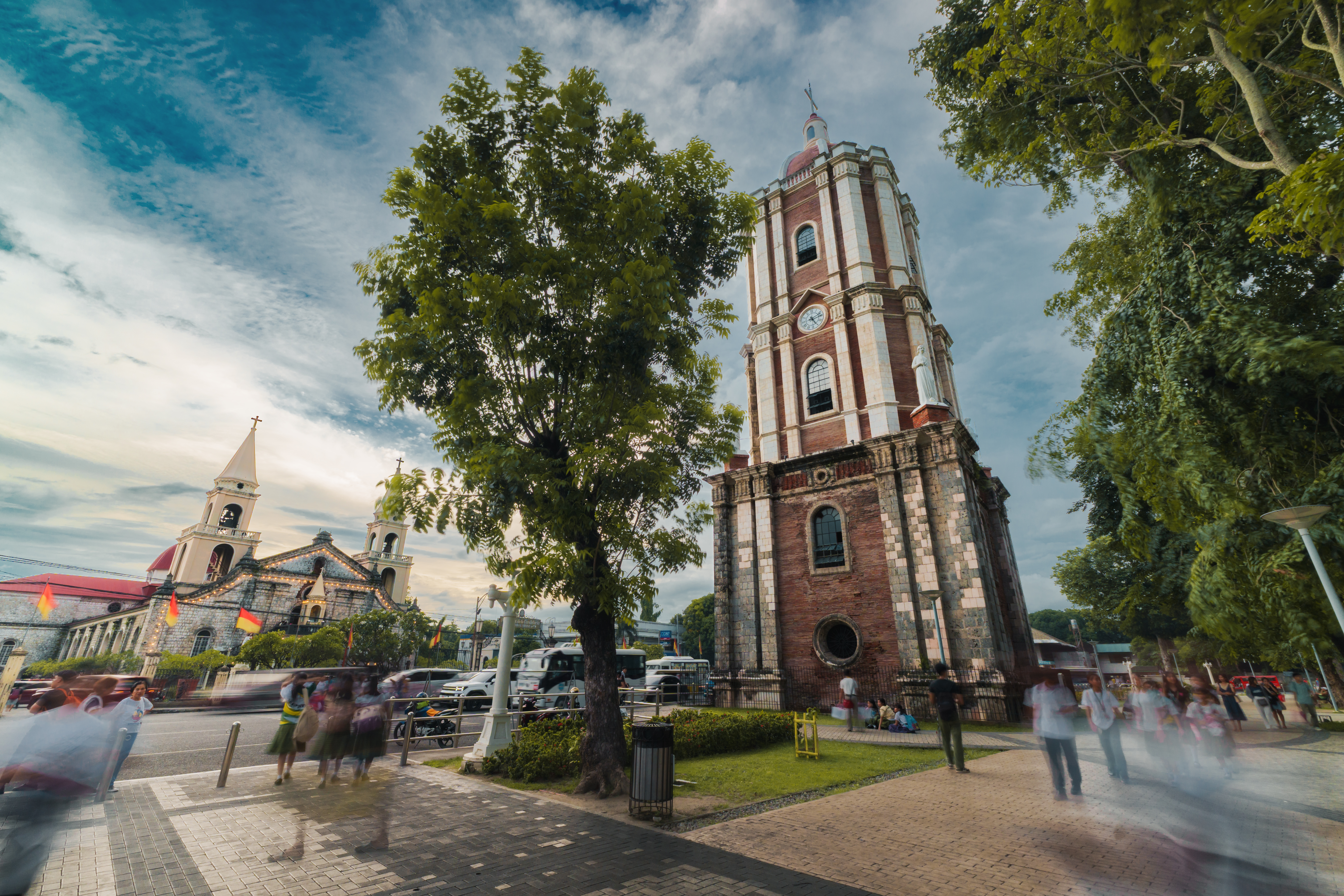
The belfry and Jaro Cathedral from Jaro Plaza

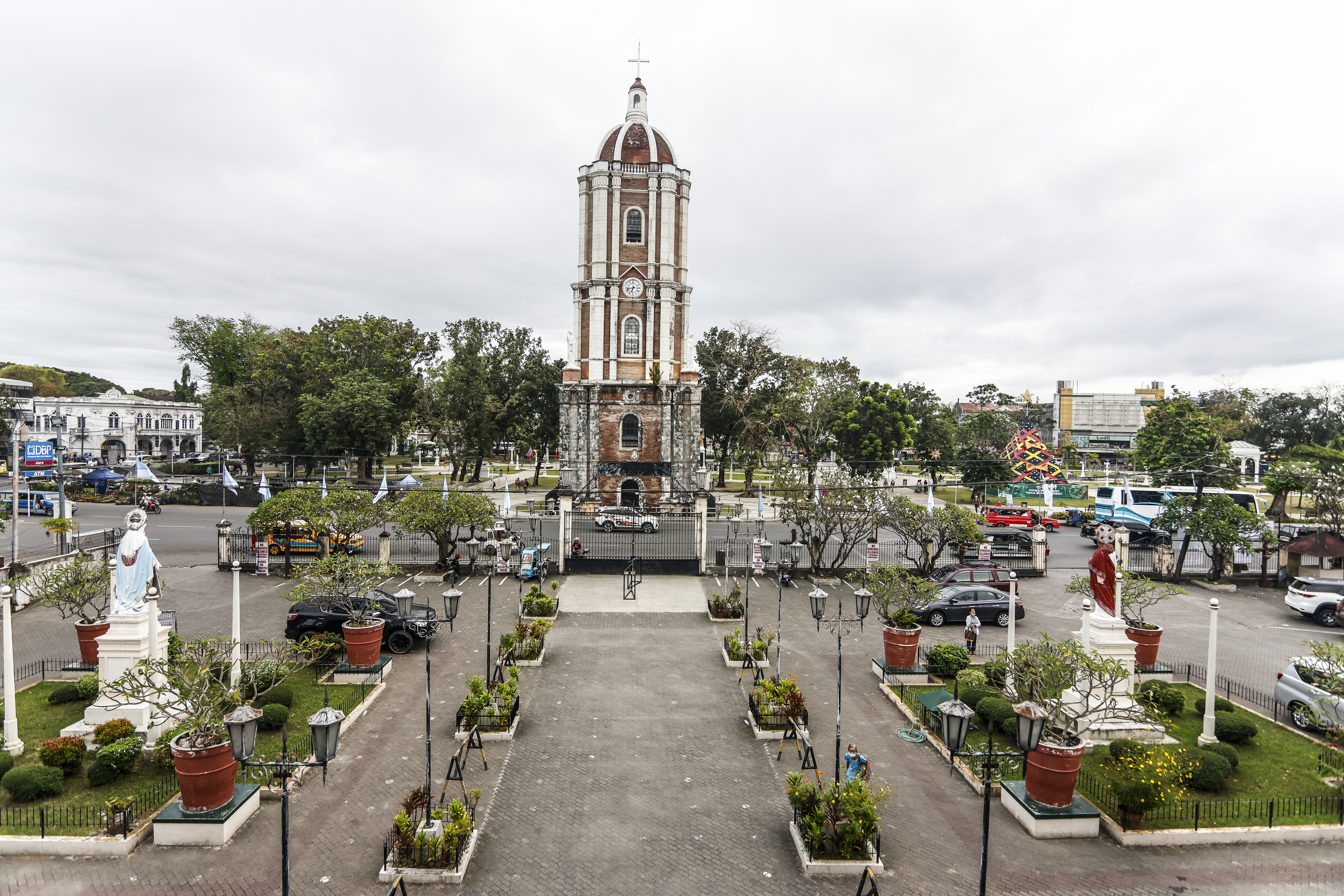
As seen from the Jaro Cathedral

== See also ==
- Jaro Cathedral
