= Gariépy =

- Pronunciation: French: [ɡaʁjepi]
- Language: French

Origin
- Region of origin: Gascony, France

Other names
- Variant forms: Garibay; Guerepy; Gardipee

Gariépy is a surname mostly found in North America. The most ancient known bearer of the name is Jean Gariépy who lived in Montfort-en-Chalosse, Gascony, France, from 1568 to 1609. His son, François Gariépy, came to Nouvelle-France where he married Marie Houdin in August 1657. Their children are the ancestors of the Gariépy of North America.

The surname Gariépy comes from the Basque surname Garibay. The Gariépy surname has many written forms like Guerepy, Garriépy, Gariépi, Guariépy, Gariépie, Garriépi, Garguépi, Garriépie, Guaryby, Kariépy and Gardipee. The name is usually written without accent (i.e. Gariepy) in the English-speaking parts of Canada and in the United States.

Gariépy may refer to:

- Annie Gariepy, Canadian Cyclist
- Charles Gariepy Canadian Alderman
- Henry Gariepy, writer
- Jean-François Gariépy, academic
- Joseph Gariépy (1852–1927), Canadian politician
- Ray Gariepy (1929-2012), Canadian ice hockey defenseman
- Wilfrid Gariépy (1877–1960), Canadian politician
- Yvon Gariepy Master of Royal Canadian Mint, 1975–1981

It may also refer to:

- Gariépy (Edmonton), West Edmonton, Alberta, Canada
