= Gamboa Airport =

Airport in Castro, Chiloé Island, Chile

- IATA: WCA; ICAO: SCST

Summary
- Airport type: Public
- Serves: Castro, Chile
- Elevation AMSL: 145 ft / 44 m
- Coordinates: 42°29′18″S 73°46′30″W

Map
- Location of airport in Chile

Runways
Direction	Length		Surface
Direction	m	ft	Surface
16/34	800	2,625	Grass
- Sources: SkyVector GCM Google Maps

Gamboa Airport (Spanish: Aeródromo Gamboa) (IATA: WCA, ICAO: SCST) is an airport serving Castro, a city on Chiloé Island in the Los Lagos Region of Chile.

The airport runs along the shoreline just south of Gamboa, and south approach and departures are over the water. Runway 34 has an additional 175 metres (574 ft) of unpaved overrun on the north end.

The Mocopulli VOR-DME (Ident: MPI) is located 9.3 nautical miles (17.2 km) north of the airport.

== See also ==
- Transport in Chile
- List of airports in Chile
