= Gambo =

Gambo may refer to:

== Places ==
- Gambo, Central African Republic, a town in the Central African Republic
- Gambo, Newfoundland and Labrador, a town in northeastern Newfoundland, Newfoundland and Labrador, Canada

== Ships ==
- USS West Gambo (ID-3220), a United States Navy cargo ship commission from 1918 to 1919

== Other uses ==
- Gambo (rapper), a Ghanaian rapper
- Gambo (cryptid), a globster discovered in 1983 on Bungalow Beach, The Gambia.
