= Patrocinio Gamboa =

Filipina revolutionary

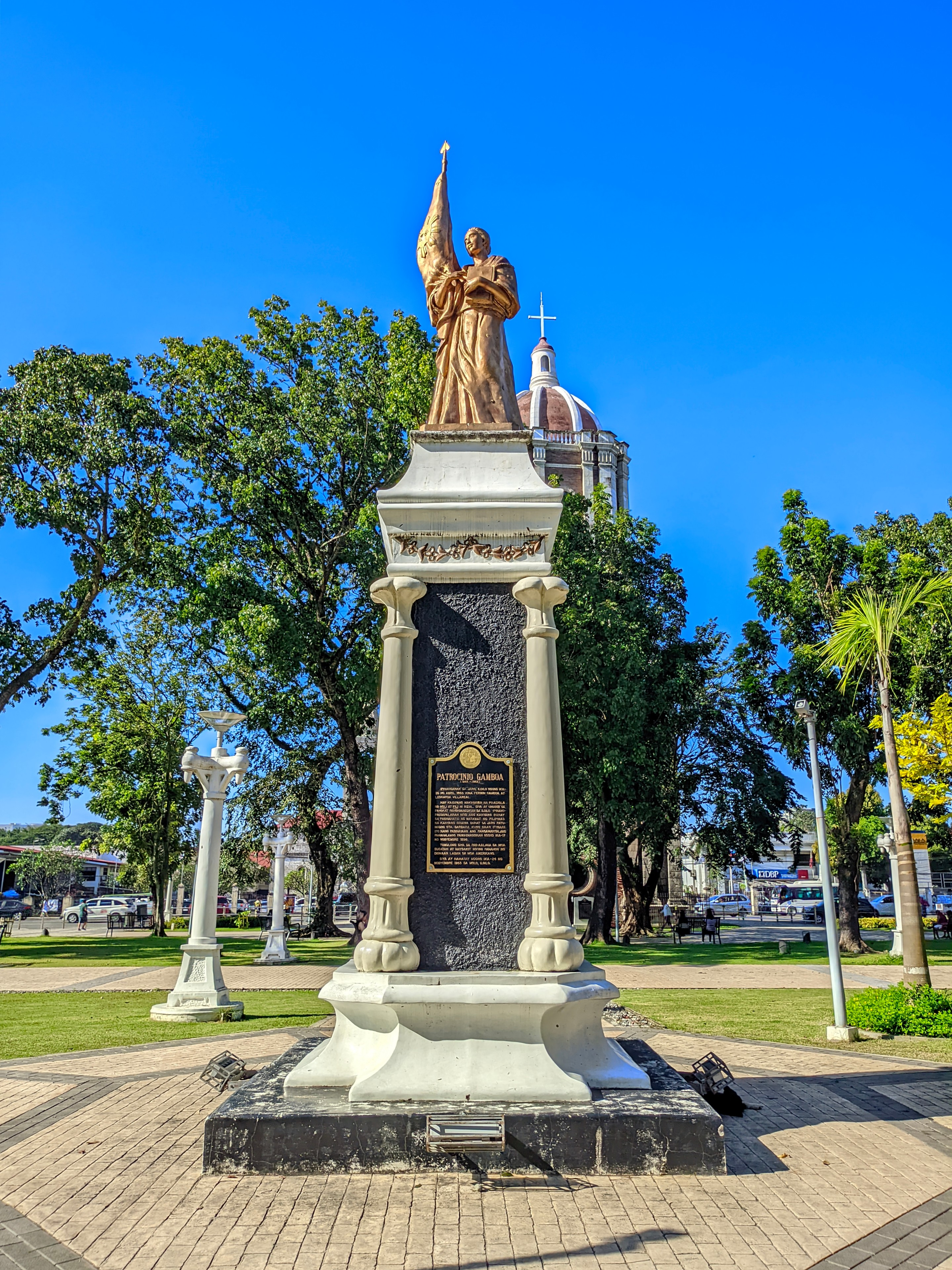
- Statue of Patrocinio Gamboa in Plaza Jaro in Iloilo City
- Born: Patrocinio Gamboa y Villareal; April 30, 1865; Jaro, Iloilo City, Captaincy General of the Philippines
- Died: November 24, 1953 (aged 88); Molo, Iloilo City, Philippines
- Resting place: Balantang Veterans' Cemetery, Jaro, Iloilo City, Philippines
- Other name: Tia Patron
- Known for: patriotic endeavors during the Philippine Revolution
- Parent(s): Fermín Gamboa; Leonarda Villareal

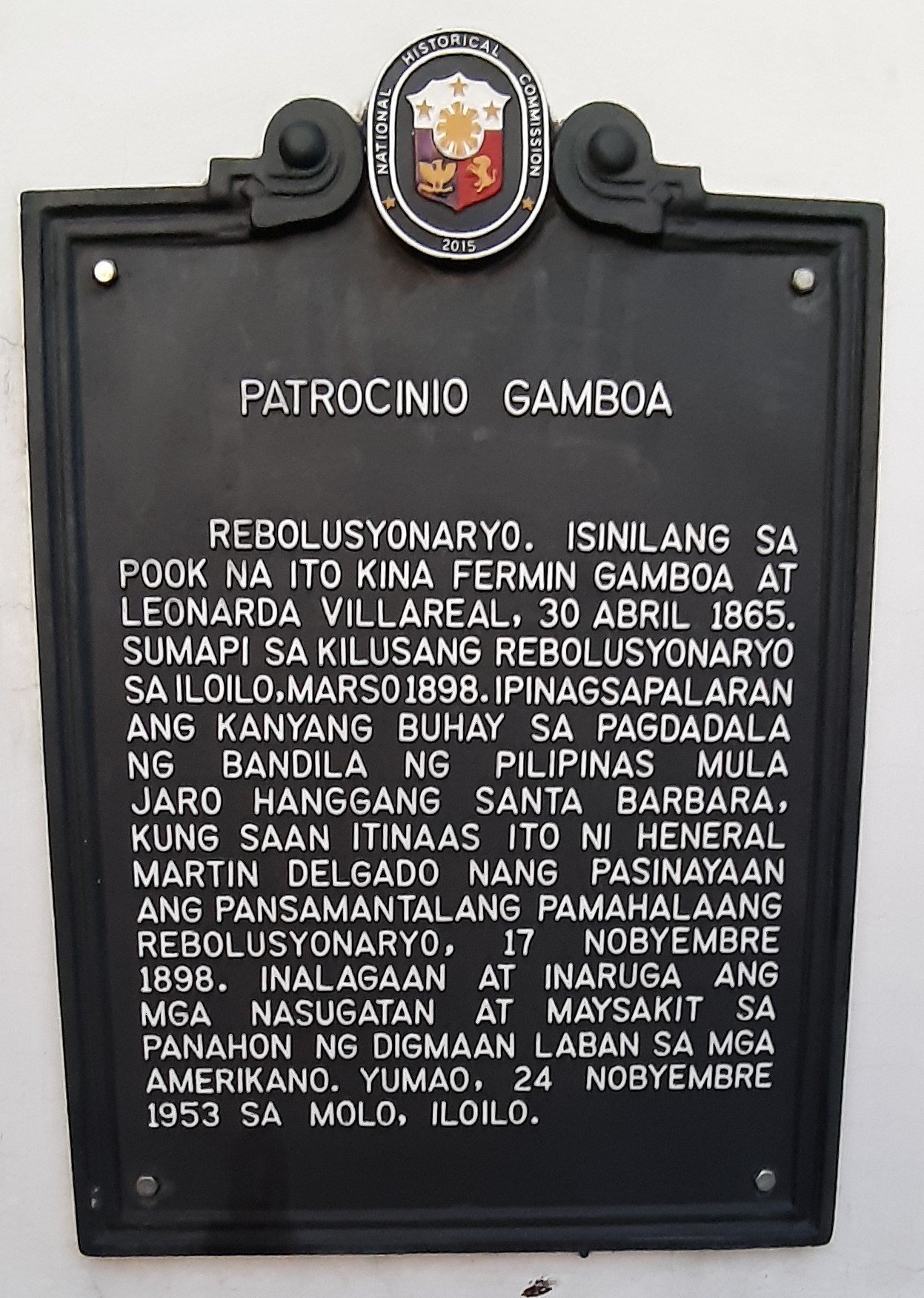

Patrocinio Gamboa y Villareal (30 April 1865 – 24 November 1953) was a Filipino revolutionary notable for her participation in the Philippine Revolution. Gamboa is best known for making the Philippine flag hoisted during the inauguration of the revolutionary government of the Visayas in Santa Barbara, Iloilo.

== Early life ==
Patrocinio Gamboa was born on 30 April 1865 in Jaro, Iloilo, Philippines to Fermín Gamboa and Leonila Villareal. She was baptized on 7 May 1865 at Jaro Church by Francisco Agüería, and her godmother was Severina Gamboa. Her wealthy parents provided private tutors for her education. Gamboa was an avid reader of Spanish classics and newspapers. She was also deeply influenced by the literary works of the Propaganda Movement. Being the daughter of a wealthy and prominent family, she was well known in the community. She was devoutly religious, independent-minded, and brave of heart.

== Philippine Revolution against Spain ==
Among the first to join the revolution, Tia Patron was one of the organizers of the Comite Central Revolucionario de Visayas ("Central Revolutionary Committee of the Visayas"), which formed the nucleus of what later became the Revolutionary Government of the Visayas. She nursed wounded and sick soldiers in the battlefield. She also collected war contributions from the Chinese in Iloilo and gathered food and medical supplies, arms, and ammunition for the revolutionary forces. For this, she was considered as the “Heroine of Jaro.”

History mixes her story of heroism with comedy. On 17 November 1898, the revolutionary government of the Visayas was to be inaugurated. Such an occasion called for a flag. The women of Jaro prepared a replica of the flag made by Marcela Agoncillo for General Emilio Aguinaldo in Hong Kong. The problem lay in its delivery to the Santa Barbara headquarters of General Martin Delgado. Between the two towns were Spanish guards shooting anyone suspected as being in league with the revolutionary forces. They thoroughly inspected civilians passing along the roads. Gamboa and a young lieutenant, Honorio Solinap, volunteered for the task. Gamboa wrapped the revolutionary flag around her waist, concealing it within her garments. The two went off as a husband and wife delivering hay in a carriage. A saber, a gift of General Aguinaldo to General Delgado, lay concealed under the hay. The carriage came upon a roadblock and the two faced danger. To divert the attention of the guards, Gamboa staged a husband and wife quarrel with herself as a domineering wife, berating an unfortunate, weak husband. As she shouted and cursed the subdued man, she also pinched, bit and boxed him. They acted their parts so convincingly that the guards, overwhelmed with laughter, allowed them pass. They delivered the flag in time for the inaugural ceremonies.

== Later life and death ==
Offered a lifetime pension by the colonial government, Gamboa declined, saying, “I give my services because I love my country. I do not ask any compensation for these services.” She died 24 November 1953 and was buried at the Balantang Veterans' Cemetery in Jaro. In her honor, a marker was installed in Jaro, Iloilo on 21 December 1980.
