= Jonathan Garibay =

American football player (born 1999)

Profile
- Position: Kicker

Personal information
- Born: August 16, 1999 (age 27); Rubidoux, California, U.S.
- Listed height: 5 ft 11 in (1.80 m)
- Listed weight: 221 lb (100 kg)

Career information
- High school: Rubidoux (Jurupa Valley, California)
- College: Riverside (2017–2018); Texas Tech (2019–2021)
- NFL draft: 2022: undrafted

Career history
- Dallas Cowboys (2022)*; Hamilton Tiger-Cats (2023)*; Arlington Renegades (2024); Birmingham Stallions (2026)
- * Offseason or practice squad member only

Awards and highlights
- First-team All-SCFA (2017, 2018); First-team All-Big 12 (2021)

Career UFL statistics as of Week 3, 2026
- Field goals made: 15
- Field goal attempts: 17
- Field goal %: 88.2
- Points scored: 50
- Longest field goal: 48
- Touchbacks: 1

Jonathan Garibay (born August 16, 1999) is an American football kicker. He played college football for the Texas Tech Red Raiders before signing with the Dallas Cowboys as an undrafted free agent in 2022.

== Early life ==
Garibay was born on August 16, 1999, and attended Rubidoux High School in Jurupa Valley, California, where he played soccer, and football, where he served as a tight end, strong safety, and as their placekicker.

== College career ==
Garibay attended Riverside City College in 2017 and 2018 then Texas Tech University from 2019 to 2021.

=== Riverside City College ===
In 2017, for his freshman season, Garibay made 6 of 8 field goal attempts, 60 of 72 extra points, with a long of 46 yards. He also handled punting duties, averaging 39.3 yards per punt on 48 attempts, 11 of which were downed inside the 20.

In 2018, for his sophomore season, Garibay made 9 of 12 field goal attempts, 46 of 50 extra points, with a long of 47 yards. He also handled punting duties, averaging 40.1 yards per attempt, downing 26 of 51 punts inside the 20, which helped lead Riverside to an 11-1 record.

During his time at Riverside, Garibay was responsible for field goals, kickoffs and punting duties. In his two seasons he made 15 of 20 field goal attempts, 106 of 112 extra points, with a long of 47 yards, which earned him the All-SCFA first team each of his two seasons at the college.

=== Texas Tech ===
In 2019, Garibay did not see the field for Texas Tech, rather serving as a member of their travel squad.

In 2020, for his junior season, Garibay made 8 of 11 field goal attempts (72.7%), and 6 of 7 on extra point attempts (85.7%). In his first game played for Texas Tech, he made all four field goals and kicked the game winning 25 yard field goal over Baylor.

In 2021, for his senior season, Garibay made 15 of 16 field goal attempts (93.8%), and 49 of 50 on extra point attempts (98%). Garibay also hit a 62-yard game winning field goal vs Iowa State, the second longest in Big 12 history, only behind Martin Gramatica.

Garibay finished his Texas Tech career making 23 of his 27 field goal attempts (85.2%), and went 55 of 57 on extra point attempts (96.5%) which combined for 124 points. He holds team records for the longest field goal (62 yards), and tied the record for making the first 13 field goals of the season.

== Professional career ==
=== Dallas Cowboys ===
After going undrafted in the 2022 NFL draft, Garibay signed with the Dallas Cowboys on May 3, 2022, to compete with Chris Naggar. After inconsistent performance in practice, he was released on August 9, as the Cowboys signed Brett Maher.

=== Hamilton Tiger-Cats ===
Garibay signed with the Hamilton Tiger-Cats on May 22, 2023. He was released on June 3.

=== Arlington Renegades ===
Garibay signed with the Arlington Renegades on April 19, 2024, after Taylor Russolino was injured. In the seven games he played for the Renegades, he made 13 of 14 field goals (93.8%), with a long of 48 yards. Garibay did not resign with the Renegades after the season.

=== Birmingham Stallions ===
Garibay signed with the Birmingham Stallions on January 14, 2026. He won the starting job on February 10, after Rodrigo Blankenship was removed from the Stallions roster. In his first game with the Stallions, Garibay had a 50 yard field goal blocked and missed two extra points, despite this however, the Stallions won 15–13. On April 14, after missing four of his 11 kicks, Garibay was released in favor of Anders Carlson.

== Career statistics ==
=== UFL ===
Legend
**Bold**	Career high

General			Field goals					PATs			Kickoffs			Points
Season	Team	GP	FGM	FGA	FG%	Blck	Long	XPM	XPA	XP%	KO	Avg	TBs	Pts
2024	ARL	7	**13**	**14**	**93.8**	**1**	**48**	–	–	–	**38**	**68.5**	**1**	**39**
2026	BHM	3	2	3	66.7	**1**	34	**5**	**8**	**62.5**	14	58.3	0	11
Career		10	15	17	88.2	2	48	5	8	62.5	52	65.7	1	50

=== College ===
Legend
**Bold**	Career high

Year	Team	Kicking							
Year	Team	FGM	FGA	FG%	Long	XPM	XPA	XP%	PTS
2020	Texas Tech	8	11	72.7%	48	6	7	85.7%	30
2021	Texas Tech	**15**	**16**	**93.8%**	**62**	**49**	**50**	**98%**	**94**
Career		23	27	85.2%	62	55	57	96.5%	124
