= Gambone =

Gambone is a surname. Notable people with the surname include:

- Joseph C. Gambone, American surgeon
- Philip Gambone (born 1948), American writer
- Ralph M. Gambone, U.S. Navy band leader
- Victor Gambone, Terri Schiavo's primary care physician

== See also ==
- Michael Gambon (1940–2023), Irish-English actor
