= Timeline of the Hello Garci scandal =

The following is a timeline of the Hello Garci scandal.

== June 2005 ==
- June 6 - In a press conference, Press Secretary Ignacio Bunye plays two recordings of telephone conversations supposedly between President Gloria Macapagal Arroyo and Election Commissioner Virgilio Garcillano.
- June 9 - Arroyo denies cheating in the 2004 elections.
- June 27 - Arroyo addresses the country in a television broadcast, admitting speaking to an election official, but denying manipulating election results.

== July 2005 ==
- July 8 - Ten Cabinet members (later called the "Hyatt 10"), file their irrevocable resignations and request Arroyo to resign as well.

== August 2007 ==
=== Tuesday, August 21 ===
On August 21, 2007, Intelligence Service Armed Forces of the Philippines (ISAFP) agent in Garci tapes resurfaces and Panfilo Lacson wants investigation by the Committee on National Defense and Security. During a privilege speech, Lacson played a taped interview of Air Force T/Sgt. Vidal Doble. Jr, formerly of the Intelligence Service of the Armed Forces of the Philippines (ISAFP). Vidal stated that Project Lighthouse (September 2003 to April 2005), targeted several personalities. He came out since he is already a civilian and he did not see any action against cheating in the 2004 and 2007 elections.

=== Wednesday, August 22 ===
An insider of Smart Communications worked with the ISAFP in wiretapping political leaders during the 2004 elections, and Smart admitted it was possible that an employee coordinated with ISAFP. Vidal Doble said 2 of his former superiors at the "Project Lighthouse" operation – Col. Paul Sumayo and Capt. Frederick Rebong – "coordinated" with a "recruit" and contact inside Smart. Ramon Isberto of Smart, said - "This first came out two to three years ago. The company has not participated in any efforts to monitor conversations." Speechless wiretappers: Doble said he and everybody else involved in "Project Lighthouse" were shocked to hear President Gloria Macapagal Arroyo speak with former Virgilio Garcillano about the rigging of poll results. Doble said "Project Lighthouse" had 14 members divided into 4 teams - "All of the teams knew about the conversation of PGMA (Arroyo) and commissioner Garcillano." Doble revealed those who gave the order to launch "Project Lighthouse": Western Command (Wescom) chief Vice Admiral Tirso Danga, former deputy chief of staff for intelligence; Brigadier Gen. Marlou Quevedo, former ISAFP chief; Army Col. Allen Capuyan, former head of the ISAFP's special operations group; and "down the line" the project "group commander" Col. Sumayo; Capt. Rebong; and Capt. Lindsay Rex Sagge.

La Union 2nd district Rep. Thomas Dumpit Jr., a former intelligence officer of the Presidential Security Group and Philippine Army officer, stated that he discovered the ISAFP's illegal wiretapping activities during the time of former general Jose Calimlim, where it tapped conversations coming in and out of Joseph Estrada's. ISAFP agents had also been involved in the selling of intelligence information to foreign agencies, including the US Central Intelligence Agency. The Senate of the Philippines agreed to revive the investigation on the "Hello, Garci" wiretap recordings after Doble revealed his readiness to testify.

=== Thursday, September 6 ===
On September 6, 2007, retired Philippine Court of Appeals Justices Santiago Ranada and Oswaldo Agcaoili filed (a 15-page petition for prohibition with temporary restraining order or preliminary injunction) with the Supreme Court of the Philippines to enjoin the September 7, 2007 Senate of the Philippines (committee on national defense) wiretap probe (on the alleged wiretapping of telephone conversations of President Gloria Macapagal Arroyo and former election commissioner Virgilio Garcillano inter alia).
