= Fraud (book) =

2006 Filipino book about the Hello Garci scandal

Fraud: Gloria Macapagal-Arroyo and the May 2004 Elections
- Editor: Bobby M. Tuazon
- Language: English
- Subject: Gloria Macapagal Arroyo; Hello Garci scandal
- Genre: Non-fiction
- Publisher: Center for People Empowerment in Governance Books
- Publication date: 2006
- Publication place: Philippines
- Media type: Print
- Pages: 447
- ISBN: 978-971-93651-0-5

Fraud: Gloria Macapagal-Arroyo and the May 2004 Elections is a 2006 book about the electoral scandal surrounding Gloria Macapagal Arroyo's 2004 reelection to the Philippine presidency. Published by the Center for People Empowerment in Governance Books (CenPEG Books), it was edited by the center's Policy Study director Bobby M. Tuazon, with the preface provided by Temario C. Rivera. The book received positive reviews from critics.

== Critical response ==
Ina Alleco R. Silverio, writing for the news website Bulatlat, gave Fraud a positive review, praising its "staggering" collection of sources and straightforward presentation of evidence in its central argument that President Arroyo and her political allies committed electoral fraud during the 2004 presidential election. Silverio concluded that the book provides the lesson that a reliance on the legal system is not enough against "increasingly despotic regimes" that disregards the law for their gain. Alexander Martin Remollino, a fellow Bulatlat contributor, also shares in the assessment that the book effectively "give[s] a total picture of how the controversial presidential poll of two years ago was desecrated. The patterns are there, the numbers are there – all pointing to a wholesale messing with the people's will."
