= St. Luke's College of Nursing =

St. Luke's College of Nursing refers to either:

- St. Luke's College of Nursing, Trinity University of Asia in the Philippines
- St. Luke's College of Nursing (Japan), a college in Tokyo
- Saint Luke's College of Nursing and Health Sciences, the health sciences focused college of Rockhurst University in the United States
