= BGC Stopover Pavilion =

BGC Stopover Pavilion is a mixed-use development in Bonifacio Global City, Metro Manila, Philippines. It consists of a 16-level 35,000-square-metre (380,000 sq ft) office tower for business process outsourcing companies and a 17,000-square-metre (180,000 sq ft) retail podium with a 2-level basement parking. It is located on Rizal Drive and 32nd Street close to St. Luke's Medical Center. The development is owned by Fort Bonifacio Development Corporation and is expected to be completed in 2015, with the retail area being fully operational in 2014. It is the company's second BPO tower in Bonifacio Global City, after Bonifacio One Technology Tower. As of 2015, construction on the tower has been complete.
