= St. Luke's Medical Center – Global City =

Private hospital in Taguig, Philippines

- St. Luke's Medical Center, Inc.

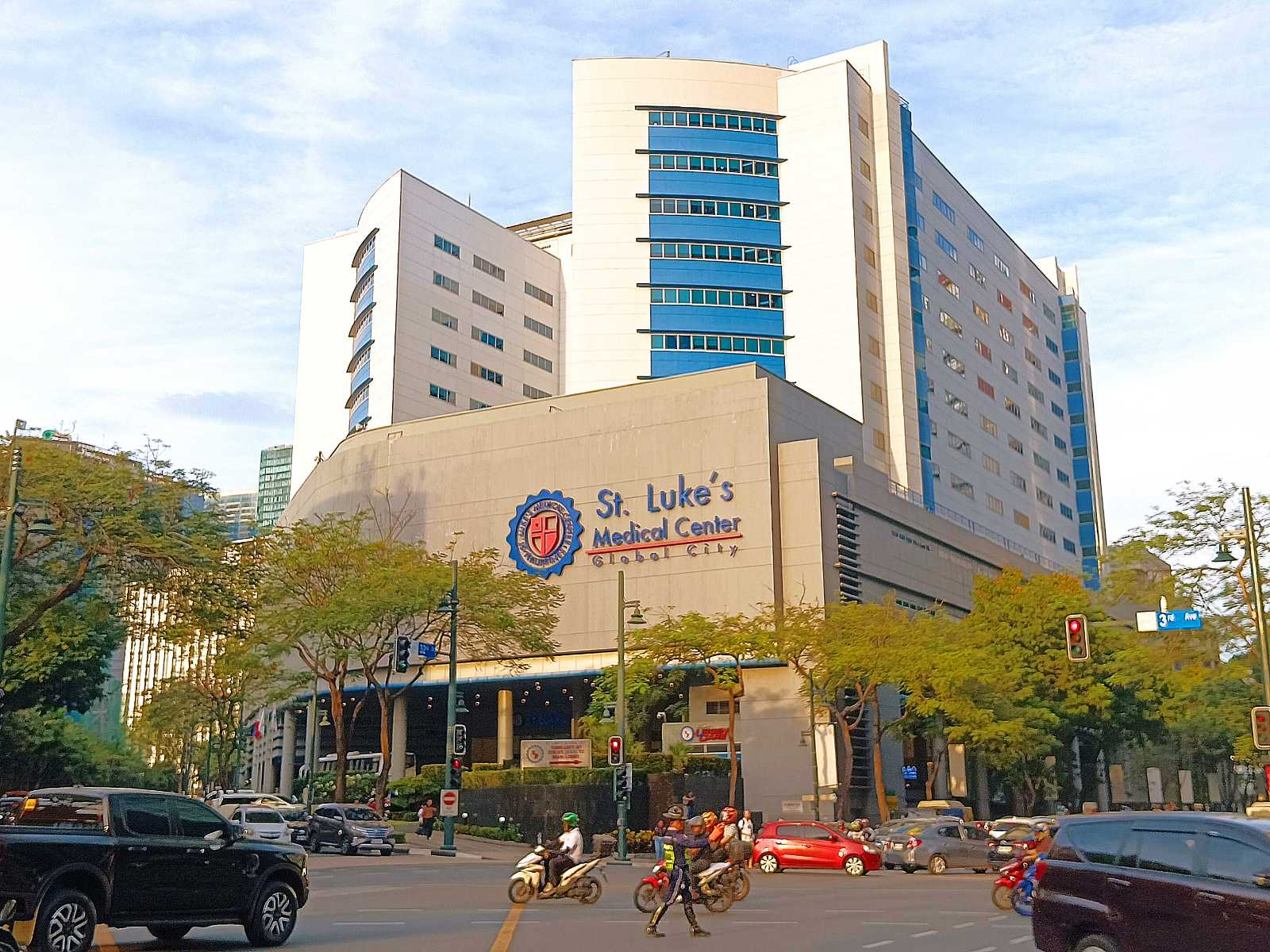

Geography
- Location: Bonifacio Global City, Taguig, Metro Manila, Philippines
- Coordinates: 14°33′18″N 121°02′54″E

Services
- Beds: 600

Helipads
- Helipad: Yes

Links
- Website: www.stlukes.com.ph
- Building details

General information
- Opened: January 16, 2010; 16 years ago
- Cost: ₱9 billion

Technical details
- Floor count: Nursing Tower: 14; Medical Arts Building : 11; Hospital Podium : 7

Design and construction
- Architecture firm: RR Payumo and Associates
- Developer: First Balfour and Makati Development Corporation

Other information
- Parking: 1,000 slots

St. Luke's Medical Center – Global City is a private hospital located in Bonifacio Global City, Fort Bonifacio, Taguig, Philippines. It is the sister facility of the hospital of the same name in Quezon City. Both are affiliated with the Episcopal Church of the Philippines.

== History ==
The hospital at the Bonifacio Global City is an offshoot of the hospital of the same name in Quezon City which was established in Tondo, Manila in 1903 (the hospital moved to Quezon City in 1961). On January 16, 2010, the hospital was inaugurated by then President Gloria Macapagal Arroyo.

== Architecture and design ==
The hospital in 2018

The hospital was designed by architecture firm RR Payumo and Associates and the construction costed around ₱9 billion. A joint venture between First Balfour and Makati Development Corporation was involved in the construction of the hospital. Upon its inauguration the health facility hosts a 14-storey nursing tower with a capacity of 600 beds, a helipad and a podium, along with an 11-storey medical arts building which can house clinics for 374 doctors and a ground floor with lobbies described as "hotel-like", and a multi-level parking with at least 1,000 parking slots. The hospital's gross floor area is about 154,000 square meters (1,660,000 sq ft).

== Facilities ==
The hospital hosts 10 institutes dedicated to cancer, digestive and liver diseases, eyes, neurosciences, orthopedics and sports medicine, pathology, pediatrics and child care, pulmonary medicines, and radiology. It also has 18 operating rooms, five delivery rooms, imaging suites, ancillary outpatient services, critical care units, catheterization laboratory, OB-gynecology complex and post anesthetic care units. The center in Global City houses 10 institutes for the heart, cancer, neurosciences, digestive and liver diseases, eyes, orthopedics and sports medicine, pathology, pediatrics and child care, pulmonary medicines and radiology.

In January, 2024, St. Luke’s Medical Center unveiled the first in the Philippines latest version of da Vinci Surgical System in its main lobby. It also opened its Center for Structural Heart and Vascular Interventions including Transcatheter Aortic Valve Replacement (TAVR) and trans-catheter mitral valve repair (Mitra Clip).

== Reception ==
United States based magazine, Healthcare Management News and Insights, list St. Lukes Medical Center - Global City as part of its "World’s Most Beautiful Hospitals" on its March 2012 issue where the hospital was ranked 11th out of the 25 listed. The hospitals were rated by the magazine's editors according to their interior and exterior features, as well as their "health-promoting" features. St. Lukes was only one of the three Asian hospitals on the list.
