= Samuel Ong =

Filipino whistleblower (1945–2009)

Samuel Ong (1945–2009) was a former deputy director of the National Bureau of Investigation (NBI) of the Philippines and is a whistleblower, declaring that the 2004 national elections was rigged, starting an electoral crisis.

In 2005, Ong announced he was in possession of a set of four original audio tapes, made as part of a wiretapping operation conducted by Air Force T/Sgt. Vidal Doble of military intelligence, containing a recording of a conversation between President Gloria Arroyo and Virgilio Garcillano, an official of the Commission on Elections. Ong claimed that the tapes incriminate Arroyo and all of the other politicians who were officially declared winners of the 2004 elections.

In 2005, Ong was charged with sedition, for allegedly calling for civil disobedience.

Ong died of lung cancer aged 64.
