= Trinity University of Asia =

Private university in Quezon City, Philippines

- Pamantasang Trinitas ng Asya (Filipino)
- Former name: Trinity College of Quezon City (1963–2006)
- Motto: Pro Deo et Patria (Latin)
- Motto in English: For God and Country
- Type: Private, research, non-profit and basic and higher education institution
- Established: 1907 (Trinity University of Asia-St. Luke's College of Nursing); 1963 (Trinity College of Quezon City)
- Religious affiliation: Protestant (Episcopalian) and Aglipayan funded but independent in governance (Nonsectarian)
- Academic affiliations: ACUCA, ACSCU, UBCHEA, FAPC, CUAC, PAASCU, IPS-L
- Chairman: Jerry M. Navarette
- President: Gisela Luna
- Vice-president: Howell Ho (Academic Affairs); Matilde Asuncion (Administration & Finance)
- Principal: Marco Ortaleza (Principal, Basic Education)
- Students: > 6,000
- Location: 275 E. Rodriguez Sr. Blvd., Cathedral Heights Quezon City, Metro Manila, Philippines; 14°37′17.27″N 121°1′18.75″E
- Campus: Urban
- Alma Mater song: Trinity Hymn
- Colors: Green and White
- Nickname: White Stallions
- Sporting affiliations: UCAA
- Website: www.tua.edu.ph
- Location in Metro Manila Location in Luzon Location in the Philippines

Trinity University of Asia (formerly Trinity College of Quezon City), also known as TUA or simply Trinity, is a private Protestant (Anglican/Episcopalian) affiliated research university located in Quezon City, Philippines. It was named after Trinity College (Connecticut) whose president then was the founder's father. Formally established in 1963 as an elementary, high school and collegiate educational institution by the Protestant Episcopalians, it dates back its earliest establishment in 1907 when the Trinity University of Asia - St. Luke's College of Nursing, its oldest organic academic unit, was established under the St. Luke's Hospital, the present day St. Luke's Medical Center. It later acquired its university status on July 18, 2006.

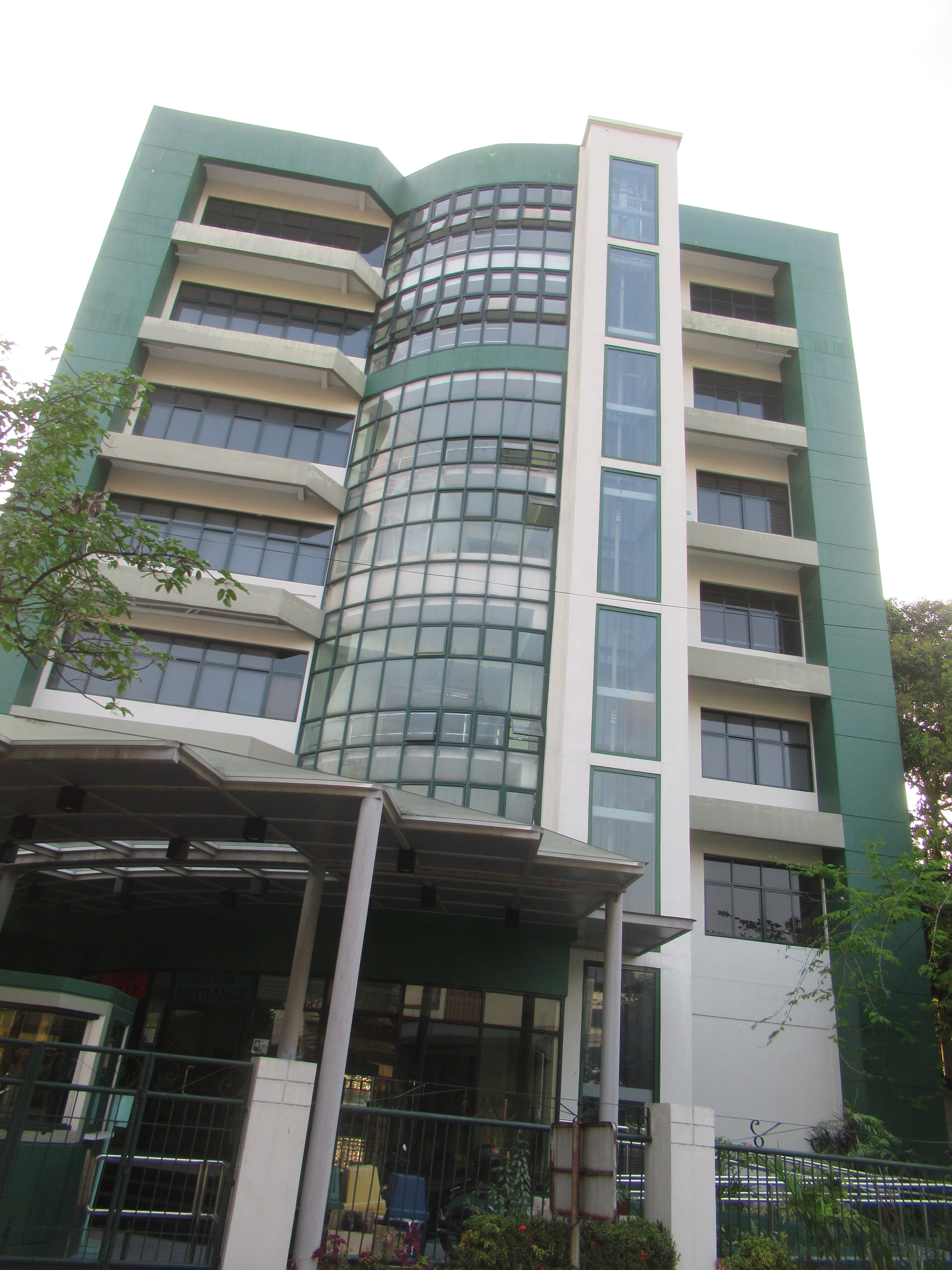
Facade in April 2023

Trinity is affiliated with St. Luke's Medical Center as its university hospital, a healthcare institution founded by the Protestant Episcopalians as the third American and Protestant hospital in the Philippines.

Trinity University of Asia is one of only five universities in the Philippines with current Institutional Accreditation granted by the Federation of Accrediting Agencies of the Philippines (FAAP).

The university is also one of few universities in the Philippines that have been granted full autonomous status by CHED. As of October 2009, only 44 (2.5%) out of 1,726 higher educational institutions in the Philippines had been granted autonomous status by CHED. Trinity University of Asia is one of the Centers of Development in Nursing Education in the Philippines.

The university is also included in the 2021 TFETIMES "Best Universities in the Philippines" list.

At present, it maintains accord and academic affiliation with the American founded universities in the country, the Central Philippine University and Silliman University.

== History ==
=== Protestantism in the Philippines and Trinity's establishment ===
Protestantism developed in the Philippines when the United States took possession of the Philippines with the 1898 Treaty of Paris. United States rule allowed more opportunity for missionaries to enter the Philippines than under Spanish rule. In addition, there was a backlash against the Catholicism of the Spanish and a greater acceptance of Protestant Christianity represented by the Americans. The dominance of the Catholic Church in the Philippines and Protestant animosity towards Catholicism were prominent reasons for the start of Protestant missionary activity. In 1901 the Evangelical Union was established in the Philippines to co-ordinate activities amongst the Protestant denominations and lay the foundations for an indigenous religious movement.

Manila was opened to all denominations and mission agencies. The Seventh-day Adventist Church and Protestant Episcopalians did not join because they wanted to go to all parts of the archipelago.

It was during such time when the inception of establishing a Protestant Episcopalian school and hospital was conceived. Episcopalian American missionaries established the St. Luke's Medical Center in 1903 which later the Trinity University of Asia is closely affiliated with.

St. Luke's foundation as a dispensary in 1903 by the Episcopalians as the second Protestant hospital in the Philippines after Iloilo Mission Hospital of Central Philippine University in Iloilo, has made it grow and become one of the renowned healthcare institutions in the country.

The Trinity University of Asia-St. Luke's College of Nursing, a collegiate and organic unit of the university founded in 1907 as St. Luke's Hospital School of Nursing, is the precursor and oldest academic unit predating Trinity's founding by 56 years.

Since the Philippines was divided into various Protestant missions, Trinity University of Asia at present, maintaints accord and linkage with other Protestant and American founded institutions in the country - Silliman University (Protestant Presbyterian) and Central Philippine University (Protestant Baptist).

=== Trinity College of Quezon City ===
Trinity College of Quezon City was launched through the bequest of the Procter and Gamble stock of the family of Rt. Rev. Lyman C. Ogilby, then Bishop of the Philippine Episcopal Church, initiated the move to set up a Christian college. The seed money was used to purchase the former Capitol City College on 226 Eulogio Rodriguez Senior Boulevard, Quezon City, the current location of the university's elementary and high schools.

Initially there were 1,700 students enrolled. The College offered Basic Education and three collegiate courses - Liberal Arts, Commerce, and Teacher Education. That same year, the first Board of Trustees, headed by the Rev. Wayland S. Mandell, was convened, and the first College President, Dr. Arthur L. Carson, was installed. By 1965, the Joint Council of the Church led by Bishop Ogilby of the Philippine Episcopal Church and Bishop Isabelo de los Reyes Jr. of the Iglesia Filipina Independiente approved the transfer of the collegiate courses to the college's present location, the Cathedral Heights compound. The Arts and Science Building was the sole structure for all the colleges, until St. Luke's Hospital School of Nursing merged with TCQC to form a five-year collegiate course in nursing. St. Luke's Nurse's Home became part of the college's expansion, where it provided space for teaching. A medical technology course was later affiliated with Trinity College, and the Graduate School followed in 1985.

From a one-building structure, Trinity College built Wayland Mandell Hall, which houses the Main Library (1982), Noble Gym (1973), Ann Keim Barsam Hall for the Colleges of Education and Business Administration (2003), Health Science Building (2004) for the College of Nursing and Medical Technology, Center for Community and Extension Services (1995), Human Kinetics swimming pool (2002), the Canteen (2003), and the Mary Niven Alston Hostel for the College of Hospitality and Tourism Management (2006).

Many of Trinity's nursing graduates go on to pass the licensure exams in nursing, medical technology, and education. In 2007, Trinity's College of Nursing landed on the 1st spot among the top performing schools in board exams with a 99% passing rate. In a very recent 2009 report filed by the CHED, Trinity continued to remain as one of the Top 20 Nursing schools in the country by landing in the 3rd spot.

All the programs of the college were also accredited very satisfactory by accrediting agencies. The programs in the colleges of Arts and Sciences were given Level IV, 3-year accreditation, while the college of Business Administration, Education, and Graduate Studies were given Level III, 5-year accreditation by Association of Christian Schools, Colleges and Universities (ACSCU). Moreover, the Colleges of Nursing and Medical Technology received Level 2, 3 years from Philippine Accrediting Association of Schools, Colleges and Universities (PAASCU).

The University has international programs, such as the International Partnership for Service-Learning and Japan Foundation's Japanology course. It is a beneficiary of the United Board for Christian Higher Education in Asia (UBCHEA) and an active member of international organizations such as the Association of Christian Universities and Colleges in Asia (ACUCA), Federation of Asia-Pacific Colleges, and Colleges and Universities of the Anglican Communion (CUAC).

=== Naming ===
In 1963, the Capitol City College was renamed, Trinity College of Quezon City, after Trinity College (Connecticut), USA whose then president was Bishop Ogilby's father. In 2006 it became a university and changed its name to Trinity University of Asia, becoming one of the Anglican/Episcopalian universities in Asia.

== Membership in organizations ==
Trinity University of Asia is a member of the following national and international organizations:

- Association of Christian Schools, Colleges and Universities (ACSCU)
- Philippine Association of Accredited Schools, Colleges and Universities (PAASCU)
- Universities and Colleges Athletic Association (UCAA)
- International Partnership for Service-Learning (IPS-L)
- United Board for Christian Higher Education in Asia (UBCHEA)
- Association of Christian Universities and Colleges in Asia (ACUCA)
- Federation of Asia-Pacific Colleges
- Colleges and Universities of Anglican Communion (CUAC)
