= St. Luke's College of Medicine (Philippines) =

Private medical school in Quezon City, Philippines

- Type: Private
- Established: June 1994; 32 years ago
- Chairman: Frederick Dy
- President: Susan Pelea Nagtalon
- Location: Santa Ignaciana St., Kalusugan, Quezon City, Metro Manila, Philippines; 14°37′26″N 121°01′23″E
- Website: stlukesmedcollege.edu.ph
- Location in Metro Manila Location in Luzon Location in the Philippines

St. Luke's College of Medicine – William H. Quasha Memorial (SLCM-WHQM) is a tertiary medical school in Quezon City, Philippines. It is situated behind the St. Luke's Medical Center, the base hospital of the college.

== History ==
The medical school was established in 1994. In June 1997, the 14-story College of Medicine building which hosts the medical school was completed. The school opened its scholarship program in 2005.

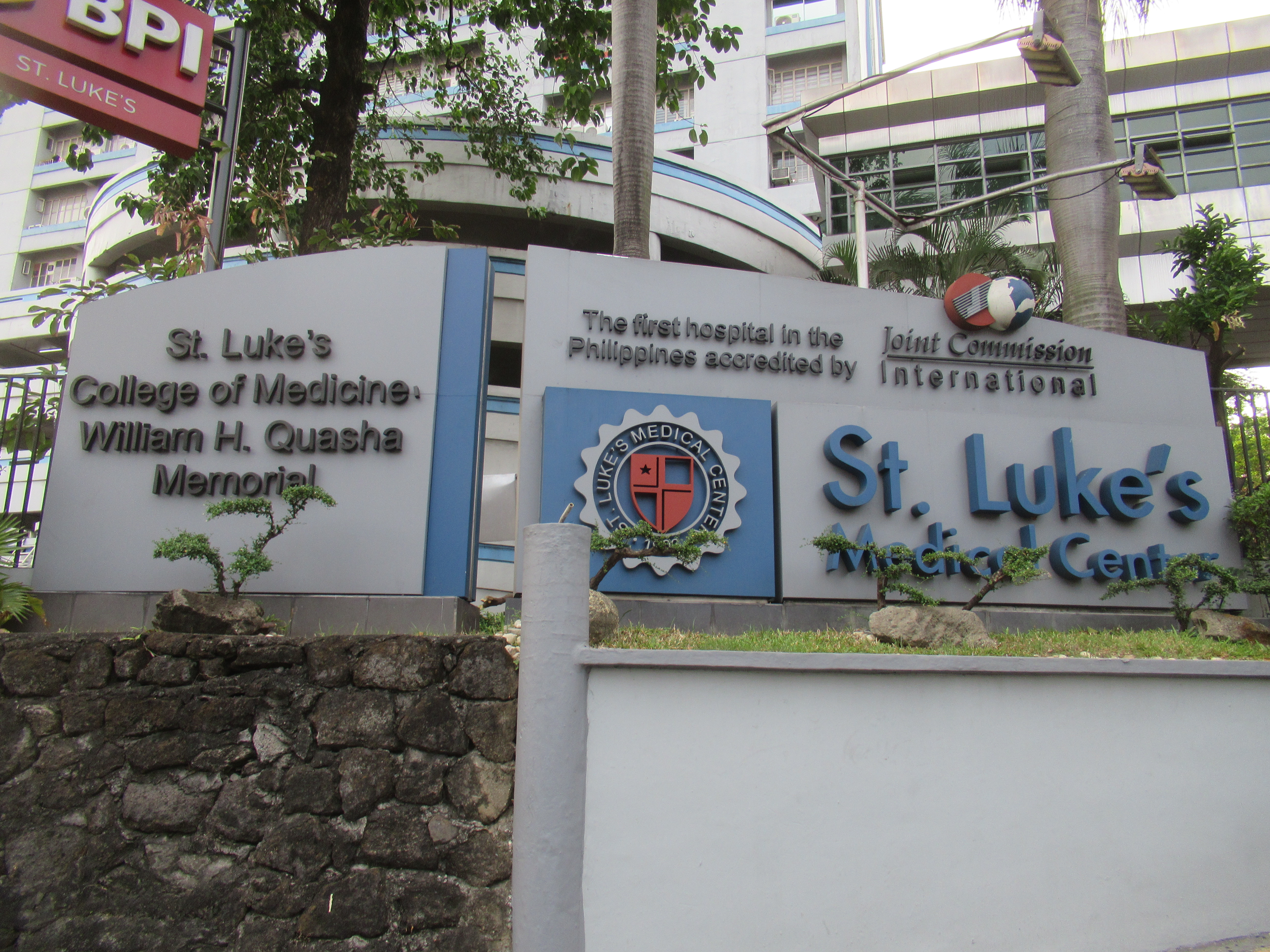
Gate

== Facilities ==
The campus contains five air-conditioned lecture halls, as well as smaller classrooms and discussion rooms. The five basic science laboratories can be used to perform dissections, slide microscopy, and experiments. The skills training laboratory is equipped with models and simulators for the development and refinement of medical skills. The behavioral science laboratory features a tinted mirror and allows the students to learn the skills of a psychiatric exam. A mock operating room is also available for students to practice surgical skills.

== Students ==
For the school year of 2015–2016, 538 students from first to fifth year enrolled in the school. Students on their fifth year serve as interns for the St. Luke's Medical Center, something which students from other schools have to apply for.
