= Gloria Macapagal Arroyo =

President of the Philippines from 2001 to 2010

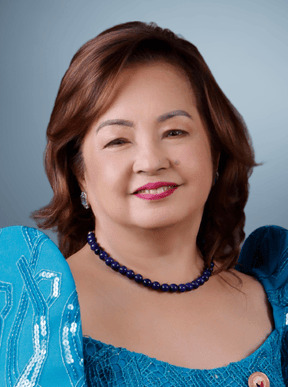
- Official portrait, 2026

14th President of the Philippines
- In office January 20, 2001 – June 30, 2010
- Vice President: None (January 20 – February 7, 2001); Teofisto Guingona Jr. (2001–2004); Noli de Castro (2004–2010)
- Preceded by: Joseph Estrada
- Succeeded by: Benigno Aquino III

10th Vice President of the Philippines
- In office June 30, 1998 – January 20, 2001
- President: Joseph Estrada
- Preceded by: Joseph Estrada
- Succeeded by: Teofisto Guingona Jr.

25th Speaker of the House of Representatives of the Philippines
- In office July 23, 2018 – June 30, 2019
- Preceded by: Pantaleon Alvarez
- Succeeded by: Alan Peter Cayetano

Secretary of National Defense
- Officer in Charge; November 30, 2006 – February 1, 2007
- President: Herself
- Preceded by: Avelino Cruz
- Succeeded by: Hermogenes Ebdane
- Acting; September 1, 2003 – October 2, 2003
- President: Herself
- Preceded by: Angelo Reyes
- Succeeded by: Eduardo Ermita

21st Secretary of Social Welfare and Development
- In office June 30, 1998 – October 12, 2000
- President: Joseph Estrada
- Preceded by: Lilian Laigo
- Succeeded by: Dulce Saguisag

Senator of the Philippines
- In office June 30, 1992 – June 29, 1998 (Note: Original term until June 30, 2001; resigned on June 29, 1998, to sit as Vice President.)

Senior Deputy Speaker of the House of Representatives of the Philippines
- In office July 25, 2022 – May 17, 2023 Serving with several others
- House Speaker: Martin Romualdez
- Succeeded by: Aurelio Gonzales Jr.
- In office August 15, 2016 – March 15, 2017 Serving with several others
- House Speaker: Pantaleon Alvarez
- Preceded by: Roberto Puno
- Succeeded by: Linabelle Villarica

Deputy Speaker of the House of Representatives of the Philippines
- In office May 17, 2023 – November 7, 2023 Serving with several others
- Preceded by: Aurelio Gonzales Jr.
- Succeeded by: Tonypet Albano

Member of the Philippine House of Representatives from Pampanga's 2nd congressional district
- Incumbent
- Assumed office June 30, 2022
- Preceded by: Mikey Arroyo
- In office June 30, 2010 – June 30, 2019
- Preceded by: Mikey Arroyo
- Succeeded by: Mikey Arroyo

Presidential Adviser on Clark Flagship Programs and Projects
- In office November 26, 2020 – October 4, 2021
- President: Rodrigo Duterte

Undersecretary of the Department of Trade and Industry
- In office 1987–1992
- President: Corazon Aquino

Chair-Emerita of Lakas-CMD
- Incumbent
- Assumed office 2008
- Preceded by: Position established

Personal details
- Born: Maria Gloria Macaraeg Macapagal; April 5, 1947 (age 79) Ermita, Manila, Philippines
- Party: Lakas (1998–2017; 2020–present)
- Other political affiliations: PDP–Laban (2017–2020); KAMPI (1997–2008); LDP (1992–1998)
- Spouse: Jose Miguel Arroyo (m. 1968)
- Children: 3, including Mikey and Dato
- Parents: Diosdado Macapagal (father); Eva Macapagal (mother)
- Education: Georgetown University; Assumption College San Lorenzo (BA); Ateneo de Manila University (MEcon); University of the Philippines Diliman (PhD)
- Occupation: Politician
- Profession: Economist; professor
- Gloria Macapagal-Arroyo's voice Excerpt from her departure speech for U.S. visit (Recorded on July 29, 2009)

Maria Gloria Macaraeg Macapagal-Arroyo (Tagalog: [ˈɡloɾja makapaˈɡal ʔaˈɾojo]; born April 5, 1947), often referred to as PGMA or GMA, is a Filipino academic and politician who served as the 14th president of the Philippines from 2001 to 2010. She is the longest-serving president since Ferdinand Marcos. Before her presidency, she was the 10th vice president of the Philippines from 1998 to 2001 under President Joseph Estrada, becoming the first female vice president. She was also a senator from 1992 to 1998. After her presidency, she was elected as the representative of Pampanga's 2nd district in 2010 and continues to serve in this role. She also served as the speaker of the House from 2018 to 2019, becoming the first woman to hold the office and lead in either chamber of Congress, and as deputy speaker from 2016 to 2017 and 2022 to 2023. Alongside former President Sergio Osmeña, she is one of only two Filipinos to hold at least three of the four highest offices: vice president, president, and house speaker.

Arroyo is the first president to succeed the presidency as the child of a previous president; her father was Diosdado Macapagal, the country's ninth president from 1961 to 1965. She studied economics at Georgetown University in the United States, where she became friends with her classmate and future U.S. president Bill Clinton. She then became a professor of economics at the Ateneo de Manila University, where her eventual successor, President Benigno Aquino III, was one of her students. She entered government in 1987 as assistant secretary and undersecretary of the Department of Trade and Industry under President Corazon Aquino, Benigno's mother.

After Estrada was accused of corruption, Arroyo resigned from her cabinet position as secretary of the Department of Social Welfare and Development and joined the opposition against the president. Estrada was ousted by the Second EDSA Revolution in 2001, and Arroyo was sworn in as president by Chief Justice Hilario Davide Jr. on January 20. The Oakwood mutiny occurred in 2003 during her administration. She was elected to a full six-year term in the controversial 2004 presidential election and was sworn in on June 30, 2004. A long-time opponent of the death penalty, she abolished capital punishment in 2006 after commuting the death sentences of over 1,200 prisoners.

On November 18, 2011, Arroyo was arrested and held at the Veterans Memorial Medical Center in Quezon City on charges of electoral sabotage but released on bail in July 2012. These charges were later dropped for lack of evidence. She was rearrested in October 2012 on charges of misuse of $8.8 million in state lottery funds. She was given a hospital arrest due to life-threatening health conditions. During the presidency of Rodrigo Duterte, the Supreme Court acquitted her by a vote of 11–4. Also, the Supreme Court declared the Department of Justice's 'hold departure orders' unconstitutional. Arroyo's lawyers stated afterward that she no longer needed her medical paraphernalia.

Arroyo is a member of the Philippine Academy of the Spanish Language and supported the teaching of Spanish in the country's education system during her presidency.

During her presidency, Arroyo emphasized the Philippines' participation in regional cooperation through the Association of Southeast Asian Nations (ASEAN). In January 2007, she chaired the 12th ASEAN Summit in Cebu, where regional leaders discussed strengthening ASEAN integration, promoting economic development, and improving regional stability. The summit also adopted the Cebu Declaration on the Blueprint of the ASEAN Charter, which guided the drafting of the ASEAN Charter.

== Early life and education ==
Gloria Macapagal Arroyo was born as Maria Gloria Macaraeg Macapagal on April 5, 1947, in San Juan, Metro Manila, to lawyer Diosdado Macapagal and his wife, Evangelina de la Cruz Macaraeg. She is the sister of Diosdado "Boboy" Macapagal Jr. and has two older siblings from her father's first marriage with Purita de la Rosa, the sister of Rogelio de la Rosa, Arturo Macapagal, and Cielo Macapagal Salgado. She was raised mostly in Lubao, Pampanga, and during summer vacations, she lived with her maternal grandmother in Iligan City. Gloria remembered her grandmother's house as a "kingdom" according to the H. W. Wilson Company. After the Philippines' independence from the United States, Macapagal ran for president, promising to clean up the government. He won the election and, at 14 years old, Gloria moved with her family into Malacañang Palace in Manila.

Arroyo attended Assumption Convent for her high school education, graduating valedictorian in 1964. Arroyo then studied for two years at Georgetown University in Washington, D.C., studying A.B. Economics, where she was a classmate and friend of future United States president Bill Clinton. She finished another degree at the Assumption College in Manila, gaining a B.S. in Commerce. After, she enrolled at the Ateneo de Manila University, graduating in 1976 with a master's in economics. After, she enrolled in the University of the Philippines Ph.D. program in Economics from 1985 to 1986. In an interview with the Philippine Daily Inquirer, she revealed that her father wanted her to become an entrepreneur, and she had several goals: to be a teacher, pilot, then a professional working for a government.

== Early career ==
Arroyo began her professional career as an assistant professor at the Ateneo de Manila University from 1977 to 1987 while simultaneously being a professor at the University of the Philippines School of Economics. From 1984 to 1987, she chaired the Economic Department of the Assumption Convent College. In 1987, she entered government service, becoming the Assistant Secretary of the Department of Trade and Industry (DTI) and the Executive Director of the Garments and Textile Export Board. She then became the Undersecretary of Trade and Industry.

== Senator (1992–1998) ==
Arroyo entered politics in the 1992 election, running for senator. At the first general election under the 1987 Constitution, the top twelve vote-getting senatorial candidates would win a six-year term, and the next twelve candidates would win a three-year term. She won a seat in the Senate. After she won, Arroyo told the Philippine Daily Inquirer that the men in her life had been supportive of her political career. In 1995, she ran again. This time, her husband was her campaign manager. In the election, she won with 16 million votes—the most votes in the election.

As a legislator, Arroyo filed over 400 bills and authored or sponsored 55 laws during her tenure as senator, including the Anti-Sexual Harassment Law, the Indigenous People's Rights Law, and the Export Development Act. Arroyo was also openly against the implementation of capital punishment in the country, advocating instead for better criminal rehabilitation during her time as Senator. Manila Standard Journalist Emil P. Jurado detailed Arroyo as Senator Edgardo Angara's "worst nightmare". On September 2, 1997, Arroyo said that the next president would have to strengthen the rural health-care program to ensure the youth are "technically prepared", adding that health and education were her main concerns.

Arroyo proposed the moving of school from June to March to September to June to save students from issues during a typhoon, stating that: "I think we are going against the logic of the seasons when we insist in holding classes during the wet months." During her Senate tenure, she also hosted a television show where she travelled to rural areas to focus on farmers. She also advised political leaders in Mindanao to lead their communities in rejecting fundamentalist extremism, stating that fundamentalist extremism, whether Muslim or Christian, remains the "biggest stumbling block" in the movement to attain peace in Mindanao.

== Vice presidency (1998–2001) ==
Arroyo considered a run for the presidency in the 1998 election with Senator Tito Sotto as her running mate, but was persuaded by Manila Archbishop Jaime Cardinal Sin, President Fidel V. Ramos, and leaders of the administration party Lakas–NUCD to instead seek the vice-presidency as the running mate of its presidential candidate, House Speaker Jose de Venecia, Jr. Before dropping her presidential candidacy, she was put against Joseph Estrada—a former actor. She considered the presidency a race between her, a woman, and Estrada, a womanizer. Filipino Overseas Filipino Workers in Hong Kong supported the candidacy of Arroyo, stating that her win will be another one for "the OFWs, the youth, and the entire nation itself." Though de Venecia lost to Estrada, Arroyo won the vice presidency with 12.6 million votes, higher than Senator Edgardo Angara's 5.6 million, the running mate of Estrada. Her vote count was higher than Estrada's 10.9 million.

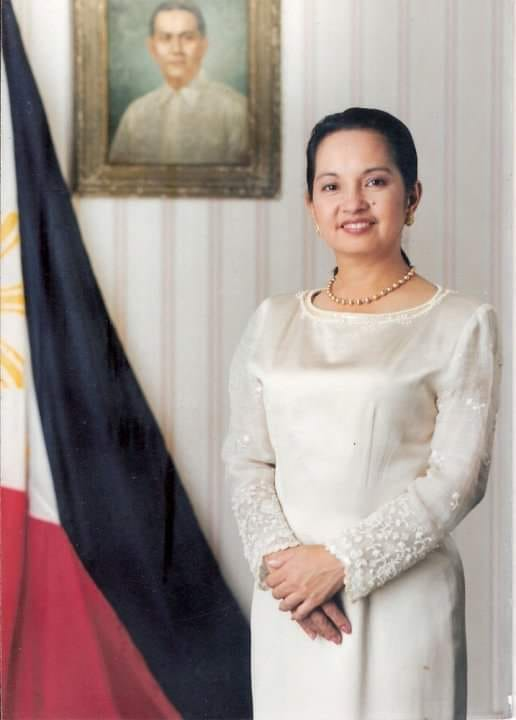
Official portrait, 1998

Arroyo began her term as vice president on June 30, 1998, becoming the first female to hold the post. She was appointed by Estrada to a concurrent position in the cabinet as secretary of social welfare and development. As vice president, she was noted by political observers to continuously take a neutral stance on issues facing the government. During her vice presidency, she initiated an early child development program and used foreign money for welfare projects. A correspondent for The Economist opined that "when there is an earthquake, a flood, or a big fire, Mrs. Arroyo's agency will be seen leading the rescue. In 1998, a regional crisis in Asia hit the Philippines, leading the value of the Philippine peso to plummet and the unemployment rate to rise. Through economic reforms done under the International Monetary Fund, the H.W. Wilson Company reported that the Philippines "did not suffer as much" as the other countries affected.

Senate President Blas Ople urged Arroyo to resign from the Cabinet on April 7, 2000, stating that her Cabinet position was a "case of conflict of interest". Other Senators told Arroyo to "clarify her position" in the cabinet. Arroyo resigned from the Cabinet in October 2000, distancing herself from Estrada, who was accused of corruption by a former political supporter, Chavit Singson, Governor of Ilocos Sur. She had initially resisted pressure from allies to speak out against Estrada, but eventually joined calls for Estrada's resignation.

== Presidency (2001–2010) ==
=== First term (2001–2004) ===
==== Succession ====
On October 18, opposition groups filed an impeachment complaint against Joseph Estrada with the House of Representatives. The complaint was passed and transmitted to the Senate in November, resulting in the impeachment trial's start in December. On January 16, 2001, the impeachment trial "gripped the public imagination" according to Cristina Eloisa Baclig of the Philippine Daily Inquirer. Private prosecutors walked out of the trial when pro-Estrada senators prevented the opening of a brown envelope. It allegedly contained bank documents linking President Joseph Estrada to money laundering and hidden wealth, through the use of an alias. From January 16 to 20, hundreds of thousands of Filipinos gathered at Epifanio de los Santos Avenue (EDSA), the site of the original People Power Revolution. Officials of the administration also withdrew their support for President Estrada. On the last day, Arroyo took her oath on EDSA, declaring herself as the 14th President of the Philippines. Estrada opposed this decision but left the Malacañang Palace for "national reconciliation".

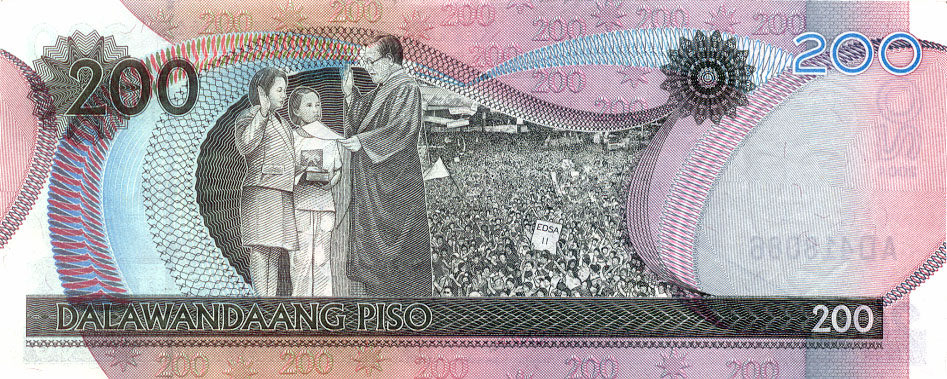
Arroyo displayed on a New Design series two hundred-peso banknote, being sworn in as president by Chief Justice Hilario Davide Jr. in January 2001

Days after leaving Malacañang Palace, President Estrada's lawyers and allies questioned the legitimacy of Arroyo's presidency before the Supreme Court, with Senator Miriam Defensor Santiago among the more outspoken politicians to call for his reinstatement as president. In the last week of April 2001, the Sandiganbayan ordered the arrest of Estrada and his son, then mayor Jinggoy Estrada, for plunder charges. A few days later, Estrada supporters protested his arrest, gathered at the EDSA Shrine, and staged what they called, EDSA III. Thousands of protesters demanded the release of Estrada and called for the ouster of Arroyo and the reinstatement of the former. On May 1, 2001, they marched towards Malacañang to force Arroyo to give in to their demands. Due to fights between police and protesters, three people—two cops and one protester—died. Arroyo declared a state of rebellion due to the violence. On July 27, 2003, the Oakwood mutiny occurred in the Philippines, consisting of group of over 300 soldiers led by Army Capt. Gerardo Gambala and Navy Lt. Antonio Trillanes IV. The soldiers took over the Oakwood Premier Ayala Center in Makati and, after arrangements, called for Arroyo's resignation as well as improvements for soldiers and military systems. Negotiations then happened and, due to the lack of support from the public, the mutiny ended after 20 hours. During the mutiny, Arroyo declared a state of rebellion.

==== 2004 presidential election ====
Presidential styles of Gloria Macapagal Arroyo
- Reference style: Her Excellency
- Spoken style: Your Excellency
- Alternative style: Madam President

Article VII Section 4 of the 1987 Constitution explicitly states that the president of the Philippines can only serve for one term. However, the same provision also implicitly states that a president's successor who has not served for more than four years can still seek a full term for the presidency. Although Arroyo fell under this category, she initially announced on December 29, 2002, that she would not seek the presidency in 2004. She emphasized that she would devote her remaining months in office to serving the people and improving the economy of the Philippines.

In October 2003, Arroyo changed her mind and announced that she will run in the May 2004 presidential elections and seek a direct mandate from the people. She explained, "There is a higher cause — to change society...in a way that flourishes our future". With her decision, the initial criticisms hurled against Arroyo centered on her lack of word of honor. Arroyo's presidential bid was endorsed by controversial religious group Iglesia ni Cristo (INC).

As predicted by SWS exit polls, Arroyo won the election by a margin of over one million votes against Poe. However, the congressional canvassing was quite contentious as opposition lawmakers in the National Board of Canvassers argued that there were many discrepancies in the election returns and that insinuations of cheating were raised. On June 23, 2004, Congress proclaimed Arroyo and Noli de Castro as president and vice president, respectively.

=== Second term (2004–2010) ===
==== 2004 presidential election rigging allegations ====
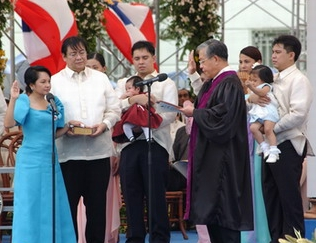
Arroyo taking her Oath of Office for a full term as president before Chief Justice Hilario Davide Jr. in Cebu City on June 30, 2004.

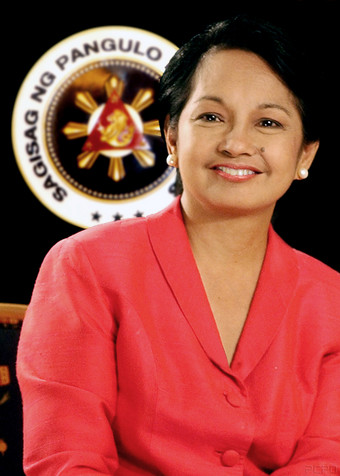
Official portrait, 2004

On June 30, 2004, in a break with tradition, Arroyo first delivered her inaugural speech at the Quirino Grandstand in Manila. She then departed for Cebu City for her oath taking, the first time that a Philippine president took the oath of office outside of Luzon.

Allegations of cheating against Arroyo gained momentum one year after the May 2004 elections. In a press conference held on June 10, 2005, Samuel Ong, former deputy director of the National Bureau of Investigation (NBI) claimed to have audio recordings of wiretapped conversations between Arroyo and an official of the Commission on Elections (COMELEC). Virgilio Garcillano, a former COMELEC commissioner, would later be identified as the official talking to Arroyo. According to Ong, the recordings allegedly proved that Arroyo ordered the rigging of the national elections for her to win by around one million votes against Poe.

The recordings of Ong became known as the Hello Garci controversy and triggered massive protests against Arroyo. Key members of her cabinet resigned from their respective posts and urged Arroyo to do the same. On June 27, 2005, Arroyo admitted to inappropriately speaking to a COMELEC official, claiming it was a "lapse in judgement". She, however, denied influencing the outcome of the elections and declared that she won the elections fairly. Arroyo did not resign despite the pressures coming from various sectors of society.

The Hello Garci controversy became the basis of the impeachment case filed against Arroyo in 2005; attempts to impeach Arroyo failed later that year. Another impeachment case was filed against Arroyo in 2006 but was also defeated at the House of Representatives.

In October 2007, lawyer Alan Paguia filed an impeachment complaint against Arroyo in connection with the issue of bribery. Paguia's complaint was based on the revelation of Pampanga Governor Ed Panlilio that various governors received half a million pesos from Malacañang. The impeachment case, as of the middle of October 2007, has already been referred to the House of Representatives Committee on Justice. Her tenure also reflected the functioning of established democratic institutions in the Philippines, including the interaction between executive authority, legislative processes, and judicial oversight.

==== 2006 state of emergency ====
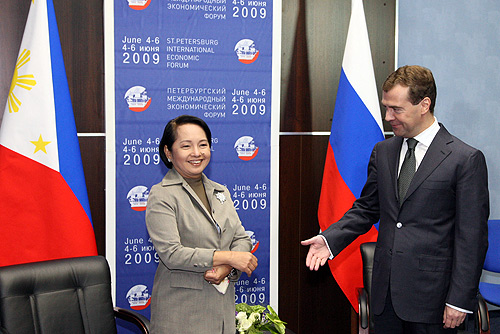
Arroyo with Russian President Dmitry Medvedev, June 9, 2009

On February 24, 2006, a plot to take over the government was uncovered by authorities, allegedly headed by Gen. Danilo Lim and other would-be mutineers. Lim and some of his men were arrested. To face the threat posed by enemies of the state, Arroyo issued Presidential Proclamation 1017 and used it as basis in declaring a state of emergency throughout the Philippines. According to Arroyo, this declaration was done to quell the military rebellion, stop lawless violence, and promote peace and stability. Presidential Proclamation 1017 also empowered the government to enforce warrantless arrests and take over strategic private utilities companies. Several members of the Senate, including Franklin Drilon, Kiko Pangilinan, and Pia Cayetano, condemned the proclamation as it contravenes "the fundamental guarantees of the Constitution, particularly the basic civil liberties enshrined therein."

The state of emergency existed for about one week with the purpose of curbing further violence, illegal rallies, and public disturbance throughout the Philippines. The police and the military dispersed demonstrators and protesters, especially those along EDSA. Along from General Lim, prominent personalities were also arrested in connection with their alleged participation in the attempt to overthrow the government.

Presidential Proclamation 1017 was lifted on March 3, 2006, but members of the opposition, private lawyers, and concerned citizens challenged its constitutionality before the Supreme Court. On May 4, the high court declared the proclamation constitutional; however, it also ruled it was illegal for the government to implement warrantless arrests and seize private institutions and companies.

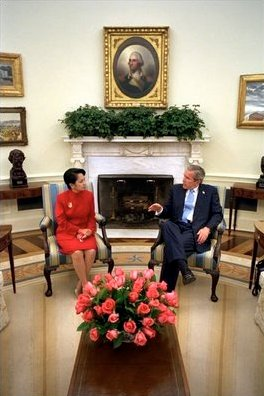
Arroyo with U.S. President George W. Bush, May 19, 2003

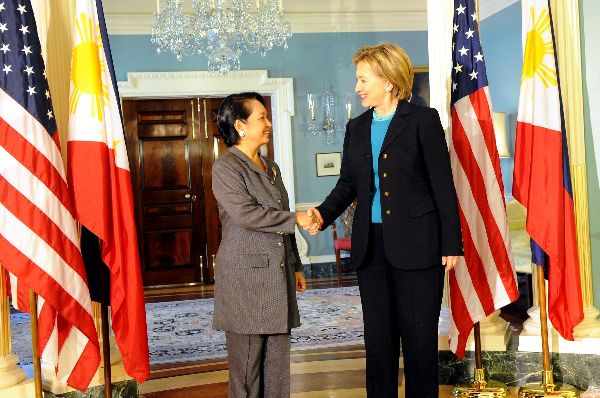
Arroyo with U.S. Secretary of State Hillary Clinton, February 17, 2009

=== Domestic policies ===
==== Education ====
After decades of surveys, consultations, and studies starting with the Monroe Survey in 1925 during the American period, the 9-year implementation process of K–12 curriculum finally began on May 20, 2008 during the Arroyo administration when Senator Mar Roxas filed the Omnibus Education Reform Act of 2008 (Senate Bill 2294) to strengthen the Philippine education system through timely interventions on the quality of teachers, the medium of instruction used and the evaluation of students' aptitude, among other aspects. It mandates the effectivity of K–12 four years later on April 24, 2012 during the administration of Arroyo's successor Benigno Aquino III which increase in the number of years in basic education, from 10 years to 12 years as consistent with global standards.

On January 7, 2010, senator and presidential candidate Benigno Aquino III adopted the position of SB 2294; he said this will "give everyone an equal chance to succeed" and "have quality education and profitable jobs."

==== Economy ====
Arroyo, who earned a master's degree and doctorate in economics, made the Philippine economy the focus of her presidency. Annual economic growth in the Philippines averaged 4.5% during the Arroyo administration, expanding every quarter of her presidency. This is higher than in the administrations of her three immediate predecessors, Corazon Aquino (3.8%), Fidel Ramos (3.7%), and Joseph Estrada (3.7%). The Philippine economy grew at its fastest pace in three decades in 2007, with real GDP growth exceeding 7%. The economy was one of the few to avoid contraction during the 2008 financial crisis, faring better than its regional peers due to minimal exposure to troubled international securities, lower dependence on exports, relatively resilient domestic consumption, large remittances from four-to five-million overseas Filipino workers, and a growing business process outsourcing industry. Arroyo's handling of the economy has earned praise from former US president Bill Clinton, who cited her "tough decisions" that put the Philippine economy back in shape. Despite this growth, the poverty rate remained stagnant due to uneven distribution of income.

A controversial expanded value added tax (e-VAT) law, considered the centerpiece of the Arroyo administration's economic reform agenda, was implemented in November 2005, aiming to complement revenue-raising efforts that could plug the country's large budget deficit. Her administration originally set a target to balance the national budget by 2010. The tax measure boosted confidence in the government's fiscal capacity and helped to strengthen the Philippine peso, making it East Asia's best performing currency in 2005–06. The peso strengthened by nearly 20% in 2007, making it one of Asia's better performing currencies for that year, a fact attributed to a combination of increased remittances from overseas Filipino workers and a strong domestic economy.

Early in her presidency, Arroyo implemented a controversial policy of holiday economics, adjusting holidays to form longer weekends with the purpose of boosting domestic tourism and allowing Filipinos more time with their families.

==== Charter change ====
Arroyo spearheaded a controversial plan for an overhaul of the constitution to transform the present unitary and presidential republic with a bicameral legislature into a federal parliamentary government with a unicameral legislature.

=== Foreign policies ===
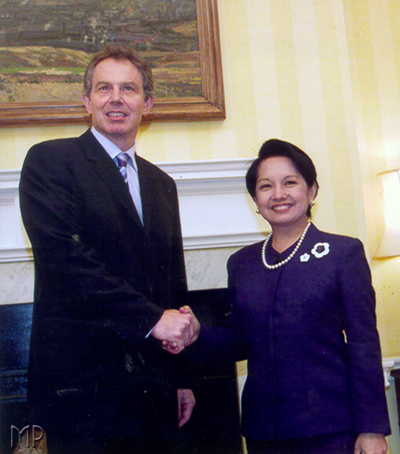
Arroyo with UK Prime Minister Tony Blair, January 28, 2002

=== Public perception ===
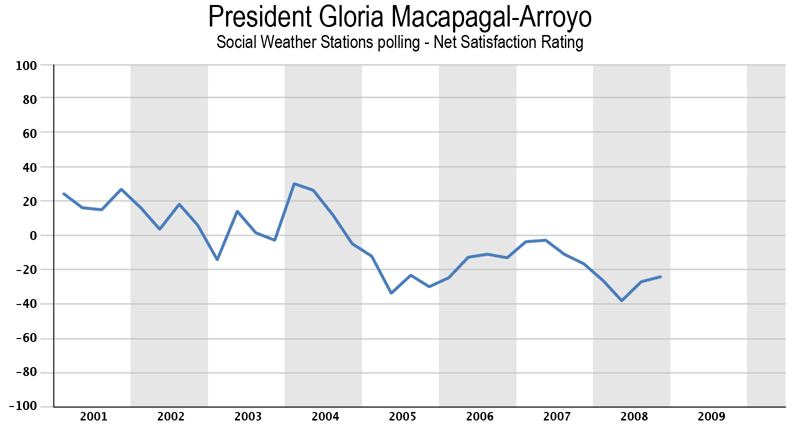
Social Weather Stations quarterly public opinion polling of the net satisfaction rating of President Arroyo

The Social Weather Stations public opinion group has conducted quarterly surveys tracking the net satisfaction rating ("satisfied" rating minus "dissatisfied" rating") of President Arroyo. She began her presidency in the first quarter of 2001 with a net satisfaction rating of +24. Her rating first dipped into the negative in the first quarter of 2003, making Arroyo the only president to achieve a negative net satisfaction rating in SWS opinion polling. Her rating rebounded well into the positive in 2004, in time for the presidential election where she won election to a new six-year term. However, net satisfaction sunk back into negative territory in the fourth quarter of 2004, and has remained negative since, dipping as low as −38 in the second quarter of 2008. Her net satisfaction rating in the first quarter of 2009 was −32.

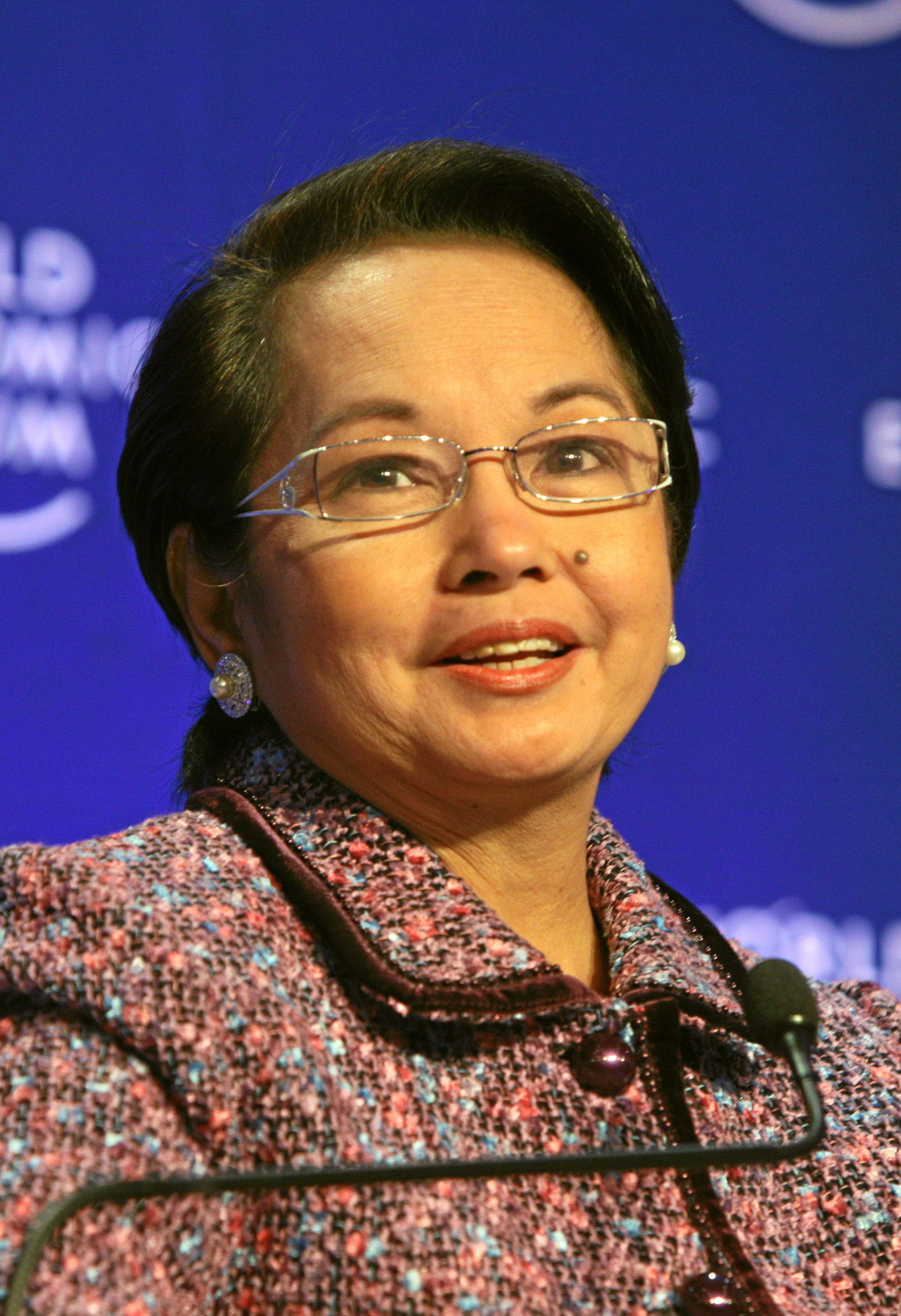
Arroyo at the World Economic Forum meeting in Davos, Switzerland in January 31, 2009

== Post-presidency (2010–present) ==
=== House of Representatives (2010–2019) ===
In November 2009, Arroyo formally declared her intention to run for a seat in the House of Representatives representing the 2nd district of Pampanga, making her the second Philippine president – after Jose P. Laurel – to pursue a lower office after the expiration of their presidency. A petition seeking to disqualify Arroyo from the race was dismissed by the COMELEC for lack of merit, a decision which was later affirmed by the Supreme Court. With little serious competition, she was elected to Congress in May 2010 with a landslide victory. After receiving final military honors at the inauguration ceremony of incoming President Benigno Aquino III, she headed straight to San Fernando, Pampanga for her own oath-taking as congresswoman.

Despite being considered the strongest contender for speaker of the House, Arroyo declined to seek the position, hoping instead to take on a role similar to Sonia Gandhi, who was influential as merely the head of her party. On her first day as a lawmaker, Arroyo and her son Dato filed a resolution calling for Congress to call a constitutional convention to propose amendments to the existing constitution.

While still confined in the Veterans Memorial Medical Center for hospital arrest, Arroyo successfully earned a second term as congresswoman for Pampanga's second congressional district at the conclusion of the 2013 Philippine mid-term elections on May 13, 2013, defeating the ruling Liberal Party's Vivian Dabu, who was the provincial administrator under former Governor Ed Panlilio. She was re-elected in 2016 for her third consecutive term, running unopposed.

==== 2011 spinal surgery ====
In early 2011, Arroyo was diagnosed with cervical spondylosis or cervical radiculopathy. She was rushed to the St. Luke's Medical Center in Taguig on July 25, 2011, minutes after the State of the Nation Address by Benigno Aquino III. Doctors performed a five-hour spine surgery on July 29, 2011. Two more surgeries occurred in August 2011, which aggravated her hypoparathyroidism. The House of Representatives, under the leadership of Speaker Feliciano Belmonte, Jr., issued a travel permit allowing her to have treatment in Germany despite the Department of Justice hold departure order.

==== 2011 hospital arrest ====
Arroyo was arrested on November 18, 2011, after the Pasay Regional Court Branch 112 issued a warrant of arrest against her, following the filing of a complaint for electoral sabotage by the COMELEC. The arrest warrant, signed by Judge Jesus Mupas was served at the St. Luke's Medical Center in Taguig where Arroyo had been confined.

The case was later dismissed in 2018 by the same Pasay court due to the prosecution's failure to prove guilt beyond reasonable doubt. The dismissal, signed by Judge Mupas, cleared Arroyo of the electoral sabotage charges.

Earlier, the Supreme Court had issued a resolution enjoining attempts by the Department of Justice to prevent her departure from the Philippines to seek medical treatment overseas.

She was transferred to the Veterans Memorial Medical Center in Quezon City on December 9, 2011. Arroyo was released from hospital arrest on bail on July 25, 2012.

On October 29, 2012, she refused to enter any plea on charges she misused $8.8 million in state lottery funds during her term in office. As of December 2013, she was still in custody at the Veterans Memorial Medical Center. On July 19, 2016, the Supreme Court dismissed the corruption charges and ordered her release from the hospital where she had been detained since 2011.

==== 2014 medical problems and reapplication for bail ====
Arroyo was transported to St. Luke's Medical Center – Quezon City for tests and treatment and returned to confinement at the Veteran's Medical Center after medical incidents in May and June 2014. In June, after the second of these incidents, her attorneys renewed application for bail. In September, a third medical incident caused her to be again rushed to St. Luke's for treatment and returned to confinement at the Veteran's Medical Center.

==== 2015 United Nations Working Group on Arbitrary Detention ====
In a case filed by human rights lawyer Amal Clooney, the United Nations Working Group on Arbitrary Detention declared Arroyo's hospital detention arbitrary and violative of the international law on human rights. It recognized that the charges against Arroyo were politically motivated since she was detained as a result of her exercise to take part in government and that the detention was arbitrary and illegal under international law because the Sandiganbayan court failed to take into account her individual circumstances when it repeatedly denied her bail.

==== 2016 Supreme Court acquittal ====
On July 19, 2016, the Supreme Court ruled in favor of the dismissal of the plunder case against Arroyo because of insufficient evidence, gathering a vote of 11–4 which was read by spokesperson Theodore Te.

Supreme Court decision on Arroyo's motion to dismiss plunder case
In Favor (11)	Opposed (4)
Presbitero Velasco Jr.; Estela Perlas-Bernabe; Teresita Leonardo-De Castro; Diosdado Peralta; Lucas Bersamin; Mariano del Castillo; Jose P. Perez; Jose C. Mendoza; Bienvenido L. Reyes; Arturo Brion; Francis Jardeleza	Maria Lourdes Sereno; Antonio Carpio; Marvic Leonen; Alfredo Benjamin Caguioa

=== Speaker of the House (2018–2019) ===
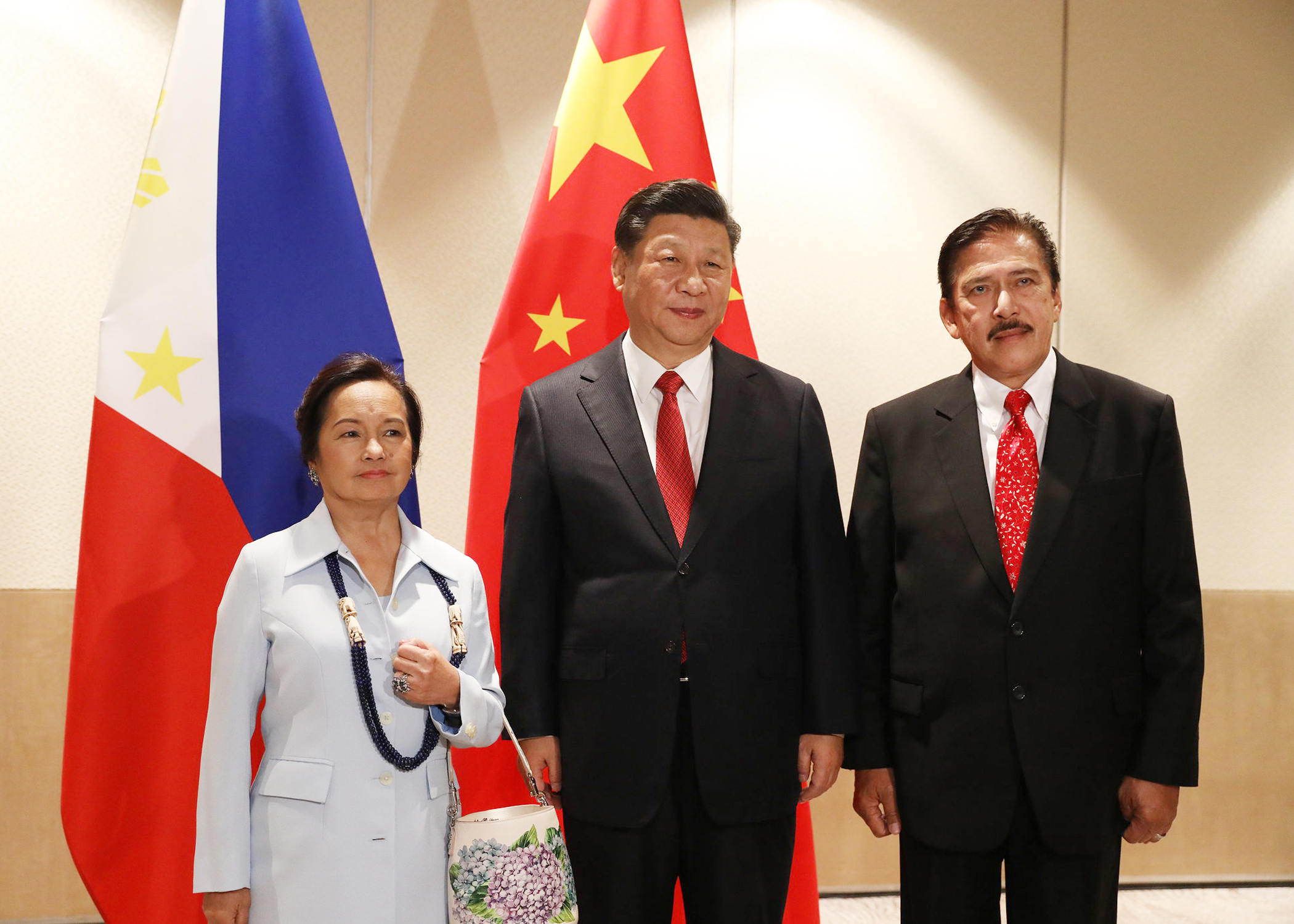
House Speaker Arroyo, Chinese President Xi Jinping (center), and Senate President Tito Sotto during a joint call of the Philippine Senate and House of Representatives on November 21, 2018

Arroyo was elected as the first female speaker of the House of Representatives of the Philippines. The election pushed through on July 23, 2018, due to a controversial majority manifesto and vote that ousted Pantaleon Alvarez. In August 2018, amid rumors that she was gunning to become prime minister under a proposed federal government, which she was advocating in the House, Arroyo stated that she will retire from politics and would not pursue any position after the May 2019 elections.

In January 2019, her speakership passed a House bill which lowered the criminal liability to twelve years old. She had a net satisfaction rating of −4 in September 2018, which further dropped to −21 in January 2019, becoming one of the most unpopular House speakers in Philippine history. Her leadership also spearheaded the changing of House rules in relation to Statements of Assets, Liabilities, and Net Worth (SALNs), requiring a ₱300 fee for access, which amounts to ₱87,300 for the SALNs of all 291 members of the House of Representatives, making it difficult for the poor to monitor corruption in the House.

In February 2019, Senator Panfilo Lacson accused Arroyo of adding an additional pork barrel of ₱60–160 million in the national budget.

=== Political retirement ===
Arroyo, although not holding any elective position, has been participating as a member of Lakas–CMD. As of June 2019, she is working on a memoir narrating her experiences as president, which she plans on limiting to 200 pages for consumption by the general public.

On November 26, 2020, President Rodrigo Duterte appointed Arroyo as presidential adviser on Clark programs and projects.

=== House of Representatives (2022–present) ===
Arroyo came out of retirement to seek a comeback to the House of Representatives in 2022, running unopposed for the 2nd district of Pampanga. Her legal counsel, Peter Paul Magalang, filed the certificate of candidacy on her behalf. She has declared support to the candidacies of Bongbong Marcos for president and new Lakas party-mate Sara Duterte for vice president. She also joined the caravans and campaign sorties of their UniTeam alliance.

On May 10, 2022, Arroyo was proclaimed as representative of the 2nd district of Pampanga, succeeding her son Mikey once again for a fourth nonconsecutive term. Although she assumed office on June 30, 2022, she took her oath of office on May 26 in Lubao and on June 13 before outgoing President Rodrigo Duterte at the Malacañang Palace. Arroyo said she will join her fellow representatives in passing the legislative agenda of the administration of President Bongbong Marcos and will continue to push for projects aligned with the Pampanga Megalopolis program. She initially aimed to regain the House speakership in the 19th Congress, soon after Marcos was elected, but later rescinded after realizing that Marcos wanted his cousin and her Lakas partymate, Rep. Martin Romualdez (Leyte–1st), to become the next House Speaker. She instead endorsed the speakership bid of Romualdez.

On July 25, 2022, Arroyo was named as Senior Deputy Speaker of the House of Representatives under the new speakership of Martin Romualdez in the 19th Congress.

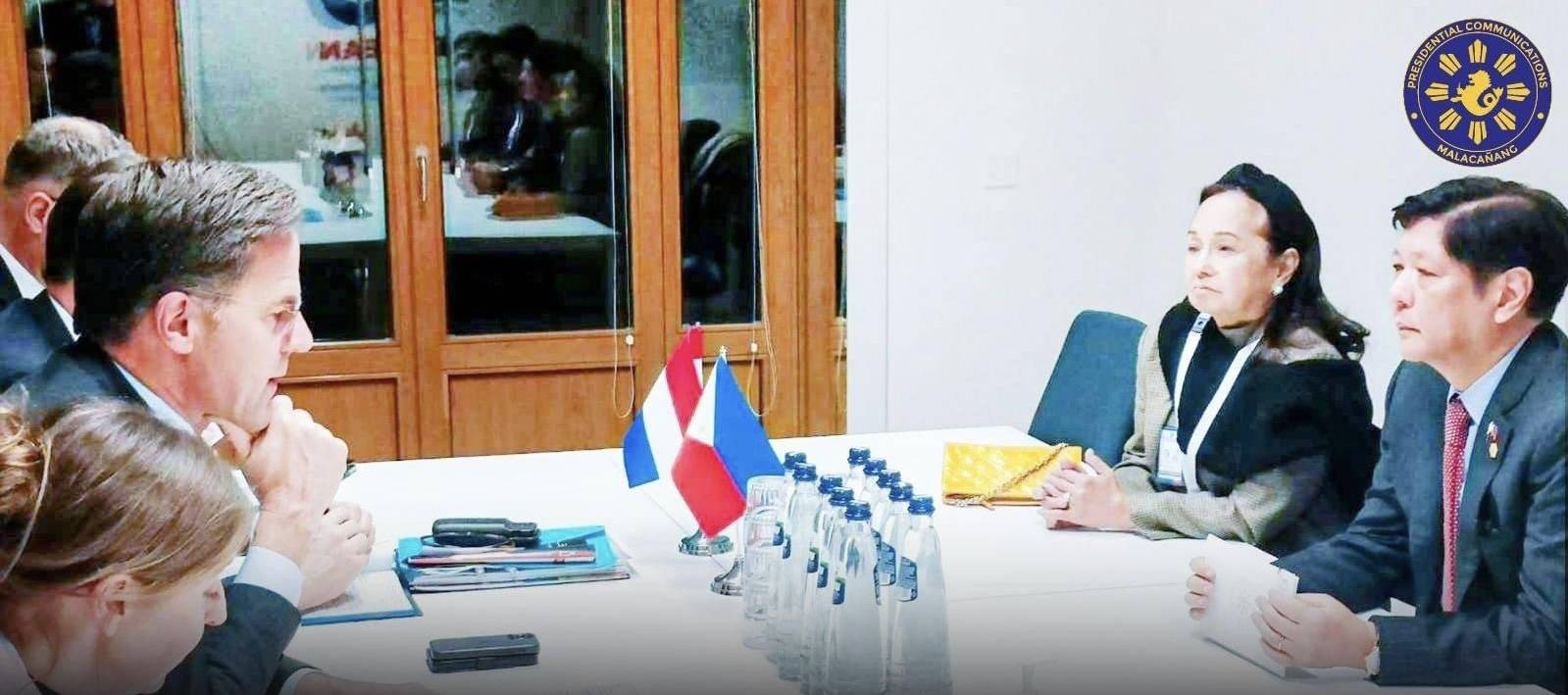
Dutch Prime Minister Mark Rutte (left), Philippine President Bongbong Marcos (right), and Arroyo (second from right) during a bilateral meeting in Brussels in December 2022

Arroyo became part of President Bongbong Marcos's delegation member of his international trips beginning on his working visit to Thailand in November 2022 for the 2022 Asia-Pacific Economic Cooperation summit. She has also joined him in his visits to Belgium, China, Davos in Switzerland, Japan, the United States, and Indonesia. Marcos also described her as his "secret weapon."

Her only daughter, Evangelina Lourdes Arroyo-Bernas, was made the country's ambassador to Austria in December 2022. She defended accusations of nepotism noting her daughter's qualifications.

On May 17, 2023, she was demoted by the House leadership from senior deputy speaker to a regular deputy speaker to unburden her heavy workload that came with the title. She switched places with fellow Pampanga Representative Aurelio Gonzales Jr. of the 3rd district. Later on November 7, 2023, she was expelled by the House from her position as a deputy house speaker, after she failed to support a resolution that aimed to uphold the House's "dignity, integrity and independence" and to support the speakership of Martin Romualdez, as she was abroad when it was signed. This followed the criticism from her political ally, former President Rodrigo Duterte, who objected the House's decision to reallocate the confidential funds originally for the offices of his daughter, Vice President and concurrent Education Secretary Sara Duterte. Arroyo was replaced by Representative Tonypet Albano (Isabela–1st).

Arroyo ran unopposed for re-election as Pampanga's 2nd district representative in 2025 and eventually won.

== Personal life ==
In 1968, Arroyo married lawyer and businessman Jose Miguel Arroyo of Binalbagan, Negros Occidental. They have three children: including Juan Miguel (born 1969), and Diosdado Ignacio Jose Maria (born 1974).

== Approval ratings ==
In July 2008, the Social Weather Stations (SWS) said that Arroyo registered a net satisfaction rating of minus 38 in a survey conducted in the last week of June, making her the most unpopular president in the country since democracy was restored in 1986.

SWS Net satisfaction ratings of Gloria Macapagal-Arroyo (March 2001–June 2010)
Date	Rating
Mar 2001	+24
Apr 2001	+17
May 2001	+18
Jul 2001	+16
Sep 2001	+15
Nov 2001	+27
Mar 2002	+16
May 2002	+4
Aug 2002	+28
Sep 2002	+18
Nov 2002	+6
Mar 2003	−14
Jun 2003	+14
Sep 2003	+2
Nov 2003	−3
Jan 2004	+8
Feb 2004	+15
Mar 2004	+30
Jun 2004	+26
Aug 2004	+12
Oct 2004	−6
Dec 2004	−5
Mar 2005	−12
May 2005	−33
Aug 2005	−23
Dec 2005	−30
Mar 2006	−25
Jun 2006	−13
Sep 2006	−11
Nov 2006	−13
Feb 2007	−4
Jun 2007	−3
Sep 2007	−11
Dec 2007	−16
Mar 2008	−26
Jun 2008	−38
Jul 2008	−50
Sep 2008	−27
Dec 2008	−24
Feb 2009	−32
Jun 2009	−34
Sep 2009	−38
Dec 2009	−38
Mar 2010	−53
Jun 2010	−17
Average	−7

== Honors and awards ==
=== Foreign honors ===
- Brunei:
  - Member of the Family Order of Laila Utama
- Dominican Republic:
  - Grand Cross Special Class of the Order of Merit of Duarte, Sánchez and Mella
- Equatorial Guinea:
  - Grand Cross of the Order of Independence
- Holy See:
  - Recipient of the Pro Ecclesia et Pontifice
- Japan:
  - Grand Cordon of the Order of the Chrysanthemum
- Romania:
  - Collar of the Order of the Star of Romania
- Spain:
  - Dame of the Collar of the Order of Isabella the Catholic

=== Honorary degrees ===
- Honorary Doctor of Laws degree from La Trobe University in Australia (2000)
- Honorary Doctor of Laws degree from Waseda University in Tokyo, Japan (2002)
- Honorary Doctor of Laws degree from Old Dominion University in Virginia, United States (2003)
- Honorary Doctor of Laws degree from Fordham University (2003)
- Honorary Doctor of Humane Letters degree from University of San Francisco in California, United States (2004)
- Honorary Doctor of Humanities degree from Mapua Institute of Technology in Manila, Philippines (2004)
- Honorary Doctor of Laws degree from Kyungsung University in Pusan, South Korea (2005)
- Honorary Doctor of Laws degree from Chulalongkorn University in Bangkok, Thailand

=== Recognitions ===
- Time magazine's "People Who Mattered" list for 2005
- Forbes magazine's 100 Most Powerful Woman in the World (from 2004 to 2009) – she ranked 4th in the 2005 list
- Member, Council of Women World Leaders
- Don Quijote International Award (category: mejor labor institucional – Best institutional work) from Spain's King Juan Carlos (April 15, 2010)
- Teodora Alonzo Award by the Philippine Order of the Knights of Rizal
- Fourth Patron of the Royal Institution Singapore, an unaccredited institution of higher learning

== Electoral history ==
Electoral history of Gloria Macapagal Arroyo
Year	Office	Party	Votes received				Result
Year	Office	Party	Total	%	P.	Swing	Result
1992	Senator of the Philippines	LDP	5,858,950	24.16%	13th	—N/a	Won
1995	Senator of the Philippines	LDP	15,745,741	61.18%	1st	+37.02	Won
1998	Vice President of the Philippines	Lakas	12,667,252	49.56%	1st	—N/a	Won
2004	President of the Philippines	Lakas	12,905,808	39.99%	1st	—N/a	Won
2010	Representative (Pampanga–2nd)	Lakas–Kampi	169,109	84.23%	1st	—N/a	Won
2013	Representative (Pampanga–2nd)	Lakas	149,344	78.24%	1st	-5.99	Won
2016	Representative (Pampanga–2nd)	Lakas	190,631	100%	1st	+21.76	Unopposed
2022	Representative (Pampanga–2nd)	Lakas	233,042	100%	1st	0.00	Unopposed
2025	Representative (Pampanga–2nd)	Lakas	227,254	100%	1st	0.00	Unopposed

== Notes ==
Political offices
Preceded by Joseph Estrada	Vice President of the Philippines; 1998–2001	Succeeded by Teofisto Guingona
Preceded by Joseph Estrada	President of the Philippines; 2001–2010	Succeeded by Benigno Aquino III
Preceded by Teofisto Guingona	Secretary of Foreign Affairs; Acting; 2002	Succeeded by Blas Ople
Preceded by Angelo Reyes	Secretary of National Defense; Acting; 2003	Succeeded by Eduardo Ermita
Preceded by Franklin Ebdalin; Acting	Secretary of Foreign Affairs; Acting; 2003	Succeeded by Delia Albert
Preceded by Avelino Cruz	Secretary of National Defense; Acting; 2006–2007	Succeeded by Hermogenes Ebdane
Party political offices
Preceded by Emilio Osmeña	Lakas-NUCD-UMDP nominee for Vice President of the Philippines; 1998	Vacant Supported Noli de Castro (Independent)
Preceded by Jose de Venecia Jr.	Lakas-CMD nominee for President of the Philippines; 2004	Succeeded by Gilbert Teodoro
Preceded by Jose de Venecia Jr.	Leader of Lakas-CMD; 2004–2009	Parties merged
Preceded by Luis Villafuerte	Leader emeritus of Kampi; 2004–2009	Parties merged
New political party	Leader of Lakas Kampi CMD; 2009	Succeeded by Gilbert Teodoro
Preceded by Amelita Villarosa; Acting	Leader of Lakas Kampi CMD; 2010–2011	Succeeded by Edcel Lagman
Diplomatic posts
Preceded by Abdullah Ahmad Badawi	Chairperson of the ASEAN; 2007	Succeeded by Lee Hsien Loong
House of Representatives of the Philippines
Preceded by Mikey Arroyo	Member of the Philippine House of Representatives from Pampanga's 2nd district 2010–2019	Succeeded by Mikey Arroyo
Preceded by Roberto Puno	Deputy Speaker of the Philippine House of Representatives; 2016–2017	Succeeded by Linabelle Villarica
Preceded by Pantaleon Alvarez	Speaker of the House of Representatives of the Philippines; 2018–2019	Succeeded by Alan Peter Cayetano
Preceded by Mikey Arroyo	Member of the Philippine House of Representatives from Pampanga's 2nd district 2022–present	Incumbent
Order of precedence
Preceded by Joseph Estrada as Former President	Order of Precedence of the Philippines (Ceremonial) as Former President	Succeeded by Rodrigo Duterte as Former President
