= St. Luke's Medical Center (company) =

Hospital network based in Quezon City, Philippines

St. Luke's Medical Center, Inc.
- Type: Non-profit
- Industry: Health care
- Founded: 1975; 51 years ago
- Founder: Charles Henry Brent
- Headquarters: St. Luke's Medical Center – Quezon City, Philippines
- Number of locations: 2 hospitals (2010)
- Key people: Frederick Dy (Chairman); Dennis P Serrano (President and CEO)
- Subsidiaries: St. Luke's Medical Center (Global City), Inc.
- Website: www.stlukes.com.ph

The St. Luke's Medical Center (SLMC) is a private, non-profit healthcare institution based in Quezon City, Metro Manila, Philippines which operates two hospitals of the same name in Quezon City and Taguig.

The first health facility of the St. Luke's Medical Center was established in Tondo, Manila in 1903 by the American Protestant Episcopalian missionaries, which later moved to Quezon City in 1961. The second hospital would be inaugurated in Taguig in 2010.

The hospital established the St. Luke's College of Nursing in 1907 which is now under the Trinity University of Asia, its affiliated university.

St. Luke's is affiliated with the Episcopal Church in the Philippines and maintains ties with the Protestant Episcopal Church in the United States of America.

== History ==
St. Luke's was established in October 1903 by American Protestant Episcopalian missionaries as a charity ward and dispensary hospital led by retired bishop Charles Henry Brent. St. Luke's started out as the Dispensary of St. Luke the Beloved Physician, a fully free outpatient clinic for the poor in Calle Magdalena (now Masangkay Street) in Tondo, Manila. It also supports and conducts medical, dental and surgical missions in rural areas.

The 30-bed University Hospital would be inaugurated on October 23, 1907. The bed capacity was increased to 52 three years later.

In 1912, the University Hospital would be renamed as St. Luke's Hospital to distinguish it from the University of the Philippines Hospital.

The health facility would move to Quezon City in 1961.

It was transformed into an independent, non-sectarian, non-stock, non-profit corporation in the 1975.

St. Luke's Medical Center would open its second hospital at the Bonifacio Global City in Taguig in 2010.

== Facilities and affiliates ==
=== Hospitals ===
St. Luke's Medical Center Inc. maintains two hospitals, one in Quezon City and another at the Bonifacio Global City in Taguig. SLMC is based in the Quezon City Hospital while the Taguig hospital is a wholly owned corporation of the Quezon City-based SLMC.

Hospital	Image	Bed capacity	Location	Status
St. Luke's Hospital (University Hospital)		52	Tondo, Manila	Defunct
St. Luke's Medical Center – Quezon City			Quezon City	Active
St. Luke's Medical Center – Global City		600	Bonifacio Global City, Taguig	Active

=== Extension clinic ===
There is also an extension clinic located in Ermita, Manila. The extension clinic caters primarily to those patients seeking medical examination requirements for Visa application for US, Australia, Canada, and New Zealand.

=== Foundation ===
The St. Luke’s Medical Center Foundation Inc. serves as the charity arm of the SLMC. It was established in August 28, 2012.
