= St. Luke's Medical Center – Quezon City =

Private hospital in Quezon City, Philippines

- St. Luke's Medical Center, Inc.

Geography
- Location: 279 E. Rodriguez Sr. Ave., Barangay Kalusugan, Quezon City, Metro Manila, Philippines
- Coordinates: 14°37′22″N 121°01′24″E

Organization
- Affiliated university: St. Luke's College of Medicine; Trinity University of Asia

Services
- Beds: 650

History
- Founded: 1903; 123 years ago (in Manila); 1961; 65 years ago (current hospital in Quezon City)

Links
- Website: www.stlukes.com.ph

St. Luke's Medical Center – Quezon City is a hospital in Quezon City, Metro Manila, Philippines. It is a part of St. Luke's Medical Center group of hospitals. Founded in 1903 by the American Protestant Episcopalian missionaries, it is the third American and Protestant hospital in the Philippines (first Protestant Episcopalian hospital in the country) after CPU–Iloilo Mission Hospital and Silliman University Medical Center.

Along with its sister medical center of the same name, the St. Luke's Medical Center - Global City at the Bonifacio Global City (BGC) in Taguig, the hospital is under the management of the St. Luke's Medical Center Group and is affiliated with the Episcopal Church in the Philippines, but maintains to be independent.

The managing entity of both hospitals is based in the Quezon City hospital and the BGC hospital is a wholly owned corporation of the former.

St. Luke's serves also as an affiliated university hospital of Trinity University of Asia, the first Protestant Episcopalian university in Asia, and the St. Luke's College of Medicine.

== History ==
St. Luke's was established in October 1903 by American Episcopalian missionaries as a charity ward and dispensary hospital led by retired bishop Charles Henry Brent. It was founded as the Dispensary of St. Luke the Beloved Physician, a fully free outpatient clinic for the poor in Calle Magdalena (now Masangkay Street) in Tondo, Manila.

In 1961, the health facility would move to its current location in Quezon City.

== Facilities ==
Medical Arts Building

The hospital has a 633 bed-capacity. It also hosts medical equipment such as the 3-Tesla MRI, 1152-slice dual energy CT scanner, PET scanner and Cyclotron. It employs at least 1,700 doctors and about 2,600 non-medical staff.

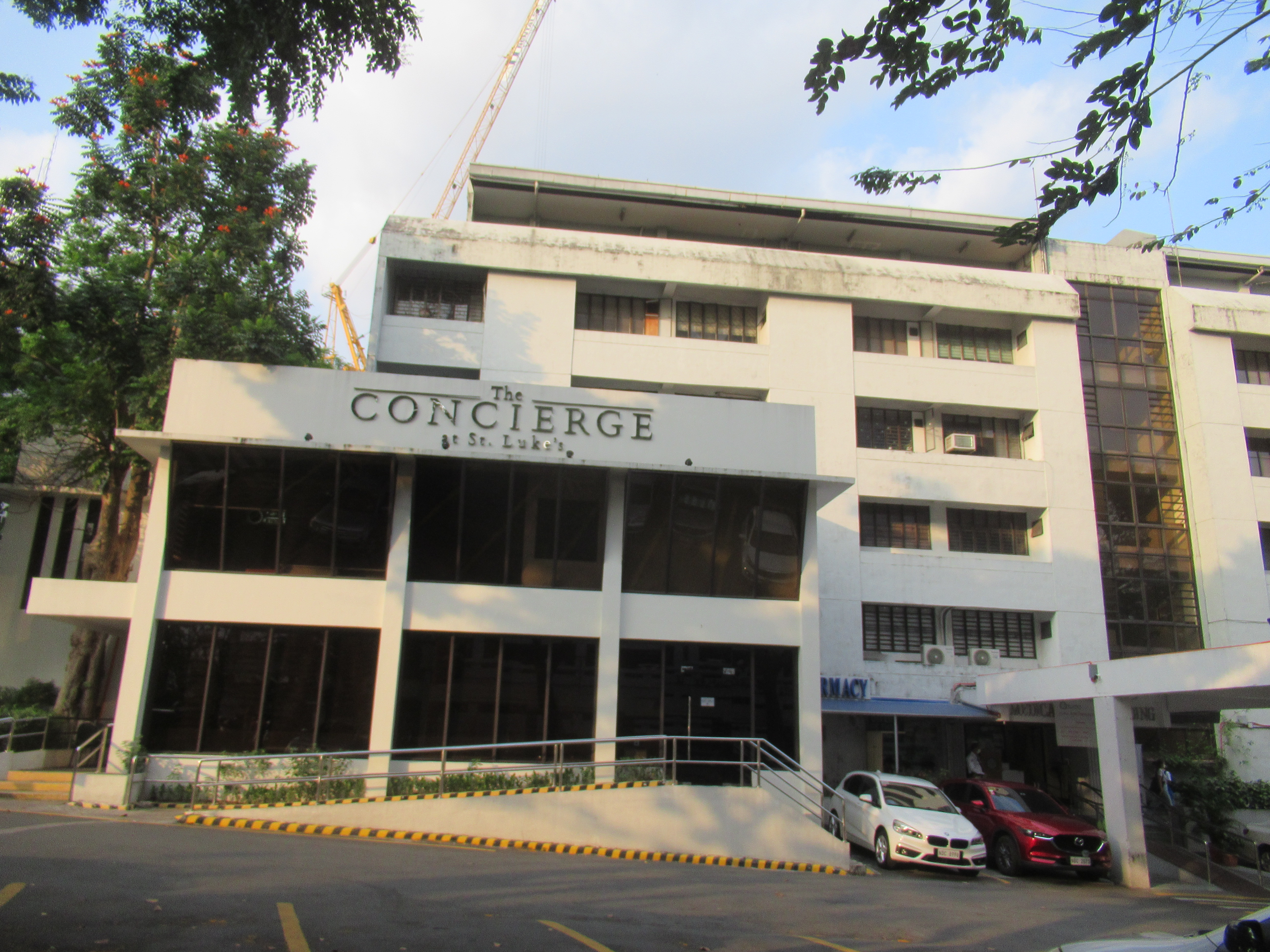
The Concierge

== Reception ==
The St. Luke's Medical Center – Quezon City is the first hospital in the Philippines and the second one in Asia to be accredited by the Joint Commission International. The hospital first earned the distinction in 2003 and the accreditation has been renewed at least four times

In 2013, German based accreditation organization, TEMOS gave an Excellence in Medical Tourism and Quality in International Patient Care certificate to the hospital in Quezon City. Its sister facility in Bonifacio Global City was also given the award.
