= St. Luke's College of Nursing, Trinity University of Asia =

Nursing school in Quezon City, Philippines

St. Luke's College of Nursing or SLCN (formerly, St. Luke's Hospital School of Nursing) is one of the educational units of Trinity University of Asia. It started operating under Trinity College of Quezon City in 1965 when its first class was admitted. The decision to establish the College of Nursing, however, was made as early as March 13, 1964 when at a meeting of the St. Luke's Hospital School of Nursing Board of Trustees, it was decided that steps be taken by the school to become a collegiate program. By that time, the former Capitol City College has already been bought by the Bishop of the Philippines, Philippine Episcopal Church, as Corporate Sole and renamed Trinity College of Quezon City.

Three of the first batch of St. Luke's Hospital School of Nursing

The St. Luke’s Hospital School of Nursing, the predecessor of St. Luke's College of Nursing, was established in 1907 soon after the founding of St. Luke’s Hospital (now the St. Luke's Medical Center). The Rev. Charles Brent, the first Bishop of the Episcopal Church in the Philippines saw the need for Filipino nurse initiated the school’s establishment together with Miss Ellen T. Hicks, then the first superintendent of nurses. The school had three of the seventeen Filipino women who first took nursing in the Philippines.

Courses offered:

- Doctor in Nursing Management
- Master of Arts in Nursing
- Bachelor of Science in Nursing

== Notable alumni ==
- Vitaliana G. Beltran, R.N. (Class 1917) - First Filipina Superintendent of Nurses who served St. Luke's Hospital for more than forty years. She also pioneered the organization of the Filipino Nurses Association in 1922 now known as the Philippine Nurses' Association (PNA).
- Leah Primitiva Goco Samaco-Paquiz, Ed.D., R.N. (Class 1973) - National President of the Philippine Nurses Association (2007)
- Ruth Raña-Padilla, R.N. (Class 1975) - 2007 Commissioner of the Professional Regulation Commission, Philippine Nurses Association Governor for Region II.
- Maria Angelica Rosedell Amante, R.N. (Class 1991) - Governor (1995–2004) and Congressional Representative (2004–2007) of Agusan del Norte, Philippines.
- Maria Kristelle M. Lazaro, R.N. (Class 2007) - Miss Philippines-Earth Fire 2008 winner.

Principals / Deans of St. Luke's Hospital School of Nursing and Trinity University of Asia - St. Luke's College of Nursing

- Ellen Hicks (1907–1917)
- Deaconess Charlotte Massey (1917–1921)
- Eliza Davis (1921–1923)
- Lillian Weiser (1923–1941)
- Vitaliana G. Beltran (1941–1945)
- Emelda Tinawin Jones (1945–1946)
- Asuncion Parrenas Koenig (1946–1949)
- Mary Vita Beltran Jackson (1949–1953)
- Herminia Reyes (1953–1954)
- Ester Abellera Santos (1954–1962)
- Josefina Cortez Carreon (1962–1966)
- Ester Abellera Santos (1966–1985)
- Fe E. Alcantara (1985–1994)
- Leah Primitiva G. Samaco-Paquiz (1994–2003)
- Ester Lopez Dimanlig (2003–2005)
- Gisela de Asas Luna (2005–2017)
- John Michael Olea Lorena (present)
