= Virgilio Garcillano =

Filipino civil servant (1937–2025)

Commissioner of the Commission on Elections
- In office February 12, 2004 – June 10, 2005
- Appointed by: Gloria Macapagal Arroyo

Personal details
- Born: Virgilio Olivar Garcillano; July 5, 1937
- Died: March 29, 2025 (aged 87) Imbatug, Baungon, Bukidnon
- Resting place: Oro Garden, Cagayan De Oro
- Party: Independent
- Education: University of the East (BA, LL.B.)
- Profession: Lawyer, public Servant, politician

Virgilio Olivar Garcillano (July 5, 1937 – March 29, 2025), also known as Garci, (Note: Garcillano's nickname was "Gil". However, due to the Hello Garci controversy, he even used "Garci" instead of his nickname in his 2007 election campaign.) was a long-time official of the Philippine Commission on Elections (Comelec), serving as a commissioner during the presidency of Gloria Macapagal Arroyo.

Garcillano was known for his alleged involvement in electoral fraud throughout his career, particularly the Hello Garci scandal which revealed taped conversations between him and the president following the 2004 elections.

== Early life and education ==
Garcillano was born on July 5, 1937. He was a 1960 law graduate from the University of the East. Garcillano obtained trainings—platoon leaders course from the Philippine Army School Command, and career executive development program from the Development Academy of the Philippines.

== Career in the Comelec ==
Garcillano spent his career at the Commission on Elections (Comelec) beginning in 1961, when he first worked as a special attorney. Among those had been known as the "master operator" of the commission, he engaged in election fraud during the Marcos presidency, the reason he was among those relieved following the revamp after the 1986 People Power Revolution, but among those few who were reinstated—in 1993. He eventually became the regional director in Southern Luzon and in Northern Mindanao until his retirement in 2002.

Despite this, in February 2004, Garcillano and Philippine Postal Corporation president Manuel Barcelona Jr. were appointed by President Gloria Macapagal Arroyo as Comelec commissioners, ad interim; replacing Ralph Lantion and Luzviminda Tancangco whose terms had expired, and becoming the fourth and fifth Arroyo-appointed officials of the seven-member commission. At that time, the Congress—where some of its members composes the Commission on Appointments (CA)—had been on recess for the May elections. Garcillano was first tasked by chairperson Benjamin Abalos to supervise the Autonomous Region in Muslim Mindanao (ARMM) and other parts of Mindanao in the elections, but was transferred to the Southern Tagalog and Bicol regions following allegations of his involvement in past election irregularities.

However in 2005, at the time there had been news reports on what would be called the "Hello Garci" scandal where Garcillano was implicated, their appointments lapsed on June 10 after they were bypassed by the CA; no further re-appointments were issued. Moreover, there were reports that Garcillano resigned and had left the Comelec by said date.

=== Opposition to his appointment ===
Garcillano's appointment was opposed by some senators, including its president Franklin Drilon. Sen. Edgardo Angara called both appointments unconstitutional; meanwhile, election lawyer Romulo Macalintal said that the two can actually legally assume office pending confirmation by the CA, citing a 2002 court case.

The oppositionist Koalisyon ng Nagkakaisang Pilipino (KNP), suspecting the administration was attempting to prevent the victory of the coalition's then presidential candidate, movie actor Fernando Poe Jr.—also an Arroyo's opponent, likewise sought the recall of the two. Since the start of their terms, the two, along with another commissioner Florentino Tuason, supported a petition seeking Poe's disqualification on citizenship grounds. The petition was rejected both by the Comelec and later by the Supreme Court, upholding the candidacy of Poe who was declared a natural-born Filipino.

== Controversies ==
=== Prior allegations ===
Following the appointment of Garcillano and Barcelona, both career election officials, as Comelec commissioners, their notoriety for manipulation of votes, particularly in Mindanao, was raised.

Garcillano was accused by then re-electionst Sen. Nene Pimentel of the KNP, of electoral fraud that resulted to his loss in the 1995 senatorial election. Among those allegations were the registration of fake voters in Northern Mindanao which he denied; as well as his involvement in dagdag-bawas (vote padding and shaving) operations and in the distribution of cash to Comelec officials from the ARMM in previous elections, particularly the turnover of ₱1.5 million in a hotel in Cagayan de Oro sometime. Pimentel, in a letter to Drilon and Angara, asked for an inquiry to investigate the two appointees for alleged ties with the First Gentleman.

=== Hello Garci case ===
Garcillano became one of the subjects of the so-called "Hello Garci scandal", a case involving allegations of electoral fraud which led to the presidential victory of Arroyo in the 2004 elections. Arroyo had defeated popular actor Poe. This revealed the alleged complicity of Comelec, military and Malacañang officials.

The controversy stemmed from a 2005 exposé of the wiretapped phone conversation allegedly between Arroyo—an incumbent seeking a six-year term, and Garcillano—then COMELEC vice chair for personnel, wherein the latter was instructed to ensure her at least a million vote margin by manipulating the results in Mindanao. At that time that was taped, the Intelligence Service of the Armed Forces of the Philippines had been monitoring election-related conversations; and that was reportedly leaked by disgruntled ISAFP officers to the opposition.

Despite the accusations, Arroyo, in an address, admitted to such conversations while monitoring her votes; but denied that the voice on the leaked tapes was hers, and giving such order to Garcillano; and later publicly apologized. Meanwhile, at the height of the controversy, Garcillano reportedly secretly left the country and was seen overseas; but reappeared later that year in a joint congressional hearing. He later went into hiding in Malaybalay, Bukidnon, for over a month until his appearance in December 2006 somewhere in Maguindanao.

In a 2005 hearing, and since his first media interview in Bukidnon after the controversy, Garcillano admitted talking about the election tally, but denied the manipulation. He maintained being a victim in the controversy, claiming there was "no such thing as Hello Garci" because the president used to call him either "Comm" or "Commissioner;" and the tapes, which he later described as "baloney," were fabricated by his critics. Shortly after the end of the Arroyo presidency in 2010, in an interview with GMA's 24 Oras at his farm, he added that he regretted joining the Comelec due to the scandal.

The scandal remained both one of the largest in the Arroyo administration, and one of those unresolved. Those involved, including Garcillano, were never charged as the five-year prescription period for the filing of cases lapsed. Comelec employees were even promoted within that period.

=== Perjury case ===
In March 2014, the Ombudsman indicted Garcillano of perjury, referring to his statements in a 2005 congressional hearing denying trying to evade the inquiry and going overseas. It was found that Garcillano presented counterfeit passport, and went to London through Changi Airport in Singapore.

== Attempt in politics ==
In 2007, Garcillano ran as an independent for congressman of the first district of Bukidnon, but later conceded defeat while arguing being "defeated by black propaganda." He eventually placed third.

== Personal life and death ==
Garcillano lived privately in Bukidnon since his failed congressional bid, mostly in his farmhouse, which also served as his retirement home, in Baungon. In mid-July 2011, TV5 reported that Garcillano was no longer in his Baungon farmhouse, but had moved to another location but "still in the foothills of Mount Kitanglad".

On September 12, 2007, Garcillano was treated at the Chinese General Hospital and Medical Center in Santa Cruz, Manila after a biopsy due to prostate disease.

Garcillano was married to Grace. He died at his residence in Baungon, on March 29, 2025, at the age of 87.

== See also ==
- Samuel Ong
