= Hello Garci scandal =

2005 Philippine vote-rigging scandal

The Hello Garci scandal (or just Hello Garci), also known as Gloriagate, was a political scandal and electoral crisis in the Philippines involving 14th president Gloria Macapagal Arroyo, who allegedly rigged the 2004 national election in her favor. The official results of the election gave Arroyo and Noli de Castro the presidency and vice-presidency respectively. Hundreds of national and local positions were also contested during this election. The scandal and crisis began in June 2005 when audio recordings of a phone call conversation between President Arroyo and then-Election Commissioner Virgilio Garcillano, allegedly talking about the rigging of the 2004 national election results, were released to the public. This escalated when the minority of the lower house of Congress attempted to impeach Arroyo. This was blocked by the Arroyo-led majority coalition in September 2005 and no trial took place.

Allegations against Arroyo and her alleged accomplices in government were many, including electoral fraud and its supposed cover-up. The Arroyo administration denied some of the allegations and challenged others in court. The House of Representatives, which was dominated by Arroyo's coalition, blocked attempts for an impeachment trial. Arroyo's most publicized alleged accomplice from the electoral commission, Virgilio Garcillano, was missing for a few months, but returned to the capital in late 2005. Allegations persist regarding possible conspirators from the government who helped in his escape, and another alleged cover-up. Garcillano denied any wrongdoing, before his disappearance, and after his return. In December 2006, Garcillano was cleared of perjury charges by the Department of Justice.

== Events history ==
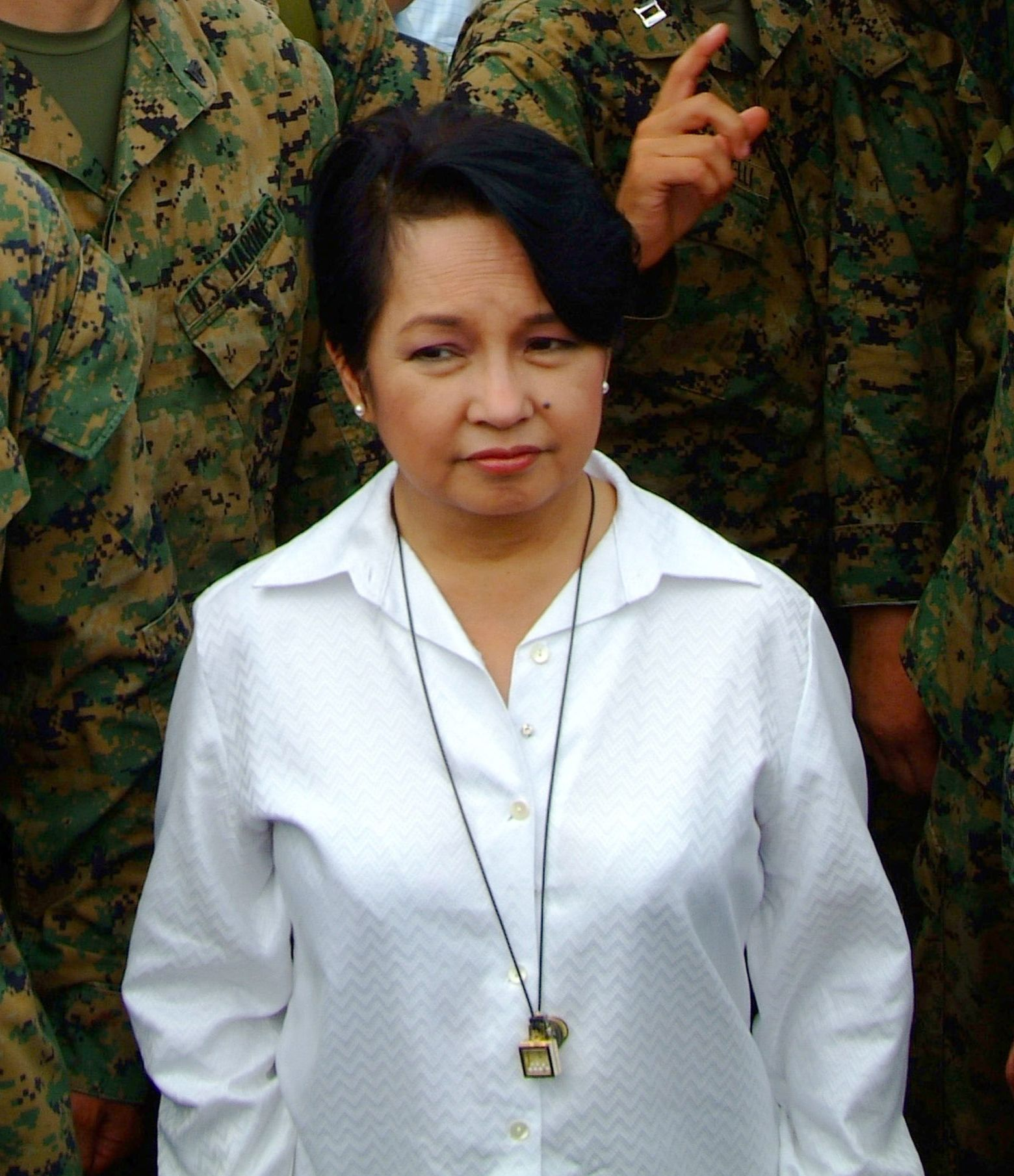
President Gloria Macapagal Arroyo

Samuel Ong, a former deputy director of the country's National Bureau of Investigation (NBI), declared in a June 10, 2005, press conference that he possessed original recordings of a wiretapped conversation between Arroyo and an official of the Commission on Elections, who was alleged to be Virgilio Garcillano. In the following weeks, the media analyzed contents of the tapes. The Ong recordings allegedly proved that Arroyo rigged the 2004 national election to maintain her presidency and the political success of her allies. Arroyo denied the accusations of election rigging in a television broadcast on June 27, but acknowledged that it was her voice on the tape. Protests occurred frequently during the crisis either in favor or against Arroyo and her administration. Attempts to impeach Arroyo failed on September 6.

The scandal sparked three separate impeachment complaints during the 13th Congress. The first impeachment complaint came from Attorney Oliver Lozano alleged that then-President Arroyo's admission that the voice in the Ong recording was hers was sufficient basis to impeach her for betrayal of public trust and in subsequent supplemental affidavits alleged that her contact with a COMELEC official was punishable after the proclamation of the election in contest. Additional affidavits also allege that her signing of the E-VAT constituted a betrayal of public trust, that her failure to order the National Bureau of Investigation, Philippine National Police, and Armed Forces of the Philippines constituted additional evidence for impeachment. A second impeachment complaint was filed by Attorney Jose Rizaldo Lopez supplementing the Lozano complaint while stating that only impeachment can address the stock market, peso exchange market, President Arroyo's ratings, fuel price hikes, and playing of alleged wiretapped conversations at the House of Representatives. A third impeachment complaint was also filed by Oliver Lozano as an amendment to his earlier complaint. The third complaint alleged her of violations of the Constitution and betrayal of public trust. The latter was allegedly caused by obstruction of justice, failure to publicly disclose business interests, and killings of political dissenters. Additionally it also accused her of graft, bribery, and corruption from projects that were unfair to the Government and alleged bribery of officials to certify Arroyo's win.

== Public opinion ==
During the scandal, polls and surveys conducted by Social Weather Stations, CNN/Time, and Pulse Asia measured public opinion regarding the allegations and other related issues.

According to a CNN/Time poll, 57.5% of the people surveyed said that Philippine President Macapagal-Arroyo should not finish her term. A Pulse Asia survey released on Philippine news on July 12 showed that 57% of the people wanted incumbent President Arroyo to resign from office.

On January 25, 2008, Pulse Asia survey (commissioned by Genuine Opposition (GO) per former Senator Sergio Osmeña III) stated that 58% percent of Filipinos in Mindanao believed that President Arroyo cheated in the 2004 Philippine general election. 70% "believed that because of recurring allegations of election fraud, the credibility of the balloting process in Mindanao was at a record low."

== Evidence ==
=== Ong recordings ===
Two recordings were presented to the public: the Ong recordings and the government endorsed version of the recordings. Uncut copies of the Ong recordings managed to become widespread. The first recordings to be released to the press were used in the Congressional inquiry on the crisis. The second set of recordings, described by the government as the original (SET1A, SET1B, SET1C, SET1D) and spliced (SET2A, SET2B, SET2C, SET2D, SET2E) recordings, was more easily accessible in the Philippines as the government did not restrict the media from airing it. However, the media aired both sets, focusing on the Ong recordings.

One 17-second snippet of the recorded phone conversation that is widely alleged to be between Arroyo and election official Virgilio Garcillano ("Garci") features a woman discussing the election returns; the woman says (translated from Tagalog) "Hello? Hello? Hello Garci? So, will I still lead by more than 1M (million)?"

Shortly after the scandal broke, Randy David, a nonpartisan columnist of the Philippine Daily Inquirer, cited two excerpts from the Ong recording in an article. Sheila Coronel, of the Philippine Center of Investigative Journalism, was able to decipher some of the garbled parts of the tape, which allegedly implicated Arroyo in the scandal. David analyzed the tapes using ethnomethodology and came to the same conclusions as did Coronel. His analysis described one of the speakers as a female coming across as a person speaking to her subordinate. Later, Arroyo acknowledged that it was her voice on the recording (Arroyo's "I'm Sorry" speech, 3.96MB MP3). However, no trial took place regarding Arroyo's intentions with her conversations in the recordings. According to Philippine law, both recordings are part of the public domain and are freely distributable.

In his editorial on June 12, 2005, for the Philippine Daily Inquirer, Randy David said,

"On the surface it does look like an innocent exchange. The key word here is "nagco-correspond" – a gloss that refers to the practice of fixing canvass results at, say, the provincial level so that they are not at variance with precinct election returns or statement of votes for municipalities. The other gloss is the question "Kumpleto?" This is not a harmless inquiry. Given the kind of response it elicits, it is an urgent demand to make sure the doctoring is done with care".

David described Arroyo's subordinate as a "man...not in the business of counting votes; he produces them."

Sheila Coronel described electoral fraud and the involvement of the independent watchdog group Namfrel. In her analysis, Coronel alleged that corruption was clearly evident. She also commented on the garbled portions of the tape, which were digitally enhanced for clarity. Allegedly, Arroyo whispered "Yung dagdag, yung dagdag" ("The addition, the addition"), implying fraud and mentioned Namfrel's sympathy for her. In her blog, she said,

"The conversations, after all, provide damning proof that Garcillano was, in the words of a Comelec official, "the plotter for electoral fraud, the overall supervisor and commander in chief" of the manipulation of the count in favor of the administration. The recording points to systemic and institutional fraud perpetrated by the Comelec. Does this mean that the President, by confirming her phone calls to the commissioner, also provided, albeit indirectly, a virtual confirmation of the fraud?"

=== Other evidence ===
Rashma Hali, an electoral official from Basilan claims that Arroyo is related to a kidnapping operation. Michael Zuce claimed that he was present in an incident where Arroyo allegedly bribed officials from the Commission on Elections. Retired general Francisco Gudani claimed that he can prove military involvement in Arroyo's alleged acts of electoral fraud. Roberto Verzola, leader of the Philippine Greens and an IT expert, claimed that Gloria Macapagal Arroyo cheated and the citizens' election watchdog, National Citizens' Movement for Free Elections (Namfrel) was involved. Jay Carizo, from the Institute for Popular Democracy, developed the election cheating indicators. Other sources claimed fraud in several other government positions, as well as the murder of political opponents by incumbents. There were eyewitness claims as well. Loren Legarda claimed that she had evidence of being cheated by Noli de Castro, who won the vice presidency in 2004.

== Fraud techniques ==
A new fraud technique involves manipulating the election return or ER, which is a summary of the votes in precincts. Evidence exists showing that the 32,000 sets of overprinted ERs of the Commission on Elections could manipulate an election by as much as three million votes. Such number of votes could change a result.

== Effects on popular culture ==
Lines from the Ong tapes became popular cellphone ringtones after they were made public, especially among the youth during the beginning of their school year in June. A ringtone of the Hello Garci greeting quickly became one of the most downloaded ring tones in the world.

The scandal would also be referenced by television personality Joey de Leon during a publicized feud with fellow television personality Willie Revillame surrounding allegations of rigging on ABS-CBN's program Wowowee—Joey jokingly called upon the Department of Trade and Industry to stop probing the Hello Garci scandal, and begin probing "Hello Pappy" instead, in reference to Willie's nickname.

== Issues ==
=== Accountability and legitimacy ===
The evidence carried with it great consequences. The Ong tape were neutrally authenticated by foreign companies Uniquest (Australia) and Voice Identification (United States). Arroyo's spokesman, Ignacio Bunye, as well as the president herself, acknowledged that it was indeed Arroyo's voice. The protesting public insisted that the tapes and CDs proved electoral fraud, and that Arroyo cheated and rigged the 2004 elections. A sizable number of people wanted the results of the 2004 elections to be made invalid. The Supreme Court withheld judgment on the matter, refraining from actions toward invalidating the election. The administration said the Ong recordings were inadmissible in court, since the audio was taped without consent.

Initially, there were two possible outcomes for the government; Arroyo could have either resigned or be ousted through a constitutionally accepted process. These actions could only take place after addressing the current state of the faulty electoral system. The other outcome was for Arroyo to be cleared of any wrongdoing. Neither outcome occurred, and hence no final course of action was taken to resolve Arroyo's legitimacy or to prevent electoral fraud. Those unrealized possible outcomes could have resolved definitely the legitimacy issue, and could have made Arroyo accountable for any wrongdoing. However, Philippine law and the country's flawed electoral rules complicate the legitimacy and accountability problem. The law only mentions impeachment followed with a conviction as a possible way of removing certain serving legitimate government officials. The law however is unclear on how to prosecute and convict the sitting official if illegitimacy is the problem, due to allegations of vote rigging. Conrado de Quiros, a strong advocate of electoral reforms, argues that a special presidential election must be done in coinciding with midterm elections to resolve legitimacy.

"It is not enough that the elections next year [2007 midterm elections] be turned into a referendum on Arroyo, it is imperative that the elections next year be turned into an occasion to vote for a real president."

"At the very least, a loud and universal call for special presidential elections next year will let it be known that we are serious about doing something about screwing the voters. No, more than that, about the deceitfulness and lying that are spreading everywhere in this country faster than karaoke. In the end, none of the safeguards against cheating will matter if there is no public vigilance against the threat and no outrage against the commission."

Whether the special presidential elections occurs or not, a significant number of incumbent politicians who are allied with administration and who were elected during the tainted 2004 elections may be deposed by voter backlash in the upcoming 2007 midterm elections, assuming the election to be free and fair. The electorate would use the upcoming election as a referendum on accountability and legitimacy for Arroyo and her political supporters. All of the seats of Arroyo's supporters in the House of Representatives, half of the Senate, and all local government positions are to be contested. De Quiros also describes this contest as a contest of "democracy vs. the cheaters".

=== Electoral system ===
The Philippines, according to experts, has a reputation for having political issues based on patronage politics and personality politics. To some experts, what is unique about the crisis is that it addresses the greater issue of electoral fraud and an allegedly faulty election system that allows cheaters to win and get away with it. This is manifested in a humorous local saying that, "There are two types of people in elections. Those who win and those who get cheated out of office." Politically outspoken student groups mention that this is rather new for Philippine politics, and shows a gradual development of the voting public, the electorate.

According to pundits, the past 60 years of the Philippine history already has a reputation of electoral fraud, proven or otherwise. It is just that no one ever gets caught or punished. Analysts assert that the people have always been desensitized to their politicians cheating during elections. Accordingly, people generally doubt their leaders' mandates. The people are often suspicious of the winners, especially in close poll results, but do nothing. Constituents generally allow their leaders, assuming proven acts of cheating, to get away with it until the scandal erupted. Roberto Verzola supports punishing candidates guilty of fraud as the first step for electoral reforms. He said that, "the system can be slow or fast but there will still be cheating unless you punish the cheats." l The reforms sought for the electoral system are still clouded with uncertainty.

== Media coverage and response ==
Critics alleged that some media groups in broadcast and print were partisan in reporting the crisis. Alternative media, mostly in radio, made similar accusations, though some may be partisan themselves. These accusations though between them are not new, and are common during propaganda wars, as politically motivated groups use connections in media to promote their side. During the latter part of the crisis, this changed as the media became generally more critical in delivery, which was beneficial for properly informing viewers about the many sides of the issues. The position of the press was thus kept in commentary.

The National Telecommunications Commission (NTC) initially warned the country's radio and TV networks of a possible forced closure on any network that airs the contents of the Ong tapes. In response, the International Federation of Journalists (IFJ) condemned the Arroyo administration for attempting to restrict the airing of the Ong recordings. Eventually, the media were allowed to present the evidence to the public. Three out of seven VHF TV channels are controlled by the government.

"Truth is Arroyo won," according to University of the Philippines economist Solita Collas Monsod in her column, Get Real, Philippine Daily Inquirer, October 29, 2005. Monsod cited three reasons to support her claim that President Gloria Macapagal Arroyo won the May 2004 presidential race.

Sec. Ricardo Saludo in his article, "Who Won the Elections?", wrote: "a final set of numbers buttressing the President's triumph and the consistency of results were the victories of most of her fellow candidates for nearly all positions, K-4 captured close to 90% of the congressional, gubernatorial and mayoral positions."

These overwhelming successes in districts, provinces, cities and municipalities nationwide could not but have helped the coalition's presidential standard bearer to also garner big votes among most of those constituencies, according to Saludo.

"Then there was the endorsement (albeit last minute -- but this shows that they were jumping on the bandwagon) that Ms. Arroyo received from the Iglesia ni Cristo and El Shaddai. And finally, it was generally acknowledged that Poe was shooting himself in the foot during the campaign, and that the opposition was split four ways. In other words, they did it to themselves," Monsod wrote.

"Given all these, the bottom line is: Like it or not, Ms. Arroyo is our legitimate President. Let us not allow ourselves to be misled by those who are themselves misled or who have their own political ambitions," Monsod concluded. (PIA Ilocos)

== Attempts for an impeachment trial ==
On June 27, human rights lawyer Oliver Lozano filed an impeachment case against Arroyo on the grounds of "betrayal of public trust". Ten minutes later, Jose Rizaldo P. Lopez, a private citizen, filed a similar impeachment complaint. The mainstream pro-impeachment bloc in Congress advocated an amended version of the Lozano complaint.

On August 23, the justice committee delayed a vote on the impeachment complaints, instead focusing on a vote on procedures. The committee eventually sent Report 1012 to the rest of the House of Representatives. The report suggested that impeachment proceedings should cease altogether. Both chambers of Congress and the justice committee are dominated by Arroyo's coalition allies.

== Aftermath ==
After the failure of impeachment, a broad coalition of protesters engaged the government in peaceful protest for several days, which was reminiscent of the People Power Revolution of 1986. Some of those protesters included former president Corazon Aquino and former vice president Teofisto Guingona, Jr. Due to the lack of protesters that took part in common venues, the government's hard line approach in regulating traditional protesting venues in Mendiola and EDSA, and other factors, the protests did not affect the outcome in Congress. Thus, its power soon diminished. Lingering protests remain, accompanied by a campaign to present evidence directly to the electorate, since such evidence were restricted from use in trial. Arroyo eventually pressed on with certain reforms, albeit unrelated to the crisis, that included new taxes that will shrink government's fiscal deficit. The economy was described as resilient, especially since its recovery was not affected by the scandal. Despite Arroyo's preservation of her hold onto authority, and a resilient economy, most analysts agreed that the scandal failed to address its root causes - pervasive electoral fraud conducted by candidates during elections, the faulty electoral system, and the Commission on Elections that encourages fraud. Accordingly, confidence in Arroyo declined as explained by Amando Doronila of the Philippine Daily Inquirer who said:

"The quashing of the complaints is an empty victory for the administration. It merely demonstrated that the administration has the capacity to deploy the advantages of incumbency to save the president from being unseated. Until the president stands trial where she can defend herself and where it can be shown that the accusations are false and do not constitute impeachable offenses, it would be hard for her to regain public confidence and reestablish the legitimacy of her government."

The crisis arguably ended with the failure of both the impeachment process and the people power movement to have Arroyo face a public trial. However the scandal persists, with the electoral fraud issue still unresolved. This is a factor that led to the use of emergency powers by Arroyo in early 2006.

== Injunction ==
On September 6, 2007, retired Philippine Court of Appeals Justices Santiago Ranada and Oswaldo Agcaoili filed (a 15-page petition for prohibition with temporary restraining order or preliminary injunction) with the Supreme Court of the Philippines to enjoin the September 7, 2007 Senate of the Philippines (committee on national defense) wiretap probe (on the alleged wiretapping of telephone conversations of President Arroyo and former election commissioner Virgilio Garcillano inter alia). On February 12, 2008, the Supreme Court, in a preliminary voting, favored the airing of the Garci tapes, thus nullifying the National Telecommunications Commission (NTC) order. But the final voting was scheduled on Friday.

== See also ==
- 2004 Philippine presidential election
- Fraud: Gloria Macapagal-Arroyo and the May 2004 Elections, a 2006 book about the scandal
- Trump–Raffensperger scandal, a similar scandal in the United States that took place in 2021
