= Abellon =

Abellon is a surname. Notable people with the surname include:

- André Abellon (1375–1450), French Roman Catholic priest
- Richard Abellon (died 2008), Filipino bishop
