= Renato Abibico =

20th and 21st-century Filipino Episcopal bishop

The Right Reverend Renato Abibico
- Former Prime Bishop of the Philippines
- Church: Episcopal Church in the Philippines
- In office: 20 November 2014–15 October 2017
- Predecessor: Edward Malecdan
- Successor: Joel Pachao
- Previous post: Bishop of Northern Luzon (1997–2014)

Orders
- Ordination: 29 June 1975 by Edward Longid
- Consecration: 11 April 1997 by Ignacio Soliba
- Rank: Priest (1975); Bishop (1997)

Personal details
- Born: 2 February 1951 (age 75) Sabangan, Mountain Province, Philippines

Renato Mag-Gay Abibico (born 2 February 1951 in Sabangan, Mountain Province) is a retired Filipino Episcopalian bishop. He served as Bishop of Northern Luzon (1997 to 2014) and was the Prime Bishop of the Episcopal Church in the Philippines from his enthronement on 20 November 2014 to his retirement in October 2017. He is married and a father of five children.

== Early studies ==
Abibico studied at St. Joseph School, in Sabangan, and at San Alfonso High School, in Quezon City, from 1963 to 1967. He continued his studies at Trinity College, at the same city, from 1967 to 1969, where he became an associate in arts.

== Ecclesiastical career ==
Abibico entered religious life, studying at SATS, from 1969 to 1974, where he earned a bachelor's degree in theology. He later earned a master's degree in 1988. He was ordained to the Episcopal diaconate on 27 December 1974 and to the priesthood on 29 June 1975. He did a masters of theology and development at the University of Edinburgh, Scotland, in 1992 and 199393.

Abibico held several religious offices until being nominated simultaneously administrative officer and development officer at the Northern Luzon Diocese, in 1986. He would be in charge of both offices until 1997.

Abibico was consecrated bishop of the Episcopal diocese of Northern Luzon at the Cathedral of Holy Trinity in Bulanao, Tabuk, Kalinga, on 11 April 1997. He was elected Prime Bishop of the Episcopal Church in the Philippines at the second session of the second day of the 9th Regular Synod, on 25 August 2014. His enthronement took place on 20 November 2014. He retired in October 2017.

Anglican Communion titles
Preceded by Edward Malecdan	Prime Bishop of the Episcopal Church in the Philippines; 2014–2017	Succeeded by Joel Pachao
Preceded by Ignacio C. Soliba	Bishop of the Episcopal Diocese of Northern Luzon; 1997– 2014	Succeeded by Esteban Sabawil
