= Iloilo Accord =

- Type: Academic consortium
- Location: Philippines
- Affiliations: United Board for Christian Higher Education in Asia

The Iloilo Accord is an academic consortium between three Philippine universities: the Central Philippine University, Silliman University, and Trinity University of Asia. Historically, these universities have regarded each other as sister schools having been founded by American Protestant missionaries belonging to three denominations: Baptists, Presbyterians, and the Episcopalians (the latter in local partnership with Aglipayans). Funded by the United Board for Christian Higher Education in Asia (UBCHEA), its aims are laid out as follows:

(1) to develop a working relationship among CPU, Silliman and Trinity College of Quezon City (now Trinity University Asia) in furtherance of the common interest of these institutions; (2) to forge a joint academic development program which is the priority of relationship among the three institutions; (3) to jointly endeavor to improve/upgrade their tertiary education through faculty development program; (4) to share/exchange of academic resources by the three institutions when found to be possible; (5) to research collaboration in areas of mutual interest to the three institutions; (6) to cooperate in the production and publication of textbooks and other instructional materials; (7) to strengthen the campus ministry program through joint training and exchange of chaplains and others involved in the program; (8) to improve the financial management and operation; (9) to utilize information technology to improve/upgrade the higher education program of the three institutions; (10) to strengthen outreach programs through exchange visits and joint outreach activities; (11) to sponsor joint seminars/ workshops and others academic meetings on matters of mutual interest; and (12) to pursue student exchange program among the three institutions.
