= Artemio Zabala =

Artemio Masweng Zabala (born 31 March 1935) is a retired Filipino Episcopalian bishop. Zabala currently serves as retired bishop in residence in the Episcopal Diocese of Los Angeles.

Zabala was the first Bishop of the Episcopal Diocese of North Central Philippines in February 1989. He resigned in 1992 to be the Church's missionary to the Diocese of Los Angeles, and was replaced by Joel A. Pachao in 1993.

== Bibliography ==
- F.D. Maurice: An Inquiry Into His Theological Method (Toronto School of Theology thesis, 1973)
- “Advent Reflections on Colossians 1:15–20 in the Philippine Setting,” Asian Journal of Theology 3 (1989): 316.
