= Robert Longid =

Robert Lee Omengan Longid (October 19, 1935– January 20, 1996) was a Filipino Episcopalian bishop. He was bishop of the Diocese of the Northern Philippines in the Episcopal Church in the Philippines from 1986 to 1996. He was consecrated as a suffragan bishop in 1983. He was the son of Bishop Edward G. Longid.

Anglican Communion titles
Preceded by Richard Abellon	Bishop of the Episcopal Diocese of Northern Philippines; 1986– 1996	Succeeded by Edward Malecdan
Preceded by Edward G. Longid	Suffragan Bishop of the Episcopal Diocese of Northern Philippines; 1983– 1986	Succeeded by Miguel Yamoyam
