= Benito Cabanban =

The Right Reverend Benito C. Cabanban
- the Philippines
- Province: The Episcopal Church
- Diocese: Episcopal Church in the Philippines

Orders
- Consecration: February 24, 1959

Personal details
- Born: May 9, 1911
- Died: November 22, 1990 (aged 79)

Benito C. Cabanban was the first native bishop of the Philippines in The Episcopal Church. He served as Suffragan Bishop before he became the first Presiding Bishop of the Philippines for the Philippine Episcopal Church from 1967 to 1978 when the church was elevated from missionary district to a full-fledged diocese under The Episcopal Church in the United States.
