= Narciso Ticobay =

Filipino Episopalian bishop

The Most Reverend Narciso V. Ticobay Prime Bishop
- 2nd Prime bishop of the Episcopal Church in the Philippines
- Church: Episcopal Church
- Diocese: Episcopal Diocese of Southern Philippines
- In office: 1993-1997
- Predecessor: Richard Abellon
- Successor: Ignacio C. Soliba
- Other post: Bishop of Southern Philippines (1986-1993)

Orders
- Ordination: 13 July 1957 (Deacon), 07 June 1959 (Priest) by Lyman Ogilby (deacon and Priest)
- Consecration: 27 July 1986, Cathedral of Saints Peter and Paul by Manuel C. Lumpias

Personal details
- Born: Narciso Valentin Ticobay; March 19, 1932 Besao, Mountain Province
- Died: July 21, 2013 (aged 81)
- Spouse: Angelita Degay
- Education: Saint Andrew's Theological Seminary

Narciso Valentin Ticobay (19 March 1932 – 21 July 2013) was a Filipino Episcopalian bishop. He was the second Prime Bishop of the Episcopal Church in the Philippines from 1993 to 1997. He also served as the second Diocesan Bishop of the Episcopal Diocese of Southern Philippines (EDSP) from 1986 to 1993. He died in 2013 at the age of 81.

Anglican Communion titles
Preceded by Richard Abellon	Prime Bishop of the Episcopal Church in the Philippines; 1990 – 1992	Succeeded by Ignacio C. Soliba
Preceded by Richard Abellon	Bishop of the Episcopal Diocese of Southern Philippines; 1986 – 1993	Succeeded by James Manguramas
