= Edward Malecdan =

Filipino Episcopalian bishop (1949–2018)

The Most Reverend Edward Malecdan
- 4th Prime bishop of the Episcopal Church in the Philippines
- Church: Episcopal Church in the Philippines
- In office: 2009–2014
- Predecessor: Ignacio C. Soliba
- Successor: Renato Abibico
- Previous post: Bishop of Northern Philippines

Orders
- Ordination: 2 December 1980
- Consecration: 10 December 1997

Personal details
- Born: 6 February 1949
- Died: 28 April 2018 (aged 69)

Edward Pacyaya Malecdan (6 February 1949 – 28 April 2018) was a Filipino Episcopalian bishop who served as the Prime Bishop of the Episcopal Church in the Philippines from 2009 to 2014.

He had previously been Dean of St. Andrew's Theological Seminary (SATS) in the Philippines. He was Bishop of the Northern Philippines in 2000, when the Episcopal Diocese of Northeastern Luzon was created. He died on 28 April 2018.

Anglican Communion titles
Preceded by Ignacio C. Soliba	Prime Bishop of the Episcopal Church in the Philippines; 2009–2014	Succeeded by Renato Abibico
Preceded by vacant, title last held by Robert Longid	Bishop of the Episcopal Diocese of Northern Philippines; 1997–2009	Succeeded by Brent Alawas
