= Nestor Poltic =

Filipino Episcopalian bishop

The Most Reverend Nestor Poltic
- Prime Bishop of the Episcopal Church in the Philippines
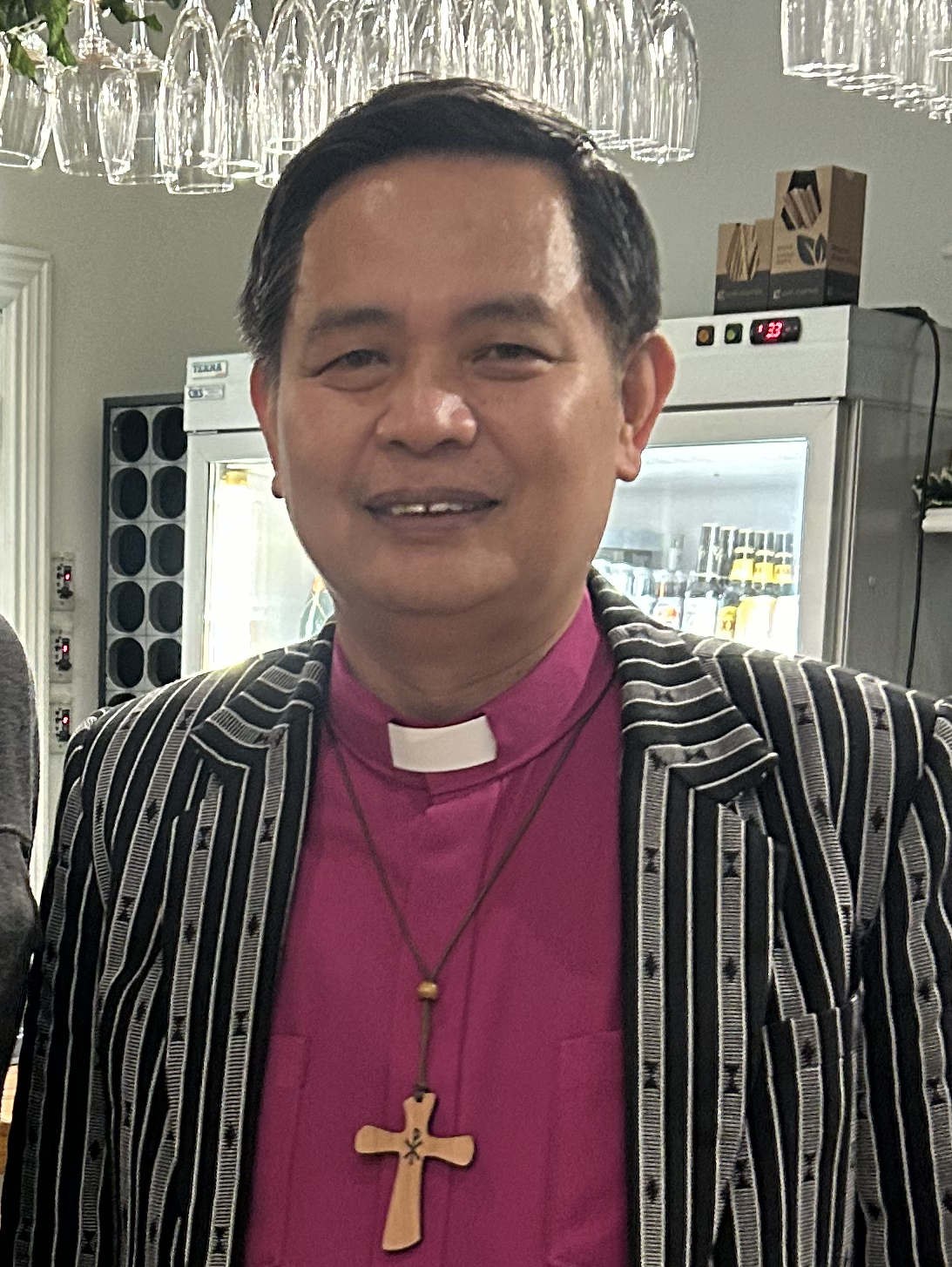
- Church: Episcopal Church in the Philippines
- In office: 2025–present
- Predecessor: Brent Alawas
- Previous post: Bishop of the North Central Philippines (2018–2025)

Orders
- Ordination: March 18, 1992 (diaconate); June 3, 1993 (priesthood)
- Consecration: May 1, 2018 by Joel Pachao

Personal details
- Born: October 27, 1967 (age 58)

Nestor Dagas Poltic Sr. (born October 27, 1967) is a Filipino Episcopalian bishop. From 2018 to 2025, he was the bishop of the Diocese of the North Central Philippines in the Episcopal Church in the Philippines, and since 2025 he has been prime bishop of the church.

== Biography ==
Poltic was born in 1967 as one of eight children. He was raised in Kapangan, Benguet. He received his theology degree from St. Andrew's Theological Seminary at a master's degree in biblical studies at the Ecumenical Theological Seminary in Baguio.

Poltic was ordained to the diaconate in 1992 at St. Jude's Church, Buguias, and made a priest in 1993 at Ascension Church in Kapangan. He was rector of St. Jude's from 1993 to 2006. He later was a rector in La Trinidad and dean of the Cathedral of the Resurrection in Baguio. In addition to his parish roles, Poltic held several diocesan and ecumenical leadership roles prior to his election as bishop of the North Central Philippines and his consecration in 2018.

In May 2024, Poltic was elected by the church's triennial synod as prime bishop to succeed Brent Alawas. He was installed as prime bishop in March 2025.

Anglican Communion titles
Preceded by Joel Pachao	Bishop of the Diocese of the North Central Philippines; 2018–2025	Vacant
Preceded by Brent Alawas	Prime Bishop of the Episcopal Church in the Philippines; 2025–present	Incumbent
