= Joel Pachao =

Filipino Episcopalian bishop (born 1956)

The Most Reverend Joel Pachao
- Prime Bishop of the Philippines
- Church: Episcopal Church in the Philippines
- In office: 2017–2021
- Predecessor: Renato Abibico
- Successor: Brent Alawas

Orders
- Ordination: 29 July 1981
- Consecration: 25 March 1992 by Artemio Zabala

Personal details
- Born: 29 July 1956 (age 69)

Joel Atiwag Pachao (born 29 July 1956) is a retired Filipino Episcopalian bishop. He was elected Prime Bishop of the Episcopal Church in the Philippines on 16 May 2017. He is married to Precilla, with two now-adult children.

== Ecclesiastical career ==
Pachao graduated from St. Andrew's Theological Seminary in Quezon City, in 1979. He was ordained an Episcopal deacon on 24 June 1979, and a priest on 29 July 1981. He would serve in seven different locations for the following decade. He was elected Bishop of the Episcopal Diocese of Northern Central Philippines on 9 January 1992 and was consecrated at the Pro-Cathedral of the Resurrection in Baguio on 25 March 1992.

He was elected Prime Bishop of the Episcopal Church in the Philippines in an election held on 16 May 2017, at the second ballot, with other two candidates. He was enthroned later the same year at the Cathedral of St. Mary and St. John, in Quezon City, by incumbent Prime Bishop Renato Abibico.

Anglican Communion titles
Preceded by Renato Abibico	Prime Bishop of the Episcopal Church in the Philippines; 2017–2021	Succeeded by Brent Alawas
Preceded by Artemio Zabala	Bishop of the Episcopal Diocese of North Central Philippines; 1993–2017	Succeeded by Nestor Poltic
