= Edward Longid =

Episcopal bishop in the Philippines

Edward Gaudan Longid (died September 23, 1993) was a Filipino Anglican bishop of the Episcopal Church in the Philippines. He was consecrated as a suffragan bishop on February 2, 1963, in the Cathedral of St. Mary and St. John in Quezon City. He was the first diocesan bishop of the Northern Philippines, serving from 1972 to 1975. He had seven children, one of whom, Robert Longid, was later a bishop of the same diocese.
