= Brent Alawas =

Filipino Episcopalian bishop

The Most Reverend Brent Harry Alawas
- Prime Bishop of the Philippines
- Church: Episcopal Church in the Philippines
- In office: 2021–2025
- Predecessor: Joel Pachao
- Successor: Nestor Poltic
- Previous post: Bishop of the Northern Philippines

Orders
- Consecration: 28 October 2009 by Edward Malecdan
- Rank: Bishop

Personal details
- Born: 27 March 1957 (age 69)

Brent Harry Wanas Alawas (born March 27, 1957) is a Filipino Episcopalian bishop. From 2021 to 2025, he was prime bishop and primate of the Episcopal Church in the Philippines. Prior to this, he was bishop of the Diocese of Northern Philippines. He was elected prime bishop in April 2021 and installed in June after the retirement of the previous primate.

Anglican Communion titles
Preceded by Joel Pachao	Prime Bishop of the Episcopal Church in the Philippines; 2021–2025	Succeeded by Nestor Poltic
Preceded by Edward Malecdan	Bishop of the Episcopal Diocese of Northern Philippines; 2009–2021	Succeeded by Benny Lang-akan
