= Cathedral of St. Mary and St. John =

Anglican church in Quezon City, Philippines

- National Cathedral and Collegiate Church of St. Mary and St. John
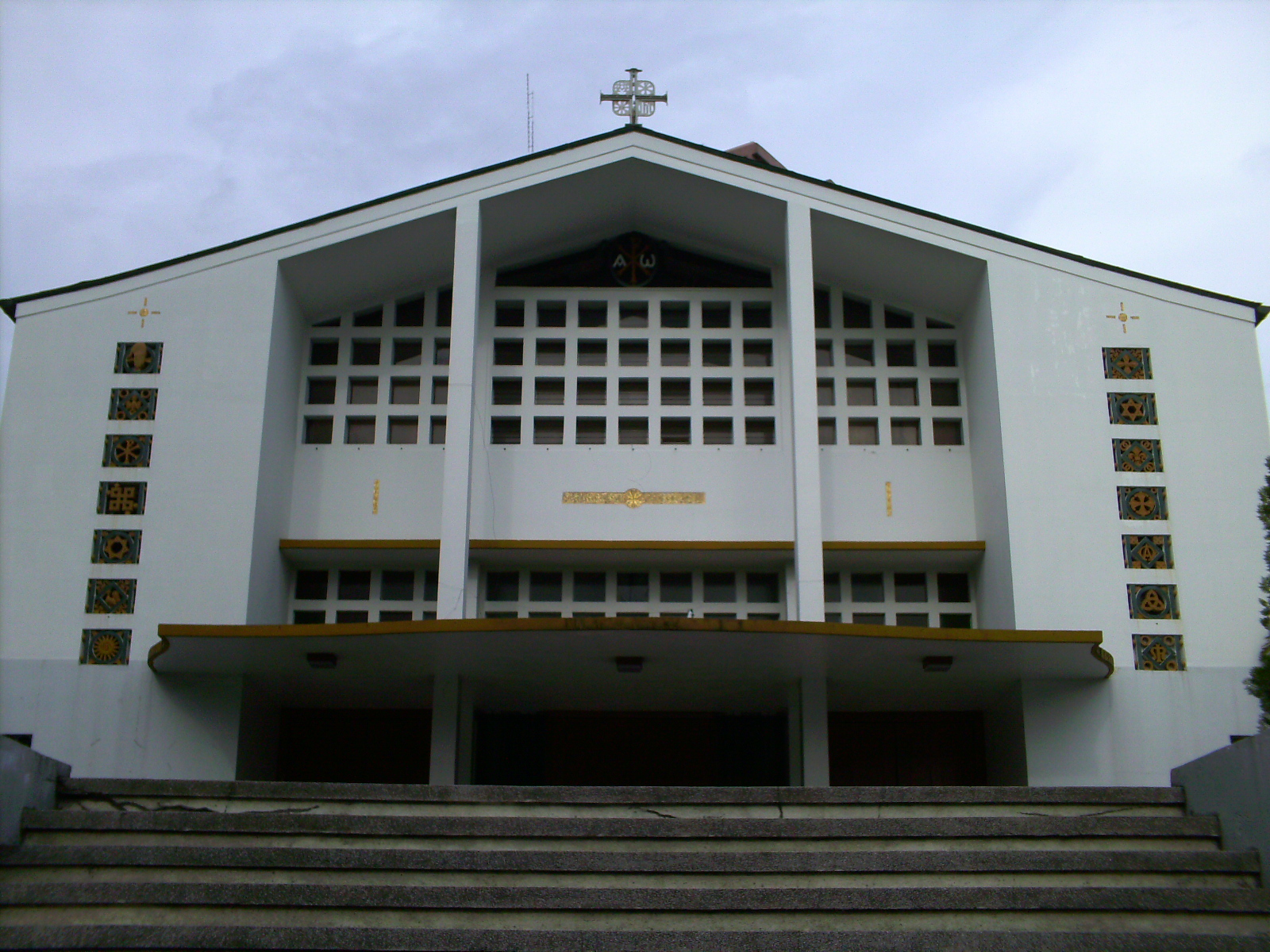
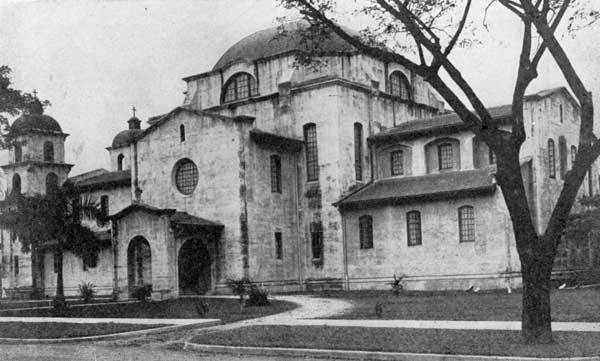
- Top: New building built in 1954; Bottom: Old cathedral (destroyed in WW2)
- Cathedral of St. Mary and St. John
- 14°37′19″N 121°1′21″E
- Location: Cathedral Heights, Quezon City
- Country: Philippines
- Denomination: Anglican

History
- Status: National Cathedral
- Founded: 1903
- Dedication: Mary, mother of Jesus; John the Apostle
- Consecrated: February 9, 1962 (present church building)

Architecture
- Functional status: Active
- Groundbreaking: January 25, 1905 (old building)
- Completed: 1907 (old building)

The Cathedral of St. Mary and St. John is an Anglican church in Quezon City, Metro Manila, Philippines. It serves as the National Cathedral of the Episcopal Church in the Philippines.

It was established by Bishop Charles Henry Brent from the then Protestant Episcopal Church of the United States of America initially catering to American and European expatriates in the Philippines. It later also served Filipinos. The groundbreaking of the original church building in Manila situated near Isaac Peral Street was made on January 25, 1905. The construction finished in 1907. The building funded through donations cost at least $120 thousand.

The building was seized by the Japanese on July 8, 1944, during the Japanese occupation of the Philippines amidst World War II and was used as an internment camp. It was destroyed, along with its records, during the Battle of Manila of 1945. The Manila Pavilion Hotel currently occupies the old site.

Bishop Lyman C. Ogilby held talks with John Van Wie Bergamini, the veteran architect of the Episcopal Church throughout the Far East in 1954 in America which led to the construction of the structure currently occupied by the cathedral which was consecrated on February 9, 1962.

== Gallery ==
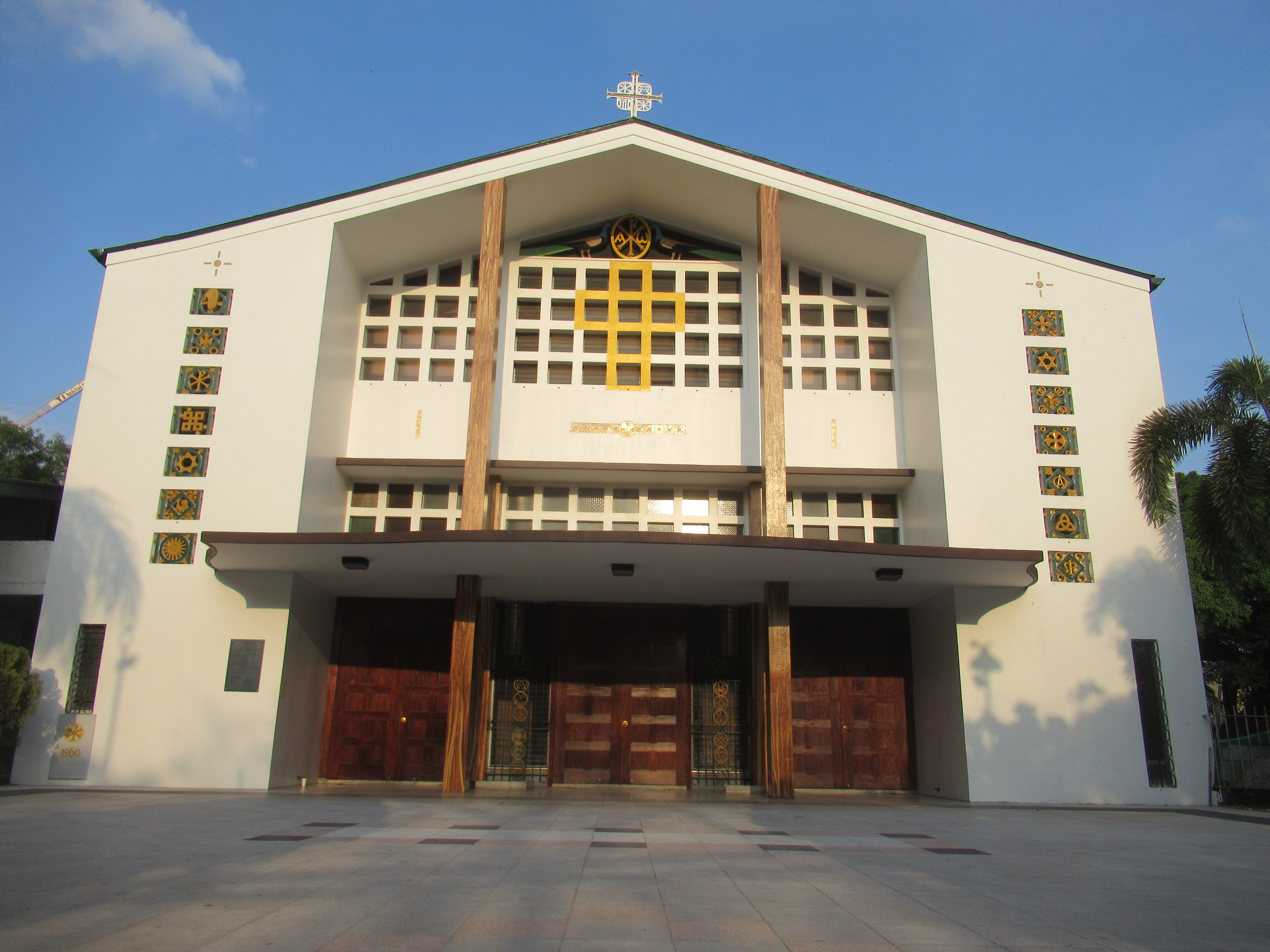
Facade in April 2023

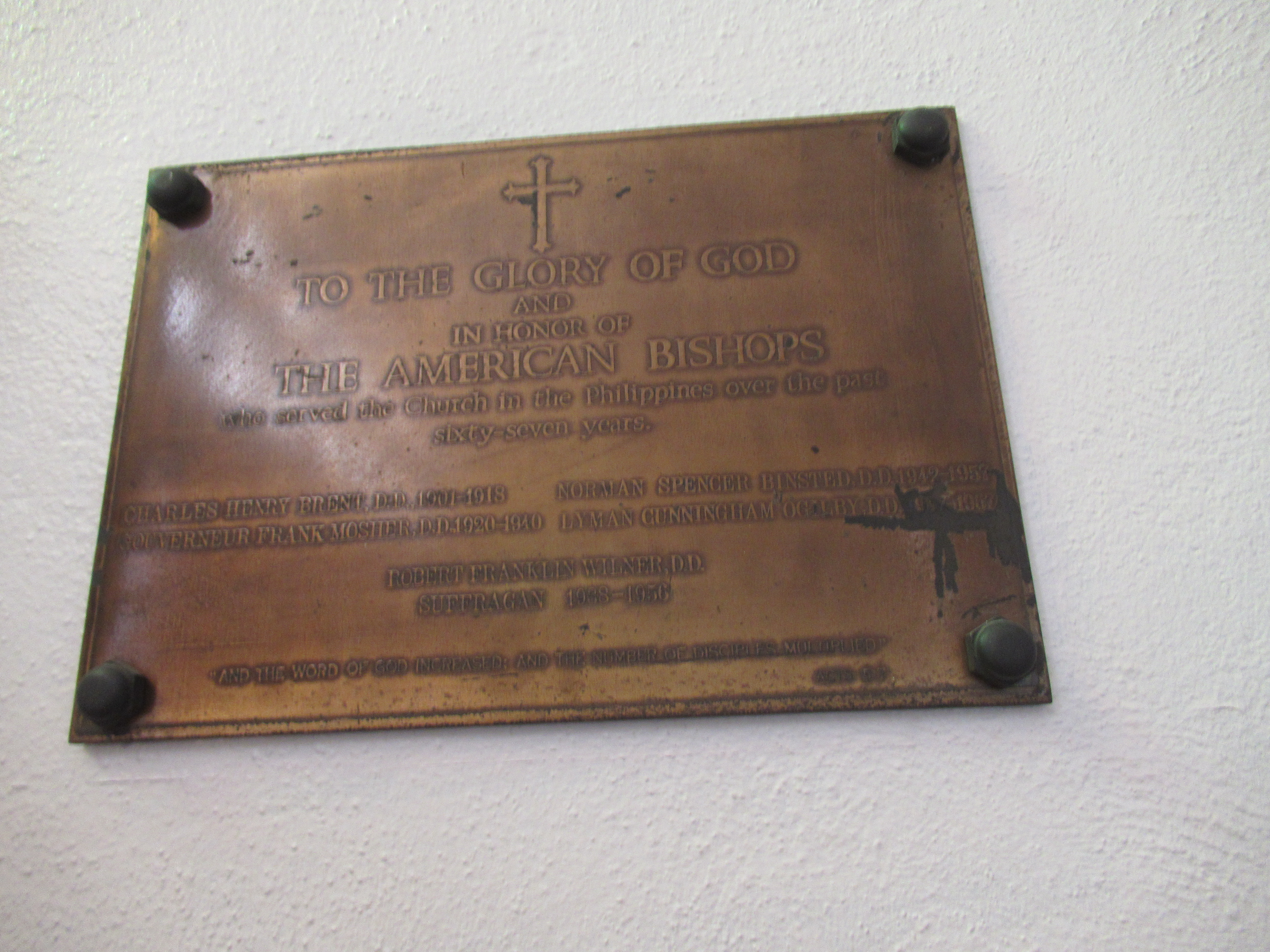
Historical marker

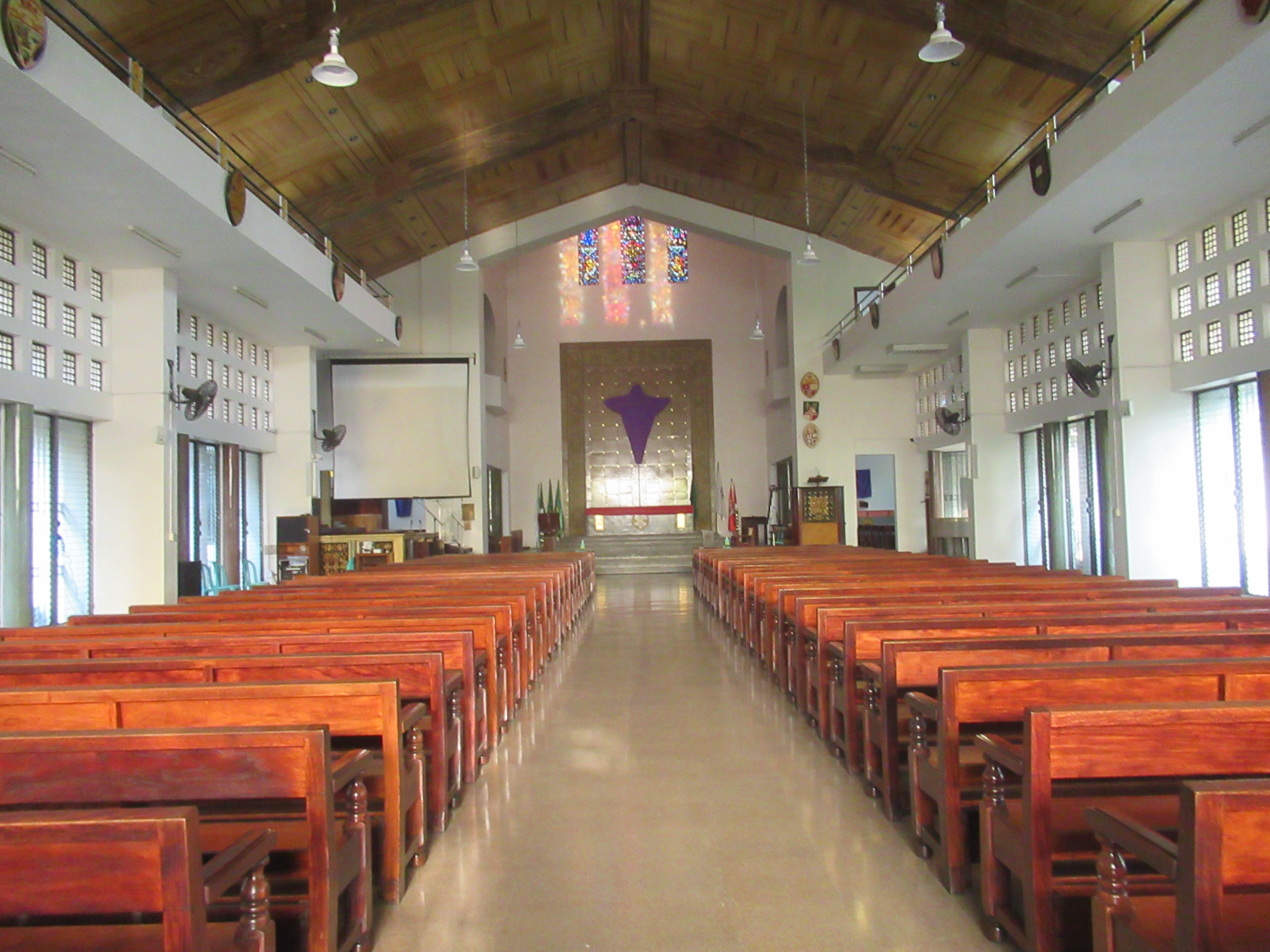
Interior

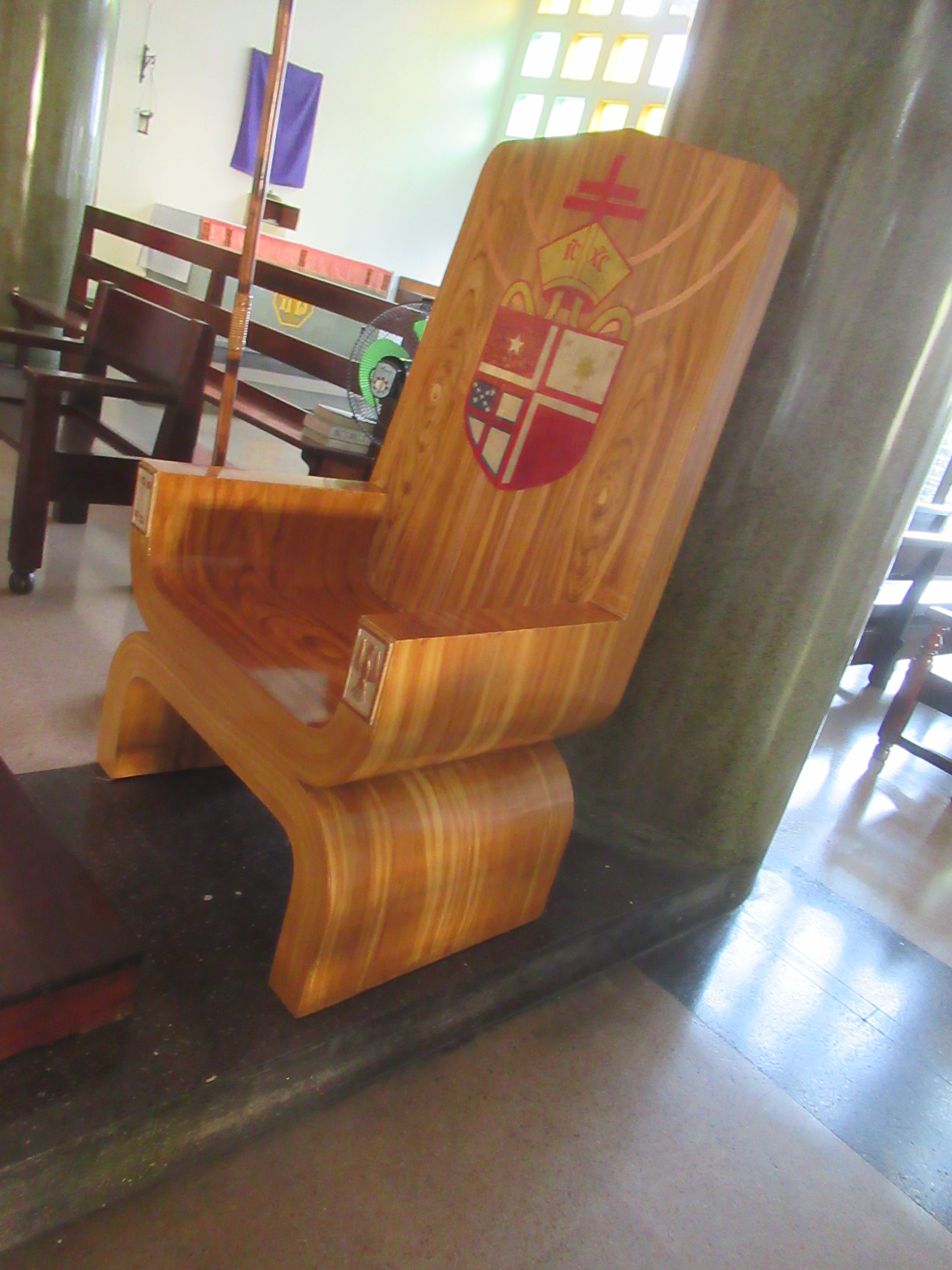
Cathedra

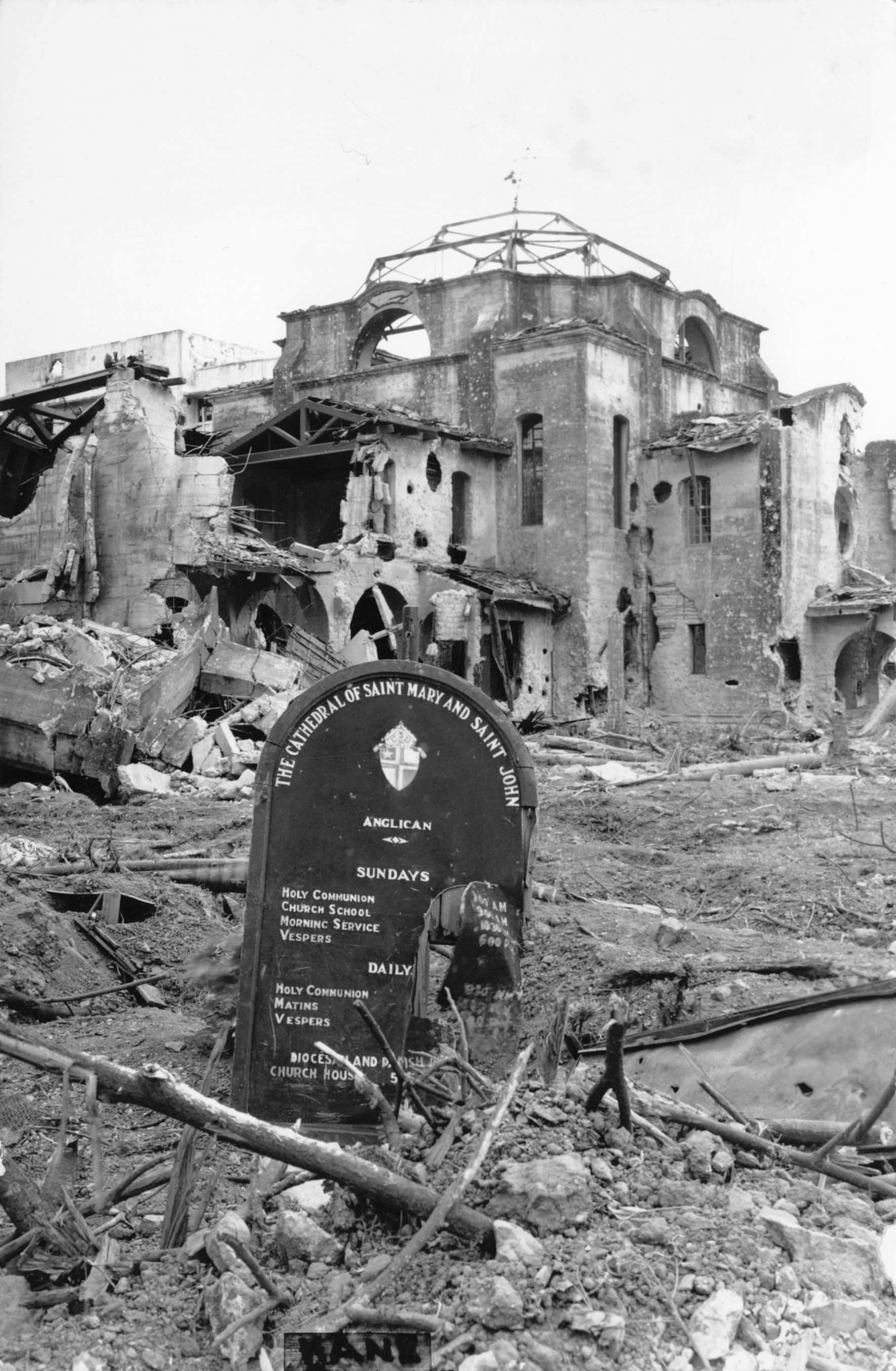
Destroyed during the Battle of Manila in 1945.
