= André Abellon =

French painter

Blessed André Abellon O.P.
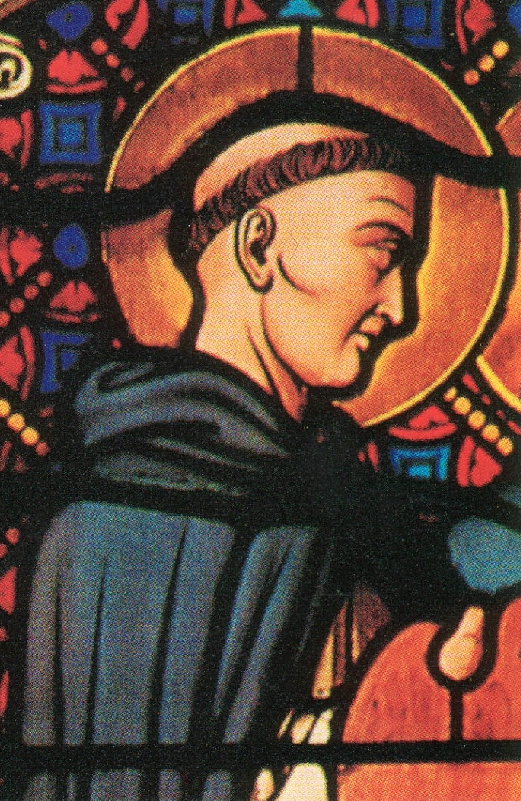

Priest
- Born: 1375; Saint-Maximin, Provence, Kingdom of France
- Died: 15 May 1450 (aged 75); Aix-en-Provence, Kingdom of France
- Venerated in: Roman Catholic Church
- Beatified: 19 August 1902, Saint Peter's Basilica, Kingdom of Italy by Pope Leo XIII
- Feast: 15 May
- Attributes: Dominican habit Paint palette Paintbrush
- Patronage: Artists; Against fevers

André Abellon, O.P. (1375 – 15 May 1450) was a French Catholic priest in the Order of Preachers. He became a Dominican after hearing the preaching of Vincent Ferrer and studied art before joining their ranks. Abellon gained fame as a noted preacher and confessor but became a prominent figure after tending to victims of the plague in Aix-en-Provence in 1445. He was also a noted artist and painter with some of his works still surviving at present.

Abellon's beatification received approval from Pope Leo XIII on 19 August 1902.

== Life ==
André Abellon was born in Provence in 1375.

In his adolescence he had listened to the preaching of Vincent Ferrer and became resolved to imitate his pious life of apostolic zeal. To that end he joined the Order of Preachers at their convent in his hometown of Saint-Maximin and was ordained as a priest after his solemn profession. Abellon later became the prior of the Saint Mary Magdalene convent in Provence which was a neglected building though a noted pilgrimage site. It was said that Mary Magdalene went there to do penance for her sins and it laid claim to some of her relics. But Abellon also taught seminarians theological studies in Montpellier as well as in Avignon and Paris for a time.

The humble friar supported the work of the missionaries and he often preached missions to the faithful while in 1445 tending to the victims of the plague in Aix which made him a well-known and beloved figure. Abellon was also a noted artist and painter for he had studied these subjects prior to entering the Dominicans. He tended to the spiritual needs of the pilgrims who came to the convent and he desired to establish a permanent foundation for that work at the shrine. To that end he obtained the financial support of the Queen of France who provided him with the funds needed to set up this new building. His artistic and architectural talents helped the project become a great success and restore fame to the pilgrimage site. He also established two mills near the shrine for the local farmers to support their agricultural needs.

He died in 1450 and was interred in the convent he served in.

== Beatification ==
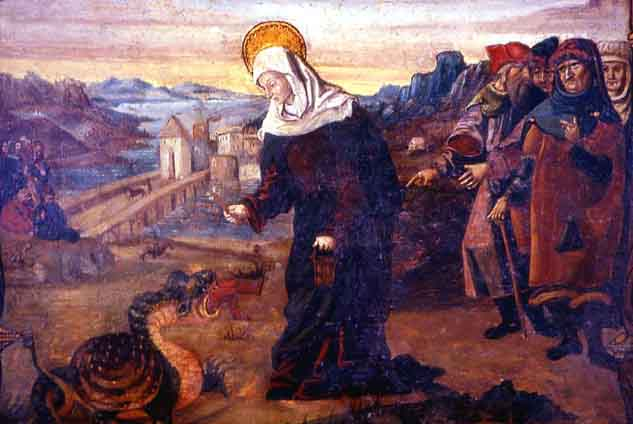
Abellon's painting of Saint Martha and the dragon, or Tarasque (c. 1430).

His beatification was approved on 19 August 1902 after Pope Leo XIII signed a decree that recognized the late priest's longstanding and popular "cultus" - or veneration - which acted as a prerequisite for beatification for older causes of sainthood.
