= Episcopal Church in the Philippines =

Ecclesiastical province of the Anglican Communion

- Seal of the Episcopal Church in the Philippines
- Abbreviation: ECP
- Type: Western Christian
- Classification: Protestant (Mainline)
- Orientation: Anglican
- Scripture: Holy Bible
- Theology: Anglican doctrine
- Polity: Episcopal
- Prime Bishop: Nestor Poltic
- Associations: Anglican Communion; National Council of Churches in the Philippines; Christian Conference of Asia; World Council of Churches
- Full communion: Philippine Independent Church
- Region: Philippines
- Headquarters: Cathedral Heights, New Manila, Quezon City, Philippines
- Origin: 1901 (as the Missionary District of the Philippine Islands)
- Independence: 1990
- Branched from: The Episcopal Church in the United States
- Members: 125,000
- Tertiary institutions: Trinity University of Asia; Easter College Incorporated
- Seminaries: St. Andrew's Theological Seminary
- Official website: www.ecphilippines.org

The Episcopal Church in the Philippines (ECP; Tagalog: Simbahang Episkopal sa Pilipinas) is a province of the Anglican Communion comprising the country of the Philippines. It was established by the Episcopal Church of the United States (Protestant Episcopal Church in the United States of America) in 1901 by American missionaries led by Charles Henry Brent, who served as the first resident bishop, when the Philippines was opened to Protestant American missionaries. It became an autonomous province of the Anglican Communion on May 1, 1990.

At present, the Episcopal Church has seven dioceses. Under the Rev. Charles Henry Brent of the Episcopal Church in the United States of America, it was responsible for founding and overseeing institutions such as St. Luke's Medical Center, Brent International School, St. Stephen's High School, and Trinity University of Asia. Its principal ministerial training institution is St. Andrew's Theological Seminary. The current prime bishop is Nestor Poltic. Its national headquarters is the Cathedral Heights, New Manila, Quezon City.

The Church is in a concordat of full communion with the Philippine Independent Church and is a member of both the Christian Conference of Asia and the National Council of Churches in the Philippines.

== History ==
=== Military chaplaincy and church for expatriates ===
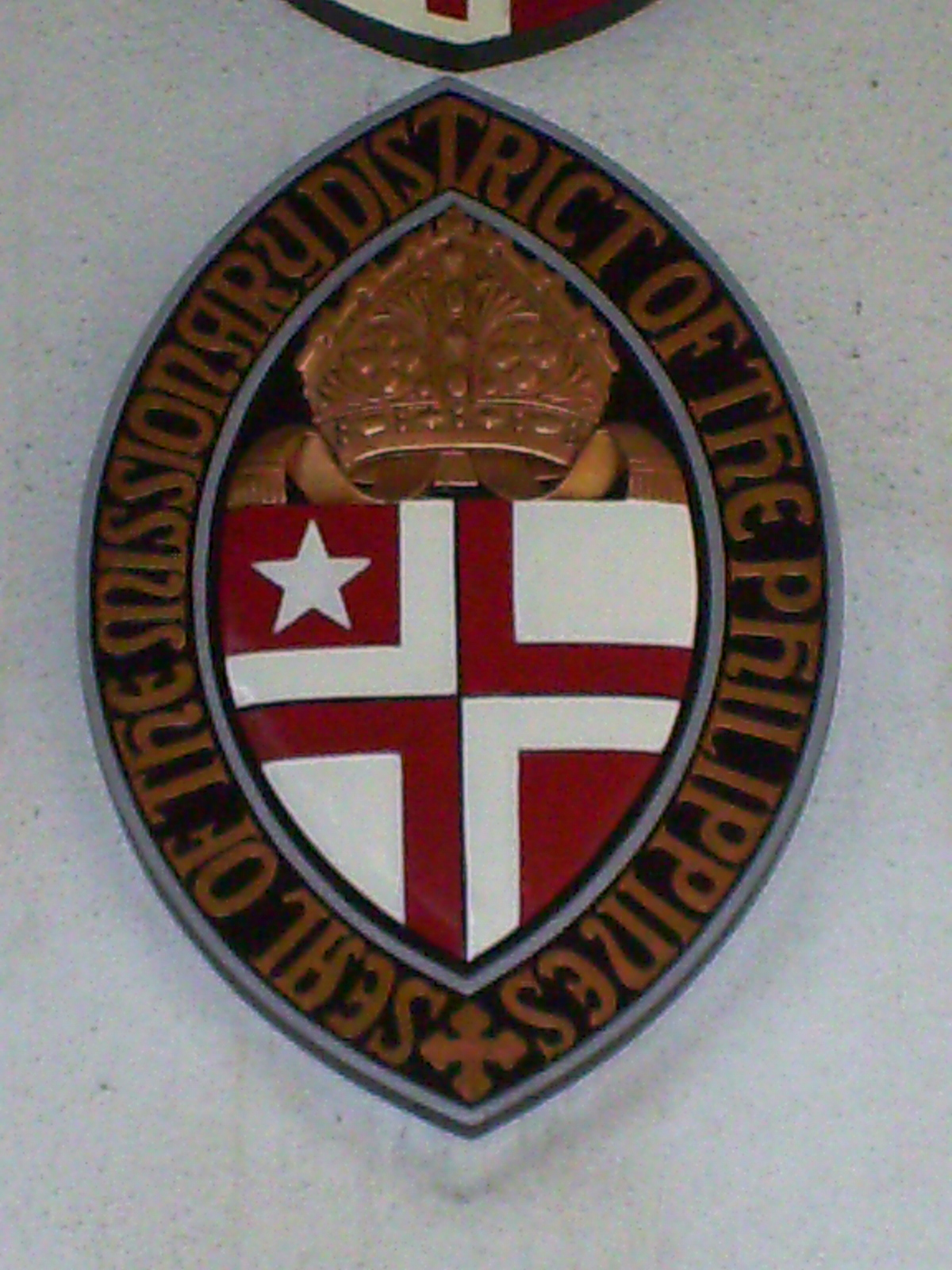
The emblem of the Anglican/Episcopal Church in the Philippines when it was still a missionary province under the Episcopal Church in the United States

Through the 1898 Treaty of Paris ending the Spanish–American War, the Philippine Islands were ceded to the United States and opened to American Protestant missions. A comity agreement was created between various Protestant churches to divide the islands. The Episcopalians and Seventh-day Adventists did not join the agreement as they wanted to go elsewhere in the Philippines.

The first Episcopal worship service was conducted in the Philippines by the Rev. Charles Pierce, an Episcopal Church chaplain of the U.S. Armed Forces that occupied Manila in 1898. This service was conducted on September 4, 1898, for the Americans and other English-speaking residents of the colonial capital. The first Episcopal Church worship service for Filipinos took place on December 25, 1898, Christmas Day.

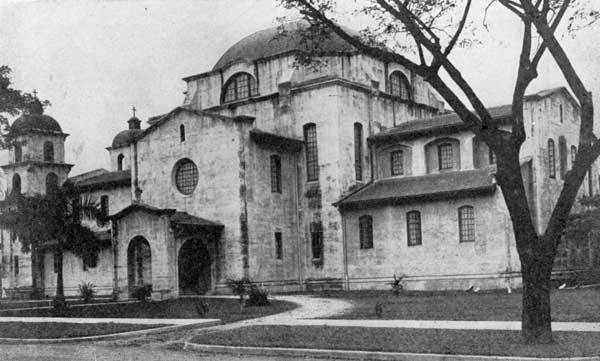
The Cathedral of St. Mary and St. John in Manila (1923), before it was destroyed in World War II

In April 1899, Hugh Nethercott and James Smiley of the Brotherhood of St. Andrew arrived to assist the American chaplains in their work. In September 1899, Frederick R. Graves, who was then serving as the Bishop of Shanghai in China, visited Manila. Appointed to oversee American church work in the Philippines and later, bishop-in-charge, he held worship services in the home of a British couple. He confirmed five English-speaking persons and advised his congregation to build a church. He also received the first seven Filipinos into the Episcopal Church.

The first baptisms in Manila were performed in 1900 by U.S. Army Chaplain John Marvine when he baptized three Amoy-speaking nationals and 12 more by the end of the year. These baptisms formally started Episcopal mission work among the Chinese in Manila.

=== As a missionary district of PECUSA ===
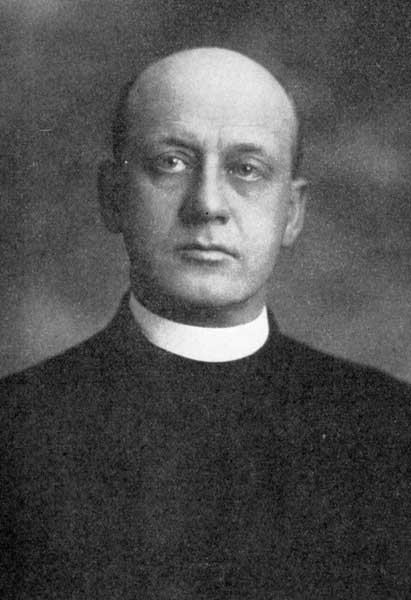
The Rev. Gouverneur Frank Mosher, the Bishop of the Episcopal Church in the Philippines from 1920 to 1941

From being a mere outreach chaplaincy of the Episcopal Church chaplains of the U.S. occupying forces in the Philippines were temporarily placed under the oversight of Bishop Frederick Graves. Itwas officially created as the Missionary District of the Philippine Islands of the Protestant Episcopal Church in the United States (PECUSA) by the PECUSA General Convention held in San Francisco from October 4–11, 1901. The same convention elected the Rev. Charles Henry Brent as bishop. In December 1901, Brent was consecrated and became the first bishop of the Missionary District under the jurisdiction of PECUSA. His successor, Gouverneur Frank Mosher, served from 1920 to 1941.

From October 11, 1901, when the church was officially established in the Philippines, it took almost 36 years until the first Filipino Episcopal clergymen was produced with the ordinations of Eduardo Longid, Albert Masferre, and Mark Suluen to the Sacred Order of Deacons on January 25, 1937. It took another 22 years to produce the first Filipino Episcopal bishop, with the consecration of Benito C. Cabanban as Suffragan Bishop on February 24, 1959.

=== Philippine Episcopal Church ===
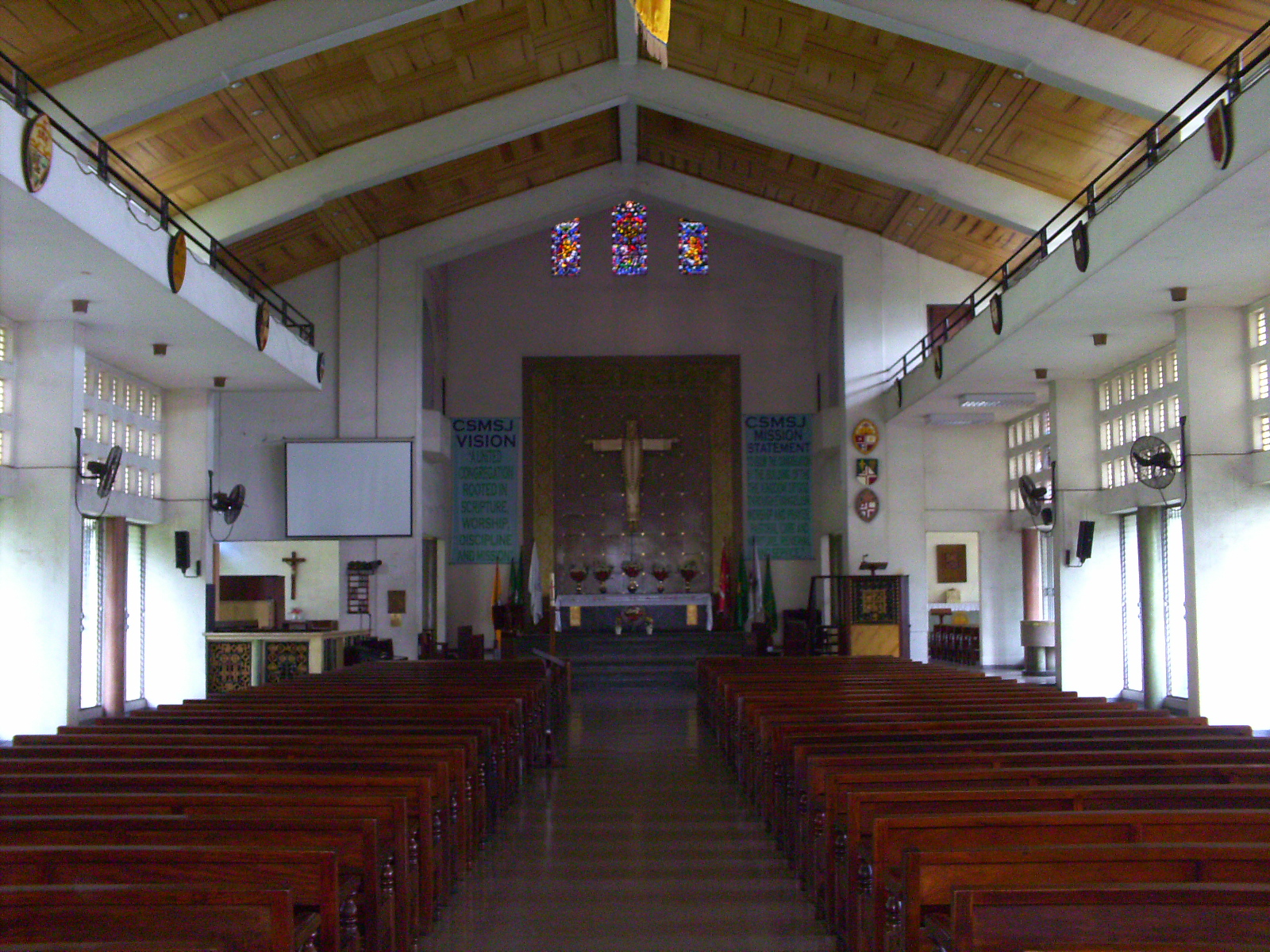
The interior of the modern National Cathedral of the Episcopal Church in the Philippines, dedicated to Saint Mary and Saint John

In October 1937, the Missionary District of the Philippine Islands was renamed the Philippine Episcopal Church (PEC) through the action of the House of Bishops of PECUSA's Cincinnati General Convention. This signified a change in status of the Philippine Church from that of a missionary district to a ‘diocese’ under PECUSA. 34 years later (in October 1971), PECUSA granted the PEC request to divide the lone diocese into three dioceses – the Dioceses of Central, Northern, and Southern Philippines. Each had a Filipino diocesan bishop – Bishop Cabanban, Bishop Eduardo Longid, and Bishop Constancio Manguramas, respectively.

With three dioceses, the PEC was organized and operated like a church province in the Anglican Communion, but unlike these it lacked Metropolitan Authority as it was still under the jurisdiction of PECUSA. The three dioceses were considered dioceses of both the PEC and the Episcopal Church in the U.S.A. (ECUSA).

As a diocese, the PEC had its own constitution and canons, national council, national biennial convention, House of Bishops, and National Office, among others.

=== Full autonomy ===
On May 1, 1990, the PEC was officially separated from ECUSA and inaugurated as an autonomous church, taking its place as a province of the Anglican Communion with the name Episcopal Church in the Philippines (ECP).

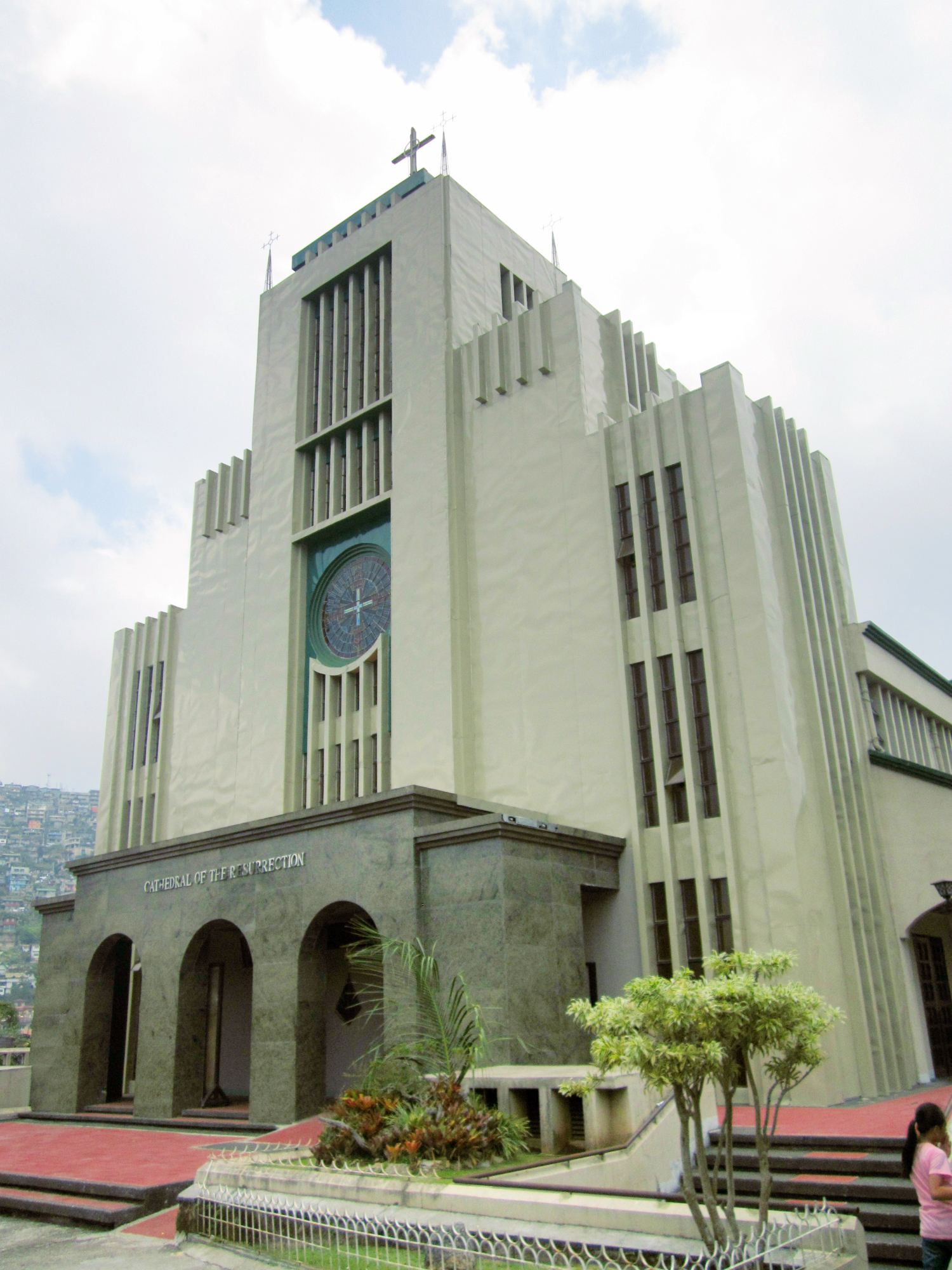
The Cathedral of the Resurrection in Baguio.

When the church had been admitted as a missionary district, its first missionary bishop, Charles Henry Brent, unlike other Protestant missionaries, had no intention of converting Filipino Catholics to Anglicanism. As a consequence, his missionary focus was in parts of the archipelago that had not previously been evangelised, particularly in the mountain provinces and in Mindanao. In Manila, missionary work was also done among the non-Christian Chinese community. Brent also felt his ministry to the American community should be his main focus. He wrote: “From every point of view, the most important part of our work is among Americans and other English-speaking people.” One of the first things he did was to build a cathedral in downtown Manila, the Cathedral of St. Mary & St. John, which was destroyed in World War II and later rebuilt in Quezon City. Part of the pre-War Cathedral congregation formed the Church of the Holy Trinity, now located in the upscale neighbourhood of Forbes Park, Makati. Holy Trinity's priest or rector from its beginning had always been an expatriate, as were most of the congregation; in recent years, this has changed considerably and the present composition is a mixture of Chinese-Filipino, American/European and Filipino.

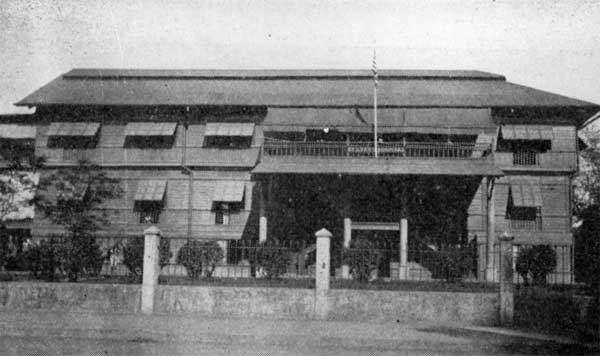
St. Luke's Hospital in Manila (1923)

For the physical health needs of his constituency, Brent also established St. Luke's Hospital (initially named University Hospital, now known as St. Luke's Medical Center). He also endorsed and supported the establishment of St. Luke's Nursing Training School (now St. Luke's-Trinity College of Nursing) to answer the need for well-trained nurses to serve the hospital.

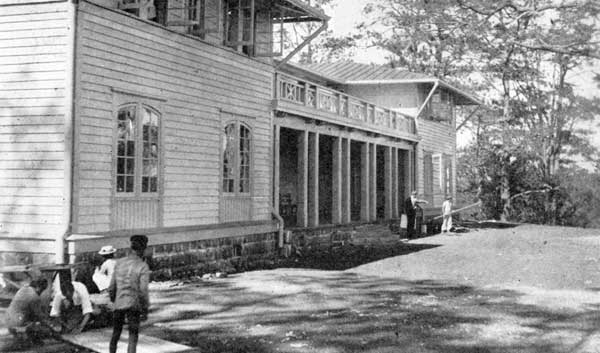
Baguio School for boys in 1923

For the educational needs and in response to requests from the American parents for a boarding school for their children, Bishop Brent founded a school in Baguio for American boys. First called the Baguio School and later Brent School, this school is now known as Brent International School-Baguio. It is one of four Brent International Schools under the umbrella of a mother corporation called Brent International Schools Inc. The others are Brent International School-Manila/Biñan, BIS-Subic, and BIS-Boracay. In addition to children of expatriates, a large number, if not the majority, of enrollees in the Brent Schools are Filipinos from well-to-do families.

With regard to starting missionary work and establishing a church for and among the unchurched, Bishop Brent was against proselytization. Having observed the extensive work of the Catholic Church in the islands, he decided not to “put up an altar over and against another altar”. He adopted a policy of “non-interference under ordinary circumstances with the adherents of other churches”. Along this line, he decided to concentrate the mission work of the newly established church on the Americans and white Europeans in the country as well as on those geographic areas where there were non-Christians or where the unchurched were not being served by any church.

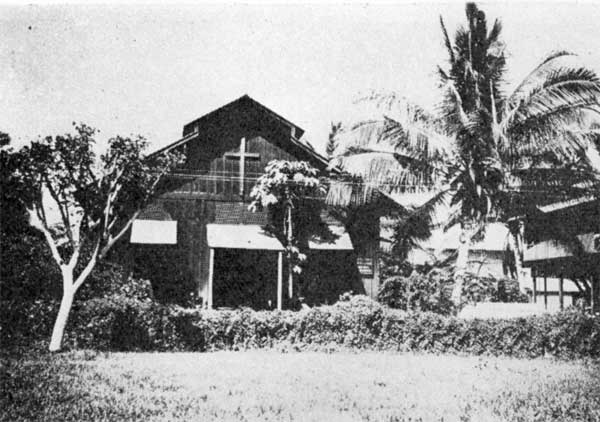
Church of the Holy Trinity in Zamboanga City, 1923

At that time, most non-Christians in the Philippines were migrant Chinese in Manila, indigenous peoples in the North and in the South as well the Muslims in Mindanao. The "pagan natives" of the north and of the south and the Muslims, living in communities in mountain jungles, had fought against the subjugation and rule of the colonial Spanish regime and had not effectively fallen under the rule and governance of Spain. It was to these people and communities that this church went to seek its members through conversions and baptisms.

The church succeeded in its mission and evangelism work among the indigenous people but failed among the Muslims. It converted only five young Muslims girls by uprooting these girls from their communities in Mindanao and bringing them to the Cordillera in the north, where they lived and grew with the missionaries in Christian communities. They were educated, got married, and settled in the Cordillera and did not go back to their Muslim roots in the South.

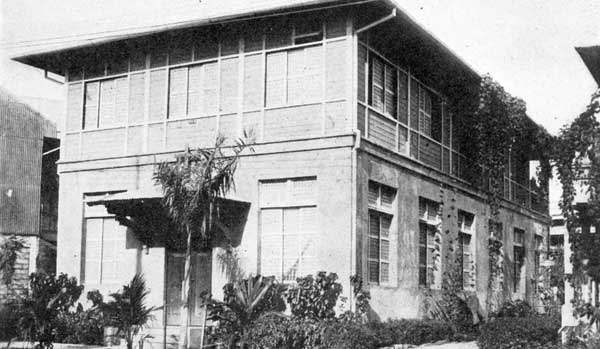
St. Stephen's Church in Manila for Chinese Filipinos in 1923

Bishop Brent's policy of not putting an altar against another altar and the initial and subsequent concentration of missionary work on areas inhabited by non-Christians explains why most of the members of the ECP are predominantly from tribal communities. This also explains why the ECP's work is concentrated in the northern and southern regions of the country. In like manner, it explains why it took almost four decades for this Church to produce its first Filipino clergymen and more than half-a-century to produce its first Filipino bishop, all of whom were from tribal communities. It was this Church that introduced literacy among these people and communities. It was this Church that first established schools, hospitals, clinics and roads in these oft-neglected communities. In time, the government was able to establish public schools, hospitals, and rural health centers for these communities. As a result, this Church phased out some of its schools and clinics in favor of the government providing such basic services needed by these communities.

== Doctrine and practice ==
The Episcopal Church in the Philippines maintains the historic threefold ministry of bishops, priests, and deacons. A local variant of the Book of Common Prayer is used.

== Structure ==
=== Prime Bishop ===
The Episcopal Church in the Philippines is headed by the Prime Bishop of the Philippines, serving as both primate and metropolitan archbishop of the entire church. The post was created in 1969 as a metropolitan role under the primacy of the Presiding Bishop of the American Episcopal Church, and took on the additional role of Primate when the province gained autonomy in 1990.

Contrary to common Anglican practice, but like the Presiding Bishop of the American Episcopal Church and previously the Supreme Bishop of the Philippine Independent Church, the Prime Bishop is not a diocesan bishop.

Name	Church	Position	Birth	Death	Age
Benito C. Cabanban	Philippine Episcopal Church	Presiding Bishop (1967–1978)	1911	1990	78 years
Constancio Buanda Manguramas	Philippine Episcopal Church	Presiding Bishop (1978–1982)	1933	2020	86 years
Richard Abelardo Abellon	Philippine Episcopal Church	Presiding Bishop (1982–1986)	1924	2008	83 years
Richard Abelardo Abellon	Episcopal Church in the Philippines	Prime Bishop (1990–1993)	1924	2008	83 years
Manuel Capuyan Lumpias	Philippine Episcopal Church	Presiding Bishop (1986–1990)	1930	2021	91 years
Narciso Valentin Ticobay	Episcopal Church in the Philippines	Prime Bishop (1993–1997)	1932	2013	81 years
Ignacio Capuyan Soliba	Episcopal Church in the Philippines	Prime Bishop (1997–2009)	1944	2016	72 years
Edward Pacyaya Malecdan	Episcopal Church in the Philippines	Prime Bishop (2009–2014)	1949	2018	69 years
Renato Mag-gay Abibico	Episcopal Church in the Philippines	Prime Bishop (2014–2017)	1951	Alive	73 years+
Joel Atiwag Pachao	Episcopal Church in the Philippines	Prime Bishop (2017–2021)	1956	Alive	67 years+
Brent Harry Wanas Alawas	Episcopal Church in the Philippines	Prime Bishop (2021–2025)	1957	Alive	69+
Nestor Dagas Poltic Sr.	Episcopal Church in the Philippines	Prime Bishop (2025–present)	1967	Alive	58+

=== Dioceses and bishops ===
There are currently seven dioceses within the Episcopal Church in the Philippines.

List of Diocesan Bishops with respective dioceses
Diocese	See	Name	Position	Consecrated	Birth	Death	Age
Central Philippines	Quezon City	Benito C. Cabanban	Diocesan Bishop (1972–1978)	1959.02.02	1911	1990	78 years
Central Philippines	Quezon City	Manuel Capuyan Lumpias	Diocesan Bishop (1978–1996)	1977.09 (as Suffragan Bishop)	1930	2021	91 years
Central Philippines	Quezon City	Benjamin Gayno Botengan	Diocesan Bishop (1996–2003)	1996.05.26	1938	alive	85 years+
Central Philippines	Quezon City	Dixie Copanut Taclobao	Diocesan Bishop (2017–2021)	2003.02.04	1955	Alive	69 years+
Central Philippines	Quezon City	Rex Resurrection Bete Reyes Jr.	Diocesan Bishop (2018–2024)	2018.08.06	1959	Alive	65 years+
Central Philippines	Quezon City	James Ngala Boliget	Diocesan Bishop (2024–present)	2024.07.26	1967	Alive	55 years+
Northern Philippines	Bontoc, Mountain Province	Edward Gaudan Longid	Diocesan Bishop (1972–1975)	1963.02.24	1911	1990	78 years
Northern Philippines	Bontoc, Mountain Province	Richard Abelardo Abellon	Diocesan Bishop (1978–1996)	1975.01	1924	2008	84 years
Northern Philippines	Bontoc, Mountain Province	Robert Lee Omegan Longid	Suffragan Bishop (1983–1986); Diocesan Bishop (1986-1996†)	1983.12.29	1935	1996	60 years
Northern Philippines	Bontoc, Mountain Province	Miguel Paredes Yamoyam	Suffragan Bishop (1994–2013)	1994.10.28	1948	2013	64 years
Northern Philippines	Bontoc, Mountain Province	Edward Pacyaya Malecdan	Diocesan Bishop (1997–2009*)	1997.12.10	1949	2018	69 years
Northern Philippines	Bontoc, Mountain Province	Brent Harry Wanas Alawas	Diocesan Bishop (2009–2021*)	2009.10.28	1957	alive	67 years+
Northern Philippines	Bontoc, Mountain Province	Benny Pil-eyen Lang-akan	Diocesan Bishop (2022–present)	2022.09.14	1968	Alive	56 years+
Southern Philippines	Cotabato City	Constancio Buanda Manguramas	Diocesan Bishop (1972–1982)	1969.01.25	1933	2020	86 years
Southern Philippines	Cotabato City	Richard Abelardo Abellon	Diocesan Bishop (1982–1986)	1975.01	1924	2008	84 years
Southern Philippines	Cotabato City	Narciso Valentin Ticobay	Diocesan Bishop (1986–1993*)	1986.07.27	1932	2013	81 years
Southern Philippines	Cotabato City	James Buanda Manguramas	Diocesan Bishop (1993–2003)	1993.09.14	1938	2021	82 years
Southern Philippines	Cotabato City	Danilo Labacanacruz Bustamante	Diocesan Bishop (2003–2019)	2003.10.28	1953	alive	71 years+
Southern Philippines	Cotabato City	Ernie Martin Moral	Diocesan Bishop (2019–present)	2019.08.05	1972	Alive	52 years+
Northern Luzon	Bulanao, Tabuk, Kalinga	Richard Abelardo Abellon	Diocesan Bishop (1986–1990*)	1975.01	1924	2008	84 years
Northern Luzon	Bulanao, Tabuk, Kalinga	Ignacio Capuyan Soliba	Diocesan Bishop (1991–1997*)	1991.05.26	1944	2016	72 years
Northern Luzon	Bulanao, Tabuk, Kalinga	Renato Mag-gay Abibico	Diocesan Bishop (1997–2014*)	1997.04	1951	alive	73 years+
Northern Luzon	Bulanao, Tabuk, Kalinga	Esteban G. Sabawil	Diocesan Bishop (2015–2017)	2015.10	1956	2017	61 years
Northern Luzon	Bulanao, Tabuk, Kalinga	Hilary Ayban Pasikan Jr.	Diocesan Bishop (2018–present)	2017.09.22	1973	Alive	51 years+
North Central	Baguio	Artemoio Masweng Zabala	Diocesan Bishop (1989–1992)	1989.02	1938	alive	86 years+
North Central	Baguio	Joel Atiwag Pachao	Diocesan Bishop (1993–2017)	1993.03.25	1956	alive	68 years+
North Central	Baguio	Nestor Dagas Poltic Sr.	Diocesan Bishop (2018–2025) (Note: Elected Prime Bishop in May 2024)	2018.05.01	1967	alive	57 years+
Santiago	Santiago City in Isabela	Alexander Arsay Wandag Sr.	Diocesan Bishop (2001–2017)	2001.04.25	1955	alive	69 years+
Santiago	Santiago City in Isabela	Frenzel Ray Pandako Piluden	Diocesan Bishop (2018–present)	2018.04.25	1966	alive	58 years+
Davao	Davao City	Jonathan Labasan Casimina	Diocesan Bishop (2012–2018)	2012.11.29	1966	alive	58 years+

An eighth diocese in the Visayas is also being contemplated, starting with the new congregation in Cebu.

== Gallery ==
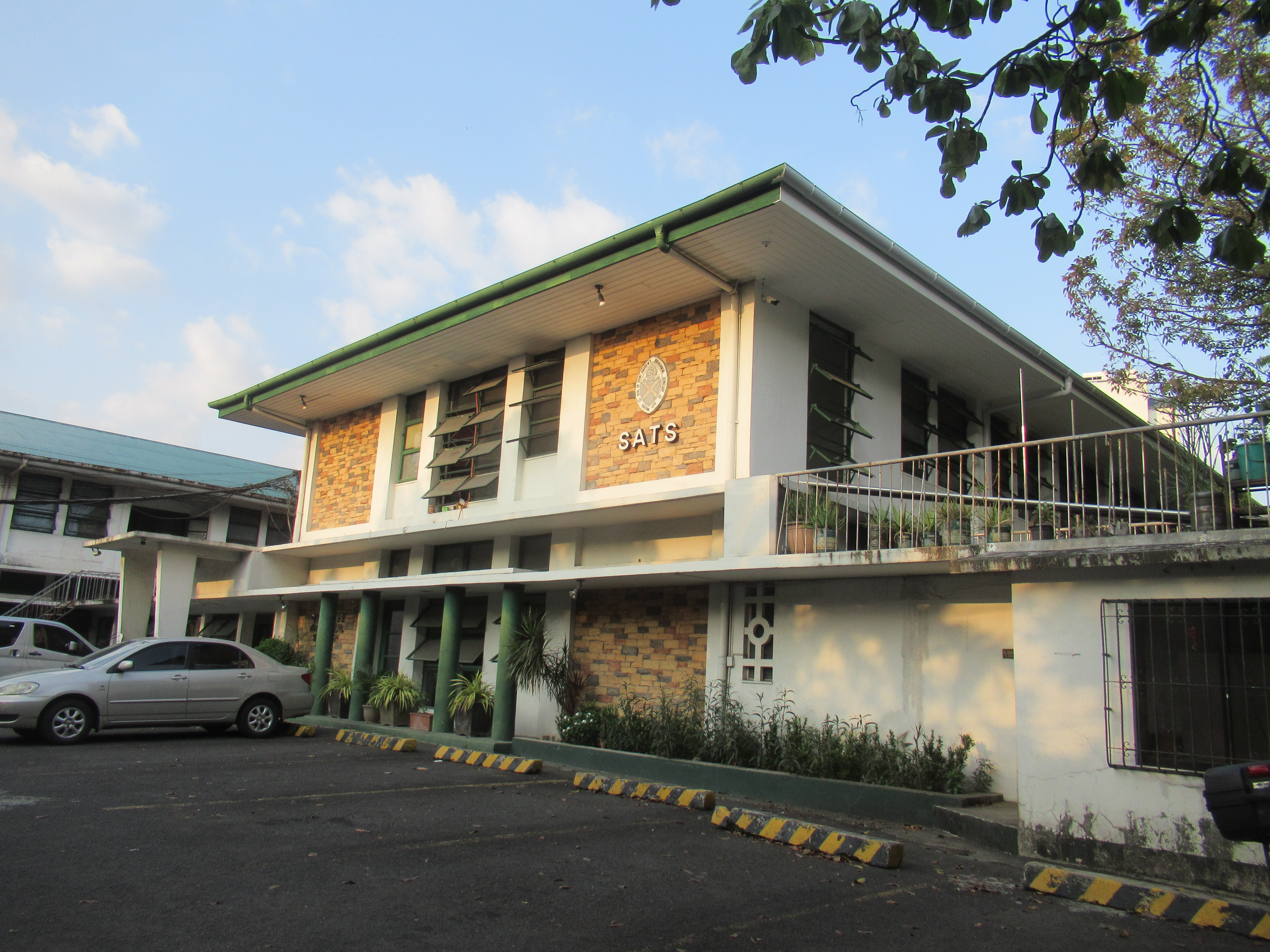
St. Andrew's Theological Seminary

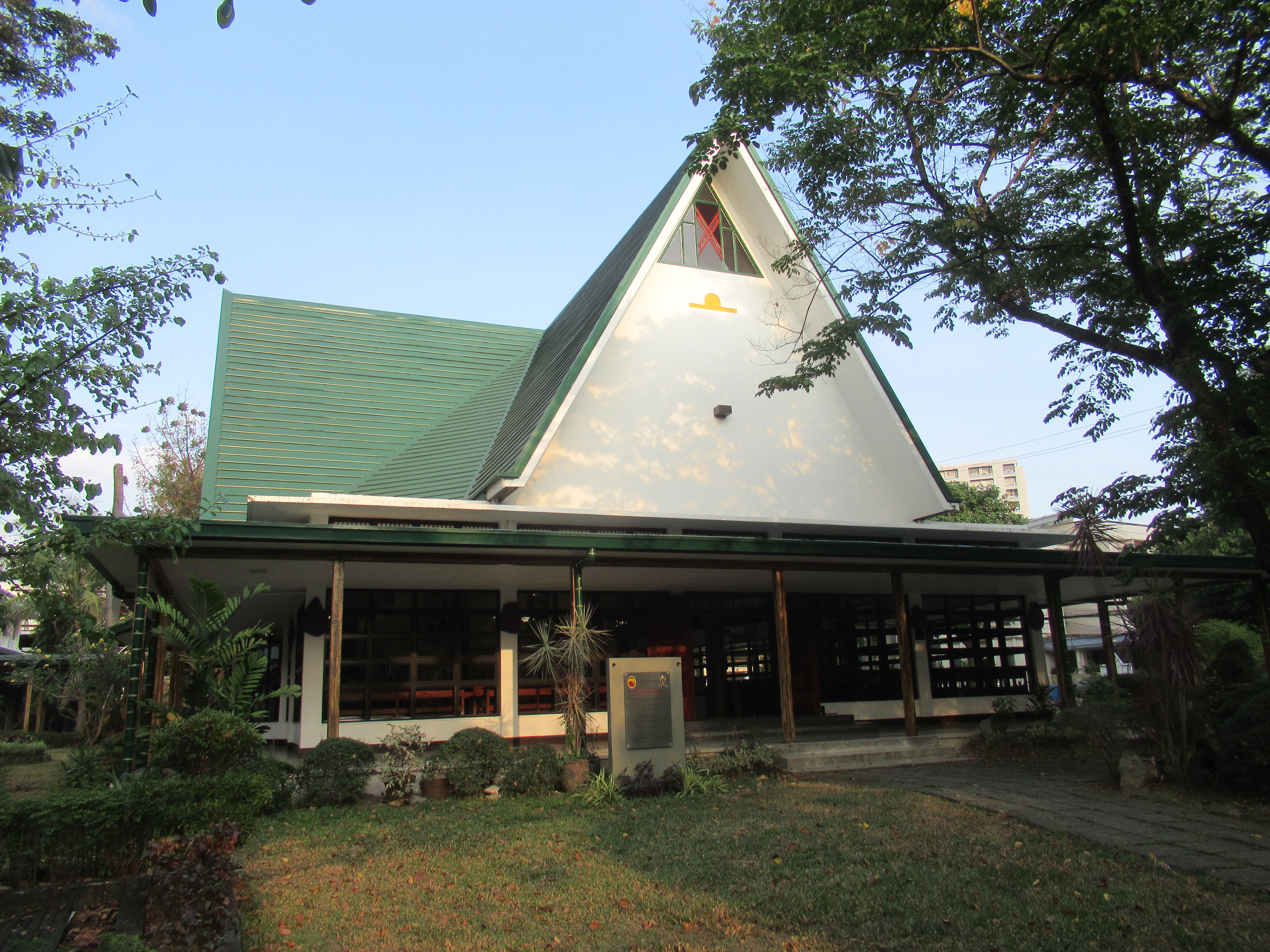
St. Andrew's Theological Seminary Chapel

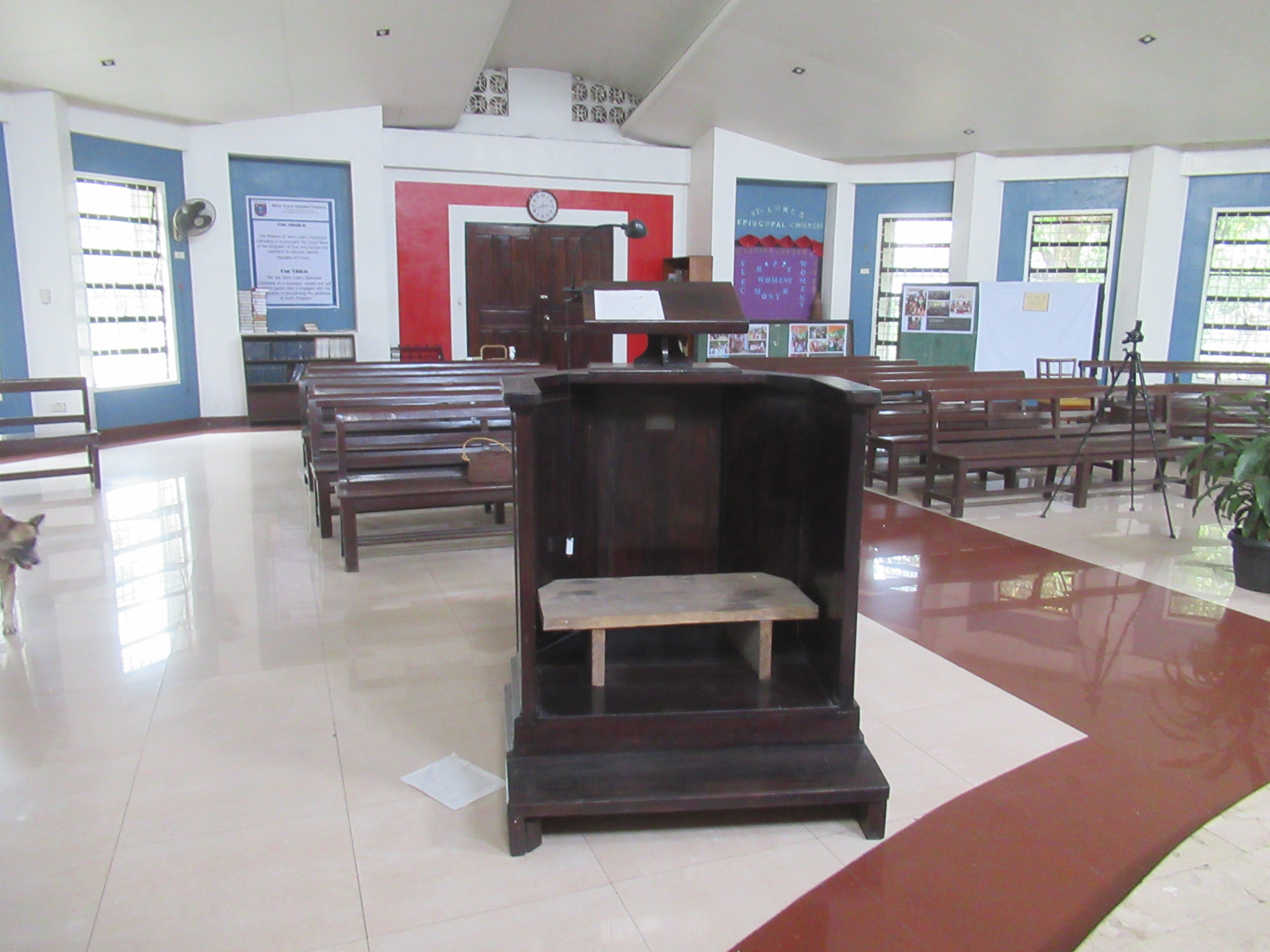
Saint Luke's Episcopal Cathedral (Quezon City)

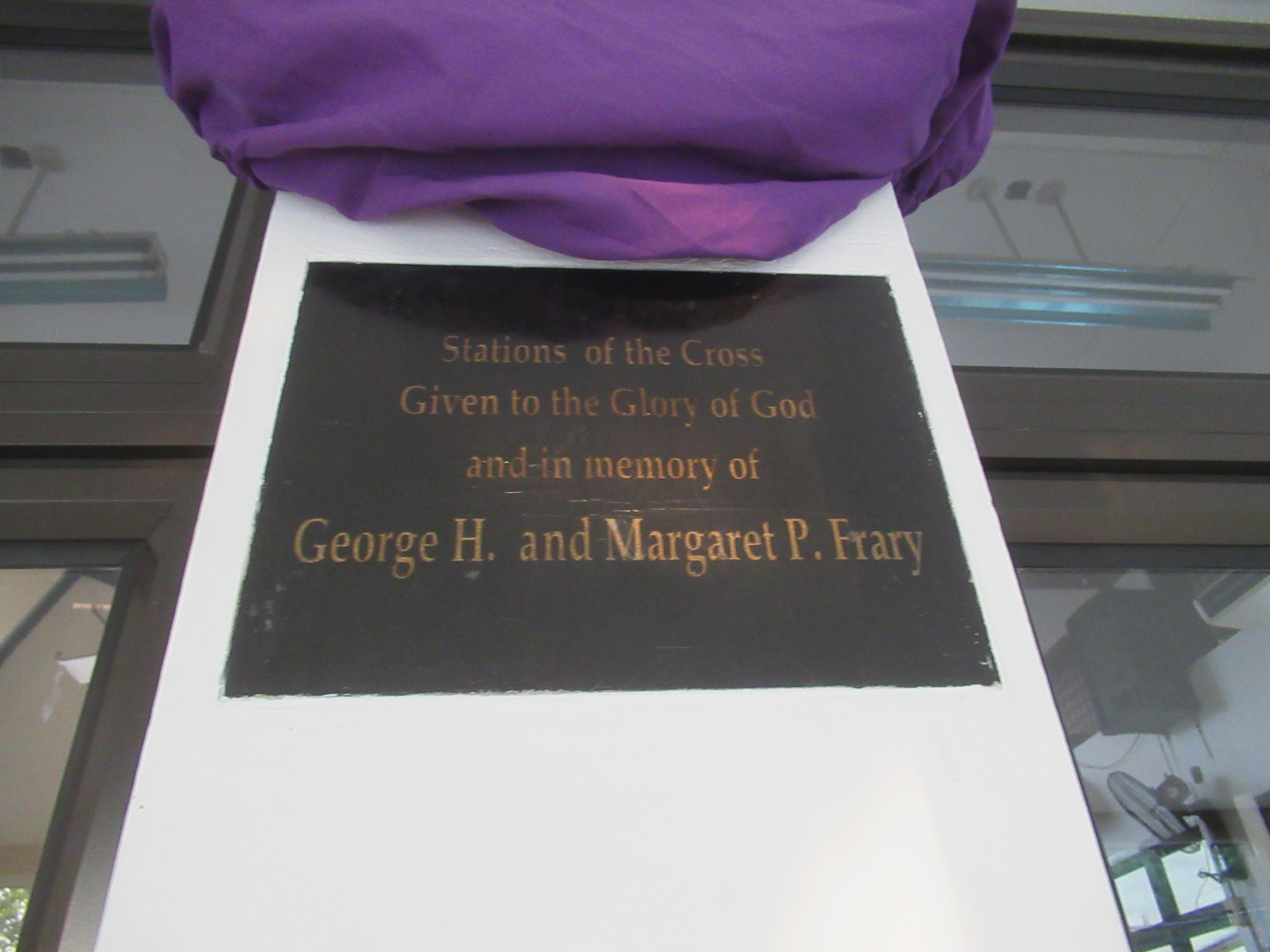
Historical marker of Seminary Chapel

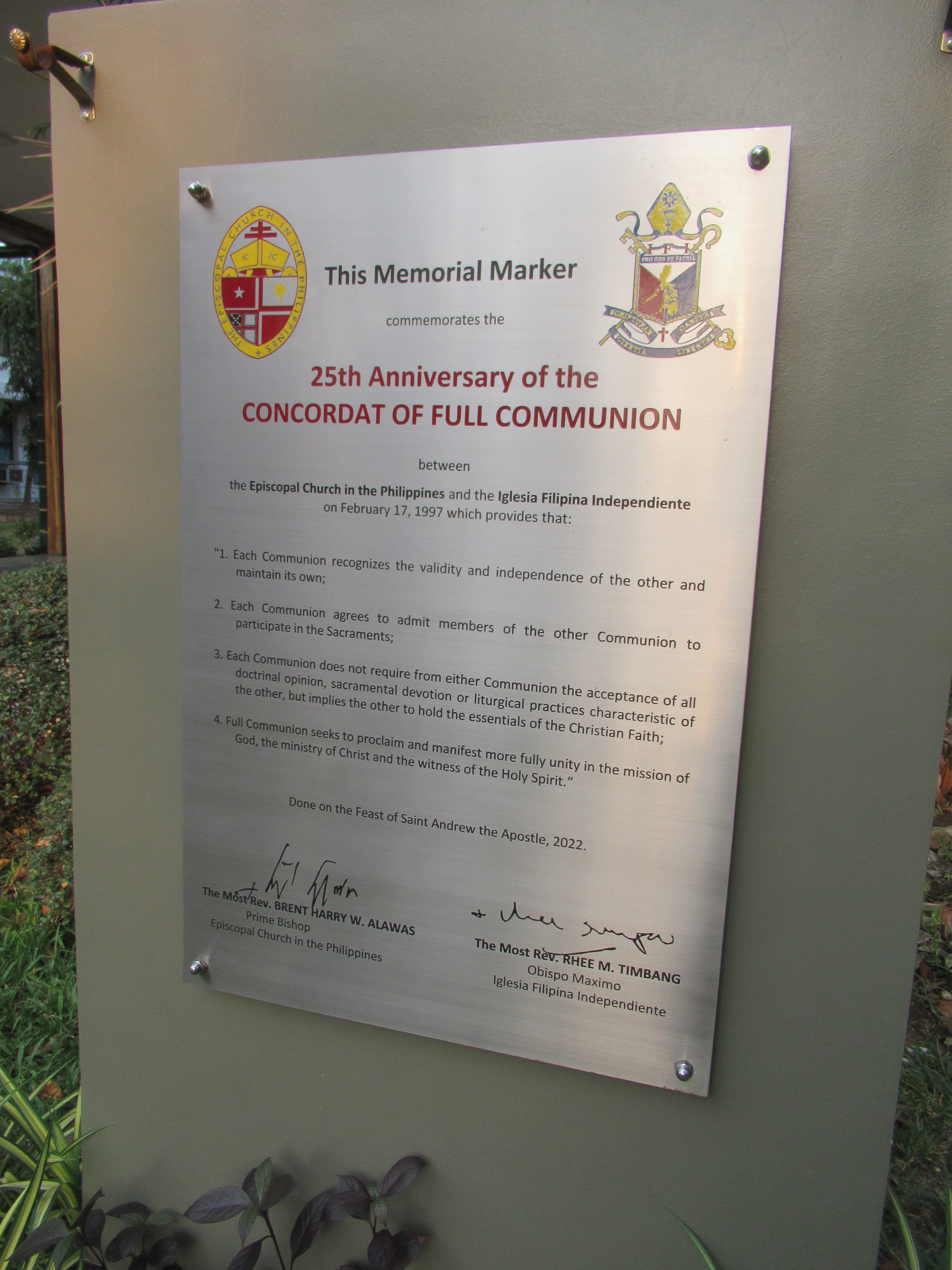
Historical marker of Concordat between the ECP and Iglesia Filipina Independiente

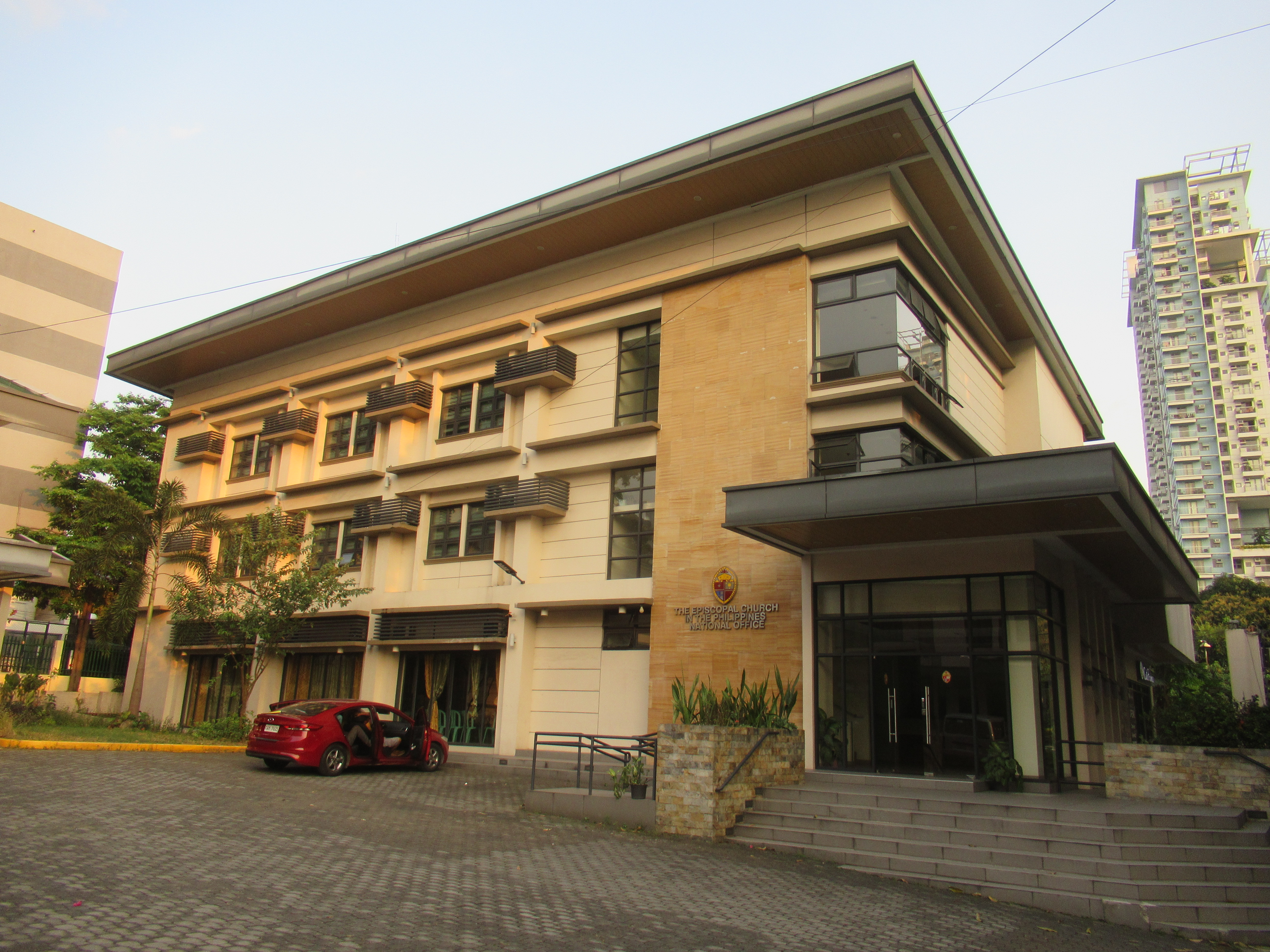
National Office

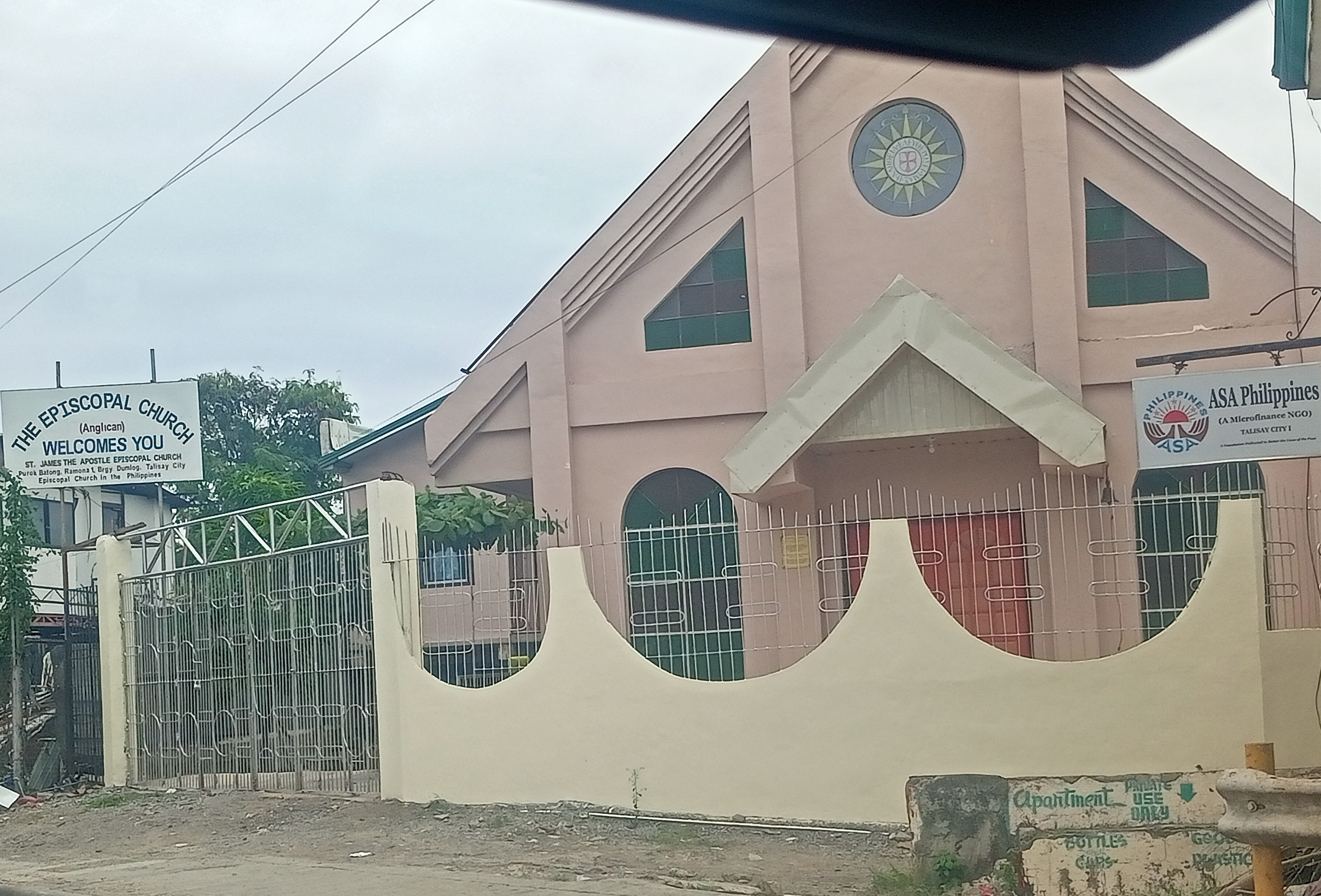
St. James the Apostle Episcopal Church in Talisay City, Cebu

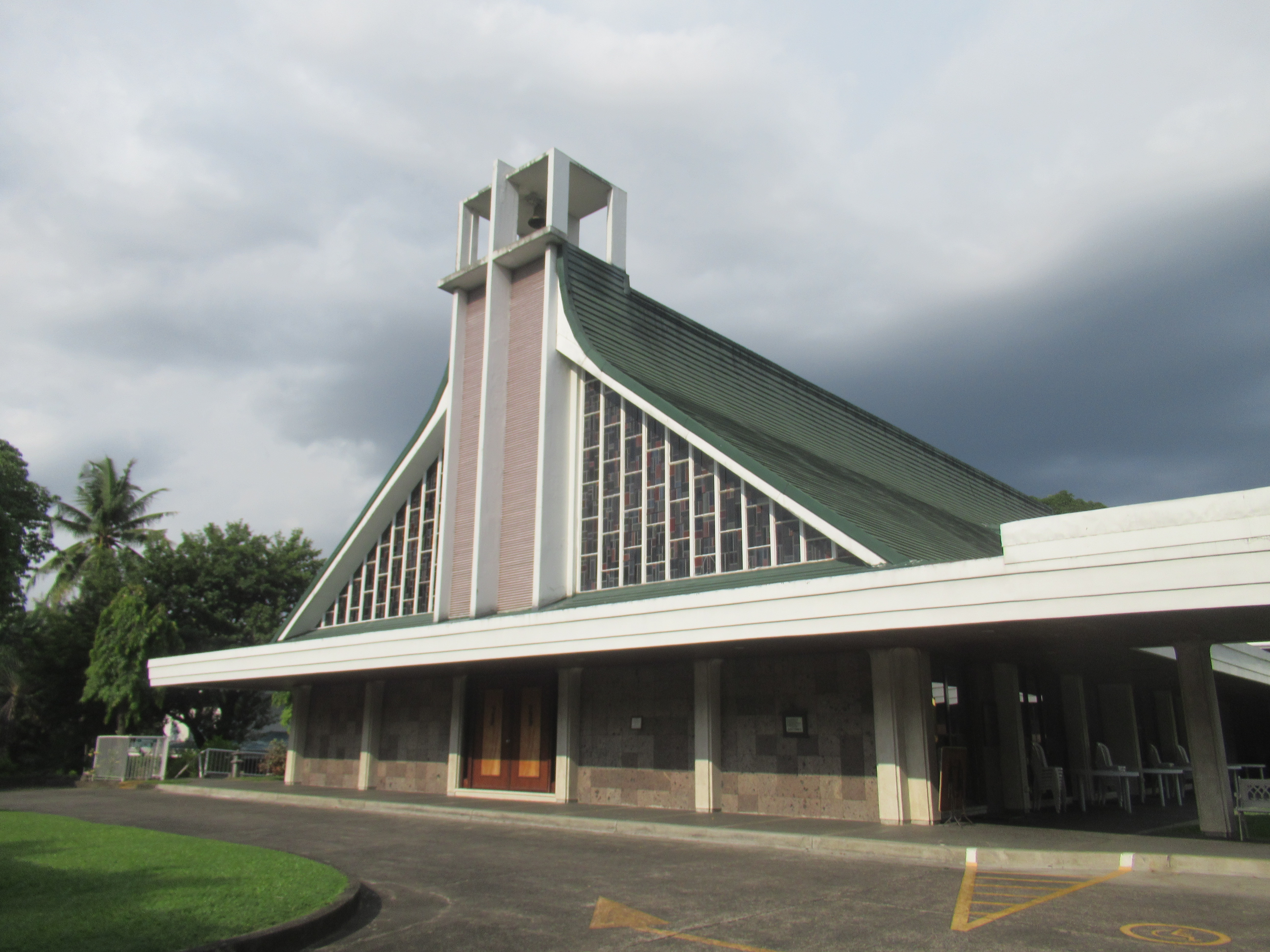
Holy Trinity Church, Forbes Park, Makati
