= Richard Abellon =

Filipino Episcopalian bishop

Richard Abelardo Abellon
- Abellon in 1992
- Died: October 10, 2008
- Occupation: Bishop in the Episcopal Church

Richard Abelardo Abellon (died October 15, 2008) was a Filipino Episcopalian bishop. He was a bishop in The Episcopal Church and the first Prime Bishop of the autonomous Episcopal Church in the Philippines, from 1990 to 1993. He also served as Presiding Bishop of the Philippines under The Episcopal Church in the United States from 1982 to 1986.

Anglican Communion titles
Preceded by Post Established	Prime Bishop of the Episcopal Church in the Philippines; 1990 – 1992	Succeeded by Narciso Ticobay
Preceded by Post Established	Bishop of the Episcopal Diocese of Northern Philippines; 1975– 1986	Succeeded by Robert Longid
Preceded by Post Established	Bishop of the Episcopal Diocese of Northern Luzon; 1986– 1991	Succeeded by Ignacio C. Soliba
Preceded by Constacio Manguramas	Bishop of the Episcopal Diocese of Southern Philippines; 1984– 1986	Succeeded by Narciso Ticobay
